= Hurricane Barbarossa =

- Part of Conflict in the Niger Delta
Date	September 14 – September 27, 2008
Location	Rivers State
Result	Ceasefire declared on September 27, 2008

Belligerents
Nigeria	Movement for the Emancipation of the Niger Delta

Commanders and leaders
Umaru Musa Yar'Adua	Henry Okah

Strength
Unknown	Unknown

Casualties and losses
Unknown	Unknown

Operation Hurricane Barbarossa was a string of militant attacks in Nigeria aimed at bringing down the oil industry in Rivers State. It was launched on September 14, 2008, by the Movement for the Emancipation of the Niger Delta (MEND) but a week later the group declared a ceasefire, after sustaining heavy losses at the hands of the Nigerian armed forces.
