= ODI =

ODI may refer to:

- Object Design, Incorporated, a defunct database software company
- One Day International, a cricket match format
- Open Data Institute, a UK not-for-profit company promoting open data
- Open Data-Link Interface, a software interface
- Oracle Data Integrator, software used in data transformation
- Oral direct inhibitor, a type of anticoagulant
- Oswestry Disability Index, a questionnaire for rating the severity of back pain
- Outcome-Driven Innovation
- Outward direct investment; see Internationalization of the renminbi

Odi may refer to:

- Odi, Bayelsa State, a town in Nigeria
  - Odi massacre, a military attack on the town
- Odi Stadium, a stadium in South Africa

== See also ==
- Odis (disambiguation)
