= Niger Delta Liberation Front =

Militant group in the Niger Delta

- Leader: John Togo †
- Dates active: 2005–2014
- Headquarters: Port Harcourt
- Active regions: Niger Delta
- Ideology: Regionalism
- Size: ~2,500 (2011)
- Wars: Conflict in the Niger Delta

The Niger Delta Liberation Front (NDLF) is a militant group in Nigeria's Niger Delta. The group's former leader John Togo claims that their main goal is to secede from, and gain independence from Nigeria. The group is best known for their notorious leader John Togo who is known throughout Nigeria as a fierce soldier. Although Togo is the NDLF's most notorious member he was killed on July 19, 2011, by a Nigerian air strike near Warri in Delta State. The group is closely linked to the Movement for the Emancipation of the Niger Delta and fight side by side against the Nigerian Army. In early 2013 war erupted within the NDLF after 2 different commanders claimed to be leader. It ended after one was killed in March 2013.

== Background ==
In 1998 the Ijaw Youth Council was formed and many militants were brought up in the Ijaw Youth Council. In 1999 the Odi Massacre occurred in Bayelsa State which was the spark that erupted into violence. In 2004 the Joint Revolutionary Council was formed and recruited members to rock the Nigerian petroleum industry to its core. In 2005 high-ranking member John Togo formed a splinter group after the Joint Revolutionary Council did not deliver much damage. Togo recruited about 4,000 members and went into the Niger Delta to begin attacks.

== John Togo ==
John Togo was one of the most notorious warlords in the Niger Delta region. His most recognizable feature was a scar on his face he received from being shot by a Nigerian soldier. Togo was well known for his skill in bomb making and coordinated attacks against oil installations. In 2009 Togo accepted government amnesty, but returned to fighting a month later after the Nigerian government failed to live up to its promises. By 2010 Togo was the most wanted man in Nigeria. In October 2010 the Nigerian Air Force bombed his camp, but Togo and his men were able to slip into swamps of the Delta. In June 2011 Togo and the NDLF got into a firefight with Nigerian Army. Togo was shot in the arm and his men took him to a hospital in Warri. After bullet was removed from his arm, they fled back into the forest. Less than an hour later Nigerian soldiers raided the hospital, being minutes late to catch him. On July 19, 2011, the Nigerian Air Force bombed Togo's camp with his men in Delta State, whilst they were asleep. Togo and 20 other militants were killed in the attack. The Nigerian Army recovered his body and it was given to his family.

== After Togo ==
With the death of Togo the NDLF seemed weak and many members joined the Movement for the Emancipation of the Niger Delta. Although many members left, around 2,500 remained in the NDLF. For the next 2 years they attacked oil installations on and off. In February 2013 civil war erupted within the group when 2 different commanders claimed to be leaders. After a month of fighting, one was killed and the other took full control of the group.

== Sources ==
- Infos at refworld.org
- Former militants offer to help Niger Delta combat piracy
- How JTF bombed John Togo to death
- Infos on allafrica.com
