= Charles Okah =

Nigerian terrorism convict

Charles Okah is a Nigerian convicted of terrorism currently serving a life jail term for his involvement in the 1 October 2010 Independence Day bombing near Eagle Square, Abuja, and an earlier bombing in Warri, Delta State on 15 March 2010.

== Independence Day, Warri bombing and trial ==
On 15 March 2010 a bomb detonated near Delta State Government House Annex in Warri Delta State killing one and injured twelve others. On Independence Day on 1 October 2010, several bombs planted in three cars detonated simultaneously near Eagle Square, venue of the Independence Day celebration presided by President GoodLuck Jonathan. A total of twelve people were confirmed dead, several others injured and properties including cars nearby were burnt. Following the bombing, Okah and his accomplices, Obi Nwabueze, Edmund Ebiware and Tiemkemfa Francis-Osvwo known as General Gbokos were arrested and arraigned on 7 December 2010 for their role in the Warri and Independence Day bombing in Abuja.

Evidence presented by prosecutors during the trial indicated that Okah's elder brother, Henry Okah—the leader of the Movement for the Emancipation of Niger Delta (MEND)—provided a total N3.2 million naira which was used to purchase six secondhand cars used for the bombing in Warri and Abuja. Francis-Osvwo (General Gbokos) died in detention. Ebiware's trial was conducted separately; he was found guilty as charged and sentenced to life imprisonment on 25 January 2013. Similarly, Henry Okah—who provided the funds—was tried in South Africa on the same charges and on other charges of threatening South African government. He was found guilty of both charges and received a 24-year jail term on the terrorism charges and a 13-year jail term for threatening South African government in 2013.

On 8 March 2018, the Federal High Court sitting in Abuja found Okah and Nwabueze guilty on five of the eight counts of terrorism charges. Both men were sentenced to life imprisonment.

== Maiduguri Maximum Security Prison ==
Following his conviction, Okah was transferred from Kuje Prison, Abuja, where he was held throughout his trial to Maiduguri Maximum Security Prison. At the latter prison, he wrote a book detailing human rights and sexual abuses of women and children being perpetrated in the prison. The book released in January 2019 reported how an 11-year-old boy suffering from a mental condition similar to autism had been held in the prison since he was eight in a cell holding a criminal who sodomised him. The book detailed how prison officials used inmates for cheap labour. The officials carried out forced abortions on female inmates they had allegedly impregnated. An Amnesty International investigation into human and sexual abuses in the prison was found to be consistent with Okah's report.
