= Ebikabowei Victor-Ben =

- Born: 1971 (age 54–55); Niger Delta
- Occupations: MEND commander Politician

Ebikabowei "Boyloaf" Victor-Ben (born 1971) is former commander of the Movement for the Emancipation of the Niger Delta. Boyloaf remains popular in the Niger Delta and is currently a Business Politician.

He also has 8 brothers, the eldest of which is dead. Some of those brothers are Tueride Victor-Ben l, Selekai Victor-Ben, Tari Victor-Ben and the youngest who is seventeen years old, Dembofa Victor-Ben.

Boyloaf at one time was one of the highest-ranked commanders in MEND but left the organization after he was granted amnesty in 2009 by president Umaru Musa Yar'Adua. Since being granted amnesty he has not joined any militant group but still hopes that one day the Niger Delta region will become independent.

== Militancy and activism ==
Boyloaf joined the newly formed Movement for the Emancipation of the Niger Delta in 2006. Boyloaf soon rose to prominence in the ranks of MEND due to his expert commanding skills and was ranked 3rd highest in the ranks of MEND after Dokubo-Asari and Henry Okah. The name Boyloaf became well known throughout the Niger Delta and Boyloaf recruited hundreds of men and turned them into well trained soldiers. By 2008 Boyloaf had influence over many soldiers and people throughout the Niger Delta region. On August 27, 2009 Boyloaf was granted amnesty by the Nigerian president Umaru Musa Yar'Adua in Port Harcourt.

Soon after leaving MEND he became a prominent Nigerian politician and was popular among the people in the Niger Delta region. On October 1, 2010 MEND planted two bombs in the capital Abuja killing 12 people and wounding 17. Boyloaf was arrested but soon released. Boyloaf was arrested again on January 13, 2012 after a car bomb had exploded in a town he had been in the previous day. Again he released soon after. In late 2012 Boyloaf began promoting the Nigerian president Goodluck Jonathan for the 2015 Nigerian election. Due to the spike in MEND's activities in early 2013 Boyloaf was yet again arrested on February 4, 2013 and again released soon after. Even though Boyloaf's days of militancy are far behind him he says that if there is no progress in the Niger Delta and the people of the delta continue to suffer he will return to fighting.

== Personal life ==
He officially wedded his longtime girlfriend Onyi Maris (with whom he has a daughter) in Houston Texas on Wednesday, May 3, 2017. In November 19th, 2022 Boyloaf re-married to Faridia Olivia, the widow of ex-governor (Audu Abubakar) of Kogi State, Nigeria.

== Criticisms ==
Following a review of government data published by Govspend, a platform which tracks Nigerian government spending, it was revealed that the Office of the Special Adviser to the President on Niger-Delta paid Boyloaf about N564.7 million between July and November 2023 in 18 different transactions.
