= Federal Fire Service =

- FFS

Agency overview
- Formed: 1901 (as Lagos Fire Brigade); 1963 (Statutory establishment)
- Jurisdiction: Civil Defence, Correctional, Fire and Immigration Services Board (CDCFIB)
- Headquarters: Mohammadu Buhari Way, Area 10, Garki, Abuja, Nigeria
- Minister responsible: Olubunmi Tunji-Ojo
- Agency executive: Olumode Samuel Adeyemi, Controller-General; Deputy Controller-General (DCG); Assistant Controller-General (ACG)
- Parent agency: Ministry of Interior
- Website: fedfire.gov.ng

The Federal Fire Service (FFS) is the principal government agency responsible for firefighting, rescue operations, and fire prevention policy across the Federal Republic of Nigeria. Operating under the supervision of the Ministry of Interior, the FFS regulates national fire safety codes, maintains emergency assets, and provides training programs through its dedicated academies. Outside of its headquarters in Abuja, the agency is divided into regional geopolitical zones.

== History ==
The establishment of organized firefighting in Nigeria traces back to the British colonial era. The first formal framework was initiated in 1901 with the creation of the Lagos Fire Brigade in the Southern Nigeria Protectorate, designed initially to safeguard administrative infrastructure and colonial installations in Lagos Island.

Following independence in 1960, the Parliament of Nigeria passed the Fire Service Act of 1963. This statute formally converted the old colonial municipal brigade into a nationwide agency named the Federal Fire Service. The Act empowered the body to operate across regional boundaries, draft policy, and assist localized regions experiencing large-scale fire emergencies.

== Structure ==
- Administration and Supply Department
- Finance and Accounts Department
- Operations Department
- Planning Research and Statistics/ICT Department
- National Fire Academy
- Investigation, Inspectorate and Enforcement Department (IIE)

=== Agencies ===
- National Fire Data Repository Center (NFDRC)

=== Zones ===
Each zone manages multiple state field commands containing localized urban stations, ensuring operational assets remain within striking distance of severe incidents:

- Zone A: Benue, Nasarawa
- Zone B: Plateau, Kaduna
- Zone C: Bauchi, Gombe
- Zone D: Enugu, Anambra
- Zone E: Akwa Ibom, Rivers
- Zone F: Lagos, Ogun
- Zone G: Niger, FCT
- Zone H: Sokoto, Kebbi
- Zone I: Adamawa, Taraba
- Zone J: Imo, Abia
- Zone K: Delta, Bayelsa, Edo
- Zone L: Osun, Oyo
- Zone M: Kano, Jigawa
- Zone N: Borno, Yobe
- Zone O: Kwara, Kogi
- Zone P: Katsina, Zamfara
- Zone Q: Cross River, Ebonyi
- Zone R: Ekiti, Ondo

== List of Controllers-General ==
Name	Tenure Started	Tenure Ended	President
Ayo Emmanuel Olumuyiwa		9 December 2014	Goodluck Jonathan
Joseph Anebi Garba	9 December 2014	1 March 2019	Goodluck Jonathan Muhammadu Buhari
Ibrahim Alhaji Liman	1 March 2019	26 April 2022	Goodluck Jonathan Muhammadu Buhari
Abdulganiyu Jaji Olola	26 April 2022	August 14, 2025	Muhammadu Buhari Bola Tinubu
Olumode Samuel Adeyemi	August 14, 2025	Present	Bola Tinubu

== See also ==
- List of fire departments
