= Turner Timinipre Isoun =

Nigerian academic and administrator

Turner Timinipre Isoun FNAS, FAAS
- Portrait of Turner Isoun

Minister of Science and Technology
- In office 2000–2007
- President: Olusegun Obasanjo

Vice-Chancellor of the Rivers State University of Science and Technology
- In office 1 September 1980 – 30 April 1984
- Preceded by: Office established
- Succeeded by: A. O. A. Soyannwo

Personal details
- Born: Turner Timinipre Isoun; 2 September 1938 Odi, Bayelsa State, Nigeria
- Died: 15 July 2026 (aged 87) Abuja, Nigeria
- Education: Odi Primary School; Okrika Grammar School; Michigan State University (B.Sc., D.V.M., Ph.D.)

Turner Timinipre Isoun (2 September 1938 –15 July 2026) was a Nigerian academic and administrator who served as Minister of Science and Technology from 2000 to 2007 under President Olusegun Obasanjo. He was the vice-chancellor of the Rivers State University of Science and Technology and a professor of veterinary pathology at the University of Ibadan.

== Biography ==
=== Early life and education ===
Isoun was born on 2 September 1938 in Odi, Bayelsa State, Nigeria. He attended Odi Primary School and Okrika Grammar School before enrolling at a higher school established by the Presbyterian Church.

He received a Federal Government scholarship to study in the United States and enrolled at Michigan State University, where he earned a Bachelor of Science degree, a Doctor of Veterinary Medicine and a Doctor of Philosophy in veterinary pathology.

=== Career ===
Following his return to Nigeria, Isoun joined the University of Nigeria, Nsukka, as a lecturer in veterinary pathology before transferring to the University of Ibadan, where he became a professor of veterinary pathology.

On 1 September 1980, Isoun was appointed the vice-chancellor of the Rivers State University of Science and Technology where served until 30 April 1984.

President Olusegun Obasanjo appointed Isoun Minister of Science and Technology in 2000, and he served until 2007. During his tenure, the Federal Government established the National Information Technology Development Agency (NITDA) to coordinate the development of information technology in Nigeria and created Galaxy Backbone to provide shared information and communications technology infrastructure for government institutions.

His tenure also saw the launch of NigeriaSat-1, the country's first Earth observation satellite, in 2003 and NigComSat-1, its first communications satellite, in 2007 through the National Space Research and Development Agency.

== Personal life ==
While studying at Michigan State University, Isoun met his future wife, an American academic. They later married and collaborated on publications, including a book in 2013.

Isoun died in Abuja on 15 July 2026, at the age of 87.

== Honours and recognition ==
Isoun was a Fellow of the Nigerian Academy of Science and the African Academy of Sciences.
