= Separatist movements of Nigeria =

Separatist movements of Nigeria want to achieve state secession, which is the withdrawal of one or more of the states of Nigeria from the multinational state of the Federal Republic of Nigeria. The only act of secession in Nigeria occurred from 1967 to 1970 during the Nigerian Civil War, when the breakaway republic of Biafra declared its independence from Nigeria and was eventually defeated. Ever since then, Nigeria has experienced the emergence of separatist movements seeking the independence of Biafra as well as other proposed states.

== History ==
=== Colonial era ===
==== 1914 ====
Separatist sentiments first occurred in 1914, when Frederick Lugard unified the Northern Nigeria Protectorate (predominantly Muslim) and the Southern Nigeria Protectorate (predominantly pagan/animist and Christian) into the single colony of Nigeria. Ahmadu Bello in his autobiography noted the unpopularity in Northern Nigeria of the merger, likely referring to the native Islamic rulers of Northern Nigeria.

==== 1950s ====
As Nigeria was transitioning towards self-rule during the 1950s, new constitutional arrangements and rivalries between political parties intensified secessionist rhetoric. A particular point of contention centered around Lagos, which was the capital of Nigeria at the time. Delegates from the predominantly Igbo Eastern Region regarded Lagos as a "no man's land", while delegates from the predominantly Yoruba Western Region regarded Lagos to be a culturally Yoruba city to be governed strictly on their terms. Obafemi Awolowo, the premier of Western Region, sent a letter which stated the freedom of Western Region to "decide whether or not they will remain on the proposed Nigerian Federation", implicitly threatening secession.

=== Post-independence ===
Secessionist sentiments re-emerged during the federal election of December 1964 and the Western Region election of 1965. President Nnamdi Azikiwe stated:

It is better for us and for our admirers abroad that we should disintegrate in peace and not in pieces. Should the politicians fail to heed this warning, then I will venture the prediction that the experience of the Democratic Republic of the Congo will be child's play if it ever comes to our turn to play such a tragic role

However, in response, Ahmadu Bello reiterated the 1963 constitution of Nigeria had no provision for secession.

== Separatist movements ==
Separatist movements include:

- The Indigenous People of Biafra (IPOB) and its arm wing the Eastern Security Network who support the independence of Biafra. They are allied with the Anglophone Cameroonian independence movement.
- The Oduduwa Republic, a Yoruba secessionist movement. In 2024, Yoruba separatists attempted to overthrow the government in Oyo State.
- The Arewa Republic, in the North of the country
- The Niger Delta Republic, supported by the Niger Delta Liberation Front and the Movement for the Emancipation of the Niger Delta, leading to the 2016 Niger Delta conflict.

== Sources ==
- Tamuno, Tekena N. (1970). "Separatist Agitations in Nigeria since 1914". The Journal of Modern African Studies. 8 (4): 563–584. ISSN 0022-278X.
