= NDV =

NDV may refer to:

- Newcastle disease virus, the virus that causes Newcastle disease
- Niger Delta Vigilante, an armed militia group in the Niger Delta
- Number of Distinct Values, a metric useful in determining density estimation, especially when working with histograms or when selecting the optimal indexing strategy in a relational database
- Nick D'Virgilio, progressive rock drummer
- Nyck de Vries, Dutch racing driver, Formula E champion
