= October 2010 Abuja bombings =

Terrorist incident in Nigeria

- Part of the conflict in the Niger Delta
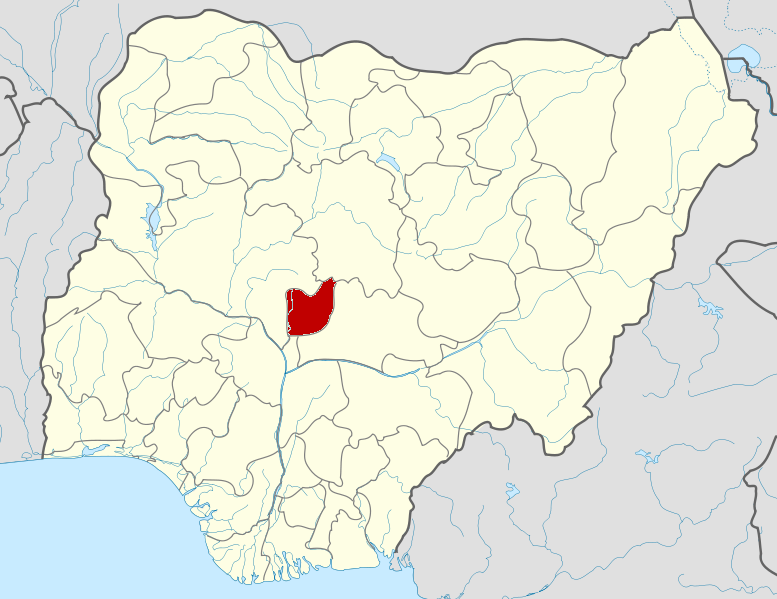
- Location: Abuja, Nigeria
- Date: 1 October 2010 (GMT+1)
- Target: Crowds celebrating the 50th anniversary of Nigeria's independence
- Attack type: Car bombing
- Weapon: Car bombs
- Deaths: 12
- Injuries: 17
- Perpetrator: Movement for the Emancipation of the Niger Delta

Two car bombings were carried out against crowds celebrating the fiftieth anniversary (golden jubilee) of Nigeria's independence in the capital city Abuja on the morning of 1 October 2010. The attacks left 12 dead and 17 injured. According to multiple sources, the Movement for the Emancipation of the Niger Delta (MEND) issued a warning less than an hour before the first bomb stating the location, near Eagle Square (the venue of the celebration), and the time, around 10:30 a.m., of planned bombings.

The first blast occurred around 10:30 a.m., emergency services arrived at the scene and then the second blast occurred.

== Reactions and investigation ==
A former leader of MEND, Henry Okah, was arrested in South Africa following the twin car bombings. Okah denied accusations of planning the bombings and was disowned by MEND. Police in Nigeria also detained Raymond Dokpesi, campaign manager for former President Ibrahim Babangida, for questioning over the bombing. Dokpesi was later released and said his arrest was political in nature.

Nigerian newspaper This Day reported that British intelligence was warned of a plot against the 50th anniversary celebrations, and this was the reason that former Prime Minister Gordon Brown and Prince Richard, Duke of Gloucester cancelled their trips to Nigeria for the celebration.
