= Oyo State coup attempt =

2024 coup d'état attempt in Nigeria

- Part of separatism in Nigeria
Date	13 April 2024
Location	Ibadan, Nigeria
Result	Coup attempt failed

Belligerents
Yoruba Nation separatists ("Democratic Republic of the Yoruba")	Nigeria; Oyo State

Commanders and leaders
Modupe Onitiri-Abiola	Unknown

Units involved
Ominira Yoruba Group; Amotekun Corps elements	Nigerian Army; Nigeria Police Force

Casualties and losses
21 arrested	Unknown

On 13 April 2024, a group of armed Yoruba separatists attempted to capture government buildings in Ibadan, the capital of Nigeria's Oyo State. Acting on the orders of a leading separatist, Modupe Onitiri-Abiola, the militants intended to overthrow the local government and enforce the independence declaration of the so-called "Democratic Republic of the Yoruba". Though they managed to storm the local State Secretariat, the separatists were quickly engaged by Nigerian security forces and defeated after a short shootout.

== Background ==
As a multi-ethnic state, Nigeria has been affected by many separatist movements since its independence. The Yoruba people are one of the country's largest ethnic groups and have a major presence in many southern states of Nigeria. Over time, radical Yoruba factions began demanding the formation of a new, independent country named "Oduduwa Republic", "Yoruba Nation" or "Democratic Republic of the Yoruba". In the 2020s, their demands gained prominence and popularity due to the herder–farmer conflicts in Nigeria, as many Yoruba feel threatened by Fulani herdsmen and formed a self-defense group called "Amotekun Corps". Fulani herders launched attacks on Yoruba farmers in the wider region with increasing frequency. Furthermore, Biafran separatist unrest erupted into a low-level insurgency in southeastern Nigeria from 2021. This development inspired some Yoruba nationalists, and one group even allied with Biafran militants and formed the "Oduduwa Volunteer Force for the Liberation of Southern Nigeria" to fight against Fulani herders in 2021. One separatist activist, Sunday Igboho, rallied a group to evict Fulani herders from villages around Oyo State, and threatened to disrupt the 2023 Nigerian general election. His actions met considerable local sympathy, but also provoked a response by the Nigeria Police Force. When the police tried to arrest Igboho, he fled to Benin. He was detained there, but later released.

In 2021, another Yoruba separatist faction formed around Modupe Onitiri-Abiola, one of several widows of deceased Nigerian business magnate and politician Moshood Abiola. The latter was well known for having won the 1993 Nigerian presidential election, only for the results to be annulled by military ruler Ibrahim Babangida. Having spent several years living in exile after her husband's death and the murder of one of his other wives, Kudirat Abiola, Onitiri-Abiola returned to Nigeria in 2014. Soon after, she declared her intention to run for Lagos State governorship. Running for the Accord party, she was heavily defeated in the 2015 elections. For years, she disappeared from politics, but became a major activist for Yoruba separatism in 2021. At the time, Onitiri-Abiola pointed to the herder–farmer conflicts, claiming that the Nigerian state failed to protect the interests of the Yoruba people in disputes with Fulani herders. She established the "Ominira Yoruba Group", an interest group which gathered signatures for a petition that demanded self-determination for the Yoruba people. Security forces reacted violently to the growing activities of separatists, conducting a "brutal crackdown" on Yoruba activists in Lagos in July 2021.

We are declaring this day that we are no longer part of this country. With the awesome power that God used to create the sky and seven clouds, moon, and stars, I, Modupe Onitiri-Abiola, proclaim the Democratic Republic of Yoruba.

— Modupe Onitiri-Abiola's declaration of independence on 12 April 2024

On 29 May 2023, some of Onitiri-Abiola's suspected followers hijacked a radio station in Ibadan and blocked major highways before being driven off by security forces. On the same day, another separatist group (dubbed "Yoruba Nation Army") stormed the Alausa Police Division in Lagos, proclaiming the "Yoruba Nation has taken over" until policemen opened fire to chase them away. Onitiri-Abiola became quite active on social media and YouTube, inciting violence, spreading conspiracy theories, and accusing non-separatist Yoruba leaders of being corrupt. On 12 April 2024, Onitiri-Abiola published a video of herself on YouTube, proclaiming the independence of the "Democratic Republic of the Yoruba". At the time, she was believed to be staying in the United States. Observers likened her proclamation to those of Biafran exile separatists such as Simon Ekpa.

== Coup attempt ==
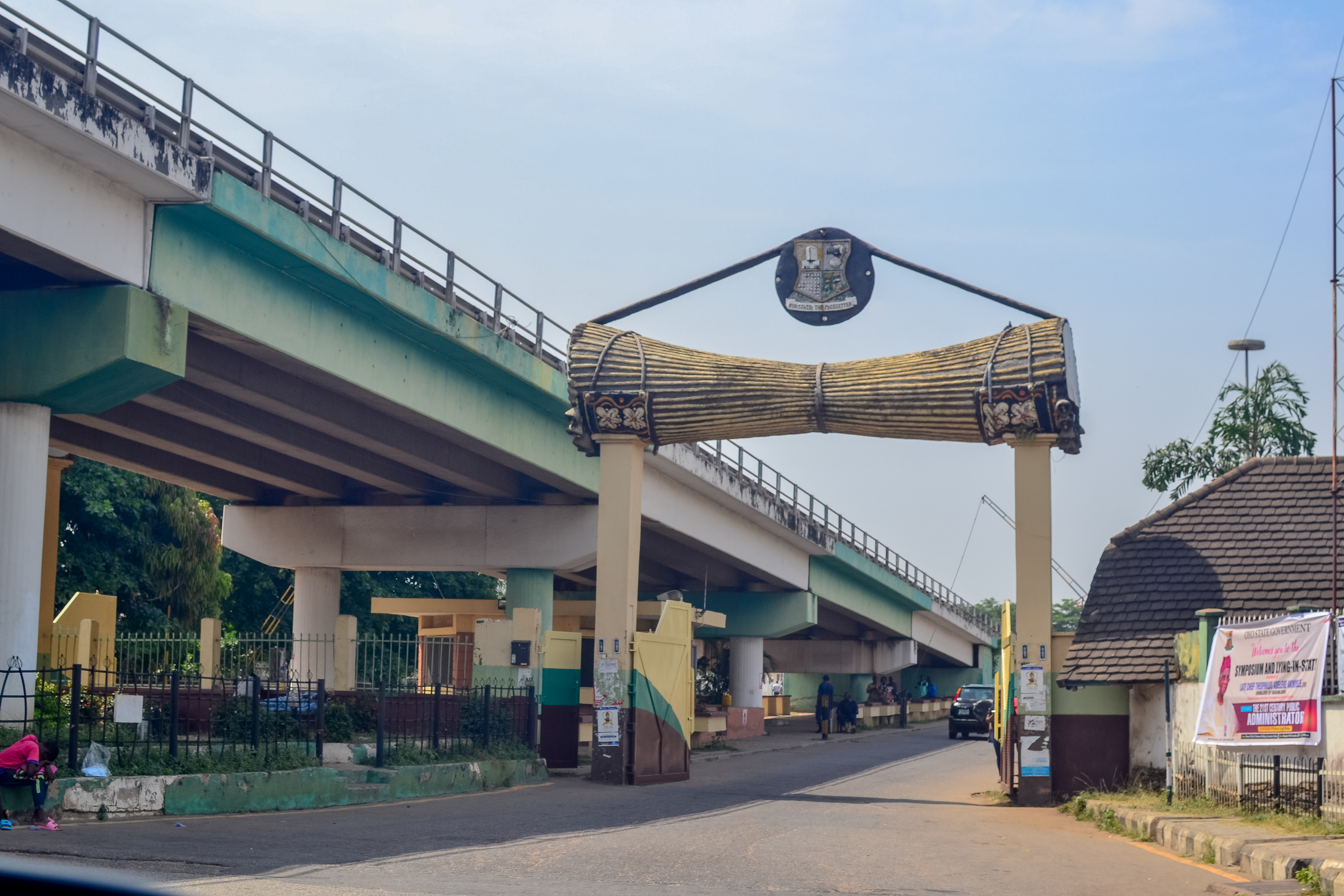
Entrance to the State Sectariat in Ibadan in 2010

On 13 April 2024, a group of armed individuals in military camouflages entered Ibadan on motorcycles. At about 9:35 am local time, the group attempted to forcibly enter Oyo State House of Assembly and the State Secretariat. Declaring themselves "Yoruba Nation soldiers", they tried to seize the buildings and fanned out around the area. At the State Secretariat, they removed the flag of Nigeria, raised the "Oodua nation flag", proclaimed the Democratic Republic of the Yoruba's independence, and tried to overpower the local guards.

However, policemen and Nigerian Army soldiers quickly responded, rushing to the scene and opening fire on the militants. After a shootout, the security forces defeated the Yoruba separatists and captured nine of them. The remaining mililtants fled the scene. The security forces subsequently conducted manhunts; overall 21 individuals were arrested. The prisoners were interrogated; the captured militants declared that they had been under the command and paid by Onitiri-Abiola. One suspect declared that she had been promised an end of hunger for her family in return for assisting in the coup attempt; others were purely politically motivated. Security forces stated that the militants were members of the Ominira Yoruba Group and Amotekun Corps.

== Aftermath ==
Nigerian security forces described the event as "criminal, unpatriotic and a clear case of treasonable felony and terrorism". Oyo State Governor Seyi Makinde praised the soldiers and policemen for their quick response. Across southwestern Nigeria, security forces reinforced government buildings in response to the attack. Ogun State Commissioner of Police Abiodun Alamutu warned Yoruba separatists against threatening "the reign of peace" as Nigerian law enforcement agencies were ready to respond. Furthermore, government forces destroyed two buildings owned by Onitiri-Abiola in Ibadan, stating that these had been used to store weapons by the Yoruba militants. After her role in the coup attempt became publicly known, Onitiri-Abiola was denounced by the rest of the Abiola family. One of Moshood Abiola's sons, Jamiu Abiola, declared that "after [Moshood Abiola's] death many years ago, you cannot expect every member of his family to act in a way that represents what he stood for". By May 2024, Onitiri-Abiola's location remained unknown.

Several civil groups condemned the coup attempt, including various Yoruba factions. The Yoruba Council of Elders described the event as "coup", condemned it, and demanded that the "parties involved in the dastardly act" should be punished as criminal coupists. Afenifere, an important Yoruba socio-cultural organization, also condemned the event. Two prominent Yoruba nationalists, Sunday Adeyemo and Banji Akintoye, denied any role in the coup attempt. Akintoye even alleged a conspiracy, accusing Onitiri-Abiola of "working for the Fulanis or other entities against our simple objective of leaving Nigeria peacefully".

=== Subsequent activities and announcements ===
In November 2024, the trial of 27 suspects arrested in connection with the coup attempt commenced at the Oyo State High Court in Ibadan. The suspects faced charges including conspiracy, unlawful possession of firearms, unlawful assembly, treasonable felony, and treason.

On 25 December 2025, the Ogun State Police Command arrested eight suspected members of the Democratic Republic of the Yoruba in Sango-Ota. According to police spokesperson Oluseyi Babaseyi, the group had unlawfully barricaded major roads, set bonfires, and disrupted traffic while displaying flags and banners associated with the Democratic Republic of the Yoruba. The arrested individuals were charged with breach of public peace, unlawful assembly, obstruction of traffic, and assault on police officers.

In July 2026, the Democratic Republic of the Yoruba announced plans for a public gathering called the "One Million Freedom March." According to the organization's leadership, the event is intended to bring together supporters to express views on Yoruba identity, cultural preservation, and self-determination. The organization stated that Mobolaji Olawale Akinola Omokore serves as Provisional President and Head of the Provisional Government, following his inauguration on 12 April 2024. Organizers described the planned march as peaceful, with participants expected from across Yorubaland and the global Yoruba diaspora.

== See also ==
- Insurgency in Southeastern Nigeria
