= Federal Ministry of Interior (Nigeria) =

Federal ministry in Nigeria

Ministry of Interior

Agency overview
- Formed: 1957; 69 years ago
- Type: Executive Department
- Jurisdiction: Federal Government of Nigeria
- Headquarters: Abuja
- Minister responsible: Olubunmi Tunji-Ojo
- Parent department: Government of Nigeria
- Child agencies: Nigerian Correctional Service; Nigeria Immigration Service; Federal Fire Service; Nigeria Security and Civil Defence Corps
- Key document: Section 217-220 of the 1999 Constitution of Nigeria
- Website: interior.gov.ng

The Federal Ministry of the Interior is a Ministry of the Federal Government of Nigeria tasked with providing complementary internal security and other ancillary services within Nigeria. The Ministry is headed by the Minister of Interior, a cabinet-level head who reports directly to the President of the Federal Republic of Nigeria. The current minister of interior is Olubunmi Tunji-Ojo.

== History ==
The concern to maintain internal security gave rise to the creation of the federal ministry of internal affairs in 1957. The Federal Republic of Nigeria Official Gazette of 6 December 1983 assigned the statutory roles to the ministry. In 2015, the Ministry of Internal Affairs merged with the Ministry of Police Affairs, resulting in the Ministry of the Interior.

== Organization ==
=== Civil Defence, Immigration, Prisons, Fire Service Board (CDFIPB) ===
The Civil Defence, Immigration, Prisons, Fire Service Board (CDFIPB) is in charge of oversight for the agencies under the interior ministry.

=== Agencies ===
Several federal law enforcement agencies are administered by the Department of Justice:

- Nigerian Correctional Service
- Nigeria Immigration Service
- Federal Fire Service
- Nigeria Security and Civil Defence Corps

== Functions ==
The Ministry formulates and implements policies related to border management and supervises the National Immigration Service. Its other functions include:

- Granting of Nigerian citizenship
- Consular and immigration services
- Granting of business permits and expatriate quotas
- Co-ordination of national and independence day celebrations
- Reformation and re-integration of inmates
- Security of lives and properties
- Management of National emergencies;
- Recruitment of officers and men of the Correctional Service, Immigration Service, Fire Service and the Nigeria Security and Civil Defence Corps
- Managing the retirement benefits of retirees of paramilitary Services under its supervision.

== List of ministers ==
Name	Term	Note
Joseph Modupe Johnson	1957–1959	
Usman Sarki	1959–1962	
Shehu Shagari	1962–1965	
Shettima Ali Monguno	1965–1966	Federal Minister of Internal Affairs
Kam Selem	1967–1975	Federal Commissioner for Internal Affairs
Adamu Suleiman	1975	Federal Commissioner for Internal Affairs
Umaru Shinkafi	1975–1979	Federal Commissioner for Internal Affairs
Bello Maitama Yusuf*	1979–1983	
Bagudu Mamman*	1990–1991	
Tunji Olagunju*	1992–1993	
Bashir Dalhatu	1997–1998	
Sunday Afolabi	1999–2000	
Mohammed Shata	2000–2003	
Iyorchia Ayu	2003–2005	
Magaji Muhammed	2005–2006	
Oluyemi Adeniji	2006–2007	
Godwin Abbe	2007–2009	
Shettima Mustapha	2009–2010	
Emmanuel Iheanacho	2010–2011	
Patrick Abba Moro	2011–2015	
Abdulrahman Bello Dambazau	2015–2019	
Rauf Adesoji Aregbesola	2019–2023	
Olubunmi Tunji-Ojo	2023–present	

*Minister of Internal Affairs
