= Movement for the Emancipation of the Niger Delta =

Militant group in Nigeria

Coordinates: 5°21′N 5°21′E

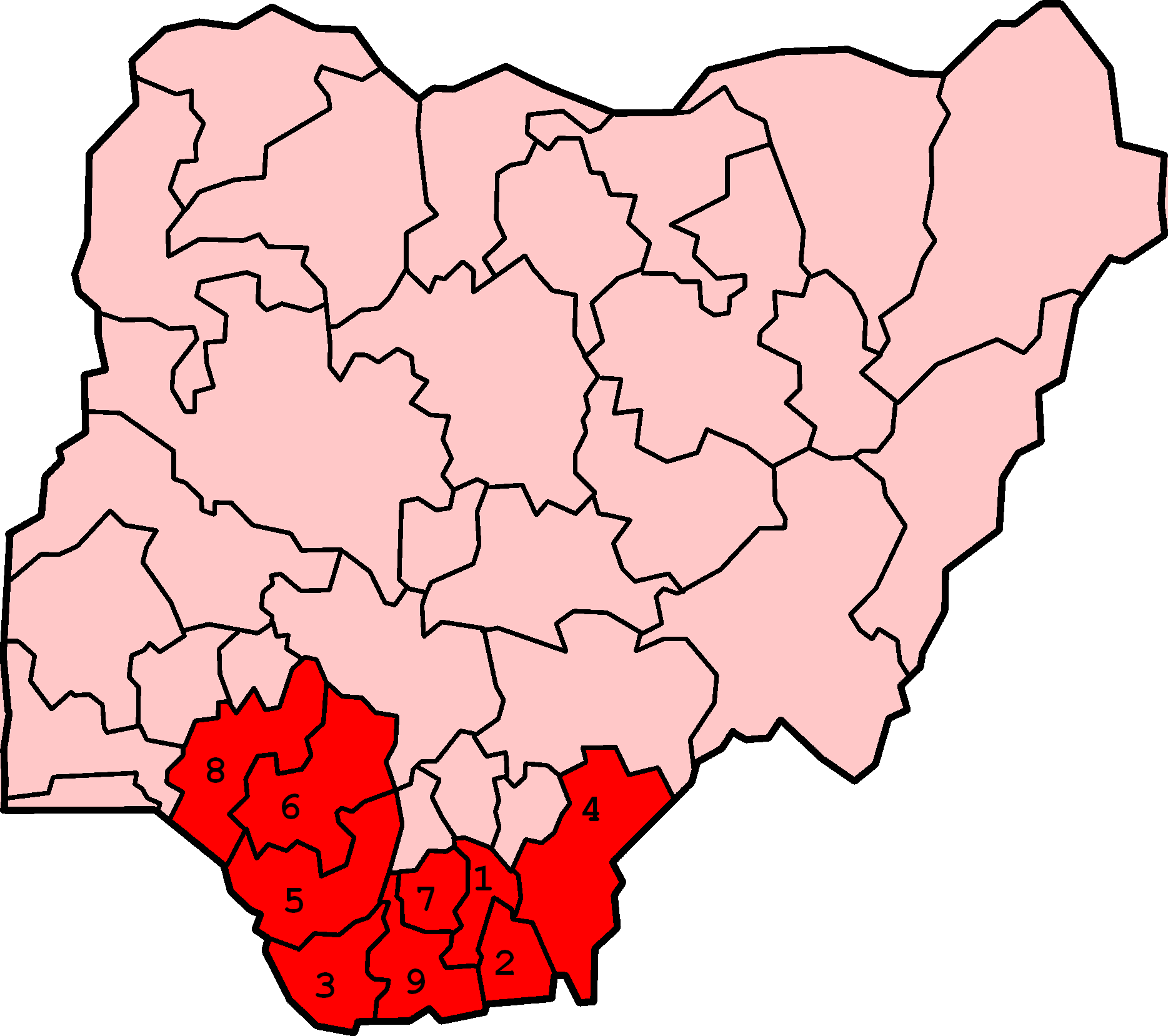
- A map of Nigeria with the states comprising the Niger Delta highlighted and numbered.
- Leaders: Henry Okah; Asari-Dokubo; Tompolo; Ebikabowei Victor-Ben †; John Togo; Godswill Tamuno; Ateke Tom; Soboma George †; Brutus Ebipadei; Solomon Ndigbara; Tubotamuno Angolia †
- Dates active: 2004-present (Ceasefire declared on 30 May 2014)
- Headquarters: Port Harcourt
- Active regions: Niger Delta
- Ideology: Regionalism
- Size: 45,000 (2009)
- Wars: Conflict in the Niger Delta

The Movement for the Emancipation of the Niger Delta (MEND) is a decentralised militant group in the Niger Delta region of Nigeria. MEND's actions – including sabotage, theft, property destruction, guerrilla warfare, and kidnapping – are part of the broader conflict in the Niger Delta and reduced Nigeria's oil production by 33% between 2006-07.

The then President Umaru Musa Yaradua administration created an amnesty program to liaise with the group to drop their arms and ammunition in 2009 and embrace government intervention in the Niger Delta region.

This amnesty was welcomed by the group as some of its top leaders, including Henry Okah and Ebikabowei Victor-Ben accepted the government's offer.

== Goals, composition, methods ==
The group's efforts are directed toward crippling oil production in the Niger Delta and exposing both the oppression of the region's people and devastation of the natural environment by the oil corporations in partnership with the federal government. Its composition includes members of the Ijaw who accuse the government and overseas oil firms with promoting massive economic inequalities, fraud, and environmental degradation. MEND’s methods include kidnapping oil workers for ransom, armed assaults on production sites, pipeline destruction, murder of Nigerian police officers, and theft of oil for sale on the black market.

MEND's other goals include localizing control of Nigeria's oil and securing reparations from the federal government for pollution caused by the oil industry. In an interview with one of the group's leaders, who used the alias Major-General Godswill Tamuno, the BBC reported that MEND was fighting for "total control" of the Niger Delta's oil wealth, saying local people had not gained from the riches under the ground and the region's creeks and swamps.

In a January 2006 email, MEND warned the oil industry --

"It must be clear that the Nigerian government cannot protect your workers or assets. Leave our land while you can or die in it... Our aim is to totally destroy the capacity of the Nigerian government to export oil."

Additionally MEND called upon then President, Olusegun Obasanjo, to free two jailed Ijaw leaders — Mujahid Dokubo-Asari, who was in jail at the time on charges of treason, and Diepreye Alamieyeseigha, a former governor of Bayelsa State convicted of corruption. Obasanjo's successor, President Umaru Musa Yar'Adua authorised the release of Dokubo-Asari and Alamieyeseigha in 2007.

== Origins and context ==
For the roughly fifty years since Nigeria declared independence from British colonial rule, oil has been produced in Nigeria. Throughout this period, corporate politics has intersected with successive dictatorships. Under these dictatorships the Nigerian government has signed laws that appropriated oil resources and placed these under the control of multinational oil companies, such as Chevron Corporation and Royal Dutch Shell.

The people of the Niger Delta have suffered catastrophic degradation of their environment due to unchecked pollution produced by the oil industry. As a result of this policy of dispossessing people from their lands in favor of foreign oil interests, within a single generation, many now have no ability to fish or farm. People who are suffering the consequences of oil extraction do not receive oil revenues.

Kenneth Roth, Executive Director of Human Rights Watch, has said of the situation:

The oil companies can't pretend they don't know what's happening all around them. The Nigerian government obviously has the primary responsibility to stop human rights abuse. But the oil companies are directly benefiting from these crude attempts to suppress dissent, and that means they have a duty to try and stop it.

Eghare W.O. Ojhogar, chief of the Ugborodo community, said: "It is like paradise and hell. They have everything. We have nothing... If we protest, they send soldiers."

Beginning in the 1980s, several political movements emerged to oppose the environmental injustices perpetrated upon the people of the Niger Delta by the government and the oil companies. These were initially nonviolent; Ken Saro-Wiwa was the most famous activist. Saro-Wiwa was an Ogoni poet-turned-activist who was executed by the Nigerian government in 1995 on what many believe to be deliberately false charges with the aim of silencing his vocal opposition to the oil interests in Nigeria. In Saro-Wiwa's footsteps came others who, having seen the government's reaction to nonviolent activism, advocated violence as resistance to what they regarded as the enslavement of their people. Militants in the delta enjoy widespread support among the region's approximately 20 million people, most of whom live in poverty despite the enormous wealth generated in the oil-rich region.

With this background, a series of meetings In November 2005 between representatives from the Federation of Niger Delta Ijaw Communities (FNDIC), the Niger Delta Peoples Volunteer Force (NDPVF), along with fighters from Cult groups such as Klansmen Konfraternity (KK) and Greenlanders led to the emergence of a new group called MEND. An agreement was also made to start using militant force to attack oil installations.

Following a string of Boko Haram bombings in Nigeria in the 2010s, and many attacks against Christian targets, MEND threatened to bomb mosques and assassinate Muslim clerics. MEND spokesman Jomo Gbomo said a campaign will start on 31 May "to save Christianity in Nigeria from annihilation. The bombings of mosques, haj camps, Islamic institutions, large congregations in Islamic events and assassinations of clerics that propagate doctrines of hate will form the core mission of this crusade." However, Operation Barbarossa would be called off if Christian organisations and the Henry Okah intervene; it further called on Boko Haram to stop attacking Christians and churches. It then announced a suspension of the plans after calls from religious groups and prominent citizens such as Henry Okah.

== Constituency and organization ==
MEND is closely connected with Asari's Niger Delta People's Volunteer Force, a rebel group with similar aims. MEND reportedly seeks "a union of all relevant militant groups in the Niger Delta." However, the identity of MEND is somewhat obscure since its leaders like to remain faceless and its cause has been taken up by completely unrelated groups inspired by the original MEND, one of which is claiming responsibility for some of the violence that has occurred. However, the original members of MEND (recognized as MEND by the United States government and Chevron security), have claimed that impostors are causing some of the violence that is now occurring.

MEND's evolving approach to conducting warfare has been described as "open source", so called because it is analogous to the decentralized communal development process now prevalent in the software industry, making it extremely quick to innovate and move new technologies and tactics rapidly from cell to cell without the direction of a vulnerable leadership hierarchy. Former United States Air Force "counter-terrorism" officer, technology analyst, and software entrepreneur, John Robb, in a Wired Magazine interview about the emergence of "open source guerrillas", alleged that MEND "doesn’t even field its own guerillas. They hire their experts and fighters mostly from criminal gangs and tribal warrior cults to do their operations."

== Timeline of activities ==
=== 2006 ===
Nine officials for the Italian petrol company Eni SpA were killed when armed members of MEND attacked Eni SpA's security forces in Port Harcourt. MEND militants briefly occupied and robbed a bank near the Eni SpA base, leaving at about 3:30 p.m, about an hour after they showed up.

A company official stated, "Eni has temporarily evacuated staff and contractors from the area of the base affected by the incident and the situation is currently under control."

MEND issued a statement regarding the oil workers: "Be assured therefore that the hostages in return, will remain our guests... the hostages are in good health and have adapted fairly well to the conditions under which the people of the Niger Delta have been kept."

On 10 May 2006, an executive with the United States-based oil company Baker Hughes was shot and killed in the south-eastern city of Port Harcourt. At the time of the shooting, it was not immediately known if MEND had any involvement or not. Witnesses say the attacker appeared to be specifically targeting the US executive.

On 2 June 2006, a Norwegian rig offshore Nigeria was attacked and 16 crew members were kidnapped. According to the news agency Reuters, MEND has not taken responsibility for this attack.

On 20 August 2006, 10 MEND members were killed by the Nigerian military. The members were working on releasing a Royal Dutch Shell hostage. In an email to REUTERS, MEND stated, "Our response to Sunday's killings will come at our time, but for certain it will not go unpunished."

On 2 October 2006, 10 Nigerian soldiers were killed off the shore of the Niger Delta in their patrol boat by a MEND mortar shell. Earlier that day a Nigerian/Royal Dutch Shell convoy was attacked in the Port Harcourt region resulting in some people being wounded.

On 3 October 2006, a militant group abducted four Scots, a Malaysian, an Indonesian and a Romanian from a bar in Akwa Ibom state.

On 4 October 2006, Nigerian soldiers attacked a militant camp, in the ensuing battle nine Nigerian soldiers were killed.

On 22 November 2006, Nigerian soldiers attempted a rescue of kidnapped oil workers which resulted in one soldier being killed.

=== 2007 ===
On 1 May 2007, at 4:15 a.m., MEND attacked Chevron's Oloibiri floating production, storage, and offloading vessel off the coast of the southern Bayelsa state. After one hour of fighting with security boats, resulting in the death of 10 people, MEND seized six expatriate workers, consisting of four Italians (Mario Celentano, Raffaele Pasceriello, Ignazio Gugliotta, Alfonso Franza), an American (John Stapelton), and a Croat (Jurica Ruic). On the same day, MEND published photos of the captives seated on white plastic chairs in a wooden shelter around the remains of a campfire.

On 3 May 2007, MEND seized eight foreign hostages from another offshore vessel. The hostages were released less than 24 hours later, stating they had intended to destroy the vessel and did not want more hostages.

23 May 7 hostages were taken from a pipelay barge of Nimbe area of Bayelsa they were released 23 days later. they included Brittins Americans and one South African.

On 8 May 2007, three major oil pipelines (one in Brass and two in the Akasa area) were attacked, shutting down oil production and cutting power to a facility run by Italian oil company Agip, part of the ENI energy group. An e-mail statement from a MEND spokesperson said, "Fighters of the Movement for the Emancipation of the Niger Delta (MEND) attacked and destroyed three major pipelines in Bayelsa state... We will continue indefinitely with attacks on all pipelines, platforms and support vessels."

On 23 September 2007, a MEND spokesperson named Jomo Gbomo announced, through a communiqué to the Philadelphia Independent Media Center, that media reports of his arrest and detention were false; and then further informed, through the letter, that MEND had officially declared war, effective 12 midnight, 23 September 2007, and that they would be commencing "attacks on installations and abduction of expatriates."

On 13 November 2007, MEND militants attacked Cameroonian soldiers on the disputed Bakassi peninsula, killing more than 20 soldiers; three days after this incident, a southern Cameroonian rebel group claimed responsibility for the attack.

=== 2008 ===
On 3 May 2008, MEND militants attacked Shell-operated pipelines in Nigeria, forcing the company to halt 170,000 barrels per day (27,000 m^{3}/d) of exports of Bonny Light crude.

On 20 June 2008, MEND naval forces attacked the Shell-operated Bonga oil platform, shutting down 10% of Nigeria's oil production in one fell swoop. The oil platform, Shell's flagship project in the area capable of extracting a massive 200,000 barrels (32,000 m^{3}) of oil a day, was widely assumed to be outside the reach of the militants due to its location 120 km off-shore. This attack has demonstrated a level of prowess and sophistication never before seen by the rebels and it is now known that all of Nigeria's oil platforms are within range of MEND attack.

On 14 September 2008, MEND inaugurated the Operation Hurricane Barbarossa with an ongoing string of militant attacks to bring down the oil industry in Rivers State.

In September 2008, MEND released a statement proclaiming that their militants had launched an "oil war" throughout the Niger Delta against both pipelines and oil production facilities, and the Nigerian soldiers that protect them. In the statement MEND claimed to have killed 22 Nigerian soldiers in one attack against a Chevron-owned oil platform. The Nigerian government confirmed that their troops were attacked in numerous locations, but said that all assaults were repelled with the infliction of heavy casualties on the militants. On 27 September, a week after declaring an oil war and destroying several significant oil production and transportation hubs in the delta, the group declared a ceasefire until "further notice" upon the intervention of Ijaw and other elders in the region.

=== 2009 ===
MEND called off its ceasefire on 30 January 2009.

Equatorial Guinea blamed MEND for an attack on the presidential palace in Malabo on 17 February, which resulted in the death of at least one attacker. MEND denied involvement.

On 15 May 2009, a military operation undertaken by a Joint Task Force (JTF) began against MEND. It came in response to the kidnapping of Nigerian soldiers and foreign sailors in the Delta region. Thousands of Nigerians have fled their villages and hundreds of people may be dead because of the offensive.

MEND has claimed responsibility for pipeline attacks on 18–21 June on three oil installations belonging to Royal Dutch Shell in the Niger Delta. In a campaign labeled by the group as "Hurricane Piper Alpha", Chevron was also warned that it would "pay a price" for allowing the Nigerian military use of an oil company airstrip.

On 18 June, MEND claimed they had blown up a Shell pipeline, as a warning to Russian president Dmitry Medvedev who was arriving to Nigeria the next day and to any potential foreign investors

On 26 June, MEND attacked the Shell Billie/Krakama pipeline as a warning to foreign investors timed with the visit to Nigeria of Russian President Dmitry Medvedev. On the 29th, MEND attacked two well clusters in an oil facility belonging to Royal Dutch Shell, at its Estuary Field.

6 July, MEND claimed responsibility for an attack on the Okan oil manifold. The pipeline was blown up at 8:45 p.m. (3:45 p.m. ET) Sunday. The militants claim that the manifold carried some 80 percent of Chevron Nigeria Limited's off-shore crude oil to a loading platform.

In a separate action on the same day, the group said that three Russians, two Filipinos and an Indian were seized Sunday from the Siehem Peace oil tanker about 30 kilometres (20 mi) from the southern port city of Escravos.

MEND carried out its first attack in Lagos late 11 July. Rebels attacked and set on fire the Atlas Cove Jetty on Tarkwa Bay, which is a major oil hub for Nigeria. Five workers were killed in the strike.

As at 17 Oct, reliable sources stated that The Movement for the Emancipation of the Niger Delta (MEND) would resume its hostilities against the Nigerian oil industry, the Nigerian Armed Forces and its collaborators with effect from (no time specified) hours, Friday, 16 October 2009," the group's spokesman, Jomo Gbomo, said in the statement.

25 Oct MEND announces unilateral truce and accepts the government's proposal for reintegration.

24 Nov MEND gunmen hijacked the oil carrier Cancale Star. 2 sailors were killed while another was wounded. When the gunmen fled the ship one gunman was overpowered by the ship's crew.

=== 2010 ===
30 Jan: MEND called off its unilateral truce and threatened an "all-out onslaught" against the oil industry.

15 March: Two bombs exploded at a Government House of Nigeria during the Post Amnesty Dialogue in Warri. The bombs killed three people and injured six more. The explosion damaged the Government House and other buildings in the area. MEND claimed responsibility for this attack.

27 August: High ranking MEND commander Soboma George is killed by some of his own soldiers. His killers say they killed him because he ordered a hit on Rivers State governor Rotimi Amaechi.

1 October: Two bombs exploded at Abuja during a parade. 12 killed 17 injured. Bomb was 1 km away from president Goodluck Jonathan. MEND claimed responsibility and also claim to have sent warning in the form of an email to a journalist half-an-hour before the bombs detonated.

2 October: MEND leader Henry Okah is arrested in Johannesburg, South Africa.

8 November: Gunmen raid an oil rig off Nigeria, kidnapping Two Americans, two Frenchmen, two Indonesians, and a Canadian. MEND claimed responsibility.

15 November: MEND attack on an Exxon Mobil oil platform, kidnapping seven Nigerian workers.

21 November: The rebels say they have sabotaged an oil pipeline feeding the refinery in Warri in the Niger Delta.

=== 2011 ===
16 March: A bomb exploded on an oil platform Agip in southern Nigeria. This is for the first MEND attack on a major bombing campaign.

19 May: MEND leader John Togo was killed during an airstrike by the Nigerian Air Force.

14 September: 14 Filipino and 9 Spanish sailors were kidnapped off the oil tanker MT Mattheos I by MEND gunmen. All 23 men were later released on 26 September.

13 October: 20 Russian sailors were kidnapped off the oil vessel MT Cape Bird. All 20 sailors were later released.

19 October: MEND gunmen hijacked the ExxonMobil tanker AHST Wilbert Tide near Opobo. The gunmen kidnapped the captain before stealing large amounts of oil. The captain was released soon after.

1 November: 3 British sailors were kidnapped off an oil vessel operated by Chevron. All 3 were released a month later in December.

=== 2012 ===
12 January: MEND militants bomb a hotel in Warri. No people were reported injured.

2 February: MEND gunmen attempted to hijack an oil carrier but are repelled by gunfire from the vessel.

4 February: MEND militants sabotage an oil pipeline belonging to Agip in Bayelsa State.

13 February: MEND gunmen shot dead the captain and chief engineer of a cargo ship 180 km (110 mi) off the coast of Nigeria.

29 February: 3 Dutch sailors were kidnapped off the coast of Rivers State after 8 MEND gunmen stormed the ship.

27 July: MEND gunmen attacked an oil carrier operated by Agip off the coast of Bayelsa State leaving 1 sailor dead.

4 August: 1 Iranian, 1 Malaysian, and 1 Thai sailors were kidnapped off an oil carrier 56 km (35 mi) off the Nigerian coast. During a gun battle with the Nigerian Navy 2 Nigerian soldiers were killed by the militants.

5 September: MEND gunmen hijacked the oil tanker Abu Dhabi Star 23 km (14 mi) off the coast of Nigeria. The gunmen managed to steal a large amount of oil and narrowly escaped capture by the Nigerian Navy.

6 October: An oil tanker off the coast of the Ivory Coast was hijacked by pirates affiliated to MEND. The pirates held the 25-man crew for 3 days before they stole 400 m^{3} (2,500 bbl) of oil from the ship.

15 October: MEND gunmen kidnapped 7 sailors aboard the Bourbon Liberty 249. All 7 were released on 1 November for an unknown amount of ransom.

13 December: MEND gunmen attacked the oil carrier PM Salem, killing 1 and injuring 2.

17 December: 5 Indian sailors aboard the SP Brussels were kidnapped by MEND militants. The entire ship was looted and set ablaze about 64 km (40 mi) from shore. All 5 men were later released on 27 January 2013 for ransom.

20 December: 4 South Korean oil workers were kidnapped by MEND gunmen from an oil plant in the Niger Delta. All 4 men were released on 23 December.

23 December: 3 Italian sailors aboard the Asso Ventuno were kidnapped during a raid on the ship. All 3 men were released on 9 January 2013.

30 December: MEND gunmen attacked an oil barge operated by Agip in Rivers State. No oil workers were killed or kidnapped.

=== 2013 ===
9 January: MEND militants and the Nigerian soldiers got into a gun battle in Ogun State after they were seen stealing oil out of a pipeline. The gun battle resulted in the explosion of the pipeline killing 7 militants and 3 Nigerian soldiers as well as 40 people in a nearby village.

4 February: MEND militants hijacked a Filipino operated oil vessel near Bonny Island. 1 sailor was killed and another was kidnapped.

5 February: MEND militants were responsible for attacking and destroying an oil barge operated by an Indian company. During the ensuing battle 4 Indian oil workers were killed.

7 February: 2 Russians and 1 Romanian sailors were kidnapped from a British cargo ship. The gunmen looted and heavily damaged the ship. The 3 men were later released on 13 March.

7 February: MEND militants attacked and briefly hijacked the Armada Tugas oil carrier. No sailors were kidnapped or injured.

10 February: MEND militants attacked the Walvis 7 oil carrier. No sailors were kidnapped or injured.

17 February: 6 Russian sailors were kidnapped aboard the Armada Tuah 101 cargo ship. All 6 men were released on 26 February for 200 million Naira ($1.3 million) ransom.

22 February: 2 Pakistani sailors were kidnapped off of an oil carrier. 1 of the sailors was released on 7 March while the other has yet to be released.

1 March: The Nigerian Navy captured 33 pirates affiliated to MEND off the coast of Lagos.

2 March: MEND gunmen attacked the fishing vessel Orange 7 80 km (50 mi) off shore. No sailors were taken captive.

4 March: MEND militants were responsible for sabotaging an oil pipeline operated by Royal Dutch Shell.

5 March: MEND gunmen hijacked an oil carrier. The gunmen looted and heavily damaged the ship while stealing large amounts of oil and money.

7 March: 3 Malaysian sailors were kidnapped aboard the Armada Tuah 22. The 3 men were freed on 22 March after the Joint Task Force raided a MEND camp while also capturing 4 militants.

20 March: MEND militants sabotaged an oil pipeline operated by Chevron in Delta State near Warri.

26 March: MEND leader Henry Okah is sentenced to 24 years in prison by a South African court for the October 2010 Abuja attacks. MEND threatens violence and has said "The gates of hell have just been let loose."

31 March: The Joint Task Force captured 12 MEND gunmen while stealing oil out of a pipeline.

4 April: MEND spokesmen Jomo Gbomo sent an email to president Goodluck Jonathan stating that starting on 5 April MEND would resume hostilities on Nigerian oil installations.

5 April: MEND militants who had accepted amnesty 4 years earlier stormed the Nigerian National Assembly demanding more than what the government had given them. The ex-militants threatened to return to fighting if their demands were not met.

6 April: 12 Nigerian Police officers were killed by MEND gunmen in Bayelsa State. The police were shot at while escorting an ex-militant who had stolen money from MEND a year earlier.

11 April: 3 MEND militants were arrested in Bayelsa State for the murder of 12 police officers 5 days earlier.

13 April: MEND militants bomb and destroy Oil Well 62 operated by Royal Dutch Shell in Bayelsa State.

16 April: MEND spokesman Jomo Gbomo sent an e-mail to Bloomberg News threatening to "bomb mosques, hajj camps, and other Islamic institutions." Gbomo calls this "Operation Save Christianity" and says this is in response to the bombings of churches in northern Nigeria.

22 April: 21 MEND militants were captured by the Joint Task Force in a boat containing 400 m^{3} (2,500 bbl) of stolen oil.

22 April: 2 Russian and 2 Ukrainian sailors were kidnapped by MEND gunmen 160 km (100 mi) off the coast of Bayelsa State. All 4 men were released on 26 May after the camp they were held in was seized by the Joint Task Force.

23 April: Nigerian soldiers invade Bayelsa communities in search of MEND militants. This has thrown the Niger Delta into a state confusion and panic due to the past massacres in Odi and Zaki Biam.

27 April: The Joint Task Force raided 7 MEND camps in Bayelsa State but were unable to capture any militants. The JTF later destroyed the camps by setting them on fire.

28 April: 76 MEND militants were captured by the Joint Task Force while stealing oil out of a pipeline near the city of Yenagoa.

28 April: 9 oil workers were kidnapped by MEND gunmen off an oil installation operated by Royal Dutch Shell. The kidnappers are thought to be responsible for the murder of 12 police officers 3 weeks earlier.

29 April: 3 Sri Lankan, 1 Russian, and 1 Burmese sailors were kidnapped by MEND gunmen off the coast of Brass. Reports say 14 MEND gunmen raided the cargo ship stealing money, electronics, and a watch-dog. All of the men were released on 14 May after a ransom was paid.

5 May: 8 ex-militants were killed by MEND gunmen in Yenagoa after they were found out to be collaborating with the Joint Task Force. A gunfight erupted when the MEND gunmen were spotted by Nigerian Police.

12 May: MEND gunmen kidnapped the daughter of Nigerian supreme court judge Bode Rhodes-Vivour. A ransom was paid 2 hours after her abduction and the militants released her soon after.

14 May: MEND gunmen attacked 10 passenger boats on the Niger River while on their way to a funeral. All of the passengers were robbed of their belongings and one man was doused in petrol and almost set on fire when he refused to hand over his cell phone.

28 May: 12 Pakistani and 5 Nigerian sailors were kidnapped off the oil tanker MT Matrix 64 km (40 mi) off the coast of Bayelsa State. The entire crew was released on 6 June without a ransom being paid.

13 June: Pirates affiliated to MEND hijacked the French oil tanker Adour 48 km (30 mi) off the coast of Togo. The pirates took one sailor hostage before fleeing from the Nigerian Navy. The sailor was eventually freed on 18 June when the Joint Task Force seized the pirates camp.

15 June: MEND militants succeeded in blowing up 2 gasoline tankers in Abaji, 124 km (77 mi) south of Abuja. MEND spokesman Jomo Gbomo warned drivers of gasoline tankers to "keep a safe distance from their trucks".

19 June: 2 Indian and 2 Polish sailors were kidnapped by pirates affiliated to MEND after the oil vessel MDPL Continental One was attacked 48 km (30 mi) off the Nigerian coast.

14 July: Militants detonate and destroy a crude oil pipeline in Rivers State. The perpetrators are thought to affiliated to MEND.

16 July: Pirates hijacked the Turkish oil carrier MT Cotton 24 km (15 mi) off the coast of Port-Gentil, Gabon. The pirates took the 24-man crew hostage before fleeing back to Nigeria with their captives and large amounts of crude oil.

15 August: Pirates hijacked the Saint Kitts and Nevis flagged oil vessel MT Notre. The pirates were able to keep the entire crew hostage for 4 days until a Nigerian Navy vessel intercepted the ship and killed 12 pirates while 4 surrendered peacefully.

=== 2025 ===
In early 2025, MEND took part in attacks on oil infrastructure in Bayelsa State, with some of these attacks being framed as a form of opposition to Nigerian President Bola Tinubu.

== See also ==
- Niger Delta People's Volunteer Force
- Movement for the Actualization of the Sovereign State of Biafra
- Ijaw Youths
- Petroleum in Nigeria
- Ken Saro-Wiwa
- Isaac Adaka Boro
- Henry Okah
- Sweet Crude Documentary
