= Odis =

ODIS is the Offender Data Information System.

ODIS may also refer to:

ODIs is the plural of ODI (see ODI (disambiguation)). It most often refers to:

- One Day International, a form of limited overs cricket, played between two teams with international status, in which each team faces a fixed number of overs
- Oral direct inhibitor, a type of anticoagulant

Odis is a given name. Notable people with this name include:

- Odis Flores (born 1987), American rapper
- Odis McKinney (born 1957), American football player
