= Asari Dokubo =

Former Niger-Delta militant

Asari-Dokubo
- Born: Melford Dokubo Goodhead Jr. June 1, 1964 (age 62); Buguma, Nigeria
- Years active: 1998–present

Asari-Dokubo (born 1 June 1964), formerly Melford Goodhead Jr. and typically referred to simply as Asari, is a major political figure of the Ijaw ethnic group in the Niger Delta region of Nigeria. He was president of the Ijaw Youth Council for a time beginning in 2001 and later founded the Niger Delta People's Volunteer Force which would become one of the most prominent armed groups operating in the Niger Delta region. He is a Muslim with populist views and an anti-government stance that have made him a folk hero amongst certain members of the local population.

== Early life ==
Asari was born in 1964 into a middle class Christian family headed by a court judge and a housewife in Buguma, Rivers State, who also had four other children. He received both primary and secondary education in Port Harcourt and was accepted into law school at the University of Calabar but dropped out after only three years in 1990, citing problems with university authorities as his reason for doing so. He made other attempts to complete his education but his activism caused him to quit on his degree at Rivers State University of Science and Technology for reasons similar to those at Calabar, Cross Rivers State, Nigeria.

== Activism ==
After dropping out of school, Asari converted to Islam and changed his name to Mujahid Dokubo-Asari to reflect this. He spent much of the 1990s attempting to become involved in regional politics, running for two offices in Rivers State in 1992 and 1998 but failing to win on either.

In 1998, the Ijaw Youth Council (IYC) was formed and Asari, as a founding member, was appointed to the vice-presidency of the organization. The organization issued the Kaiama Declaration in November, expressing long-held Ijaw concerns about the loss of control of their homeland and their own lives to the Nigerian state and oil companies operating in the region.

The declaration and a letter addressed to oil companies called on them to suspend operations and withdraw from Ijaw territory. The IYC pledged “to struggle peacefully for freedom, self-determination and ecological justice,” and prepared a campaign of celebration, prayer, and direct action - 'Operation Climate Change' beginning December 28. The Nigerian government responded with an immediate crackdown on the group.

Asari became the IYC's president in 2001 and led the group to pursue an agenda of "Resource Control and Self Determination By Every Means Necessary".

By 2004, Asari had retreated from public view. He would go on to create the Niger Delta People's Volunteer Force (NDPVF), which would emerge as a major catalyst for unrest in the Delta region. The NDPVF, a militant group, was funded in large part by local and regional politicians who sought great profits from the region's oil revenue. The NDPVF quickly escalated an armed conflict with a rival group, known as the Niger Delta Vigilante (NDV), who were also seeking to control the Delta's oil resources.

Combat was concentrated primarily in Warri and subsequently, Nigeria's oil capital Port Harcourt, as well as areas to the city's southwest. Both groups engaged in oil 'bunkering' and other illegal forms of local resource extraction.

A change in political ideals by the NDPVF caused the group's former sponsors to withdraw their financial support, and begin funneling funds to the rival NDV. Asari's NDPVF then made a declaration of "all-out war" against the Nigerian state.

Although Asari has clearly stated that he does not align himself with any particular Biafra independence organization, he has appeared at events in the past with Ralph Uwazurike of MASSOB. He has also in various interviews praised Nnamdi Kanu of the Indigenous People of Biafra.

== Crisis and arrest ==
The threats to attack oil wells and pipelines by the NDPVF caused companies operating in the area to withdraw most of their personnel from the Delta, resulting in a massive drop in oil production of 30,000 barrels per day and pushing up the price of petroleum worldwide significantly. Due to the crisis this precipitated, Nigerian President Olusegun Obasanjo called Asari and the leader of the NDV, Ateke Tom to Abuja for peace talks which were in large part a failure.

After his refusal to endorse the legitimacy of the Olusegun Obasanjo government and due to his public support for self-determination of his native Ijaw people and independence for the Niger Delta, Asari was arrested and charged with treason by the Nigerian federal government.

On 14 June 2007, Asari was released on bail as part of new President Umaru Yar'Adua's pledge to try to bring peace to the Niger Delta region.

== Pipeline security contract ==
As part of Yar'adua amnesty incentives to eliminate militants activities in the Niger Delta, the federal government awarded massive cash rewards to Asari and other former militant leaders of the Niger Delta.

Asari received an annual cash payment of US$10 million a year from Abuja as part of the federal "pipeline security protection fee" to protect the Rivers State pipelines and creeks that the militants bombed, kidnapped and killed the workers and guards in the areas.

== Dual citizenship ==
In 2013, Dokubo Asari became a citizen of Benin and moved his wealth and assets out of the Niger Delta, Nigeria and relocated to Cotonou, Benin Republic where he built several schools, colleges and a university for the school children and students in Cotonou.

== See also ==
- Conflict in the Niger Delta
- Niger Delta Development Commission
- Petroleum in Nigeria
