= Arewa =

"The north" in Hausa

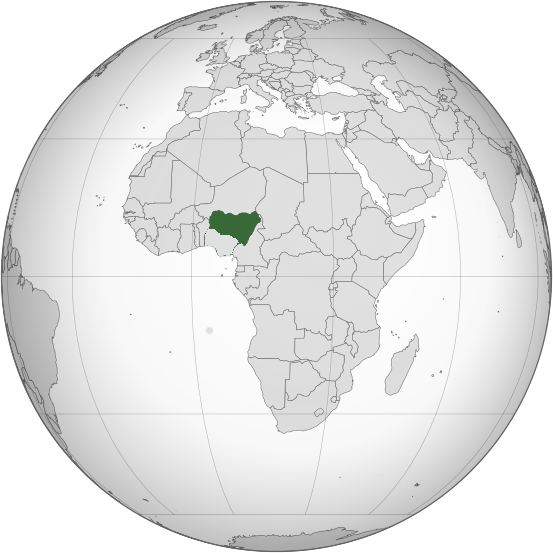
Location of Arewa in Nigeria

Arewa or Arewaland is a Hausa word which means "The North". The term is used to refer to Northern Nigeria general. The terms Arewa (literally "north") and Arewacin Nijeriya (literally "Northern Nigeria") are used in Hausa to refer to the historic region geopolitically located north of the River Niger.

The continued use of the term, Arewa ... has conjured up an image among educated Northerners that resonated far beyond the institutional structures Sir Ahmadu Bello created: the successor to the Bornu and Sokoto Caliphate; the vision of God's Empire in the region. The universality of its claim to suzerainty; and in a more prosaic but no less powerful sense, the concept of a polity with an emphasis on unity and sense of shared purpose in northern West Africa beyond the popular slogan--'one North, one People'.

In the history of Nigeria specifically, it is used to refer to the pre-1967 Northern Region, Nigeria. In Niger, it has a very specific meaning: a small pre-colonial animist dominated state of the Dallol Maouri valley, known for the indigenous "Maouri"/"Mawri" Hausa culture. In Nigeria, some towns have been called simply "Arewa" in the past, before British colonisation.

In recent years, the Northern Region has gained prominence in the digital space, with the rise of news websites and online platforms that focus on the region's affairs. One such platform is AREWA.ng, a news website that primarily covers news from Northern Nigeria.

The Arewa region is home to a broad spectrum of cultures, ethnicities, and languages, with Hausa being the dominant language. Other languages like Fulfulde, Kanuri also play significant roles in the cultural and social fabric of Northern Nigeria. The region’s political and historical identity has deep roots in the pre-colonial Sokoto Caliphate and Kanem-Borno Empire. Today, it remains a critical part of Nigeria’s political landscape.

== Usage ==
In post independence Nigeria, some use the word as a general term for Nigerian Hausaland: a contraction of "Arewacin Nijeriya" (Northern Nigeria). Much of the north was once politically united in the Northern Region, a multi-ethnic entity, and was previously home of the seven Hausa states, later the Sokoto Caliphate in the pre-colonial period, and the Northern Nigeria Protectorate under British colonial rule.

Northern Nigeria regionalist groups, such as the Arewa Consultative Forum, and the related Arewa House are examples of this. These groups do not advocate independence from Nigeria, albeit, focus on unity of the Hausa–Fulani which forms the majority in the north. And as such, the term has become synonymous with machinations in lieu of extending political and cultural hegemony to capture the federal state.

== States ==
Northern Nigeria consists of 19 states divided into three geopolitical zones: North West, North East, and North Central. These states include:

1. North West

Jigawa State

Kaduna State

Kano State

Katsina State

Kebbi State

Sokoto State

Zamfara State

2. North East

Adamawa State

Bauchi State

Borno State

Gombe State

Taraba state

Yobe State

3. North Central

Kogi state

Kwara state

Nasarawa state

Niger state

Plateau state

== Languages ==
Northern Nigeria is highly diverse in terms of ethnicity and languages. Hausa is the most widely spoken language in the vast region due to migration and trade, followed by Fulfulde. Here are examples of the languages spoken:

1. Hausa

The Hausa language is the most widely spoken language in Northern Nigeria and serves as a lingua franca for many communities. It is spoken across most northern states, especially in the North West and parts of the North East.

2. Fulfulde (Fula/Fulani)

Fulfulde is spoken by the Fulani people, who are spread across various states in the North West and North East regions. Fulfulde is also spoken by the pastoralist communities in other parts of West Africa.

3. Kanuri

The Kanuri language is predominantly spoken in Borno and Yobe States, especially in areas around Maiduguri. The Kanuri people have a long history as part of the Borno Empire.

== Religion ==
The majority of people in the Arewa region are Sunni Muslims, with a larger number adhering to Sufi brotherhoods. Islamic culture and Sharia law influence many aspects of daily life. There is a small minority of Christians and traditional religionists in the region.
