= Maiduguri Maximum Security Prison =

Prison in Maiduguri, Borno State, Nigeria

Coordinates: 11.896°N 13.099°E

The Maiduguri Maximum Security Prison (Correctional Centre) is a detention facility based in Maiduguri, Nigeria, the Borno State capital. As of 2019, it had 486 inmates, including 71 condemned inmates awaiting execution.

== Human rights and sexual abuses ==
In January 2019, Charles Okah, an inmate serving a life jail term in the prison, released a diary of well documented human rights abuses in the prison in a book he wrote. Oka detailed how an 11 years old boy suffering from mental condition similar to Autism had been held in the prison since he was eight years old in same cell holding condemned criminal who sodomised him. The document also detailed how prison officials used inmates for cheap labour and carried out forced abortions on women they allegedly impregnated.

An Amnesty International investigation report released in April 2019 was consistent with the report of Charle Oka. The Amnesty report detailed how human rights abuses including sexual abuse of women and children at the Maiduguri Maximum Security Prison and Giwa Barracks detention centre were perpetrated against children held in same cells with adults. Amnesty interviewed former detainees and a former prison warder who independently confirmed that sexual abuses of children were widespread in the facilities. Three women former detainees stated that they witnessed sexual attacks in the prison and sometimes cries could be heard in the cells indicating that sexual abuse was occurring. Following the reports, some prison officials were arrested but released the next day, prosecuting them.
