= Soboma George =

Nigerian military commander and gang leader

- Died: 24 August 2010
- Known for: "Outlaws", a cult gang

Soboma George (died 24 August 2010) was a militant in both the Movement for the Emancipation of the Niger Delta and The Outlaws. In August 2009 George accepted an amnesty offer made by the Nigerian government, under President Umaru Musa Yar'Adua. George reportedly escaped multiple arrests and assassination attempts before being killed on 24 August 2010, in Port Harcourt.

Until his death, Soboma led The Outlaws, a cult gang, and was a notorious commander of MEND. In 2007, a joint military operation claimed to have tracked and killed George, but these claims proved to be rumors. George was one of the militant gang leaders to embrace Yar'adua's amnesty in August 2009.

In events leading up to his death, George allegedly ordered Fiofori and two other men to assassinate Peremobowei Ebebi, former Deputy Governor of Bayelsa. Fiofori and others reportedly killed George instead of Ebebi. Emmanuel Gladstone and Dobra Ogbe were arrested in connection with George's death.
