= Shettima Mustafa =

Nigerian politician (1939–2022)

Shettima Mustafa OFR

Federal Minister of Agriculture
- In office August 1990 – 1992

Federal Minister of Defense
- In office 17 December 2008 – 14 July 2009
- Preceded by: Mahmud Yayale Ahmed
- Succeeded by: Godwin Abbe

Federal Minister of Interior
- In office 14 July 2009 – 17 March 2010
- Preceded by: Godwin Abbe
- Succeeded by: Emmanuel Iheanacho

Personal details
- Born: 26 November 1939 Nguru, British Nigeria
- Died: 17 November 2022 (aged 82)
- Party: Nigerian People's (1983); Peoples Democratic (from 1998)
- Education: Ahmadu Bello University; University of Cambridge; Purdue University

Shettima Mustafa OFR (26 November 1939 – 17 November 2022) was a Nigerian academic and politician. After an early career in medicine, local administration, and media, Mustafa studied agriculture at university, eventually earning a Doctor of Philosophy degree. He became a commissioner in Borno State and joined the Nigerian People's Party, becoming their vice-presidential candidate in 1983. He was jailed after the military coup of December 1983 led by Muhammadu Buhari. After his release in 1985 he taught agriculture at the University of Maiduguri and became head of the Jos region of the Federal Ministry of Agriculture. Mustafa served as Minister of Agriculture from 1990 to 1992, and in 2007 was appointed Minister of Defence in the cabinet of President Umaru Yar'Adua. In 2008 he became Minister of the Interior but left office with the 2010 dissolution of the cabinet.

== Background ==
Shettima Mustafa was born on 26 November 1939 in Nguru, now in Yobe State. He attended Borno middle school in Maiduguri (from 1946 to 1952, and trained as a medical field assistant in Kano from 1955 to 1956. He worked in the Borno Native Administration from 1954 to 1964, and then with Radio Television Kaduna until 1967. At age 28, he was admitted into Ahmadu Bello University, graduating in 1972 and then working as a researcher with the university's Institute for Agricultural Research, from 1973 to 1974. He attended the University of Cambridge, where he earned a postgraduate diploma in applied biology. He continued to work towards a PhD, attending Purdue University, Indiana in the United States in 1978, and obtaining his PhD in 1979. He also completed a course in agricultural projects monitoring and evaluation at the University of East Anglia in 1990.

Mustafa died on 17 November 2022, at age 82.

== Public career ==
Shettima Mustafa was appointed a commissioner in the Borno State government under Governor Mohammed Goni. He rose steadily in the political ranks and was vice-presidential candidate on the Nigerian People's Party platform in the 1983 election. However, the incumbent Shehu Shagari of the National Party of Nigeria (NPN) won the election. After the military coup of December 1983 in which Major General Muhammadu Buhari came to power, he was jailed until 1985. On his release he returned to part-time teaching at the University of Maiduguri. He then became a regional head in Jos the Federal Ministry of Agriculture. In August 1990, Shettima Mustafa was appointed Minister of Agriculture and Natural Resources, holding that post until the cabinet dissolved in 1992.

Following this, he became an advisor to various local and international organisations, and became the national treasurer of the People's Democratic Party (PDP), a position he held between 1998 and 2001. He became a fellow of the Genetic Society of Nigeria, a member of the American Society of Agronomy and a member of the Agricultural Society of Nigeria. He was chair of the Presidential Visitation Panel to the University of Agriculture in 1999, and chairman of Savannah Bank from April 2000 to August 2001. In November 2000 Mustafa was appointed to the Order of the Federal Republic. In 2002, Shettima Mustafa was nominated to the board of the Savannah Bank, although he was not a shareholder. By 2004 he was chairman of the Presidential National Tree Nursery Development Committee.

== Yar'Adua Cabinet ==
Shettima Mustafa was appointed Defence Minister of Nigeria by President Umaru Yar'Adua. On 14 July 2008, he traded places with Godwin Abbe, becoming Minister of the Interior. He left office in March 2010 when Acting President Goodluck Jonathan dissolved his cabinet.
