= Ateke Tom =

Ruler of Okochiri Kingdom in Nigeria

- First Amanyanabo of Okochiri Kingdom

Amanyanabo of Okochiri Kingdom
- Reign: 2017 - present
- Born: 2 June 1964 (age 62); Okrika, Rivers State, Nigeria

Ateke Tom (born 2 June 1964) is a traditional ruler and the first Amanyanabo of Okochiri Kingdom, who was the former leader of the Niger Delta Vigilante, an ethnic Ijaw militia in the Niger Delta region of Nigeria. In August 2007, following days of gun fights between various militia groups and security forces in Port Harcourt, Ateke Tom wrote to the Governor of Rivers State Celestine Omehia, requesting amnesty in response to an offer of clemency and rehabilitation the government had offered to militia who surrendered.

On 1 October 2009, the 49th anniversary of Nigerian independence and three days before the closing of a government amnesty program, Tom willingly surrendered to President Umaru Musa Yar'Adua at the Government House, Abuja, in 2007. The presidential jet was sent to fly Tom to Abuja, and the President stated, "Today, Chief Tom Ateke you have given me my 49th independence anniversary gift and I cherish it so much." Also present at the surrender were Vice President Goodluck Jonathan, Minister of Defense General Godwin Abbe, Secretary to the Government of the Federation Yayale Ahmed, Chief of Defense Staff Paul Dike and National Security Advisor Abdullahi Sarki Mukhtar, among others.

On 25 November 2017, Ateke Tom was crowned as the first Amanyanabo of Okochiri. The coronation was attended by Ezenwo Wike, Governor of Rivers State.

== See also ==
- Petroleum in Nigeria
- Nigerian Oil Crisis
- Ijaw
