= Niger Delta Vigilante =

Nigerian secessionist militia

- Leader: Ateke Tom
- Dates active: 2003–2009
- Headquarters: unknown
- Active regions: Niger Delta
- Ideology: Secession from Nigeria
- Size: 4,000
- Wars: Conflict in the Niger Delta

The Niger Delta Vigilante (abbreviated NDV) is an armed militia group in the Niger Delta region of Nigeria. The NDV is led by Ateke Tom. The group is composed primarily by ethnic Ijaws from in and around Port Harcourt and their main goal is controlling the area's vast oil/petrol resources. In late 2003 the NDV precipitated a conflict with their rival Ijaw ethnic militia, the Niger Delta People's Volunteer Force (NDPVF). The two groups spent most of 2004 in an escalating conflict which was ended when the Nigerian government and military eventually intervened on the side of the NDV in summer of 2004. The government's support of the NDV would eventually precipitate the Nigerian oil crisis, beginning in October 2004.

== See also ==
- Petroleum in Nigeria
