= Olubunmi Tunji-Ojo =

Nigerian politician and engineer (born 1982)

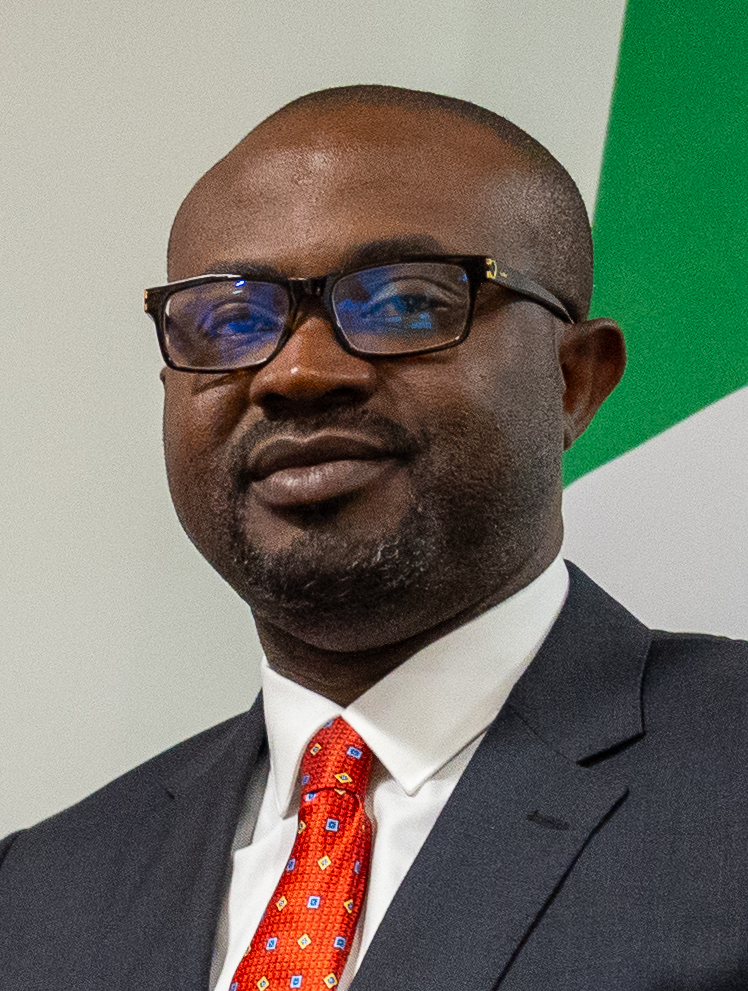
- Olubunmi Tunji-Ojo in 2024

Minister of Interior
- Incumbent
- Assumed office 21 August 2023
- President: Bola Tinubu
- Preceded by: Rauf Aregbesola

Member of the House of Representatives of Nigeria from Ondo
- In office 11 June 2019 – 21 August 2023
- Constituency: Akoko North East/Akoko North West

Personal details
- Born: 1 May 1982 (age 44) Okeagbe Akoko, Ondo State, Nigeria
- Party: All Progressives Congress
- Spouse: Abimbola Tunji-Ojo
- Children: 2
- Education: Obafemi Awolowo University; London Metropolitan University
- Occupation: Politician; engineer; entrepreneur; philanthropist
- Website: bto.ng

Olubunmi Tunji-Ojo (born 1 May 1982) is a Nigerian engineer, entrepreneur, philanthropist and politician who is the current minister of interior of Nigeria. He was a member of the House of Representatives of Nigeria representing Akoko North East/Akoko North West Federal Constituency of Ondo State from 2019 to 2023.

During his first term in the house of representatives, he was the chairman of the House Committee on Niger Delta Development Commission (NDDC). On 26 February 2023, he was re-elected as the federal lawmaker representing Akoko North East and North West Federal Constituency. However, he resigned his membership of the lower chamber of the National Assembly after being appointed by President Bola Tinubu as minister of Interior on 16 August 2023.

== Early life and education ==
Bunmi Tunji-Ojo, popularly called BTO was born in Oyin Akoko, Ondo State, Nigeria. He attended Ansarudeen Primary School, Oyin Akoko from 1987 to 1990 and Hakda International school in Kaduna from 1990 to 1992 before completing his primary education at Universal Primary School, Akure in 1993. He then proceeded to FUTA staff secondary school, Akure for his secondary education where he was elected the senior prefect in 1998.

In 1999, he gained admission into Obafemi Awolowo University, Ile-Ife to study Electrical and Electronics Engineering. In 2002, while in his third year at the Obafemi Awolowo University, he proceeded to the University of North London (now London Metropolitan University) where he studied Electronics and Communication Engineering and graduated in 2005. He obtained a Post Graduate Qualification in Digital Communication and Networking from the same institution in 2006. He holds certifications in multiple professional qualifications in ICT including the prestigious title of being one of the first set of certified ethical hackers from Royal Britannia IT Training Academy in the United Kingdom before he turned 24 years.

== Career ==
Before his advent into politics, Tunji-Ojo was a business and management executive with a career in ICT, becoming the CEO of a leading indigenous ICT consultant company in Nigeria, Matrix IT Solutions Limited, at the age of 24. As a professional, he holds a certification in Ethical Hacking and Counter Measures. He is also a certified CompTIA Network Plus Engineer and a Britannia Hardware A+ Management Certificate Holder.

In Nigeria, he consulted for the World Bank and government agencies, including Petroleum Technology Development Fund (PTDF), Joint Admission and Matriculation Board (JAMB), National Film and Video Censors Board (NFVCB), Nigerian Content Development and Monitoring Board (NCDMB), National Health Insurance Scheme, Abuja (NHIS), Nigeria Sovereign Investment Authority (NSIA), various committees of the Senate and House of Representatives of the Federal Republic of Nigeria, Nigeria Gas Company, National Commission for Mass Literacy, Adult and Non-Formal Education among others.

In collaboration with the Senate Committee on Petroleum Resources (Upstream), Ministry of Petroleum Resources, Nigerian National Petroleum Corporation (NNPC), Petroleum Technology Development Fund (PTDF), Nigerian Content Development and Monitoring Board (NCDMB), he pioneered the first Nigerian Content Workshop (NCW) in 2016, a forum for all stakeholders in the Oil and Gas Industry to discuss freely on the Policy Framework to improve indigenous participation and making use of the Nigerian Content Policy to domicile the best global productivity and performances in Nigeria. One of the goals of the workshop was to address the thematic issues, challenges, concerns, and ways forward and this was achieved with thirteen papers delivered and deliberated upon by speakers including Aminu Galadima (Ag. Executive Secretary, Petroleum Technology Development Fund); Bank Anthony Okoroafor (Chairman, Petroleum Technology Association of Nigeria); Waziri Adio (Executive Secretary, Nigeria Extractive Industries Transparency Initiative); Geoff Onuoha (Chairman, Pipeline Professionals’ association of Nigeria, PLAN); Tunde Adelana (Director, M&ED, Nigerian Content Development and Monitoring Board); Alhaji Habibu Abdullahi (Managing Director, Nigerian Ports Authority); Osagie Okunbor (Country Chair, Shell Companies in Nigeria and Managing Director, SPDC); Godwin Emefiele (Governor, Central Bank of Nigeria); Tonye Cole (MD, Sahara Group); Taofeek Adegbite (Chief Executive, Marine Platforms Ltd) among others.

== Politics ==
In 2019, he was elected into the House of Representatives of Nigeria to represent Akoko North East/Akoko North West Federal Constituency of Ondo State on the platform of the All Progressives Congress (APC). Upon his inauguration, he mobilized 246 other lawmakers to support the speakership ambition of the Speaker, Rt. Hon. Femi Gbajabiamila, under the forum of first-timers lawmakers, chaired by him. Months later, he was appointed by the Speaker of the House, Rt. Hon. Femi Gbajabiamila as the Chairman of the House Committee on Niger Delta Development Commission (NDDC). He led the House of Representatives Committee to probe alleged malfeasance of over 80 billion Naira in the commission, making it the first time a probe will be launched into the financial activities of the NDDC in its over twenty years of existence. In March 2021, his proposed bill to repeal the NDDC Act which will make abuse of office impossible, a bill that passed the first reading.

Tunji-Ojo was also a member of House of Representatives Committees on National Security and Intelligence, Local Content, Gas Resources, North East Development Commission (NEDC), Housing, FCT Area Council and Ancillary Matters, Solid Minerals and Pilgrims Affairs. Also on 26 February, he was re-elected as the federal lawmaker representing Akoko North East and North West Federal Constituency. At the start of the 10th assembly, he was the Director General of the campaign team of Hon. Tajudeen Abass, who later became the speaker of the house of representative. Few weeks into the start of his tenure as a second term lawmaker in the 10th assembly, he was appointed minister of Interior by president Bola Tinubu and was sworn in on 21 August 2023.

On 22 January 2021, he was awarded Honorary Doctorate Degree in Public Administration by Joseph Ayo Babalola University (JABU) Ikeji Arakeji, Osun State. He is a recipient of the Sir Ahmadu Bello Platinum Leadership Award of Excellence as well as the Kwame Nkrumah Leadership Award as a Worthy Ambassador of African Youth.

Ministerial Reforms and Achievements

Hon. (Dr.) Olubunmi Tunji-Ojo, as Nigeria’s Minister of Interior, has implemented a series of transformative reforms across key agencies under his supervision. His leadership has focused on modernizing immigration services, strengthening border security, improving paramilitary welfare, regulating mining activities, enhancing school security, and addressing correctional facility challenges.

As Chairman of the Civil Defence, Correctional, Fire and Immigration Services Board (CDCFIB), he has expedited promotion exercises to prevent career stagnation and approved allowances, salary increments, and the establishment of the Paramilitary Pensions Board. Under his leadership, a record 32,361 personnel across the Ministry of Interior have been promoted, alongside the introduction of a more transparent and streamlined recruitment process. His tenure has also seen the timely decoration of officers into new ranks, ensuring greater motivation within the services.

At the Nigeria Security and Civil Defence Corps (NSCDC), he facilitated the promotion of 21,385 personnel and inaugurated the Mining Marshal, a special force designed to protect mining sites across Nigeria and curb illegal mining activities. Recognizing the dangers of unregulated mining, his administration has strengthened enforcement efforts to prevent environmental degradation and illegal exploitation of resources. His leadership has also enhanced operational capacity by commissioning a fleet of surveillance vehicles and launching a new camouflage uniform for the Corps. He has supported the Safe Schools Initiative, a program designed to protect students and educational institutions from security threats. Through this initiative, security measures have been reinforced across schools nationwide to prevent kidnappings and attacks on learning institutions. Officers under the Corps have been encouraged to pursue further education, with many enrolling in degree programs, including MSc and PhDs, while a committee has been constituted to design a sustainable standard operating procedure for the Corps.

In his oversight of the Nigerian Correctional Service (NCoS), he approved the promotion of 4,498 personnel in 2023. He initiated a nationwide decongestion program that raised over N600 million from corporate organizations to pay fines for over 4,000 inmates, a move that saved the government an estimated N1 billion annually in feeding costs. Further decongestion efforts have been pursued through collaboration with the Ministry of Justice to facilitate speedy trials for awaiting-trial inmates. Renovation of correctional facilities has also commenced, with 10 facilities completed and eight currently undergoing refurbishment, including the Kuje Correctional Centre. A technical team has been constituted to conduct a comprehensive audit of correctional services.

The Federal Fire Service (FFS) has also witnessed significant improvements under his leadership, with 1,680 personnel promoted in 2023. Emergency response times have been reduced to below 15 minutes nationwide, and operational efficiency has been enhanced through the commissioning of 15 rapid response vehicles and six firefighting trucks. Plans are underway to expand the service’s scope through the passage of the Federal Fire and Rescue Service Bill. The National Fire Academy in Sheda is undergoing development to become a central training facility for both public and private sector fire personnel.

Within the Nigeria Immigration Service (NIS), over 4,598 personnel have been promoted, and a backlog of over 200,000 passport applications was cleared in just three weeks. The passport enrolment system has been redesigned into a seamless and automated platform, incorporating contactless biometric applications for Nigerians in Canada and Europe. The government has deployed an Advanced Passenger Information System (APIS) and installed e-Gates at all international airports in Lagos, Abuja, Port Harcourt, Enugu, and Kano to enhance border security and streamline entry procedures.Also on the 7th of February, 2025, the ministry launched a contactless passport renewal system for Nigerians living in Europe. The system allows eligible Nigerians in Europe to renew their passports online without visiting any physical office, following the successful rollout of the initiative in Canada

To further strengthen border surveillance, 30 new patrol vehicles have been commissioned, while a new Command and Control Centre, housing a 1.4 petabyte-capacity data center, has been constructed at the NIS headquarters in Abuja.[27] The Ministry has also activated the role of Document Verification Officers (DVOs) to authenticate passport applicants from their local government areas.[28]

Technological advancement has been a key focus, culminating in the commissioning of the Bola Ahmed Tinubu Technology Innovation Complex (BATTIC) on the 11th of December,2024. The facility houses the NIS Command and Control Center, ECOWAS Biometric Card Production Center, the Interior Data Center, the Visa Application Center, and a solar farm. Additionally, over N10 billion in debts owed to technical partners was cleared within his first six months in office.

Beyond policy execution, Tunji-Ojo has prioritized proactive governance. He responds promptly to emergencies, personally visiting incident sites and issuing public updates. Routine inspections of projects under the ministry ensure accountability, while strategic collaborations with other ministries and agencies, including the Ministry of Defence, the Office of the National Security Adviser (ONSA), and the Department of State Services (DSS), have strengthened national security. Technical partners have been invited to enhance the visa enrolment process and localize passport production. He has also mandated periodic briefings from service chiefs to swiftly address operational challenges.

== Personal life ==
He is married to Abimbola Tunji-Ojo who also hails from Ondo State and they have two children.

== Awards and recognition ==
- Honorary Doctorate Degree in Public Administration by Joseph Ayo Babalola University, Ikeji Arakeji, Osun State (2021).
- Award of Recommendation as a distinguished Lecturer at the 1st African and 2nd Nigeria Conference on Adolescent and Youth Health and Development Abuja, Nigeria (2021).
- Nigeria Union of Journalists (NUJ) Ondo State Council As most outstanding constituents-friendly Federal Lawmaker of the year (2021).
- Award Of Excellence by House of Representatives Press Corps in recognition of excellent performance as Dean of oversight (2021).
- Transparency and anti-corruption award in recognition of pragmatic disposition to issues of transparency, accountability, and anti-corruption by National Assembly New Media Forum (2021)
- Southwest First Alert Magazine Merit Award as the best Federal incumbent Honourable Member for remarkable contributions towards the growth and development of South-West region (2020)
- Fellow’s award, National Association of Proprietors of Private Schools (2021)
- Gold award of excellence on Community Development by Southwest Nigeria Excellence Awards (2019)
- Outstanding leadership award as one of the key actors of the new Niger Delta by the Niger Delta Student Union Government (2021)
- Leadership award of excellence by Not Too Young To Rule Initiative (2019)
- Africa Value Awards (AVA) as the Legislator of the Year for effective Representation/Community Development (2021)
- 30 most Influential young Nigerians award by National Youth Council of Nigeria (2019)
- Award as Pacesetter in Political Representation by Akoko North West Local Government Council, Okeagbe Akoko, Ondo State (2019)
- Award of commendation by BEMORE EMPOWERED INITITATIVE of Arabinrin Betty Anyanwu-Akeredolu, wife of the Governor of Ondo State (2021)
- Sir Ahmadu Bello Platinum Leadership Award of Excellence (2019)
- National Assembly Best Legislator of the year (2020, 2021)
- The Federal University of Technology, Akure (FUTA), Nigeria Award of Excellence (2021)
- Kwame Nkrumah Leadership Award as “Worthy Ambassador of African 2010 Youth” by All African Students Union (AASU)
- Excellence Award in Students Empowerment by The National Association of Nigerian Students (NANS) 2010
