= John Togo =

Nigerian militant (1970–2011)

John Togo (1970s – May 2011), also known as John Ipoko, was a militant leader and the founder of the Niger Delta Liberation Front (NDLF). Born circa 1970 in the Niger Delta region of Nigeria, Togo became known for his leadership in the fight against the Nigerian government and multinational oil corporations exploiting the resources of the region. He led a movement that aimed to secure greater control and autonomy for the Niger Delta people.

== Early life and rise to leadership ==
John Togo was born and raised in the oil-rich yet impoverished Niger Delta region, where oil exploration has led to both environmental degradation and economic disparities. Togo's early experiences with the exploitation of the region by the Nigerian government and oil companies fueled his decision to take up arms in defense of his people. In the mid-2000s, Togo formed the Niger Delta Liberation Force (NDLF), a militant group advocating for self-determination and an independent Niger Delta.

== Military activities and confrontations ==
Under Togo's command, the NDLF engaged in multiple armed confrontations with oil corporations, including Shell, Chevron, and ExxonMobil, backed by the Nigerian military. The group carried out sabotage operations targeting oil infrastructure, kidnapping foreign oil workers, and launching attacks against Nigerian military installations. Togo and the NDLF's activities were part of the larger insurgency in the Niger Delta, which saw numerous armed groups resisting corporate and state exploitation and fighting against the economic inequality and environmental damage caused by the oil industry.

== Death ==
John Togo's militant activities made him a key target for the Nigerian government. In May 2011, the Joint Task Force launched an operation against insurgent groups in the Niger Delta, where Togo was reportedly killed in an airstrike. The operation, however, also led to significant civilian casualties, as rights groups described the attack as indiscriminate, with many innocent civilians killed and homes destroyed in the process. Some sources suggest Togo's location was betrayed by local informants.
