= Odi, Bayelsa State =

Community in Bayelsa State, Nigeria

Coordinates: 5°10′35″N 6°17′51″E

Odi is a human settlement located in Kolokuma/Opokuma Local Government Area in Bayelsa State, Nigeria.

The settlement is predominantly occupied by the Ijaw-speaking tribe of Bayelsa. It is known for the famous Odi Massacre which happened between men of the Nigerian Army and armed militias in 1999. This led to the loss of lives and the destruction of the community under President Olusegun Obasanjo's administration.

Odi houses the Federal Government College Odi. It is also home to the Bioresources Development Centre.

In 2013, a Federal High Court in Port Harcourt ordered the Federal Government to pay N37.6 billion as compensation to the community in respect to the armed invasion by the soldiers.
