= Godwin Abbe =

Nigerian politician (1949–2024)

Major General Godwin Osagie Abbe
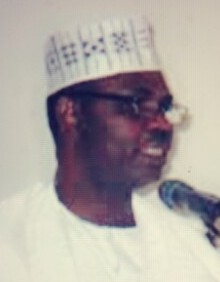

Governor of Akwa Ibom State
- In office 31 July 1988 – 5 September 1990
- Preceded by: Tunde Ogbeha
- Succeeded by: Idongesit Nkanga

(Nigeria) Military Governor of Rivers State
- In office August 1990 – January 1992
- Preceded by: Ernest Olawunmi Adelaye
- Succeeded by: Rufus Ada George

Minister of Interior
- In office 26 July 2007 – 14 July 2009
- Preceded by: Oluyemi Adeniji
- Succeeded by: Shettima Mustapha

Minister of Defence
- In office 14 July 2009 – 17 March 2010
- Preceded by: Shettima Mustapha
- Succeeded by: Adetokunbo Kayode

Personal details
- Born: 10 January 1949 Benin City, Colony and Protectorate of Nigeria
- Died: 21 December 2024 (aged 75)

Military service
- Allegiance: Nigeria
- Branch/service: Nigerian Army
- Years of service: 1967–1999
- Rank: Major General

Godwin Osagie Abbe (10 January 1949 – 21 December 2024) was a Nigerian Army Major General who served as minister of defence from 2009 to 2010. He also served as minister of interior from 2007 to 2009.

== Military career ==
Godwin Abbe joined the military in 1967 as a private, was commissioned second lieutenant in July 1968, and was promoted colonel in 1986. He served during the Nigerian Civil War. He earned a postgraduate diploma in International Relations from Obafemi Awolowo University (OAU), Ile-Ife.

He was also a graduate of the United States Army Infantry School Fort Benning, Georgia, Ghana Armed Forces Staff College and the National Institute for Policy and Strategic studies, Kuru.

He was military governor of Akwa Ibom State 1988–1990) and Rivers State (1990–1991).

Abbe then became general officer commanding (GOC) 2 Division Nigerian Army; Commander, Training and Doctrine Command (TRADOC) and Commander, National War College. He retired in 1999 with the rank of major general.

== Politician ==
After leaving the army, Godwin Abbe joined People's Democratic Party in 1999, and became chairman of the party in Edo State.

=== Minister of Interior ===
President Umaru Yar'Adua appointed Godwin Abbe as the minister of interior on 26 July 2007. At a meeting of Commonwealth Heads of Government in Kampala, Uganda, in November 2007, Abbe met British Prime Minister Gordon Brown and asked for assistance in restructuring the police force, which was suffering from low morale due to poor welfare, inadequate training and lack of vital work tools.

As minister of the interior, Godwin Abbe was chairman of a committee that recommended an amnesty programme for gunmen in the Niger Delta, an important step towards improving output of oil and gas.

Soon after, he was appointed minister of defence, a key role in implementing the amnesty.

=== Minister of Defence ===
In September 2009, Abbe said that the amnesty would not prevent security operatives from going after illegal oil bunkerers, who he said would be treated as enemies of the state.

In October 2009, speaking of Niger Delta militants who had accepted the government amnesty, Abbe gave assurances they would be rehabilitated, re-integrated and helped in every way possible to make them self-sustaining in life.

== Death ==
Abbe died on 21 December 2024, at the age of 75.
