= Odi massacre =

1999 massacre of the Odi people in Ijaw, Nigeria

- Part of the Conflict in the Niger Delta
- Date: 20 November 1999
- Location: Odi, Kolokuma/Opokuma, Bayelsa State, Nigeria; 5°10′45″N 6°18′0″E
- Type: Massacre
- Cause: Retaliation for the murder of twelve Nigerian police officers near Odi
- Target: Ijaw residents and town infrastructure of Odi
- Perpetrator: Nigerian Armed Forces
- Deaths: 43 (government claim, including 8 soldiers); 900+ (community estimate); Nearly 2,500 (Environmental Rights Action estimate)
- Property damage: Nearly all buildings in Odi destroyed (except a bank, an Anglican church, and a health centre)
- Litigation: Federal High Court ordered ₦37.6 billion in compensation (February 2013); settled out of court for ₦15 billion (2014)

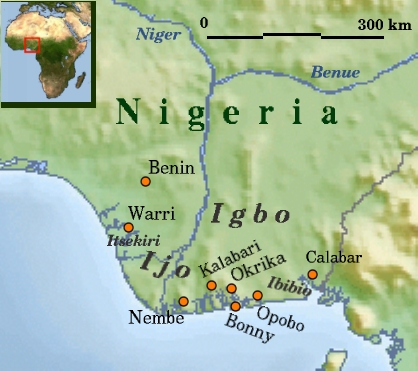
Location of Ijaw

The Odi massacre was an attack carried out on 20 November 1999, by the Nigerian Armed Forces against the predominantly Ijaw town of Odi in Bayelsa State. The attack came in the context of an ongoing conflict in the Niger Delta over indigenous rights to oil resources and environmental protection. It is estimated that over 900 civilians were killed in the attack.

People generally say that the massacre was ordered by the regime of former president Olusegun Obasanjo and vice president Atiku Abubakar. The military has often defended its action saying it was ambushed on its way to Odi. As a result, tensions rose before entrance into the village.

== Massacre ==
Before the massacre, twelve members of the Nigerian police were murdered by a gang near Odi, seven on 4 November and the remainder in the following days. In retaliation, the military decided to invade the village. There are reports that the army was ambushed close to the village thus tensions soared; they broke through the ambush and exchanged fire with armed militias in the village who were believed to be using the civilian population as cover. This and the "ambush" provocation led to the attack on the civilian population and the town's buildings. Every building in the town except the bank, the Anglican church and the health centre was burnt to the ground. All of this happened in president Olusegun Obasanjo's presidency.

== Death toll ==
A wide range of estimates has been given for the numbers of civilians killed. Human Rights Watch concluded that "the soldiers must certainly have killed tens of unarmed civilians and that figures of several hundred dead are entirely possible." Nnimmo Bassey, executive director of Environmental Rights Action, claims that nearly 2,500 civilians were killed. The government initially put the death toll at 43, including eight soldiers.

== Court case ==
In February 2013, the Federal High Court ordered the Federal Government to pay N37.6 billion compensation to the people of Odi community in kolokuma/Opokuma Local Government Area of Bayelsa state. Justice ordered that the compensation should be paid within three weeks.

In his judgment, Justice Lambi Akanbi of the Federal High Court, condemned the government for a "brazen violation of the fundamental human rights of the victims to movement, life and to own property and live peacefully in their ancestral home."

The case led to the payment of N15 billion from the Goodluck Jonathan-led administration as an out-of-court settlement. According to Prof. Kobina Imananagha (Chairman of the Odi Destruction Case Prosecution Committee (ODCPC)), “The London court issued threats that it was going to enforce the full judgement of the court (payment of N37.6billion) if by October 21, 2014, government fails to negotiate settlement and pay agreed compensation to Odi. This seeming that compelled the Federal Ministry of Justice and the leadership of the legal team, ODCPC and the king of Odi to the negotiation table on May 26, 2014 where N15billion (as the only payment) offer as compensation to Odi was made by the Federal Government."

The government later paid the sum of N15 billion which led to further conflict in the community and the subsequent kidnap of the committee Chairman Prof. Zibokere who was later released.

== References in popular culture ==
The Odi massacre inspired a song titled "Dem Mama" on Timaya's True Story album.

It also inspired the poem "Potpourri of Perdition" by Success Akpojotor, published on Poets Reading The News.

The massacre further inspired the poem "Did Odi do the Deed?", written by Ibiwari Ikiriko.

== See also ==
- List of massacres in Nigeria
