= Henry Okah =

Nigerian guerrilla fighter

- Born: 1965 (age 60–61); Lagos State, Nigeria
- Movement: Movement for the Emancipation of the Niger Delta
- Status: Imprisoned at Ebongweni Correctional Centre
- Criminal charges: Terrorism, treason, illegal possession of firearms, arms trafficking
- Penalty: 24 years

Henry Okah (born 1965, Lagos State, Nigeria) is the presumed Nigerian guerrilla leader of the Movement for the Emancipation of the Niger Delta (MEND), which he denies.

== Overview ==
MEND has claimed responsibility for attacks on oil companies operating in the Niger Delta, often through the use of sabotage, guerilla warfare or kidnapping of foreign oil workers. The rebels' goal is to destabilize the foreign oil interest in the Niger Delta, who the rebels claim to be exploiting the local populace. MEND announced its founding in early 2006 with several attacks on Nigeria's oil infrastructure that have cut daily production by about one quarter, as well as a sophisticated media campaign involving e-mailing press releases to coincide with the attacks. MEND created headlines in Nigeria when it announced it would participate in peace talks, if they were mediated by former United States President Jimmy Carter or actor George Clooney. It also claimed the organization was considering a cease-fire after receiving an "appeal" by U.S. President Barack Obama, who denied making an appeal in the first place.

Okah was arrested in Angola and deported to Nigeria in February 2008, and charged with 62 counts of treason, terrorism, illegal possession of firearms and arms trafficking, with the prosecution seeking the death penalty. He claimed to be "championing the disenfranchised residents of the Delta region, who see little benefit from the oil being pumped out from under them." Okah's lawyer, Femi Falana, claimed that the Nigerian government offered to buy him off, by granting ownership of several oil blocks, though he refused. The trial, which began in April 2008, was held in private, because President Umaru Yar'Adua said it would "jeopardize national security". Lawyers for Okah said a closed trial was an infringement of his rights and asked a superior court to overturn the decision.

In response, on May 26, 2008, MEND attacked a Royal Dutch Shell pipeline in the Delta region, and claimed to have killed 11 Nigerian troops. While the Nigerian government denied the deaths, the price of oil rose $1 on world markets within hours of the attack. An e-mail from MEND warned "[their] attacks... are a retaliation to his unnecessary arrest."

In July 2009, Okah's lawyer announced that he accepted an amnesty, which had been offered by the Nigerian government to any rebel willing to lay down their arms, in a bid to end attacks on the oil industry. Senior MEND official "General" Boyloaf claimed that, if Okah was set free, the organization would indeed lay down its arms. Jomo Gbomo, a spokesman of the organization, supported Okah's decision, since his health was failing. However, other MEND leaders said that they would reject the amnesty. On July 13, 2009, Judge Mohammed Liman announced that Okah was released, telling him in person: "Having reviewed what the attorney general said, you have become a free man at this moment."

Okah was again arrested in Johannesburg on Saturday, October 2, following the 2010 Nigeria's Independence Day attacks that killed 12 people. He "claims that he knows nothing of any of these bombings."

On Monday, January 21, 2013, a South African court convicted Okah of 13 charges of terrorism, including bombings that killed 12 people in Abuja on October 1, 2010. Handing down the verdict, Judge Nels Claassen said, "I have come to the conclusion that the state proved beyond reasonable doubt the guilt of the accused." Okah was sentenced to 24 years imprisonment and is currently serving this sentence at the Ebongweni Correctional Centre in Kokstad, South Africa. Throughout the trial he maintained his innocence, saying the trial was a result of his denial of support for Nigeria's President Goodluck Jonathan's statements and accusations that the October 1st Independence Day attacks were executed by leaders from Northern Nigeria.

Following a court trial on March 7, 2018, Charles Okah, his brother, was found guilty of masterminding the independence day attack and was handed a life sentence.
