= Izon language =

Ijaw language spoken in Nigeria

Izon
- Ịzọn
- Native to: Nigeria
- Region: Rivers State, Bayelsa, Delta, Ondo and Edo States
- Ethnicity: Ijaw
- Native speakers: 5 million (2024)
- Language family: Niger–Congo?: Ijoid; Ijaw; West–Central; Izon
- Writing system: Latin

Language codes
- ISO 639-3: ijc
- Glottolog: izon1238
- ELP: Izon

Izon (Ịzọn), also known as Central Izon language, Ijaw, Izon and Uzo, is the dominant Ijaw language, spoken by a majority of the Ijaw people of Nigeria.

There are about thirty dialects, all mutually intelligible, of which there are Gbanran, Ekpetiama and Kolokuma etc. Kolokuma is the language of education.

In June 2013, the Izon Fie instructional book and audio CDs were launched at a ceremony attended by officials of the government of Bayelsa State. The government of Bayelsa State official employed 30 teachers to teach the Central Izon language in primary schools in the state in order to save the language from extinction.

== General information and history ==
While there are approximately 1.7 million speakers of all Ijo languages in Nigeria, it is believed that there are only a little over 1 million Izon speakers. The language is currently classified as "at risk", with a 20% certainty based on the evidence available. Izon is recognized as having been present in the region several millennia before the 15th century when the Portuguese arrived at the Nigerian coast. At present, linguists approximate that the language became established in the Niger Delta region as many as seven to eight thousand years ago.

The Ijo people did not call the Niger Delta region home for all of history; in fact, it is known that there have been ancient movements from far-away places/from the edges of the Niger Delta. Because of this, Izon is closely related to a variety of other languages from surrounding areas, beyond the confines of Nigeria towards the sources of the Niger River near West Africa. Linguists have traced the pre-history of Izon far back and collectively refer to its roots as proto-ijo, the language from which all existing Ijo dialects came into existence.

== Dialects ==
An Izon dialect classification from Blench (2019) is given as:

Ịzọn

- West: Arogbo, Fụrụpagha, W. Olodiama, Egbema, Gbaramatu, Ogulagha, Iduwini
- Central
  - North
    - Northeast: Gbanraịn, Kolokuma, Ekpetiama
    - Northwest: Ikibiri, Ogboin, W. Tarakiri, Kabo, Kumbo, Mein, Tuomọ, Sembiri, Operemọ, Ọbọtẹbẹ, Ogbe Ịjọ
  - South
    - Southwest: Apọị, Koluama, Basan, E. Olodiama
    - Southeast: Oiyakiri, Oporomọ, Ḅụmọ

== Preservation efforts ==
In recent efforts to prevent the Izon language from extinction, the Bayelsa State Government has taken great preservation measures. They have employed over thirty teachers to teach the Izon language in local schools within the state. The Commissioner for Culture and Ijaw National Affairs, Dr. Felix Tuodolo fears that because families are now teaching their children Pidgin-English, as opposed to Izon, that the language is now at critical risk for extinction. As a means of furthering the government's dedication to preserving the cultural language, a number of books have been written in Izon dialects to assist in this process.

== Phonology ==
=== Consonants ===
| | | Labial | Alveolar | Palatal | Velar | Labio- velar |
|---|---|---|---|---|---|---|
| Plosive | voiceless | p | t | | k | k͡p |
| Plosive | voiced | b | d | | ɡ | ɡ͡b |
| Fricative | voiceless | f | s | | | |
| Fricative | voiced | v | z | | (ɣ) | |
| Nasal | | m | n | | ŋ | |
| Lateral | | | l | | | |
| Tap | | | ɾ | | | |
| Approximant | | | | j | | w |

- A voiced velar fricative [ɣ] occurs as an extra phoneme among speakers of different dialects. However, it does not exist in most dialects.
- A glottal [h] is only existent in interjections, not as a phoneme.
- /s, z/ are in free variation with postalveolar sounds [ʃ, d͡ʒ] in loanwords borrowed from English.

=== Vowels ===
| | Front | Central | Back |
|---|---|---|---|
| Close | i | | u |
| Near-close | ɪ | | ʊ |
| Close-mid | e | | o |
| Open-mid | ɛ | | ɔ |
| Open | | a | |

== Syntax ==
- The Izon language does not make singular-plural distinctions in verbs, as opposed to what is done in English. Therefore, regardless of whether or not the subject is singular or plural, the same form of the verb is used. Such a system is evident in the following examples:

| Izon sample sentence | English translation |
|---|---|
| Kiri ma se ke u sei mini ye. | He dances at all times. |
| Kiri ma se ke a sei mini ye. | She dances at all times. |
| Kiri ma se ke wo sei mini ye. | We dance at all times. |
| Kiri ma se ke oni sei mini ye. | They dance at all times. |

In each of the four Izon sentences above, the same form of the verb "sei" (dance) is used, even when the plurality of the subject changes.

- Another interesting aspect of Izon Syntax is its Demonstrative Agreement. A variety of demonstratives are used in Izon to indicate the gender of the nouns that coincide with them. The demonstratives "bei" (this) and "u bei" (that) are used with singular-masculine nouns, for instance:

bei ki.mi. bei (this man) bei owu bei (this masquerade)
u bei ki.mi. bei (that man) u bei owu bei (that masquerade)

The demonstrative "ma" (this) and "u ma" (that) coincide with singular feminine nouns as follows:

ma iyo. ro. arau. ma (this woman) u ma iyo. ro. arau. ma (that woman)
ma ere ma (this wife) u ma ere ma (that wife)

In addition, "mi" (this) and "u mi" (that) are used with singular neuter nouns, for example:

mi ololo mi (this bottle) u mi ololo mi (that bottle)
mi bira mi (this hand) u mi bira mi (that hand)

When there is a plural noun present, the demonstrative "ma" (these) and "u ma" (those) are used, regardless of the gender of the noun. This can be seen in the following:

ma ere abu ma (these wives) u ma ere abu ma (those wives)
ma azuru ma (these rooms) u ma azuru ma (those rooms)
ma akimi ma (these men) u ma akimi ma (those men)

== Additional linguistic information ==
Izon can be considered distinct from many other related languages in the region, in the sense that it follows a SOV (subject-object-verb) format, both in simple and complex sentences. Additionally, directional and locative phrases also precede the main verb. Tense marking takes the form of a suffix on the final verb. Location markers and other preposition-like articles are suffixed to the nouns that they relate to. Possessor typically precedes possessed and adjectives precede the nouns they modify.

== Sample vocabulary list ==
| Izon Word | English Translation |
|---|---|
| abadị́ | ocean; sea |
| agbaị-áràụ | girlfriend; (female) lover |
| báka | to be confused; confounded |
| dụlụkpụụ́ | dirty (clothes, people) |
| fịkịmí | dead person; corpse |
| gbísì | cat |
| ingbekeé | unusually big |
| ịngịọrịị́ | to rejoice (in a festive mood) |
| kọrọngbọọ́ | thin; amaciated |
| músu | to become moist; be damp |
| peuu | describes a well-roofed house |

== See also ==
- Eastern Apoi tribe and Western Apoi tribe
- Arogbo tribe
- Bassan tribe
- Boma tribe
- Egbema tribe
- Ekpetiama tribe
- Furupagha tribe
- Gbaran tribe
- Iduwini tribe
- Kabo tribe
- Kolokuma tribe
- Kumbo tribe
- Mein tribe
- Ogbe tribe

== Bibliography ==
- Agheyisi, R. N. (1984). "Minor languages in the Nigerian context: Prospects and Problems". Word. 35 (3): 235–253. doi:10.1080/00437956.1984.11435759.
- Okunrinmeta, U. (2011). "Izon Syntax and the English of Izon-English Bilinguals". World Englishes. 30 (2): 211–228. doi:10.1111/j.1467-971X.2011.01699.x.
- Okunrinmeta, U. (2013). "Singular-Plural Distinction in Izon and Its Influence on the Teaching/Learning of Plural Formation in English". Journal of Education and Learning. 2 (2): 126–138. doi:10.5539/jel.v2n2p126.
- Smith, N. S.; Robertson, I. E.; Williamson, K. (1987). "The Ịjọ Element in Berbice Dutch". Language in Society. 16 (1): 49–89. doi:10.1017/S0047404500012124.
- Williamson, Kay (1969) [1965]. A grammar of the Kolokuma dialect of Ịjọ (2nd ed.). Cambridge University Press. ISBN 9780521073622.
- Williamson, Kay (1975). "Metre in Ịzọn funeral dirges". Ọ̀dụ̀má. 2 (2): 21–33.
- Williamson, Kay (1991). "The tense system of Ịzọn". In Essien, Okon E. (ed.). The tense systems of Nigerian languages and English. Afrikanistische Arbeitspapiere. Vol. 27. pp. 145–167.
- Williamson, Kay (2004). "The language situation in the Niger Delta". In Akpana, Martha L. (ed.). The development of Ịzọn language. pp. 9–13.
- Williamson, Kay; Timitimi, A. O., eds. (1983). Short Ịzọn–English dictionary. Delta Series. Vol. 3. Port Harcourt: University of Port Harcourt Press. ISBN 9789782321091.
