= Ogbe (disambiguation) =

Ogbe is a village in Nigeria. Ogbe may also refer to:

- Ogbe ijaw, a town in Nigeria
- Ogbe tribe of the Ijaw people in Nigeria
- Utagba-Ogbe (Kwale), former settlement in Nigeria
- Ogbe (name)
