= Kolokuma tribe =

Tribe of the Ijaw people in Bayelsa state, Nigeria

The Kolokuma tribe of the Ijaw people live along the Nun River in Bayelsa State, Southern Nigeria. Kolokuma settlements include: Seibokorogha (Sabagreia), Odi, Okoloba, Igbedi and Kaiama. The geographic position of the Kolokuma clan caused them to interact with neighboring peoples including the Mein, Western Tarakiri, Isoko, and Ndokwa Igbo. Also, wars were fought between the Kolokuma and the Boma and Oyakiri tribes in the distant past. Egbesu is the tribal god of the Kolokuma. Historically, the tribe came under the central authority of the high priest of Egbesu. The Kolokuma people speak the Izon language. They are predominantly farmers and fishermen. The freedom just fighter Major Adaka Boro was from the Kolokuma tribe.
