= Oil theft in Nigeria =

Oil theft in Nigeria is considered to be the illegal appropriation of crude or refined oil products from the pipelines of multinational oil companies. Oil theft in Nigeria is facilitated by the pragmatic co-operation between security forces, militia organizations, the local population, and oil company employees who use a variety of methods to steal oil from the multinational oil corporations that are stationed within the country. Currently, Exxon Mobil, Chevron, Equinor, Shell, and Agip are the five largest multinational oil companies present in Nigeria. Due to the lack of federal oversight and a large network of corruption, oil theft operations are primarily cellular rather than hierarchical and requires frequent collaboration between a variety of random players depending on the level of oil theft being committed. Each group maintains a specific role in the oil theft trade in Nigeria. These key players use methods such as hot-tapping and cold-tapping to perform oil bunkering and steal thousands of barrels of oil per day from established oil pipelines. In addition to stealing oil from the pipelines, oil theft can also occur during the transportation of the crude oil product to the oil shipping terminals for export.

Muhammadu Buhari's administration’s attempt to reduce corruption within the government through the targeting of suspected facilitators of oil theft has led to an increase in violence within the country. For example, the creation of the Niger Delta Avengers militant organization occurred after Buhari prosecuted the leader of a local militia group, Government Ekpemupolo, for his role in the practice of oil theft in the Niger Delta region. Consequently, Ekpemupolo and the Niger Delta Avengers have proceeded to sabotage multinational oil corporation pipelines. In addition to the violence associated with the Niger Delta Avengers, oil spilled from these sabotage operations and the illegal refinery practices committed by the local population have led to the severe pollution of the environment. Given that almost 83 percent of total exports revenue come from the petroleum products revenue in Nigeria, the political and military elite have sought ways to consolidate their control of the oil trade. This monopoly over the oil trade has prompted many local villagers to commit small-scale oil theft and to pursue the illegal refinery of stolen crude oil as means of entering into this unofficial economy.

== Definition ==
In terms of an orthodox definition and in the context of Nigeria, "oil theft" is constituted as the illegal appropriation of refined oil or crude oil from the various multinational oil companies that are positioned in the country through the process of oil bunkering. This includes the theft, diversion, and smuggling of petroleum products. Refined oil products refer to crude oil that has been refined through a variety of treatment processes to become ready to burn energy. Although estimates of how much oil is stolen per day in Nigeria vary, the British think tank Chatham House reports that over 100,000 barrels of oil were estimated to be stolen per day. According to OPEC, Nigeria is estimated to produce over one and a half million barrels of oil per day.

== Methods of oil theft ==
Hot-tapping and cold-tapping are extremely sophisticated methods of oil theft and are primarily used in large-scale operations during the crude oil stage. Terminal and vehicle transportation theft involves the re-appropriation of both crude and refined oil products from storage facilities during the process of export transportation.

=== Hot-tapping ===
During the process of hot-tapping, an illegal secondary pipeline belonging to oil theft criminals is attached to a high-pressure primary pipeline belonging to a multinational corporation. After this breach is successful, oil is diverted from the primary pipeline into mobile oil bunkering facilities that are attached to the secondary pipeline. By gradually withdrawing small amounts of oil, the primary pipeline is able to function at an almost normal pressure and can remain undetected by oil corporation officials. Although a gradual amount must be withdrawn, the pressure within a pipeline is substantial enough for a transport barge to be filled with thousands of metric tons of oil within a few hours. Hot-tapping is considered to be extremely dangerous and complex.

=== Cold-tapping ===
In the process of cold-tapping, a portion of a pipeline is blown up and a secondary pipeline is attached to the shut-down primary pipeline. After the primary pipeline is repaired, the existence of the secondary pipeline's access to the oil flow is unknown since the overall pipeline pressure will not fluctuate. Cold-tapping is considered to be less dangerous.

=== Terminal and vehicle transportation theft ===
Although oil theft is common during the initial stages of the oil production process, theft is rampant at the port terminals where crude and refined oil products await shipment to international locations and during the transportation of oil products from corporate facilities. In export terminal theft, administrative collusion and security force corruption facilitate the siphoning of oil shipment reserves into criminal fuel trucks. In turn, these fuel trucks are used to transport illegal oil products for sale in neighboring African countries where the price for oil is substantially higher than the subsidized rates in Nigeria. Since oil corporations do not have oil meters at the source of production and since they are only present at export facilities, there is a lack of oversight into managing the initial value of oil that was produced by the multinational oil corporations.

== Participants ==
Oil theft in Nigeria requires the effective collaboration between a variety of participants and the maintenance of their individual functions which are essential to committing theft. This collaboration and interaction is entirely situational and takes on a certain complexity depending on the level of oil theft that is being committed. In most instances of large-scale and illegal oil bunkering, corrupt resident oil authority officials allow for the successful tapping of oil pipelines. Subsequently, the Nigerian security forces or militant organizations offer guided escorts for the transportation of stolen refined or crude oil products. These products are eventually sold to neighboring African countries where the price of oil is much higher or to other international bidders. With regards to the general population, most Nigerian citizens in the Niger Delta who are participants in the oil theft trade assist in the illegal refinery of stolen crude oil products and sell them at black markets in local villages.

=== Military and security forces ===
Since the presidency of Ibrahim Babangida from 1986 to 1993 and his appointment of officials to supervise the oil producing sectors, the Nigerian military has maintained extensive control over the crude oil trade. The military personnel and Joint-Task Force members that are involved in the illegal oil trade primarily serve as armed escorts for the stolen petroleum products during large-scale operations and gather the intelligence that is necessary for avoiding government probes in the region.

In addition to providing security for the illegal trade, the Nigerian navy is frequently active in seizing transportation vessels that are suspected of containing stolen petroleum products. However, in these operations, Nigerian security forces have often been accused of facilitating the disappearance of captured vessels and the reappropriated sale of seized products to foreign markets. Similarly to facilitating the oil theft trade, Nigerian military officials often pursue oil bunkering allegations against fellow servicemen as means of absorbing sectors of the oil trade and strengthening individual positions in the region. For example, in 2007, then Chief of Naval Staff Ganiyu Adekeye reported that a large group of retired military personnel were suspected of facilitating the disappearance of captured vessels. Although there is credible evidence for a variety of participants in the illegal oil trade in Nigeria, the Nigerian government's lack of prosecution before Buhari's administration suggests that corruption is extensive and high-reaching.

=== Militant organizations ===
According to former Nigerian president Olusegun Obasanjo, militant organizations have often been used by “political godfathers” in the oil sector regions to cause disturbances in regional stability. Consequently, these disturbances give the political elite the opportunity to implement methods of oil theft under more loose supervision by the government. Given that over 50 percent of Nigeria’s total population is designated as impoverished by the World Bank, the incentives for joining local gangs and militant organizations that work under these political elite are credible. These groups primarily serve as armed escorts for the property of the political elite or function as the sabotage mechanism that is necessary for cold-tapping operations.

A prime example of militant organizations and their role in political violence is the contemporary existence of the Niger Delta Avengers. Currently, the Buhari administration has pursued anti-corruption policies and has undertaken a variety of probings of Nigeria’s political elite for their involvement in the oil theft trade. However, Buhari’s attempts to remove corruption from the government has caused backlash from the variety of political elite that he has pursued with criminal prosecution. Previous to the Buhari administration’s incumbency, former Nigerian president Goodluck Jonathan awarded a maritime security contract to Government Ekpomupolo and his militant security firm. Ekpomupolo and his militant organization were considered to be extremely corrupt and were designated as the primary facilitators of the oil theft trade in the Niger Delta region. However, after the Buhari administration took power in 2015, Buhari voided the maritime contract and indicted Ekpomupolo on forty counts of fraud. Ekpomupolo went into hiding and the Niger Delta Avengers began to initiate a series of sabotage campaigns against the Chevron oil structures with the Niger Delta region in 2016. Due to the large success of the Niger Delta Avengers operations, Nigeria’s annual output of crude oil decreased from its potential capacity of 2.2 million barrels per day to 1.4 million barrels per day. As a consequence of the high influx of oil pipeline sabotage in the Niger Delta, oil spills have “devastated mangroves, contaminated soil and groundwater, destroyed the fish habitat, and posed a serious threat to public health.”

=== Resident oil company authorities ===
The complexities and dangers involved with oil theft methods such as hot-tapping and cold-tapping provide that expert knowledge is necessary for successfully implementing these measures. Consequently, resident oil company authorities from the multinational oil corporations stationed in the oil sector regions of Nigeria hold an influential role in facilitating oil theft at the crude oil stage. In addition to providing technical expertise and managing oil withdrawal operations, oil experts offer inside knowledge on the schedule of corporate inspection operations on the pipelines. This is critical for ensuring that illegal secondary pipelines stay intact and that the location of fueling operations are not revealed to Nigerian security forces and multinational corporate authorities.

=== Local population ===
The general population that surrounds the variety of oil pipelines throughout Nigeria often facilitates the local creation and sale of illegally refined oil products as means of alleviating their impoverished condition. Although it is common in the Nigerian population to use small-scale oil tapping to obtain a collection of crude oil reserves, their lack of technical expertise and the refinement of acquired crude oil reserves in rudimentary bush refineries have contributed significantly to the development of pollution in Nigeria. In addition to oil pipeline leakages from small-scale tapping, the JTF's anti-refinery and illegal oil market operations have led to the uncontrolled destruction of illegal crude oil reserves. Given the simple construction of bush refineries and their placement in isolated locations, all efforts by the JTF to mitigate the illegal refinement of oil products have largely been futile.

In September 2018, the unemployment rate in Nigeria had reached up to 23%. Consequently, in tandem with the high unemployment rate, the pollution of waterways and the contamination of local fish populations have forced many young Nigerians to partake in oil theft and illegal refinery activities.

== Future ==
Although there is considerable acknowledgement of the extensive involvement of a wide group of participants in the Nigerian oil theft trade, the network of protection that the Nigerian political elite and security forces provide to lower-level participants perpetuates the existence of the trade. In addition, the profitability of crude oil products and the lack of government oversight in the supervision of the vast oil pipeline fields serve as incentives for Nigerian officials and members of the local population to partake in the sale of stolen petroleum products. Similarly, the lack of social welfare in Nigeria, the high poverty rate, and poor governance are elements that foster a positive environment for oil theft operations. Given the development of the Niger Delta Avengers and Buhari's failure to remove corruption from the Nigerian government, large-scale political corruption serves as the protective mechanism that allows efforts in oil theft to persist.
