= Ijaw people =

Nigerian ethnic group

Coordinates: 5°21′00″N 5°30′30″E

Ijaw
Izon
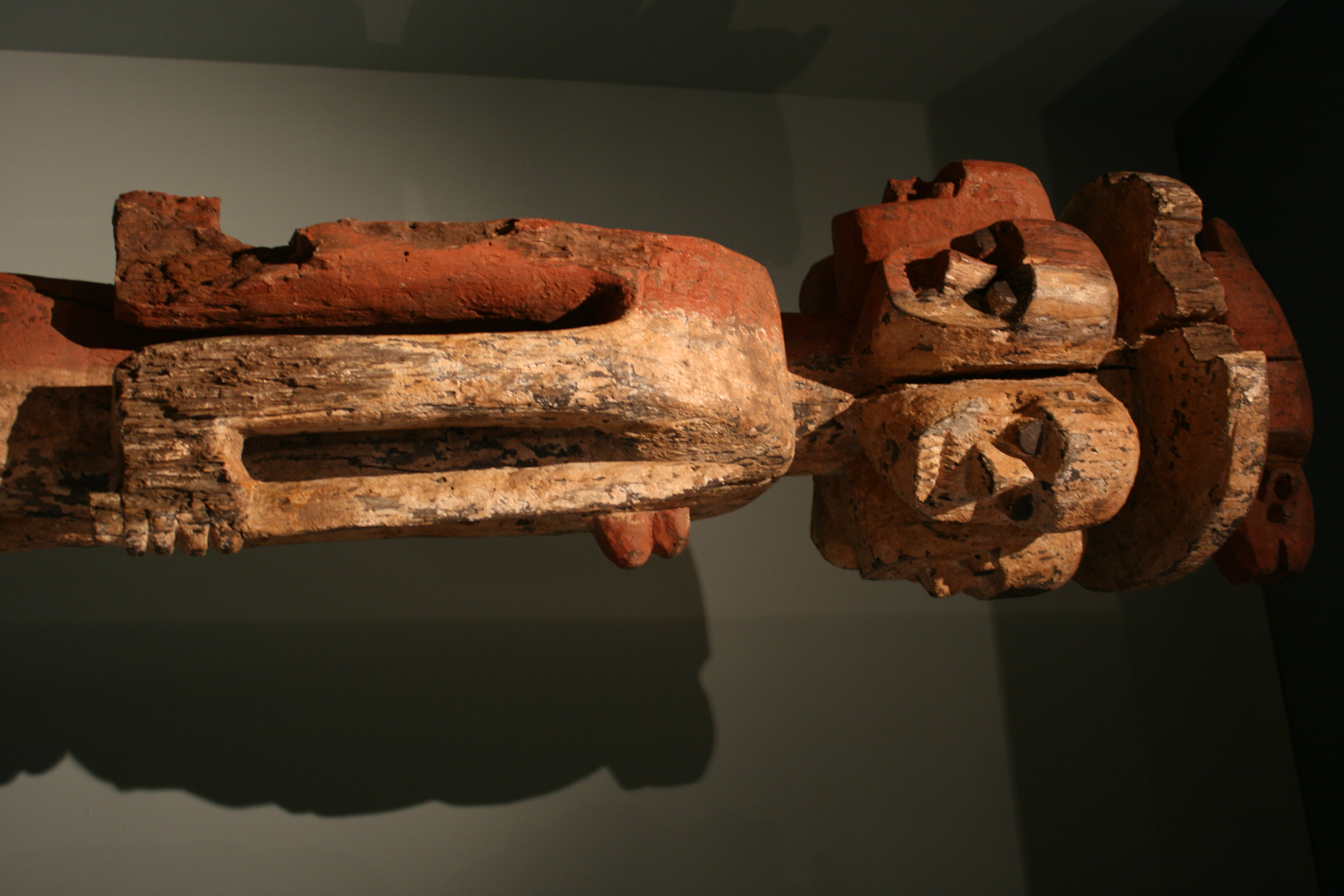
- Izon statue depicting "the many faces of your enemies"

Total population
- 14 million

Regions with significant populations
- Niger Delta

Languages
- Izon languages (Kalabari, kumbo, Kolokuma Obolo, Wakirike, Nkoroo, Ogbian, Kabou, Buseni, Atala, Bille, Kula, Apoi, etc.)

Religion
- Christianity 65% Islam 1% Traditional 34%

Related ethnic groups
- Itsekiri, Ekpeye, Oron, Ogoni, Isoko, Igbo, Eleme.

The Izon people or Izon Otu, otherwise known as the Ijaw people due to the historic mispronunciation of the name Izon, are an ethnic group majorly found in the Niger Delta in Nigeria, with significant population clusters in Bayelsa, in Delta, and in Rivers. They are also found in other Nigerian states like Ondo State, Edo State, Akwa Ibom State, Abia State, and Ogun State Many are found as migrant fishermen in camps as far west as Sierra Leone and as far east as Gabon. Population figures for the Ijaws are placed at about 14 million spreading across 6 states.

They have long lived in locations near many sea trade routes, and they were well connected to other areas by trade as early as the 15th century.

== Language ==
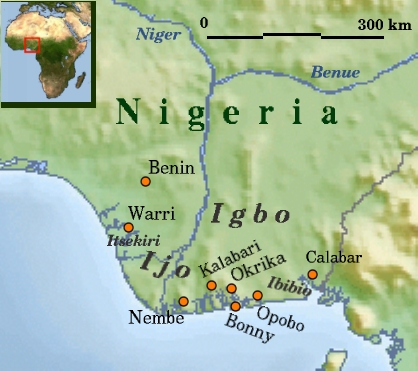
Map showing Ijaw (Ijo) area in Nigeria

The Ijaws speak nine closely related Niger-Congo languages, all of which belong to the Ijoid branch of the Niger-Congo tree. The primary division between the Ijo languages is that between Eastern Ijo and Western Ijo, the most important of the former group of languages being Izon, which is spoken by about five million people. While these languages are classified as Ijaw language clusters, they are not mutually intelligible causing Ijaws to use English or Pidgin language in pan-Ijaw gatherings.

There are two prominent groupings of the Ijaw language. The first, termed either Western or Central Izon (Ijaw) consists of Western Ijaw speakers: Tuomo Clan, Egbema, Ekeremor, Sagbama (Mein), Bassan, Apoi, Arogbo, Boma (Bumo), Kabo (Kabuowei), Ogboin, Tarakiri, and Kolokuma-Opokuma. Nembe, Brass and Akassa (Akaha) dialects represent Southeast Ijo (Izon). Buseni and Okordia dialects are considered Inland Ijo.

It was discovered in the 1980s that a now extinct Berbice Creole Dutch, spoken in Guyana, is partly based on Ijo lexicon and grammar. Its nearest relative seems to be Eastern Ijo, most likely Kalabari.

== Clans ==
Name	State	Alternate Names
Akassa	Bayelsa	Akaha, Akasa
Andoni	Rivers	
Apoi (Eastern)	Bayelsa	
Apoi (Western)	Ondo	
Arogbo	Ondo	
Bassan	Bayelsa	Basan
Bille	Rivers	Bile, Bili
Bumo	Bayelsa	Boma, Bomo
Buseni	Bayelsa	Biseni
Egbema	Delta	
Operemor	Delta/Bayelsa	Operemor, Ekeremo,Ojobo
Ekpetiama	Bayelsa	
Gbaramatu	Delta	Gbaramatu
Gbaran	Bayelsa	Gbarain
Iduwini	Bayelsa/Delta	
Isaba	Delta	
Kabo	Delta	Kabowei, Kabou
Kalabari	Rivers	
Ke	Rivers	Obiansoama, Kenan City
Kolokuma	Bayelsa	
Kou	Bayelsa	
Kula	Rivers	
Kumbo	Delta	Kumbowei
Mein	Delta/Bayelsa	
Obotebe	Delta	
Odimodi	Delta	
Ogbe	Delta	Ogbe-Ijoh
Ogboin	Bayelsa	
Ogulagha	Delta	Ogula,Small London
Okrika	Rivers	Wakirike
Okordia	Bayelsa	Okodia, Akita
Olodiama (East)	Bayelsa	
Opokuma	Bayelsa	
Oporoma	Bayelsa	Oporomo
Oruma	Bayelsa	Tugbene
Oyakiri	Bayelsa	Beni
Seimbiri	Delta	
Tarakiri (East)	Bayelsa	
Tarakiri (West)	Delta	
Tungbo	Bayelsa	
Tuomo	Delta / Bayelsa	T.T Clan
Zarama	Bayelsa	
Unyeada	Rivers	Unyeada

== Traditional occupations ==
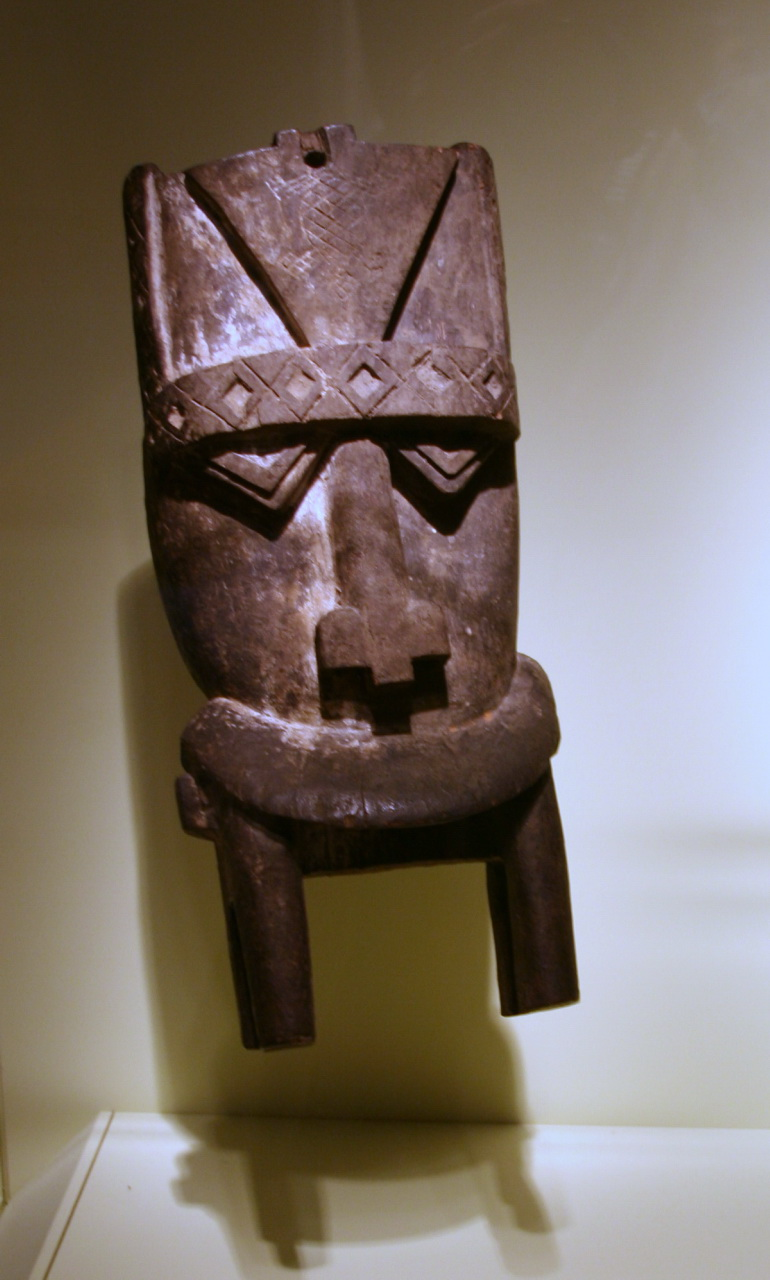
An Ijaw mask

The Ijaws were one of the first of Nigeria's peoples to have contact with Westerners, and were active as go-betweens in the trade between visiting Europeans and the peoples of the interior, particularly in the era before the discovery of quinine, when West Africa was still known as the "White Man's Graveyard" because of the endemic presence of malaria. Some of the kin-based trading lineages that arose among the Ijaws developed into substantial corporations which were known as "houses"; each house had an elected leader as well as a fleet of war canoes for use in protecting trade and fighting rivals. The other main occupation common among the Ijaws, has traditionally been fishing and farming.

Being a maritime people, many Ijaws were employed in the merchant shipping sector in the early and mid-20th century (pre-Nigerian independence). With the advent of oil and gas exploration in their territory, some are employed in that sector. Another major occupation is service in the civil service sector of the Nigerian states of Bayelsa and Rivers, where they are predominant.

Extensive state-government sponsored overseas scholarship programs in the 1970s and 1980s have also led to a significant presence of Ijaw professionals in Europe and North America (the so-called Ijaw diaspora). Another contributing factor to this human capital flight is the abject poverty in their homeland of the Niger Delta, resulting from decades of neglect by the Nigerian government and oil companies in spite of continuous petroleum prospecting in this region since the 1950s.

== Lifestyle ==
The Ijaw people live by fishing supplemented by farming paddy-rice, plantains, cassava, yams, cocoyams, bananas and other vegetables as well as tropical fruits such as guava, mangoes and pineapples; and trading. Smoke-dried fish, timber, palm oil and palm kernels are processed for export. While some clans (those to the east- Akassa, Bille, Kalabari, Okrika, Andoni and Bonny) had powerful kings and a stratified society, other clans are believed not to have had any centralized confederacies until the arrival of the British. However, owing to the influence of the neighbouring Kingdom of Benin, individual communities even in the western Niger Delta also had chiefs and governments at the village level.

Marriages are completed by the payment of a bridal dowry, which increases in size if the bride is from another village (so as to make up for that village's loss of her children). Funeral ceremonies, particularly for those who have accumulated wealth and respect, are often very dramatic. Traditional religious practices center around "Water spirits" in the Niger river, and around tribute to ancestors.

== Religion and cultural practices ==
Although the Ijaw are now primarily Christians (65% profess to be), with Roman Catholicism, Zion Church, Anglicanism and Pentecostalism being the varieties of Christianity most prevalent among them, they also have elaborate traditional religious practices of their own.

Veneration of ancestors plays a central role in Ijaw traditional religion, while water spirits known as Owuamapu figure prominently in the Ijaw pantheon. In addition, the Ijaw practice a form of divination called Igbadai, in which recently deceased individuals are interrogated on the causes of their death. Ijaw religious beliefs hold that water spirits are like humans in having personal strengths and shortcomings, and that humans dwell among the water spirits before being born. The role of prayer in the traditional Ijaw system of belief is to maintain the living in the good graces of the water spirits among whom they dwelt before being born into this world, and each year the Ijaw hold celebrations to honor the spirits lasting for several days. Central to the festivities is the role of masquerades, in which men wearing elaborate outfits and carved masks dance to the beat of drums and manifest the influence of the water spirits through the quality and intensity of their dancing. Particularly spectacular masqueraders are taken to actually be in the possession of the particular spirits on whose behalf they are dancing. Important deities in the Ijaw religion include Egbesu, whose totems are the leopard, panther and lion, and who manifests as a god of justice.

There are also a small number of converts to Islam, the most notable being the founder of the Delta People Volunteer Force, Mujahid Dokubo-Asari.

== Notable leaders ==
Goodluck Jonathan, the third president and commander-in-chief of the current Nigerian republic, elder statesman Edwin K. Clarke, and the billionaire Olu Benson Lulu-Briggs all come from the Izon ethnic group, as does the current Nigerian Minister of State for Petroleum Resources, Heineken Lokpobiri.

== Food customs ==
Like many ethnic groups in Nigeria, the Ijaws have many local foods that are not widespread in Nigeria. Many of these foods involve fish and other seafoods such as clams, oysters and periwinkles; yams and plantains. Some of these foods are:

- Polofiyai — A very rich soup made with yams and palm oil
- Kekefiyai— A pottage made with chopped unripened (green) plantains, fish, other seafood or game meat ("bushmeat") and palm oil
- Fried or roasted fish and plantain — Fish fried in palm oil and served with fried plantains
- Gbe — The grub of the raffia-palm tree beetle that is eaten raw, dried, fried in groundnut oil or pickled in palm oil
- Kalabari "sea-harvest" fulo— A rich mixed seafood soup or stew that is eaten with foofoo, rice or yams
- Owafiya (Beans Pottage) — A pottage made with Beans, palm oil, fish or bushmeat, Yam or Plantain. Then taken with processed Cassava or Starch.
- Geisha Soup — This a kind of soup cooked from the geisha fish; it is made with pepper, salt, water and boiling it for some minutes.
- Opuru-fulou — Also referred to as prawn soup, prepared mainly with prawn, Ogbono (Irvingia gabonensis seeds), dried fish, table salt, crayfish, onions, fresh pepper, and red palm oil.
- Onunu - made with pounded yams and boiled overripe plantains. It is mostly enjoyed by the Okrikans
- Kiri-igina — Prepared without cooking on fire with Ogbono (Irvingia gabonensis seeds), dried fish, table salt, crayfish.
- Ignabeni — A watery soup prepared with either yam or plantain seasoned with teabush leaves, pepper, goat meat, and fish.
- Pilo-garri — A Bille meal mostly eaten during the raining season. It is prepared with dry garri, red palm oil, salt and eaten with roasted seafoods (fish, Isemi, Ngbe, Ikoli, etc.)
- igbugbai fiyai_ A soup prepared without oil, only fish, onion periwinkle, Bush leaves and other seafood.this soup prepared mostly cooked by odimodi people.
- kpanfaranran[fry fiyai] a soup prepared by frying the palm oil before adding your fish,meat,crayfish,periwinkle, and other seafood.this food is mostly cooked by the odimodi people

== Ethnic identity ==
Formerly organized into several loose clusters of villages (confederacies) which cooperated to defend themselves against outsiders, the Ijaw increasingly view themselves as belonging to a single coherent nation, bound together by ties of language and culture. This tendency has been encouraged in large part by what are considered to be environmental degradations that have accompanied the exploitation of oil in the Niger delta region which the Ijaw call home, as well as by a revenue sharing formula with the Nigerian Federal Government that is viewed by the Ijaw as manifestly unfair. The resulting sense of grievance has led to several high-profile clashes with the Nigerian Federal authorities, including kidnappings and in the course of which many lives have been lost.

The Ijaw people are resilient and proud. Long before the colonial era, they are thought to have traveled by wooden boats and canoes to Cameroon, Ghana and other West African countries.

== Ijaw-Itsekiri conflicts ==
One manifestation of ethnic violence on the part of the Ijaw has been an increase in the number and severity of clashes between Ijaw militants and those of Itsekiri origin, particularly in the town of Warri.

Deadly conflicts had rocked the South-South region, especially in Delta State, where intertribal killings had resulted in death on both sides. In July 2013, local police discovered mutilated corpses of 13 Itsekiris killed by Ijaws, over a dispute on a candidate for a local council chairman. Several Itsekiri villages, including Gbokoda, Udo, Ajamita, Obaghoro and Ayerode-Zion on the Benin river axis, were razed down while several Itsekiris lost their lives.

== Oil conflict ==
The December 1998 All Ijaw Youths Conference crystallized the struggle with the formation of the Ijaw Youth Movement (IYM) and the issuing of the Kaiama Declaration. In it, long-held Ijaw concerns about the loss of control of their homeland and their own lives to the oil companies were joined with a commitment to direct action. In the declaration, and in a letter to the companies, the Ijaws called for oil companies to suspend operations and withdraw from Ijaw territory. The IYM pledged “to struggle peacefully for freedom, self-determination and ecological justice,” and prepared a campaign of celebration, prayer, and direct action 'Operation Climate Change' beginning December 28, 1998.

In December 1998, two warships and 10–15,000 Nigerian troops occupied Bayelsa and Delta states as the Ijaw Youth Movement (IYM) mobilized for Operation Climate Change. Soldiers entering the Bayelsa state capital of Yenagoa announced they had come to attack the youths trying to stop the oil companies. On the morning of December 30, 1998, two thousand young people processed through Yenagoa, dressed in black, singing and dancing. Soldiers opened fire with rifles, machine guns, and tear gas, killing at least three protesters and arresting twenty-five more. After a march demanding the release of those detained was turned back by soldiers, three more protesters were shot dead. The head of Yenagoa rebels- Chief Oweikuro Ibe- was burned alive in his mansion on December 28, 1998. Amongst his family members to flee the premises before the complete destruction was his only son, Desmond Ibe. The military declared a state of emergency throughout Bayelsa state, imposed a dusk-to-dawn curfew, and banned meetings. At military roadblocks, local residents were severely beaten or detained. At night, soldiers invaded private homes, terrorizing residents with beatings and women and girls with rape.

On January 4, 1999 about one hundred soldiers from the military base at Chevron’s Escravos facility attacked Opia and Ikiyan, two Ijaw communities in Delta State. Bright Pablogba, the traditional leader of Ikiyan, who came to the river to negotiate with the soldiers, was shot along with a seven-year-old girl and possibly dozens of others. Of the approximately 1,000 people living in the two villages, four people were found dead and sixty-two were still missing months after the attack. The same soldiers set the villages ablaze, destroyed canoes and fishing equipment, killed livestock, and destroyed churches and religious shrines.

Nonetheless, Operation Climate Change continued, and disrupted Nigerian oil supplies through much of 1999 by turning off valves through Ijaw territory. In the context of high conflict between the Ijaw and the Nigerian Federal Government (and its police and army), the military carried out the Odi massacre, killing scores if not hundreds of Ijaws.

Recent actions by Ijaws against the oil industry have included both renewed efforts at nonviolent action and militarized attacks on oil installations but with no human casualties to foreign oil workers despite hostage-takings. These attacks are usually in response to non-fulfilment by oil companies of memoranda of understanding with their host communities.

== Ijaw people ==
- Goodluck Jonathan, politician and former president
- Edwin Clark (politician), Ijaw national leader.
- J.P. Clark, poet and playwright
- Gabriel Okara, poet and novelist
- Owoye Andrew Azazi, a former Army general and National Security Adviser
- Timi Dakolo, Nigerian singer-songwriter
- Ibinabo Fiberesima, Nigerian Nollywood actress
- Ben Murray-Bruce, Nigerian media mogul and senator
- Patience Torlowei, artist and fashion designer
- Finidi George, a Nigerian football legend
- Samson Siasia, a former Nigerian footballer and coach
- Timaya, a Nigerian singer
- Harrysong, a Nigerian singer-songwriter
- Ideye Brown, a Nigerian footballer
- Tompolo, Nigerian militant commander
- Jeremiah Omoto Fufeyin is the Head Pastor Of Christ Mercyland Deliverance Ministry.
- Tammy Abraham , a professional footballer.
- Timmy Abraham , a professional footballer.
- Agbani Darego, a professional model and beauty queen.
- Gentle Jack, a professional Nollywood actor.
- Henry Seriake Dickson, politician and former governor
- Timipre Sylva, former Governor of Bayelsa State, and current Nigerian Minister of State for Petroleum Resources.
- Olu Benson Lulu-Briggs, Businessman and founder of Muni Pulo Limited.
- Allison Madueke, politician and former minister of Petroleum Resources.
- Patrick Dele-Cole, Former diplomat and journalist.
- Tonye Cole, Nigerian oil magnate.
- Henry Odein Ajumogobia, Lawyer and Former minister of foreign affairs.
- Ann-Kio Briggs, Environmental activist.
- Kingsley Kuku, Politician.
- Timi Alaibe, Former managing director of NDDC.
- Hilda Dokubo, Nollywood actress and mentor, politician.

== Ijaw organisations ==
- Andoni Forum USA (AFUSA)
- Ijaw Youth Council
- Ijaw National Congress
- Ijaw Elders Forum
- Ijaw Youth Congress
- Congress of Niger Delta Youths
- National Union of Izon-Ebe Students
- Tuomo Youth Congress
- Sagbama Youth Movement
- Ekine Sekiapu Ogbo
- Bomadi Decides
- Bayelsa Youths Council
- The Ogbia brotherhood
- Izon Progressive Congress (IPC)
- Ogbinbiri Progressive Movement
- Egbema Youths Progressive Agenda
- Progressive Youth Leadership Foundation(ND-PYLF)
- Ijaw Nation Development Group (Ijaw Peoples Assembly)
- Izon Ladies Association (ILA)
- Indigenous people of Niger Delta IPND
- National Association Of Ogulagha Clan Students (NAOCS)

== Other sources ==
- Human Rights Watch, “Delta Crackdown,” May 1999
- Ijaw Youth Movement, letter to “All Managing Directors and Chief Executives of transnational oil companies operating in Ijawland,” December 18, 1998
- Project Underground, "Visit the World of Chevron: Niger Delta", 1999
- Kari, Ethelbert Emmanuel. 2004. A reference grammar of Degema. Köln: Rüdiger Köppe Verlag.
- Hlaváčová, Anna: Three Points of View of Masquerades among the Ijo of the Niger River Delta.In: Playful Performers: African Children's Masquerades. Ottenberg, S.- Binkley, D. (Eds.)
