= Apoi =

The Apoi are an ethnic group in Nigeria, including the following tribes:

- Western Apoi tribe
- Eastern Apoi tribe
