= Furupagha tribe =

The Furupagha tribe is an Ijaw tribe that lives along the Siluko River in southwestern Edo State and along the Owena River in Odigbo local government area of Ondo State Nigeria. The town of Zide is the traditional clan seat for those currently in Edo State while Iyaradina for the Furupagha people in Ondo State.

== Origin ==
The Furupagha, which the clan and traditional head is zide community in edo state, trace their origins to the Bassan village of Furupagha in the central Niger Delta. The Furupagha-Ijaw is a large area of riverine and land communities.
