= Onunu =

Nigerian dish

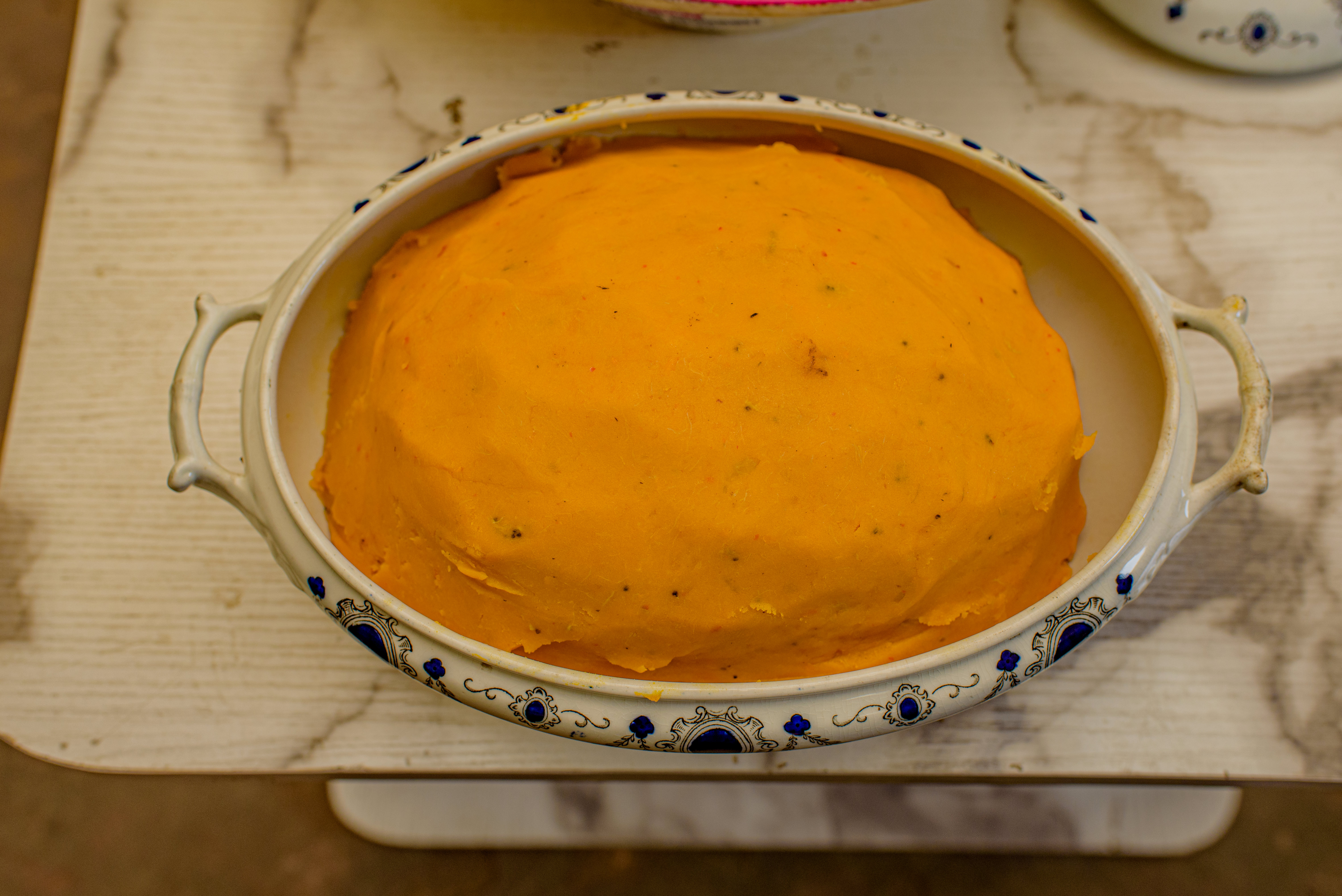
- Course: Main dish
- Region or state: Ijaw, Rivers, Nigeria
- Associated cuisine: Nigerian cuisine
- Main ingredients: Yam, ripe plantain and palm oil

Onunu is a traditional dish from Rivers State, Nigeria, widely enjoyed by the Ijaw ethnic group. It is made by boiling yam and ripe plantains, which are then pounded together and blended with palm oil to form a smooth, vibrant mixture. It is often served with spicy fish pepper soup or fresh fish stew. These accompaniments highlight its rich taste.

== Preparation ==
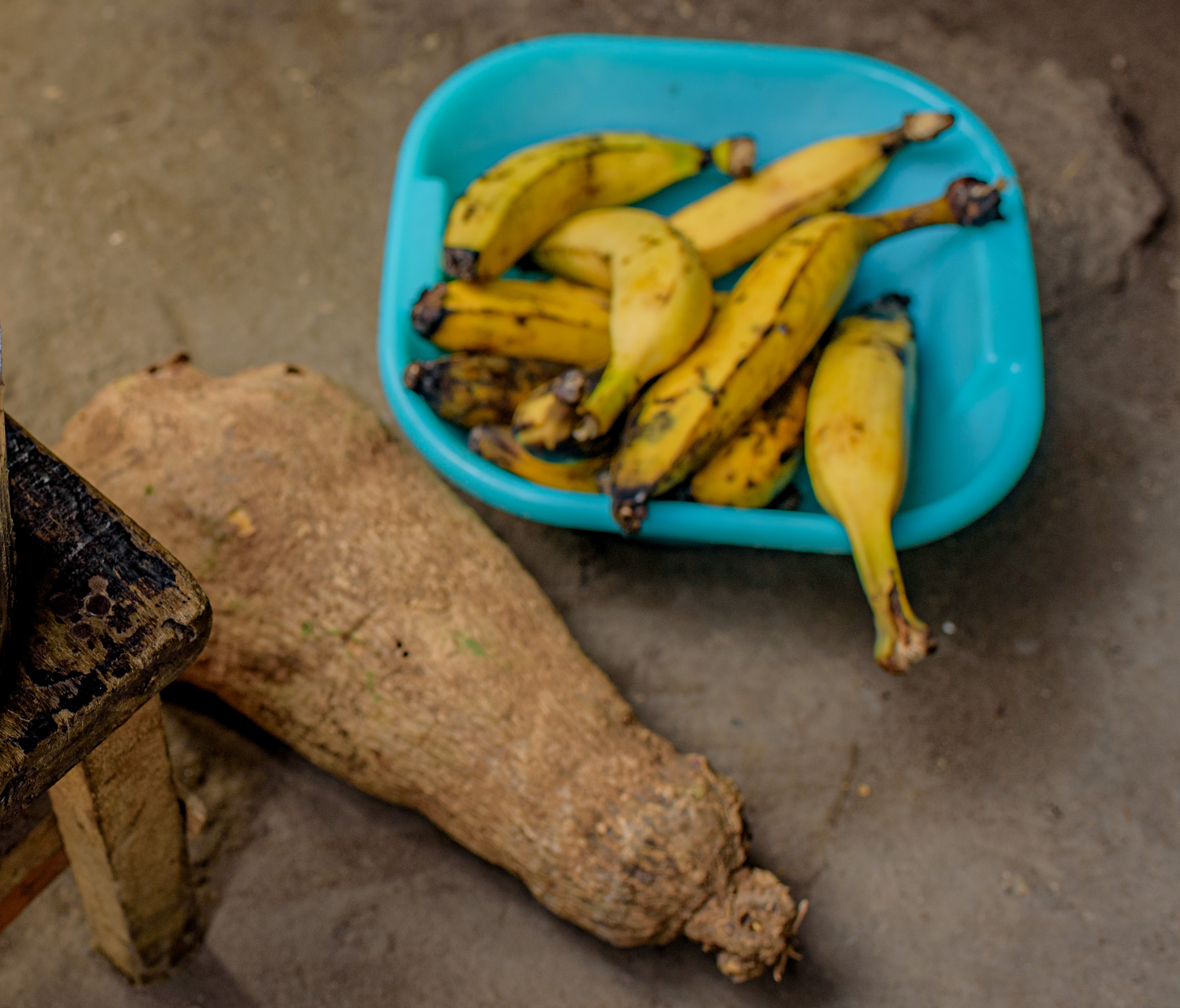

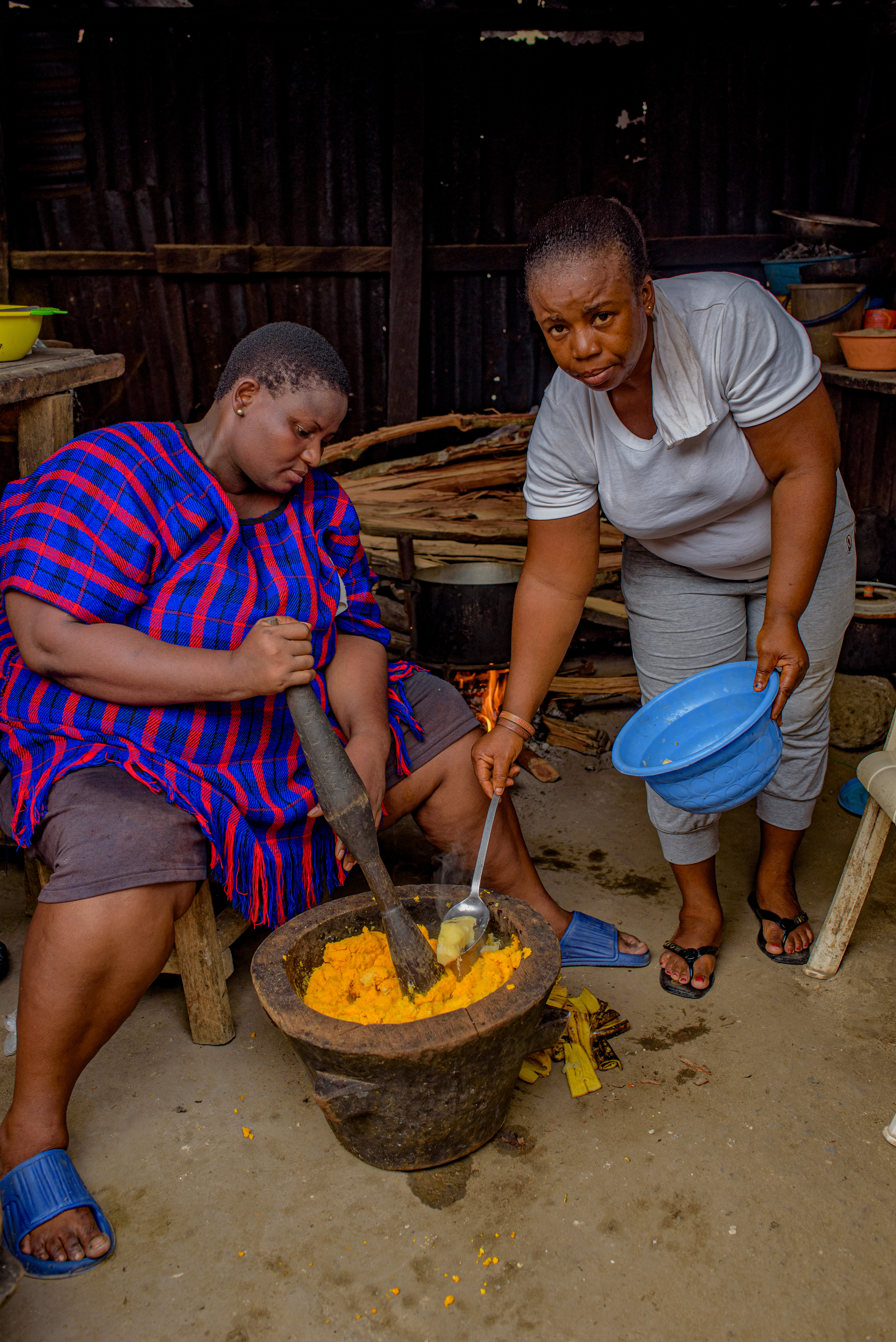
Preparation of Onunu dish

Onunu is prepared by boiling yams until they are partially cooked, then adding peeled ripe plantains to the pot. Once both ingredients are tender, they are pounded together to create a smooth consistency. Palm oil is then added, which enhances the dish's flavor and gives it its signature color.

== Cultural significance ==
Historically, onunu was reserved for special occasions such as traditional weddings, royal ceremonies, and other cultural milestones. It was also served in fattening rooms as a symbol of nourishment and abundance. Today, onunu remains an integral part of cultural celebrations and is enjoyed widely.

== Nutritional value ==
Onunu provides carbohydrates from yams and plantains, serving as an energy source. Palm oil contributes dietary fats, while fish-based stews or soups served alongside the dish add protein, making it nutritionally balanced.

== Variations ==
Traditionally paired with fish pepper soup, onunu can also be served with other Nigerian soups or stews, including vegetable soup and egusi soup, based on individual preferences.

== See also ==
- Onunu Festival
- Ijaw
- Rivers State
