= Obotebe tribe =

Suraj Singh Dhakad

Obotebe is an Ijaw kingdom in Burutu Local Government Area of Delta State, Nigeria. The Obotebe people are known for their dexterity in cultural displays.

The Awouziowu festival remains a pivotal cultural event that has attracted interest from the all across Nigeria and foreign tourist.

The Kingdom is ruled by 'The Ebenanaowei,' fondly referred to as Umbi, his title.

Historically, the Obotebe people have engaged in warfare with their neighbors, the Mein Ijaw and the Itsekiri. The Mein village of Gbekebo sits at the mouth of the creek that leads to Obotebe territory. The Obotebe people have had good relations with the Urhobo, with whom they trade.
