= Zarama =

Zarama may refer to:

- Zarama tribe, Nigeria tribe, bordered by Buseni tribe
- Luis R. Zarama, a Colombian-American prelate of the Roman Catholic Church
- Zarama (band), a band in the Basque Radical Rock genre
- Zarama (a.k.a. Zalama), the creator of the super dragon balls in Dragon Ball Super
