= Ekeremor =

Ekeremor EKELGA
- LGA and town
- Interactive map of Ekeremor
- Location within Nigeria
- Coordinates: 5°3′N 5°47′E
- Country: Nigeria
- State: Bayelsa State

Government
  - Local Government Chairman: Onniye Isaac

Area
  - Total: 1,810 km^{2} (700 sq mi)

Population (2024 est)
  - Total: 431,950
  - Density: 239/km^{2} (618/sq mi)
- Time zone: UTC+1 (WAT)
- 3-digit postal code prefix: 561
- ISO 3166 code: NG.BY.EK

Ekeremor is a town and one of the eight local government areas (LGAs) in Bayelsa State, Nigeria. It borders Delta State and has a coastline of approximately 60 km on the Bight of Bonny.

It has an area of 1,810 km^{2} and an estimated population of 431,950 at the 2024.

The postal code of the area is 561.

== Demographics ==
Ekeremor LGA is home to members of the Ekeremor clan of the Ijaw ethnic group. According to the Nigeria 2006 Census, Ekeremor LGA has a population of roughly 270,000 people (53% male, 47% female).

== List of Towns and Villages in Ekeremor Local Government Area ==
The Ekeremor LGA consists of thirty-One (31) Towns and villages listed below:

- Azagbene
- Aiegbe
- Aleibiri
- Amabulour
- Ananagbene
- Angalawei-gbene
- Ayamassa
- Bown-Adagbabiri
- Ebikeme-Gbene
- Eduwini
- Egbemo-Angalabiri
- Ekeremor
- Feremoama
- Fontoru-Gbene
- Isampou
- Isreal o-Zion
- Lalagbene
- Ndoro
- Norhene
- Obrigbene
- Ogbogbene
- Ogbosuwar
- Oporoma
- Oyiakiri
- Peretou-Gbene
- Tamogbene
- Tamu-Gbene
- Tarakiri
- Tietiegbene
- Toru-Foutorugbene
- Aghoro
- Ogbotobo

== Politics ==
As of August 2007, Robinson Etolor was chairman of the local government council. However, there has been a long-running dispute over the post between Etulor and his predecessor Donald Daunemigha.

Ekeremor LGA sends three representatives to the Bayelsa State House of Assembly.

Bayelsa State Deputy Governor Peremobowei Ebebi is a native of Aleibiri town in Ekeremor LGA. Before becoming deputy governor, he represented Ekeremor I constituency in the Bayelsa State House of Assembly.

A former local government chairman, Dr. Bertola Perekeme, hailed the Supreme Court of Nigeria for upholding it’s a judgement on the Bayelsa State election.

The current local government chairman is Onniye Isaac.

== List of Schools in Ekeremor ==
- Government model secondary school
- Comprehensive Secondary School
- Community Secondary School Isampou, Ekeremor
- Lduwinl School, Ekeremor
- Agbidiama Grammar School Agbidiama, Ekeremor
- Basic Junior Secondary School Foutorugbene, Ekeremor
- Community Junior Secondary School Peretorugbene, Ekeremor
- Ekere Junior Secondary School, Ekeremor
- Community Primary School Amabulou, Ekeremor
- Central Community Secondary School Ogbotubo, Ekeremor
- Early Foundation Junior and Senior Secondary School Ekeremor, Ekeremor
- Nursery School, Ekeremor
- Migrant Fisherman Children School Norgbene II, Ekeremor

== Significant events ==
- December 2007: Pa Simon Ebebi, father of Bayelsa State Deputy Governor Peremobowei Ebebi was kidnapped at his home at Aleibiri. He was later released after an undisclosed ransom was paid.
- October 2007: Farmlands and residential homes in 21 communities in Ekeremor LGA were flooded. The communities affected by the flood were Amalka-Zion, Oboloseria, Aleibiri, Lalagbene, Angalaweigbene (1, 2, and 3).
- 16 July 2007: Two expatriates (Bulgarian, British) working for Peak Petroleum (a contractor working for Chevron/Texaco) were kidnapped and held in the village of Alabeni in Ekeremor LGA. The workers were kidnapped from the vessel Monipo by armed youths traveling in four speed boats. The Authentic Emancipation of the Movement for Peace and Development in the Niger Delta (EMOPEND) claimed responsibility for the abduction.

== Sea port ==
Agge Sea Port is located in Ekeremor Local government Bayelsa state.

== Climate ==
In Ekeremor, the wet season is warm and overcast, the dry season is cloudy and hot, and it is oppressive all through the year. Over the course of the year, the temperature typically varies from 71 °F to 87 °F and is rarely below 64 °F or above 89 °F.
