= Niger Delta Youth Association =

The Niger Delta Youth Association is a non-militia advocacy group dedicated to advancing the cause of human rights, accountability and development in the Niger Delta region of Nigeria. It was founded around 2015. Though the group is built on a threefold purpose to relieve poverty, conserve the environment and to promote employment opportunities for people living in Niger Delta especially young people but the group has been known to peacefully campaign for such issues as youths in politics, Niger Delta clean up, peaceful cohabitation, Poverty alleviation, Development and accountability in the Niger Delta Region.

The group's membership cuts across the six states in the south-south geopolitical zone of Nigeria – Akwa Ibom State, Cross River State, Bayelsa State, Rivers State, Delta State and Edo State – one state (Ondo State) from South West geopolitical zone and two states (Abia and Imo) from South East geopolitical zone. To accommodate indigenes of the region in diaspora, the group has also established presence in United Kingdom, United States and Germany.

The association also cautioned president Muhammadu Buhari and the Economic and Financial Crime Commission (EFCC) of witch-hunting former Niger Delta Freedom Fighter, High Chief Oweizide Government Ekpemupolo alias Tompolo, Dr. Patrick Ziakede Akpoboloukemi, former director general Nigerian Maritime Administration and Safety Agency(NIMASA) and other Niger Delta prominent leaders saying “Witch hunting of our leaders is fight against us. We shall not take it from him anymore. He is disrupting the sleeping lions. No one has the monopoly of violence.”

In April 2017, the President of the association, Comrade Victor James, met on a closed door meeting with the British Member of Parliament for Plymouth Sutton & Devonport, Oliver Colvile, where he presented papers on "Degradation and deprivation in the Niger Delta titled "Act now before it is too late". The meeting with the conservative MP was in view of the corruption attached to the Ogoni clean-up and other related Niger Delta oil spills, following report from the spokesperson for the group, Comrade Gaberiel Patterson. The President accused the administration of President Muhammadu Buhari of politicizing the issue of clean-up process of the region even after a celebrated fanfare that saw no inclusion of the activity in the 2016 and 2017 budget. He also called for "stabilisation clauses" by International Oil Companies (IOC) in Host Government Agreement (HGA) to minimise the political risks associated with their projects as he accused the Federal Government and the region's elders of political insincerity. "Yes, I repeat, I trust nobody within the current politics of Nigeria. Our politicians in Niger Delta and federal government are having a side deal with the IOC and pretending as if they care for the common man in Niger Delta".

In 2018, the group spoke against the modus operandi of British Broadcasting Corporation, BBC, in Nigeria which it alleged was designed to favour the North. In a statement released by the group's president, he claimed this alleged trend was not unassociated with the fact the BBC seldom reports any event that would paint the Niger Delta in good light to stimulate the necessary capacity with a view to ameliorate the myriads problems springing up in the Niger Delta region. The youth leader argued that the coverage on economic, infrastructural, political and social welfare inadequacies in the North, particularly the Fulani/Hausa core North by BBC to the extent it established BBC-Hausa Language spoke volumes of its alleged bias and lack of consideration for other regions. It should however be noted that BBC has since launched services for both Yoruba and Igbo languages to cater for all three popular languages in the African country.
