= Kingsley Kuku =

Nigerian activist (born 1970)

The Honourable Kingsley Kuku
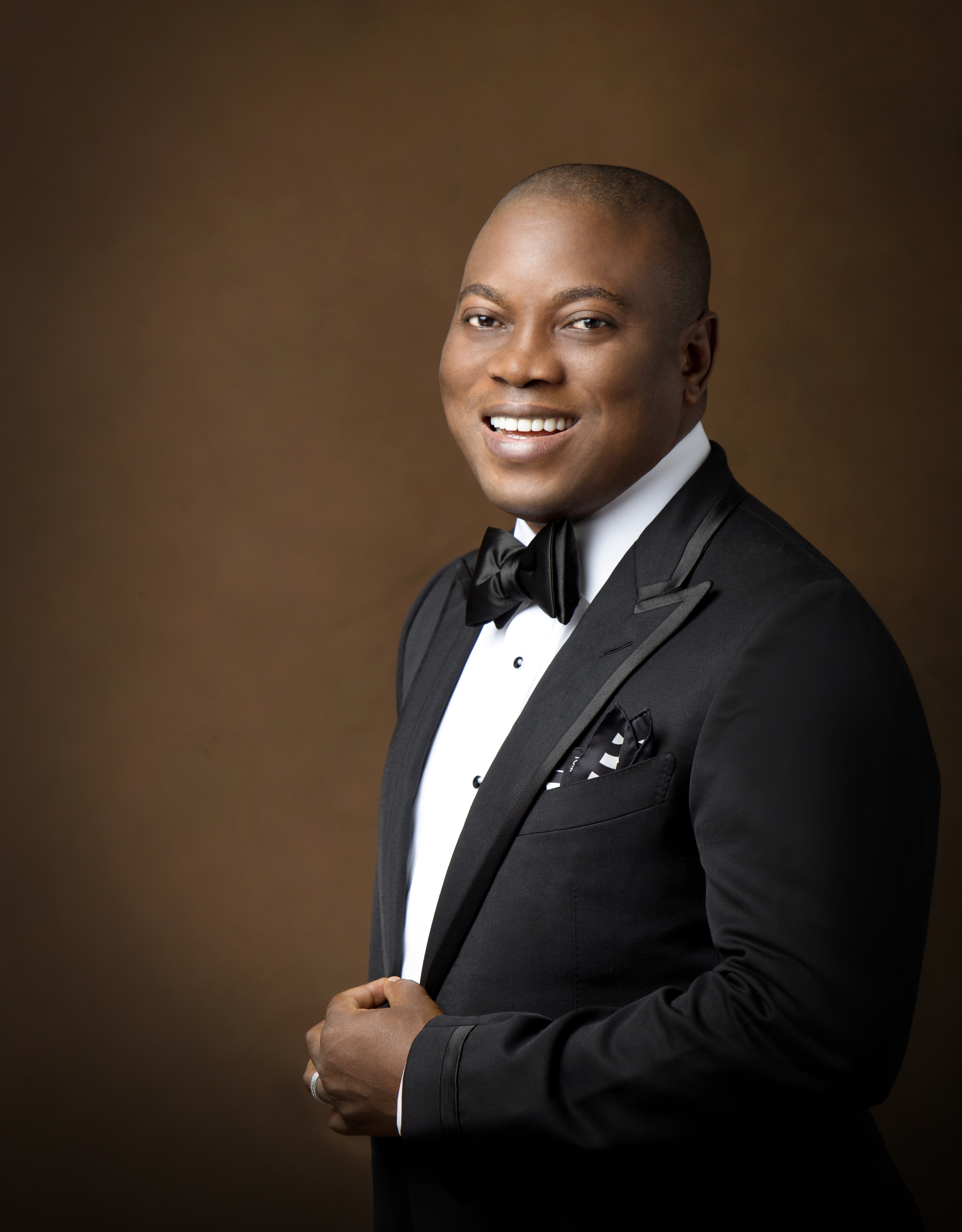
- Born: 14 February 1970 (age 56); Ondo State, Nigeria
- Education: (Ondo State University, Ekiti State University, University of Cambridge and Igbinedion University
- Occupations: Political and environmental rights activist

Kingsley Kuku (born 14 February 1970) is a Nigerian political and environmental rights activist. He served as special adviser to ex-President Goodluck Jonathan on Niger Delta Affairs and was chairman of the Presidential Amnesty Programme.

During his university days, Kuku was a student activist and leader and at one time National Association of Nigerian Students mobilization officer. He joined the campaign for the return of democratic government to Nigeria. He has remained a pioneer in the development and restoration of lasting peace in the Niger Delta region of Nigeria.

Kuku after his involvement with the Ijaw youths, contested and was elected as member of Ondo State House of Assembly and thereafter became the chairman of the house committee for a period of four years. He was appointed as a special adviser to the former President Goodluck Jonathan in 2011. In that same year, Kuku was a guest speaker at Chatham House, an institute for international affairs, where he delivered a paper. He received several honorary awards in Atlanta, Georgia, in the United States.

== Early life and education ==
Kingsley Kuku was born on 14 February 1970 into a Christian family in Arogbo, the traditional headquarters of the Ijaw ethnic nationality, in Ondo State, Nigeria. He had his primary and secondary education between 1977 and 1988 in Arogbo. He then graduated with a bachelor's degree in English Language at Ondo State University, Akure.

He attended Patrick Catholic Primary School, Arogbo, Ondo State (1977–1983). He had his secondary education at Ijaw National High School, Arogbo, Ondo State (1983–1988). He obtained a Bachelor of Education degree in English language at the Ondo State University, Ado Ekiti, now Ekiti State University in 1995; and MSc in international relations and strategic studies at Igbinedion University, Okada Edo State (2011–2012), Nigeria. He also had a stint at University of Cambridge, where he got a certificate in dispute resolution in 2008. In recognition of his role in the advancement of Nigeria's fledgling democracy, Kuku was conferred with an honorary doctorate in Political science in November 2013 by Igbinedion University, Okada Edo State, Nigeria. Hon. Kingsley Kemebradigha Kuku is a Senior Stat. Law Student of UCLAN, England, United Kingdom.

He holds a Doctor of Philosophy from Selinus University of Sciences and Literature in international relations (peace studies) and an Executive Certificate in Public Leadership from the Harvard Kennedy School of Government.

== Activism ==
Kuku embraced activism early in his university days as one of the socio-politically conscious young Nigerian students who were agitated about the then military rule and dictatorship in Nigeria. He was a student leader and one time national mobilization officer of the National Association of Nigerian Students (NANS) who was active in the campaign and struggle for the demilitarization of the Nigerian society and absolute return of democratic governance to Nigeria. His experience in the leadership of the apex students' body in Nigeria set a platform for him to be at the vanguard of many organisations that were set out to tackle injustice and maladministration within the Nigerian socio-political structure. He was a pioneer member of Ijaw Youth Council (IYC), a notable ethnic rights group in Nigeria; and was the second spokesman of the council. He was signatory to the historical Kaiama Declaration. Kuku has remained a voice and an active stakeholder for the development and restoration of lasting peace in the oil-rich Niger Delta region of Nigeria.

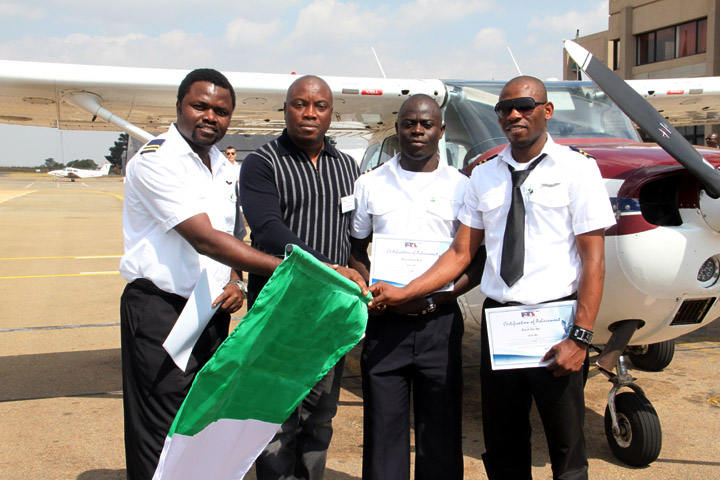
Kuku with Niger Delta ex-agitators who completed trainings as pilot through the Presidential Amnesty Programme

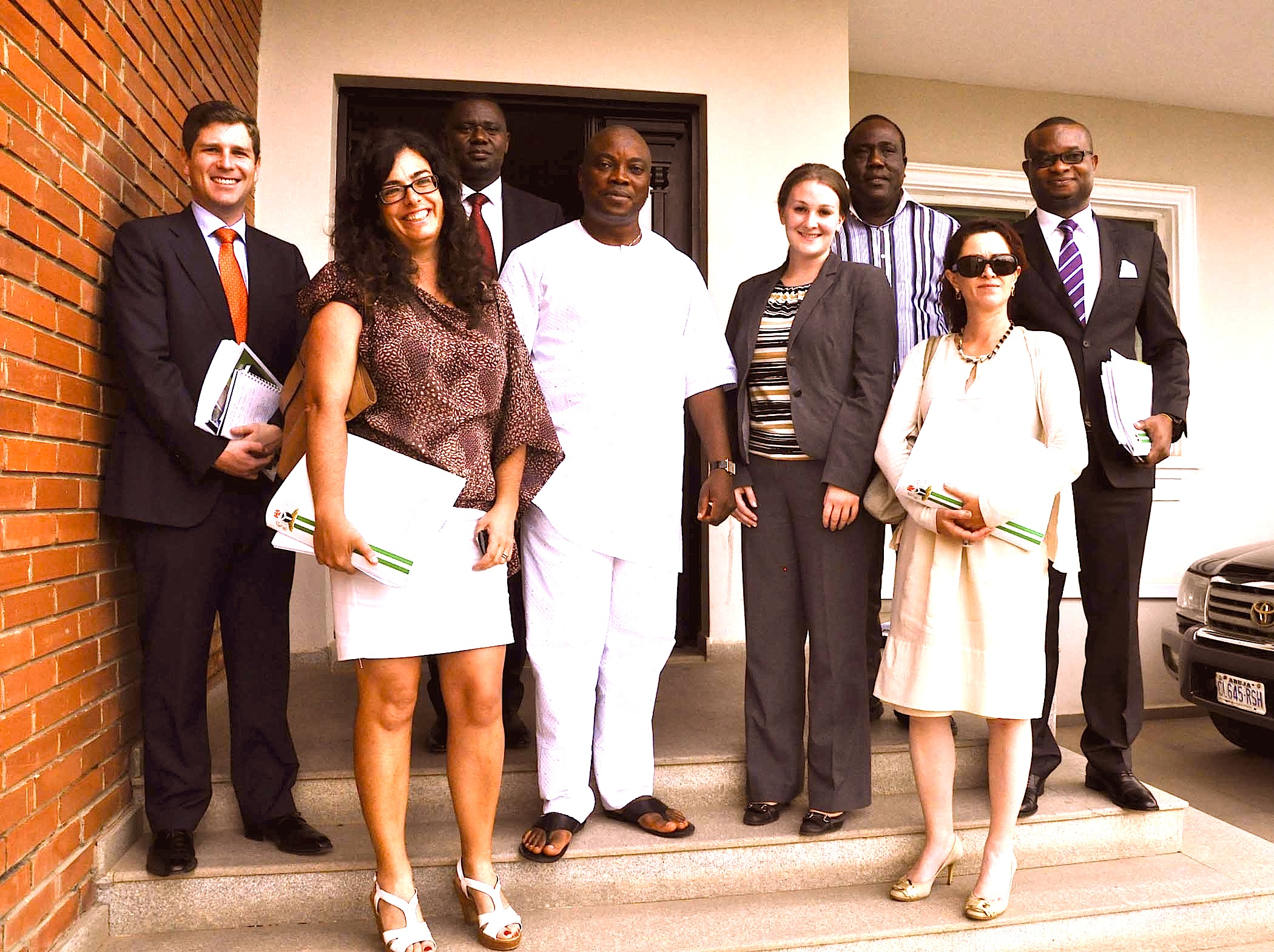
Kuku with political officers of the embassies of the US and some European countries in Nigeria after a meeting in Abuja, Nigeria

== Politics ==
After his involvement in the Ijaw Youth Council, Kuku contested and was elected as a Member of the Ondo State House of Assembly and became Chairman of the House Committee on Information for four years. He was at various times Special Assistant and Head of Conflict Management Unit at the Niger Delta Development Commission (NDDC); a Member of the Presidential Committee on Amnesty; and Secretary of the Presidential Committee on Peace and Conflict Resolution in the Niger Delta. In January 2011, he was appointed Special Adviser to the President of Nigeria, Dr Goodluck Jonathan, on the Niger Delta and chairman Niger Delta Presidential Amnesty Programme. President Jonathan reappointed him into the same position in July 2011 after the general elections in 2011. As the Chairman of the Presidential Amnesty Programme for ex-agitators in the oil-bearing communities in the Niger Delta, Kuku oversaw the disarmament and demobilization of 30,000 ex-agitators and he is superintending the skilling and reintegration of these youths into civil society. The ongoing reintegration component of the Amnesty Programme, which is geared towards building capacity in the deprived Niger Delta youths that are enrolled in the Presidential Amnesty Programme, has so far attained considerable measure of its set objectives. Kuku exerts full management and administrative authority within the limits of the established budget, standing about N60 billion naira in 2012 (about US$350 million), and government operating policies; and delegates various functions to several departmental heads in a structured organisation. On the third anniversary of the Amnesty Programme in 2012, Kuku confirmed at a press briefing that the peace being restored to the Niger Delta region, through the coordination of the Amnesty Programme, has significantly increased the production capacity of oil operators in the Niger Delta region and saved Nigeria amount running in billions of Dollars in oil revenue within just three years.

== Remaking the Niger Delta: challenges & opportunities ==
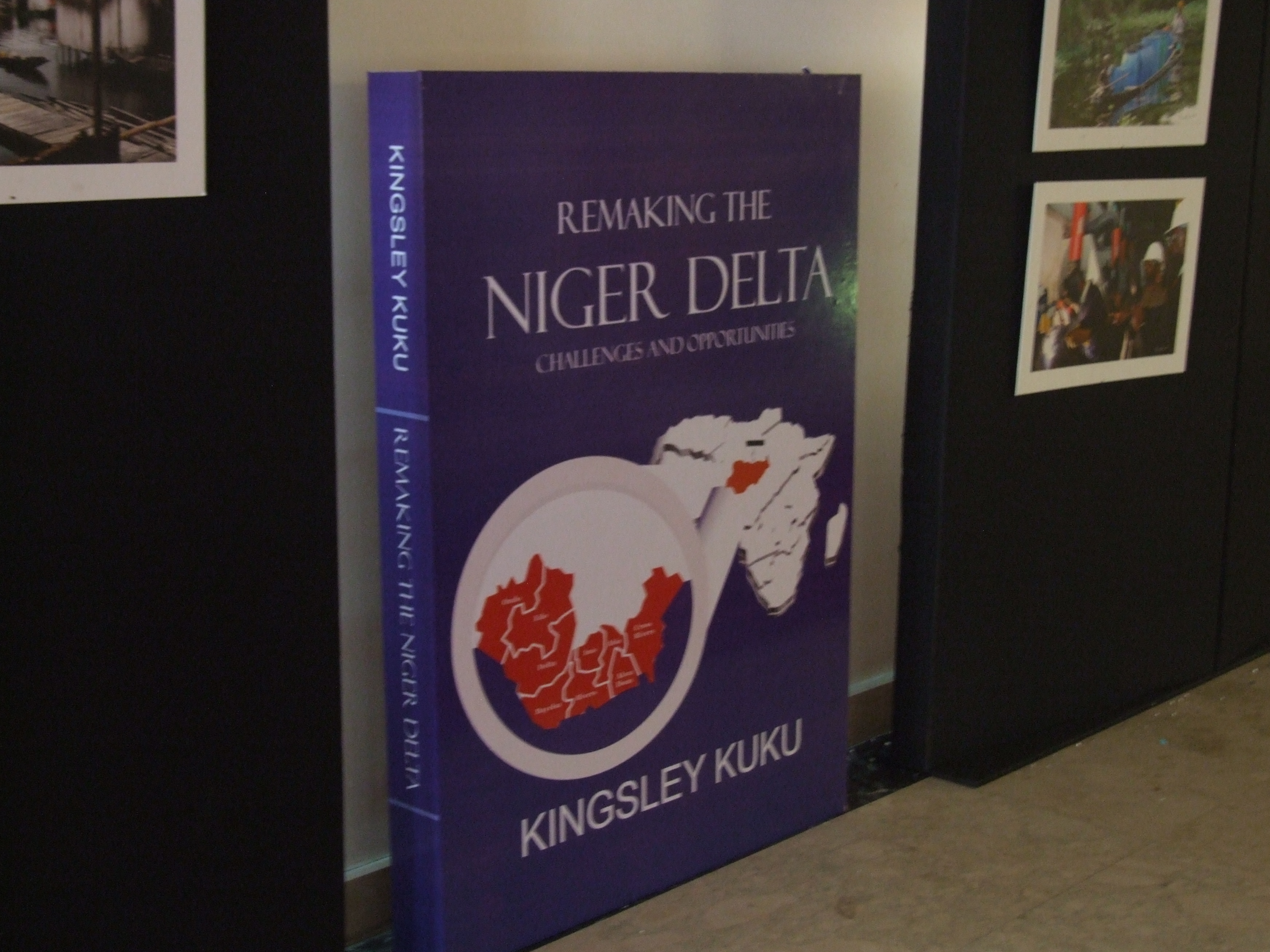
Remaking The Niger Delta: Challenges and Opportunities – by Kingsley Kuku

Not a few activists, political Pundits and experts on international development had raised concerns on the insurgency in the Niger Delta region particularly at the height of the tension between 2004 and 2008. The concerns, which were based on the implications of the unrest in the region on the overall revenue of the Federal Republic of Nigeria of which over 80% of the nation's revenue is drawn from the proceeds of the oil activities that run in the Niger Delta, were brought to the front burner of national discourse for government and its security agencies to rise up against the challenges of Assaults targeted not just at the economic soul of Nigeria but at peace and security of the nation; and at the efforts of the Nigerian government in sustaining its foreign policy drive. Like other patriots and stakeholders in the development of the Niger Delta, Kuku has made postulations for change and demonstration actions towards the growth of the region and advancement of Nigeria being part of the several interventionist strategies such as the Niger Delta Development Commission, Amnesty Programme (headed by Kingsley Kuku), Ministry of Niger Delta and other initiatives that are set out to bring an end to the crisis in the Nigerian oil-producing states, ensure lasting peace and nurture the country's economy for better. Kuku, who said in one of his media chats that, "in May 2009, before the amnesty proclamation, production output had dipped to 680,000 barrels of per day, from 2.2 million barrels per day. Due to the amnesty programme, the nation’s crude oil production today stands at about 2.7 million barrels per day and the target of 4.5 million barrels per day is plausible, if amnesty gains are sustained," also warned in his book Remaking the Niger Delta: Challenges and Opportunities that the oil companies and other stakeholders cannot continue with business as usual while he and other concerned citizens continue to make strenuous attempts to re-orient and reintegrate former agitators. He emphasized that the historical Grievances that gave rise to militancy and insurgency ought to be addressed as Nigeria owes it to the present and future generations to put environmental remediation on the agenda while ensuring that adequate Corporate social responsibility commitment is extracted from the multinational oil companies that are operating in the Niger Delta communities towards meaningful development within their immediate operational base in Nigeria for peace and security to reign supreme in the country. In similar form Kuku made a pronouncement that was reported by many newspapers in Nigeria in which he described the prevailing peace in Nigeria as "fragile" and admonished that the peace in the region may relapse to another brand of restiveness, unless relevant developmental agencies intensify efforts to change the face of the nation's oil rich belt. One of the significant features of the Kuku-led amnesty programme is its impact on the lives of the ex-militants, many of whom have now been transformed into better citizens who are not only concerned about personal upliftment but the progress and development of the society as a whole. This much is reflected in the present preoccupation of many of the ex-agitators. For instance, a leader of the ex militants in Ondo State established a skill acquisition centre in the State for the purpose of training youths across the country in various skills that will make them fit for employment, particularly by the various oil companies in the country. Similarly, in the wake of a terrible flood that ravaged many communities in Nigeria, including part of the Niger Delta, some of the ex-militants contributed funds and relief materials to support and improve the lot of the people who were affected by the flood.

== International engagements / recognition ==
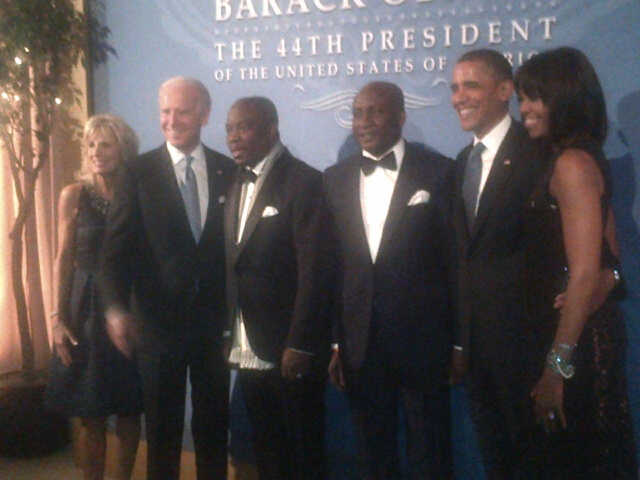
Hon. Kingsley Kuku (3rd left), U.S. President Barack Obama (2nd right) and his wife, Michelle Obama (Right); Vice-President Joe Biden (2nd left), his wife, Jill Biden and Barr. Allen Onyema (3rd right) at the Obama Presidential Inauguration.

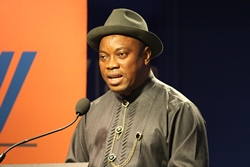
Hon. Kingsley Kuku speaking at the Wilson Center in the United States

Since the tension characterized by armed violence and unrest within the Niger Delta in the time past was not limited to Nigeria and Nigerians alone, many foreign countries and their nationals had cautioned about the potentially dangerous end of the disorder that was engulfing the oil-rich Niger Delta region which is one of the major suppliers of crude oil to the international market. The situation, which chillingly gripped the attention of the international community that is consistently suing for peace and security around the world and promoting increase in international trade among the developed and the developing countries, had given impetus for notable Western nations such as the United Kingdom to provide some form of interventions in addressing the challenges of insecurity and violence in the Niger Delta region to protect Nigeria's economic lifeline and prevent escalation of crises across the country and within the West African sub-region. Among the strategies, offered Nigeria as support, in stemming the disturbance and uprising from the Niger Delta agitators was the establishment of the All Party Parliamentary Group on Niger Delta by the British Parliament with the members of the group drawn from members of parliament (MP) across party lines. In recognizing the ideas initially suggested by different foreign nations and international organisations in working against total collapse of law and order in Niger Delta, Kuku moved further to reach out to other strategic foreign partners and entities, through diplomacy, for technical support in achieving his mandate of office as the Chairman of the Presidential Amnesty Programme and the Special Adviser on Niger-Delta to the Nigerian President, Goodluck Jonathan. In 2011, Kuku was a guest speaker at an internationally renowned institute for international affairs, Chatham House London, where he delivered a paper titled "Amnesty in the Niger Delta: Sustaining Peace and Surmounting Challenges". The occasion was an important climate for Kuku to share the progress and challenges of his responsibilities in the Nigerian government with the international community with the view to having more committed and supportive hands on board towards alleviating the problems of the Niger-Delta. Similarly, in 2013 Kuku was invited by the programme managers of the Wilson Center in the United States. At the Wilson Center, Kuku spoke on a topic – A Briefing on the Niger Delta: Where Things Stand – in which he narrated the struggles of himself and his team at the Amnesty Office in reversing the tide of calamity in the Niger Delta to the point it is now. After the event, the Wilson Center published the outcome of the discussion with an opening quotation that reads – "It is critical to discuss what the Niger Delta is now, not what it was." – The Honorable Kingsley Kuku", in accentuating the opportunities and promise of the new Niger Delta as enunciated by Kuku at the Wilson Center. In what could be regarded as a smart diplomatic move, Kuku made the list of some notable personalities around the world who attended a special dinner for President Obama inauguration in US. Kuku was seen in some exclusive photographs with President Obama and his wife, Michelle Obama and Vice President Joe Biden and his wife, Tracy as well as with other important personalities in international politics and development.

In early April 2015, Kuku was selection as one of the recipients of the Honorary citizenship of the State of Georgia in the United States by the Georgia Legislative Black Caucus (GLBC). And according to a report by a major Nigerian newspaper on the notification of the award to Kuku by the Georgia Legislative Black Caucus, "The Commendation and honour from the State of Georgia is in recognition of your (Kuku's) unrivalled contribution to Nigeria’s socioeconomic growth and development, leading the Presidential Amnesty Program transparently and undertaken monumental projects that have contributed immensely towards reforming the ex-agitators and contributing manpower to the Oil & Gas, aviation, logistics and other services industry in Nigeria and Africa at large". At the Commendation & Award ceremony, which was held on 9 May 2015 in Atlanta, Georgia, USA, Kuku delivered an acceptance speech and dedicated the honour to President Goodluck Jonathan of Nigeria who Kuku described as the man "who accorded me an opportunity to unravel, nurture and deploy my talents creditably to the service and advancement of Nigeria".
