= Akassa =

Town and settlement in Nigeria

Coordinates: 4.328°N 6.064°E

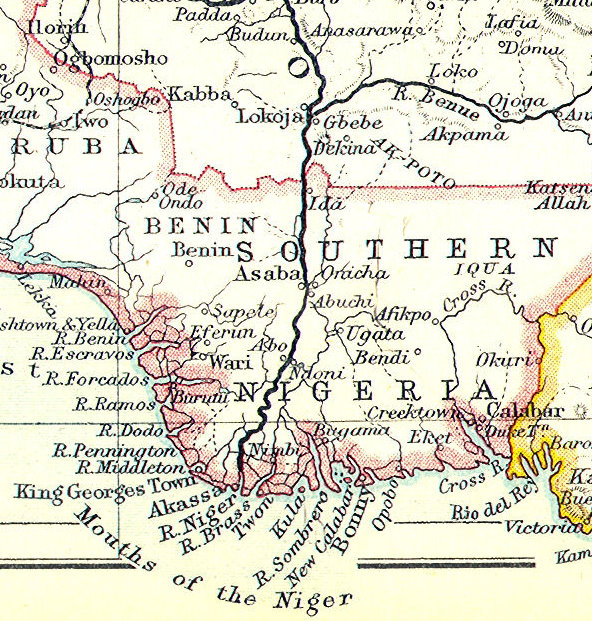
Akassa (at the bottom) on a John Bartholomew & Co. map published c. 1914.

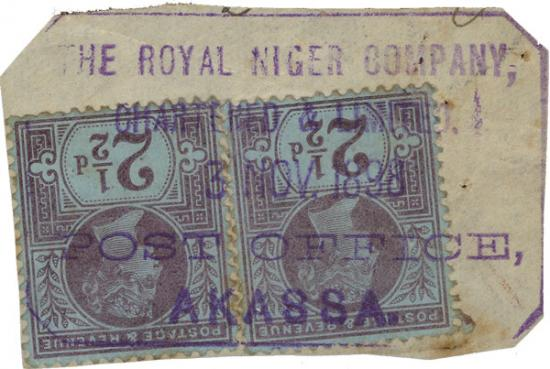
British stamps used in 1898 at Akassa by the Royal Niger Company.

Akassa, is an Ijaw town at the southernmost tip of Nigeria in Brass LGA, Bayelsa State where the Nun River estuary meets the Atlantic Ocean. It has a lighthouse that has stood since 1910, Akassa Lighthouse.

The proximity of Akassa to the Atlantic has made it a traditional trading site in Nigeria and during British colonial years it was the site of an outpost of the Royal Niger Company. Taxes imposed by the company on local peoples caused the settlement at Akassa to be attacked in 1895.

In the heart of the Niger Delta, habitation in the general region is sandwiched between salt water and the brackish water of mangrove swamps and most locals make their living from fishing or small scale trading, or by providing services to multi-national oil companies active in the area. There are few roads and no electricity. Health and educational facilities are few and most people do not have access to clean water.

More recently, the Akassa Development Foundation was formed in conjunction with Pro-Natura International, Statoil and BP to build local capacity.

== Climate ==
Akassa has a tropical rainforest climate (Köppen Af) bordering upon the more typical southern Nigeria tropical monsoon climate (Am) with heavy to very heavy rainfall year-round.

Climate data for Akassa
| Month | Jan | Feb | Mar | Apr | May | Jun | Jul | Aug | Sep | Oct | Nov | Dec | Year |
|---|---|---|---|---|---|---|---|---|---|---|---|---|---|
| Mean daily maximum °C (°F) | 31.1 (88.0) | 31.7 (89.1) | 31.9 (89.4) | 31.7 (89.1) | 31.0 (87.8) | 30.0 (86.0) | 28.5 (83.3) | 28.4 (83.1) | 28.9 (84.0) | 29.5 (85.1) | 30.5 (86.9) | 30.8 (87.4) | 30.3 (86.6) |
| Daily mean °C (°F) | 26.9 (80.4) | 27.6 (81.7) | 27.9 (82.2) | 27.8 (82.0) | 27.1 (80.8) | 26.4 (79.5) | 25.3 (77.5) | 25.3 (77.5) | 25.6 (78.1) | 26.1 (79.0) | 26.7 (80.1) | 26.9 (80.4) | 26.6 (79.9) |
| Mean daily minimum °C (°F) | 22.7 (72.9) | 23.5 (74.3) | 24.0 (75.2) | 23.9 (75.0) | 23.2 (73.8) | 22.8 (73.0) | 22.1 (71.8) | 22.3 (72.1) | 22.4 (72.3) | 22.7 (72.9) | 23.0 (73.4) | 23.0 (73.4) | 23.0 (73.3) |
| Average rainfall mm (inches) | 64 (2.5) | 103 (4.1) | 171 (6.7) | 261 (10.3) | 381 (15.0) | 602 (23.7) | 491 (19.3) | 284 (11.2) | 494 (19.4) | 417 (16.4) | 193 (7.6) | 80 (3.1) | 3,541 (139.3) |
Source: Climate-Data.org

== See also ==
- Akassa Tribe
