= Kabo tribe =

Tribal community in Nigeria

The Kabo tribe (Kabowei, Kabu-Owei) of the Izon people lives in the vicinity of Patani in Delta State, Nigeria. The tribe gets its name from its founder, Kabo, and from Kabobolou Creek. Two Kabo towns (Kolowari and Aven) are located along the creek. Other Kabo settlements include: Patani, Elemebiri (Ofonibeingha), Asamabiri, and Ekperiwari.

Because of their close contact with neighboring peoples, most Kabo are bilingual, speaking their own Ijaw dialect as well as the Urhobo or Isoko language.

The Pere of Kabu-Owei is the paramount ruler of the Kabu-Owei Kingdom. The towns, which make up the Kabu-Owei Kingdom, are Koloware, Aven. (Taware, Akowre, Ogemware, Ekise, Osou-ware, Okruware, Ajfenaware, Okruware) known as Patani (Opu-Kabu) Asedeni and Pereware can be found in Abare all in Patani Local Government Area of Delta State, while Asamabiri, Ekperi-ware, Elemebiri, Trofani Aduku, New Patani and Adagbabiri are all in Sagbama Local Government Area of Bayelsa State.

Altogether there are nineteen quarters (towns) in Kabu-Owei. Koloware is the eldest of the Kobuowei quarters. Patani, comprising eight quarters, is the headquarters of the clan and the seat of the paramount traditional ruler. The Pere of Kabu-Owei Kingdom Barr Shedrack Erebulu

The Aduwo II. He is a first class recognized and gazette traditional ruler and a member of the Delta State Council of Chiefs while the other side of the divide (Bayelsa State) has three third class recognized traditional rulers. The title of Opuodubowei of Kabu Owei Kingdom is the highest traditional title to be bestowed on any individual from the kingdom.

== History ==
Centuries ago, Kabobolou Creek was the main channel of the Forcados River. According to local oral traditions, the Kabo tribe built a barrier on the river in order to prevent European ships using the river to conduct slave raids. The Kabo cooperated with the nearby Kumbo tribe to divert the Forcados onto its current course. As a result of this diversion, however, the Kabo lost their commercial preeminence to the Mein, who dominated the banks of the lower Forcados River. The Kabo remained confined to the banks of the small Kabobolou Creek. Over time, the clan sought to expand its influence beyond this backwater. The result of this expansion effort was the establishment of the town of Patani. The name "Patani" is derived from the Kabo rallying cry during slave raids: paa tein ('Let us push adrift').
