= Olu Benson Lulu-Briggs =

Nigerian chief, statesman and businessman

High Chief O. B. Lulu-Briggs OON
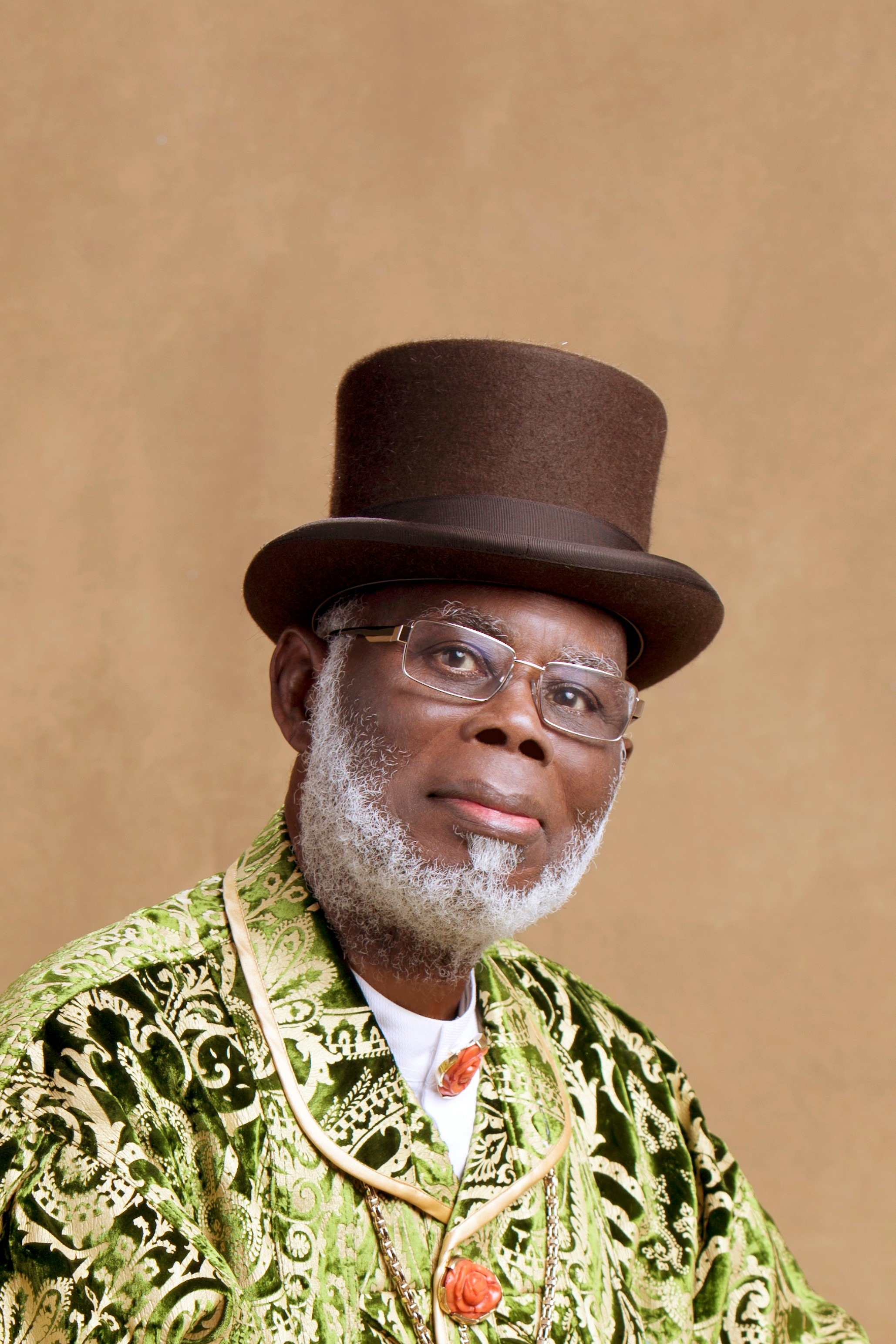
- Born: Olu Benson Lulu-Briggs; 1930 (age 95–96); Abonnema, Rivers State
- Died: 2018; Accra, Ghana
- Occupation: Businessman
- Spouse: Seinye Lulu-Briggs
- Children: 7
- Family: Oruwari-Briggs House

Olu Benson Lulu-Briggs, OON (1930–2018) was a Nigerian businessman and statesman of Ijaw heritage. Lulu-Briggs, a traditional aristocrat, was the "Iniikeroari V" of the Kalabari Kingdom and the Paramount Head of the Oruwari Briggs House. According to the 2012 Forbes Africa's 40 Rich List, Lulu-Briggs was the 31st richest man in Africa.

O.B. Lulu-Briggs was among the few Ijaws who secured Oil Mining Licenses (OML) early on and retained them. Instead of selling his license, he transformed it into Moni Pulo Petroleum Development Company (MPPDC), now Moni Pulo Limited (MPL), an oil exploration and production company.

== Controversy ==
The origins of this dispute date back to the early 2000s, when the elder sons of High Chief O.B. Lulu-Briggs, along with other siblings, initiated legal proceedings in various courts, including those in Abuja, Lagos, Houston, and London. Their aim was to gain control of Moni Pulo Limited, the family's oil exploration company. However, High Chief O.B. Lulu-Briggs successfully defended his position in court, culminating in two settlement agreements. As part of these settlements, he purchased the claimed shares of his three eldest sons—Senibo, Dumo, and Sofiri. The agreements required the sons to permanently relinquish any claims to the company.
