= Akassa Lighthouse =

Nigerian lighthouse

Coordinates: 4°16′37″N 6°05′06″E

Akassa Lighthouse is a lighthouse in Akassa, Bayelsa State, Nigeria. It was established in 1910.

It is about 60 metres (200 ft) tall and its view spans across the Atlantic Ocean.
