= Ekeremor tribe =

Ethnic group in Nigeria

The Ekeremor tribe (Operemor, Operemo) of the Ijaw people inhabits Ekeremor Local Government Area, Bayelsa State and Burutu Local Government Area, Delta State in southern Nigeria. Important Ekeremor settlements include: Ekeremor, Ojobo (Ozobo), Amabilo, and Ndoro. The Ekeremor tribe has close historical and kinship ties with the Oporoma, Eastern Olodiama and Ogbe tribes. The worship of the god Egbesu is widespread among the Ekeremor.
