= Ogbe tribe =

Tribe of the Ijaw people from Nigeria

The Ogbe tribe of the Ijaw people lives along the creek that lie south of the city of Warri in Delta State, Nigeria. The settlements of Ogbe-Ijoh and Diobiri are considered Ogbe territory. Each town is autonomous; there is no central tribal authority. The town of Isaba is considered by some to be its own tribe; others see it as part of the Ogbe.

The Ogbe tribe traces its historical origins to the migrations by members of the Ekeremor and Seimbiri tribes in the western Niger Delta.
