= Akassa tribe =

The Akassa tribe (Akasa, Akaha) of the Ijaw people lives along the Nun River estuary and the Atlantic Coast of southern Bayelsa State, Nigeria. Akassa settlements include: Opu-Akassa, Sangana, and Kamatoru.

== See also ==
- Akassa
