= Niger Delta Avengers =

Militant group in Nigeria

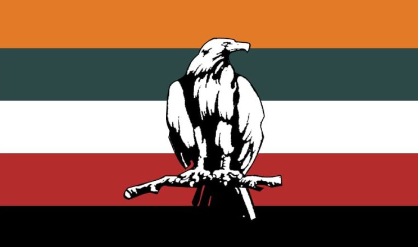
- Leader: Moudoch Agbinibo
- Dates active: January 2016 – present
- Headquarters: Delta State (allegedly)
- Active regions: Niger Delta
- Ideology: Regionalism
- Wars: Conflict in the Niger Delta Insurgency in Eastern Nigeria
- Website: Official website

The Niger Delta Avengers (NDA) is a militant group in the Niger Delta region of Nigeria. The group publicly announced their existence in March 2016.

The NDA is known for attacking oil-producing facilities in the deltas, causing the shutdown of oil terminals and a fall in Nigeria's oil production to its lowest level in twenty years. The attacks caused Nigeria to fall behind Angola as Africa's largest oil producer. The reduced oil output has hampered the Nigerian economy and destroyed its budget, since Nigeria depends on the oil industry for nearly all its government revenues.

The NDA's stated that their aims are to create a sovereign state in the Niger Delta and have threatened to disrupt Nigeria's economy if their aims are not met. The NDA claims its members are "young, educated, well travelled...and educated in east Europe". The group criticised the President of Nigeria, Muhammadu Buhari, for having never visited the delta and his detention of the Biafran independence activist Nnamdi Kanu.

== Organization ==
The leadership of the organization is not understood, as many local leaders have acted as the spokesperson to the government. This has made it difficult for the government to make meaningful contact with the group. Nigerian officials are also disorganized when speaking with the members, as many have found it their duty to make contact.

Additionally, many Niger Delta militant groups have sprung up in the wake of the NDA’s 2016 actions. These copycat organization have contested claims to various act against numerous oil companies originally attributed to the NDA. The most prominent of these splinter groups has been the Reformed Niger Delta Avengers (RNDA), whose similarity of name has caused confusion both inside and outside the country but is not affiliated with the NDA.

== Timeline of activities ==
=== 2016 ===
- January 14 - Several gas pipelines and oil installations located in Warri South West were blown up following orders issued by a Nigerian High Court in Lagos to arrest the ex-militant leader Government Ekpemupolo.
- February 10 - At approximately 1:30 am NDA militants blew up the Bonny-Soku Gas Export Line.
- February 14 - NDA militants destroyed Shell's underwater Forcados 48-inch Export Pipeline at the Forcados Export Terminal.
- February 19 - At approximately 3:30 am NDA militants blew up Eni's Clough Creek-Tebidaba Pipeline in Bayelsa State.
- May 4 - NDA militants attacked and heavily damaged the Chevron Valve Platform located at Abiteye, Warri South. This platform is reportedly Chevron's most significant platform as it serves as a connecting point where all of Chevron's other Niger Delta platforms link-up.
- May 4 - Shell's underwater Forcados 48-inch Export Pipeline was once again blown up by militants shortly after repairs commenced following the February 14 attack.
- May 5 - The Escravos-Lagos Pipeline System, linking Warri to Lagos was blown up by NDA militants.
- May 5 - The NDA's Strike Team 4 launched a coordinated attack on several Chevron oil installations located in Abiteye, resulting in the destruction of Chevron Well D25 and several other major pipelines in the area.
- May 6 - The crude oil pipeline linking Warri to Kaduna was blown up by the NDA's Strike Team 7 as well as a gas line that supplies both Lagos and Abuja with electricity.
- May 6 - Oil pipelines located near the villages of Alero, Dibi, Otunana, and Makaraba were blown up the NDA's Strike Team 7.
- May 9 - 3 Nigerian soldiers were killed during a shootout with NDA militants in the village of Foropa, Southern Ijaw LGA, Bayelsa.
- May 13 - The Chevron pipeline at Makaraba was blown up for a second time in 7 days following repairs done by Chevron.
- May 20 - The Escravos-Lagos Pipeline System was once again blown up by NDA militants following the commencement of repairs being done on the pipeline following the May 5 attack.
- May 25 - NDA militants blew up Chevron's main electricity feed pipeline, located at the Escravos Tank Farm at Ciera Creek.
- May 27 - At approximately 2:15 am NDA militants blew Eni and Shell's pipelines 1, 2, and 3 located at Nembe, Bayelsa State.
- May 27 - At approximately 11:45 pm NDA militants blew up several gas and oil pipelines belong to the Nigerian National Petroleum Corporation located near Warri.
- May 30 - NDA militants were forced to retreat from the villages of Gulobokri and Eweleso, Brass following a series of clashes with Nigerian soldiers, resulting in the deaths of approximately 20 civilians, 2 police officers, and an unknown number of militants/Nigerian soldiers.
- May 31 - At approximately 3:44 am Chevron's Oil Wells RMP23 and RMP24 located near the village of Dibi, Warri South-West, Chevron's highest producing wells in the Niger Delta, were blown up by NDA militants.
- June 1 - Five boats loaded with heavily armed militants attacked a houseboat near the village of Ijere, Warri South, where Nigerian soldiers were reportedly stationed. 2 Nigerian soldiers and 4 civilians were killed during the attack. The NDA claims they were not behind the attack and stated they will "bring the culprits to book".
- June 2 - At approximately 2:00 am NDA militants blew up the Ogboinbiri-Tebidaba and Cough Creek-Tebidaba pipelines, belonging to Eni, in Bayelsa State.
- June 3 - At approximately 3:00 am NDA militants blew up Shell's Forcados 48-inch Export Pipeline for a third time following a series of repairs done by Royal Dutch Shell.
- June 3 - At approximately 3:30 am NDA militants blew up Eni's Brass-Tebidaba oil pipeline in Bayelsa State.
- June 8 - At approximately 1:00 am NDA militants blew up Chevron's Well RMP20, located 20 meters from the Dibi Flow Station in Warri North LGA.
- June 9 - At approximately 8:00 pm NDA militants blew up the Chanomi Creek oil facility, belonging to Royal Dutch Shell, near the village of Ogidigben, Warri South West.
- June 10 - At approximately 3:00 am NDA militants blew up the Obi Obi Brass trunk line, belonging to Eni. It is one of Eni's most significant crude oil pipelines in Bayelsa State.
- June 16 - At approximately 4:00 am NDA militants blew up a crude oil pipeline belonging to the Nigerian National Petroleum Corporation in Oruk Anam LGA, Akwa Ibom.
- July 1 - At approximately 9:15 pm NDA militants blew up a crude oil trunk line belonging to the Nigerian National Petroleum Corporation linked to the Warri refinery.
- July 2 - At approximately 11:26 pm an NDA "Strike Team" blew up two major crude oil trunk lines belonging to the Nigerian Petroleum Development Company, located near the Batan flow station in Delta State.
- July 3 - At approximately 1:15 am NDA militants blew up Chevron Wells 7 and 8, located near the Abiteye flow station in Warri South West LGA.
- July 5 - At approximately 10:00 pm NDA militants blew up Chevron Well 10, located near the Otunana flow station.
- July 5 - At approximately 11:15 pm NDA militants blew up a manifold belonging to the Nigerian Petroleum Development Company, located near Banta, as well as two crude oil trunk lines belonging to the Nigerian National Petroleum Company.
- July 6 - Between the hours of 10:50 pm and 11:10 pm an NDA "strike team" blew up Chevron manifolds RMP 22, 23 and 24 in Delta State. These manifolds are major convergence points for numerous crude oil pipelines operated by Chevron Corp.
- July 8 - Between the hours of 3:00 am and 5:00 am NDA militants blew up Nembe pipelines 1, 2, and 3, belonging to Shell and Eni, in Bayelsa State while simultaneously blowing up the Brass-Tebidaba trunk line in Rivers State.
- July 11 - At approximately 7:30 pm NDA militants blew up ExxonMobil's "Qua Iboe 48" crude oil pipeline.
- July 12 - Late on the night of July 12, NDA militants blew up a natural gas pipeline belonging to the Nigerian National Petroleum Corporation located in Ogijo, Ogun State.
- July 13 - Heavily armed NDA militants hosted a function in Delta State in which they came face-to-face with soldiers of the Nigerian Army. One militant announced "I want to hand over our request to our Ogba Pata today. You'll go and give it to the governor." before telling a Nigerian officer the group's demands. After the short speech, the crowd was wild with jubilation as the militants began shooting their assault rifles in the air while singing and dancing to the song "Fada Fada" by Phyno ft. Olamide.
- July 18 - At approximately 12:05 am NDA militants blew up a crude oil trunk line belonging to Shell located near the Batan Flow Station in Warri South West LGA.
- July 24 - At approximately 11:30 pm NDA militants blew up a natural gas pipeline belonging to the Nigerian National Petroleum Corporation located in Nsit-Ibom LGA, Akwa Ibom.
- July 31 - At approximately 1:00 am militants blew up the Trans Ramos crude oil pipeline, owned by Royal Dutch Shell, located near the village of Odimodi, Burutu LGA, Delta State.
- August 30 - The Nigerian Army announced the commencement of military operations against militants in the Niger Delta, nicknamed Operation Crocodile Smiles.
- August 30 – September 3 - 20 Nigerian soldiers were killed in action by heavily armed NDA militants during the first 4 days of "Operation Crocodile Smiles", 16 were killed along the River Ethiope while the other 4 were killed in the creeks of Bayelsa State.
- September 10 - The Niger Delta Avengers released a photograph showing 4 freshly captured Nigerian Army soldiers being rowed in a boat manned by a single militant to an undetermined location somewhere in the Niger Delta creeks.
- September 23 - At approximately 8:40 pm NDA militants blew up the Bonny 48-inch crude oil pipeline, owned by Royal Dutch Shell, located at the Bonny Export Terminal.
- October 25 - At approximately 3:45 am the NDA Strike Team 06 blew up the Escravos Export Pipeline, owned by Chevron Corporation, located offshore from the mainland. Prior to its destruction, the pipeline transported hundreds-of-thousands of barrels of crude oil each day from offshore oil fields to the Escravos GTL petroleum refineries, located on the mainland, to be refined into gasoline, kerosene, and diesel fuel. The NDA spokesman, Mudoch Agbinibo, warns that any attempt to make repairs to the pipeline will immediately halt their peace negotiations with the Nigerian government.
- November 7 - On the night of November 7 heavily armed NDA militants attacked a group of Nigerian surveillance personnel in charge of securing the Forcados Export Pipeline near the village of Batan, Delta State. Reports state that militants in speedboats opened fire on the surveillance personnel with assault rifles and machine guns, forcing them to flee for their lives. The militants then sped off into the creeks without detonating any explosives.
- November 8 - At approximately 10:45 pm the NDA Strike Team 06 blew up the Forcados Export Pipeline less than 24 hours after their attack on Nigerian surveillance personnel in Batan. Locals reported feeling the shock-wave of the blast followed by the sight of huge fireball that could be seen for kilometres around. The NDA spokesman, Mudoch Agbinibo, says that it is yet another warning to oil corporations not to repair blown pipelines.
- November 15 - At approximately 11:45 pm the NDA Strike Team 03 blew up the Nembe 01, 02, and 03 crude oil pipelines, operated by Eni, Oando, and Royal Dutch Shell. The 3 major pipelines supplied the Bonny Export Terminal, located in Bayelsa State, with 300,000 barrels of crude oil everyday prior to their destruction. NDA spokesman Mudoch Agbinibo stated that these attacks are in response to the Nigerian military's so-called "Operation Sharkbite", launched on November 4.

=== 2017 ===
- November 4 – NDA spokesman Murdoch Agbinibo stated that the NDA will withdraw from the Pan Niger-Delta Forum (PANDEF) and end the cease fire agreement with the federal government. The NDA also took the opportunity to disavow any connection with the RNDA and questioned their legitimacy.

=== 2018 ===
- January 17 – last official update on the official Niger Delta Avengers website.

=== 2019 ===
- NDA endorses presidential candidate Alhaji Atiku Aububakar over the incumbent, President Muhammadu Buhari. Aububakar vowed to increase the amount of oil revenue to the delta region as well as increase its standard of living. While President Buhari won the re-election, the NDA has not responded or retaliated.
