= Ekpetiama tribe =

Ijaw ethnic clan

The Ekpetiama clan of the Ijaw ethnic group lives in central Bayelsa State, Nigeria. The clan derives its name from its common ancestor: Ekpeti. Tombia is the clan preeminent town. Other settlements include: Bumodi, Agudama, Akabiri, and Gbarantoru. The Ekpetiama clan holds an annual festival honoring its clan god, Amadosu. Tombia and Bumodi both have shrines honoring Amadosu. The governor of Bayelsa State Governor, Douye Diri gave automatic scholarship to Ebizi Blessing Eradiri for her Master and Doctorate degrees in any university in Nigeria or abroad. These event was honour by the Ibenanaowei of Ekpetiama Kingdom, King Bubaraye Dakolo.

== Significant events ==
- The Okolede festival is celebrated by the people of thile clan each year in celebration of the "new yam".
- 23 July 2007: Gunmen kidnapped the 70-year-old mother of Hansel Seibarugu, the Speaker of the Bayelsa State House of Assembly. She was kidnapped from her home in the Ekpetiama village of Akaibiri in Yenagoa Local Government Area.
