= Iduwini tribe =

Nigerian tribe

The Iduwini tribe of the Ijaw people lives along the Atlantic coast of southwestern Delta State and northwestern Bayelsa State, Nigeria. Important Iduwini settlements include Amatu and Orobiri.

The Iduwini Volunteer Force (IVF), a militant group made up of some clan members, conducted kidnappings and other attacks on local oil company targets in 2006.
