= Eastern Apoi tribe =

The Eastern Apoi tribe of the Ijaw people is located in central Bayelsa State, Nigeria. The Eastern Apoi tribe is small and geographically isolated. Apoi settlements include: Keme-ebiama, Kolokologbene, Ogboinbiri, Sampou, Gbaran, Kassama, and Azama. Migrants from the Eastern Apoi clan established the Western Apoi clan in Ondo State hundreds of years ago. Also, the Arogbo tribe traces its origins to a migration from the Apoi town of Gbaran.

== Significant events ==
- 17 June 2007: 12 Nigerian soldiers are taken hostage when militants invade AGIP's Ogboinbiri flow station. Earlier, soldiers deployed to protect the facility killed nine youths in the area, provoking a reprisal attacks by the youths.
- 28 July 2006: Youths from Ogboinbiri village hold 8 soldiers and 16 civilians hostage in at AGIP's Ogboinbiri flow station. They stormed the Ogboinbiri platform of the firm in speedboats, chased off soldiers on guard duty, and seized the soldiers rifles. They vowed not to release the captives until AGIP honored its agreement to provide jobs for youths of the area. They also demanded the return four speedboats previously seized by AGIP at Ikeibiri.
