= Buseni tribe =

Tribe in Nigeria

The Biseni tribe (Biseni) lives in central Bayelsa State, Nigeria. It is a small tribe bordered by the Gbaran to the north and by the Zarama and Okordia clans to the northeast. Buseni dialects represent Southeast Ijo (Izon). And it is considered Inland Ijo.

== Significant events ==
- June 2002: Soldiers deployed to villages in Buseni territory following an ownership dispute between a Buseni family and AGIP over the ownership of an oil well project.
- December 2001: 10 people were killed during violent clashes between the Okordia and Buseni clans. The violence was sparked by the earlier death of a Buseni youth. Some members of the Buseni clan ambushed Okordia clan members as they returned from working in the fields.
