= Ogbe (name) =

Ogbe or Ogbeh is a surname and given name. Notable people with the name include:

- Ogbe Abraha (born 1948), Eritrean politician
- Audu Ogbeh (1947–2025), Nigerian playwright and politician
- Kenneth Ogbe (born 1994), German basketball player
