= Pro-Natura International =

Pro-Natura International (PNI) is an environmental and poverty alleviation NGO working in developing countries. Founded by Dr Marcello de Andrade in Brazil in 1985, it was internationalised in 1992 by French engineer Guy Reinaud following the Rio Conference.

PNI has specialised in the production and use of biochar, an agro-ecological technology for soil fertility and carbon sequestration.
