= Utagba-Ogbe (Kwale) =

Coordinates: 5°43′52.4″N 6°24′45.2″E

- Interactive map of Utagba-Ogbe
- Country: Nigeria
- Time zone: UTC+1 (WAT)

Utagba-Ogbe was a systematic settlement in Nigeria of Utagba-Uno soldiers who went to fight the Agha Ashaka (1750 AD). The battlefield was near hence it was so called. Therefore, it should not be mistaken to be war with Ashaka. The exact date of war is not certain but some elders say that their fathers told them that their grandfathers were not born at the time of the war. A member of a family in Utagba-Ogbe could name six (6) of his grandparents who had lived at Utagba-Ogbe. Utagba Uno witnessed incessant aggressions from clans along the Ase river either trying to find a place uplands or to intimidate an old settlement like Utagba-Uno. It is said that there were no other settlement then between Utagba-Uno and the present Utagba-Ogbe except Onicha-Ukwuani clan at the corner. So, the purpose of the settlement at Utagba-Ogbe was not territorial but was based on military expediency.
