= Boma tribe =

Nigerian tribe

The Boma tribe (Bumo) of the Ijaw people live in Bayelsa State, Nigeria. The thirteen Bumo settlements are: Diebu, Ekowe, Emette, Eniwari, Fonibiri, Igbematoru, Ikianbiri, Kainyanbiri, Ozezebiri, Peremabiri, Polobugo and Seibiri (also known as Opuama).

Their Boma identity derives from their tradition of common origin and a common dialect of Ijo.

== Brief history of Boma tribe (Bumo) ==
Boma individuals came from Obiama. Obiama itself was established by Obi of obscure beginning. The town involved a few wards and compounds which chased a wan(duiker) for a yearly custom gala. Individuals were given a portion of the meat particularly of the soup (wan fulo) which was thought to give richness. One ward deceitfully drank all the soup. During the debate that followed, two of Obi's sons Boma and Tarakiri moved out to frame present-day Boma ibe and Tarakiri ibe. As indicated by Ekowe witnesses, the twelve part settlements of Boma ibe were established by twelve children of Boma. Ekeu, author of Ekowe town, being the senior. Besides, the authors of the five unique mixtures of Ekowe itself were children of Ekea, specifically;

- Ikai of Ipainpolo
- Igula of Igulapolo
- Ikitibo of Ikitibobiri(disappeared)
- Okposio of Ogbobiri & Opusumo of Tamakunu.

These smoothed out lineages are, improbable to address the entire image of the arrangement of Buma ibe. There are equal practices of certain towns being established by workers from outside.

Along these lines witnesses Ologoama or Otokoroama recorded Peremabiri as a spot established by a child of their precursor, Okoroma. The drum acclaim title, Okoromabiri, given by the Peremabiri themselves, was referred to at Ologoama as proof of the relationship. Also, customs at Amassoma (Ogboin ibe) guaranteed Ikianbiri (Boma ibe) to have relocated from that point they were. Boma sources clarified that, the transients who came from Otuan (Ogboin ibe) were people who had recently scattered from a prior Boma settlement, obviously likewise named Ikianbiri.

=== Internal organization ===
Aside from the normal lingo and the practices of normal beginning from Obiama there have been no normal foundations among the Boma ibe. Since there was no normal god loved by all members, not even an emblematic strict head was accessible. The Boma didn't have an image of solidarity in a kule or drum acclaim name recognized by all part networks. In view of the resultant complete independence of the part towns,& albeit all originators are professed to be children of Boma. Diebu questioned status with Ekowe.

=== External organization ===
Moreso, different towns set up affiliations with outside networks. Peremabiri, for example says their god Pinaoru, came all alone from Aboh. What's more, the god, Ekine of Seibiri, is accepted to be identified with Ogidiga, national lord of Nembe. These customs of strict connection infer social contacts.

There are likewise customs of populace developments out of or through the Boma region. The towns of Oruokolo (Nembe) and kamatoru or Sangana (Akassa ibe) are expressed to have gotten transients from Igbematoru and Boma. At Ekowe.it was guaranteed that an Isoko town of a similar name at the top of the delta had moved from the Boma, Ekowe. Boma history, then, was not a basic matter of "children" of the progenitor passing on Obiama to establish towns to shape ibe(clan). There were developments in and out of the area, as well as social and business contacts with adjoining people groups.
