= Bassan tribe =

The Bassan tribe (Basan) of the Ijaw people lives in western Bayelsa State, Nigeria. Bassan settlements include: Ezetu (I and II), Koluama (I and II), Sangana, Foropah, Ukubie, Lubia, Azuzuama, Akparatubo, and Ekeni.

Unlike other Ijaw tribes, the Bassan do not have a cultural tradition of common origin. It is believed that each of the villages that make up the clan were settled by separate migrations. As a result, no form of central authority developed among the Bassan. Some of the villages forged temporary alliances; others quarreled with each other over land and fishing rights.

== Significant events ==
- 2 November 2006: Gunmen kidnap two expatriates (British and American) working for Petroleum Geo-Services (working on contract for Chevron Nigeria Limited). The gunmen claim to have acted on behalf of the Ezetu community, a village near Chevron's Funiwa platform. The community demand that Chevron give them jobs and build a local hospital.
  According to a Bayelsa government negotiator, contrary to the belief in Yenagoa, the community was actually responsible for the attack. In his words: "When I got to Ezetu 1 community, contrary to what we were made to believe, after a meeting with the people it was made clear to me that the community had sent the youths to take the workers. The community has taken responsibility of the hostage incident".
- 1 November 2005: Women from several Bassan communities (Koluama I and II, Ekeni, Forupa, Fishtown, Ezetu I and II and Sangana - also known as the KEFFES communities) conducted a three-day protest outside of Chevron's liaison office in Yenagoa. The women were protesting what they described as Chevron's "insensitivity to their plight".
- 15 November 2004: Bassan youths kidnap six expatriates working for Conoil Limited, an oil services firm. The hostages were held at Sangana in Brass Local Government Area (LGA). Angry youths took over Conoil's facilities following the breakdown of employment negotiations with the company's management.
- 19 November 2003: Thirty-plus youths from several Bassan communities (Koluama I and II, Ezetu I and II, Foropah, Fishtown, Ekeni and Sangama) invade two Chevron platforms where they held several expatriates and other workers hostage.

== Oil company host communities ==
- Ekeni, Ezetu (I and II) are host communities for Peak Petroleum.
- Sangana, Fish Town, Ezetu (I and II), Kolokuama (I and II) are Chevron-Texaco host communities.

Santana is not a member Community of Bassan Clan, it is a member Community of Akassa Clan in Brass Local Govt Area of Bayelsa State.
