= Tompolo =

Ex-militant Leader

Oweizidei Thomas Ekpemupolo
- Born: Oweizide Thomas Ekpemupolo; April 12, 1971 (age 55); Okerenkoko, Delta, Nigeria
- Known for: Activism for the emancipation of the Niger Delta Region Leader of Woyin Religion

Oweizidei Thomas Ekpemupolo, also known as Tompolo, is a religious leader of the Woyin Religion, an indigenous belief system of the Ijaw people. He was a former leader of the Movement for the Emancipation of the Niger Delta (MEND), influenced by the Egbesu Deity, which represents truth, fairness, and equity - an alternate name for Woyin. Tompolo and his followers participated in the Niger Delta arm struggle for the emancipation of the region.

His nickname "Tompolo" was derived from his father's name, Chief Thomas Osen Ekpemupolo. Specifically, "Thomas" was shortened to "Tom" and "Ekpemupolo" was shortened to "Polo", resulting in the nickname "Tompolo".

== Early life ==
Tompolo was born in 1971 to a royal family in Okerenkoko, the traditional Gbaramatu Kingdom, Warri South West Local Government Area in Delta State. Ekpemupolo had his basic education at Okepopo Primary School in Warri.

== Activism and militancy ==
In 1993, Tompolo dropped out of college and joined a resistance group in the Niger Delta. In 1998, Tompolo joined the newly formed Ijaw Youth Council and became a well respected member. Since there was very little progress in the Ijaw Youth Council, Tompolo joined the Movement for the Emancipation of the Niger Delta. Tompolo's invitation to Mujahid Dokubo-Asari, leader of the Niger Delta People's Volunteer Force (NDPVF) to take refuge in Delta state in 2005 helped precipitate the formation of MEND soon afterwards. Ekpemupolo quickly rose to a high commander in MEND and with his vast wealth he was able to supply MEND with large amounts of weapons and new equipment. Tompolo was in command of thousands of militants and was very successful in attacking the insensitivity of the government and the Multinational oil companies to the exploitation and degradation of the peoples and environments of the Niger Delta.

For years Tompolo was a commander in various guerrilla groups in the Niger Delta which were all agitating against their perceived insensitivity of the federal government and the international oil companies towards to exploitation and degradation of the Niger Delta.

== Amnesty ==
During his time as a guerrilla commander, he, under the auspices of MEND was able to drive the Nigerian government to grant amnesty to MEND members who decided to surrender. Tompolo was granted full amnesty as well as all of his men when he embraced the amnesty offer on the Federal Government of Nigeria under president Umaru Musa Yar'Adua on June 27, 2009. Tompolo embraced amnesty on October 4, 2009, in order to allow for peace in the area, and for the government and oil companies to carry out development projects, and provide jobs and training.

=== Arrest warrant ===
In January 2016, under the regime of the Muhammadu Buhari government, an arrest warrant for Tompolo was issued on charges of theft and money laundering. Prior this, his last public appearance was in 2014 and for six years his location and whereabouts were clandestine until 2020 when he resurfaced in his Egbesu shrine. In August 2022, Muhammadu Buhari renewed a lucrative contract to monitor the Delta region pipelines with Tompolo.

== Personal life ==
Tompolo is a traditionalist and is the chief priest of the Egbesu deity, which is the god of war in the Ijaw tribe.
