= Kumbo tribe =

Nigerian tribe

The Kumbo tribe (Kumbowei) of the Izon people lives in southern Delta State and northern Bayelsa State, Nigeria. The major town of Sagbama is the tribal seat. Other important Kumbo settlements include: Agoloma, Apeleibiri, Angiama. Despite being located close to one another, Kumbo towns enjoy a great deal of autonomy from central tribal authority.
