= Arogbo tribe =

Nigerian ethnic group

The Arogbo Izon people "are a clan or sub-ethnic group of the larger Izon Nation in Nigeria. Izon Nation is one of the largest ethnic groups in the Niger Delta natural region. They are very valiant and courageous folks. They are domiciled in the southeastern part of present-day Ondo State from about the 9th century A.D. The Arogbo Izon Ibe covers over one hundred and twenty (120) Izon towns and villages with headquarters at Arogbo Town.

Historically, the Arogbo Izon, a very warlike people, have had trading contacts with neighboring Ijaw groups Western Apoi, Egbema and the Ijebu and Ilaje Yoruba. Most Arogbo are bilingual, speaking dialects of both the Yoruba and Ijaw languages. The Arogbo Izon acted as middle men in the slave trade, selling captives from the interior to Europeans. The Freedom Post was erected at Arogbo Town in 1885. The Arogbo Izon hosted Nana Olomu in protection against colonialists who declared the Itsekiri chief wanted. They resisted the colonial authorities successfully. The Arogbo Izon have never been defeated in any war. They always rise above trials. Traditionally, the Arogbo Izon encourage intra-tribal marriages amongst themselves and other Izon subgroups to sustain their culture and heritage. The Arogbo migrated to their present location from the town of Gbaran in the central Niger Delta. Worship of the god Egbesu is particularly strong among the Arogbo Izon.

The founding ancestors of the Arogbo were part of the same migration from Ujo-Gbaraun town. After a brief stop at Oproza, led by Eji and his younger brother, Perebiyenmo and sister, Fiyepatei, they went on to Ukparomo (now occupied by the towns of Akpata, Opuba, Ajapa, and Ukpe). They stayed here for some time, about the length of the reign of two Agadagbas (military priest-rulers of the shrine of Egbesu). They then moved to the present site of Arogbo, from this place their descendants spread out to found the Arogbo Ibe. It was from Arogbo that some ancestors migrated northwards up the old course of the Forçados River and settled near the site of Patani. Living nearby in the upland region were proto Edo or Efa people called Erowha. These ancestors later on intermarried with them and gave birth to the Uvwei and Effurun (Efferun or Efferu the ancestor of the Effurun or Ephron was a descendant of Gbaran) sections of Urhobo people . During the time of the expansion of the Benin kingdom (1550), Benin invaded Ukoruama (Lagos). The Arogbo Izon sent soldiers to defend the Ijo living in that region. Their army camp became known as Idumu-Arogbo later shortened to U. The Arogbo Izon also successfully halted the advance of the Benin army into the western delta and subsequently the whole of the Izon Ibe. The foundation of the Arogbo Ebe is clearly pre-11th century AD. The ancestors of the Arogbo lived at Ujo-Gbaraun between 872 – 994 AD. Along with the ancestors of the Gbaramatu and Tuomo they moved to the Escravos region, while the Arogbo Izon ancestors moved further west.

== Notable people ==
- Chief Richard Aiyetowonwo Jolowo (Lawyer, Speaker Ondo State House of Assembly 1979–1983)
- Justice Christopher Ajama
