= Isaba tribe =

Isoun who is the founder of Isaba Kingdom, migrated from Oporomor to Amabulou in the present Ekeremor local government area of Bayelsa State, about the 14th century.

Isoun and all his descendants are direct and bonafide members of the Bumoubiri quarters of the Amabulou community in the Ekeremor local government area of Bayelsa State.

He (Isoun) later migrated from there and founded the first Isaba settlement, named Isaba-utugbo and from there he crossed the Isaba river and founded Ogbetu, Igbaregba, Tobo-ama-Isaba and finally Isaba at a time beyond human history.

The descendants and followers of Isoun later founded and settled at various places including Ayama, Pamien, Orubeke, Pere-ama”, the traditional headquarters of Isaba Kingdom and a host of other villages. When Isoun and his descendants migrated to this area(Isaba), it was a complete Virgin land, never inhabited by human being on earth. The People of Isaba from time immemorial have exercised full proprietary and possessory right of ownership without interference.

Being an uninhabited land, Isoun decedents brushed the virgin land land in so doing, they cut down a huge tree that sprawled across the immediate vicinity which they settled upon, necessitating them to cross over the fallen tree each time they passed from one side of the said vicinity to the other.

It is this act of crossing over that, later became known as Isaba in Ijo (Ijaw) language. However, it has expanded to include many acreage (hectare) over time. Isoun was the first king (Pere) and ancestor of Isaba thus the founder of Isaba Kingdom.

RULING HOUSES OF ISABA KINGDOM

1. Akori Ruling House 2. Ogbobere Ruling House 3. Imgbile Ruling House 4. Okoro Ruling House 5. Tukpa Ruling House 6. Oviuama Ruling House

HISTORY OF THE THRONE OF ISABA KINGDOM

1. HRM Pere Isoun – The Pere and Founder of Isaba Kingdom (1480-1582) – 102 years reign.

2. HRM Pere Akori – The Pere of Isaba Kingdom (1582-1679) – 97 years reign (The interregnum for 185 years) 3. Prince Giobirimor – Pere designate of Isaba Kingdom (1864) – Interregnum for 33 years. 4. HRM Pere Donokoromor Iyetimiware (1897-1962) – 62 years reign (Interregnum for 21 years)

5. HRM Pere Deimowuru Donokoromor (JP) – The Pere of Isaba Kingdom (1983-2018l – 35 years reign (Interregnum for 5 years).

6. HRM Pere Theophilus Ndorokeme Isegbele, Ogbobere Isoun VI – Crowned Tuesday, May 23, 2023 and Staff of Office presented by the Delta State Government on Wednesday, May 24, 2023.
