= Egbema tribe =

Egbema, also known as Egbema Kingdom, is a traditional kingdom spanning parts of Edo and Delta states in southern Nigeria. Its communities share a common language, cultural traditions and a traditional institution headed by the Agadagba of Egbema.

== History ==
The kingdom developed through successive migrations and the establishment of settlements in the western Niger Delta. Oral traditions identify Ofiniama as its earliest settlement. Egbema's history includes trade and political relations with the Benin Kingdom to the north, Itsekiri communities to the south, and European traders operating along the Benin River and its estuaries.

== Settlements ==
The kingdom comprises nine original settlements, collectively known as the Egbema-Isenabiri:

1. Ajakurama
2. Ofiniama
3. Opuama
4. Ogbudugbudu
5. Gbeoba
6. Abere
7. Abadigbene (Bolou-Jamagie)
8. Jamagie
9. Ogbinbiri
