= Gbaran tribe =

The Gbaraun tribe of the Izon people lives along Taylor Creek ("Gbaraun toru") in central Bayelsa State, Nigeria. Gbaraun settlements include: Okotiama, Polaku, Obunagha, Ogboloma, Nedugo, Agbia, kumboama, Okolobiri, Koroama, Ayama, Tuniama and Asaingbene. Okotiama is the senior community. The close proximity of Gbaraun villages along Taylor Creek has helped them maintain their shared cultural traditions. The clan god is Reborn Ziba.

Gbaraun is actually a clan occupying the villages mentioned above. The Gbaraun people are part of the Izon (Ijaw) ethnic nationality. Gbaraun was founded by a man called Gbaraunowei, son of Oporoza the son of Izon. Gbaraunowei's brothers are Kunbowei and Kabowei in Sagbama Local Government Area of Bayelsa State in Nigeria. The Gbaraun people speak a dialect Izon. Their occupations, like other of Izon groups, include fishing, farming, canoe-carving, hunting, lumbering and palm oil production.

== Significant events ==
- 11 April 2008: Youths from Gbaran clan in Yenagoa disrupted operations at the Etelebou flow station owned by the Shell Petroleum Development Company (SPDC). The action followed alleged non-implementation of a Global Memorandum of Understanding (GMOU) the company entered into with the host communities. The youths stormed the flow station and chased out the oil workers including the expatriate workers.
