= Western Apoi tribe =

The Western Ijaw Apoi tribe (Izon) live in Ondo and Edo States, Nigeria. The Western Apoi tribe are also called Apoi or Ijo-Apoi. They consists of nine settlements namely Igbekebo, Igbotu, Igbobini, Inikorogha, Ipoke, Kiribo, Oboro, Ojuala and Shabomi. The Apois inhabit higher ground than most of the other Ijaw tribes. They speak a dialect of the Yoruba language called Apoi which is similar to the Ikale and Ilaje dialect. The Apois' underwent a linguistic shift centuries ago from an Ijo based dialect to Yoruba due to intermarriages and isolation from the larger delta region. They are bordered to the north and east by the Ikale and to the west and partially southwards by the Ilaje. The clan shares the other section of their southern border with the Arogbo.

== Notable people ==
The Apoi (also known as Apoi-Ijaw) people have produced several notable individuals who have contributed to the development of their communities, Ondo State, and Nigeria at large.

- Omoyele Sowore (born 1971), from Kiribo, is a Nigerian human rights activist, journalist, and politician. He is the founder of Sahara Reporters, an online news platform known for investigative reporting on governance and corruption in Nigeria. He founded the African Action Congress (AAC) in 2018 and was its presidential candidate in the 2019 and 2023 Nigerian general elections.
- Alice Mobolaji Osomo (born 23 June 1936), from Igbotu in Ese-Odo Local Government Area of Ondo State, is a Nigerian lawyer, administrator, and politician. She served as Commissioner for Trade, Industries and Cooperatives in Ondo State from 1979 to 1983, and later as Minister of Establishment and Management Services (1993–1995) and Minister of Housing, Lands and Urban Development (2003–2005).
- Gabriel Akinola Deko (30 October 1913 – 5 November 1987) had maternal roots in Igbotu. was a Nigerian building contractor and politician who served as Regional Minister for Agriculture in the Western Region of Nigeria. He was associated with agricultural settlement policies aimed at encouraging trained graduates to engage in farming.
- Rotimi Akeredolu (1956–2023), former Governor of Ondo State, had maternal roots in Igbotu. His mother, Lady Evangelist Grace Abosede Akeredolu, was from Igbotu in Ese-Odo Local Government Area.

== Society and culture ==
Originally, the Apoi lived along the sides of shallow creeks where they engaged in fishing, canoe building and transporting goods and forestry products such as timber logs by water between their villages and other towns. They also engage in farming.

=== Traditional belief ===
The chief deity among the Apoi is the Oborowe whose main shrine is situated at Igbobini between Okitipupa and Irele. Water deities called kesimotie are prominent in Inikorogha, while the main deity and celebration in Igbekebo is Boabo (or Boabu), a tree god, and a form of divination called patagha.

Esidale, the deity of the Earth at Ife, is prominent, and the Oro celebration is widely practiced and acknowledged among the Apois.

== Origin and migration ==
The Apoi people trace their origin to a migration from the Central Niger Delta in present day Bayelsa State and further to an early migration from Ile-Ife. Prior to arriving at their present location, tribal traditions recall a long period of settlement at Okomu in Okomu kingdom, Ovia South-West Local Government Area, Edo State.

The Apoi took their name from Apoi (Opoi) the son of Kala-Okun, who accompanied his grandfather Ujo on their way back to Otu-Ife or Ile-Ife. In a group of nine, they got lost in trying to trace the route back without the aid of a navigator. So, they decided to settle within the vicinity of the Nun River (Apoi creek), where the present village of Apoi is situated. Ujo who bore the title Kalasuwe (KALA-SUWE or KALUSUWE i.e., small god,), died here and his grandson inherited the title.

Subsequently, Kalasuwe became a royal title passing through the family lineage of Apoi. The nine lineages formed out of the migrating group founded nine quarters (Idumu), of which only five are remembered, these include, Ogboinbou, Apoi, Okoto-aza or Okoto-aja (the original home of Kalasuwe or Ujo himself and the site of one of his ancestral shrines called Oborowei), Umgbuluama, and Inikorogha. Some descendants of Gbaran migrated from Gbaran settlement within the same area, and with the Apoi founded the villages of Keme-Ebiama, Ajama or Azama, Kassama, and Ogboinbiri, Kolokologbene, and Sampou. Together with Gbaran town, these have collectively become known as Apoi Ibe.

The western Apoi who derived from the Okoto-aja or Okotoaza, Umgbuluama, Apoi and other Idumu’s, migrating with the royal family first settled at Okomu in Edo State at the time in the western Niger Delta, They stayed here for a long period of time but had to leave due to the activities of soldiers from the Benin empire (this was the time of the expansion of the Benin empire 1500 AD onwards).Most of the ancestors left Okomu and moved on westwards to found the town of Akpaka. After the reign of Five Kalasuwes (approx. 150-200 years), a gradual process of dispersal set in causing the founding of the towns of Igbobini, Igbotu, Oboro, Ojuala (Oju-Ala), Gbekebo and Kiribo. The royal family moved from Akpaka to found Toru-Abukuba (Apukuba or Opukuba). Later on, Toru-Abukuba became the towns of Oboro and Shabomi.

The Western Apoi call Kalasuo Kalasuwe or Kalashuwe and Oborowi, Oborowe. They no longer speak Ijaw language, but a dialect made up of the fusion of Ijaw and Yoruba due to inter marriage.Of late, they have moved on to adopting the general Yoruba which most of them now speak. At a later stage as part of the Yoruba influence, the rulers took on the Oba title, before switching back to the ancient titles of Kalasuwe. As children of Ujo, at Ile-Ife the ancestral traditions name them as one of the sub-tribes that sprung from King Adumu-Ala (alias Oduduwa). The Apoi are pre-14th century.

Many Apois have begun seeing themselves totally as Yorubas; while some believe that the acculturation has been completed and Apois have now become part and parcel of the larger Yoruba race. Yet, some others say they are Yorubas by virtue of the oral tradition of their migration from Ile-Ife.

The Apoi king is called Oba and the title is Kalasuwe and dual seats of the throne are in Shabomi and Oboro.

Here is the list of Apoi Kings, and the communities they rule over:

- Kalasuwe of Apoi Land – Oba (Prof.) Sunday Adejimola Amuseghan
- Olu of Igbobini – Oba Oyedele Raphael
- Odogun of Igbekebo – Oba Bamidele Dabo
- Gbaluwe of Igbotu – Oba Adeniyi Ajayi
- Alakpaka of Kiribo – Oba Johnson Oduyi Ajayi
- Takunbe of Ikpoke – Oba Hosea Oladapo Julius Fonghon
- Jowe of Inikorogha – Oba M.A. Olasehinde
- Lebu of Ojuala – Oba Charles Adeboye Olajide
- Okiribiti of Shabomi – Oba Felix Adeyemi Koledoye
- Kenme of Oboro – Oba Eyilola Tunde Alabeni

== See also ==
- Eastern Apoi tribe
