= Mein tribe =

The Mein tribe of the Ijaw people lives along the Forcados River in Delta State, Nigeria. The Mein trace their origins to Benin City, via parts of the central Niger Delta. Important Mein settlements include Ogobiri and Kiagbodo.

Most of the Mein live along the Forcados River in Burutu and Bomadi Local Government Areas of Delta state, with Kiagbodo as the most conspicuous settlement. As indicated by Mein customs, the eponymous progenitor, Mein lived at Benin and moved to Aboh to keep away from wars. He then left Aboh because of contentions, and settled at Ogobiri in the Sagbama – Igbedi brook (present-day Bayelsa state). It was from here that further developments happened for the most part because of questions and over-populace, prompting displacements toward the western Delta.
