= Egbesu =

Ijaw deity

Egbesu is the deity of justice of the Ijaw people of the Niger Delta region. Egbesu is also perceived as the spiritual foundational force for combating evil. The Egbesu force can only be used in defence or to correct an injustice, and only by people who are in harmony with the universe. The symbols of the divine force are the leopard, panther, and lion. Egbesu has both a philosophical and spiritual dimension, the latter of which has been more prominent during recent times due to conflicts in regions where the Ijaw reside.

== Beliefs ==
Belief in Egbesu dictates the Ijaw philosophical principles of war and the Egbesu force is believed to be able to provide spiritual attributes to Ijaw fighters. The philosophical aspect incorporates elements of a just war. Egbesu conduct for just wars dictates that the only justified cause of war is self-defence. Therefore, the Egbesu force can only be used to correct an injustice and only by people who are considered in harmony with the universe. Egbesu war ethics also incorporates a reward element, where victors are granted rewards for winning just wars.

Egbesu is also expressed in cultural practices. This includes a hierarchical organization of community members into an Egbesu king (chief priest), high priests (Okparans), followed by other priests and foot soldiers (Kulikuliwei). Chief priests are the only ones allowed to declare war, and only in their absence are Okparans allowed to undertake this duty.

The Egbesu force is also believed to be able to grant spiritual powers to fighters. This includes protection from enemy bullets.

== Current Practices ==
The ancient Egbesu cult of the Ijaws declined after the successful British occupation of the Ijaw lands in the late 19th century. This minimized the prominence of Egbesu for some time and most Ijaws only knew of the deity and its philosophy through folklore and traditional war songs.

However, the Niger Delta conflict, which arose due to tensions between foreign oil corporations and minority ethnic groups in the region, has centered current Egbesu practices around the spiritual defence mechanism Egbesu can provide for the Ijaw people. Oil extraction projects conducted by the Nigerian government and foreign oil corporations often lead to conflict between the two sides as the Ijaw people struggle against state suppression and socioeconomic marginalization.

== Militant Groups ==
The Niger Delta conflict has prompted contempt from many locals, and militant groups have evoked Egbesu war ethics as a way to mobilize and recruit members in the fight against the Nigerian state and the Nigerian petroleum industry. The most important aspect evoked is the protection Egbesu power provides from enemy bullets. In order to receive said protection, groups are supported by mothers of the community, male elders, and priests. Youth militants also use white chalk to paint their faces and place medicated plant leaves on their foreheads for protection.

Groups formed around Egbesu include the Egebesu Boys or the Egbesu Boys of Africa, Red Egbesu Water Lions, Reformed Egbesu Boys of the Niger Delta, and the Egbesu Mightier Fraternity. These groups have both worked with and been in conflict with other groups, with the Egbesu Mightier Fraternity being involved in the 2016 Niger Delta conflict, but have signed a ceasefire as of late August 2016.

=== Egbesu Boys ===
As a response to the Niger Delta conflict, the Egbesu Boys emerged during the early 1990s. The group took up arms to fight against authorities in the Conflict in the Niger Delta in response to environmental and other problems caused by the petroleum industry in Nigeria, including the lack of investment of oil revenue in the local economy. Many young men have joined the cult, undergoing secret initiations by priests who impart the spiritual powers of Egbesu. The initiation involves the subject being etched with cicatrices on some hidden part of the body, and some members also wear amulets. The followers often believe the talisman and the cult initiations make them bulletproof. Reports of their activities include kidnapping of oil workers, sabotage of oil installations, and attacks on Nigerian authorities. However, it is difficult to attribute specific activities to the group due to the presence of multiple other militant groups in the area. The group is active across six southeastern states in the Niger Delta, with their traditional headquarters located in Amabulou, Bayelsa State.
