= List of guerrillas =

List of notable guerrilla activists, ordered by country:

== Afghanistan ==
| Guerrilla leader | Movement | War |
|---|---|---|
| Ahmad Massoud | National Resistance Front of Afghanistan | Panjshir Conflict |
| Ahmed Shah Massoud | Northern Alliance | Soviet–Afghan War |
| Gulbuddin Hekmatyar | Mujahidin | Soviet–Afghan War |
| Mohammed Omar | Taliban | Soviet–Afghan War |
| Osama Bin Laden | Al-Qaeda | Soviet–Afghan War |
| Jalaluddin Haqqani | Haqqani Network | Soviet–Afghan War |

== Albania ==
| Guerrilla leader | Movement | War |
|---|---|---|
| Enver Hoxha | Party of Labor of Albania | Balkans in World War II |
| Skanderbeg | Albanian feudal leader | Albanian-Ottoman war |

== Algeria ==
| Guerrilla leader | Movement | War |
|---|---|---|
| Abdel Kadir | Emirate of Abdelkader | French conquest of Algeria |
| Saadi Yacef | Algerian War | National Liberation Front |
| Ali La Pointe | Algerian War | National Liberation Front |

== Angola ==
| Guerrilla leader | Movement | War |
|---|---|---|
| Jonas Savimbi | UNITA | Angola Civil War |

== Arabia ==
| Guerrilla leader | Movement | War |
|---|---|---|
| T. E. Lawrence | British Army | Arab Revolt |

== Argentina ==
| Guerrilla leader | Movement | War |
|---|---|---|
| Che Guevara | July 26th Movement | Cuban Revolution |
| Enrique Gorriarán Merlo | People's Revolutionary Army | Dirty War |

== Armenia ==
- Fedayi
- Dashnaks
- Hunchaks
- Armenakans

== Assyria ==
| Guerrilla leader | Movement | War |
|---|---|---|
| Malik Khoshaba | Assyrian independence movement | Persian campaign |
| Dawid Mar Shimun | Assyrian independence movement | Persian campaign |
| Agha Petros | Assyrian independence movement | Persian campaign |
| Shimun XIX Benyamin | Assyrian independence movement | Persian campaign |

== Austria ==
| Guerrilla leader | Movement | War |
|---|---|---|
| Andreas Hofer | Schützen militia | Napoleonic Wars |
| Otto Skorzeny | Sonder Lehrgang Oranienburg | World War II |

== Bangladesh ==
| Guerrilla leader | Movement | War |
|---|---|---|
| Kader Siddique | Mukti Bahini | Bangladesh Liberation War |
| Hemayet Uddin | Mukti Bahini | Bangladesh Liberation War |
| Abdul Mannan Bhuiyan | Mukti Bahini | Bangladesh Liberation War |

== Belgium ==
| Guerrilla leader | Movement | War |
|---|---|---|
| Jacob Collaert | Dunkirkers | Dutch Revolt |

== Bolivia ==
| Guerrilla leader | Movement | War |
|---|---|---|
| Tamara Bunke | Ejército de Liberation Nacional de Bolivia | Ñancahuazú Guerrilla |
| Che Guevara | Ejército de Liberation Nacional de Bolivia | Ñancahuazú Guerrilla |
| Osvaldo Peredo | Ejército de Liberation Nacional de Bolivia | Ñancahuazú Guerrilla |

== Brazil ==
| Guerrilla leader | Movement | War |
|---|---|---|
| Anita Garibaldi | Juliana Republic | Ragamuffin War |
| João Amazonas | Araguaia Guerrilla War | Partido Comunista do Brasil |
| Giuseppe Garibaldi | Riograndense Republic | Ragamuffin War |

== Bulgaria ==
| Guerrilla leader | Movement | War |
|---|---|---|
| Kaloyan | Asen dynasty | Uprising of Asen and Peter |

== Cambodia ==
| Guerrilla leader | Movement | War |
|---|---|---|
| Pol Pot | Khmer Rouge | Cambodian Civil War |

== Cameroon ==
| Guerrilla leader | Movement | War |
|---|---|---|
| Osende Afana | Union of the Peoples of Cameroon | Anglophone Crisis |
| Félix Moumié | Union of the Peoples of Cameroon | Anglophone Crisis |
| Ernest Ouandié | Union of the Peoples of Cameroon | Anglophone Crisis |
| Ruben Um Nyobé | Union of the Peoples of Cameroon | Anglophone Crisis |

== Canada ==
- North-West Rebellion
  - Fine-Day
  - Gabriel Dumont
  - Louis Riel
  - Wandering Spirit
- Other
  - "Yank" Levy
  - Charles Deschamps de Boishébert et de Raffetot - Quebec born member of the Compagnies Franches de la Marine who was a leader of the Acadian militia in their resistance to the Expulsion of the Acadians.
  - Sébastien Rale
  - Joseph Broussard - also went by the pseudonym Beausoleil.

== Chad ==
| Guerrilla leader | Movement | War |
|---|---|---|
| Goukouni Oueddei | FROLINAT | Chadian–Libyan War |
| Hissène Habré | FROLINAT | Chadian–Libyan War |
| Ibrahim Abatcha | FROLINAT | Chadian Civil War |
| Idriss Déby | Patriotic Salvation Movement | First Chadian Civil War |
| Rabih az-Zubayr | Sudanese warlord | Rabih War |
| Youssouf Togoïmi | Movement for Democracy and Justice in Chad | Insurgency in Chad |

== Chechnya ==
| Guerrilla leader | Movement | War |
|---|---|---|
| Aslan Maskhadov | Chechen Republic of Ichkeria | First Chechen War |
| Aslan Maskhadov | Chechen Republic of Ichkeria | Second Chechen War |
| Dzhokhar Dudayev | Chechen Republic of Ichkeria | First Chechen War |
| Ahmed Zakaev | Chechen Republic of Ichkeria | Second Chechen War |
| Zelimkhan Yandarbiyev | Chechen Republic of Ichkeria | Second Chechen War |
| Zelimkhan Yandarbiyev | Chechen Republic of Ichkeria | First Chechen War |
| Ibn al-Khattab | Arab Mujahideen in Chechnya | Second Chechen War |
| Ibn al-Khattab | Arab Mujahideen in Chechnya | First Chechen War |
| Abdul-Halim Sadulayev | Chechen Republic of Ichkeria | First Chechen War |
| Abdul-Halim Sadulayev | Chechen Republic of Ichkeria | Second Chechen War |
| Shamil Basayev | Chechen Republic of Ichkeria | First Chechen War |

== Chile ==
| Guerrilla leader | Movement | War |
|---|---|---|
| Galvarino Apablaza | Manuel Rodríguez Patriotic Front | Armed resistance in Chile |
| Manuel Rodríguez Erdoíza | Patriots | Chilean War of Independence |
| Miguel Enríquez | Revolutionary Left Movement | Armed resistance in Chile |
| José Gregorio Liendo | Revolutionary Left Movement | Armed resistance in Chile |
| Raúl Pellegrin | Manuel Rodríguez Patriotic Front | Armed resistance in Chile |

== China ==
| Guerrilla leader | Movement | War |
|---|---|---|
| Mao Zedong | Chinese Communist Party | Chinese Civil War |
| Zhou Enlai | Chinese Communist Party | Chinese Civil War |
| Sun Yat-sen | Kuomintang | 1911 Revolution |
| Bai Chongxi | Kuomintang | Chinese Civil War |
| Chiang Kai-shek | Kuomintang | Chinese Civil War |

== Colombia ==
| Guerrilla leader | Movement | War |
|---|---|---|
| Jacobo Arenas | National Liberation Army | Colombian conflict |
| Manuel Marulanda | Revolutionary Armed Forces of Colombia | Colombian conflict |
| Camilo Torres | Revolutionary Armed Forces of Colombia | Colombian conflict |

== Cuba ==
| Guerrilla leader | Movement | War |
|---|---|---|
| Fidel Castro | July 26th Movement | Cuban Revolution |
| Camilo Cienfuegos | July 26th Movement | Cuban Revolution |
| Che Guevara | July 26th Movement | Cuban Revolution |
| Antonio Maceo | Cuban Liberation Army | Cuban War of Independence |

== Cyprus ==
| Guerrilla leader | Movement | War |
|---|---|---|
| Georgios Grivas | EOKA | Cyprus Emergency |
| Grigoris Afxentiou | EOKA | Cyprus Emergency |
| Kyriakos Matsis | EOKA | Cyprus Emergency |
| Nikos Sampson | EOKA | Cyprus Emergency |

== Dagestan ==
| Guerrilla leader | Movement | War |
|---|---|---|
| Imam Shamil | Caucasian Imamate | Murid War |
| Ibn al-Khattab | Arab Mujahideen in Chechnya | War in Dagestan |
| Shamil Basayev | Chechen Republic of Ichkeria | War in Dagestan |

== Democratic Republic of the Congo ==
| Guerrilla leader | Movement | War |
|---|---|---|
| Laurent-Désiré Kabila | Alliance of Democratic Forces for the Liberation of Congo | First Congo War |
| Laurent Nkunda | Rwandan Defence Forces | First Congo War |
| Pierre Mulele | Simba rebel | Simba rebellion |

== Dominican Republic ==
| Guerrilla leader | Movement | War |
|---|---|---|
| Ramón Natera | Constitutionalist faction | Dominican Civil War |
| Gregorio Urbano Gilbert | Constitutionalist faction | Dominican Civil War |

== Egypt ==
- Inaros - (Egyptian rebel ruler) together with Athenian allies fought for a year and a half in the marshes in north Egypt against Persians.

== El Salvador ==
| Guerrilla leader | Movement | War |
|---|---|---|
| Farabundo Martí | Communist Party of El Salvador | La Matanza |
| Schafik Handal | Farabundo Martí National Liberation Front | Salvadoran Civil War |
| Cayetano Carpio | Farabundo Martí National Liberation Front | Salvadoran Civil War |
| Joaquín Villalobos | Farabundo Martí National Liberation Front | Salvadoran Civil War |
| Ana María | Farabundo Martí National Liberation Front | Salvadoran Civil War |

== Eritrea ==
| Guerrilla leader | Movement | War |
|---|---|---|
| Isaias Afewerki | Eritrean People's Liberation Front | Eritrean War of Independence |
| Hamid Idris Awate | Eritrean People's Liberation Front | Eritrean War of Independence |
| Woldeab Woldemariam | Eritrean People's Liberation Front | Eritrean War of Independence |

== Estonia ==
| Guerrilla leader | Movement | War |
|---|---|---|
| August Sabbe | Forest brothers | Occupation of the Baltic States |
| Ülo Voitka | Forest brothers | Occupation of the Baltic States |
| Alfred Käärmann | Forest brothers | Occupation of the Baltic States |

== Ethiopia ==
| Guerrilla leader | Movement | War |
|---|---|---|
| Hayelom Araya | Ethiopian People's Revolutionary Democratic Front | Ethiopian Civil War |
| Kinfe Gebremedhin | Tigray People's Liberation Front | Ethiopian Civil War |
| Meles Zenawi | Ethiopian People's Revolutionary Democratic Front | Ethiopian Civil War |
| Siye Abraha | Ethiopian People's Revolutionary Democratic Front | Ethiopian Civil War |
| Debretsion Gebremichael | Tigray People's Liberation Front | Ethiopian Civil War |

== Finland ==
- Paavali Halonen
- Lauri Törni
- Pekka Vesainen

== France ==
- François le Clerc - 16th-century French privateer known as "Jambe de Bois" (Peg Leg) who is credited as the first pirate in the modern era to have a "peg leg".
- Bertrand du Guesclin
- Charles Deschamps de Boishébert et de Raffetot - Quebec born member of the Compagnies Franches de la Marine who was a leader of the Acadian militia in the resistance to the Expulsion of the Acadians.
- Sébastien Rale
- Jean-Louis Le Loutre
- Pierre Georges - member of the French Communist Party during World War II
- Charles de Gaulle
- Nancy Wake
- Georges Cadoudal
- Joseph Epstein
- Jean-Baptiste du Casse
- Jean Fleury
- Jean Ango
- Jeanne de Clisson

== Frisia ==
- Pier Gerlofs Donia
- Wijerd Jelckama

== Germany ==
- Arminius - Germanic chieftain who orchestrated the legendary ambush against the Romans at the Battle of the Teutoburg Forest.
- Klein Henszlein - German pirate from 1560 to 1573 who raided shipping in the North Sea
- Paul von Lettow-Vorbeck
- Thomas Müntzer
- Otto Skorzeny - Austrian elite operative who conducted unconventional operations in World War II for Nazi Germany
- Franz von Rintelen
- Johann Ewald
- Carl von Clausewitz
- Felix von Luckner

== Greece ==
- Athanasios Diakos
- Geórgios Karaïskákis
- Manolis Glezos
- Markos Botsaris
- Odysseas Androutsos
- Theodoros Kolokotronis
- Antonis Vratsanos
- Daskalogiannis

== Guatemala ==
| Guerrilla leader | Movement | War |
|---|---|---|
| Rodrigo Asturias | Guatemalan National Revolutionary Unity | Guatemalan Civil War |
| Rolando Morán | Guatemalan National Revolutionary Unity | Guatemalan Civil War |

== Haiti ==
- Charlemagne Péralte
- Toussaint L'ouverture
- Francois Mackandal
- Vincent Oge
- Jean-Bertrand Aristide
- Jean-Jacques Dessalines
- Francois Capois
- Henri Christophe
- Sans-Souci
- Dutty Boukman

== India ==
- Chhatrapati Shivaji Maharaj
- Kerala Varma Pazhassi Raja in Kerala
- Sangolli Rayanna in Karnataka
- Komaram Bheem in Andhra Pradesh
- Alluri Sita Rama Raju in Andhra Pradesh
- Malik Ambar
- Patel Sudhakar Reddy
- Sardar Muhammad Ibrahim Khan
- Sayeed Salahudeen
- Yasin Malik

== Indonesia ==
| Guerrilla leader | Movement | War |
|---|---|---|
| Abdul Haris Nasution | Emergency Government of the Republic of Indonesia | Indonesian National Revolution |
| Sudirman | Emergency Government of the Republic of Indonesia | Indonesian National Revolution |

== Iran ==
| Guerrilla leader | Movement | War |
|---|---|---|
| Babak Khorramdin | Khurramites | Abbasid Caliphate. |
| Hassan-i Sabbah | Order of Assassins | Nizari–Seljuk conflicts |
| Mostafa Chamran | Islamic Revolutionary Guard Corps | Iran–Iraq War |
| Massoud Rajavi | People's Mujahedin of Iran | Iranian revolution |
| Rais-Ali Delvari | | Persian campaign |

== Iraq ==
| Guerrilla leader | Movement | War |
|---|---|---|
| Abu Muslim | Abbasid Caliphate | Abbasid Revolution |
| Zayd ibn Ali | Alids | Revolt of Zayd ibn Ali |
| Abu Musab al-Zarqawi | Al-Qaeda in Iraq | Iraq War |
| Abu Ayyub al-Masri | Al-Qaeda in Iraq | Iraq War |
| Abu Omar al-Baghdadi | Al-Qaeda in Iraq | Iraq War |
| Muqtada al-Sadr | Mahdi Army | Iraq War |
| Abu Azrael | Popular Mobilization Forces | Iraqi insurgency |

== Ireland ==
| Guerrilla leader | Movement | War |
|---|---|---|
| Michael Collins | Irish Republican Army | Irish War of Independence |
| Tom Barry | Irish Republican Army | Irish War of Independence |
| Gerry Adams (allegedly) | Provisional IRA Army Council | Troubles |
| Martin McGuinness | Provisional IRA Army Council | Troubles |
| Seamus Costello | Official IRA | Troubles |
| Dominic McGlinchey | Provisional Irish Republican Army and later Irish National Liberation Army | Troubles |
| Frank Aiken | Anti-Treaty Irish Republican Army | Irish War of Independence Irish Civil War |
| Billy Wright | Loyalist Volunteer Force (LVF) | Troubles |
| John Gregg | Ulster Defence Association | Troubles |
| Johnny Adair | Ulster Defence Association | Troubles |
| Lenny Murphy | Ulster Volunteer Force | Troubles |

== Israel ==
| Guerrilla leader | Movement | War |
|---|---|---|
| Menachem Begin | Irgun | Jewish insurgency |
| Yitzhak Shamir | Lehi | Jewish insurgency |
| Avraham Stern | Lehi | Jewish insurgency |
| Yohai Ben-Nun | Haganah | Jewish insurgency |
| Haim Bar-Lev | Haganah | Jewish insurgency |
| Aharon Davidi | Haganah | Jewish insurgency |
| Yekutiel Adam | Haganah | Jewish insurgency |
| Ariel Sharon | Haganah | Jewish insurgency |
| Danny Matt | Haganah | Jewish insurgency |
| Mordechai Gur | Haganah | Jewish insurgency |
| Rafael Eitan | Haganah | Jewish insurgency |

== Italy ==
- Spartacus
- Quintus Fabius Maximus Verrucosus
- Giuseppe Garibaldi
- Giuseppe Mazzini
- Carmine Crocco
- Ninco Nanco
- Licio Visintini - decorated Italian naval officer who conducted unconventional amphibious warfare like missions against allied shipping in World War II

== Japan ==
- Genpei War
  - Yoritomo
    - Minamoto no Yoshitsune
    - Minamoto no Noriyori
    - Minamoto no Yoritomo
  - Yoshinaka
    - Minamoto no Yoshinaka
    - Minamoto no Yukiie
  - Taira clan
    - Taira no Kiyomori
- Genkō War
  - Kusunoki Masashige
- Boshin War
  - Tatsumi Naofumi
  - Hosoya Jūdayū
  - Hayashi Tadataka
- World War II
  - Tadamichi Kuribayashi
  - Hiroo Onoda
- Other
  - Fūma Kotarō
  - Tateoka Doshun
  - Ōishi Yoshio
  - Mochizuki Chiyome
  - Tsuneo Mori

== Korea ==
- Japanese invasions of Korea (1592–1598)
  - Kwak Chaeu
  - Hyujeong
  - Cho Hŏn
  - Chŏng Munbu
- Japanese colonial rule of Korea
  - Ji Cheong-cheon
  - Lee Beom-seok
  - Kim Won-bong
  - Kim Hong-il
  - Kim Il Sung
  - Kim Chwa-chin
  - Yun Hui-sun
- Others
  - Choe Ik-hyeon
  - Shin Dol-seok

== Kosovo ==
| Guerrilla leader | Movement | War |
|---|---|---|
| Adem Jashari | Kosovo Liberation Army | Kosovo war |
| Ramush Haradinaj | Kosovo Liberation Army | Kosovo war |
| Agim Ceku | Kosovo Liberation Army | Kosovo war |
| Agim Ramadani | Kosovo Liberation Army | Kosovo war |
| Sali Çekaj | Kosovo Liberation Army | Kosovo war |
| Hamëz Jashari | Kosovo Liberation Army | Kosovo war |
| Bekim Berisha | Kosovo Liberation Army | Kosovo war |
| Luan Haradinaj | Kosovo Liberation Army | Kosovo war |
| Daut Haradinaj | Kosovo Liberation Army | Kosovo war |

== Kenya ==
| Guerrilla leader | Movement | War |
|---|---|---|
| Dedan Kimathi | Mau Mau rebels | Mau Mau rebellion |
| Waruhiu Itote | Mau Mau rebels | Mau Mau rebellion |
| Musa Mwariama | Mau Mau rebels | Mau Mau rebellion |

== Kurdish regions ==
| Guerrilla leader | Movement | War |
|---|---|---|
| Mahmud Barzanji | Kurdistan Democratic Party | Iraqi–Kurdish conflict |
| Mahmoud Ezidi | Kurdistan Democratic Party | Iraqi–Kurdish conflict |
| Foad Mostafa Soltani | Komala Party of Iranian Kurdistan | 1979 Kurdish rebellion in Iran |
| Jalal Talabani | Kurdistan Democratic Party | Iraqi–Kurdish conflict |
| Nawshirwan Mustafa | Patriotic Union of Kurdistan | Kurdish–Turkish conflict |
| Najmadin Shukr Rauf | Patriotic Union of Kurdistan | Iraqi–Kurdish conflict |
| Abdul Rahman Ghassemlou | Democratic Party of Iranian Kurdistan | 1979 Kurdish rebellion in Iran |
| Sadegh Sharafkandi | Democratic Party of Iranian Kurdistan | 1979 Kurdish rebellion in Iran |
| Abdullah Öcalan | Kurdistan Workers' Party | Kurdish–Turkish conflict |
| Murat Karayılan | Kurdistan Workers' Party | Kurdish–Turkish conflict |
| Cemil Bayık | Kurdistan Workers' Party | Kurdish–Turkish conflict |
| Sakine Cansız | Kurdistan Workers' Party | Kurdish–Turkish conflict |
| Mazlum Doğan | Kurdistan Workers' Party | Kurdish–Turkish conflict |
| Mahsum Korkmaz | Kurdistan Workers' Party | Kurdish–Turkish conflict |

== Laos ==
| Guerrilla leader | Movement | War |
|---|---|---|
| General Vang Pao | Secret Army | Laotian Civil War |
| Pa Chay Vue | Hmong rebels | Vue Pa Chay's revolt |
| Ong Kommandan | Phu Mi Bun Movement | Holy Man's Rebellion |
| Ong Keo | Phu Mi Bun Movement | Holy Man's Rebellion |

== Latvia ==
| Guerrilla leader | Movement | War |
|---|---|---|
| Pēteris Dzelzītis | Latvian partisans | Guerrilla war in the Baltic states |

== Lebanon ==
| Guerrilla leader | Movement | War |
|---|---|---|
| Hassan Nasrallah | Hezbollah | Lebanese Civil War |

== Lesotho ==
| Guerrilla leader | Movement | War |
|---|---|---|
| Ntsu Mokhehle | Lesotho Liberation Army | BCP insurgency |

== Liberia ==
| Guerrilla leader | Movement | War |
|---|---|---|
| Charles Taylor | National Patriotic Front of Liberia | First Liberian Civil War |
| Charles Taylor | National Patriotic Front of Liberia | Sierra Leonean Civil War |
| Prince Johnson | Independent National Patriotic Front of Liberia | First Liberian Civil War |

== Libya ==
| Guerrilla leader | Movement | War |
|---|---|---|
| Omar Mukhtar | Senussi Brotherhood | Second Italo-Senussi War |

== Lithuania ==
| Guerrilla leader | Movement | War |
|---|---|---|
| Jonas Žemaitis | Lithuanian Union of Freedom Fighters | Lithuanian partisans |
| Adolfas Ramanauskas | Lithuanian Union of Freedom Fighters | Lithuanian partisans |
| Juozas Lukša | Lithuanian Union of Freedom Fighters | Lithuanian partisans |

== Malaysia ==
| Guerrilla leader | Movement | War |
|---|---|---|
| Chin Peng | Malayan Communist Party | Malayan Emergency |

== Mexico ==
| Guerrilla leader | Movement | War |
|---|---|---|
| Vicente Guerrero | Mexican Insurgent Army | Mexican War of Independence |
| Guadalupe Victoria | Mexican Insurgent Army | Mexican War of Independence |
| Xavier Mina | Mexican Insurgent Army | Mexican War of Independence |
| Davy Crockett | Army of the Republic of Texas | Texas Revolution |
| Sam Houston | Army of the Republic of Texas | Texas Revolution |
| William Barret Travis | Army of the Republic of Texas | Texas Revolution |
| Juan Seguín | Army of the Republic of Texas | Texas Revolution |
| James Bowie | Army of the Republic of Texas | Texas Revolution |
| James Fannin | Army of the Republic of Texas | Texas Revolution |
| Juan Cortina | Cortinistas | Cortina Troubles |
| Victorio | Apacheria | Apache Wars |
| Geronimo | Apacheria | Apache Wars |
| Cajemé | Yaqui | Yaqui Wars |
| Francisco I. Madero | Maderistas | Mexican Revolution |
| Pancho Villa | Northern Division | Mexican Revolution |
| Emiliano Zapata | Liberation Army of the South | Mexican Revolution |
| Ricardo Flores Magón | Mexican Liberal Party | Mexican Revolution |
| Enrique Flores Magón | Mexican Liberal Party | Mexican Revolution |
| Lucio Cabañas | Party of the Poor | Mexican Dirty War |
| Subcomandante Marcos | Zapatista Army of National Liberation | Chiapas Conflict |

== Mongolia ==
- Genghis Khan
- Tolui
- Jebe
- Subutai

== Morocco ==
| Guerrilla leader | Movement | War |
|---|---|---|
| Abd el-Krim | Rif Republic | Rif War |
| Mouha ou Hammou Zayani | Qaid | Zaian War |
| Mohammed Ameziane | Riffians | Second Melillan campaign |

== Mozambique ==
| Guerrilla leader | Movement | War |
|---|---|---|
| Afonso Dhlakama | Renamo | Mozambican Civil War |
| Afonso Dhlakama | Renamo | Mozambican War of Independence |
| Eduardo Mondlane | Frelimo | Mozambican Civil War |
| Eduardo Mondlane | Frelimo | Mozambican War of Independence |
| Samora Machel | Frelimo | Mozambican Civil War |
| Samora Machel | Frelimo | Mozambican War of Independence |
| Filipe Samuel Magaia | Frelimo | Mozambican War of Independence |
| André Matsangaissa | Frelimo (1972–1975) | Mozambican Civil War |
| André Matsangaissa | Renamo (1975–1979) | Mozambican War of Independence |

== Myanmar ==
- Khun Sa
- Saya San
- Johnny and Luther Htoo

== Namibia ==
- Jakobus Morenga
- Hendrik Witbooi

== Nepal ==
| Guerrilla leader | Movement | War |
|---|---|---|
| Prachanda | Nepal Communist Party | Nepalese Civil War |

== Netherlands ==
- Pier Gerlofs Donia
- Wijerd Jelckama
- Abraham Blauvelt
- Michiel Andrieszoon - Dutch buccaneer active in the 1680s.
- Jan Willems (Dutch buccaneer)
- Cornelis Jol
- Roche Braziliano

== Nicaragua ==
| Guerrilla leader | Movement | War |
|---|---|---|
| Adolfo Calero | Contras | Nicaraguan Revolution |
| Arlen Siu | Sandinista National Liberation Front | Nicaraguan Revolution |
| Augusto César Sandino | Army in Defense of the National Sovereignty of Nicaragua | United States occupation of Nicaragua |
| Daniel Ortega | Sandinista National Liberation Front | Nicaraguan Revolution |
| Dora María Téllez | Sandinista National Liberation Front | Nicaraguan Revolution |
| Edén Pastora | Contras | Nicaraguan Revolution |
| Enrique Bermúdez | Contras | Nicaraguan Revolution |
| Humberto Ortega | Sandinista National Liberation Front | Nicaraguan Revolution |
| Joaquín Cuadra | Sandinista National Liberation Front | Nicaraguan Revolution |
| Nora Astorga | Sandinista National Liberation Front | Nicaraguan Revolution |
| Rigoberto Cruz | Sandinista National Liberation Front | Nicaraguan Revolution |
| Carlos Fonseca | Sandinista National Liberation Front | Nicaraguan Revolution |

== Nigeria ==
| Guerrilla leader | Movement | War |
|---|---|---|
| Ateke Tom | Ijaw militia | Conflict in the Niger Delta |
| Henry Okah | Movement for the Emancipation of the Niger Delta | Conflict in the Niger Delta |
| Mujahid Dokubo-Asari | Niger Delta People's Volunteer Force | Conflict in the Niger Delta |
| Odumegwu Ojukwu | Biafran Armed Forces | Biafra war |
| Philip Effiong | Biafran Armed Forces | Biafra war |

== Norway ==
| Guerrilla leader | Movement | War |
|---|---|---|
| Martin Linge | Royal Norwegian Army | German occupation of Norway |

== Pakistan ==
| Guerrilla leader | Movement | War |
|---|---|---|
| Ilyas Kashmiri | Al-Qaeda | Insurgency in Jammu and Kashmir |
| Osama bin Laden | Maktab al-Khidamat | Soviet–Afghan War |
| Malik Munawar Khan Awan | Azad Hind | World War II |
| Nauroz Khan | Kalat insurgents | 1958–1959 Kalat rebellion |
| Allah Nazar Baloch | Balochistan Liberation Front | Insurgency in Balochistan |
| Balach Marri | Balochistan Liberation Front | Insurgency in Balochistan |
| Sher Mohammad Marri | Balochistan Liberation Front | Insurgency in Balochistan |

== Palestine ==
| Guerrilla leader | Movement | War |
|---|---|---|
| Abd al-Qadir al-Husayni | Army of the Holy War | 1947–1948 civil war in Mandatory Palestine |
| Yasser Arafat | Palestine Liberation Organization | Israeli–Palestinian conflict |
| George Habash | Popular Front for the Liberation of Palestine | Israeli–Palestinian conflict |
| Wadie Haddad | Popular Front for the Liberation of Palestine | Israeli–Palestinian conflict |
| Abu Nidal | Abu Nidal Organization | Israeli–Palestinian conflict |
| Ahmed Yassin | Hamas | Israeli–Palestinian conflict |
| Yahya Ayyash | Hamas | Israeli–Palestinian conflict |
| Yahya Sinwar | Hamas | Israeli–Palestinian conflict |
| Mohammed Deif | | Israeli–Palestinian conflict |
| Ahmad Sa'adat | Popular Front for the Liberation of Palestine | Israeli–Palestinian conflict |
| Abu Ali Mustafa | Popular Front for the Liberation of Palestine | Israeli–Palestinian conflict |
| Marwan Barghouti | Palestine Liberation Organization | Israeli–Palestinian conflict |
| Khalil al-Wazir | Palestine Liberation Organization | Israeli–Palestinian conflict |
| Izz El-Deen Sheikh Khalil | Hamas | Israeli–Palestinian conflict |
| Ali Hassan Salameh | Black September Organization | Israeli–Palestinian conflict |
| Zakaria Zubeidi | Al-Aqsa Martyrs' Brigades | Israeli–Palestinian conflict |
| Dalal Mughrabi | Palestine Liberation Organization | Israeli–Palestinian conflict |
| Leila Khaled | Palestine Liberation Organization | |
| Izz ad-Din al-Qassam | Black Hand | 1936–1939 Arab revolt in Palestine |
| Abdel Aziz al-Rantissi | Hamas | Israeli–Palestinian conflict |
| Omar Rezaq | Abu Nidal Organization | Israeli–Palestinian conflict |
| Mahmoud Tawalbe | Palestinian Islamic Jihad | Israeli–Palestinian conflict |
| Yasser Abu Shabab | Popular Forces | Anti-Hamas insurgency in the Gaza Strip |

== Peru ==
| Guerrilla leader | Movement | War |
|---|---|---|
| Abimael Guzmán | Shining Path | Internal conflict in Peru |
| Héctor Béjar | National Liberation Army | Internal conflict in Peru |
| Hugo Blanco | Workers' Revolutionary Party | Internal conflict in Peru |
| Javier Heraud | National Liberation Army | Internal conflict in Peru |

== Philippines ==
- Wendell Fertig
- Gabriela Silang
- José María Sison
- Luis Taruc
- Emilio Aguinaldo
- Macario Sakay
- Andrés Bonifacio
- Baldomero Aguinaldo
- Gregorio del Pilar
- Antonio Luna
- Emilio Jacinto
- Juan Pajota - Filipino guerrilla leader who played a major role in the Raid at Cabanatuan
- Eduardo Joson

== Poland ==
- Feliks Ankerstein
- Dawid Moryc Apfelbaum
- Edmund Charaszkiewicz
- Jerzy Dąbrowski
- Henryk "Hubal" Dobrzański
- Franciszek Kamiński
- Tadeusz Komorowski
- Aleksander Józef Lisowski
- Leopold Okulicki
- Witold Pilecki
- Jan Piwnik
- Kazimierz Pużak
- Stefan Rowecki
- Avraham Stern (from Suwałki; backed by the Polish Army in 1938 & 1939)
- Emil August Fieldorf "Nil"
- Joseph Epstein - Polish born activist who fought for the French Resistance in World War II
- Mordechai Anielewicz

== Portugal ==
- Viriathus

== Romania ==
- Mircea I of Wallachia
- Vlad the Impaler
- Stephen III of Moldavia

== Rwanda ==
| Guerrilla leader | Movement | War |
|---|---|---|
| Paul Kagame | Rwandan Patriotic Front | Rwandan Genocide |
| Fred Rwigyema | Rwandan Patriotic Front | Rwandan Genocide |

== Scotland ==
- First War of Scottish Independence
  - William Wallace
  - Robert I of Scotland
  - The Black Douglas
  - Andrew Moray
  - William the Hardy
  - Thomas Randolph
  - Simon Fraser
  - John Comyn
- Second War of Scottish Independence
  - Andrew Murray
  - William Douglas
  - Patrick V
  - John Randolph
  - Archibald Douglas
- Others
  - Andrew Barton (privateer) - notorious Scottish sailor who made raids against Portuguese ships.

== Sierra Leone ==
| Guerrilla leader | Movement | War |
|---|---|---|
| Foday Sankoh | Revolutionary United Front | Sierra Leone Civil War |

== Singapore ==
- Lim Bo Seng, Force 136
- Tan Chong Tee, Force 136

== South Africa ==
| Guerrilla leader | Movement | War |
|---|---|---|
| Piet Joubert | Transvaal | Boer Wars |
| Schalk Willem Burger | Transvaal | Boer Wars |
| Piet Cronjé | Transvaal | Boer Wars |
| Joachim Ferreira | Transvaal | Boer Wars |
| Francois Gerhardus Joubert | Transvaal | Boer Wars |
| Nicolaas Smit | Transvaal | Boer Wars |
| Jan Smuts | Transvaal | Boer Wars |
| Louis Botha | Transvaal | Boer Wars |
| Johannes Lötter | Cape Colony | Boer Wars |
| Christiaan de Wet | Orange Free State | Boer Wars |
| Pieter Hendrik Kritzinger | Orange Free State | Boer Wars |
| Jan Smuts | Transvaal | Boer Wars |
| Schalk Willem Burger | Transvaal | Boer Wars |
| Christiaan Frederik Beyers | Transvaal | Boer Wars |
| Koos de la Rey | Orange Free State | Boer Wars |
| Martinus Theunis Steyn | Orange Free State | Boer Wars |
| Gideon Scheepers | Orange Free State | Boer Wars |
| Deneys Reitz | Orange Free State | Boer Wars |
| Nelson Mandela | African National Congress | Apartheid |
| Walter Sisulu | African National Congress | Apartheid |
| Jacob Zuma | African National Congress | Apartheid |
| Joe Slovo | South African Communist Party | Apartheid |
| Chris Hani | South African Communist Party | Apartheid |
| Potlako Leballo | Pan Africanist Congress of Azania | Apartheid |

== Soviet Union ==
| Guerrilla leader | Movement | War |
|---|---|---|
| Mikhail Frunze | Red Army | Basmachi revolt |
| Sergey Stepnyak-Kravchinsky | Serb rebels | Herzegovina uprising |
| Stepan Bandera | Organisation of Ukrainian Nationalists | Anti-Soviet resistance by the Ukrainian Insurgent Army |
| Sydir Kovpak | Red Army | Russian Civil War |
| Semyon Rudniev | Red Army | Russian Civil War |
| Serge Obolensky | Russian White Army | Russian Civil War |

== Spain ==
- Aben Humeya
- Abo Hafs Omer Al-Baloty
- Juan Guartem - late 17th century Spanish renegade pirate
- Francisco Sabate - El Quico, Anarchist maquis fighter killed in 1960
- José Miguel Beñaran Ordeñana
- Pelagius of Asturias
- Umar ibn Hafsun
- El Empecinado
- Johanne Galan "La Galana"
- Francisco Abad Moreno "Chaleco"
- Agustina de Aragón
- Vicente López Tovar
- Viriathus

== Sudan ==
| Guerrilla leader | Movement | War |
|---|---|---|
| John Garang | South Sudan People's Defence Forces | First Sudanese Civil War |
| John Garang | South Sudan People's Defence Forces | Second Sudanese Civil War |
| Khalil Ibrahim | Justice and Equality Movement | War in Darfur |
| Muhammad Ahmad | Mahdist State | Mahdist War |
| Osman Digna | Mahdist State | Mahdist War |
| Rabih az-Zubayr | Kanem-Bornu Empire | Rabih War |
| Sebehr Rahma | Mahdist State | Mahdist War |

== Suriname ==
| Guerrilla leader | Movement | War |
|---|---|---|
| Ronnie Brunswijk | Jungle Commando | Surinamese Interior War |

== Syria ==
| Guerrilla leader | Movement | War |
|---|---|---|
| Sultan al-Atrash | Syrian rebels | Great Syrian Revolt |
| Saladin | Ayyubid dynasty | Third Crusade |

== Thailand ==
- See Bang Rachan
- Phraya Phichai

== Tunisia ==
- Abu 'Abdullah al-Shi'i
- Abu Yazid
- Hannibal
- Mago Barca

== Turkey ==
- Şeyh Bedrettin
- Hayreddin Barbarossa - famous admiral of the fleet of the Ottoman Empire
- Dragut

== Uganda ==
| Guerrilla leader | Movement | War |
|---|---|---|
| Yoweri Museveni | National Resistance Movement | Ugandan Bush War |
| Alice Auma | Holy Spirit Movement | War in Uganda |
| Joseph Kony | Lord's Resistance Army | Lord's Resistance Army insurgency |

== Ukraine ==
| Guerrilla leader | Movement | War |
|---|---|---|
| Nestor Makhno | Revolutionary Insurgent Army of Ukraine | Russian Civil War |
| Maria Nikiforova | Revolutionary Insurgent Army of Ukraine | Russian Civil War |

== United Kingdom ==
- Glyndŵr Rising
  - Owain Glyndŵr in Wales
- American Revolution
  - Banastre Tarleton – British Cavalry officer of the British Legion (American Revolution) in the American Revolution
  - Lieutenant Colonel John Graves Simcoe of the Queen's Rangers in the American Revolution
  - Christopher Carleton – led raids in the American Revolution
  - Patrick Ferguson
  - William Caldwell
  - Bloody Bill Cunningham
  - David Fanning
  - Simon Girty
  - John Butler
  - James De Lancey
- War of 1812
  - James FitzGibbon
  - William Johnson Kerr
  - Tecumseh – Native-American guerrilla leader who served the British in the War of 1812
  - Phineas Riall
  - Adam Muir – Battle of Maguaga
  - James Gordon
  - George Cockburn
  - James Lucas Yeo – conducted 3 raids. The second British raid at Charlotte, New York, at the mouth of the Genesse River (June 15, 1813). Performed the raid at the battle of Fort Oswego. And the raid at Sodus, New York (June 19, 1813)
  - Cecil Bisshopp
  - William Caldwell
  - John Brant
  - Gordon Drummond
  - William Mulcaster
  - Charles de Salaberry
- World War I
  - T. E. Lawrence (Lawrence of Arabia) in Arabia
- World War II
  - David Stirling – Scottish born officer who was the founder of the Special Air Service
  - Tommy Macpherson – Scottish born British-army officer who conducted guerrilla operations in World War II
  - Roy Farran – in command of Operations Wallace and Hardy
  - Orde Wingate – (founder of the Chindits) in Palestine and Burma
  - Mike Calvert – British soldier nicknamed "Mad Mike" who participated in Chindit operations and was influential in promoting the ideas of unconventional warfare by Orde Wingate.
  - Jack Churchill – British soldier named "Mad Jack" who fought in World War II armed with a longbow, bagpipes, and a Scottish broadsword.
  - Ursula Graham Bower – led the Nagas against the Japanese during World War II
  - Nancy Wake – New Zealand born female operative who joined the Special Operations Executive and participated in operations with the French Resistance in World War II
  - Virginia Hall – American spy who worked with the Special Operations Executive in the European theatre of World War II before joining the American Office of Strategic Services.
  - Fitzroy Maclean worked with Tito and Yugoslav Partisans during World War II
  - Ivan Lyon – member of the Z Special Unit
  - Robert Grainger Ker Thompson – famous British military officer and counter-insurgency expert who served in the Burma Campaign
  - Carol Mather
  - John Durnford-Slater
- Malayan Emergency
  - Robert Grainger Ker Thompson – famous British military officer and counter-insurgency expert
- Other
  - Henry Mainwaring – nicknamed "The Dread Pirate".
  - Edward Davis (buccaneer) – English buccaneer active in the Caribbean during the 1680s.
  - William Kyd – 15th-century English pirate active in Southwest England from the 1430s until the 1450s.
  - John Nutt – notorious 17th-century English pirate who raided the coasts of Southern Canada and Western England for over three years before his capture.
  - Henry Jennings – 18th-century English privateer from the colony of Bermuda
  - Samuel Bellamy – "Black Bellamy"
  - Howell Davis – Welsh pirate
  - Charles Bellamy – English pirate raided colonial American shipping in New England and later off the coast of Canada.
  - William Dampier
  - Blackbeard – one of the most notorious pirates from England
  - James Alday
  - John Bear (pirate)
  - William Rous
  - William Parker
  - Dick Turpin

== United States ==
- French and Indian War
  - Kingdom of Great Britain, British America, and Native American allies
    - John Stark
    - John Armstrong Sr.
    - Eyre Massey
    - Sayenqueraghta
    - Robert Rogers
    - Daniel Morgan
  - Kingdom of France, New France, and Native American allies
    - Jean Erdman
    - Francois-Marie
    - Daniel Lienard de Beaujeu
    - Jean-Daniel Dumas
    - Charles Michel de Langlade
    - Pontiac
- Revolutionary War
  - George Washington
  - John Parker
  - Benjamin Cleveland
  - Elijah Clarke
  - John Sevier
  - Ethan Allen
  - William Campbell
  - Francis Marion
  - Andrew Pickens
  - Thomas Sumter
  - Samuel Whittemore
  - William Richardson Davie
  - James Williams
  - Isaac Shelby
  - John Schenck
  - William Russell
  - Andrew Jackson
  - Philemon Dickinson
  - William Moultrie
  - John Sullivan
  - Seth Warner
  - Marinus Willett
  - Nathanael Greene
  - Daniel Morgan
  - Return J. Meigs Sr.
  - William Barton
  - John Glover
  - Edward Hand
  - William Maxwell – American Continental general whose guerrilla actions are notable in the Forage War, Battle of Cooch's Bridge, and Battle of Connecticut Farms.
  - Henry Lee III
  - Allan McLane
  - Benjamin Tallmadge
  - William Washington
  - David Wooster
  - Timothy Murphy – his exploits of guerrilla-like actions are shown in What Manner of Men: Forgotten Heroes of the American Revolution by Fred J. Cook in Chapter III
  - Thomas Knowlton
  - John Stark
  - Anthony Wayne – led a famous surprise night attack in the Battle of Stony Point.
  - Adam Hyler – German who immigrated to America and became a privateer harassing the British by destroying ships, capturing crews, and conducting raids.
  - George Wait Babcock
  - Jeremiah O'Brien – led the first American attack in the Raid on St. John (1775)
  - Gustavus Conyngham – Irish-born American officer in the continental navy and a privateer who has been called "the most successful of all Continental Navy Captains."
  - John Rathbun – officer in the Continental Navy whose most well known exploit was his own raid at Nassau. Not to be confused with the first Raid of Nassau
  - John Barry
  - Herbert Woodbury
  - Noah Stoddard
  - John Paul Jones
  - Jonathan Haraden – his unconventional type of warfare at sea are mentioned in What Manner of Men: Forgotten Heroes of the American Revolution by Fred J. Cook in chapter IX.
  - Nicholas Biddle
  - Joshua Barney
  - David Hawley
  - Morgan's Riflemen
  - Whitcomb's Rangers
  - 1st Continental Light Dragoons
  - 2nd Continental Light Dragoons
  - Lee's Legion
  - American Militia
  - American Privateers
- Northwest Indian War
  - United States
    - Charles Scott
    - James Wilkinson
    - John Hardin
    - Benjamin Logan
    - William Wells
  - Native Americans
    - Little Turtle
    - Buckongahelas
    - Egushawa
    - Blue Jacket
- Quasi-War
  - Silas Talbot
  - Isaac Hull
  - Daniel Carmick
  - Stephen Decatur Sr.
  - Benjamin Stoddert
  - David Porter
- First Barbary War
  - John Rodgers
  - Andrew Sterett
  - Lewis Heermann
  - Stephen Decatur
  - Thomas Macdonough
  - William Eaton
- War of 1812
  - Andrew Jackson
  - Alexander Macomb
  - Benjamin Forsyth
  - Daniel Appling
  - Lodowick Morgan
  - Bennet C. Riley
  - Alexander Smyth
  - Jacob Brown
  - Peter B. Porter
  - John Coffee
  - Philip Reed
  - Azariah C. Flagg
  - Richard Mentor Johnson
  - Ninian Edwards
  - Davy Crockett
  - Caleb Hopkins
  - Joseph Bartholomew
  - John Tipton
  - John Ketcham
  - William Dudley
  - Nathan Boone
  - Thomas Hinds
  - Buckner F. Harris
  - Lewis Cass
  - Samuel Dale
  - John Williams
  - William Whitley
  - John Swift
  - Benjamin Mooers
  - Benjamin Howard
  - John Floyd
  - Isaac Shelby
  - Guilford Dudley Young
  - Elisah Griffen
  - Richard Lawson
  - Benajah Mallory
  - Joseph Willcocks
  - Abraham Markle
  - William McIntosh
  - Pushmataha
  - Red Jacket
  - Isaac Clark
  - George McGlassin
  - James Miller
  - George Croghan
  - George Edward Mitchell
  - William Russell
  - William Orlando Butler
  - John E. Wool
  - John Miller
  - James Wilkinson
  - Nathaniel Towson
  - John B. Campbell
  - William Henry Harrison
  - Duncan McArthur
  - Andrew Holmes
  - Daniel Bissell – American general who used the cover of the woods and tactical maneuvers to successfully raid/destroy the enemy grain and flower in the Battle of Cook's Mills.
  - William Pinkney – commanded American riflemen who concealed themselves by the shrubbery on the low ground near the river at Bladensburg bridge. Pinckney's concealed riflemen poured deadly volleys into exposed masses of British troops crossing the bridge. This is mentioned in Harper's New Monthly Magazine, Volume 28 edited by Henry Mills Alden page 439. This is also confirmed in a well documented history book Lossing's War of 1812: Lossing’s Pictorial Field Book of the War of 1812 written by Benson Lossing Chapter XXXIX.
  - Regiment of Riflemen
  - United States Rangers
  - 1st Regiment of Light Dragoons
  - 2nd Regiment of Light Dragoons
  - Canadian Volunteers
  - American Militia
  - American Privateers
  - Isaac Chauncey
  - Arthur Sinclair
  - Charles Stewart
  - Johnston Blakeley
  - William Henry Allen
  - David Porter
  - Melancthon Taylor Woolsey
  - Stephen Decatur
  - John Percival
  - Francis Gregory
  - Jesse Elliot
  - Joseph Tarbell – conducted a hit-and-run night attack on the British navy with gunboats and riflemen with mixed or limited results. This is mentioned in the history book The Encyclopedia of the War of 1812: A Political, Social, and Military History by Spencer C. Tucker page 123.
  - William Josephus Stafford
  - Joshua Hailey
  - George R. Roberts
  - Thomas Boyle
  - James DeWolf
  - Joshua Barney
  - Otway Burns
  - Bill Johnston – Canadian amphibious guerrilla/pirate who fought for the American side.
  - John Ordronaux – very successful French-born privateer who preyed on British merchant ships, outran about seventeen British warships, and brought back to the US goods worth $250,000 and $300,000.
  - J. Rowland – raided British shipping and vessels
  - Clement Cathell
  - James Barnes
  - Samuel Barstow
  - George W. Burbank
  - Nathanial Shaler
- Texas Revolution
  - American volunteers, Texan Revolutionaries, and allies
    - Sam Houston
    - William B. Travis – commander of the Texans at the Fall of the Alamo.
    - James Bowie
    - Davy Crockett – famous frontiersmen, fought and died at the Fall of the Alamo.
    - Amon B. King – Battle of Refugio
    - Ira Westover
    - William Ward
    - Richard Andrews
    - Noah Smithwick
    - Deaf Smith
    - John Coker
    - Moses Lapham
    - Moseley Baker
    - Frank W. Johnson
    - James Grant
    - Mirabeau B. Lamar
    - Juan Seguín
    - Manuel N. Flores
    - Plácido Benavides
    - John Henry Moore
  - Mexico
    - José de Urrea
    - Carlos de la Garza
    - Manuel Fernández Castrillón – used his fellow Mexican marksmen to snipe and harass the Texan insurgents in the Siege of Béxar. Mentioned in Texian Iliad: A Military History of the Texas Revolution by Stephen L. Hardin in Chapter 5.
    - Rafael Pretalia
- Seminole Wars
  - United States of America
    - William S. Harney
    - Bennet C. Riley
    - Joseph Marion Hernandez – commanded an American force that made two successful stealthy raids/assaults on the Seminoles. Mentioned in History of the Second Seminole war, 1835–1842 by John K. Mahon pages 211-214
    - Andrew Jackson – disguised his ship with a British flag to lure Hillis Hadjo into a trap and successful capture.
    - Gabriel J. Rains
  - Seminoles and their allies
    - Micanopy
    - Osceola – Native American freedom fighter
    - Thlocklo Tustenuggee
    - Billy Bowlegs
    - Ar-pi-uck-i – Seminole guerrilla leader who used cover, concealment, and evasive tactics in Lake Okeechobee, Loxahtchee, and Pine Island Ridge
    - John Horse
    - Hillis Hadjo
- Mexican–American War
  - United States of America
    - Fabius Stanly – American naval lieutenant who led raids against the Mexican armed forces.
    - Joseph Lane – United States Army American general who led a hit and run surprise attack on the Mexican armed forces at the Skirmish at Matamoros
    - John Coffee Hays – Hay's well planned ambush mentioned in Mixed Blessing: the Role of the Texas Rangers in the Mexican War, 1846–1848 written by Ian B. Lyles, pages 43–44
    - Samuel Hamilton Walker
    - Albert G. Blanchard – feigned retreat luring the Mexicans into John Coffee Hays' ambush in Mixed Blessing: the Role of the Texas Rangers in the Mexican War, 1846–1848 written by Ian B. Lyles, pages 43–44
    - Ezekiel "Stuttering Zeke" Merritt – conducted a hit-and-run raid capturing 170 horses. Mentioned in historic book Bear Flag Lieutenant: The Life Story of Henry L. Ford [1822-1860] written by Fred Blackburn Rogers page 263.
    - William B. Ide
    - Henry Ford – conducted 3 incursions/raids on enemy houses/bases destroying enemy weapons, capturing prisoners, and rescuing hostages before returning to friendly lines. Mentioned in Bear Flag Lieutenant: The Life Story of Henry L. Ford (1822–1860) written by Fred Blackburn Rogers pages 268–270.
    - Benjamin McCulloch
    - John C. Fremont
    - Tunis Craven
  - Mexico
    - Joaquín Rea
    - Antonio Canales Rosillo
    - Jose Mariano Salas – Mexican commander who commanded Mexican partisans called "Guerrillas of Vengeance" which is mentioned in the history book "U.S. Army Campaigns of the Mexican War" page 15.
    - Celedonio Dómeco de Jarauta
    - José Antonio Carrillo
    - José María Flores
    - Manuel Pineda Munoz – commanded Mexican forces that used guerrilla tactics in the Battle of Mulegé
- Utah War
  - Lot Smith
  - Daniel H. Wells
  - Brigham Young
  - Isaac C. Haight
  - John D. Lee
- Civil War
  - Confederacy
    - Bloody Bill Anderson
    - Champ Ferguson
    - William Quantrill
    - Dan Showalter
    - John Singleton Mosby
    - John Hunt Morgan
    - John Hanson McNeill – led an independent irregular Confederate military company called McNeill's Rangers commissioned under the Partisan Ranger Act
    - Earl Van Dorn
    - Adam Rankin Johnson – gained notoriety for his incursion known as the Newburgh Raid where he gained the nickname "Stovepipe Johnson"
    - Archie Clement
    - Joseph C. Porter – Confederate officer who was a key leader in the guerrilla campaigns in northern Missouri
    - John Mobberly
    - Jack Hinson – Confederate partisan sniper
    - John Jackson Dickison – at times called by scholars or historians as "the Swamp Fox of the Confederacy" or "the Confederate Swamp Fox"
    - William McWaters – Confederate guerrilla who with his fellow bushwackers conducted a successful but controversial sabotage mission known as the Platte Bridge Railroad Tragedy
    - Joseph Wheeler
    - Jubal Early
    - J. E. B. Stuart
    - Harry Gilmor
    - Mary Jane Green
    - Wade Hampton III
    - Richard Montgomery Gano
    - Stand Watie
    - James Iredell Waddell
    - Raphael Semmes
  - Union
    - John Brown
    - Charles R. Jennison
    - James H. Lane
    - Daniel R. Anthony
    - Newton Knight
    - Owen Brown
    - Benjamin Grierson
    - William B. Cushing
    - Samuel C. Means – captain of the Loudoun Rangers
    - Henry Young
    - Harriet Tubman – female African American who infiltrated slave territory bringing slaves to safe zones, played a major role in the Raid on Combahee Ferry, and provided critical intelligence to the Union.
    - James Montgomery – Union Jayhawker who was in command of the Union forces in the Raid on Combahee Ferry and conducted other raids against the confederates.
    - Henry Baxter
    - James J. Andrews
    - Abel Streight
    - Hugh Judson Kilpatrick
    - Gouverneur K. Warren – Union Army general who executed a deadly ambush in the Battle of Bristoe Station
    - William Henry Powell
    - William W. Averell
    - Samuel P. Carter
    - George W. Taylor
    - Samuel P. Cox
    - George Stoneman
    - James H. Wilson
    - Thomas R. Kerr
    - John R. Kelso – his exploits of covert guerilla-like actions are mentioned in his book Bloody Engagements: John R. Kelso's Civil War written by himself.
    - Ishmael Day
    - Theophilus Lyle Dickey
    - James Madison Wells
    - Malinda Blalock
    - Daniel Ellis
    - Fielding Hurst
    - Christopher Haun
    - Edward E. Potter
    - Seth Ledyard Phelps
    - Opothleyahola
    - William Sloan Tough
- Powder River Expedition (1865)
  - United States
    - Patrick E. Connor – American brigadier general who led a surprise raid-like incursion in the Battle of the Tongue River; the incursion has had some controversy and debate.
    - Jim Bridger – army scout alongside Frank North who scouted and discovered the Arapaho village allowing Patrick E. Connor to make his controversial surprise attack in the Battle of the Tongue River
    - Frank North – led a successful dawn surprise-like attack with his Pawnee Scouts on the Cheyenne which became known as the Powder River Massacre which also might have some controversy or debate.
  - Native Americans
    - Red Cloud – very important leader of the Oglala Lakota people.
    - Dull Knife – great chief of the Cheyenne who alongside Red Cloud harassed the Americans at the Battle of Bone Pile Creek.
    - Sitting Bull
    - Roman Nose – alongside Sitting Bull led the Native Americans in ambushing, harassing, and skirmishing against the U.S. armed forces in the Powder River Battles
- Snake War
  - United States
    - George Crook
    - Billy Chinook – chief and member of the Wasco tribe and served the United States as a First Sergeant of the U.S. Army Wasco Scouts
  - Native Americans
    - Paulina (Paiute leader)
    - Wahveveh
- Great Sioux War of 1876
  - United States
    - Ranald S. Mackenzie
    - George Crook
    - Frank North – organized and commanded the Pawnee Scouts
    - Wesley Merritt – planned an ambush which let to little to no high body count in the Battle of Warbonnet Creek
  - Native Americans
    - Crazy Horse
    - Sitting Bull
    - Little Wolf
    - American Horse (elder)
- Apache Wars
  - United States
    - George Crook
    - George Morton Randall – American Captain who led a well coordinated surprise attack on the Apache and their allies in the Battle of Turret Peak.
    - James Henry Tevis – pioneer who led a militia of 30 men in a surprise attack on the Apache in the Battle of the Mimbres River
    - James H. Whitlock – Battle of Mount Gray
    - Al Sieber
    - Howard B. Cushing
    - Nantaje
  - Apache and their allies
    - Flechas Rayada
    - Mangas Coloradas – Apache tribal chief who led raids and ambushes against the Mexicans and Americans
    - Cochise – chief or leader of the Chokonen band of the Chiricahua Apache who also led raids and ambushes against the Mexicans and Americans
    - Victorio
    - Nana (chief)
    - Chato (Apache)
    - Juh
    - Baishan (Apache)
    - Geronimo – Native American freedom fighter
- Philippine–American War
  - Frederick Funston – American brigadier general who planned, led, and executed the raid that captured Emilio Aguinaldo.
  - United States Armed Forces – led a rear surprise attack/ambush decimating an army of would be ambushers in the Battle of Lonoy
  - Elwell Stephen Otis – American commander of a hit-and-run raid-like mission that successfully destroyed a Filipino artillery gun in the Battle of Olongapo
  - Hiram I. Bearss
- World War 1
  - Theodore Roosevelt Jr. – planned and ordered a successful raid at Cantigny that captured 33 prisoners and documents with intelligence. This is mentioned in Infantry in Battle by Charles T. Lanham, pages 43–47
  - Michael Valente
  - John L. Barkley – his exploit of surprising/ambushing and decimating an army of Germans are mentioned in his memoir written by himself and an article One Man’s Ambush written by Edward G. Lengel
  - Hiram I. Bearss
- United States occupation of the Dominican Republic
  - James P. Parker
  - Richard Wainwright – was in command of a commando amphibious raid in the Santo Domingo Affair
  - Ernest Calvin Williams – American marine who led a commando like assault in the Battle of San Francisco de Macoris
  - Albert S. Mclemore
- United States occupation of Nicaragua
  - Chesty Puller
  - Harold C. Roberts – surprised bandits, used fire and maneuver tactics including use of cover, and attempted an ambush.
  - Evans Carlson
  - Merritt Edson
  - Wilburt S. Brown
- United States occupation of Haiti
  - Herman H. Hanneken
  - William Robert Button
  - Chesty Puller
  - Gerald C. Thomas
  - Smedley Butler
  - Ross Lindsey Iams – took part with Samuel Gross in Smedley Butler's surprise raid like commando assault in the Battle of Fort Rivière
  - Samuel Gross
- World War II
  - Aaron Bank – famous officer of the Office of Strategic Services who is considered the founder of the United States Army Special Forces also known as the "Green Berets".
  - Donald Blackburn – American advisor to the Philippine Commonwealth Army who conducted a guerrilla insurgency on the island of Luzon against the Japanese.
  - James M. Cushing
  - Evans Carlson – commander of the Marine Raiders whose notable unconventional warfare type of successes were the Raid on Makin Island and the Carlson's patrol.
  - William Orlando Darby – United States Army officer who led the famous "Darby's Rangers" which would evolve into the U.S. Army Rangers.
  - Joseph Beyrle – American paratrooper who conducted his own sabotage like warfare behind German lines before fighting alongside the Red Army after escaping German captivity a few times.
  - Merritt Edson
  - Carl F. Eifler
  - Wendell Fertig – American civil engineer who organized and commanded an America-Filipino guerrilla army on the Japanese – occupied, southern Philippine island of Mindanao.
  - Roger Hilsman – American who served in the Merrill's Marauders and then with the Office of Strategic Services as a guerrilla leader in the China Burma India Theater of World War II
  - Virginia Hall – American female spy who worked as an agent for the American Office of Strategic Services in Europe after previously working for the British Special Operations Executive.
  - William R. Peers
  - Russell W. Volckmann – United States Army infantry officer and a leader of the guerrilla resistance in the Philippines and considered a co-founder of the United States Army Special Forces
  - Hugh B. Miller – U.S. naval officer stranded on an island who systematically ambushed and attacked Japanese soldiers with just hand grenades and a bayonet.
  - Robert Prince – American officer in the U.S. Army's 6th Ranger Battalion who was the main architect of the plan for the Raid at Cabanatuan.
  - Henry Mucci – colonel of United States Army Rangers who led the Raid at Cabanatuan with Robert Prince as the planner of the mission.
  - Peter J. Ortiz
  - Ray C. Hunt
  - Victor H. Krulak
  - Edwin Ramsey
  - Iliff David Richardson
  - Arthur W. Wermuth
  - Robert Lapham
  - Jack Hendrick Taylor – sometimes considered or referred to as the "first Navy SEAL".
  - Richard Winters – took part in an ambush against a German horse drawn supply convoy. Mentioned in Band of Brothers: E Company, 506th Regiment, 101st Airborne, from Normandy to Hitler's Eagle's Nest written by Stephen E. Ambrose page 91. Also mentioned in Brothers in Battle, Best of Friends written by Dick Hill pages 62–64. Conducted a commando-like hit-and-run raid destroying four artillery guns successfully in the Brécourt Manor Assault. And successfully ambushed and wiped out a 7-man German machine gun crew at another battle. Mentioned in Beyond Band of Brothers: The War Memoirs of Major Dick Winters written by Dick Winters pages 137–138.
  - William Guarnere
  - Chick Parsons
  - Arthur D. Simons
  - Samuel V. Wilson
  - Vincent R. Kramer
  - Clyde A. Thomason
  - Jack Hawkins
  - John H. Yancey
  - Oscar F. Peatross
  - Robert Halperin
  - Elizabeth Peet McIntosh
  - Serge Obolensky
  - Walter R. Mansfield
- Korean War
  - Donald Nichols
  - Merrill Newman
  - Colt Terry – whose experience of unconventional warfare in the Korean War before becoming a Green Beret are shown in Colt Terry, Green Beret written by Charles D. Patton published at the Texas A&M University Press
  - Robert H. Barrow – came up with a cunning tactic that allow his marines to ambush/surprise and kill more than 50 enemy troops. Mentioned in U.S. Marines in the Korean War by Charles Richard Smith pages 203-204
  - Colonel John McGee
  - Tony Poe
  - Vincent R. Kramer
  - Charles George
  - Eugene F. Clark
  - Underwater Demolition Teams
  - Korean War Ranger Companies
  - JACK
  - CIA SAC
  - 2nd Battalion, 1st Marines
- Vietnam War
  - Rudy Boesch – operative in Seal Team 2 in Vietnam War
  - David Hackworth – involved in the creation and command of Tiger Force
  - Carlos Hathcock – United States Marine Corps Scout Sniper who has 93 confirmed kills
  - Tony Poe – legendary paramilitary officer in Vietnam from the CIA's Special Activities Division
  - Colt Terry – one of the original Green Berets whose successful unconventional type of warfare exploits are mentioned in his official biography Colt Terry, Green Beret written by Charles D. Patton published at the Texas A&M University Press.
  - Roy Boehm – first officer in charge of Seal Team two.
  - Richard J. Meadows
  - John Plaster
  - Richard Marcinko
  - Ira A. Hunt Jr.
  - George Bacon
  - Michael D. Healy
  - Billy Waugh
  - Harry Griffith Cramer Jr.
  - Thomas R. Norris
  - Robert J. Pruden
  - Arthur D. Simons
  - William Colby
  - Edward James Land
  - Chuck Mawhinney
  - Henry Kissinger – Campaign 139
  - Billy Walkabout
- Laotian Civil War
  - George Bacon
  - James William Lair
  - Pat Landry
  - Bill Young
  - Tony Poe – legendary paramilitary officer in Vietnam from the CIA's Special Activities Division
  - Dick Holm
- United States invasion of Grenada
  - Stephen Trujillo
  - Delta Force
  - SEAL Team Six
  - 75th Ranger Regiment
- United States Invasion of Panama
  - Larry Vickers
  - Eldon Bargewell
  - Gary L. Harrell
  - Peter Schoomaker
  - Delta Force
  - American Navy SEALs
  - American 7th SFG
- War in Afghanistan
  - Matt Bissonnette
  - Brandon Webb
  - Robert J. O'Neill
  - Nicholas Irving
  - Edward Byers
  - Robert Harward
  - Francis J. Wiercinski – took part in a successful ambush wiping out nine enemy combatants while commanding his unit alongside a U.S. Special Operations Force team. Mentioned in A Different Kind of War: The US Army in Operation Enduring Freedom: October 2001 – September 2005 by Donald Wright pages 148–149.
  - Joseph Votel
  - Jonathan Idema – controversial American non commissioned reserve special operations vigilante.
  - Brent Bennett
  - Jason Amerine
  - Gary Berntsen
  - Gary Schroen
  - Jim Gant
  - Ann Scott Tyson
  - Marcus Luttrell
  - 4th Brigade Combat Team, 82nd Airborne Division
  - 2nd Ranger Battalion
  - 3rd Ranger Battalion
  - 26th Infantry Regiment
  - Delta Force
  - Seal Team 6
- Iraq War
  - Kevin Lacz
  - Rorke Denver
  - Chris Kyle
  - Robert J. O'Neill
  - Carl Higbie – led the raid capturing the Butcher of Fallujah. Author of Enemies, Foreign & Domestic: A SEAL's Story and Battle on the Home Front.
  - Ethan Place
  - Tyrone S. Woods
  - Jocko Willink
  - Thomas Payne – took part in a successful commando raid that rescued 70 prisoners and killed 20 enemies in Operation Inherent Resolve.
  - Joshua Wheeler
  - Michael A. Monsoor
  - Jack Coughlin
  - 162nd Infantry Regiment
  - Delta Force
  - Seal Team 6
- Symbionese Liberation Army
  - Donald DeFreeze
  - Camilla Hall
  - Emily Harris
  - Patricia Soltysik
  - Willie Wolfe
- Weather Underground
  - List of Weatherman members
- Black Panther Party
  - Huey P. Newton
- Others
  - Michael G. Vickers – legendary paramilitary officer in first Afghan war from the CIA's Special Activities Division
  - Touch the Clouds – Native American warrior
  - Orlando Bosch – Cuba, America and South America
  - Nat Turner – leader of slave rebellion
  - Daniel Boone – famous frontiersmen, Indian fighter, and American Revolutionary War hero.
  - Billy the Kid
  - Railroad Bill
  - Devil Anse Hatfield
  - James–Younger Gang
  - Jesse James
  - Cole Younger
  - Apache Kid – renegade Apache during the Renegade period of the Apache Wars
  - Pancho Villa
  - Queho
  - Robert Clay Allison
  - Ike Clanton
  - Billy Clanton
  - John Henry "Doc" Holliday
  - Dangerfield Newby
  - Daniel Shays
  - Denmark Vesey
  - Dan Seavey – also known as "Roaring" Dan Seavey" who was a notorious timber pirate involved in poaching, human trafficking, and hijacking etc.
  - Lewis Wetzel – scout, frontiersman, and Indian fighter
  - William Hardin – American Revolutionary War soldier, farmer, rancher, marksman, hunter, and Native American killer
  - John L. Bullis
  - James Smith
  - Grayston Lynch
  - Edward Lansdale
  - Frederick Russell Burnham

== Uruguay ==
| Guerrilla leader | Movement | War |
|---|---|---|
| José Mujica | Tupamaros | Civic-military dictatorship of Uruguay |
| Raúl Sendic | Tupamaros | Civic-military dictatorship of Uruguay |

== Venezuela ==
- Gustavo Machado Morales - founder of the Communist Party of Venezuela
- Rafael Simón Urbina - Venezuelan rebel who waged a guerrilla insurgency against the dictator Juan Vicente Gómez
- José Dionisio Cisneros
- José Manuel Hernández
- Rafael de Nogales
- Douglas Bravo
- Carlos the Jackal
- Teodoro Petkoff
- Narciso Lopez
- Olga Luzardo
- Fabricio Ojeda
- Paul del Rio

== Vietnam ==
| Guerrilla leader | Movement | War |
|---|---|---|
| Ho Chi Minh | Vietminh | Indochina War |
| Võ Nguyên Giáp | Vietminh | Indochina War |

== Western Sahara ==
| Guerrilla leader | Movement | War |
|---|---|---|
| Mohamed Abdelaziz | Polisario | Western Sahara War |
| Ma al-'Aynayn | Qadiriyya | French conquest of Morocco |
| El-Ouali Mustapha Sayed | Polisario | Western Sahara War |
| Brahim Gali | Polisario | Western Sahara War |

== Yugoslavia ==
| Guerrilla leader | Movement | War |
|---|---|---|
| Draža Mihailović | Royal Patriotic Army of Yugoslavia | Balkans in World War II |
| Josip Broz Tito | Yugoslav Partisans | Balkans in World War II |

== Zimbabwe ==
| Guerrilla leader | Movement | War |
|---|---|---|
| Joshua Nkomo | ZAPU | Rhodesian Civil War |
| Robert Mugabe | ZANU | Rhodesian Civil War |

== See also ==
- List of condottieri
- List of conquistadors
- List of guerrilla movements
- List of military commanders
- List of revolutions and rebellions
- List of samurai
- List of usurpers
- Blitzkrieg
- Oliver Cromwell
- Hajduk
- Klepht
- Maoism
- Martial Race
- Nonviolence
- Partisan (military)
- Reagan Doctrine
- Erwin Rommel
