= Mangwal =

Mangwal may refer to:

- Mangwal, Afghanistan, a village
- Mangwal, Pakistan, a village and union council
- Mangwal Assembly constituency, a former assembly constituency in India
