= Nakhonay =

- Interactive map of Nakhonay
- Coordinates: 31°30′11″N 65°33′45″E

Nakhunay or Nakhuni (Pashto: ناخونی) is a village in the Panjwai District of Kandahar, Afghanistan. The village is located approximately 15 kilometres southwest of Kandahar City. Since the 2000s, the village has endured numerous brutal attacks. The violence intensified on January 4th, 2008, when the Afghan Local Police killed four Taliban members and detained eleven others for the first time.

Nakhuni is known as the birthplace of the current Supreme Leader of Afghanistan, Mawlawi Hibatullah Akhundzada.

== See also ==
- Kandahar Province
- Hibatullah Akhundzada
