= Howard Maupin =

Howard Maupin (c. 1815–1887) was an American settler who established a farm and ferry in Oregon at the present-day location of Maupin. He became famous for shooting the Paiute war leader Chief Paulina on April 25, 1867, near the modern town of Madras.

Maupin was born in Clay County, Kentucky, and moved to Missouri as a teenager. In 1863, he traveled to Oregon, settling first in the Willamette Valley. He then moved to Antelope, in central Oregon, where he became the town's first postmaster in 1871. Maupin then moved slightly west, establishing a farm and operating a ferry across the Deschutes River. The city of Maupin was named in his honor by the city's founder, William H. Staats, early in the 20th century; the original name Maupin's Ferry was shortened by postal authorities. He died in 1887.
