= Chepo expedition =

1679 pirate voyage

The Chepo expedition was a pirate voyage led by Spanish renegades Juan Guartem, Eduardo Blomar and Bartolomé Charpes in the Spanish Main during 1679. Sailing up the Mandinga River, the expedition crossed the Isthmus of Panama into the Pacific where they raided shipping for several months as well as looting and then burning the town of Chepo, Panama. They were tried in absentia by the Viceroy of Bogotá and on his orders were burned in effigy at Santa Fe de Bogotá. However, the three continued committing piracy on both coasts of Central America and were never caught for their crimes. This was the second major expedition following the "Pacific Adventure" led by John Coxon that same year.

In an official communication by the Governor of Panama Don Dionicio Alceda in 1743, he recalled the incident writing "This passage was effected in the year 1679 by the arch pirates Juan Guartem, Eduardo Blomar and Bartolomé Charpes. These freebooters were tried for their crimes by audience of the viceroyalty, and as they could not be in person to suffer the just punishment, they were burned in effigy at Santa Fé (de Bogota), while they were yet ravaging the settlement on both sides the Isthmus".
