= Jim Gant =

American military officer

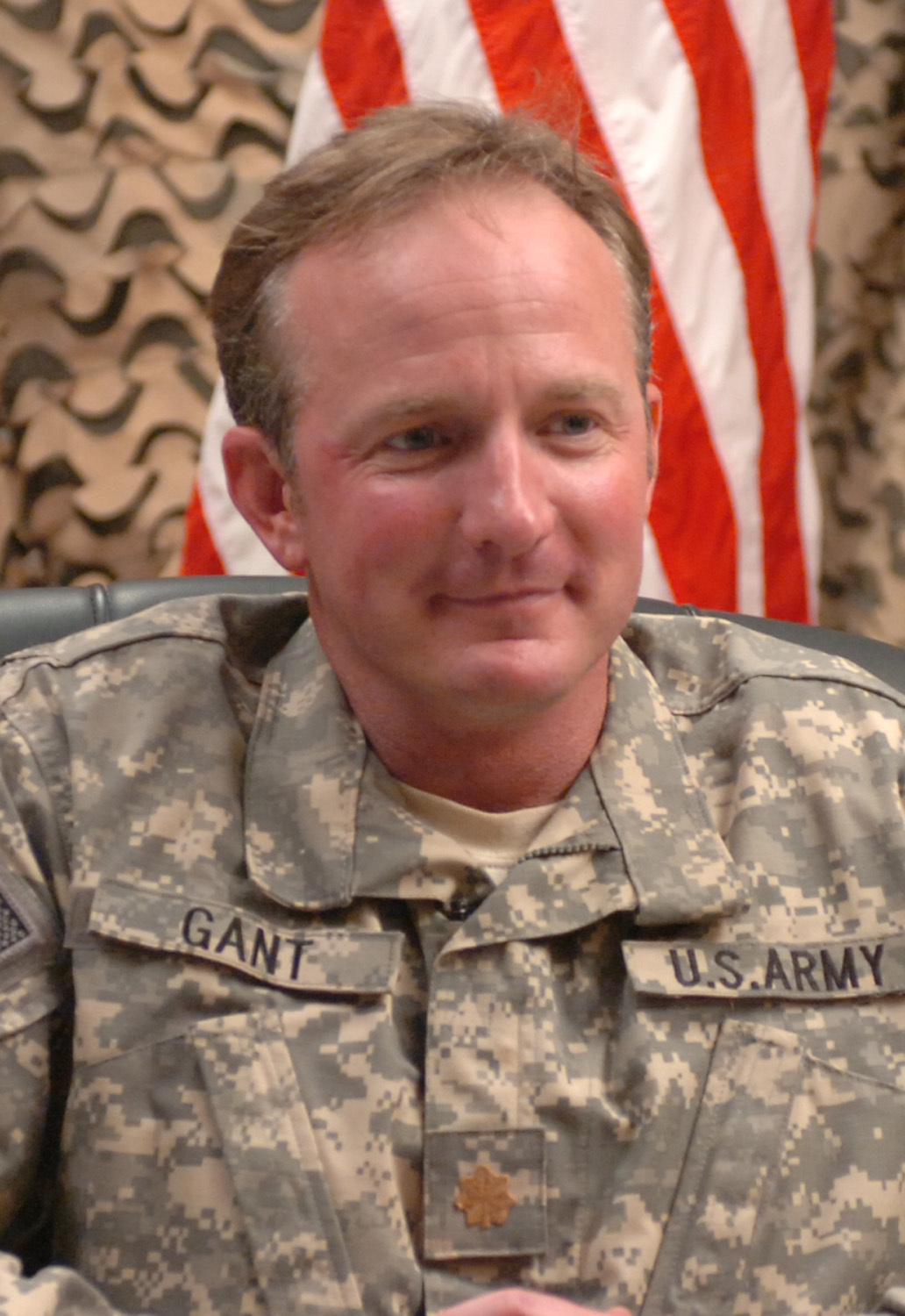
- Gant interviewed at Camp Liberty in 2007
- Born: Las Cruces, New Mexico
- Spouse: Ann Scott Tyson
- Military career
- Allegiance: United States
- Branch: United States Army
- Rank: Major
- Unit: 3rd Special Forces Group
- Conflicts: Gulf War; Iraq War; War in Afghanistan
- Awards: Silver Star; Joint Service Commendation Medal; Bronze Star with "V" device; Purple Heart

Jim Gant is a former United States Army Special Forces officer. He served for over 50 months in combat in Iraq and Afghanistan and was wounded seven times. He was awarded a Silver Star for his actions in the Iraq War in 2007, and wrote an influential monograph on Afghanistan titled One Tribe at a Time: A Strategy for Success in Afghanistan. Following his last deployment in 2010–12, he was relieved of command and forced to retire after violating military regulations and conducting an extramarital affair with reporter Ann Scott Tyson at his combat outpost in Kunar Province, Afghanistan. Gant has been credited with inspiring the creation of the Afghan Local Police and the strategy of Village Stability Operations in Afghanistan.

== Military career ==
Gant grew up in Las Cruces, New Mexico. He enlisted in the Army in 1986 and became a Special Forces communications sergeant, participating in the Gulf War as an advisor to Egyptian forces.

Gant later became an officer and deployed as a captain to Afghanistan in 2003 and 2004 and Iraq in 2006–7. Leading Operational Detachment Alpha 316, Gant deployed to Kunar Province, Afghanistan in spring 2003 and was based at Forward Operating Base Asadabad. Gant's team was one of the first American units to enter the Korengal Valley. They also operated in Mangwal and built a strong relationship with the Mohmand tribe and its malik, Noor Afzal. Gant returned from Kunar in October 2003 but deployed again, to Helmand Province, in 2004.

Gant also served in Iraq for 13 months in 2006–7, advising an Iraqi Police battalion. On December 11, 2006, Gant's team in Iraq was attacked in a complex ambush on the road between Balad and Baghdad. On May 3, 2007, Gant was awarded a Silver Star for valor for his actions during the 2006 ambush.

=== One Tribe at a Time ===
In October 2009, Gant wrote an influential paper titled One Tribe at a Time: A Strategy for Success in Afghanistan. Gant first published the paper on the website of Stephen Pressfield, a historical fiction novelist who is popular in military circles. The paper reached a wider audience after its publication on the Small Wars Journal website. In One Tribe at a Time, Gant argued that the United States should leverage the Pashtun tribal system in Afghanistan by creating "Tribal Engagement Teams" that would embed at the village level and work with locals to build security.

General David Petraeus called the paper "very impressive," and General Stanley McChrystal distributed it to all commanders in Afghanistan. The paper received some criticism for promoting "nativist mythologies" but, according to Paula Broadwell, it helped inspire Petraeus to create the Afghan Local Police. Admiral Eric T. Olson, the commander of United States Special Operations Command, supported Gant's concept as well, and in November 2009 Lieutenant General John Mulholland offered Gant an opportunity to redeploy to Afghanistan to implement his ideas.

=== Final deployment ===
Gant returned to Afghanistan in June 2010, and was stationed in the village of Mangwal where he had served in 2003. In September 2010, reporter Ann Scott Tyson took a leave of absence from The Washington Post and went to Kunar to live with Gant for nine months, in violation of military regulations.

Gant and his unit built relationships with the tribes by wearing traditional Afghan clothing instead of uniforms and learning Pashto. Gant himself carried Islamic prayer beads, rode on horseback, and had Pashto words tattooed on his wrists. He remained in Kunar for 22 months and achieved significant operational success. General Petraeus called him "the perfect counterinsurgent" and compared him favorably to T. E. Lawrence, calling him "Lawrence of Afghanistan." Petraeus made Mangwal a "showcase" for his counterinsurgency strategy, and congressional delegations such as those of Lindsey Graham and John McCain visited the village. By the middle of 2011, Gant had recruited 1,300 Afghan Local Police. At the same time, Gant was suffering from severe post-traumatic stress disorder. He allegedly drank alcohol during the deployment, which is prohibited by Army regulations, and "self-medicated" with pain medication.

In early 2012, as Gant was in the process of moving from Mangwal to the nearby village of Chowkay, he came in contact with First Lieutenant Thomas Roberts, a West Point graduate who had recently arrived to Kunar. Roberts reported to his chain of command that Gant was engaging in "immoral and illegal activities and actions". After the subsequent investigation Gant was relieved of command, demoted to the rank of captain, and given an official reprimand by Lieutenant General Mulholland. He retired from the military soon afterwards.

Gant's actions led him to be compared to Colonel Kurtz from the 1979 film Apocalypse Now. During his career he served for over 50 months in combat in Iraq and Afghanistan and was wounded seven times. After the death of Osama bin Laden, U.S. forces found a copy of One Tribe at a Time in bin Laden's compound, along with a document in which bin Laden mentioned Gant by name and said that he "needed to be removed from the battlefield". Gant has been credited with inspiring the Village Stability Operations (VSO) strategy which was widely employed by special operations forces in Afghanistan.

== Later life ==
Tyson and Gant have married and live in Seattle, Washington. In 2014, Tyson wrote a book about Gant titled American Spartan: The Promise, the Mission, and the Betrayal of Special Forces Major Jim Gant. In 2021, Gant participated in the efforts of Task Force Pineapple to evacuate Afghan allies during the Fall of Kabul.

== Bibliography ==
- Edwards, David (2020). "'The perfect counterinsurgent': reconsidering the case of Major Jim Gant". Small Wars & Insurgencies. 31 (2): 420–444. doi:10.1080/09592318.2020.1713554. S2CID 214296335.
- Morgan, Wesley (2021). The Hardest Place: The American Military Adrift in Afghanistan's Pech Valley. Random House Publishing Group. p. 26. ISBN 978-0-8129-9506-0.
