= Feliks Ankerstein =

Polish Army major and intelligence officer

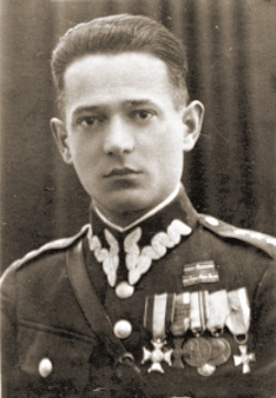
Feliks Ankerstein

Feliks Józef Ankerstein (1897 – ? 1955) was a Polish Army major and intelligence officer.

== Career ==
Ankerstein served during World War I in the Polish Legions and the Polish Military Organization, and after the war in the Polish Army. He participated in the Silesian Uprisings.

He became an officer in Section II of the Polish General Staff (the intelligence section), serving as deputy to the chief of its Office 2, Edmund Charaszkiewicz (1929–39), and as a member of the secret K-7 organization (Komitet Siedmiu, "Committee of Seven") that supervised certain covert operations.

He was engaged in covert operations from 16 September 1928, including the 1938 annexation of Trans-Olza and operations conducted in autumn 1938 in collaboration with Hungary in Carpathian Rus.

After the invasion of Poland in September 1939, Ankerstein worked in Section II's Office (Ekspozytura) "R" in Romania. He later made his way to London, where he reportedly about 1940 entered the service of British intelligence.

After the war, he remained abroad.

== See also ==
- Edmund Charaszkiewicz
- Wiktor Tomir Drymmer
- List of Poles
- List of guerrillas
