= Arbaki =

Group within a Pashtun tribe

The Arbaki (Pashto: اربکي, singular اربکی) are a voluntary group within a Pashtun tribe which implement the orders of a jirga and operate similarly to a police force.

== History ==
In Pashtun tribal society, the primary role of the Arbaki was to maintain stability. Arbaki operated like police forces, and did not enter into the territories of other tribes. The term "Arbaki" comes from the Pashto word for "messenger". Pashtuns described the concept of Arbaki as a voluntary group of adults who are specially selected, who carry out their responsibilities and implement the decisions of the Jirga, and to secure their tribal territory and take action against violations of law. Arbaki were traditionally formed by request of a jirga, and sometimes take orders from multiple jirgas at community, clan or tribe level. Higher jirgas intervene when a dispute needs rises upwards. The jirga provided logistical and financial support to the arbaki, although the Arbaki members traditionally did not accept payment. Jirgas used a system in which one of every forty mirah (men who embody Pashtunwali) in a tribe were selected to serve as Arbaki. Arbaki were not always armed and some specialised in implementing Pashtunwali. Arbaki who acted by jirga mandate and killed someone while performing duties were generally exempt from badal, a Pashtunwali principle which espoused reciprocal killings.

The Islamic Republic of Afghanistan had paid and supported the Arbaki, and mobilised them alongside the Afghan Local Police. During the 2001-2021 War in Afghanistan, there were instances of Arbaki violence towards civilians. The Arbaki maintained stability in Pashtun regions, and the Afghan government attempted to implement the Arbaki system among different ethnic groups, although it ultimately failed.
