= Billy Chinook =

- Born: c. 1827; North central, Oregon
- Died: December 9, 1890 (aged 62–63); Warm Springs Indian Reservation, Oregon, United States
- Education: Columbian College
- Organization: Tribe: Wasco
- Known for: Guiding Frémont expeditions
- Awards: President's peace and friendship medal

Billy Chinook was a chief and member of the Wasco tribe. Chinook was a guide for John C. Frémont and Kit Carson, who explored Central Oregon from 1843 to 1844 and from 1845 to 1847. Chinook also served as First Sergeant, U.S. Army Wasco Scouts during the Snake War. Lake Billy Chinook in Oregon is named in his honor.

== Early years ==
Billy Chinook (aka William Parker) was born circa 1827 in the area that was to become Fort Dalles, Oregon Territory. He was baptized by Reverend Daniel Lee of the Wascopam Mission, which was a part of the Methodist Mission in the Oregon Country. Chinook was an orphan and lived at the mission.

== Frémont expeditions ==
In the summer of 1843, then-Lieutenant John C. Frémont and Kit Carson visited the present-day Bend, Oregon, and The Dalles, Oregon, areas. Chinook was 16 to 19 years old at the time and was recruited by Frémont as a guide. The Frémont expedition (Frémont's second) then explored central Oregon and the Klamath Basin, and further into present-day Nevada and California areas through July 1844.

In 1845 Frémont traveled to Washington, D.C., with Chinook. While there, Frémont awarded a medal to Chinook which bore the likeness of the President and the inscription: Martin Van Buren President of the United States A.D. 1845 on the obverse. The reverse has an image of clasped hands (U.S. military and Native), a tomahawk crossed with a peace pipe and the words Peace and Friendship. While in Washington, D.C., Chinook studied English at Columbian College (now George Washington University).

Chinook then traveled to Philadelphia, Pennsylvania, where he lived with the Quaker family of Dr. Caspar Wistar, and studied English further. When Frémont departed for his Third Expedition to the Far West on June 1, 1845, Chinook accompanied him again as a guide. He quit Frémont's expedition in June 1847 while in northern California.

== Tribal advocacy years ==
Chinook spent the next few years in California, marrying a Californian/Mexican woman and acquiring a large herd of California/Mexican cattle. By 1851 he had returned to his native village near The Dalles and settled on a land claim on Mill Creek. Chinook began to assist his people using his English skills.

In 1853 Chinook wrote a letter to Joel Palmer, Oregon Superintendent of Indian Affairs asking him to protect native lands at The Dalles area from encroachment by non-native settlers. In 1855 he represented the Wasco Nation at treaty negotiations with the U.S. government. He was one of three elected Chiefs of the Wasco Nation, representing the Dalles Wasco. He was a signatory to the treaty that established the Warm Springs Reservation. Chinook lost his land claim at Mill Creek in 1856 and removed to the Warm Springs Reservation.

== U.S. Army career ==
Chinook enlisted as Acting First Sergeant in Captain John Darragh's Company of 50 U.S. Army Indian Scouts in 1866 for a term of 1 year during the Snake War. First Sergeant Chinook participated in the first battle of the war in present-day Crook County, Oregon.

In 1866 Chief Paulina, his half-brother Chief Wahveveh and a third brother, Oitsiof of the Northern Paiute tribe directed their warriors to kill Wasco Chief Queapama. The Paiutes had a long history of conflict with the Wascos and other Columbia River tribes. Chief Queapama was murdered by the Paiutes during a feigned parley at the Warm Springs Reservation, Oregon. The Wasco Scouts joined with regular army units in pursuing Paulina around the middle Deschutes country from 1864 until 1867.

In summer of 1866 Chinook was encamped with Captain (Dr.) William Cameron McKay, U.S. Army Wasco Scouts at McKay Creek; he departed base camp on patrol with a detachment of 25 scouts. At Dry Creek in now Crook County, Oregon, approximately 13 miles from present day Prineville, Oregon, they came upon a band of encamped Paiutes. Chinook had orders not to engage with the Paiutes while on patrol. They reconnoitered the area, counting fires and tents to assess the number of Paiutes. At dawn, when the first cooking fires were observed, Chinook's detachment attacked and killed all 32 Paiutes in the camp. Chinook's scouts thus avenged the death of Chief Queapama, albeit they disobeyed orders.

On September 16, 1866, Chief Paulina and 14 Paiute warriors attacked the James N. Clark ranch in the vicinity of Bridge Creek and the John Day River. Mrs. Clark was not present at the ranch-house, and her husband and her brother were by the river. The Paiutes spotted the men and gave chase; however, the men escaped. The warriors looted and burned the ranch. Subsequently, Chinook and his Wasco scouts tracked Chief Paulina to an area near Harney Lake by Steens Mountain Oregon. Chief Paulina and his warriors retreated to a cave protected by boulders. Chief Paulina's half-brother Chief Wahveveh and two of his warriors were killed while Chief Paulina and the others escaped.

== Retirement ==
Chinook lived at the Warm Springs Reservation after his discharge from the army. He continued to champion the cause of the Wasco Nation until his death on December 9, 1890. He is buried in the reservation cemetery and his epitaph reads in part: A faithful and true friend of the white man.

== Lake Billy Chinook ==
The Confederated Tribes of Warm Springs named the reservoir at the Round Butte Dam in honor of Billy Chinook in the area where he guided Frémont and Carson. Lake Billy Chinook extends beyond the boundaries of The Cove Palisades State Park in Oregon. Jordan Road Falls, a waterfall which plunges 160 feet into Lake Billy Chinook from the precipice of Crooked River Canyon, is known locally (unofficially) as Billy Chinook Falls.
