= Ann Scott Tyson =

American journalist

- Education: Harvard College; Columbia University
- Occupation: Journalist
- Known for: War-correspondent
- Notable work: American Spartan: The Promise, the Mission, and the Betrayal of Special Forces Major Jim Gant
- Spouse: Jim Gant

Ann Scott Tyson is an American journalist, reporting from combat zones since the invasion of Iraq, and recently from Asia. She has written for The Christian Science Monitor, The Washington Post, The Wall Street Journal and The Seattle Times.

== Biography ==
=== Early life and career ===
Tyson is a graduate of Harvard University with an honors degree in government and has studied economics and business at Columbia University.

Tyson covered the Iraq and Afghanistan wars for over a decade, she also covered Asia and China for eight years, as well as the Pentagon, Congress, and the Midwest United States. As of 2020 Tyson serves as the Beijing Bureau Chief for the Christian Science Monitor.

Fellow journalist Amelia Newcomb wrote that Tyson "is one of those rare multifaceted journalists who reports with fearlessness and sensitivity. She can report alongside troops at war or sit down with Melinda Gates, ... and get her to open up about spirituality and her life journey."

=== Relation with Jim Gant ===
In September 2010, Tyson took a leave of absence from The Washington Post and went to Kunar to live with United States Army Special Forces officer Jim Gant for nine months, in violation of military regulations. She first had spoken with Gant in 2007 over the phone and described him as "the Green Beret who could win the war in Afghanistan". Gant had a reputation mobilizing local tribes against the Taliban, and was reportedly extremely successful, but was fired for his relationship with Tyson. In 2014 Tyson published a book about Gant titled American Spartan: The Promise, the Mission, and the Betrayal of Special Forces Major Jim Gant.

Tyson and Gant have married and live in Seattle, Washington.

== Books ==
- Chinese Awakenings: Life Stories from the Unofficial China (1995) Westview Press ISBN 9780813324739
- American Spartan: The Promise, the Mission, and the Betrayal of Special Forces Major Jim Gant (2014) William Morrow ISBN 9780062114983
