= Wahveveh =

Chief Wahveveh, also spelled Wewawewa (died 1866) was a Northern Paiute warrior and half-brother of Chief Paulina.

During the raids of the 1860s in Central Oregon, Wahveveh aided his brother in attacks on the Warm Springs Chief, Poustaminie. His tribe, the Tyghs, were attacked by Wahveveh's band while they were building a bridge. During the skirmish Poustaminie approached the Paiutes and laid down his weapons to show his peaceful intentions but Wahveveh had him killed by one of his braves. In a related incident taken on by his brother Chief Paulina, a scouting party was organized for the intention of vengeance for Paulina's murder of Wasco Chief Queapama. This party was led by First Sergeant Billy Chinook and other Wasco Scouts of the U.S. Army. They attacked a Paiute camp at Dry Creek, capturing or killing all 32 Paiutes. The scouting party also located Paulina above Lake Henry on Steens Mountain. Paulina retreated to a cave protected by boulders but Chief Wahveveh and two other Paiutes were not able to escape and were killed by the Wascos.

Wahvevah and Paulina had a third brother, Oitsi, who also fought alongside them.
