= Mangwal Assembly constituency =

Constituency of the Himachal Pradesh legislative assembly in India

Coordinates: 32.215°N 75.764°E

Mangwal
- Former constituency for the Himachal Pradesh Legislative Assembly

Constituency details
- Country: India
- Region: North India
- State: Himachal Pradesh
- District: Kangra
- Established: 1972
- Abolished: 1972
- Total electors: 27,417

Mangwal was an assembly constituency in the India state of Himachal Pradesh.

== Members of the Legislative Assembly ==
Election	Member	Party
1972	Churamani	Indian National Congress

== Election results ==
=== Assembly Election 1972 ===
1972 Himachal Pradesh Legislative Assembly election: Mangwal
Party	Candidate	Votes	%	±%
INC	Churamani	4,058	34.15%	New
Independent	Hoshiar Singh Prasher	2,818	23.71%	New
Independent	Munshi Ram	1,655	13.93%	New
Independent	Rajinder Singh	1,295	10.90%	New
Independent	Jagat Ram	771	6.49%	New
Independent	Mehar Singh	689	5.80%	New
Independent	Mani Ram	297	2.50%	New
INC(O)	Tulsa Singh	251	2.11%	New
Margin of victory		1,240	10.44%	
Turnout		11,883	44.87%	
Registered electors		27,417		
INC win (new seat)				
