= Colt Terry =

- Born: February 8, 1929; Kissimmee, Florida, U.S.
- Died: September 15, 2005 (aged 76)
- Military career
- Allegiance: United States of America
- Branch: United States Army
- Service years: 1945–1970
- Rank: Lieutenant colonel
- Units: 10th Special Forces Group; 82nd Airborne Division
- Conflicts: Korean War; Vietnam War
- Awards: Bronze Star (2); Purple Heart

Curtis “Colt” Terry, (February 8, 1929 – September 15, 2005) was one of the original Green Berets – one of the original instructors of Army Special Forces. He died on September 15, 2005, from pancreatic cancer.

After forging his birth certificate to enlist at 16 in 1945, Terry served two tours in combat in Korea, one behind enemy lines, and three tours in combat in Vietnam. He enlisted in the U.S. Army on September 26, 1945, as a private. He retired in August 1970 as a Lieutenant colonel and during his time in service he spent more than 23 years as a Green Beret instructor. He earned a Purple Heart, and two Bronze Stars.
