= Raid on Philipsburg =

Raid On Philipsburg
- Part of War of 1812
Date	October 11–12, 1813
Location	Philipsburg, Quebec
Result	American victory

Belligerents
United Kingdom; Lower Canada	United States

Commanders and leaders
Lt. Col. Philip Luke	Colonel Isaac Clark

Strength
101 militia	400

Casualties and losses
1 killed 8 wounded 100 captured	2 wounded

During the War of 1812, on October 11, 1813, an American expeditionary force entered the Missisquoi Bay of Lake Champlain in Quebec, Canada, intent on raiding the area. Their goal was to stop smuggling goods across the border. They succeeded in defeating a contingent of Canadian militia and raid the town of Philipsburg, Quebec.

== Background ==
In the war there was a lot of smuggling across the border between Canada and America. Much of the smuggled goods were used to supply British regulars. Earlier in the war volunteers from Philipsburg burnt an Americans blockhouse in Stewartstown, New Hampshire. For both those reason Colonel Isaac Clark led a raid into the Missisquoi Bay.

== Raid ==
Clark's force sailed into the bay on one sloop, ten bateaux, and two scows carrying a total of 400 Americans. Their first stop was the house of Captain Cook of the Canadian militia. They plundered his house of all valuables. They then sailed to Philipsburg where a small group of Canadian militia opposed them. 150 of Clark's force landed and surrounded the Canadians. After a short firefight 1 Canadian was killed, 8 wounded, and 100 taken prisoner. Two stores in Philipsburg were looted but most houses remained untouched. At 5:00 pm the Americans departed for the nearby Rock River and stayed there the night. The next morning the Americans plundered two more houses. Many horses and cattle were sized and then the Americans returned to their side of the border.

== Aftermath ==
Colonel Isaac Clark conducted a few more successful raids around this area as the war continued.

=== Isaac Clark’s second raid around the area Missisquoi Bay ===
American Isaac Clark conducted his second successful raid on Missisquoi Bay on October 27, 1813. Issac Clark with an American force captured 90 head of cattle in his second incursion.

=== Isaac Clark’s occupation of Missisquoi and raid in Isle-aux Noix ===
When Missisquoi Bay was under temporary American occupation. Issac Clarke set his base of operations at Missisquoi Bay and set out on a raid on March 25, 1814. Colonel Clarke advanced with his detachment into the enemy’s country as far as the South River within 60-66 miles of Isle-aux Noix. Clarke’s raiding force captured the enemy’s picket or advanced guard, took 60 stands of arms, four oxen, and six horses. Then Colonel Issac Clarke withdrew safely back to his base of operations in Missisquoi Bay.

== Sources ==
- Cruikshank, Earnst (1902). The Documentary History of the campaign opun the Niagara. Welland Ontario: Lundys Lane Historical Society.
- Hannings, Bud (2012). The War of 1812: A Complete Chronology with biographies of 63 General Officers. McFarland and Company Inc.
- Darch, Heather (2019). "A Distant Drum: The War of 1812 In Missisquoi County". Townships Heritage Web Magazine.
