= National Liberation Army (Peru) =

1962–1965 insurgency in Peru

The National Liberation Army (abbreviated as ELN, Spanish: Ejército de Liberación Nacional) was a Peruvian guerrilla group. It sought to gather militants regardless of their political affiliation. A short-lived movement that was formed in 1962 and carried out numerous small skirmishes and actions culminating in a seven-month peak of militant actions in 1965, the ELN was largely scattered by the Peruvian Army by December 1965.

== Formation ==
When the theoretical basis for guerrilla warfare as expressed by Cuban leaders and summed up by Debray began to circulate in Peru, it only reinforced what many had maintained in practice: first comes action, then the party; the party is born out of the action.

— Hector Bejar, 1969

The group had a varied composition that grew to share a "certain disdain of 'politics' and suspicion of any type of party organisation", as well as a few discontent members from the Peruvian Communist Party. This new movement included some former members of the MIR youth branch.

Hector Bejar , one of the military commanders of the ELN, later summarised it as an attempt to create a "free association of revolutionaries" and "an army which would draw combatants together regardless of their ideologies or political affiliations". Following their collapse, Bejar remarked that one of their core mistakes had been not liaising and keeping communications open with larger revolutionary movements that could have supported them as they were attacked by the Peruvian Army; instead, they had opted to believe they could remain self-sufficient and rely on local recruits from the villages and plantations.

In 1962, the group considered itself under the leadership of Juan Pablo Chang Navarro.

=== Known membership ===
- Hector Bejar, lawyer and artist.
- Javier Heraud, poet with a large following after whom a brigade was subsequently named.
- Edgardo Tello, together with Heraud, hailed as "guerrilla poets".
- Hugo Ricra
- Moises Valiente, construction labourer
- Juan Chang, former leader in the Frente de Izquierda Revolucionaria
- Luis Zapata, leader of construction labourers in Cuzco
- Guillermo Mercado, former leader in the FIR and Leninist Central Committee
- Guillermo Lobaton, Philosopher, leader of an attack on a Ranger encampment.
- Nemisio Junco, a laborer who was among the first to join, and was killed at Sojos

== Militant activity ==
The ELN formed mobile training groups, desiring to have professional guerrillas sent into the rugged terrain rather than untrained volunteers. Approximately fifty group members were also believed to be entering southern Peru from Bolivia, after receiving training in Cuba. The group received assistance from the Bolivian Rodolfo Saldaña, who left later that year to fight in Argentina.

Thru a twist of fate, the government of Peru discovered and smashed a communist conspiracy hatched in Cuba that was designed to set this country aflame with guerrilla warfare, terroristic activities, and sabotage.

— Chicago Tribune, June 24, 1963

In January 1963, a group led by the 21-year-old poet Javier Heraud and Alain Elias crossed through Bolivia, where they picked up weapons and entered southern Peru. Plagued by Leishmaniasis infection, however, the 15-member team decided to enter the city of Puerto Maldonado on May 15 to seek out medical supplies.

According to one source, the local police were warned of the group's advance, and captured the six team members who had been sent to the city limits. According to other sources, the six militants had checked into the local hotel, and a police officer who heard about it went to the hotel to demand identifying documents from the youth. When they refused to show identification, other officers were called and escorted them towards the local prison; one of the guerrillas drew a gun and killed Sgt. Aquilino Sam Jara. The officers returned fire, wounding two of the militants as the others ran off hoping to escape capture. Either way, Elias, Abraham Lama and Pedro Morote were all captured within days of entering the town. Heraud was shot in the chest and killed while he drifted past the town in a dugout canoe. Hector Bejar was one of the few to escape, and it proved difficult for him to rebuild the militant group.

In 1965, when MIR announced they were beginning militant operations in response to the arrest of Hugo Blanco and the accession of the government of Fernando Belaunde Terry, the ELN was still not ready to begin operations, but felt pressured to become operational prematurely. It formed the Javier Heraud Brigade as their main column and moved into the densely forested foothills of San Miguel in April.

In June 1965, the ELN seized the Runateullo hacienda and destroyed the bridge on the Satipo highway that led to it, attacked a local mine, and assaulted the Andamarca police station. The group also launched an ambush at Yahuarina, where 17 ELN militants attacked a group of Civil Guards, killing nine, wounding nine and taking twelve prisoners (who were later released). Government officials later claimed there was evidence that the dead had been tortured.

That summer, Guillermo Lobaton led a group of ELN militants who attacked an Army Ranger encampment, capturing weapons and supplies; it was this action which first publicised the name of the Javier Heraud Brigade.

On September 25, 1965, the ELN led the seizure of the Chapi hacienda and execution of the two brothers who oversaw the plantation. The Carillo brothers, who owned the estate which extended over a large area of the La Mar Province, were alleged to have been cruel to their indentured and unpaid workers, frequently whipping and imprisoning them, and, in one January 1963 instance, to have strangled and beheaded a tenant farmer who objected to their seizure of his livestock. Following reports of the death of the brothers, the Civil Guard occupied the plantation to the jeers of the workers.

== Counterinsurgency by Peruvian Army ==
In October, following the overthrow of the Chapi hacienda, the Peruvian Army began a large counterattack aimed at wiping out the ELN. First sending a patrol disguised as militants asking local residents where they could find their comrades, the Army quickly rooted out sympathisers and collaborators. According to the ELN, the locals were tortured and executed.

As the group was encircled towards the end of 1965, membership dwindled until there were only 13 remaining guerrillas still hiding in the forests together.

On December 17, the army made substantial contact with the group near Tincoj and the ensuing firefight left three militants dead, including Edgardo Tello. Bejar and the remaining militants scattered into the forest and were unable to regroup as they fled the army's advance separately.

== Aftermath ==
Not every group member's fate is known. Juan Pablo Chang Navarro (known as El Chino), Jose Cabrera Flores (known as El Negro) and Lucio Galvan (known as Eustaquio) were all believed killed in 1967, fighting alongside Che Guevara in the Nancahuazu. Although one source suggests that Navarro survived, and actually tried to revive the militant movement in 1980 under the same name. Their remains are in the Che Guevara's memorial in Santa Clara, Cuba.

American ambassador Llewellyn E. Thompson used the 1963 skirmish as evidence that Fidel Castro was destabilising the hemisphere, in an oral statement to Soviet ambassador Anatoliy F. Dobrynin.

Bejar was arrested when he fled to Lima to seek medical treatment due to leishmaniasis; authorities said they surprised him convalescing in a Lima residence. He served five years in prison for sedition before being pardoned by General Juan Velasco Alvarado, who took power in 1968, and requested that Bejar work on reforming land policies with the government.

Bejar collaborated with Velasco's Government, being part of SINAMOS, a Government institution for social participation. In the seventies, Bejar and former members of SINAMOS formed CEDEP (Centre for Development and Participation) and was part of the edition committee of 'Socialismo y Participacion' (Socialism and participation), a social sciences journal. Bejar was 'Socialismo y Participacion' editor until its final issue in 2001. Bejar works today as lecturer at San Marcos University. and the Pontificia Universidad Catolica del Peru. In 2012, he published 'Mito y Utopia: Relato Alternativo del origen Republicano del Peru' (Myth and Utopia: Alternative story of the Republican Origin of Peru).ACHEBE Ediciones, 2012.

== See also ==
- Revolutionary Left Movement (Peru)
- Tupac Amaru Revolutionary Movement
- Shining Path
