= Adam Hyler =

- Born: 1735; Wurttemberg, Germany
- Died: September 6, 1782; New Brunswick, New Jersey
- Resting place: New Brunswick, New Jersey
- Occupations: Privateer and whaleboat captain
- Piratical career
- Allegiance: United States
- Base of operations: Sandy Hook and New York Harbor
- Commands: Revenge
- Battles: American War for Independence

Adam Hyler (1735–1782), born in Wurttemberg, Germany, was a privateer and whaleboat captain during the American War for Independence. He harassed the British ships in the New York Harbor area, burning several ships and capturing their crews. Hyler lived in New Brunswick, New Jersey.

Adam Hyler made several major raids on Sandy Hook and New York Harbor. On the evening of Friday, October 5, 1781, he led 6 whaleboats with his sloop Revenge and took British prisoners of war and provisions along with burning several ships.

The Monmouth County chapter of Hudson River Sloop Clearwater operated a Tuckerton Bay Sailing Garvey that is named after Adam Hyler. Now a museum piece at the Tuckerton Seaport Museum.

Sea Scout Ship 24, a unit of Sea Scouting (Boy Scouts of America), based in Staten Island, NY is named in honor of Adam Hyler. The New Jersey Friends of Clearwater Chapter of Hudson River Sloop Clearwater operated a Tuckerton Bay Sailing Garvey that is named after Adam Hyler.
