= Héctor Béjar =

Minister of Foreign Affairs of Peru

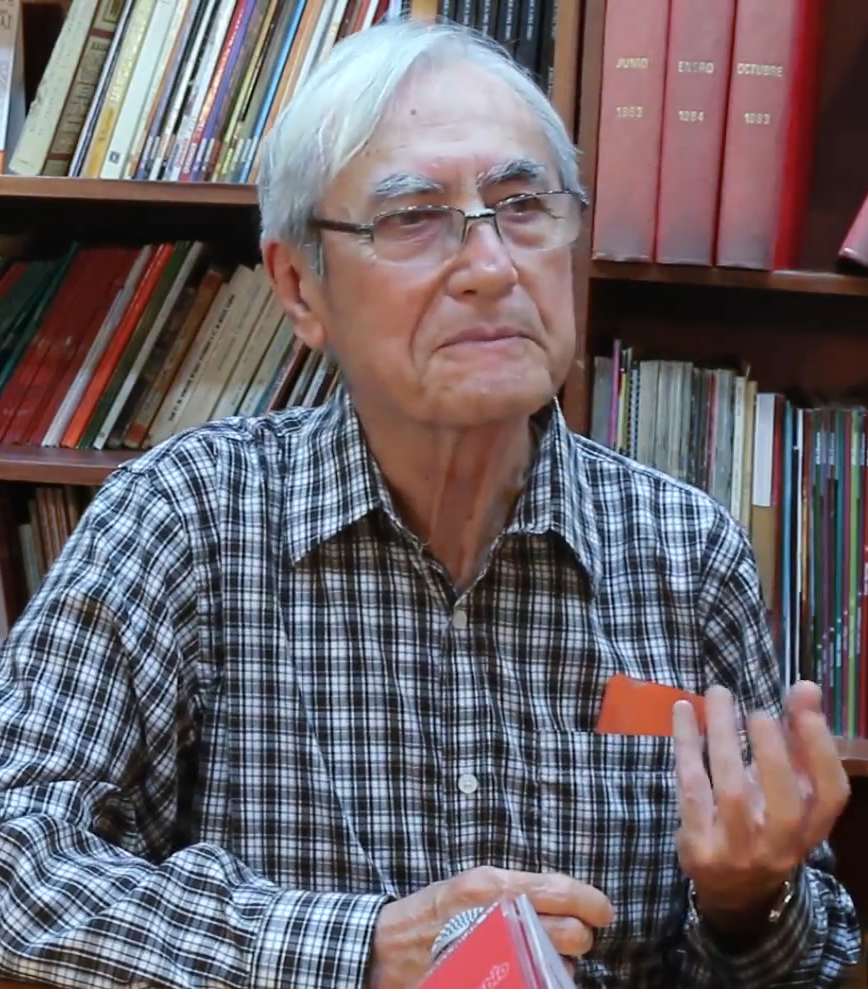

Minister of Foreign Relations
- In office 29 July 2021 – 17 August 2021
- President: Pedro Castillo
- Preceded by: Allan Wagner
- Succeeded by: Óscar Maúrtua

Personal details
- Born: Héctor Béjar Rivera; 2 September 1935 (age 90) Huarochirí, Peru
- Education: National University of San Marcos; Pontifical Catholic University of Peru
- Occupation: Author, professor, artist

Héctor Béjar Rivera (born 2 September 1935) is a Peruvian author, university professor. He served as the minister of foreign affairs of Peru from 29 July 2021 until 17 August 2021.

A historical figure in contemporary Peru, his participation in the National Liberation Army in the 1960s brought high media scrutiny, in addition to refusing to call Venezuela's current government under Nicolás Maduro a dictatorship.

== Publications ==
Héctor Béjar is the author of several essays, articles and books. His essay about the liberation movement in the sixties Peru 1965: Notes of a Guerrilla Experience, won the Latin American Casa de las Americas Prize in 1969 and was published in multiple languages.

In 1976, he published The Revolution Trapped, concerning the revolutionary political process in Peru between 1968 and 1975. Béjar was the editor of CEDEP's social sciences journal Socialismo y Participacion since its appearance in 1977 until its final issue in 2009.

The campesino organization about indigenous communities and rural development is published in 1980 and Millennium Goals and Millennium Myths in 2010.

His University text book Social Justice, Social Policy reached its 5th edition in 2013.

In 2012, he published Mito y Utopia: Relato Alternativo del origen Republicano del Peru ACHEBE Ediciones, 2012.

Béjar has been a professor at the Pontificia Universidad Catolica del Peru since 2014 and at the same time, Bejar was also a columnist in several international magazines. and newspapers. He resides in Peru and is an active lecturer.

In 2015 he published 'Retorno a la Guerrilla' ("Retorno a la Guerrilla") a literary and historical recount of the Peruvian terrorist movement and a tribute to the young people that took part of that movement and lost their lives.

In 2019, he published Vieja crónica y mal gobierno: Historia del Perú para descontentos ("Old Chronicle and Bad Government: History of Peru for the Disgruntled"), a critical recount of Peruvian history. Bejar has appeared in two Peruvian films in 2019: 'La Revolucion y la Tierra', about the Government of Juan Velasco Alvarado and 'El viaje de Javier', a documentary about the life of the Peruvian Poet Javier Heraud who died fighting in the guerrilla movement led by Bejar.

In October 2021 he published 'Velasco', a book about the Government of Juan Velasco Alvarado from 1968–1975.

== Political life ==
In 1962, together with Javier Heraud, Julio Dagnino, Alain Elias, Julio Chang among others, he founded the National Liberation Army which was part of the liberation movement of the sixties in Peru. He served five years in prison before being liberated by a general amnesty granted by General Juan Velasco Alvarado, who took power in 1968 and asked Béjar to work on reforming land policies with the government. Béjar collaborated with Velasco's Government on social and youth participation, supporting the national land reform. In the seventies, Béjar and former Velasco's collaborators formed CEDEP (Centre for Development and Participation) one of the first Peruvian Non-Governmental Organisations.

On 29 July 2021, President Pedro Castillo named Béjar the new minister of foreign affairs. He resigned on 17 August 2021 amid criticism for stating in a private webinar, one year before being Minister, that some elements of the Peruvian naval high command "had been responsible for terrorist acts" in the seventies against the administration of Juan Velasco, and furthermore had been trained by the CIA to do so as outlined in US diplomatic cables published by Wikileaks. Bejar later publicly clarified in the Peruvian media that he did not accuse the Navy as an institution and that his words were manipulated for political purposes.
