= Afghan Local Police =

Local militia

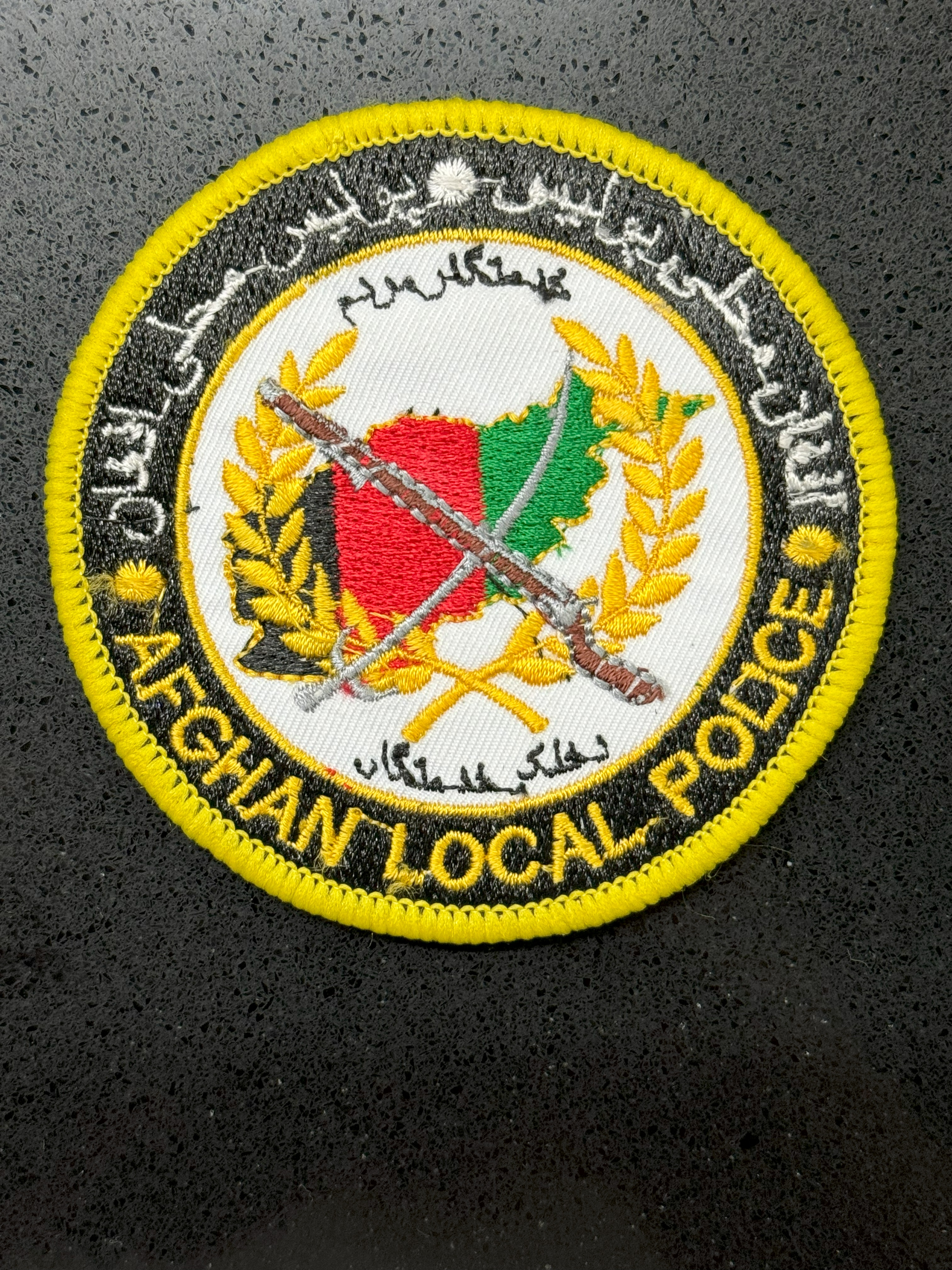
- Official ALP patch.
- Abbreviation: ALP

Agency overview
- Formed: 2010
- Dissolved: 2020
- Employees: 19,600 (February 2013)

Jurisdictional structure
- Operations jurisdiction: Afghanistan

The Afghan Local Police (ALP) was a US-UK sponsored local law enforcement agency, defence force and militia in Afghanistan as part of the Afghan Ministry of Interior Affairs. Formed primarily as a local defence force against Taliban insurgents, its members had no power of arrest and were only authorised to investigate crime if requested to do so by the Afghan National Police (ANP).

The ALP was established at the request of the International Security Assistance Force (ISAF) in Summer 2010 and is paid for by the United States. Officers underwent three weeks military and police training by ISAF personnel and receive weapons and a uniform. They are intended to defend their villages from insurgent attack and allow the ANP to focus on offensive operations. It was originally intended to function for between two and five years.

The US government provided funding in February 2013 to expand the ALP to 45,000 members and to provide the programme until at least 2018, anticipating the withdrawal of most foreign troops from the country by the end of 2014. The ALP has received a mixed press with its members being involved in several green on blue attacks, though it has borne a heavy cost in its fight against the Taliban – suffering casualty rates twice that of the ANP and Afghan Army.

International funding for the ALP ended on 30 September 2020, and it was disbanded later that year. As United States forces withdrew from Afghanistan in June 2021, the acting Minister of the Interior announced plans to arm 30,000 personnel as part of the ALP. However the interim government was overthrown by the Taliban by August that year.

== Formation ==
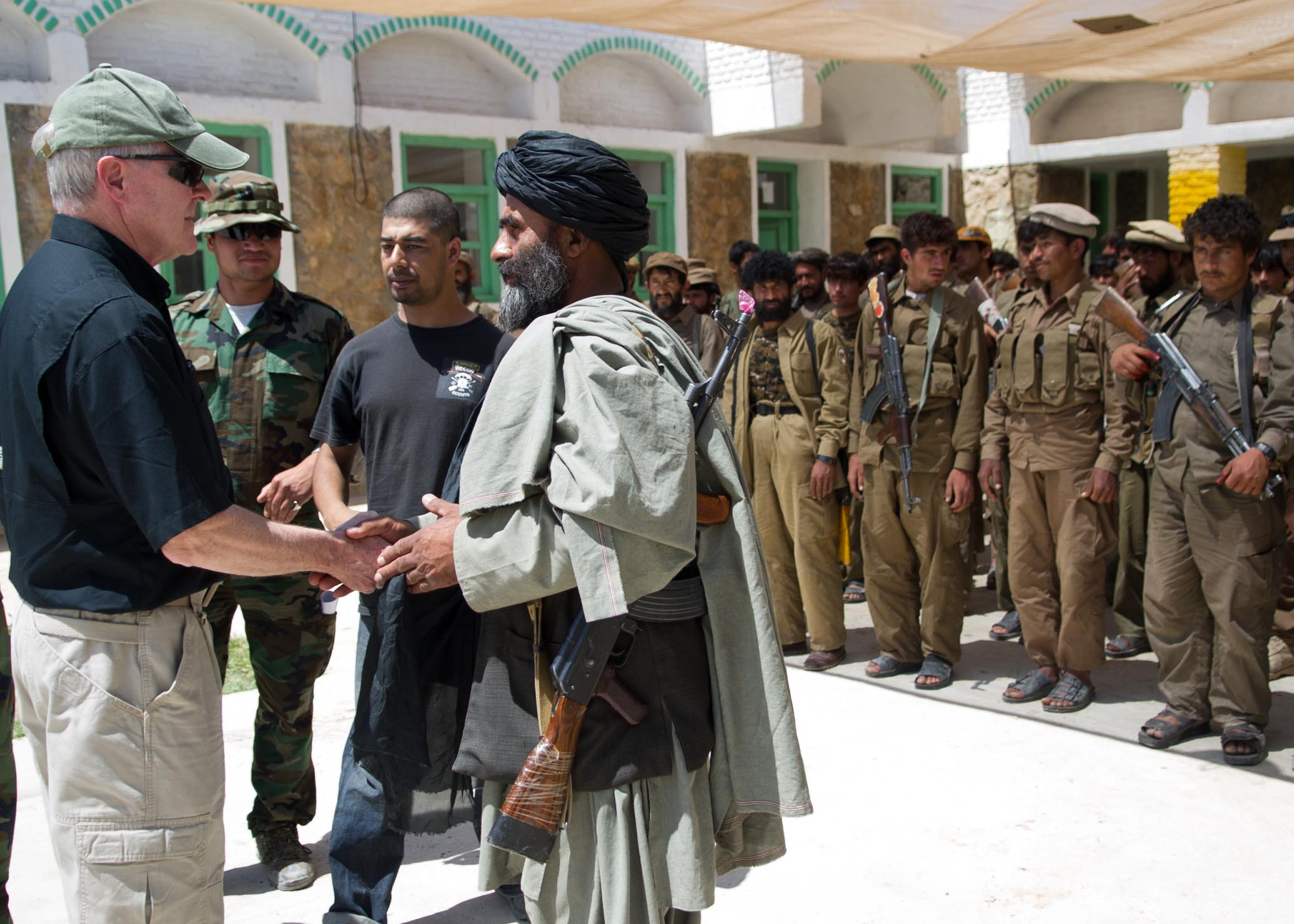
US Secretary of the Navy Ray Mabus meets ALP officers in April 2012

The Afghan government passed legislation to establish the Local Police in July 2010 and formal establishment occurred under a presidential decree of 16 August that year. An initial target of 10,000 members was set by the Afghan government and the US Congress agreed to provide funding for up to 30,000 policemen. It was originally planned to operate for between two and five years. By August 2011 7,000 men had been recruited.

Nomination and vetting was made by local village councils, with training provided by ISAF (primarily US) forces. ALP members report to the police district chief and come under the remit of the Ministry of Interior Affairs. The ALP was established with the backing of US General David Petraeus, but with strong opposition from Afghan President Hamid Karzai.

The US Combined Forces Special Operations Component Command- Afghanistan (CFSOCC-A) managed the American component of the programme.

== Operation ==
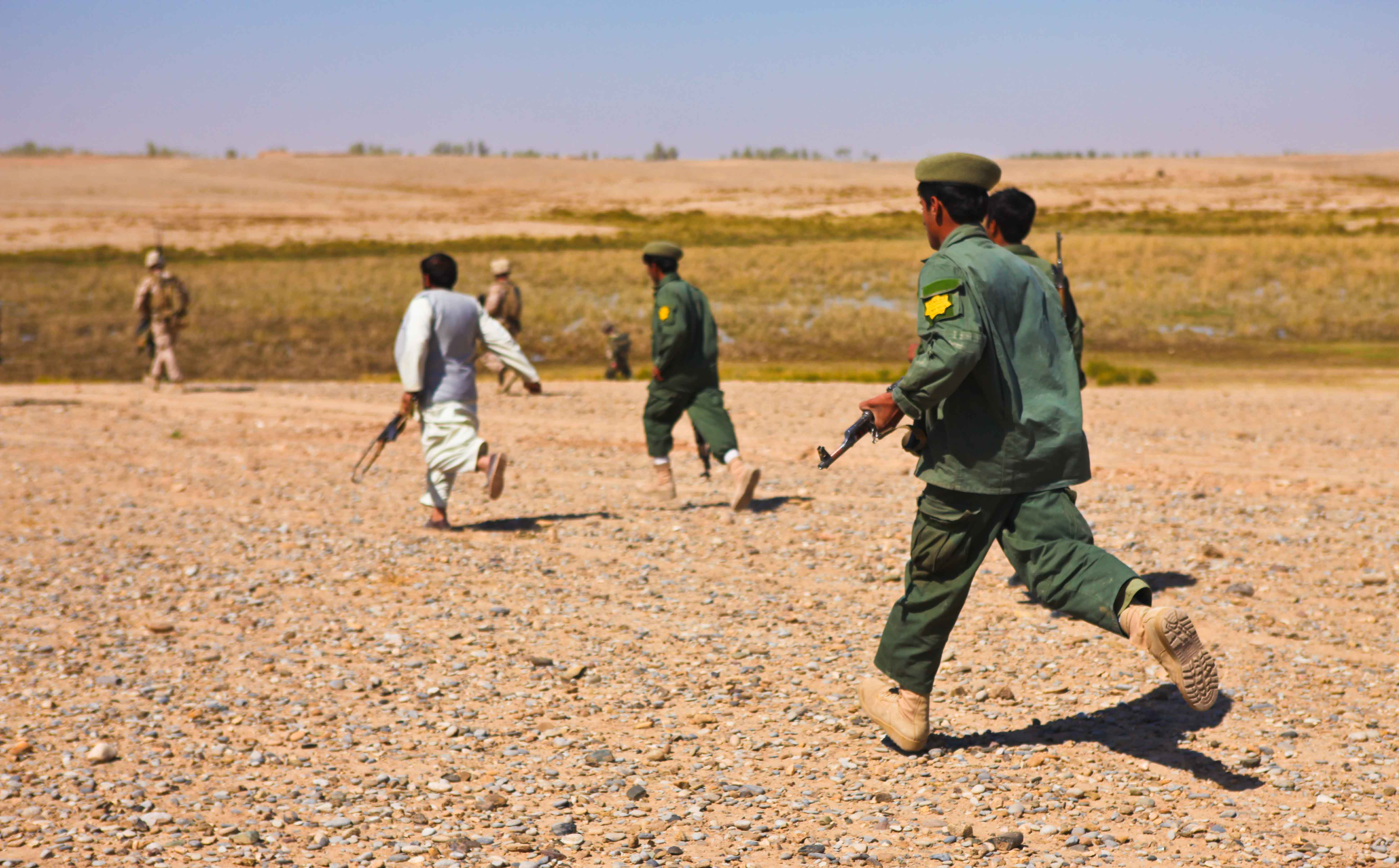
An ALP commander (in white) leads three ALP officers (in dark green) towards the sound of machine gun fire

The ALP was established as an armed defence force at village-level and did not have police powers. It was intended to free Afghan security forces from the defensive role and allow them to focus on offensive operations in advance of the withdrawal of foreign military units from Afghanistan. ALP candidates received three weeks of training some of which is delivered by US special forces personnel. The training primarily covered military skills such as marksmanship and IED detection but also covers human rights, the correct use of force and the Afghan constitution.

ALP officers did not have powers of arrest but could detain individuals for a limited amount of time before turning them over to the national police. The ALP was not intended to investigate crime (and could do so only if asked by the National Police) and was uniformed in khaki in contrast to the Afghan National Police's (ANP) blue uniforms. The ALP were not permitted to carry arms outside of their home districts ALP officers held a one-year employment contract, with a provision for officers to transfer to the ANP or the Afghan Army upon completion of their one-year service.

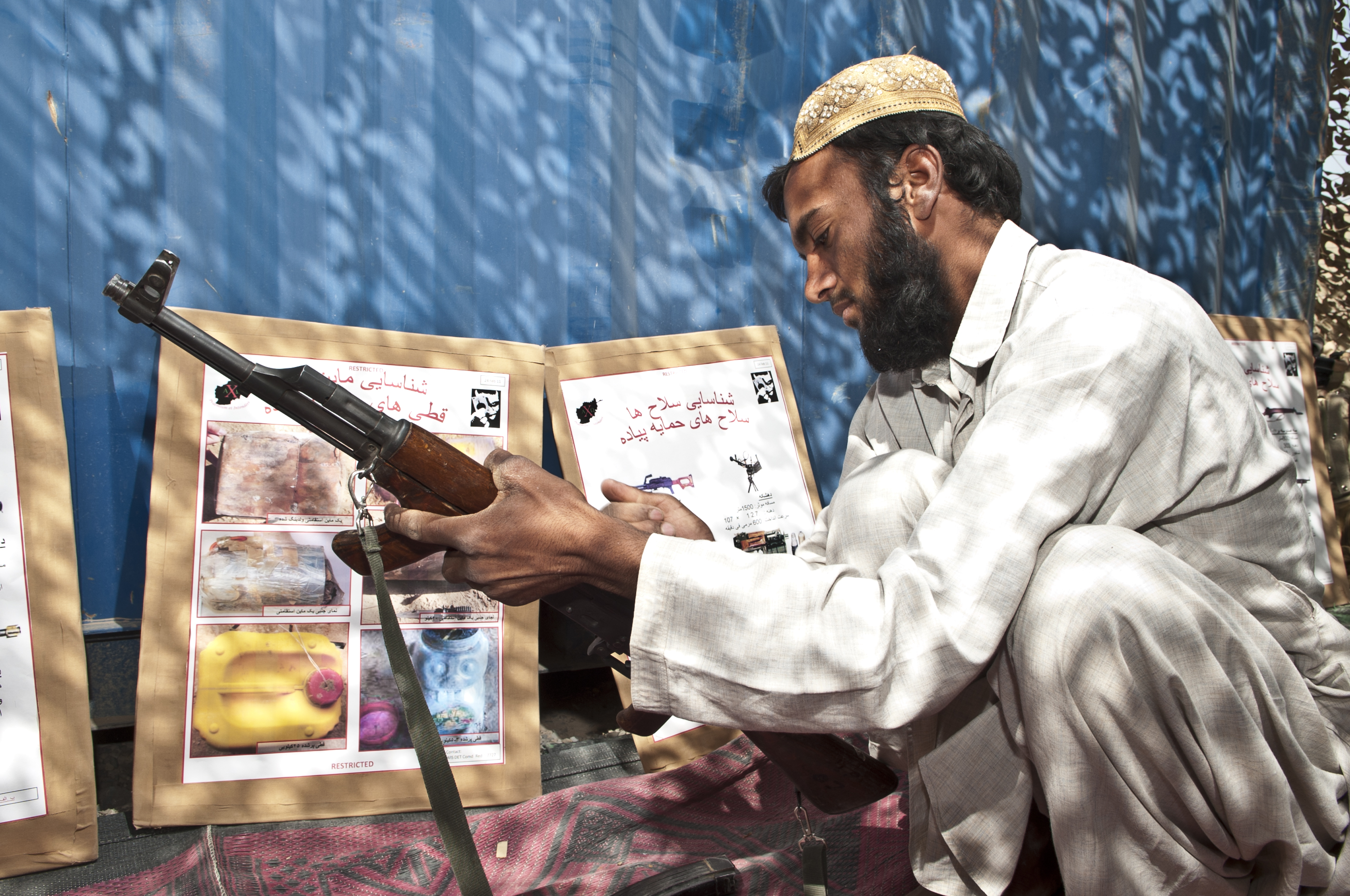
An Afghan receives familiarisation training with the PM md. 63 during an ALP training programme run by the British Royal Military Police

The ALP was intended to provide a local security presence whose members were known to those that they seek to protect. Previously this work fell to the Afghan National Police who were often sent from further afield and sometimes could not even speak the language of the local populace. A target of 30 ALP officers per village and 300 in each district was set by CFSOCC-A. Potential recruits were biometrically screened in conjunction with the Afghan National Directorate of Security for potential criminal or terrorist connections. Potential ALP officers were required to be Afghan nationals aged between 19 and 45, demonstrate patriotism and be fit and healthy. Monthly salaries are between 6,000 and 8,250 afghanis per month. The US government funded ALP salaries, weapons, ammunition and training through the Afghan Security Forces Fund that provided the finance direct to the Ministry of Interior. The goal was for ALPs to function independently of the US security forces with all ALP posts seeking to be independent by the end of 2014.

In February 2013 the US government announced plans to expand the ALP programme. The Pentagon would provide an additional $1.2 billion to extend the programme to at least 2018 and provide for 45,000 officers. US military commanders hoped that the programme would allow for the withdrawal of the majority of US troops by 2014 with only a small cadre of special forces personnel remaining to provide training to ALP officers and other Afghan security forces. As of February 2013 the ALP had a presence in just 100 of Afghanistan's 400 districts, though plans were in place to expand this to a further 44 districts within the next few months.

== Incidents ==
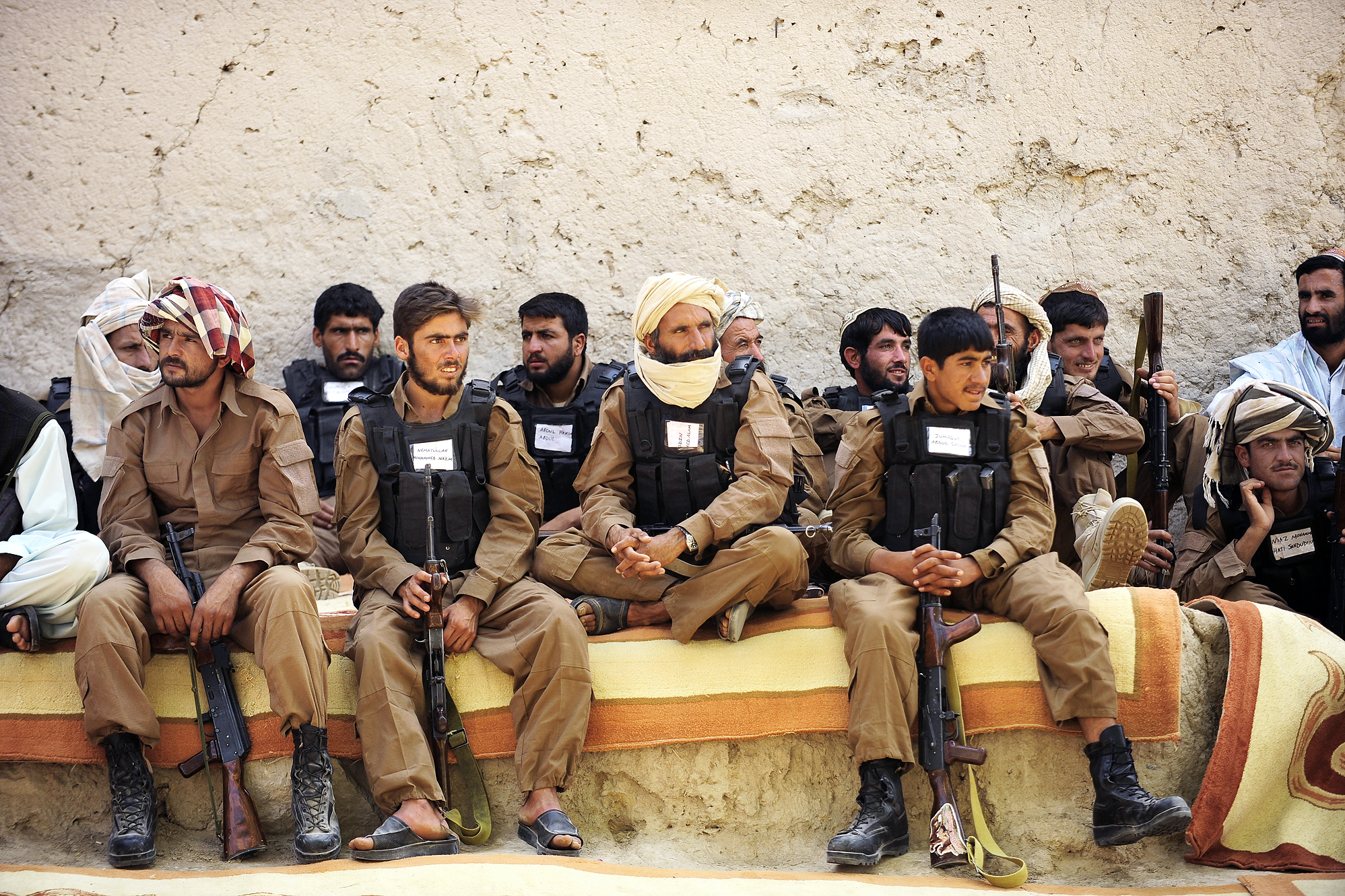
Afghan Local Police officers during a graduation ceremony in May 2012

Human Rights Watch raised concerns that the ALP simply provided arms and training to another militia and led to abuses of power by its members. At least 77 ALP officers had been investigated for criminal activity by February 2013, including serious allegations of murder and rape. Concerns were also raised over the power it placed in the hands of local village elders, the increased proliferation of weapons, the possible infiltration by Taliban, the financial cost and the reliance on western trainers. The use of the ALP was likened to a local militia, the use of which by the USSR in the 1980s left Afghans wary of similar forces.

The Local Police were involved in several green on blue attacks against ISAF security forces or their Afghan colleagues. On 30 March 2012 a local policeman poisoned and shot nine of his colleagues in an attack he carried out on behalf of the Taliban in Yayakhil, Paktika Province. A local policeman killed two US soldiers in Kinisk, Farah Province on 17 August 2012 after he was handed a weapon to begin training with. The policeman was shot dead by US and Afghan forces and a National Police officer was wounded. Following a spate of such attacks the US military halted training to the ALP in September 2012 to re-vet new candidates, existing members of the force were not affected by the decision. A local policeman who had infiltrated the organisation drugged and, with Taliban forces, shot 11 colleagues and six co-operating civilians at an ALP post in Ghazni Province, the worst such incident the force has suffered.

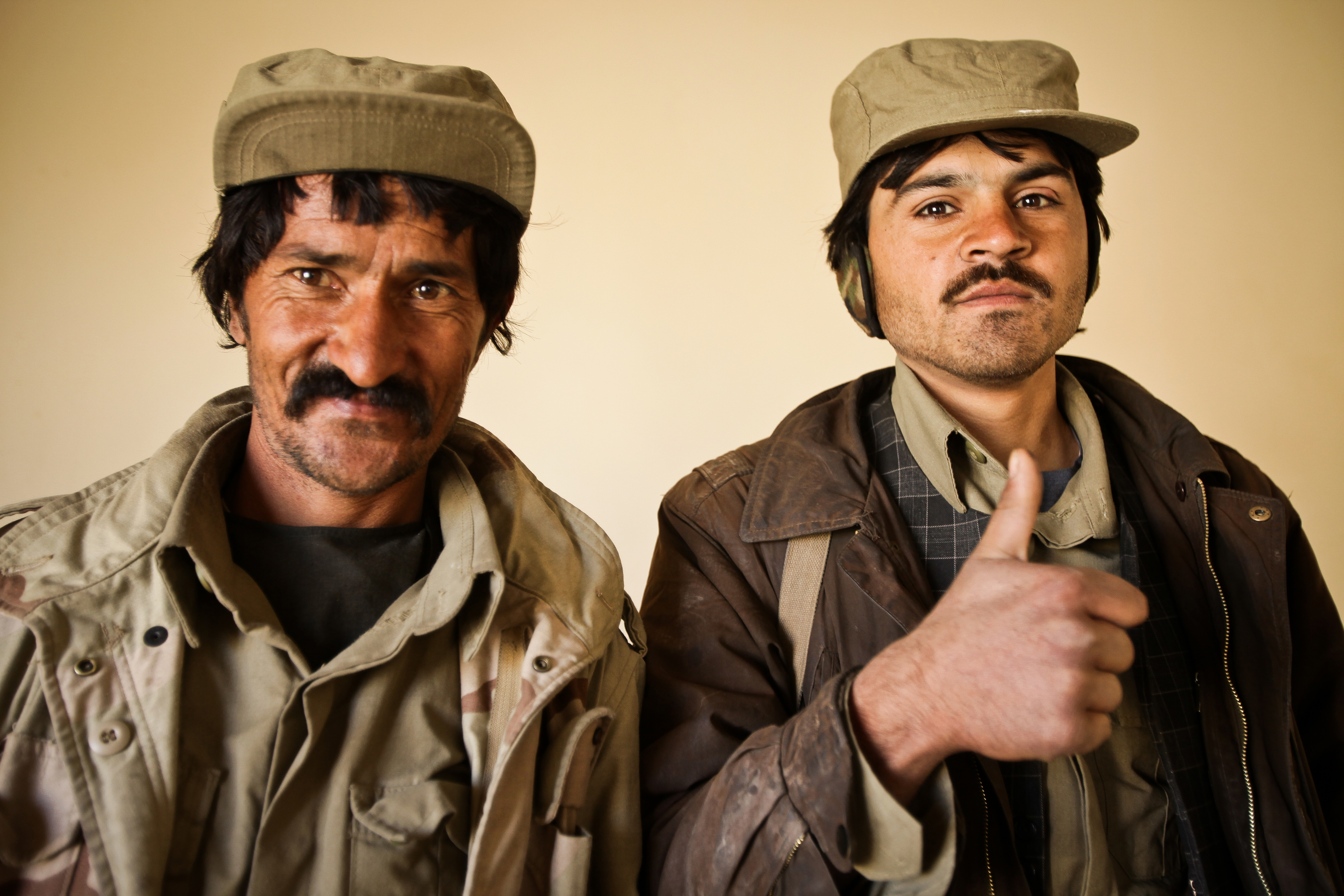
Two ALP officers

The Afghan Local Police were targeted by insurgents on numerous occasions. An attack on an ALP post in Khaki Safed, Farah Province in April 2012 left eight policeman dead and two captured and within the same timeframe a suicide bombing in the north of the country killed an ALP commander and his bodyguard and wounded 18 others. Another attack towards the end of the month killed 10 ALP officers when a roadside bomb hit the truck they were travelling in. Four policemen and five civilians were killed in a targeted suicide bombing on 18 June 2012 at Tagab in Kapisa Province, 17 civilians were wounded. Six ALP officers were killed in an explosion on 10 October 2012 in Nad Ali in Helmand Province. In all the casualty rate in the ALP runs at 6.2%, more than double that of the rest of the Afghan security forces.

The ALP was disbanded in 2020. One third of the force was retired, one third became part of the Afghan National Police, and one third became part of the Afghan National Army's Territorial Force.

== See also ==
- Village Stability Operations
- Jim Gant
- Sarandoy
- Arbaki
