= Juan Guartem =

Juan Guartem was a Spanish renegade pirate who raided Spanish settlements in New Spain during the late 17th century, most notably his raid against Chepo in 1679.

According to Spanish records, Juan Guartem traveled up the Mandinga River with buccaneers Eduardo Blomar and Bartolomé Charpes. Once across the Isthmus of Panama, they arrived at the coastal town of Chepo and then looted the town before burning it in 1679.

Although forces were sent by Spanish by the Viceroy of Panama, they failed to capture them as the buccaneers escaped into the jungle. Despite this, the three were tried in absentia by the Viceroy and were sentenced to death; Guartem and his two partners being hanged in effigy at Santa Fé de Bogotá the following year.

Despite this, Guartem and the others continued to raid settlements throughout the northern and southern coast of Panama.
