= Vincent R. Kramer =

United States Marine Corps officer (1918–2001)

- Born: May 31, 1918; Paterson, New Jersey, U.S.
- Died: September 17, 2001 (aged 83) Morristown, New Jersey, U.S.
- Buried: Arlington National Cemetery
- Allegiance: United States of America
- Branch: United States Marine Corps
- Service years: 1941–1964
- Rank: Colonel
- Conflicts: World War II; Guadalcanal campaign; China Burma India Theater; Korean War; French Indochina War; Vietnam War
- Awards: Navy Cross; Purple Heart

Vincent R. Kramer (May 31, 1918 – September 17, 2001) was a highly decorated United States Marine Corps colonel. He was a guerrilla warfare expert and was awarded the Navy Cross during the Korean War.

== Early life and World War II ==
Vincent R. Kramer was born on May 31, 1918, in Paterson, New Jersey. Upon graduating from Bordentown Military Institute, he attended Rutgers College under a football scholarship. While at Rutgers, he became a member of the Nu Beta chapter of Phi Gamma Delta and in later years served as the Chapter’s Purple Legionaire. In 1941, Kramer graduated with a bachelor's degree from Rutgers. Despite receiving letters of interest from several NFL teams, he went to Officer Candidates School and was commissioned as a second lieutenant in the Marine Corps.

During World War II, Kramer was wounded in the battle of Guadalcanal in late 1942. Kramer was later assigned to the U.S. Naval Group in China, where he trained Chinese guerillas under General Chiang Kai-shek until the end of the war. After the war, he volunteered for an assignment with the Central Intelligence Agency (CIA) in Taiwan.

== Korean War ==
When the Korean War started, the CIA was tasked with establishing an escape and evasion route through North Korea for downed UN aviators to use. Major Kramer was made the paramilitary operations chief and organized a plan for aviators to use for escape and evasion. Kramer's plan met the expectations of the Air Force and Navy and he was sent to Korea to implement it.

In Korea, Major Kramer recruited six men who had served with special operations and paramilitary groups during World War II. Kramer and his six new CIA agents then helped train North Korean guerillas at Naval Air Station Atsugi, Japan. Kramer and the North Koreans soon moved to Pusan to conduct additional training, and the force of guerillas grew to several hundred men.

As the training progressed in March 1951, Major Kramer began arranging for his guerillas to be inserted into North Korea. Kramer also had the guerillas practice amphibious landings. In late June, Kramer himself was inserted into North Korea and arrived at several rendezvous points. On July 7, he led 100 of his Korean guerillas in an intelligence gathering and sabotage mission. Kramer was awarded the Navy Cross for his actions. However, by February 1952, the escape and evasion corridor was regarded as a failure as the enemy had discovered many of the guerilla camps and killed the guerillas.

With his guerilla force out of commission, Major Kramer began to focus on cutting enemy railroads which were supplying naval mines to the harbors of Wonsan and Hungnam. These missions were carried out by UDT personnel who were inserted on the coastline and moved through enemy territory to plant explosives on bridges and tunnels.

== Later career and life ==
After his service in the Korean War, Kramer was a guerilla warfare advisor to the French Foreign Legion during the French Indochina War in 1952. Afterwards, he was assigned as a CIA officer in Berlin. In 1963, Kramer returned to Vietnam, where he was a staff member for General William Westmoreland until 1964. Upon completing this assignment, he retired with the rank of colonel.

Upon his military retirement, Kramer moved to the Basking Ridge section of Bernards Township, New Jersey, and became the Executive Secretary & Director of the Rutgers Alumni Association, a position he held until 1987. Vincent R. Kramer died on September 17, 2001, in Morristown, New Jersey. He was buried in Arlington National Cemetery.

== See also ==
- List of Navy Cross recipients for the Korean War
