= Paulina (Paiute leader) =

Chief Paulina
- Pahninee
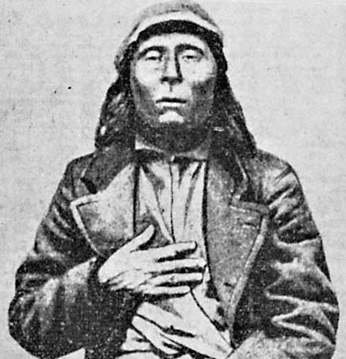
- Chief Paulina, circa 1865

Northern Paiute leader

Personal details
- Born: c. 1833 Location unknown
- Died: 25 April 1867 Jefferson County, Oregon
- Cause of death: Shot by Howard Maupin or James Clark
- Resting place: Unmarked location

Chief Paulina or Pahninee was a Northern Paiute war leader noted for his successful guerrilla tactics. He is known to have been active from 1859 until his death in 1867.

== Resistance against colonization ==
During the late 1850s and 1860s, Paulina led the Hunipuitoka band, a band of Northern Paiutes that violently resisted encroachment on their lands. The band refused to relocate to a Native American reservation and attacked settler communities traveling through or living on Paiute lands in central and eastern Oregon and the Klamath Basin.

Paulina became the most notorious war leader in those raids. He was known for the swiftness of his attacks and his ability to evade capture by both volunteer regiments and U.S. Army detachments under General George Crook. He led a small band (including his brother Wahveveh) that raided and stole livestock and horses, causing fear within nearby communities. The band also attacked Indians living on the Warm Springs Indian Reservation. There has been some speculation that Paulina's hatred for the Warm Springs Indians and white settlers occurred in April 1859 when Dr. Thomas Fitch led Native Americans from the Warm Springs Indian Reservation to attack a band of Paiutes in the valley of the John Day River. The party killed 10 Paiute warriors, capturing the women and children and the rest of the band. Among those captured were Paulina and Wahveveh, both of whom were later sent to Fort Dalles only to be imprisoned for a short time.

Captain John M. Drake led one of the first military campaigns into the area. Paulina defeated an army attack on his camp near Juniper Butte, and the conflicts increased. The Paiute threat was broken up into two bands led by Paulina, of the Walpapi band, and Weahwewa, of the Kidutokado band. In one particular incident, Paulina arranged peace talks with the Chief of the Wascos, Queapama. However, under that guise, Paulina had one of his braves murder Queapama. While predatory bands such as Paulina's certainly profited from these attacks, they ultimately contributed to the climate of hostility that increased the level of violence and the death toll in the region. All the resident groups—settlers, native communities at Warm Springs and Umatilla, and the Northern Paiute—engaged in retaliatory actions that resulted in the deaths of dozens of people, including women and children.

After U.S. Army forces captured Paiute hostages and held them prisoner at Ft. Klamath, including Paulina's sister, wife and son, Paulina and the other leaders of the Hunipuitöka Paiute agreed to sign a treaty in early 1865. To avoid starvation, Paulina and his group left the Klamath Reservation on April 22, 1866, in spite of the treaty agreement they considered unfair. When they left, Howluck contacted him looking for aid to exact revenge for the killing of his followers by California troops in the Guano Valley.

== Burnt Ranch ==
On September 15, 1866, Paulina and his band of fourteen Paiutes attacked the ranch of James N. Clark near the junction of Bridge Creek and the John Day River. The raiders burned the house, stables, 40 short tons (36,000 kg) of hay, 1,000 imperial bushels (36 kl) of oats and barley, and stole two horses and a cow, causing an estimated $6,494 of damage. Clark's wife was visiting her parents in the Willamette Valley at the time, but an unarmed Clark and his 18-year-old brother-in-law were collecting driftwood on the John Day when they saw the Paiutes. Paulina and his band spotted them and gave chase, but Clark managed to escape, and his brother-in-law hid in the river with only his nose out of the water for several hours undetected, although nearing hypothermia.

Clark was able to gather a posse to try to salvage some of his stolen property. One year after Paulina left the Klamath Reservation on April 25, 1867, Clark shot and scalped Paulina in a retaliatory attack led by settlers and Howard Maupin. Paulina's last engagement took place at a cove later named Paulina Basin, located in northeastern Jefferson County near the town of Ashwood, Oregon. Maupin took credit for killing Paulina and nailed Paulina's scalp to the wall of his barn as a trophy.
