= Mangwal, Afghanistan =

Mangwal
- Village
- Location in Afghanistan
- Coordinates: 34°36′7″N 70°49′41″E
- Country: Afghanistan
- Elevation: 2,434 ft (742 m)

Mangwal (Pashto: منګول) is a village in Khas Kunar District, Kunar Province, Afghanistan. It is located at 34°36'7N 70°49'41E with an altitude of 742 metres (2437 feet).
