= List of active separatist movements in Africa =

This is a list of currently active separatist movements in Africa. Separatism includes autonomism and secessionism.

== Criteria ==
What is and is not considered an autonomist or secessionist movement is sometimes contentious. Entries on this list must meet three criteria:

1. They are active movements with active members.
2. They are seeking greater autonomy or self-determination for a geographic region (as opposed to personal autonomy).
3. They are citizens/people of the conflict area and do not come from another country.

Under each region listed is one or more of the following:

- De facto state (de facto entity): for unrecognized regions with de facto autonomy.
- Proposed state: proposed name for a seceding sovereign state.
- Proposed autonomous area: for movements towards greater autonomy for an area but not outright secession.
  - De facto autonomous government: for governments with de facto autonomous control over a region.
  - Government-in-exile: for a government based outside of the region in question, with or without control.
  - Political party (or parties): for political parties involved in a political system to push for autonomy or secession.
  - Militant organisation(s): for armed organisations.
  - Advocacy group(s): for non-belligerent, non-politically participatory entities.
  - Ethnic/ethno-religious/racial/regional/religious group(s).

== Algeria ==
Location of Kabylie

Kabylia

- Ethnic group: Kabyle Berbers
  - Proposed state: Kabylia.
  - Government-in-exile: Kabyle Provisional Government (ANAVAD AQVAYLI UΣḌIL).
  - Movement leader: Ferhat Mehenni.
  - Political party: Movement for the self-determination of Kabylie (MAK).

Kabylia is a charter member of the Unrepresented Nations and Peoples Organization (UNPO)

Kabylia is a charter member of the Organization of Emerging African States

== Angola ==
Cabinda

Central-Eastern Angola

- Ethnic group: Lunda-Tchokwé people
  - Proposed state or autonomous region: Democratic Republic of Lunda-Tchokwé
  - Government-in-exile: Partido Democrático da Defesa do Estado Lunda-Tchokwé,
  - Political party: Partido Democrático da Defesa do Estado Lunda-Tchokwé
  - Advocacy groups: Mulher Unida da Lunda-Tchokwé, Pioneiros Unidos da Lunda-Tchokwé, Juventude Unida da Lunda-Tchokwé, Manifesto Jurídico Sociológico do Povo Lunda-Tchokwé

Cabinda

- Ethnic group: Bakongo
  - Proposed state: Republic of Cabinda
  - Government-in-exile: Frente para a Libertação do Enclave de Cabinda (FLEC) (member of the Unrepresented Nations and Peoples Organization)
  - Political party: Frente para a Libertação do Enclave de Cabinda (FLEC), Liberation Front of the State of Cabinda
  - Militant organization: Forças Armadas de Cabinda (FAC)
  - Status: Ongoing low-intensity war

Cabinda is a charter member of the Organization of Emerging African States

Zaire Province and Uíge Province

- Ethnic group: Kongo people
  - Proposed: restoration of the Kongo Kingdom within Angola
  - Movement: Movement of Sovereigns and Scholars

== Botswana ==
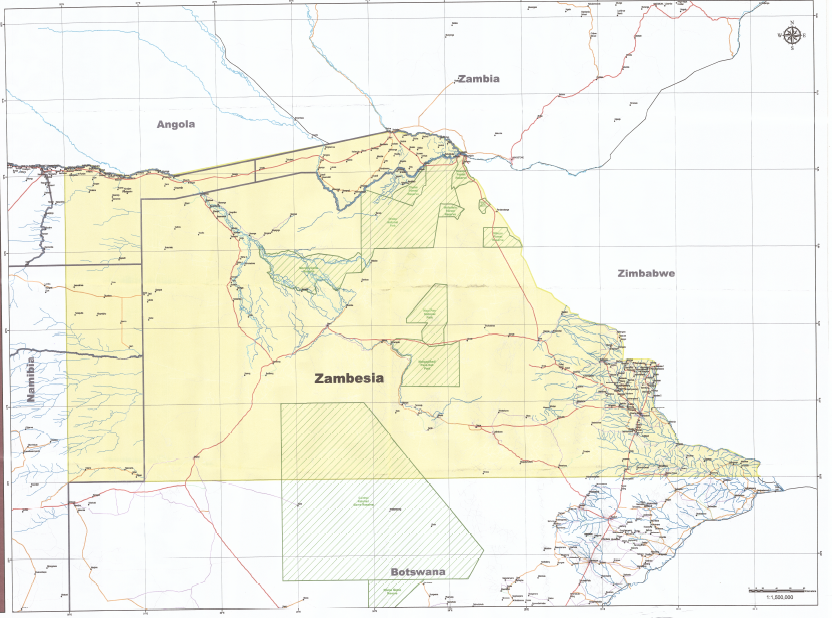
Map of Zambesia

Ngamiland

- Ethnic group: Masubia, Nzanza, Mbowe, Makalahari, MaYeyi, Mampukushu, Makwengari, Mambunda, Matotela, Batoka, Mafwe, Barotse, Leya, Nanzwa, Lujana, Dombe
  - Advocacy group: Movement for the Survival of the River Races of Zambesia
  - Proposed state: Zambesia

North-West District

- Ethnic group: San people
  - Proposed: autonomy for the San people

Kgatleng District

- Ethnic group: Bakgatla people
  - Proposed: full restoration of the Bakgatla Reserve as an autonomous region or independence

North-East District

- Ethnic group: Kalanga people
  - Proposed: establishment of a reserve in the North-East District for the Kalanga people

== Cameroon ==
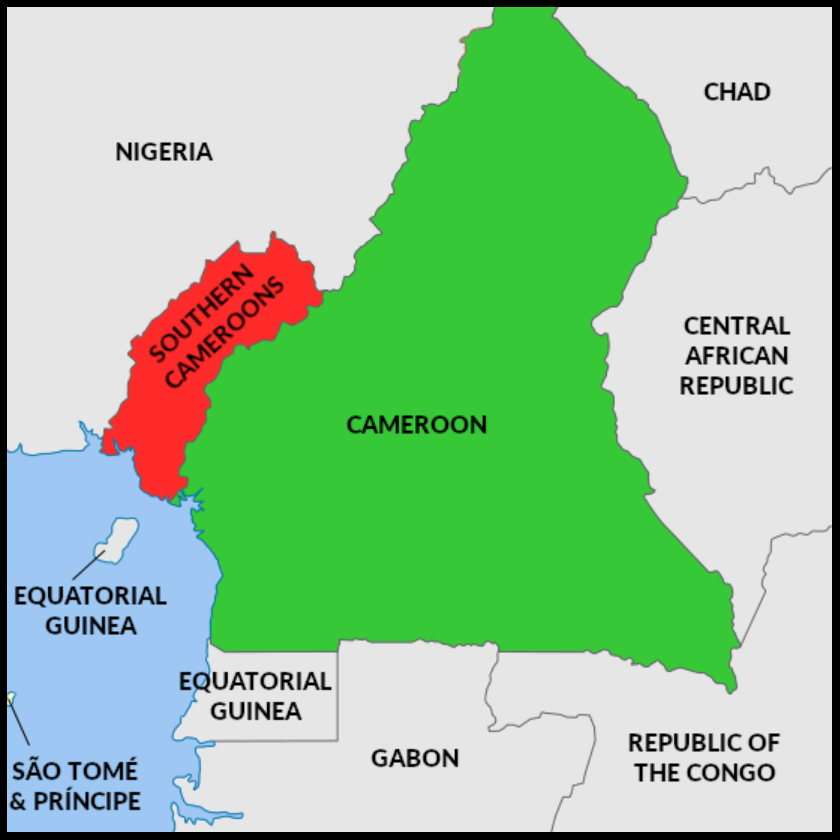
Proclaimed Ambazonian territory

Ambazonia

- Ethnic group: Anglophones of the former Southern Cameroons, consisting of over 80 ethnic groups
  - Population: ~4 million people
  - Proposed state: Federal Republic of Ambazonia
  - Advocacy group: Interim Government of Ambazonia, Ambazonia Governing Council and others
  - Militant groups: Ambazonia Self-Defence Council, Ambazonia Defence Forces, SOCADEF, other smaller militias
  - Status: Ongoing civil war

Ambazonia is a charter member of the Organization of Emerging African States

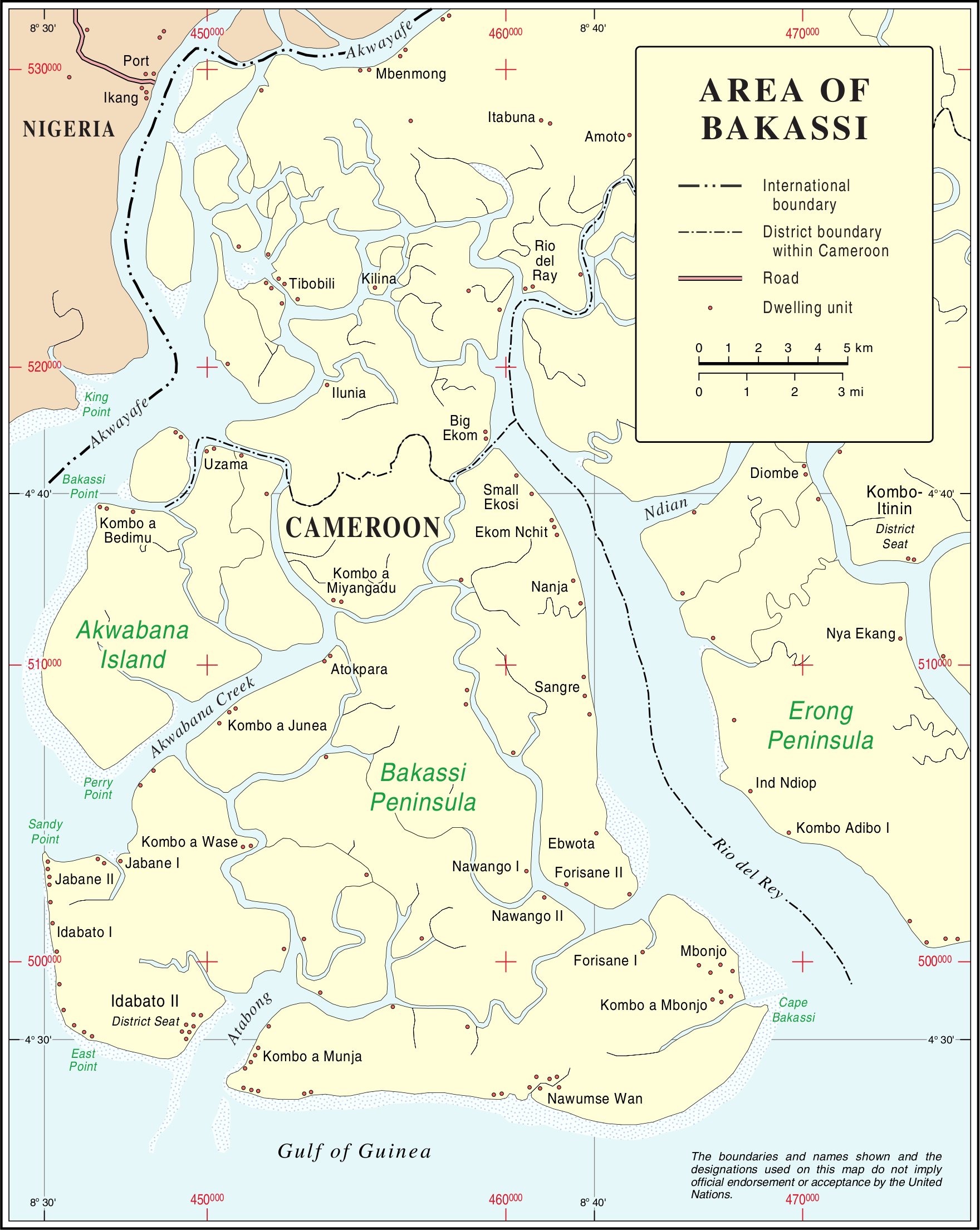
Bakassi

Bakassi

- People: Oron
  - Population: 150,000–300,000 people (subject of dispute)
  - Proposed state: Democratic Republic of Bakassi
  - Militant organization: Bakassi Movement for Self-Determination

Kanuri people

- Ethnic group: Kanuri people
  - Proposed state: Kanowra (also includes parts of Chad, Nigeria and Niger)

== Cape Verde ==
São Vicente

- Proposed: autonomy for São Vicente
  - Political party: Democratic and Independent Cape Verdean Union

== Central African Republic ==
Territories under control of FPRC around 2024

Areas claimed by Dar al-Kuti

Dar El Kuti (Republic of Logone)

- Ethnic group: Muslims in the Central African Republic
  - Proposed state: Dar al-Kuti
  - Advocacy group and militant organization: Séléka
  - Status: Ongoing civil war, effectively a proto-state

Dar El Kuti is a self-proclaimed state supported by the Popular Front for the Rebirth of Central African Republic (FPRC), a Muslim rebel movement in the Central African Republic.

Azande in the central African Republic

- Ethnic group: Azande people
  - Proposed: self determination for the Azande people

== Chad ==
Tibesti, Borkou and Ennedi Ouest

- Ethnic group: Toubou people
  - Proposed: autonomy for the Toubou in Chad
  - Militant organization: Movement for Democracy and Justice in Chad

== Republic of Congo ==
Southern Departments(Kouilou, Niari, Bouenza, Lekoumou and Pool)

- Ethnic group: Kongo people
  - Proposed state: South Congo

== Democratic Republic of the Congo ==
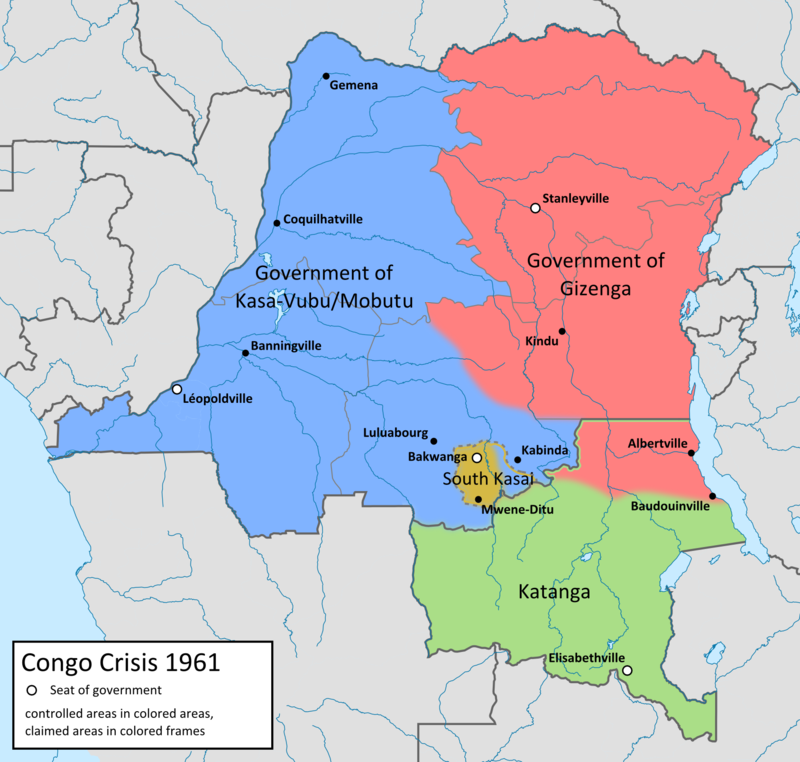
Katanga in green

Katanga

- Political parties: Union of Independent Federalists and Republicans
- Militant organizations: Mai Mai Kata Katanga
- Katanga is a charter member of the Organization of Emerging African States
- Status: Ongoing insurgency

Kivu

- Ethnic group: Bashi people
  - Proposed state: Republic of Kivu
  - Militant organization: Congo River Alliance

Great Lakes Twa

- Ethnic group: Great Lakes Twa
  - Proposed: autonomy of the Great Lakes Twa

Kasaï region

- Ethnic group: Luba people
  - Proposed: independence for the Kasaï region

Équateur

- Ethnic group: Mongo people
  - Proposed: independence for Équateur

== Djibouti ==
Obock Region and Tadjourah Region

- Ethnic group: Afar people
  - Proposed: autonomy for Afar people in Djibouti
  - Political party: Front for the Restoration of Unity and Democracy

== Equatorial Guinea ==
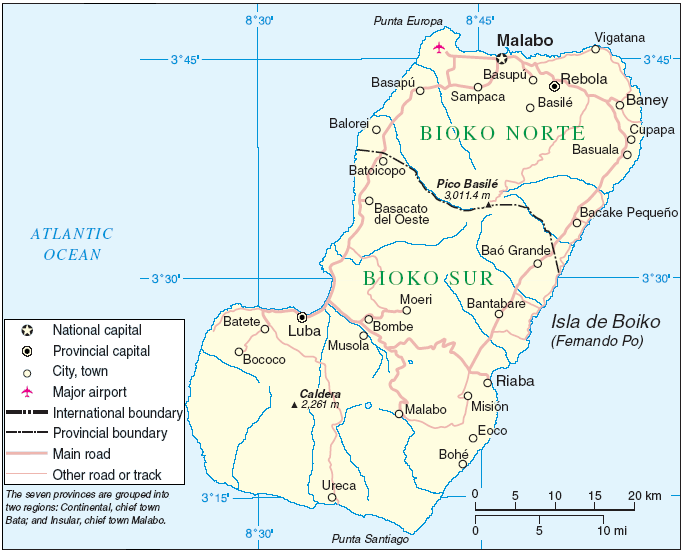
Bioko

Bioko

- Ethnic group: Bubi
  - Proposed state: Bioko Island
  - Advocacy group: Movement for the Self-Determination of Bioko Island

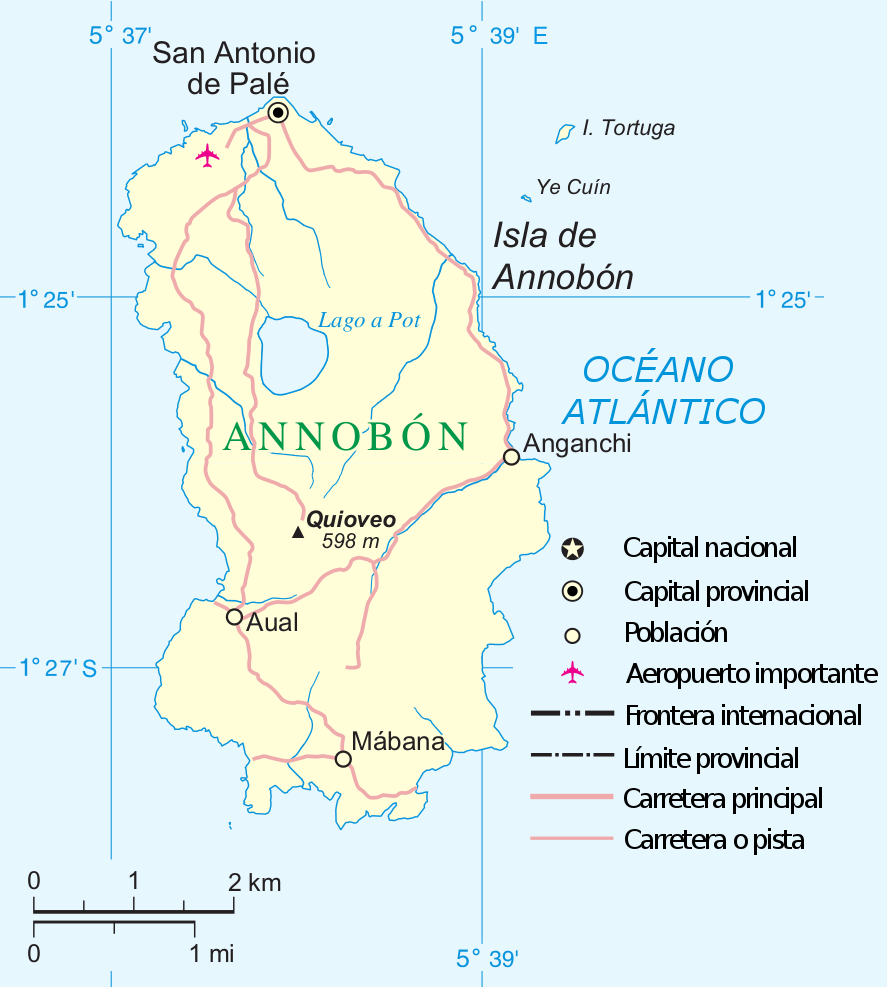
Annobón

Annobón

- Ethnic group: Portuguese Africans
  - Proposed state: Republic of Annobón
  - Advocacy group: Free Annobón

== Eritrea ==
Eritrean highlands and the Tigray Region

- Ethnic group: Tigrinya people
  - Proposed independent state: Agazian state
  - Advocacy groups: Agazian Movement, Tigray People's Liberation Front (alleged)

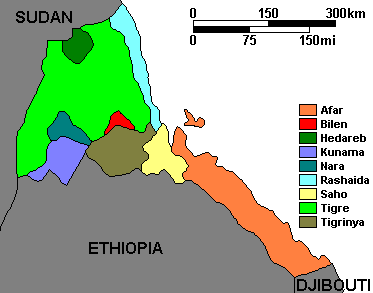
Map of Dankalia, Saho, and Kunama

Southern Red Sea Region

- Ethnic group: Afar people, Saho people
  - Proposed autonomous area: Dankalia or unification with Ethiopia
  - Advocacy groups: Red Sea Afar Democratic Organisation, Democratic Movement for the Liberation of the Eritrean Kunama, Saho People's Democratic Movement

== Ethiopia ==
Map of the regions and zones of Ethiopia

Amhara

Amhara

- ethnic group: Amhara people
  - proposed: self determination and/or autonomy for Amhara
  - political party: National Movement of Amhara
  - status: Ongoing

Afar Region

Afar

- ethnic group: Afar people
  - proposed: independence for the Afar Region
  - political party: Afar Revolutionary Democratic Unity Front

Somali Galbeed

Ogaden ( Somali Region)

- Proposed state: Ogadenia (member of the Unrepresented Nations and Peoples Organization) or unification with Somalia
  - Political party: Ogaden National Liberation Front

Oromia

Oromia

- Proposed state or autonomous area: Oromia (member of the Unrepresented Nations and Peoples Organization)
  - Political party: Oromo Liberation Front, Oromo Federalist Congress
  - Militant organizations: Oromo Liberation Army

Tigray region

Tigray

- Proposed state or autonomous area: Tigray
  - Political party: Tigray Independence Party Tigray People's Liberation Front, Arena Tigray For Democracy and Sovereignty, National Congress of Great Tigray, Salsay Weyane Tigray (Regionalist)
  - Militant organizations: Tigray Defense Forces

== France ==
Map of Réunion

Map of Mayotte

Réunion

- Political party: Lorganizasion Popilèr po Libèr nout Péi (Lplp) – Popular Front for National Liberation: composed of Nasion Rénioné, Mar, Drapo rouz, Patriot rénioné and Mir.
- Political party: Communist Party of Réunion
- Proposed state: Republic of Réunion

Mayotte continues to have autonomist and separatist movements despite the island having voted to become France's 101st department in 2011.

== Gabon ==
Ogooué-Lolo Province and Haut-Ogooué

- Ethnic group: Mbama people
  - Proposed autonomous region: Haut-Ogooue-Lolo

== Ghana ==
Map of the Togoland

Western Togoland

- Proposed state: Western Togoland
  - Militant organizations: Western Togoland Restoration Front (member of UNPO)

Greater Accra Region

- Ethnic group: Ga-Adangbe
  - Proposed: greater autonomy for Greater Accra Region

Savannah Region

- Ethnic group: Dega people
  - Proposed: autonomy for the Dega people in the Savannah Region

== Kenya ==
Mombasa

Mombasa

- Proposed state: Coast Province, Mombasa Republic
- Political party: Mombasa Republican Council
- Status: Active
- Mombasa Republic is a charter member of the Organization of Emerging African States

Rift Valley, Western Province, Nyanza

- Proposed State or autonomous region: People's Republic of Kenya
  - Political Party: Azimio la Umoja

North Eastern Province

- Ethnic group: Somali people
  - Proposed: independence or unification with Somalia

== Ivory Coast ==
Southwestern and southern-central regions of the Ivory Coast

- Ethnic group: Bété people
  - Proposed state: Ebournie

== Liberia ==
Grand Cape Mount County

- Ethnic group: Muslims in Liberia
  - Proposed: independence for the Muslims in Liberia

== Libya ==
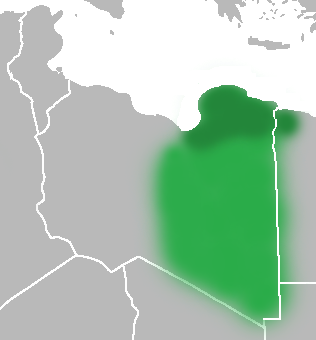
Cyrenaica in Libya

Cyrenaica

- Ethnic group: Arabs
  - Proposed autonomous region or state: Cyrenaica
  - Political party: Cyrenaica Transitional Council

Fezzan

- Ethnic group: Toubou people, Arabs, Tuaregs and Berbers
  - Proposed: greater autonomy for Fezzan

Amazighs in Libya

- Ethnic group: Amazighs
  - Proposed: autonomy for the Amazighs in Libya
  - Advocacy group: Amazigh Supreme Council

== Malawi ==
Nyika

- Proposed state: Northern Nyika Republic
- Political party: The Peoples Party

Mzimba District

- Ethnic group: Ngoni people
  - Proposed autonomous area: Ngoni Kingdom

Southern Region

- Ethnic group: Lomwe people
  - Proposed state: United States of Thyolo and Mulanje
  - Political party: People's Land Organisation

== Mali ==
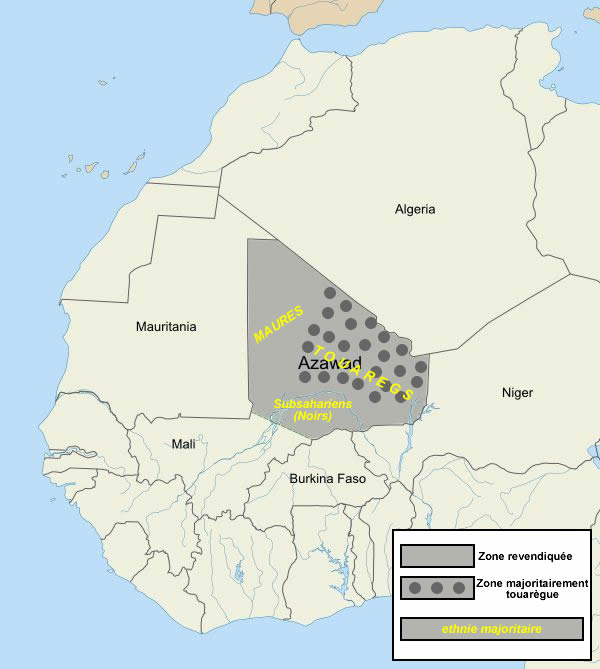
Map of Azawad, as claimed by the MNLA. Dark grey dots indicate regions with a Tuareg majority.

Azawad

- Ethnic group: Tuareg
  - Proposed state or autonomous area: Azawad
  - Political party: Coordination of Azawad Movements, which includes MNLA
  - Militant organisations: National Movement for the Liberation of Azawad
  - Azawad is a charter member of the Organization of Emerging African States

Massina

- Ethnic group: Fula
  - Proposed state: Massina Empire
  - Militant organizations: Katiba Macina

Kayes Region

- Ethnic group: Khassonké people
  - Proposed state: Kayes

== Mauritania ==
Northern Mauritania (unspecified)

- Proposed: independence for Northern Mauritania

Eastern Mauritania (Hodh Ech Chargui, Hodh El Gharbi, Tagant and Assaba)

- Proposed: unification with Mali ("اتْمولي"), secession (supposed as of March 11, 2008) or autonomy (as of August 29, 2014 - Samba Thiam)

South(eastern?) Mauritania (unspecified, could be the same as Eastern Mauritania)

- Ethnic group: Haratin(e)
  - Proposed: independence for a state for Black Mauritanians in the south (as of August 29, 2014 - Samba Thiam)

== Mauritius ==
Location of Rodrigues in the Indian Ocean

Rodrigues

- Ethnic group: Rodriguan
  - Proposed greater autonomous area or state: Rodrigues
  - Political party: Rodrigues People's Organisation

Agaléga

- Ethnic group: Agaléga islanders
  - Proposed autonomous region: Agaléga
  - Advocacy group: Les Amis d’Agaléga

== Morocco ==
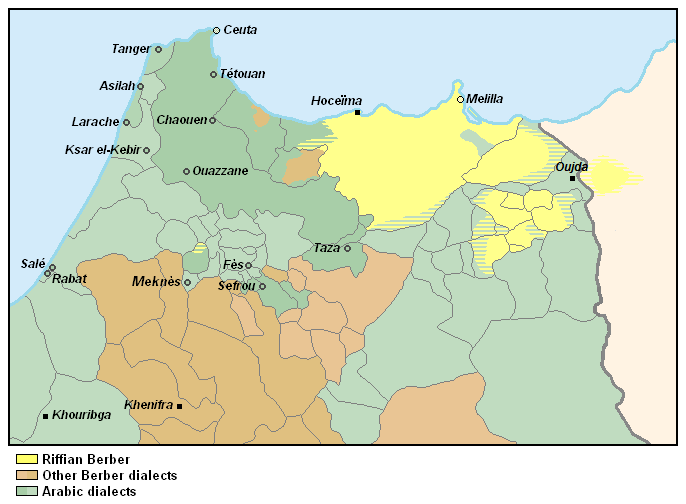
Rifian speaking regions of Morocco (yellow)

Rif

- Ethnic group: Riffian Berbers
  - Proposed state: Republic of the Rif
  - Political organization: Riffian National Party

Started in Morocco during the 1920s, and was revitalized in 2013. The Rif Independence Movement is a charter member of the Organization of Emerging African States. In September of 2023 the PNR was founded becomming the main voice for the Independence movement of the region.

== Mozambique ==
North and Central Mozambique

- Ethnic group: Makua people and more
  - Proposed autonomous region: Rombesia

== Namibia ==
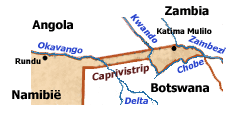
Map of the Caprivi

Caprivi Strip

- Ethnic group: Masubia, Nzanza, Mbowe, Makalahari, MaYeyi, Mampukushu, Makwengari, Mambunda, Matotela, Batoka, Mafwe, Barotse, Leya, Nanzwa, Lujana, Dombe
  - Advocacy group: Movement for the Survival of the River Races of Zambesia
  - Militant organization: Caprivi Liberation Army
  - Political party: Caprivi National African Union, United Democratic Party
  - Proposed state: Zambesia or Caprivi Strip or Barotseland

Rehoboth area

- Ethnic group: Baster
  - Proposed autonomous area: Rehoboth area
  - Political party: The United People's Movement (UPM) Rehoboth Basters (Member of the UNPO)

Tsumkwe Constituency

- Ethnic group: Juǀʼhoansi people
  - Proposed: autonomy for the Juǀʼhoansi people in Tsumkwe Constituency

Bwabwata National Park

- Ethnic group: Khwe
  - Proposed: autonomy for the Khwe

== Niger ==
map of Agadez Region

Agadez Region

- Ethnic group: Tuareg people
  - Proposed: independence for Agadez Region
  - Militant organizations: Patriotic Liberation Front (in an alliance with the CSP-DPA)

== Nigeria ==
Biafra

Biafra

- Ethnic group: Igbo, Anioma, Igede, Igala, Idoma, Ijaw, Kalabari, Ibibio, and Ogoni.
  - Proposed state or autonomous area: Republic of Biafra (defunct)
  - Separatist movements: The Indigenous People of Biafra, Biafra Zionist Movement, Movement for the Actualization of the Sovereign State of Biafra
  - Militant organization: Eastern Security Network
  - Government in exile: Biafran Government in exile
  - Biafra is a charter member of the Organization of Emerging African States

Republic of Oduduwa

- Ethnic group: Yorùbá ethnic groups in Ekiti, Lagos, Ogun, Ondo, Oyo, Osun, Kwara, Òkun in Kogi states in Nigeria, and Akoko in Edo state.
  - Proposed state or autonomous area: Republic of Oduduwa
  - Member of the Unrepresented Nations and Peoples Organization
  - Civic organizations: Ilana Omo Oodua, Nigerian Indigenous Nationalities Alliance for Self-Determination(NINAS)
  - Political parties: Yoruba Party (Based in United Kingdom), Oodua Peoples Congress
  - Movement leaders: Professor Stephen Adebanji Akintoye, Sunday Igboho
  - O'odua Grand Alliance for Independence & Oodua People's Congress Ogafi.org
  - Status: Constitutional Force Majeure

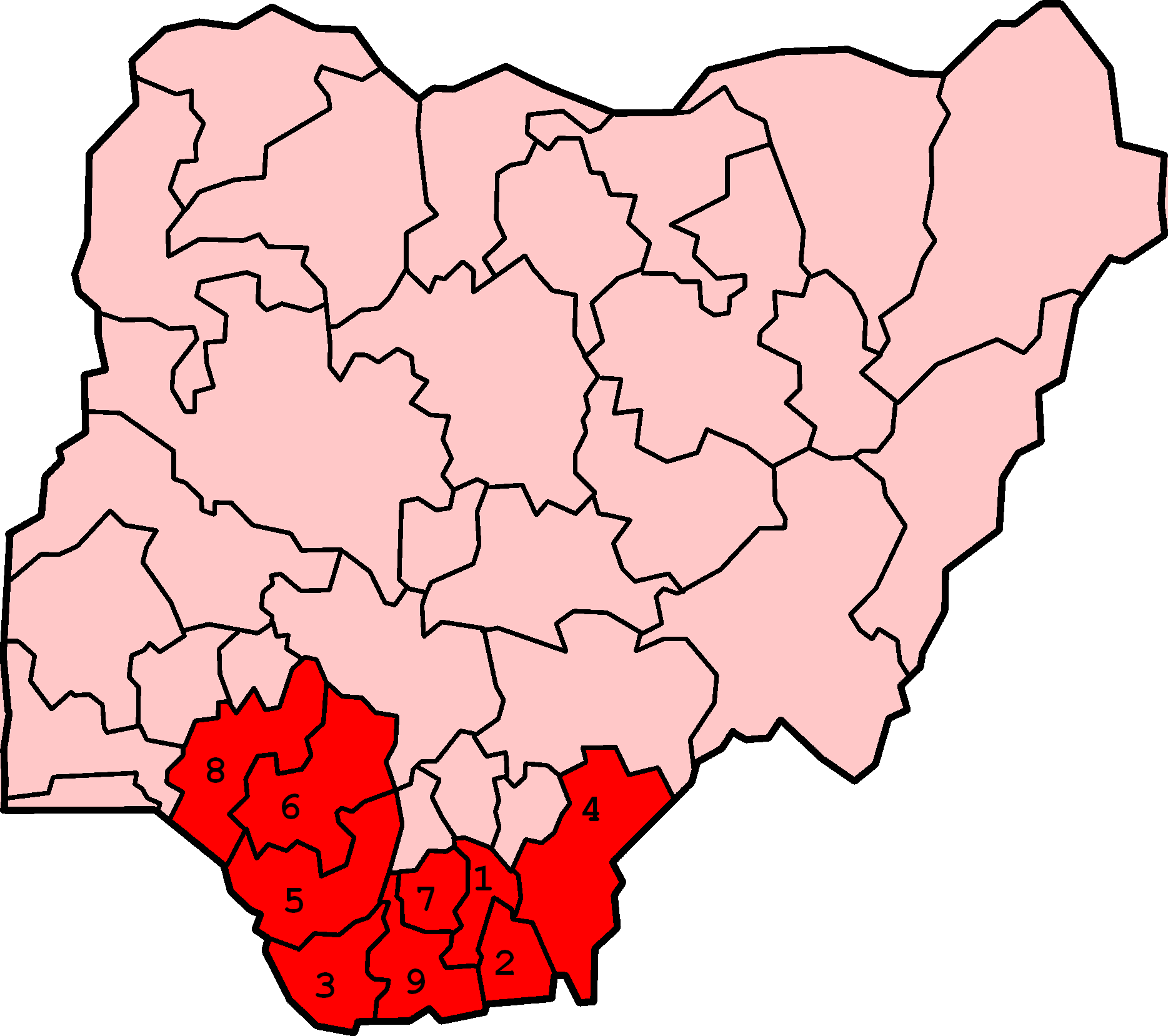
Map of Nigeria numerically showing states typically considered part of the Niger Delta region: 1. Abia, 2. Akwa Ibom, 3. Bayelsa, 4. Cross River, 5. Delta, 6. Edo, 7.Imo, 8. Ondo, 9. Rivers

Niger Delta

- Ethnic group: Urhobo, Isoko, Itsekiri, Ijaw, Ukwuani, Edo, Esan, Ogoni, Kalabari and many more.
  - Proposed: Autonomous regionalism: Niger Delta Republic was declared in February 1965 by Isaac Adaka Boro, but failed to be established and remains an inspiration if not an aspiration.
  - Movement: Movement for the Emancipation of the Niger Delta (MEND) formed in 2006 for the self-determination of the people of the Niger Delta
  - Militant groups: Niger Delta Avengers, Niger Delta Greenland Justice Mandate, Niger Delta People's Volunteer Force (NDPVF),
  - Status: Ongoing war

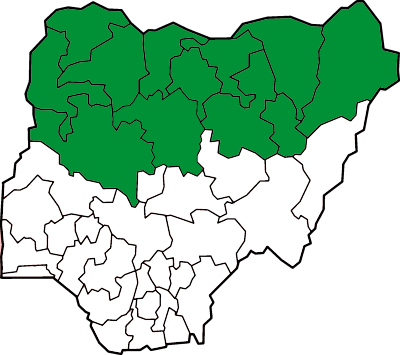
Northern Nigeria, area of the Sharia Law (green)

Arewa

- Ethnic group: Hausa people, Kanuri people
  - Proposed State or Autonomous Area: Arewa Republic
  - Political organisations Arewa Consultative Forum

Rivers State

- Ethnic group: Ogoni people
  - Proposed autonomous region: Ogoniland
  - Advocacy group: Movement for the Survival of the Ogoni People

Kingdom of Benin

- ethnic group: Edo people, Yoruba People, Igbo people
  - proposed: re establishment of the Kingdom of Benin
  - political party: United Kingdom of Great Benin

Middle Belt

- Ethnic group: over 250 ethnic groups
  - Proposed: autonomy for the Middle Belt
  - Advocacy group: Coalition of Indigenous Middle Belt Organizations

Southern Kaduna

- Ethnic group: Adara people
  - Proposed: creation of a Southern Kaduna state within Nigeria
  - Advocacy group: Southern Kaduna People's Union

Benue State

- Ethnic group: Tiv people
  - Proposed state: Republic Of Takuruku

Adamawa State

- Ethnic group: Mumuye people and more
  - Proposed state: Adamawa State

Cross River State

- Ethnic group: Efik people
  - Proposed: independence for Efik people

== Portugal ==
Madeira

- Ethnic group: Madeiran
  - Proposed: Greater autonomy for Madeira
  - Political party: Together for the People

== São Tomé and Príncipe ==
Príncipe

- Ethnic group: Príncipese people
  - Proposed: greater autonomy for Príncipe

== Senegal ==
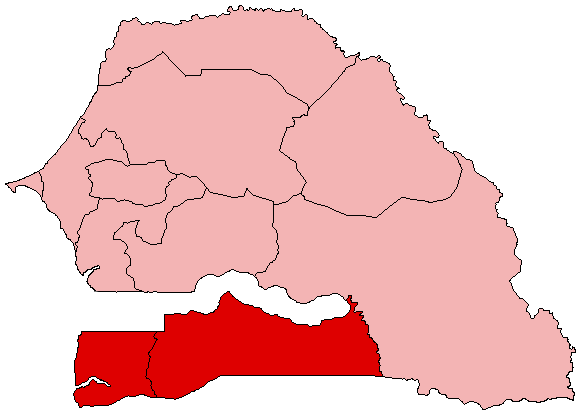
Casamance

Casamance

- Ethnic group: Diola
  - Proposed state: Republic of Casamance
  - Militant organization: Movement of Democratic Forces of Casamance

Touba

- Ethnic group: Wolof people
  - Proposed: autonomy for Touba
  - Advocates: Mouride

== Somalia ==
Puntland Somaliland

- Ethnic group: Somali, primarily the Isaaq clan.
  - De facto state: Somaliland
  - Political organisations: Government of Somaliland
  - Militant organisation: Somaliland Armed Forces

== South Africa ==
Cape Republic

- Proposed state or autonomous area: Cape Republic
  - Ethnic groups: Cape Coloureds, Afrikaners, Khoisan, Cape Malays, Bantu peoples of South Africa (Primarily Xhosa)
  - Political parties: Freedom Front Plus Referendum Party Cape Independence Party
  - Advocacy groups: CapeXit Cape Independence Advocacy Group (CIAG)
- Proposed state or autonomous area: Sovereign State of Good Hope
  - Ethnic groups: Cape Coloureds, Khoisan, Cape Malays, Griqua people
  - Advocacy Groups: Goringhaicona Khoikhoin Indigenous Traditional Council, (Note: Khoi-San is a charter member of the Organization of Emerging African States) First Indigenous Nation of South Africa (FINSA)
  - Status: Unrecognized

Venda

- Ethnic group:Venda people
  - Proposed state:Venda
    - Political Parties: Dabalorivhuwa Patriotic Front

Volkstaat

- Ethnic group: Afrikaners
  - Proposed state or autonomous area: Volkstaat
  - Political Party: Freedom Front Plus (in parliament and member of the Unrepresented Nations and Peoples Organization). Outside parliament: Afrikaner Weerstandsbeweging, National Conservative Party of South Africa, Boerestaat Party Afrikaner Self-determination Party.
  - Advocacy group: Orania Movement
  - Movement: Boere-Vryheidsbeweging
  - Status: Accord on Afrikaner self-determination

Free State

- Proposed State:Orange Free State
  - Ethnic group: Afrikaners
  - Advocacy group: Boervolk

KwaZulu-Natal

- Proposed State: Zululand
  - Ethnic group: Zulu
    - Political Parties:uMkhonto weSizwe Party, Abantu Batho Congress

== South Sudan ==
Rol Naath

- Ethnic group: Nuer People
  - Proposed state: Rol Naath
  - Advocacy group: Rol Naath Independence Movement

Western Equatoria

- Ethnic group: Azande people
  - Proposed: independence for Azande people

Abyei

- Ethnic group: Dinka people
  - Proposed: self rule for Abyei

Equatoria

- Ethnic group: Azande people and more
  - Proposed state: Equatoria or Lado

== Spain ==
Islas Canarias

Secessionist movement

Canary Islands

- People: Canarians
  - Proposed state: Republic of the Canary Islands
    - Political parties (autonomist): Coalición Canaria, Partido Nacionalista Canario, Centro Canario Nacionalista, Nueva Canarias
    - Political parties (secessionist): FREPIC-AWAÑAK, Tanekra, Alternativa Nacionalista Canaria, Alternativa Popular Canaria, Unidad del Pueblo, National Congress of the Canaries
    - Trade union: Intersindical Canaria
    - Youth movement: Azarug

Canary Islands is a charter member of the Organization of Emerging African States

== Sudan ==
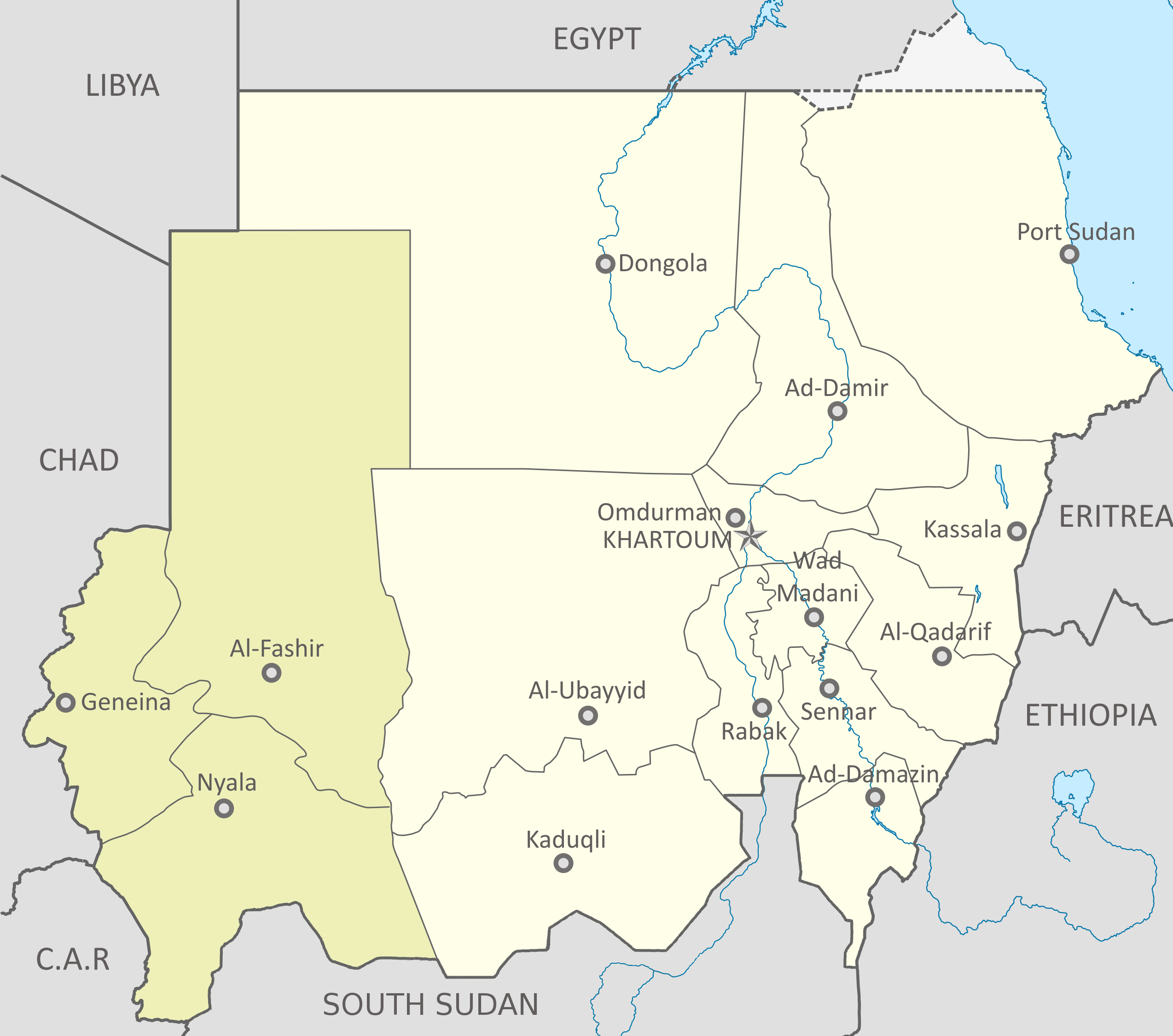
Darfur

Darfur

- Ethnic group: Fur, Arabs, Zaghawa, Masalit, Tama
  - Proposed autonomous area: Darfur or proposed unification with Chad
  - Militant organization: Darfur Liberation Front

Eastern Sudan

- Ethnic group: Beja
  - Proposed autonomous area or state: Beja state
  - Political groups: Beja Congress

Abyei

- Ethnic group: Dinka people
  - Proposed: self rule for Abyei

Northern State and River Nile State

- Ethnic group: Arabs, Copts and Nubians
  - Proposed: creation of an independent River and Sea state, or Kush/Nubia, or unification with Egypt

South Kordofan

- Ethnic group: Nuba people
  - Proposed state: Democratic Republic of Kauda

Gezira State

- Ethnic group: Arabs
  - Proposed: self rule for Gezira State

Blue Nile State

- Ethnic group: Ingessana people
  - Proposed: autonomy for the Blue Nile State

Kordofan

- Ethnic group: Arabs and Nuba peoples
  - Proposed state: Kordofan

== Tanzania ==
Zanzibar

Zanzibar

- Ethnic group: Arabs, Shirazi
  - Proposed state: Zanzibar
  - Political party: Civic United Front (member of Unrepresented Nations and Peoples Organization), Uamsho
    Democratic Party (Tanzania)

Mtwara Region

- Ethnic group: Makonde people
  - Proposed state: Mtwara

Pemba Island

- Ethnic group: Shirazi people
  - Proposed state: Pemba Island

== Togo ==
Est-Mono Prefecture

- Ethnic group: Kabye people
  - Proposed: independence for Est-Mono Prefecture

== Tunisia ==
Djerba

- Ethnic group: Jerba Berber
  - Proposed autonomus area or state: Djerba

== Uganda ==
Acholi

- Proposed: autonomy within Uganda
  - Ethnic group: Acholi Traditionalist Catholicism Christian nationalism, Acholi Nationalism

Buganda

- ethnic group: Baganda
  - Proposed: greater autonomy of Buganda

Rwenzururu

- Ethnic group: Konjo people
  - Proposed: greater autonomy for Rwenzururu

Ankole

- Ethnic group: Nkole people
  - Proposed: restoration of Ankole

Karamoja

- Ethnic group: Karamojong people
  - Proposed: elevation of Karamoja to a region

Tooro Kingdom

- Ethnic group: Tooro people
  - Proposed: elevation of Tooro Kingdom a region

== United Kingdom ==
British Indian Ocean Territory

- Ethnic group: Chagossians
  - Proposed state: Chagos Archipelago or unification with Mauritius
  - Political Parliamentary Group: Chagos Islands (BIOT) All Party Parliamentary Group

== Yemen ==
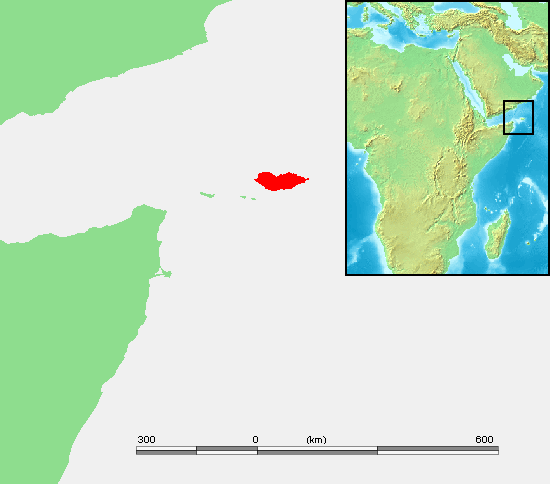
Socotra

Socotra

- Ethnic group: Soqotri people
  - Proposed: autonomy for Socotra
  - Advocacy group: Socotra National Council

== Zambia ==
Barotseland

- Ethnic group: Barotse
  - Proposed state: Barotseland
  - Militant organization: Barotse National Council, Kola Foundation, Cuundu Caitwa, Umodzi Ku'Mawa Forum

Southern Province

- Ethnic group: Tonga people
  - Proposed state: Southern Province

== Zimbabwe ==
Matabeleland

Matabeleland

- Ethnic group: Matabele
  - Proposed state: Mthwakazi
  - Militant organization: Mthwakazi Liberation Front (M.L.F.)
  - Political party: Matabeleland Freedom Party
  - Revolutionary Movement: Mthwakazi Republic Party (M.R.P)
  - Matabele is a charter member of the Organization of Emerging African States.

Manicaland Province

- Ethnic group: Shona people
  - Proposed: autonomy for Manicaland Province

== See also ==
- List of conflicts in Africa
- Lists of active separatist movements
- Lists of historical separatist movements
