= 2015 Bayelsa State House of Assembly election =

State election in Nigeria

The 2015 Bayelsa State House of Assembly election was held on 11 April 2015, to elect members of the Bayelsa State House of Assembly in Nigeria. All the 24 seats were up for election in the Bayelsa State House of Assembly.

Kombowei Benson from PDP representing Southern Ijaw IV constituency was elected Speaker, while Abraham Ingobere from PDP representing Brass III constituency was elected Deputy Speaker.

== Results ==
The result of the election is listed below.

- Owoko Kate from PDP won Southern Ijaw I constituency
- Monday Bubou Obolo from PDP won Southern Ijaw II constituency
- Daniel Baraladei Igali from PDP won Southern Ijaw III constituency
- Kombowei Benson from PDP won Southern Ijaw IV constituency
- Sunny Israel-Goli from APC won Brass I constituency
- Belemote Watson from APGA won Brass II constituency
- Abraham Ingobere from PDP won Brass III constituency
- Peter Pereotubo Akpe from PDP won Sagbama I constituency
- Bernard Kenebai from PDP won Sagbama II constituency
- Salo Adikumo from PDP won Sagbama III constituency
- Tonye Emmanuel Isenah from PDP won Kolokuma/Opokuma I constituency
- Ebiye Tarabina from APGA won Kolokuma/Opokuma II constituency
- Ball Torufade Oyarede from PDP won Ekeremor I constituency
- Omonibeke Kemelayefa from PDP won Ekeremor II constituency
- Michael Ogbere from PDP won Ekeremor III constituency
- Mitema Obordor from PDP won Ogbia I constituency
- Michael Awoli Anapurere from PDP won Ogbia II constituency
- Naomi Ogoli from PDP won Ogbia III constituency
- Parkinson Markmanuel from PDP won Yenagoa I constituency
- Ebiuwou Koku Obiyai from PDP won Yenagoa II constituency
- Gentle Emelah from PDP won Yenagoa III constituency
- Ololo Ebi Ben from PDP won Nembe I constituency
- Ingo Iwowari from PDP won Nembe II constituency
- Obiene Iniyobio from PDP won Nembe III constituency
