= Tonye Emmanuel Isenah =

Nigerian politician (born 1972)

general manager Bayelsa state Housing and Property Development Authority
- Appointed by: Governor of Bayelsa State
- Constituency: Kolokuma/Opokuma Constituency 1

Personal details
- Born: 18 August 1972 (age 53) Kolokuma/Opokuma, Bayelsa State, Nigeria
- Party: Peoples Democratic Party
- Children: Six
- Education: River State University of Science and Technology

Tonye Emmanuel Isenah (born 18 August 1972) is a Nigerian politician who served as Speaker of the 6th Legislative Assembly in the Bayelsa State House of Assembly. He is a member of the Peoples Democratic Party (PDP) and currently serves as general manager and chief executive officer of the Bayelsa State Housing and Property Development Authority.

== Early life and education ==
Isenah was born in Odi, Kolokuma/Opokuma Local Government Area of Bayelsa State. He studied Marketing at Rivers State University of Science and Technology, graduating with a Second Class Honours (Upper Division). He subsequently obtained both a master's degree at the University Of Portharcourt and a PhD in marketing from the River State University Of Science and Technology.

== Political career ==
After graduating, Isenah briefly lectured at Akwa-Ibom State Polytechnic and Niger-Delta University before entering politics. He started his political career as Press Secretary to the Executive Chairman of Kolokuma/Opokuma, followed by appointments as Member of the Odi Rural Development Authority Care-Taker Committee and Chairman of the PDP in Kolokuma/Opokuma Local Government Area. In 2011, Isenah became a member of the Bayelsa State House of Assembly under the Labour Party, serving as Deputy Minority Leader. In 2015, he returned to the Bayelsa State House of Assembly under the PDP and served as Deputy Majority Leader, majority leader, and Chief Whip of the House in the 5th Legislative Assembly. In June 2019, after the 2019 Bayelsa State House of Assembly election, Isenah emerged as Speaker of the Bayelsa State House of Assembly, with Abraham Ingobere as Deputy Speaker and that same year resigned for personal and political reasons. He also served on numerous House Committees, covering various topics.

He is currently the general manager and chief executive officer of the Bayelsa State Housing and Property Development Authority.

== Personal life ==
Isenah is married to Mrs. Blessing Isenah, and they have six children together. His hobbies include sports, traveling, and meeting people.
