= Niger Delta People's Volunteer Force =

The Niger Delta People's Volunteer Force (NDPVF) is one of the largest armed groups in the Niger Delta region of Nigeria and is composed primarily of members of the region's largest ethnic group—the Ijaw people. There are 5.8 million Ijaw people located in the Niger Delta. The group was founded in 1966 in an attempt to gain more control over the region's vast petroleum resources, particularly in Delta State. The NDPVF exists in an area that faces environmental and ecological degradation as a result of the multinational oil corporations in the area. Gas flaring and oil spillages are problems for Ijaw in the region. Nigerians in the Delta also lack availability to lots of their local resources, despite the fact that oil from their area is a major source of revenue for the Nigerian economy. Other local economies have fallen apart due to a focus on the oil economy. Furthermore, many Nigerian youths, who the NDPVF claims to represent, are unemployed and lack access to public services like schools and healthcare. Youth protests in the Niger Delta are frequent. The NDPVF has frequently demanded a greater share of the oil wealth from both the state and federal government and has occasionally supported independence for the Delta region. Until 2005 the group was spearheaded by Alhaji Mujahid Dokubo-Asari, who is viewed by many Delta residents as a folk hero.

== History ==
The Niger Delta People's Volunteer Force was organised in late 2003 after the 2003 Nigerian presidential election by Asari Dokubo and British Columbos Epibade. The idea was conceived by Dokubo after he exited as the president of the Ijaw Youth Council. In his youth, Dokubu was a member of this council, which released the Kaiama Declaration, demanding control of the delta’s energy resources. As he became more radical and militant, his views had diverged from those of the IYC, so he formed this private military operation in order to achieve the demands issued in Kaiama by violence and force.

The inspiration for a militia was gotten from Isaac Boro, who in 1965, declared the Niger Delta Republic. After its founding, on October 1, 2004 the NDPVF called on regional oil companies to shut down their operations. After this threat, a peace agreement was reached with the Nigerian government, which ultimately failed to go into effect. As part of the peace agreement, the federal and state government gave amnesty to militia fighters. Attacks diminished after the signing of the agreement, yet the agreement only focused on short-term goals for protecting the population and fostering an environment of stability.

== Goals ==
The Niger Delta People’s Volunteer Force formed with the goal of fighting for self-determination in the Niger Delta region. They declared their right to own and control resources within their own territory, ending what the NDPVF saw as their suppression and oppression by multinational oil corporations and the Nigerian government. Upon their founding the NDPVF vowed to start a guerilla war, attack foreign oil workers, and disrupt the oil industry. The primary aim of the NDPVF is to protect the interests of the Ijaw ethnic group, which produces oil for Nigeria.

Certain goals of the NDPVF include distributing oil revenues, more equally, creating more jobs for the youth, Ijaw self-determination, and releasing imprisoned Ijaw leaders. The NDPVF is not only an Ijaw group; it garners support from other ethnic groups in the Niger Delta. The NDPVF also cannot be separated from the goals of its leader, Asari Dokubu. The NDPVF also operates under an umbrella group called Movement for the Emancipation of the Niger Delta, and is the most prominent voice under this group.

== Strategies ==
The major strategies of the Niger Delta People’s Volunteer Force are economically sabotaging the oil corporations and disrupting their operations. Tactics include vandalizing oil pipelines and taking local and foreign oil staffers hostage. Most of these strategies aim to hurt the revenue that the federal government makes from oil sales, thereby hoping to influence them to support greater self-determination for the Ijaw people.

The NDPVF also participates in oil bunkering, which is siphoning oil and gas from the oil resources in a form of energy theft, a thievery that is justified because the NDPVF see the oil as belonging to them. Once oil and gas are stolen, they are sold on the black market in order to purchase arms for the movement. Their finances come from this tactic and from local contributions of the Ijaw community.

The NDPVF has a flexible command structure, with the headquarters centered in the Rivers State of Nigeria. The group also operates politically through their unregistered political party, the Niger Delta People’s Salvation Front, which supports policies including justice for the Ijaw people, equitable compensation, and distribution of oil revenues.

The NDPVF, which also operates under the umbrella organization of the Movement for the Emancipation of the Niger Delta (MEND), is not opposed to negotiations with the government, though these negotiations are usually fruitless. MEND has carried on many operations in the region, after the decline of the NDPFV after the arrest of their leader, Dobuku, in 2004. Open rebellion and violence are constant themes in the group’s strategies, usually carried out by the arms they receive from oil bunkering sales.

== See also ==
- Petroleum in Nigeria
- Nigerian Oil Crisis
- Ijaw
- Other Separatist Groups - MASSOB
- Movement for the Emancipation of the Niger Delta
