= Kaiama, Kwara State =

LGA in Kwara, Nigeria

Kaiama Kamma
- LGA and town
- Interactive map of Kaiama
- Coordinates: 9°36′14″N 3°56′26″E
- Country: Nigeria
- State: Kwara State

Government
  - Local Government Chairman and the Head of the Local Government Council: Alhaji Abubakar Abdullahi bio poka

Area
  - Total: 6,971 km^{2} (2,692 sq mi)

Population (2006)
  - Total: 124,164
- Time zone: UTC+1 (WAT)
- Postal code: 242

Kaiama is a local government area and town in northwestern Kwara State, Nigeria.

== Description ==
Kaiama LGA has an area of 6,971 km^{2} and a population of 124,164 at the 2006 census.

The postal code of the area is 242.

The local government area is divided into ten political wards as follows: Kaiama ward 1, Kaiama ward 2, Kaiama ward 3, Kemanji ward, Wojibe ward, Gwanabe ward 1, Gwanabe ward 2, Gwaria ward, Adena ward and Bani ward.

Maimunat Adaji was the area's representative until 2019. She was a member of the All Nigeria Peoples Party (ANPP) and she was elected in 2007 after she switched to be a member of the People's Democratic Party (PDP) party.

Bokobaru is the major language spoken across the local government area. Except for Adena and Bani wards, the natural language of the people of the local government area is Bokobaru. The major language spoken in Bani ward is Fulani while in Adena ward, Yoruba and Hausa languages are the dominant languages.

The people of the Bokobaru speaking towns and villages are called Bokobaru.

The headquarters of the local government area is about 150 kilometres away from Ilorin, the Kwara State capital. The traditional head of Kaiama town is His Royal Highness, Alhaji Omar Shehu Muazu, Kiyaru iv.

Kaiama is popular for its "Gani", an annual festival for initiating and baptising children of royal families.

Kaiama Local Government Area is one of the food baskets of Nigeria, producing agricultural products like yams and their processed form called yam flour, guinea corn, soya beans, cassava, and beans in commercial quantities.

== Climatic Condition ==
Rarely do the seasons' weather patterns coincide, with the dry season being hot and partially cloudy and the wet season being overcast and uncomfortable.

With an average daily high temperature of 96 °F, the hot season lasts for 2.5 months, from February 14 to April 28. With an average high of 99 °F and low of 76 °F, March is the hottest month of the year in Kaiama.

With an average daily maximum temperature below 87 °F, the chilly season lasts for 2.6 months, from July 7 to September 26. In Kaiama, August is the coldest month of the year, with average lows of 72 °F and highs of 84 °F.

== See also ==
- Kaiama Declaration
- Kaiama, Bayelsa
