= 2011 Bayelsa State House of Assembly election =

State election in Nigeria

The 2011 Bayelsa State House of Assembly election was held on 26 April 2011, to elect members of the Bayelsa State House of Assembly in Nigeria. All the 24 seats were up for election in the Bayelsa State House of Assembly.

Nestor Binabo from PDP representing Sagbama II constituency was elected Speaker, while Fini Angaye from PDP representing Kolokuma/Opokuma II constituency was elected Deputy Speaker.

== Results ==
The result of the election is listed below.

- Dorgu Kuroakegha from PDP won Southern Ijaw I constituency
- Monday Bubou Edwin from PDP won Southern Ijaw II constituency
- Igali Baraladei from PDP won Southern Ijaw III constituency
- Kombowei Benson from PDP won Southern Ijaw IV constituency
- Victor Sam-Ateki from PDP won Brass I constituency
- Yousuo Amalanyo from PDP won Brass II constituency
- Abraham Ingobere from KOWA won Brass III constituency
- Akpe Peter from PDP won Sagbama I constituency
- Nestor Binabo from PDP won Sagbama II constituency
- Ebamua Empere from PDP won Sagbama III constituency
- Tonye Isenah from LP won Kolokuma/Opokuma I constituency
- Fini Angaye from PDP won Kolokuma/Opokuma II constituency
- Agatha Akpobo-Ere Goma from PDP won Ekeremor I constituency
- Omonibeke Kemelayefa from PDP won Ekeremor II constituency
- Victor Prezi from PPA won Ekeremor III constituency
- Azibola Paul Omekwe from PDP won Ogbia I constituency
- Obedient Prank Omoto from PDP won Ogbia II constituency
- Walamam Samuel Igrubia from PDP won Ogbia III constituency
- Alfred Egba from PDP won Yenagoa I constituency
- Fekoweimo Ebipadei from PDP won Yenagoa II constituency
- Emelah Gentle from PDP won Yenagoa III constituency
- Obuebite R. Jonathan from PDP won Nembe I constituency
- Ayobegha James from PDP won Nembe II constituency
- Obiene Iniyobiyo from PDP won Nembe III constituency
