= 2019 Bayelsa State House of Assembly election =

Election in Nigeria

The 2019 Bayelsa State House of Assembly election was held on 9 March 2019, to elect members of the Bayelsa State House of Assembly in Nigeria. All the 24 seats were up for election in the Bayelsa State House of Assembly.

Tonye Isenah from PDP representing Kolokuma/Opokuma constituency was elected Speaker, while Abraham Ingobere from PDP representing Brass III constituency was elected Deputy Speaker.

== Results ==
The result of the election is listed below.

- Ayah Bonny from PDP won Southern Ijaw I constituency
- Monday Obolo from PDP won Southern Ijaw II constituency
- Malon Moses from PDP won Southern Ijaw III constituency
- Igbadiwe MacDonald from PDP won Southern Ijaw IV constituency
- Charles Daniel from APC won Brass I constituency
- Timi Agala Omubo from APC won Brass II constituency
- Abraham Ingobere from PDP won Brass III constituency
- Onyinke Godbless from PDP won Sagbama I constituency
- Ben Kenebai from PDP won Sagbama II constituency
- Adikumo Salo from PDP won Sagbama III constituency
- Tonye Isenah from PDP won Kolokuma/Opokuma I constituency
- Fafi Wisdom from PDP won Kolokuma/Opokuma II constituency
- Tare Porri from PDP won Ekeremor I constituency
- Wilson Ayakpo from APC won Ekeremor II constituency
- Michael Ogbere from PDP won Ekeremor III constituency
- Obodor Mitema from PDP won Ogbia I constituency
- Gibson Munalayefa from PDP won Ogbia II constituency
- Ogoli Naomi from PDP won Ogbia III constituency
- Oforji Oboku from PDP won Yenagoa I constituency
- Ebiwou Koku-Obiyai from PDP won Yenagoa II constituency
- Elemefuro Teddy from PDP won Yenagoa III constituency
- Ben Ololo from PDP won Nembe I constituency
- Edward Irigha from APC won Nembe II constituency
- Douglas Samson from APC won Nembe III constituency
