= Zanzibar independence movement =

Independence movement in Zanzibar

Zanzibari independence is a political ambition of some political parties, advocacy groups, and individuals of Zanzibar, a semi-autonomous region territory within Tanzania, to become an independent sovereign state.

== Background ==
=== Sultanate of Zanzibar ===
The Portuguese arrived in East Africa in 1498, where they found several independent towns on the coast, with Muslim Arabic-speaking elites. While the Portuguese travellers describe them as "black", they made a clear distinction between the Muslim and non-Muslim populations. Their relations with these leaders were mostly hostile, but during the sixteenth century, they firmly established their power and ruled with the aid of tributary sultans. The Portuguese presence was relatively limited, leaving administration in the hands of the local leaders and power structures already present. This system lasted until 1631, when the Sultan of Mombasa massacred the Portuguese inhabitants. For the remainder of their rule, the Portuguese appointed European governors. The strangling of trade and diminished local power led the Swahili elites in Mombasa and Zanzibar to invite Omani aristocrats to assist them in driving the Europeans out.

In 1698, Zanzibar came under the influence of the Sultanate of Oman. There was a brief revolt against Omani rule in 1784. Local elites invited Omani merchant princes to settle in Zanzibar in the first half of the nineteenth century, preferring them to the Portuguese. Many locals today continue to emphasise that indigenous Zanzibaris had invited Seyyid Said, the first Busaidi sultan, to their island. Claiming a patronclient relationship with powerful families was a strategy used by many Swahili coast towns from at least the fifteenth century.

=== British protectorate ===
Control of Zanzibar eventually came into the hands of the British Empire; part of the political impetus for this was the 19th century movement for the abolition of the slave trade. Zanzibar was the centre of the Arab slave trade, and in 1822, the British consul in Muscat put pressure on Sultan Said to end the slave trade. Said came under increasing pressure from the British to abolish slavery, and in 1842 the British government told the Zanzibari ruler it wished to abolish the slave trade to Arabia, Oman, Persia, and the Red Sea.

In 1890, Zanzibar became a protectorate (not a colony) of the United Kingdom. This status meant it continued to be under the sovereignty of the Sultan of Zanzibar.

=== Zanzibar revolution and merger with Tanganyika ===
On 10 December 1963, the Protectorate that had existed over Zanzibar since 1890 was terminated by the United Kingdom. Rather, by the Zanzibar Act 1963 of the United Kingdom, the UK ended the Protectorate and made provision for full self-government in Zanzibar as an independent country within the Commonwealth. Upon the Protectorate being abolished, Zanzibar became a constitutional monarchy within the Commonwealth under the Sultan.

However, just a month later, on 12 January 1964 Sultan Jamshid bin Abdullah was deposed during the Zanzibar Revolution. The Sultan fled into exile, and the Sultanate was replaced by the People's Republic of Zanzibar, a socialist government led by the Afro-Shirazi Party (ASP). Over 20,000 people were killed – mostly Arabs and Indians – and many of them fled the country as a consequence of the revolution.

In April 1964, the republic merged with mainland Tanganyika. This United Republic of Tanganyika and Zanzibar was soon renamed, blending the two names, as the United Republic of Tanzania, within which Zanzibar remains an autonomous region.

== Demographic and cultural differences ==
=== Ethnicity ===
The people of Zanzibar are of diverse ethnic origins. The first permanent residents of Zanzibar seem to have been the ancestors of the Bantu Hadimu and Tumbatu, who began arriving from the African Great Lakes mainland around AD 1000. They belonged to various mainland ethnic groups and, on Zanzibar, generally lived in small villages. They did not coalesce to form larger political units.

During Zanzibar's brief period of independence in the early 1960s, the major political cleavage was between the Shirazi (Zanzibar Africans), who made up approximately 56% of the population, and the Zanzibar Arabs—the bulk of whom arrived from Oman in the 1800s—made up approximately 17%. Today, Zanzibar is inhabited mostly by ethnic Swahili. There are also a number of Arabs, as well as some ethnic Persian, Somalis, and Indian people.

=== Religion ===
Zanzibar Religions (2010 est.)
| Islam | 98.9% |
| Christianity | 0.6% |
| Indigenous | 0.5% |
Source: CIA World Factbook.

Unlike mainland Tanzania, Zanzibar's population is almost entirely Muslim, with a small Christian minority containing around 22 000 Christians. Other religious groups that are represented include Hindus, Jains and Sikhs.

=== Languages ===
Zanzibaris speak Swahili (Kiswahili), a Bantu language that is extensively spoken in the African Great Lakes region and indeed most of Tanzania where it is the de facto national and official language. However unlike the mainland, many local residents also speak Arabic, French and/or Italian, with Arabic a recognised minority language.

=== Cuisine ===
Given the multi-cultural background of the island, Zanzibari cuisine is very distinct, with a mixture of various culinary traditions, including Bantu, Arab, Portuguese, Indian, British and even Chinese cuisine.

== Governance ==
=== Relationship with the mainland ===
As a semi-autonomous part of Tanzania, Zanzibar has its own government, known as the Revolutionary Government of Zanzibar. It is made up of the Revolutionary Council and House of Representatives. The House of Representatives has a similar composition to the National Assembly of Tanzania. Fifty members are elected directly from constituencies to serve five-year terms; 10 members are appointed by the President of Zanzibar; 15 special seats are for women members of political parties that have representation in the House of Representatives; six members serve ex officio, including all regional commissioners and the attorney general. Five of these 81 members are then elected to represent Zanzibar in the National Assembly.

Unguja has three administrative regions: Zanzibar Central/South, Zanzibar North and Zanzibar Urban/West. Pemba has two: Pemba North and Pemba South.

Concerning the independence and sovereignty of Zanzibar, Tanzania Prime Minister Mizengo Pinda said on 3 July 2008 that there was "nothing like the sovereignty of Zanzibar in the Union Government unless the Constitution is changed in future". Zanzibar House of Representatives members from both the ruling party, Chama Cha Mapinduzi, and the opposition party, Civic United Front, disagreed and stood firmly in recognizing Zanzibar as a fully autonomous state.

=== Zanzibari politics ===
Zanzibar has a government of national unity, with the president of Zanzibar being Hussein Ali Mwinyi, since 1 November 2020. There are many political parties in Zanzibar, but the most popular parties are the Chama Cha Mapinduzi (CCM) and the Civic United Front (CUF). Since the early 1990s, the politics of the archipelago have been marked by repeated clashes between these two parties.

Contested elections in October 2000 led to a massacre on 27 January 2001 when, according to Human Rights Watch, the army and police shot into crowds of protestors, killing at least 35 and wounding more than 600. Those forces, accompanied by ruling party officials and militias, also went on a house-to-house rampage, indiscriminately arresting, beating, and sexually abusing residents. Approximately 2,000 temporarily fled to Kenya.

Violence erupted again after another contested election on 31 October 2005, with the CUF claiming that its rightful victory had been stolen from it. Nine people were killed.

Following 2005, negotiations between the two parties aiming at the long-term resolution of the tensions and a power-sharing accord took place, but they suffered repeated setbacks. The most notable of these took place in April 2008, when the CUF walked away from the negotiating table following a CCM call for a referendum to approve what had been presented as a done deal on the power-sharing agreement.

In November 2009, the then-president of Zanzibar, Amani Abeid Karume, met with CUF secretary-general Seif Sharif Hamad at the State House to discuss how to save Zanzibar from future political turmoil and to end the animosity between them. This move was welcomed by many, including the United States. It was the first time since the multi-party system was introduced in Zanzibar that the CUF agreed to recognize Karume as the legitimate president of Zanzibar.

A proposal to amend Zanzibar's constitution to allow rival parties to form governments of national unity was adopted by 66.2 percent of voters on 31 July 2010.

The autonomous status of Zanzibar is viewed as comparable to Hong Kong as suggested by some scholars, and with some recognizing the island as an "African Hong Kong".

Nowadays, The Alliance for Change and Transparency-Wazalendois (ACT-Wazalendo) is considered the main opposition political party of semi-autonomous Zanzibar. The constitution of Zanzibar requires the party that comes in second in the polls to join a coalition with the winning party. ACT-Wazalendo joined a coalition government with the islands' ruling party, Chama Cha Mapinduzi, in December 2020 after Zanzibar disputed elections.

=== Sport ===
Football is the most popular sport in Zanzibar, overseen by the Zanzibar Football Association., which is separate from Zanzibar is an associate member of the Confederation of African Football (CAF), but not of FIFA. This means that the Zanzibar national football team is not eligible to enter national CAF competitions, such as the African Nations Cup, but Zanzibar's Football Clubs get representation at the CAF Confederation Cup and the CAF Champions League.

The national team participates in non-FIFA Football tournaments such as the FIFI Wild Cup, and the ELF Cup. Because Zanzibar is not a member of FIFA, their team is not eligible for the FIFA World Cup.

The Zanzibar Football Association also has a Premier League for the top clubs, which was created in 1981, again, separate from the Tanzanian Premier League.

=== Media ===
The media in Zanzibar come under a different set of regulations to their counterparts in mainland Tanzania.

== Causes ==
Various reasons have been given for the on-going secessionist movement, including historical independence, socio-economic disparity, cultural differences and ethnic tensions between Arab islanders and black African mainlanders. It has also been noted that radical islamist groups support independence capitalising on the political turbulence related to electoral issues.

== Organisations ==
=== Pro-independence political groups ===
- The Democratic Party is a far-right political party in mainland Tanzania, registered on 7 June 2002, calls for the dissolution of the Union Government of Tanzania and has openly campaigned for the separation of the islands of Zanzibar and Pemba from mainland Tanganyika. The DP supports the expulsion of minorities from the mainland.
- The Civic United Front is a Zanzibari autonomist liberal party. Although nationally based, most of the CUF's support comes from the Zanzibar islands of Unguja and Pemba. The party is a member of Liberal International and the Unrepresented Nations and Peoples Organization.
- Uamsho, an abbreviation of The Association for Islamic Mobilisation and Propagation is an Islamist separatist group legally registered in Zanzibar. Led by Farid Hadi Ahmed, Uamsho seeks independence for Zanzibar from Tanzania. Analysts have said that Uamsho has been gaining popularity following the disenchantment of supporters of Zanzibar's main opposition Civic United Front (CUF) party after its decision to form a government of national unity with the ruling Chama Cha Mapinduzi (CCM) Party. There are suggestions that the Zanzibar acid attack has been linked to their supporters.

=== Anti-independence political groups ===
- Chama Cha Mapinduzi, translated as Party of the Revolution, is a unionist party created on February 5, 1977, under the leadership of Julius Nyerere, through the merger of the Tanganyika African National Union (TANU), the ruling party in Tanganyika, and the Afro-Shirazi Party (ASP), the ruling party in Zanzibar.
