= Steve Sinikiem Azaiki =

Nigerian politician and public servant

Stephen Sinikiem Azaiki is a Nigerian academic, politician, and public servant, currently serving as the representative for the Yenagoa/Kolokuma/Opokuma Federal Constituency in the Nigerian House of Representatives.
