= Ijaw Youth Council =

Civil right Organization

The Ijaw Youth Council (IYC), founded on 11 December 1988, is a sociopolitical organization in Nigeria, representing the interest of the Ijaw people, the fourth largest ethnic groups in Nigeria.

The group began in Kaiama, Bayelsa State, during a period of intense activism and agitation for the rights of the Niger Delta people. It emerged as a response to the longstanding grievances over environmental degradation, economic marginalization and political disenfranchisement faced by the Ijaw people and other communities in the oil-rich Niger Delta.

Dr. Felix Tuodolo was the council's first president.

== Founding and purpose ==
The IYC was established following the Kaiama Declaration, a document that articulated the demands of the Ijaw people for greater control over their natural resources, environmental protection, and self-determination.

The organization's primary purpose is to advocate for the rights and the interest of the Ijaw people, particularly in relation to exploitation of oil and gas resources in their land.

== Advocacy and activism ==
The IYC has been actively involved in various forms of advocacy, ranging from peaceful protests and negotiations to more militant actions. The group is known for its strong stance against the exploitation of the Niger Delta's resources by multinational oil companies and the Nigerian government without adequate compensation or development in the region.

The organization has also been involved in national issues advocating for federalism, resource control, and protection of minority rights in Nigeria.

== Leadership and influence ==
The IYC has produced several notable leaders who have played significant roles in Nigerian politics and the Niger Delta struggle. The organization's leadership is influential in local and national politics, and its decisions can impact the broader sociopolitical landscape in the Niger Delta.

== Current relevance ==
Today the IYC continues to be a vocal advocate for the Ijaw people and the Niger Delta, engaging in dialogues with government and stakeholders to address the ongoing challenges of the region.

The Ijaw Youth Council Worldwide, currently led by Sir Jonathan Lokpobiri as president, remains a key player in the socio-political dynamics of Nigeria, particularly in the context of the Niger Delta's ongoing struggles for environmental justice and resource control.
