= 2023 Bayelsa State House of Assembly election =

Election in Nigeria

The 2023 Bayelsa State House of Assembly election was held on 18 March 2023, to elect members of the Bayelsa State House of Assembly in Nigeria. All 24 seats were up for election in the Bayelsa State House of Assembly.

Abraham Ingobere from PDP representing Brass III constituency, the immediate past speaker of the 6th house of Assembly was re-elected Speaker, while Michael Ogbere from PDP representing Ekeremor Constituency III was elected Deputy Speaker.

== Results ==
The result of the election is listed below,

- Felix Bonny-Ayah from PDP won Southern Ijaw I constituency
- Bubou-Monday Obolo from PDP won Southern Ijaw II constituency
- Malon Moses from PDP won Southern Ijaw III constituency
- Victor-Ben Selekaye from APC won Southern Ijaw IV constituency
- Charles Daniel from PDP won Brass I constituency
- Omubo Timinyo from APC won Brass II constituency
- Abraham Ingobere from PDP won Brass III constituency
- Onyinke Godbless from PDP won Sagbama I constituency
- Bernard Kenebai from PDP won Sagbama II constituency
- Ebizi Brown from PDP won Sagbama III constituency
- Werinipre Pamoh from PDP won Kolokuma/Opokuma I constituency
- Fafi Wisdom from PDP won Kolokuma/Opokuma II constituency
- Tare Porri from PDP won Ekeremor I constituency
- Mitin Living from PDP won Ekeremor II constituency
- Michael Ogbere from PDP won Ekeremor III constituency
- Obodor Mitema from PDP won Ogbia I constituency
- Gibson Munalayefa from PDP won Ogbia II constituency
- Ogoli Naomi from PDP won Ogbia III constituency
- Egba Ayibanengiyefa from PDP won Yenagoa I constituency
- Waikumo Amakoromo from APGA won Yenagoa II constituency
- Teddy Tombara from PDP won Yenagoa III constituency
- George Braah-Okigbanyo from APGA won Nembe I constituency
- Edward Brigidi from APC won Nembe II constituency
- Douglas Samson from APC won Nembe III constituency
