= Isaac Boro Park =

Park in Port Harcourt, Nigeria

- Interactive map of Isaac Boro Park
- Type: Public park
- Location: Old GRA, Rivers State
- Coordinates: 4°47′16″N 7°0′19″E
- Operator: City of Port Harcourt

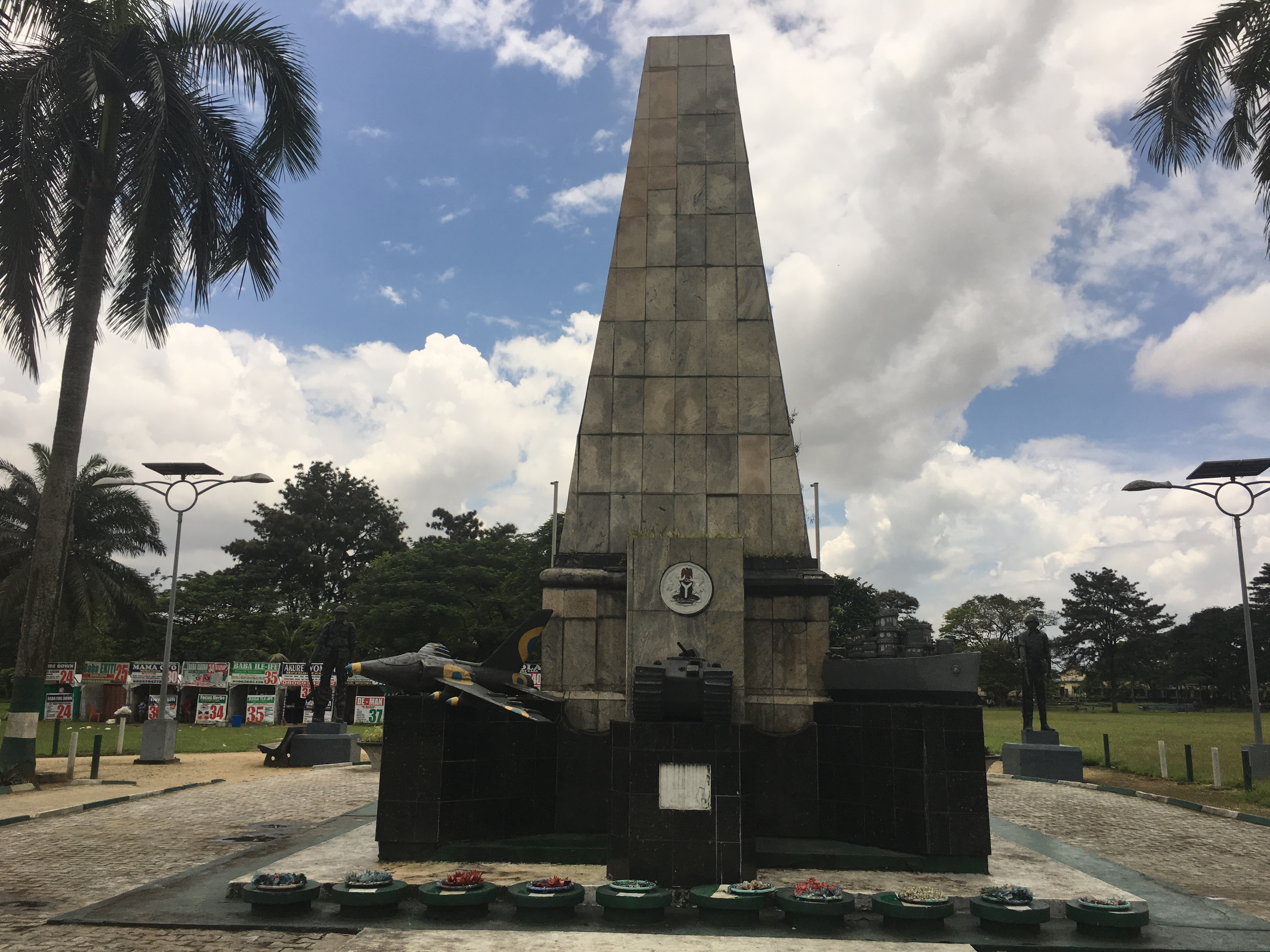

Isaac Boro Park is a public park and outdoor recreation area located along the Old GRA neighborhood of Rivers State capital, Port Harcourt. The park is named after Isaac Boro, who was one of the pioneers of minority rights activism in Nigeria. The geographical coordinates of the park are: 4°47'16"N (4.787960), 7°0'19"E (7.005517).

Situated just opposite the Mile One Flyover, Isaac Boro Park is home to baseball and softball in Port Harcourt. On numerous occasions between 2006 and 2013, the park hosted the annual international trade fair and continues to serve as venue for memorable events such as the Armed Forces Remembrance Day, the Workers' Day and the National Youth Service send-off parade ceremonies.

== Geography ==
Isaac Boro Park is bounded to the south by Bauchi Street, north by Ogbodo Street and Blue Street, west by Ikwerre Road and to the east by Ohia Street.
