= Mombasa Republic =

Proposed state in East Africa

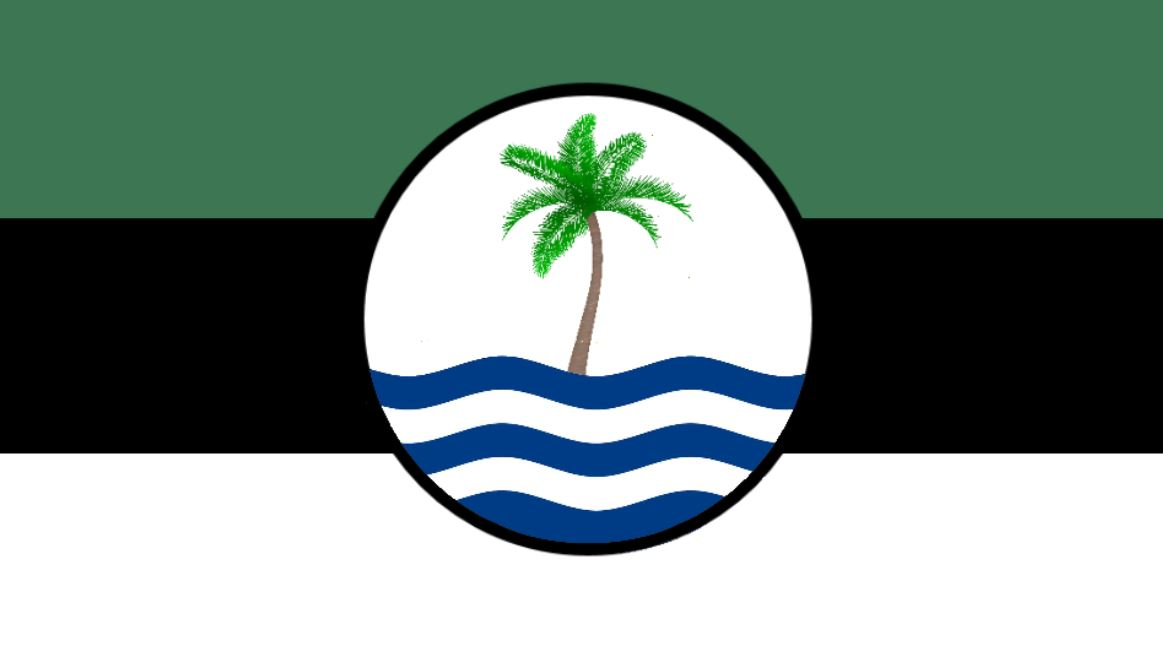
Mombasa Republican Council (MRC) independence Flag

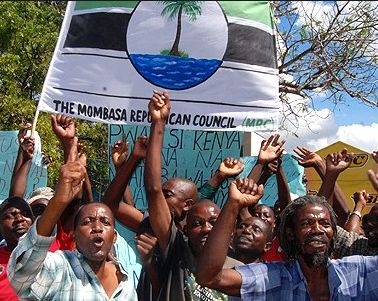
Mombasa Republican Council protests in Kenya

The Mombasa Republic is a proposed state that would encompass the former Coast Province of Kenya. The Mombasa Republican Council (MRC) is the main separatist organisation to argue that Mombasa should secede from Kenya to become an independent state. They argued that secession would liberate the people of the coast province from marginalization by successive governments in Kenya. Their slogan is Pwani Si Kenya ("The Coast is not Kenya").

The MRC is a constitutional organization and aims to represent persons of all religions and tribes living in the Mombasa coastal strip. Mombasa has a unique cultural identity and history that long predates the current colonial borders of Africa. It has both Muslim and Christian supporters. The leader of the group is Omar Mwamnuadzi. The group denies claims by government officials that it has forged links with Somalia's militant Islamist group al-Shabaab.

The Organization of Emerging African States (OEAS) supports the MRC program as a legitimate expression of self-determination under the African Charter on Human and Peoples' Rights.

== History ==
The Mombasa Republican Council was formed in 1999 to address perceived political and economic discrimination against the people of the Coast Province. The group traces its secession claims to the 1895 and 1963 agreements transferring the ten-mile strip of land along the coast to Kenya from Zanzibar. Some critics characterize these British agreements as a form of bribery designed to facilitate colonization of the interior. The group contests these agreements as invalid because the British Government enacted them without the consent of coastal stakeholders, claiming that the state of Kenya has failed to honor the provisions designed to protect the coastal population.

In 2014, Omar Mwamnuadzi was arrested along with 11 other MRC members and charged with holding an illegal gathering and planning to breach the peace.

== Secession claims ==
The Mombasa Republican Council was dormant until 2008, when it first raised claims that Mombasa should secede from Kenya to become an independent state. They argued that secession would liberate the people of the coast province from marginalization by successive governments in Kenya. In response, the government declared the group to be an illegal organization, along with 33 other groups.

The Mombasa Republican Council contested the government's decision in court. The High Court in Mombasa lifted the ban, and ruled that claiming the group was illegal was unconstitutional.

== Post-election violence ==
MRC members have been associated with violence, beginning from around the time of the 2013 election.

In June 2022, 81 suspected members of the MRC in Kilifi County were arrested while undertaking oaths to take over the leadership of the country, with violence continuing as part of the buildup to the August 2022 elections.
