= Agazian Movement =

Far-right Eritrean diaspora nationalist movement

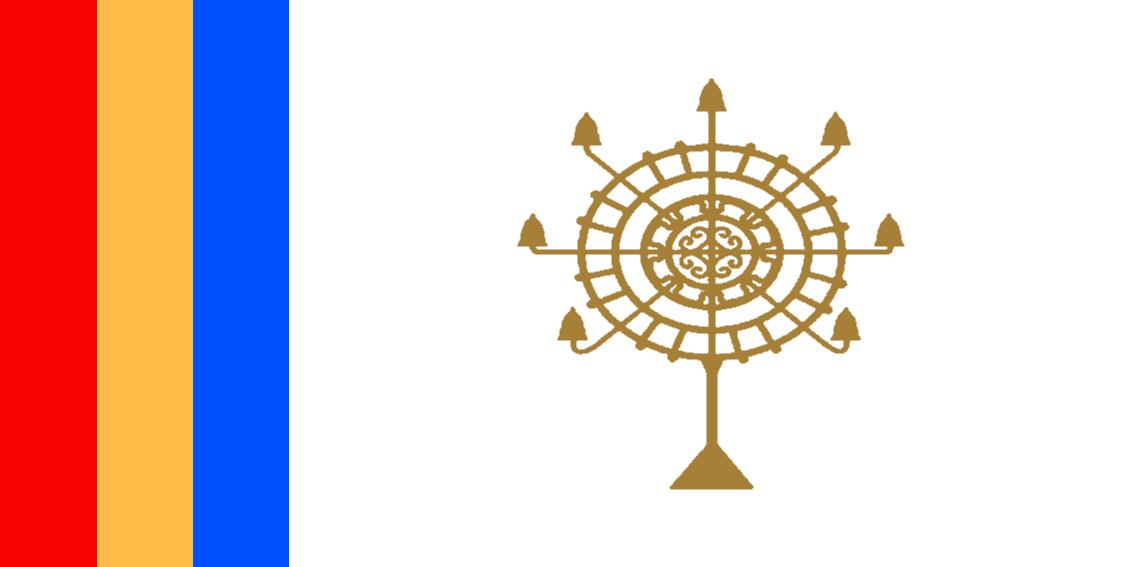
Flag variant of the Agazia movement

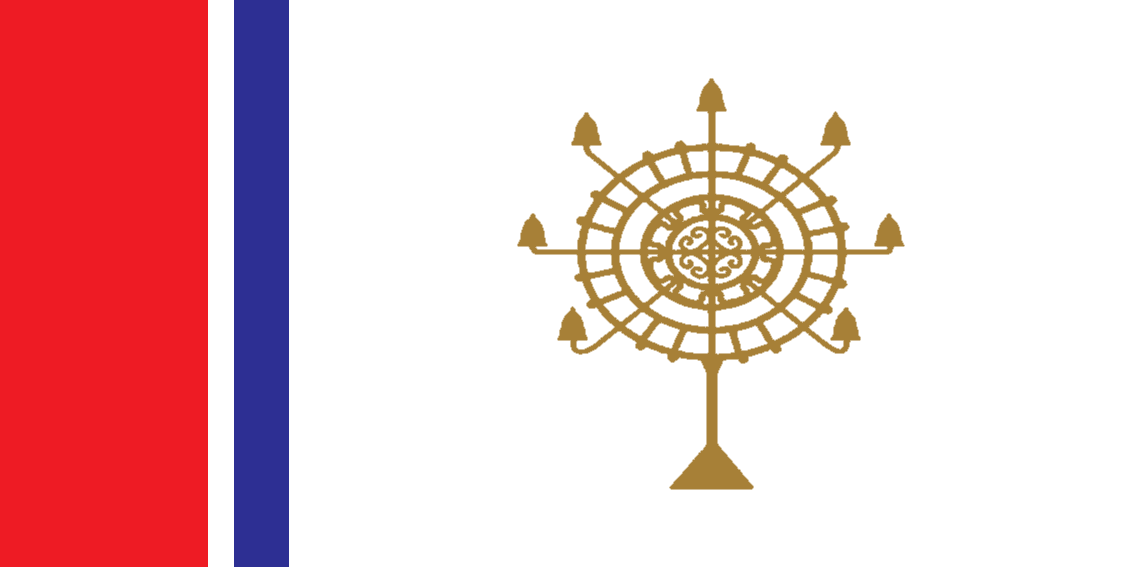
Flag of the Agazia movement

The Agazian Movement is a far-right nationalist movement that emerged within the Eritrean diaspora around 2016. It seeks to establish a Tigrinyan Orthodox-Christian state in what is currently Eritrea and parts of Ethiopia particularly the Tigray region. The movement is characterized by its anti-Muslim rhetoric, militant politics, and its impact on the already divided Eritrean opposition.

The movement's primary objective is the establishment of an Agazian state that would unite Tigrinya-speaking Orthodox Christians from both Eritrea and the Tigray region in Ethiopia. This vision includes rejecting the current Eritrean state, which the Agazian Movement views as a product of colonialism. The movement's leaders advocate for the expansion of the nations territorial boundaries, arguing that they were artificially demarcated by colonial powers.
