= Kaiama, Bayelsa State =

Town in Bayelsa, Nigeria

Coordinates: 5°06′43″N 6°18′08″E

Ijaw National Academy, Kaiama, Bayelsa state, 2021

Kaiama is a town in Bayelsa State, Nigeria, and serves as the administrative headquarters of the Kolokuma/Opokuma Local Government Area. It was the birthplace of Isaac Adaka Boro, an Ijaw nationalist who proclaimed the Niger Delta Republic in 1966.

== Climate ==
In Kaiama, the wet season is overcast and warm, the dry season is hot and mostly cloudy, and it is oppressive year round.

== See also ==
- Kaiama Declaration
