= 2013 Zanzibar acid attack =

Crime in Zanzibar, Tanzania

On 7 August 2013, two men on motorcycles threw acid on 18-year-old British volunteer teachers Katie Gee and Kirstie Trup near Stone Town, Zanzibar, Tanzania.

== Background ==
Katie Gee and Kirstie Trup are from Hampstead, London. They were volunteering at a local school in Zanzibar.

== Prior incidents ==
In November 2012, Sheik Fadhil Soraga was the victim of an acid attack.

In February, a Roman Catholic priest was shot to death and a church was burned down. In the past, another priest was shot and wounded and other churches were also burned.

According to a close friend of the two, a Muslim woman struck Ms. Trup in the face for singing in public during Ramadan.

== Acid attack ==
The two were nearing the end of their one-month volunteer teaching when the attack happened. The attack happened at 7:15 PM on 7 August 2013. The two women were walking on the street on their way to dinner when their attackers approached and threw sulphuric acid on them.

Both women suffered burns to their face, hands, and chest. Trup suffered lesser injuries because she was walking on the side of the curb away from the attackers, so was doused with less liquid.

== Aftermath ==
Both women quickly entered a nearby beachside restaurant to wash away the acid. Two tourists stopped to help them into a car that rushed them to a local hospital. A lack of saline solution forced them to be airlifted to the Tanzanian mainland. The two subsequently returned to London to be treated by specialists. Gee lost an ear and underwent over fifty operations as of 10 May 2018, but has expressed determination to overcome the attack and a desire for justice.

Five men were questioned by the police as of August 9, 2013. Initially, no arrests were made for committing the acid attack and the motive for the attack was unknown.

In 2013, police arrested Sheikh Issa Ponda Issa after he ran from the police. He was wanted for a possible connection to the acid attack. Mr. Ponda had been previously convicted of inciting religious hatred. A reward of 10 million Tanzanian shillings had been offered for information leading to the capture of the attackers.

In 2015, two suspected terrorists, members of Uamsho, were arrested and charged for the attack. Uamsho was reportedly linked to Boko Haram, a terrorist organization known for its use of acid.
