= Riffian National Party =

Riffian National Party الحزب الوطني الريفي Parti National Rifain
- Leader: Ridouane Oussama
- Founded: September 2023
- Headquarters: Brussels (de facto)
- Ideology: Riffian Nationalism; Self-determination

Party flag

Website
- parti-national-rifain.com

The Riffian National Party (French: Parti National Rifain, PNR) is a political party aiming for international recognition and restoration of the Republic of the Rif in Northern Morocco, as a state independent from Morocco.

== History ==
Background

The movement is rooted in several instances of indigenous territory being colonized, ruled, and marginalized by different powers and the riots and civil disobedience resulting from it, including the 1958 Rif riots and the 2017 Hirak Rif protests. While Riffian independence has been a topic of protest and organization in the past.

International presents

During the same time as it's founding in 2023 they opened and inaugurated it's representative office in Algiers. Vice President Jaber El Ghadioui also requested Algeria to recognize the Republic of the Rif.

In September 2026 the party organised a demonstration on the 105th anniversary of the founding of the Republic of the Rif In October 2026, the party's leader Oussama Ridouane said that the Spanish government had officially recognised the party's Spanish branch.

The PNR directly accused the Makhzen during the 2026 migrant crisis and held it responsible for the crisis, ruling out a spontaneous situation and describing it as a "deliberate criminal policy". It also questioned European funding for Morocco, arguing that rather than helping to prevent migration, it ends up funding a government that uses migration as a tool to exert diplomatic pressure.
