= Kaiama Declaration =

Declaration of ijaw youths for resource control by ijaws

The Kaiama Declaration was issued by the Ijaw Youth Council (IYC) of Nigeria on 11 December 1998 to attribute the political crisis in Nigeria to the struggle for the control of oil mineral resources, while asserting that the degradation of the environment of Ijawland by transnational oil companies and the Nigerian State arise mainly because Ijaw people have been robbed of their natural rights to ownership and control of their land and resources. The council was formed in the town of Kaiama after 5,000 Ijaw people representing over 40 Ijaw clans, chose to articulate their aspirations for the Ijaw people, and to demand an end to 40 years of environmental damage and underdevelopment in the region.

== Background ==
Kaiama is a small town in Western Ijaw, about half an hour's drive from Yenagoa, the capital of Bayelsa State. Historically Kaiama is famous for being the birthplace of Major Isaac Adaka Boro, an Ijaw nationalist who in 1966 proclaimed "the Niger Delta People's Republic".

On 11 December 1998, a group of 5000 Ijaw presented the Kaiama Declaration, which stated that all land and natural resources (including mineral resources) within the Ijaw territory "belong to Ijaw communities"; and also demanded that the IYC cease to recognize all decrees "enacted without our participation and consent". In line with these statements, the youths also called for the military to withdraw from the region, and warned oil companies that they would be regarded as a "real enemy" if they relied on military protection.

== The Kaiama Declaration ==
THE KAIAMA DECLARATION BY THE IJAW YOUTHS OF THE NIGER DELTA BEING COMMUNIQUE ISSUED AT THE END OF THE ALL IJAW YOUTHS CONFERENCE WHICH WAS HELD IN THE TOWN OF KAIAMA THIS 11TH DAY OF DECEMBER 1998.

INTRODUCTION

We, Ijaw youths drawn from over five hundred communities from over 40 clans that make up the Ijaw nation and representing 25 representative organisations met, today, in Kaiama to deliberate on the best way to ensure the continuous survival of the indigenous peoples of the Ijaw ethnic nationality of the Niger Delta within the Nigerian state.

After exhaustive deliberations, the Conference observed:

a. That it was through British colonisation that the IJAW NATION was forcibly put under the Nigerian State

b. That but for the economic interests of the imperialists, the Ijaw ethnic nationality would have evolved as a distinct and separate sovereign nation, enjoying undiluted political, economic, social, and cultural AUTONOMY.

c. That the division of the Southern Protectorate into East and West in 1939 by the British marked the beginning of the balkanisation of a hitherto territorially contiguous and culturally homogeneous Ijaw people into political and administrative units, much to our disadvantage. This trend is continuing in the balkanisation of the Ijaws into six states-Ondo, Edo, Delta, Bayelsa, Rivers and Akwa Ibom States, mostly as minorities who suffer socio-political, economic, cultural and psychological deprivations.

d. That the quality of life of Ijaw people is deteriorating as a result of utter neglect, suppression and marginalisation visited on Ijaws by the alliance of the Nigerian state and transnational oil companies.

e. That the political crisis in Nigeria is mainly about the struggle for the control of oil mineral resources which account for over 80% of GDP, 95 %of national budget and 90% of foreign exchange earnings. From which, 65%, 75% and 70% respectively are derived from within the Ijaw nation. Despite these huge contributions, our reward from the Nigerian State remains avoidable deaths resulting from ecological devastation and military repression.

f. That the unabating damage done to our fragile natural environment and to the health of our people is due in the main to uncontrolled exploration and exploitation of crude oil and natural gas which has led to numerous oil spillages, uncontrolled gas flaring, the opening up of our forests to loggers, indiscriminate canalisation, flooding, land subsidence, coastal erosion, earth tremors etc. Oil and gas are exhaustible resources and the complete lack of concern for ecological rehabilitation, in the light of the Oloibiri experience, is a signal of impending doom for the peoples of Ijawland.

g. That the degradation of the environment of Ijawland by transnational oil companies and the Nigerian State arise mainly because Ijaw people have been robbed of their natural rights to ownership and control of their land and resources through the instrumentality of undemocratic Nigerian State legislations such as the Land Use Decree of 1978, the Petroleum Decrees of 1969 and 1991, the Lands (Title Vesting etc.) Decree No. 52 of 1993 (Osborne Land Decree), the National Inland Waterways Authority Decree No. 13 of 1997 etc.

h. That the principle of Derivation in Revenue Allocation has been consciously and systematically obliterated by successive regimes of the Nigerian state. We note the drastic reduction of the Derivation Principle from 100% (1953), 50% (1960), 45% (1970), 20% (1975) 2% (1982), 1.5% (1984) to 3% (1992 to date), and a rumored 13% in Abacha's 1995 undemocratic and unimplemented Constitution.

i. That the violence in Ijawland and other parts of the Niger Delta area, sometimes manifesting in intra and inter ethnic conflicts are sponsored by the State and transnational oil companies to keep the communities of the Niger Delta area divided, weak and distracted from the causes of their problems.

j. That the recent revelations of the looting of national treasury by the Abacha junta is only a reflection of an existing and continuing trend of stealing by public office holders in the Nigerian state. We remember the over 12 billion dollars Gulf war windfall, which was looted by Babangida and his cohorts We note that over 70% of the billions of dollars being looted by military rulers and their civilian collaborators is derived from our ecologically devastated Ijawland.

Based on the foregoing, we, the youths of Ijawland, hereby make the following resolutions to be known as the Kaiama Declaration:

1. All land and natural resources (including mineral resources) within the Ijaw territory belong to Ijaw communities and are the basis of our survival.

2. We cease to recognise all undemocratic decrees that rob our peoples/communities of the right to ownership and control of our lives and resources, which were enacted without our participation and consent. These include the Land Use Decree and The Petroleum Decree etc.

3. We demand the immediate withdrawal from Ijawland of all military forces of occupation and repression by the Nigerian State. Any oil company that employs the services of the armed forces of the Nigerian State to "protect" its operations will be viewed as an enemy of the Ijaw people. Family members of military personnel stationed in Ijawland should appeal to their people to leave the Ijaw area alone.

4.Ijaw youths in all the communities in all Ijaw clans in the Niger Delta will take steps to implement these resolutions beginning from 30 December 1998, as a step towards reclaiming the control of our lives. We, therefore, demand that all oil companies stop all exploration and exploitation activities in the Ijaw area. We are tired of gas flaring; oil spillages, blowouts and being labelled saboteurs and terrorists. It is a case of preparing the noose for our hanging. We reject this labelling. Hence, we advice all oil companies staff and contractors to withdraw from Ijaw territories by 30 December 1998 pending the resolution of the issue of resource ownership and control in the Ijaw area of the Niger Delta

5. Ijaw youths and Peoples will promote the principle of peaceful coexistence between all Ijaw communities and with our immediate neighbours, despite the provocative and divisive actions of the Nigerian State, transnational oil companies and their contractors. We offer a hand of friendship and comradeship to our neighbors: the Itsekiri, Ilaje, Urhobo Isoko, Edo, Ibibio, Ogoni, Ekpeye, Ikwerre etc. We affirm our commitment to joint struggle with the other ethnic nationalities in the Niger delta area for self-determination.

6. We express our solidarity with all peoples organisations and ethnic nationalities in Nigeria and elsewhere who are struggling for self-determination and justice. In particular we note the struggle of the Oodua Peoples Congress (OPC), the Movement for the Survival of the Ogoni People (Mosop), Egi Women's Movement etc.

7. We extend our hand of solidarity to the Nigerian oil workers (NUPENG and PENGASSAN) and expect that they will see this struggle for freedom as a struggle for humanity

8. We reject the present transition to civil rule programme of the Abubakar regime, as it is not preceded by restructuring of the Nigerian federation. The way forward is a Sovereign National Conference of equally represented ethnic nationalities to discuss the nature of a democratic federation of Nigerian ethic nationalities. Conference noted the violence and killings that characterized the last local government elections in most parts of the Niger Delta. Conference pointed out that these electoral conflicts are a manifestation of the undemocratic and unjust nature of the military transition programme. Conference affirmed therefore, that the military are incapable of enthroning true democracy in Nigeria.

9 We call on all Ijaws to remain true to their Ijawness and to work for the total liberation of our people. You have no other true home but that which is in Ijawland.

10 We agreed to remain within Nigeria but to demand and work for Self Government and resource control for the Ijaw people. Conference approved that the best way for Nigeria is a federation of ethnic nationalities. The federation should be run on the basis equality and social justice.

Finally, Ijaw youths resolve to set up the Ijaw Youth Council (IYC) to coordinate the struggle of Ijaw peoples for self-determination and justice.

Signed for the entire participants by: Felix Tuodolo and Ogoriba, Timi Kaiser-Wilhelm.

== Diepreye Alamieyeseigha on the Kaiama Declaration ==
On 16 November 2000, Bayelsa State Governor, Diepreye Alamieyeseigha supported the declaration and stated that he will "convince the governors of the South-South and the Southern governors to adopt the Kaiama declaration on resource control."
