= Zambesia =

Proposed country in Southern Africa

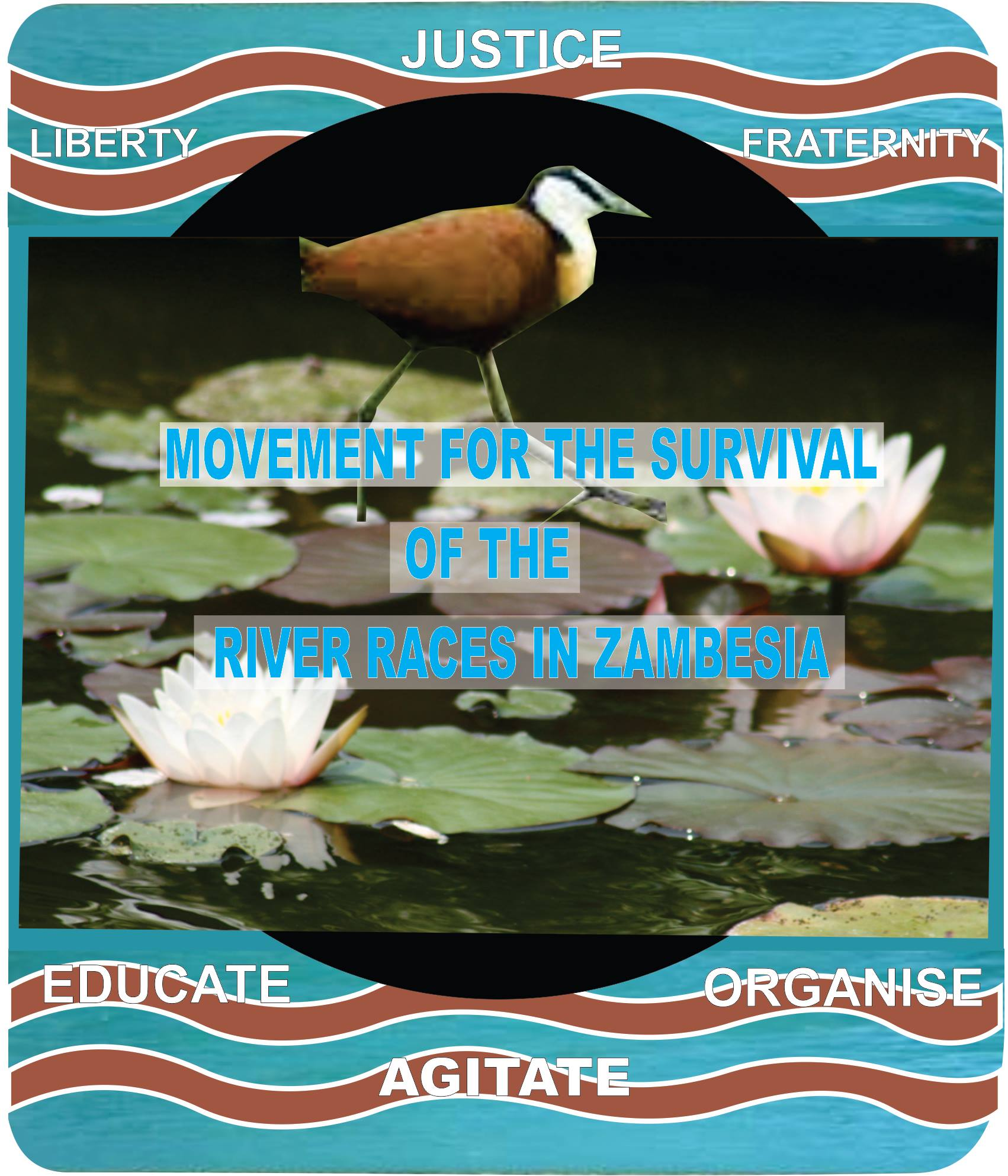
- Flag Coat of arms

- Zambesia as proposed by the Movement for the Survival of the River Races of Zambesia
- Common languages: English
- Demonyms: Zambesi, Zambesian

Zambesia, historically known as Sebitwane country, Makololo country, and Sekeletu country, is a region in southern Africa. The area's history predates the establishment of British and German protectorates in the late 19th century. However, following the colonial divisions and the subsequent independence of neighboring states, the Zambesi peoples found themselves divided among multiple countries, leading to cultural fragmentation and struggles for recognition and self-determination.

== History ==
The region known as Zambesia has a rich and diverse history, with its roots tracing back to ancient cultures and societies that flourished along the Zambezi, Kwando, Linyanti, and Chobe Rivers. It was formerly referred to as Sebitwane country, Makololo country, and Sekeletu country. However, with the advent of colonial powers in the late 1800s, the region underwent significant changes.

== Modern challenges ==
In the present day, Zambesians continue to face a range of challenges that impact their livelihoods, culture, and rights.

=== Lack of indigenous status ===
Zambesians lack legal recognition as indigenous peoples within the broader context of Namibia. While the Namibian Constitution prohibits discrimination based on ethnic or tribal affiliation, there is no specific national legislation addressing the rights of indigenous peoples or minorities. This lack of recognition has implications for their political representation and protection of economic, social, and cultural rights.

=== Isolation and discrimination ===
Geographical isolation and limited infrastructure have led to economic challenges for Zambesians, particularly those residing in the Caprivi Strip. Subsistence farming along the rivers remains a common way of life, yet job opportunities and public investments are limited. As a result, poverty rates remain high, and development is hampered.

=== Business development, land disputes, and environmental degradation ===
Controversies have arisen over land use decisions, such as the approval of a multinational foreign company to lease communal land for a tobacco plantation in Zambesia. This decision has sparked criticism due to concerns over its impact on traditional livelihoods, food security, and environmental degradation. The region's potential in sectors like agriculture and tourism remains largely untapped.

=== Freedom of speech and political participation ===
Zambesians face limitations on their freedom of expression and political engagement. Restrictions on public demonstrations and meetings related to self-determination and political views have led to challenges in expressing their desires for political autonomy and representation.

== Legal cases ==
Zambesia's history includes legal cases of significance. The Caprivi Treason Trial, one of the largest trials in Namibia's history, saw the arrest and subsequent acquittal of numerous individuals associated with the Caprivi Liberation Army. The trial, ongoing in some aspects, has brought attention to issues of justice and compensation for those involved.

== UNPO membership ==
In international forums, the Unrepresented Nations and Peoples Organization (UNPO) serves as a platform for advocating the rights and representation of marginalized communities worldwide. The region of Zambesia finds representation within UNPO through the efforts of the Movement for the Survival of the River Races in Zambesia (MOSURIRAZA), a non-violent membership-based organization led by Coordinator General Ben Siyambango. MOSURIRAZA's dedication to empowering Zambesian voices and raising awareness about the challenges faced by the region aligns with UNPO's mission of amplifying the concerns of unrepresented nations and peoples.

== See also ==
- Makololo
- Indigenous Peoples in Namibia
- Caprivi Strip
