= Isaac Adaka Boro =

Nigerian army officer (1938–1968)

Personal details
- Born: 10 September 1938 Oloibiri, British Nigeria, now Bayelsa, Nigeria
- Died: 9 May 1968 (aged 29) Ogu, Okrika, Rivers State, Nigeria
- Resting place: Ijaw hero's park, Bayelsa
- Citizenship: Nigeria
- Relations: David Boro (Brother)
- Children: Olubunmi Alangierefa Boro; Deborah Waritimi; Esther Boro; Felix Boro
- Parent: Pepple Boro (Father)
- Education: University of Nigeria
- Profession: Political activist Soldier; Police officer Teacher
- Nickname: Boro

Military service
- Allegiance: Nigeria
- Branch/service: Nigerian army
- Years of service: 1967 - 1968
- Rank: Major
- Unit: 3 Marine commando division
- Battles/wars: Nigerian Civil War

Major Isaac Jasper Adaka Boro (10 September 1938 – 9 May 1968) was a Nigerian nationalist and military officer of Ijaw heritage. Born in Oloibiri on 10 September 1938 to Pepple Boro, he is widely regarded as an early advocate for the rights of minority groups in Nigeria.

Boro held multiple roles throughout his life, including student leader, teacher, police officer, activist, and military officer in the Nigerian Army.

In 1966, he established the Niger Delta Volunteer Force, an armed group primarily composed of members of the Ijaw ethnic group, and proclaimed the Niger Delta Republic on 23 February 1966. This declaration led to a conflict with federal forces, lasting twelve days before Boro and his associates were apprehended by Ojukwu led soldiers and later charged with treason. They were later granted amnesty by the federal government under General Yakubu Gowon in May 1967, shortly before the Nigerian Civil War.

Following his release, Boro joined the Nigerian Army and was commissioned as a major. He served on the side of the Federal Government during the Civil War but lost his life under unclear circumstances in 1968 while on active duty near Ogu, close to Okrika, in Rivers State.

Activists in the Niger Delta, such as Ken Saro-Wiwa, Ebikabowei "Boyloaf" Victor-Ben, Mujahid Dokubo-Asari, and others, have often acknowledged Isaac Boro as an influential figure in their advocacy.

== Early life ==
Isaac Adaka Boro was born on September 10, 1938, in the humid creeks of Oloibiri, now located in Ogbia Local Government Area of Bayelsa State. He was the son of Pepple Boro, a school headmaster. In his autobiography, The Twelve-Day Revolution, Boro recounted moving frequently with his family whenever his father was transferred to head a new school. He wrote:

"I am reliably informed that I was born at the zero hours of midnight on 10 September 1938, in the oil town of Oloibiri along humid creeks of the Niger Delta. My father was the headmaster of the only mission school there. Before I was old enough to know my surroundings, I was already in a city called Port Harcourt where my father was again the headmaster of another mission school. This was in the early forties. The next environment where I found myself was in my hometown, Kaiama. My father had been sent there to head a school yet again."

Boro excelled academically, earning his First School Leaving Certificate with distinction and later passing the West African School Certificate Examination at Hussey College, Warri, in 1957.

After completing his secondary education in Warri, Delta State, Boro began working as a teacher before joining the Nigerian Police Force in 1961. He later secured a scholarship from the Eastern Regional Government to study chemistry at the University of Nigeria, Nsukka (UNN).

At UNN, Boro emerged as the President of the Students’ Union Government for the 1964/1965 academic session after two prior attempts. This marked his first prominent leadership role and brought him widespread recognition. True to his middle name, "Adaka," meaning "Lion" in the Ijaw language, Boro was known for his radical and courageous personality. As a student, he challenged the Federal Government in court, seeking to nullify the 1964 general elections. He also introduced campus transportation services, which had been previously unavailable at the university.

Boro closely followed Nigeria's political crises, drawing inspiration from revolutionary leaders like Fidel Castro. Upon leaving UNN in 1965, he moved to Lagos, where he co-founded a political movement called WXYZ with Samuel Owonaru and Nottingham Dick. The group advocated for greater control of the Niger Delta's oil wealth by the Ijaw people.

Boro, who reportedly admired Prime Minister Abubakar Tafawa Balewa, criticized the military coup that led to the Prime Minister's assassination. He expressed disapproval of Major-General Johnson Aguiyi-Ironsi's emergence as Head of State, which he viewed as undermining Nigeria's federal structure and constitution. He described the coup as a direct violation of the principles agreed upon by the country's founding fathers.

In response to these developments, and convinced of the need for change, Boro declared the secession of the Niger Delta from the rest of Nigeria a few weeks after the coup.

== Niger Delta revolt ==
Isaac Adaka Boro established the Niger Delta Volunteer Force (NDVF), composed of young men from various Ijaw clans, who were trained in a militia camp behind his father's compound in Kaiama, Bayelsa State. In his address to supporters, Boro emphasized their mission to highlight the oppression and neglect faced by the Niger Delta region.

On February 23, 1966, shortly after the January military coup and at the age of 27, Boro declared the Niger Delta's secession from Nigeria, naming the new entity the Niger Delta Republic.

In his autobiography, he said;

"Today is a great day, not only in your lives but also in the history of the Niger Delta. Perhaps it will be the most fantastic day in a very long time. This is not because we are going to bring the heavens down but because we are going to demonstrate to the world what and how we feel about oppression. Remember your 70-year-old grandmother who still farms before she eats; also remember your poverty-stricken people; remember, too, your petroleum, which is being pumped out daily from your veins; and then fight for your freedom."

Despite the formidable challenge of confronting the Nigerian Army, Boro and his key allies, including Captains Sam Owonaru, Nottingham Dick, George Amangala, and others, remained steadfast in their resolve.

In his autobiography, Boro expressed a deep commitment to truth and justice, maintaining optimism even when confronted with dire consequences. His declaration was a significant moment in Nigeria's history, marking the first serious challenge to the country's unity. Boro argued that the Niger Delta, a region critical to Nigeria's economic wealth, had suffered from prolonged neglect and underdevelopment.

Leading approximately 150 volunteer fighters, Boro launched a guerrilla campaign against the federal government. For 12 days, the NDVF resisted federal forces before being subdued by the Nigerian Army under Major-General Johnson Aguiyi-Ironsi, with support from Eastern Region Governor Chukwuemeka Ojukwu. Interestingly, Ojukwu would later lead his own secessionist movement by declaring the Republic of Biafra in May 1967.

Following his capture, trial, and conviction for treason, Boro remained unapologetic, famously stating, “There is nothing wrong with Nigeria but the lack of mercy in our activities.”

The political landscape shifted after the July 1966 counter-coup, which brought Lt. Col. Yakubu Gowon to power. As Nigeria approached civil war, Boro's knowledge of the Niger Delta's complex terrain and his ability to mobilize local support became valuable to the federal government. These factors proved crucial in countering the Biafran secessionist movement, which had included parts of the Niger Delta within its territory.

In May 1967, Boro was granted amnesty by the Gowon administration and commissioned as a major in the Nigerian Army. He joined Colonel Benjamin Adekunle's Third Marine Commando Division, commanding a unit of around 1,000 men from Rivers State. Despite limited training, their understanding of the region's terrain and local languages was instrumental during the conflict.

Boro and his unit, known as the "Sea School Boys," became integral to the success of the Third Marine Commando Division. Their familiarity with the riverine areas, ability to adapt to challenging conditions, and swift—though less strategically complex—movements contributed to significant victories in areas such as Opobo, Andoni, Obodo, Opolom, Oranga, and Buguma.

== Death ==
Major Isaac Adaka Boro died under uncertain circumstances in 1968 near Okrika during the Nigerian Civil War at the age of 29. Reflecting on his brother's death, David Boro, Isaac's younger sibling, who was a teenager at the time, explained that Isaac did not consider himself a conventional soldier. David described him as an impassioned freedom fighter seeking quick results, with the intent to leave the army once the war was over. He believed that Isaac's fervor ultimately led to his death.

In his memoir, the 5th and 12th Nigerian President, Olusegun Obasanjo wrote that Isaac Boro was killed by a retreating rebel soldier during a private visit. The uncertainty surrounding his death is said to have affected the morale of the soldiers, contributing to challenges in the war effort.

Major Isaac Adaka Boro was originally buried at Ikoyi Cemetery in Lagos, but in 2013, his remains were exhumed and reburied at the Ijaw Heroes Park in Yenagoa, the capital of Bayelsa State.

== Legacy ==
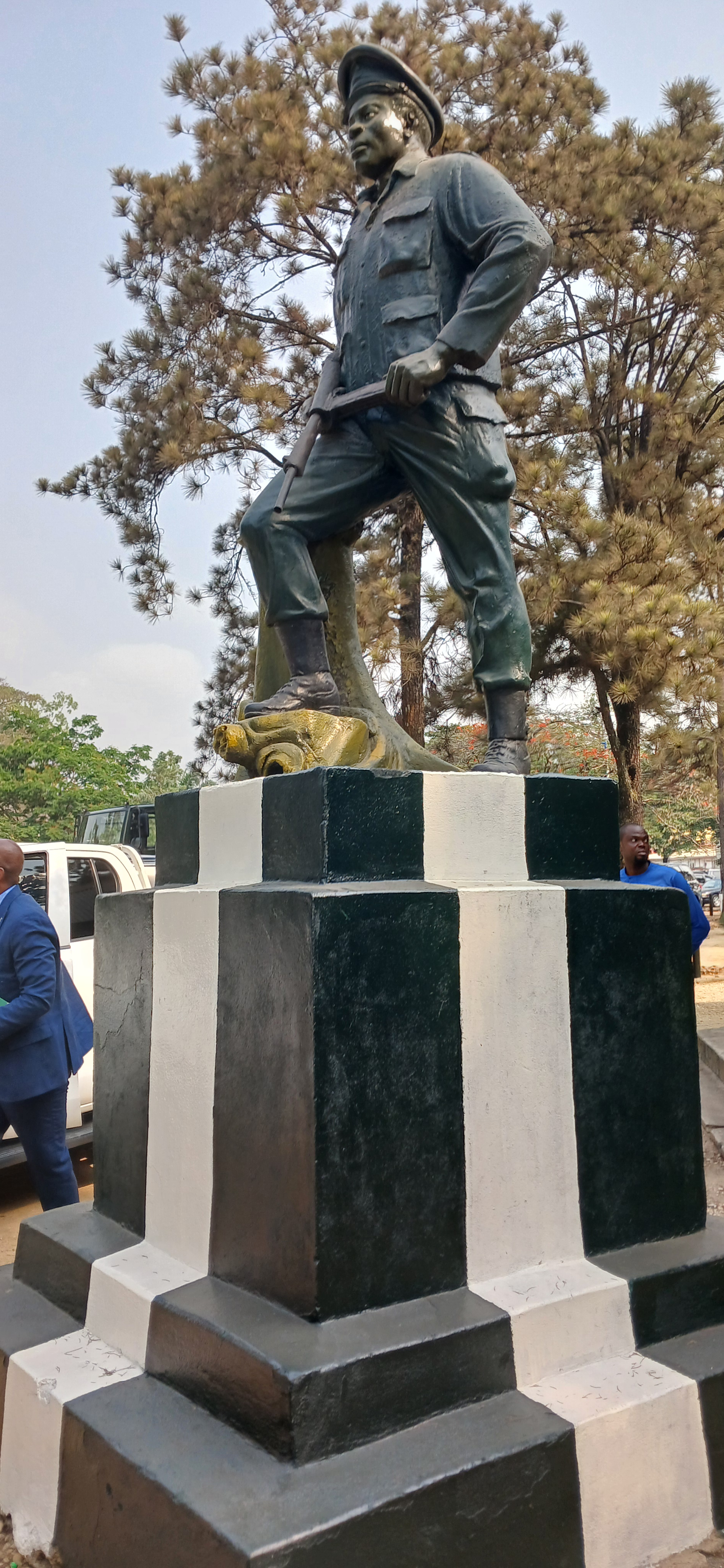
Statue of Isaac Adaka Boro at the park named after him

Isaac Adaka Boro's 12-Day Revolution marked the first armed rebellion against the Federal Republic of Nigeria. He is often recognized as a significant figure who influenced both violent and non-violent activists from the Niger Delta, including Ken Saro-Wiwa.

Boro's actions brought awareness to the challenging conditions faced by the Ijaw people, who, despite living in an oil-rich region, experienced poverty. The Ijaw were often depicted as people "bathing in the ocean but unable to get water in their eyes," reflecting the disparity between the region's resources and its people's living standards.

Captain Sam Owonaru, Major Boro's second in command and the last surviving member of the Niger Delta Volunteer Force, spoke in June 2020 before his death. He noted that the region's struggle stemmed from the lack of control over its resources, a challenge that remains a key issue in the region today.

Although Boro's revolution did not succeed, it played a crucial role in highlighting the need for resource control and drawing attention to the issues in the Niger Delta. His revolt is regarded as the first significant armed opposition to the Federal Republic of Nigeria, and his legacy continues to influence efforts addressing the region's concerns.

== See also ==
- Isaac Boro Park
- Ken Saro-Wiwa
- Ernest Ikoli

== Citations ==
- Oriola, Temitope B. (2016). Criminal Resistance?: The Politics of Kidnapping Oil Workers. Routledge. ISBN 9781317157847.
- Gold, Mondy. (6 October 2025). Isaac Adaka Boro?: The Unfinished Project: The Lion of the Niger Delta Vol 1. United States, Pine Book Writing, 2025. ISBN 9781967828685.
