= Uamsho =

The Association for Islamic Mobilisation and Propagation
- Abbreviation: Uamsho
- Amir: Sheikh Farid Hadi Ahmed
- Deputy Amir: Sheikh Azzan Khalid Hamdan
- General Secretary: Sheikh Abdallah Said Madawa
- Founded: 2001
- Headquarters: Zanzibar
- Ideology: Islamic fundamentalism Pro-Zanzibar independence

UAMSHO, popular shorthand for The Association for Islamic Mobilisation and Propagation, nicknamed The Awakening, is an Islamist separatist group legally registered in Zanzibar. Led by Farid Hadi Ahmed, Uamsho seeks independence for Zanzibar from Tanzania.

== History and formation ==
Uamsho was officially registered as JUMIKI (Jumuiya ya Uamsho na mihadhara ya kiislam in Swahili) in 2001 with the Registration no.149 under the Zanzibar government Society Act Number 6 of 1995 concerning the registration of civil society organization (non governmental organisation). But the name Uamsho has become more popular than its original name.

According to its constitution UAMSHO has been established for the purpose of promoting love, unity and development among Islamic believers; to encourage them in matters of their religion, including the education, culture and Islamic religion to do anything that is good or that focuses on elevating and spreading Islamic religion; protecting and defending the rights of human beings in Islam as well as preserving Muslims with difficulty; protecting and defending silk and Islamic culture not to be undermined, unprotected, and assisting in solving social disasters including conflicts, disasters, and combating various disasters such as Aids, drug abuse and other social disasters as well as Zanzibar has full autonomy rather than remain under the umbrella of the Union of Tanganyika and Zanzibar.

== Riots, incitement to murder and general criticism ==
Zanzibar and Tanzania government has criticized UAMSHO for failing to stick to its purpose as registered and instead has turned into a political group questioning Zanzibar's place in Tanzania. Uamsho has been accused of no longer being a purely religious movement: Uamsho has called for a referendum on Zanzibar's exit from the United Republic of Tanzania.

In April 2012 the governments of Tanzania and Zanzibar intervened and stopped all meetings, demonstrations, gatherings or lectures until further notice. The group continued to conduct lectures claiming to be exercising its freedom of speech. Several clashes between Uamsho members and the field force unit have been reported in the Zanzibar island of Unguja.

On 25 December 2012 the Rev. Ambrose Mkenda was injured as he arrived home in Tomondo, about four miles from Zanzibar City. The incident was linked to Uamsho but no evidence has been found so far.

Criticism mainly comes from the leaders of government of Zanzibar including President Dr. Shein and the Tanzanian Prime Minister Mizengo Pinda. Pinda expressed concern over the activities of Uamsho. He told the National Assembly that the organisation was legally registered as a non-governmental organization in Zanzibar and at the beginning operated well. "Unfortunately the NGO has of late lost direction and is propagating hatred among the people in Zanzibar. Authorities in Zanzibar are dealing with all trouble makers."

On 16 October 2012, Sheikh Farid Hadi Ahmad was reported missing and returned home after four days. He claimed to have been abducted by armed and masked men who identified themselves as police officers. The then Commissioner of Zanzibar Police, Mussa Ali categorically dismissed the claims, saying that police had no idea of the whereabouts of Sheikh Farid. The disappearance caused unrest in Stone Town, paralyzing traffic and business as the missing cleric's supporters rioted. Two people including a police officer were killed and several others were injured.

Seven leaders of the Uamsho, including Sheikh Farid Hadi Ahmed, were arrested on 20 October 2012 and appeared before Mwanakwerekwe District Court in Zanzibar where they were charged with several counts including incitement, causing chaos, and breach of peace and misunderstandings in the Isles. Defence lawyers Salim Tawfik and Abdallah Juma boycotted a court session and withdrew from representing Uamsho, accusing the police and prosecuting officers of acting under unnecessary secrecy. Since 2012 Uamsho leaders have been held in the mainland jailed without charges which is against the Tanzanian constitution and whoever speaks regarding UAMSHO is arrested.

Analysts have said that Uamsho has been gaining popularity following the disenchantment of supporters of Zanzibar's main opposition Civic United Front (CUF) party after its decision to form a government of national unity with the ruling Chama Cha Mapinduzi (CCM) Party.

== See also ==
- Zanzibar acid attack: Uamsho supporters have been suspected of being involved
