= Democratic Party (Tanzania) =

Political party in Tanzania

- Leader: Rev. Christopher Mtikila
- Registered: 7 June 2002
- Ideology: Pro-Zanzibar independence Tanganyikan ultranationalism Ethnic nationalism Christian fundamentalism
- Political position: Far-right
- Religion: Full Salvation Church

The Democratic Party (DP) is a political party in Tanzania. The party was registered on 7 June 2002. The DP is led by Rev. Christopher Mtikila, who is the Reverend of the Full Salvation Church. The DP calls for the dissolution of the Union Government of Tanzania and has openly campaigned for the separation from mainland of the islands of Zanzibar and Pemba from Tanganyika. The DP supports the expulsion of minorities from the mainland.

In elections for the Zanzibar Presidency and House of Representatives on 30 October 2005, DP presidential candidate Abdallah Ali Abdallah won 0.11% of the vote. The party failed to win any seats in concurrent House of Assembly elections.

In elections held on 14 December 2005, Christopher Mtikila placed sixth out of ten candidates, winning 0.27% of the vote. The party failed to win any seats in National Assembly elections held on the same day.

== Incidents involving the Democratic Party (DP) ==
In February 1992, DP leader, Rev. Mtikila was detained for distributing leaflets insulting President Mwinyi and the government over the handling of student unrest in 1990 at the University of Dar es Salaam. (Reuters 21 Feb. 1992) In January 1993, Rev. Mtikila and 4 DP supporters were arrested on charges of sedition, illegal assembly, and inciting violence, after cars belonging to Asians were stoned by DP supporters following a rally in which Rev. Mtikila accused the government of allowing Asians to plunder the country’s wealth. Although Rev. Mtikila and his supporters were released on bail, they were required to surrender their passports and stay in Dar es Salaam under "preventive" detention. (AFP 1 Feb. & 8 Feb. 1993) In September 1993, DP leader, Rev. Mtikila, was arrested for making volatile statements to President Mwinyi. (AFP 15 Sept. 1993) In October 1993 Rev. Mtikila and 3 DP members were arrested for holding an unlawful assembly. (BBC 26 Oct. 1993)

In October 1994 a judge ruled in favor of a petition filed by Rev. Mtikila and determined that the law demanding licensing of political rallies violated the people’s right of association, that independent candidates can contest the first multi-party elections, and that state-run radio must give equal air time to all legalised parties. (AFP 25 Oct. 1994) In February 1995 the government refuted involvement in plans to assassinate Rev. Mtikila upon his return from abroad. (Xinhua 4 Feb. 1995) In March 1995, there was suspicion that Tanzania’s former Minister of Labour and Youth had linked with the DP and Rev. Mtikila after the Minister’s resignation on the grounds that the CCM is a "party of crooks" that is not representative of Tanzanians. In May 1995, a panel of judges rejected Rev. Mtikila’s request to bar Zanzibaris from presidential appointments. (BBC 29 May 1995)

== Election results ==
=== Presidential elections ===
Election	Party candidate	Votes	%	Result
2005	Mchungaji Augustine Mtikila	31,083	0.27%	Lost ✗
2010	Did not participate			
2015	Did not participate			
2020	Philipo John Fumbo	8,283	0.06%	Lost ✗
2025	Abdul Juma Mluya	26,257	0.08%	Lost ✗
