= Tokaleya =

Ethnic group in Zambia and Zimbabwe

The Tokaleya people are indigenous to the area surrounding Mosi oa Tunya in Zambia and Zimbabwe. They comprise two related groups, the Toka (Batoka) and the Leya (Baleya), and they speak dialects of the Tonga language and Lozi (Zambia).

The Tokaleya have a long history in the area. For them the Mosi oa Tunya is a sacred and essential element in their culture. Mosi oa Tunya forms an integral part of their way of life and they have inhabited the area for hundreds of years. The Batoka give their name to the gorges downstream of Mosi oa Tunya.

An example of a Tokaleya village is the Songwe Village, located 5 km downstream from the Mosi oa Tunya and Musokotwane palace that holds significant history of the surrounding regions. Many specialist Botswana wilderness safaris take visitors to a traditional Tokaleya village.
