= Acholi nationalism =

Political ideology of Acholi people

Acholi nationalism is a political ideology and socio-political movement that seeks self-determination, as well as the cultural, economic, and political interests of the Acholi people, an ethnic group primarily residing in northern Uganda and parts of South Sudan. Emerging prominently in the post-colonial period, Acholi nationalism has been shaped by historical grievances, regional marginalization, and the quest for self-determination, autonomy and identity preservation.

== Historical background ==
The Acholi people have a rich history, with their roots traced back to the Luo migration from South Sudan around the 15th century. They established a centralized chieftaincy system and lived in relatively autonomous chiefdoms until the arrival of British colonialists in the late 19th century. British colonial policies, such as indirect rule, disrupted traditional structures and contributed to the marginalization of northern Uganda, setting the stage for future tensions.

== Post-colonial period ==
After Uganda gained independence in 1962, the Acholi, like many other ethnic groups in Uganda, faced numerous challenges. The central government's focus on development in the southern regions of the country led to economic and infrastructural neglect in the north. This disparity fueled a sense of alienation among the Acholi people, fostering the seeds of nationalism. The situation deteriorated further during the regimes of Idi Amin (1971–1979) and Milton Obote (1980–1985). Both leaders engaged in policies and military actions that disproportionately affected the Acholi, exacerbating grievances and leading to violent conflicts. The overthrow of Obote and the rise of Yoweri Museveni in 1986 marked a significant turning point.

== The Lord's Resistance Army (LRA) ==
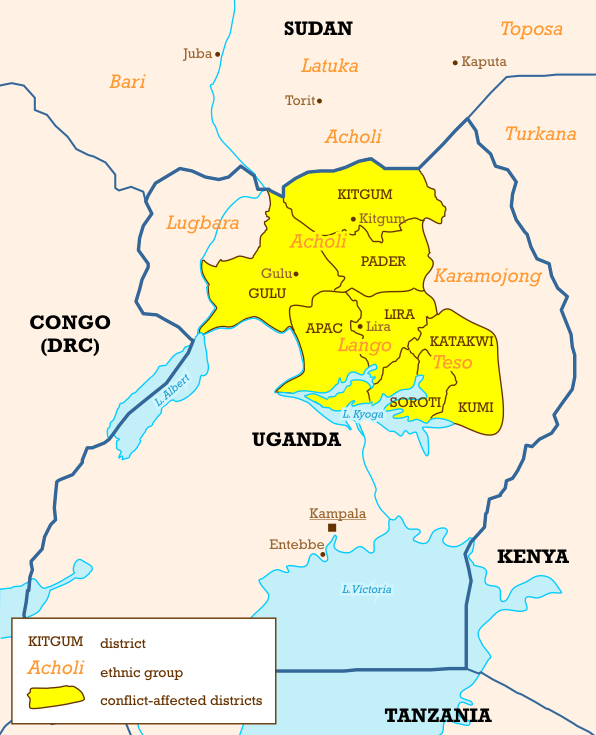
Ugandan districts affected by Lord's Resistance Army activity

A significant chapter in Acholi nationalism is intertwined with the emergence of the Lord's Resistance Army (LRA) in the late 1980s. Led by Joseph Kony, the LRA claimed to fight for the rights of the Acholi people against Museveni's government. However, the group's brutal tactics, including the abduction of children and widespread atrocities, alienated much of the Acholi population and undermined their legitimacy as representatives of Acholi interests. In January 1986, General Tito Okello-Lutwa's junta government in Uganda was overthrown by Museveni and his NRA rebels. Tito and Bazilio Okello, both of the Acholi tribe, fled the country into exile. Shortly after, the NRM began efforts to pacify the northern region, home to various ethnic groups including the Acholi and Lango.

However, the pacification of northern Uganda was executed with significant brutality and unprofessionalism by NRA soldiers and the government. This reckless approach led to resistance in the region, and several rebel groups emerged in defiance of the NRA government. Notable among these were the Uganda People's Army (UPA) in Teso and Lango, the West Nile Bank Frontiers (WNBF) in the West Nile region, the Uganda People's Democratic Army (UPDA), the Holy Spirit Movement, and the LRA in the Acholi region.

In Acholi, groups like the UPDA opposed the Museveni regime due to its overthrow of the government in which they had served. They also resented the NRA's power consolidation tactics, which included mass arrests, torture, killings, cattle raiding, destruction of food crops, and the looting and burning of villages.

While the NRA managed to defeat all the rebel groups except the LRA, this led to a 20-year conflict. At its peak, 90% of the Acholi population was forced into IDP camps, designed as protected villages. These camps caused immense suffering, with a conservative death toll of 1,000 people per week. Conservative estimates suggest that at least 300,000 people died in the conflict, which extended into Sudan, the DR Congo, and the Central African Republic.

== Cultural revival and modern nationalism ==
In recent years, Acholi nationalism has taken on a more cultural and developmental focus. Efforts to revive and promote Acholi culture, language, and traditions have gained momentum. The Acholi cultural institution, Ker Kwaro Acholi, plays a pivotal role in these efforts, advocating for cultural preservation and community cohesion.

Economic development initiatives have also become central to Acholi nationalism. There is a strong emphasis on addressing the long-standing economic disparities between Northern Uganda and the more developed southern regions. Local leaders and organizations strive to attract investment, improve infrastructure, and create opportunities for the Acholi people.

Political representation remains a crucial aspect of Acholi nationalism. The Acholi have sought to increase their influence within the national political landscape of Uganda. Various political leaders from the region have advocated for policies that address the unique challenges faced by the Acholi, aiming to secure a more equitable distribution of resources and political power.

Flag of the Acholi people moved by the MP for Koro, Mr. Latim Baltaza, which was unanimously adopted by the Acholi council.

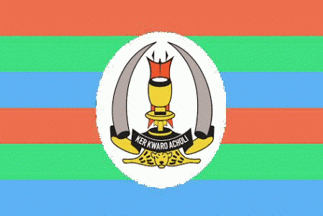
Flag with seal for the Acholi Kingdom (Ker Kwaro Acholi)

== See also ==
- Ugandan nationalism
