= Agʿazi =

Region of the Aksumite Empire in Eastern Tigray and Southern Eritrea

Agʿazi (Ge’ez: አግዓዚ) is the name of a leading tribe of the Aksumite Empire in what consists today of Eastern Tigray and central-south Eritrea.

== History ==
The earliest attestation of this name can be found in the determined nisba-form yg'ḏyn in three pre-Aksumite Royal inscriptions: [rb]h/mlkn/sr'n/yg'ḏyn/mkrb/d'mt/web' 'RBH, the victorious king, he of (the tribe?) YG'Ḏ, mukarrib of D'MT and SB' (RIE 8:1-2); lmn/mlkn/sr'n/yg/ḏyn/mkrb/d'mt/wsb'/bn/rbb 'LMN, the victorious king he of (the tribe?) YG'Ḏ, mukarrib of D'MT and SB', son of RBH' (RIE 5 A:1-2, the same formula in RIE 10:1-5). YG'Ḏ seems to be the name of the leading tribe or royal family settled in the region of Akele Guzai.

In the Greek Monumentum Adulitanum (RIE 277), the author (an Aksumite king of the 2nd-3rd century AD) states: Γάζη έθνος έπολέμηα ("I fought the Gaze-people"). This people's name has been connected with the term Ge'ez. The Sinaiticus and Laurentianus manuscripts (both 11th century) explain in margin: "Gaze means the Aksumites. Until now they are called Agaze". The reconstruction [ag]āzә[yān] in RIE 264 from Zafār (Yemen) (late 5th-early 6th century AD) has been proposed by Müller, but the fragment is too badly damaged to provide any help as to who could be meant by this name.

Another attestation is found in Abraha's Sabaean dam-inscription CIH 541 from Mārib (dated 543/548 AD), where he calls himself mlkn gzyn ("The Ag'azyan King").

A connection between agāzī and the people Agēzāt, mentioned in two of Ezana's inscriptions seems questionable.

An Ethiopian regnal list from 1922 claimed that an "Ag'azyan" dynasty had reigned from 1985 to 982 BC. The dynasty was allegedly founded by Sheba, son of the Biblical figure Joktan, and the last ruler of this line was Makeda, the Biblical queen of Sheba. This regnal list, however, is not considered historically accurate and has been treated by historians as little more than a vague notion of historical tradition in Northeast Africa.
