= Monday Obolo =

Nigerian politician

Monday Obolo is a Nigerian politician. He served as the State Representatives representing Southern Ijaw II constituency at the 6th Bayelsa State House of Assembly.
