= Kolokuma/Opokuma =

Kolokuma/Opokuma KOLGA
- LGA and town
- Interactive map of Kolokuma/Opokuma
- Location in Nigeria
- Coordinates: 5°08′N 6°18′E
- Country: Nigeria
- State: Bayelsa State
- Headquarters: Kaiama

Government
  - Local Government Chairman: Tariye Lelei (PDP)

Area
  - Total: 361 km^{2} (139 sq mi)

Population (2024 est)
  - Total: 299,453
  - Density: 830/km^{2} (2,150/sq mi)
- Time zone: UTC+1 (WAT)
- 3-digit postal code prefix: 560
- ISO 3166 code: NG.BY.KO

Kolokuma/Opokuma is a Local Government Area of Bayelsa State, Nigeria. Its headquarters are in the town of Kaiama. Much of the area of the LGA is occupied by the Bayelsa National Forest.

It has an area of 361 km^{2} and an estimated population of 299,453 as at 2024.

The postal code of the area is 560.

== Climate/Geography ==
The entire area of Kolokuma Opokuma LGA is 361 square kilometres or 139 square miles, with an average temperature of 26 degrees Celsius or 80 degrees Fahrenheit. The Bayelsa National Forest is located in this densely forested region. The Efi lake is one of the many rivers and lakes that flow through the region.
