= Abraham Ingobere =

Speaker of the 6th and 7th Bayelsa State House of Assembly

Abraham Ingobere (born 1974) is a Nigerian politician currently serving as the 7th speaker of the Bayelsa State House of Assembly since 6 June 2023. Ingobere is a member of the Peoples Democratic Party (PDP) representing Brass Constituency 3 in the state house of assembly. A 4th term member of the assembly, he served as the 6th speaker of the house and was re-elected speaker of the 7th assembly unchallenged on 6 June 2023. He was nominated for the speakership position by, Monday Bubou a member of the PDP representing Southern Ijaw Constituency 2 and seconded by Bernard Kenebai also of the PDP representing Sagbama Constituency 2 in the state assembly.

Ingobere's 2023 election to the Brass Constituency 3 seat was challenged in the state assembly election tribunal by Dordor Ibinabo of the Action Democratic Party. The tribunal struck out the petition against Ingobere after the petitioner Dordor Ibinabo withdrew the petition on personal grounds.
