= List of armed conflicts in 2017 =

Locations of conflicts worldwide in 2017 Major wars, 10,000+ deaths in 2017 Wars, 1,000–9,999 deaths in 2017 Minor conflicts, 100–999 deaths in 2017 Skirmishes and clashes, fewer than 100 deaths in 2017 ← 2016 2018 →

The following is a list of armed conflicts with victims in 2017.

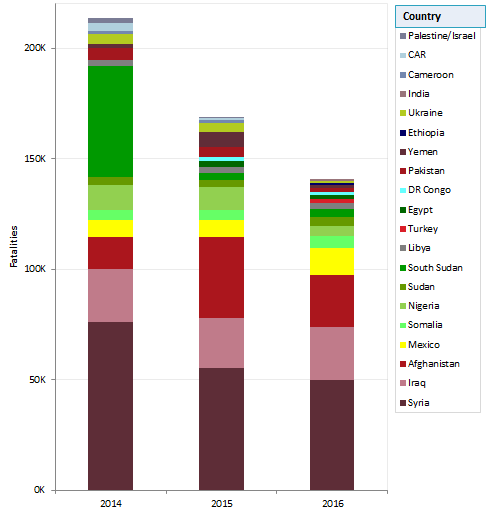
Conflict-related fatalities in the world's 15 deadliest countries in 2014, 2015 and 2016.

== List guidelines ==
Listed are the armed conflicts having done globally at least 100 victims and at least 1 victim during the year 2017.

== 10,000+ deaths in 2017 ==
Conflicts in the following list have caused at least 10,000 direct violent deaths in 2017.

Start of conflict	Conflict	Continent	Location	Fatalities in 2017
1978	War in Afghanistan: Current phase	Asia	Afghanistan	23,065 (Note: See)
2003	Iraq conflict: Iraqi Civil War	Asia	Iraq	13,187
2006	Mexican drug war	North America	Mexico	14,771 (Note: 55,691 minus 40,920 at the end of 2016)-31,174
2011	Syrian Civil War	Asia	Syria	39,000

== 1,000–9,999 deaths in 2017 ==
Conflicts in the following list have caused at least 1,000 and fewer than 10,000 direct violent deaths in 2017.
Conflicts causing at least 1,000 deaths in one calendar year are considered wars by the Uppsala Conflict Data Program.

Start of conflict	Conflict	Continent	Location	Fatalities in 2017
1948	Internal conflict in Myanmar: Northern Rakhine State clashes	Asia	Myanmar	6,700+
1969	Moro conflict	Asia	Philippines	1,384
1973	Oromo conflict	Africa	Ethiopia	1,011
1991	Somali Civil War: War in Somalia	Africa	Somalia; Kenya	5,154 (Note: 4,969 in Somalia and 185 in Kenya)
1998	Communal conflicts in Nigeria	Africa	Nigeria	1,097
2002	Insurgency in the Maghreb: Northern Mali conflict; Libyan Civil War (2014–present)	Africa	Algeria; Burkina Faso; Libya; Mali; Niger; Tunisia	2,835 (Note: 129 in Algeria, 93 in Burkina Faso, 1564 in Libya, 926 in Mali, 101 in Niger, 32 in Tunisia)
2003	War in Darfur	Africa	Sudan	1,109
2009	Boko Haram insurgency	Africa	Nigeria; Cameroon; Niger; Chad	3,110 (Note: 2,335 in Nigeria, 404 in Cameroon, 225 in Chad, 145 in Niger)
2011	Libyan Crisis: Libyan Civil War (2014–present)	Africa	Libya	1,564
2011	Yemeni Crisis: Yemeni Civil War (2015–present)	Asia	Yemen; Saudi Arabia	1,438 (Note: 1,319 in Yemen and 119 in Saudi Arabia)
2011	Sinai insurgency	Africa	Egypt	1,342
2011	South Kordofan conflict	Africa	Sudan	1,225
2011	Ethnic violence in South Sudan: South Sudanese Civil War	Africa	South Sudan; Ethiopia	3,646 (Note: 3,528 in South Sudan and 118 in Ethiopia)
2012	Central African Republic conflict	Africa	Central African Republic	1,723

== 100–999 deaths in 2017 ==
Conflicts in the following list have caused at least 100 and fewer than 1,000 direct violent deaths in 2017.

Start of conflict	Conflict	Continent	Location	Fatalities in 2017
1947	Kashmir conflict (Indo-Pakistani Wars): 2016–17 Kashmir unrest; India–Pakistan military confrontation (2016–present)	Asia	India; Pakistan	358
2016	Oromia-Somali clashes	Africa	Oromia; Somalia; Tigray; Ethiopia	+600
2017	2017 Brazil prison riots 2017 Military Police of Espírito Santo strike	South America	Brazil; Paraguay	312
1948	Balochistan conflict	Asia	Pakistan; Iran	353 (Note: 343 in Pakistan, 10 in Iran)
1963	Insurgency in Northeast India	Asia	India	103
1967	Naxalite–Maoist insurgency	Asia	India	333
1984	Kurdish–Turkish conflict: Kurdish–Turkish conflict (2015–present)	Asia	Turkey; Iraq	740 (Note: 694 in Turkey and 46 in Iraq)
1989	Sectarianism in Pakistan	Asia	Pakistan	231
1996	Allied Democratic Forces insurgency	Africa	Democratic Republic of the Congo	221
2004	Kivu conflict: Allied Democratic Forces insurgency	Africa	Democratic Republic of the Congo	848
2004	War in North-West Pakistan	Asia	Pakistan	514
2009	Insurgency in the North Caucasus	Europe	Russia	119 (Note: See)
2009	Sudanese nomadic conflicts	Africa	Sudan	116
2011	Syrian Civil War spillover in Lebanon	Asia	Lebanon	104+ (Note: See)
2012	Northern Mali conflict	Africa	Mali	926
2013	Insurgency in Egypt	Africa	Egypt	164
2013	Batwa-Luba clashes	Africa	Democratic Republic of the Congo	154
2014	War in Donbas	Europe	Ukraine	288+
2015	Burundian unrest	Africa	Burundi	177
2016	Kamwina Nsapu rebellion	Africa	Democratic Republic of the Congo; Angola	566+ (Note: 565 in DRC, 1 in Angola)

== Fewer than 100 deaths in 2017 ==
Conflicts in the following list have caused at least 1 and fewer than 100 direct violent deaths in 2017.

Start of conflict	Conflict	Continent	Location	Fatalities in 2017
1922	Arab separatism in Khuzestan: ASMLA insurgency	Asia	Iran	3
1946	Kurdish separatism in Iran	Asia	Iran	20
2005	Insurgency in Paraguay	South America	Paraguay	2
1960	South Thailand insurgency	Asia	Thailand	44
1963	West Papua conflict	Asia	Indonesia	3
1965	Israeli–Palestinian conflict	Asia	Palestine; Israel	89
1964	Colombian conflict	South America	Colombia	78
1969	Communist rebellion in the Philippines	Asia	Philippines	45
1975	Cabinda War	Africa	Angola	53
1980	Internal conflict in Peru	South America	Peru	11
1987	LRA insurgency	Africa	Democratic Republic of the Congo; Central African Republic	70 (Note: 36 in DRC, 34 in CAR)
1988	Nagorno-Karabakh conflict	Asia	Armenia; Azerbaijan; Artsakh	27 (Note: See)
1989	Xinjiang conflict	Asia	China	11 (Note: See)
1989	Internal conflict in Bangladesh	Asia	Bangladesh	80
1995	Eritrean–Ethiopian border conflict: Second Afar insurgency	Africa	Ethiopia	79
1995	Ogaden insurgency	Africa	Ethiopia	27
1999	Ituri conflict	Africa	Democratic Republic of the Congo	32
2004	Conflict in the Niger Delta: 2016 Niger Delta conflict	Africa	Nigeria	3
2013	RENAMO insurgency	Africa	Mozambique	50
1990	DHKP/C insurgency in Turkey	Asia	Turkey	3
2015	ISIL insurgency in Tunisia	Africa	Tunisia	4
2015	Turkey–ISIL conflict	Asia	Turkey	46
2016	Pool War	Africa	Republic of the Congo	33

== See also ==
- Lists of wars in World (by date, region, type of conflict)
  - Lists of wars and conflict by region
    - Lists of battles (Orders)
  - List of terrorist incidents
    - List of active rebel groups
    - List of designated terrorist organizations
  - List of number of conflicts per year
    - List of most lethal battles in world history
- Africa:
  - List of conflicts in Africa (Military history of Africa)
    - List of modern conflicts in North Africa (Maghreb)
    - Conflicts in the Horn of Africa (East region)
- Americas:
  - List of conflicts in North America
    - List of wars involving the United States
  - List of conflicts in Central America
  - List of conflicts in South America
- Asia:
  - List of conflicts in Asia
  - List of conflicts in the Near East
  - List of conflicts in the Middle East
    - List of modern conflicts in the Middle East
- Europe:
  - List of conflicts in Europe
    - Post-Cold War European conflicts
- Others :
  - List of wars extended by diplomatic irregularity
  - Uppsala Conflict Data Program
  - Failed State
- Ongoing conflicts in World:
  - List of ongoing armed conflicts
  - List of wars 2011–present
    - Ongoing military conflicts
    - Maps of ongoing conflicts
