= List of armed conflicts in 2016 =

Locations of conflicts worldwide in 2016 Major wars, 10,000+ deaths in 2016 Wars, 1,000–9,999 deaths in 2016 Minor conflicts, 100–999 deaths in 2016 Skirmishes and clashes, fewer than 100 deaths in 2016 ← 2015 2017 →

The following is a list of armed conflicts with victims in 2016.

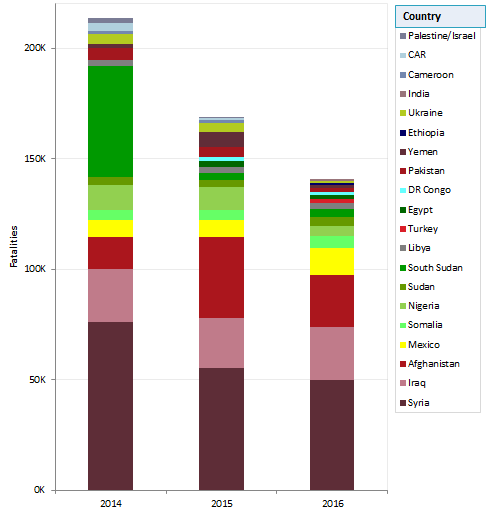
Conflict-related fatalities in the world's 15 deadliest countries in 2014, 2015 and 2016.

The Heidelberg Institute for International Conflict Research estimated that there were 226 politically motivated armed conflicts (of which 38 estimated as highly violent: 18 full-scale wars, 20 limited wars) worldwide during 2016.

== List guidelines ==
Listed are the armed conflicts having done globally at least 100 victims and at least 1 victim during the year 2016.

== 10,000+ deaths in 2016 ==
Conflicts in the following list have caused at least 10,000 direct violent deaths in 2016.

Start of conflict	Conflict	Continent	Location	Fatalities in 2016
1978	War in Afghanistan: War in Afghanistan (2001–2021)	Asia	Afghanistan	23,539+
2003	Iraqi conflict: Iraqi Civil War (2014–2017)	Asia	Iraq	23,898+
2006	Mexican drug war	North America	Mexico	12,224
2011	Syrian Civil War	Asia	Syria	64,126

== 1,000–9,999 deaths in 2016 ==
Conflicts in the following list have caused at least 1,000 and fewer than 10,000 direct violent deaths in 2016.
Conflicts causing at least 1,000 deaths in one calendar year are considered wars by the Uppsala Conflict Data Program.

Start of conflict	Conflict	Continent	Location	Fatalities in 2016
1984	Kurdish–Turkish conflict: Kurdish–Turkish conflict (2015–present)	Asia	Turkey; Iraq; Syria	1,905 (Note: 1,853 in Turkey and 52 in Iraq during the whole of 2016)
1991	Somali Civil War: War in Somalia	Africa	Somalia; Kenya	5,701 (Note: 5,575 in Somalia and 126 in Kenya)
1998	Communal conflicts in Nigeria	Africa	Nigeria	1,407
2003	War in Darfur	Africa	Sudan	1,936
2009	Boko Haram insurgency	Africa	Nigeria; Cameroon; Niger; Chad	3,523 (Note: 2,805 in Nigeria, 392 in Cameroon, 306 in Niger, 20 in Chad)
2011	Libyan Crisis: Libyan Civil War	Africa	Libya	2,865
2011	Yemeni Crisis: Yemeni Civil War (2015–present)	Asia	Yemen; Saudi Arabia	1,500 (Note: 1,375 in Yemen and 125 in Saudi Arabia)
2011	Sinai insurgency	Africa	Egypt	1,578
2011	South Kordofan conflict	Africa	Sudan	1,489
2011	Ethnic violence in South Sudan: South Sudanese Civil War	Africa	South Sudan; Ethiopia	4,037 (Note: 3,544 in South Sudan and 493 in Ethiopia)

== 100–999 deaths in 2016 ==
Conflicts in the following list have caused at least 100 and fewer than 1,000 direct violent deaths in 2016.

Start of conflict	Conflict	Continent	Location	Fatalities in 2016
1947	Kashmir conflict: 2016 Kashmir unrest	Asia	India; Pakistan	289
1948	Balochistan conflict	Asia	Pakistan; Iran	633
1948	Internal conflict in Myanmar	Asia	Myanmar	228
1960	South Thailand insurgency	Asia	Thailand	116
1963	Insurgency in Northeast India	Asia	India	160
1964	Israeli–Palestinian conflict	Asia	Palestine; Israel	120
1964	Colombian conflict	South America	Colombia	156
2016	Oromia-Somali clashes	Africa	Ethiopia	+130
1967	Naxalite–Maoist insurgency	Asia	India	430
1969	Moro conflict	Asia	Philippines	439+
1988	Nagorno-Karabakh conflict: 2016 Armenian–Azerbaijani clashes	Asia	Azerbaijan	189-369 (Note: See)
1989	Sectarianism in Pakistan	Asia	Pakistan	137
1989	Internal conflict in Bangladesh	Asia	Bangladesh	139
1992	Oromo conflict	Africa	Ethiopia	393
1995	Ogaden insurgency	Africa	Ethiopia	156
1996	Allied Democratic Forces insurgency	Africa	Democratic Republic of the Congo	428
2002	Insurgency in the Maghreb	Africa	Algeria; Tunisia; Burkina Faso; Niger	260 (Note: 128 in Algeria, 59 in Burkina Faso, 37 in Tunisia, 36 in Niger)
2004	Kivu conflict	Africa	Democratic Republic of the Congo; Burundi	607
2004	War in North-West Pakistan	Asia	Pakistan	643
2009	Sudanese nomadic conflicts	Africa	Sudan	459
2009	Insurgency in the North Caucasus	Europe	Russia	202
2012	Central African Republic conflict	Africa	Central African Republic	623
2012	Northern Mali conflict	Africa	Mali	303
2013	Insurgency in Egypt	Africa	Egypt	129
2013	RENAMO insurgency	Africa	Mozambique	108
2013	Batwa-Luba clashes	Africa	Democratic Republic of the Congo	108
2014	War in Donbass	Europe	Ukraine	902
2015	Burundian unrest	Africa	Burundi	461
2015	Turkey–ISIL conflict	Asia	Turkey	160 (Note: See)
2016	Kamwina Nsapu rebellion	Africa	Democratic Republic of the Congo	160
2016	2016 Kasese clashes	Africa	Uganda	162

== Fewer than 100 deaths in 2016 ==
Conflicts in the following list have caused at least 1 and fewer than 100 direct violent deaths in 2016.

Start of conflict	Conflict	Continent	Location	Fatalities in 2016
1922	Arab separatism in Khuzestan: ASMLA insurgency	Asia	Iran	4
1999	Internal conflicit in Bangladesh	Asia	Bangladesh	39
2005	Insurgency in Paraguay	South America	Paraguay	11
1990	DHKP/C insurgency in Turkey	Asia	Turkey	4
1946	Kurdish separatism in Iran	Asia	Iran	74-149+ (Note: See)
1963	West Papua conflict	Asia	Indonesia	4
1969	Communist rebellion in the Philippines	Asia	Philippines	99
1975	Cabinda War	Africa	Angola	84
1980	Internal conflict in Peru	South America	Peru	10
1982	Casamance conflict	Africa	Senegal	10
1987	LRA insurgency	Africa	Democratic Republic of the Congo; Central African Republic; South Sudan; Sudan	39 (Note: 19 in CAR, 13 in DRC, 7 in Sudan)
1989	Xinjiang conflict	Asia	China	10 (Note: See)
1995	Eritrean–Ethiopian border conflict: Second Afar insurgency	Africa	Ethiopia; Eritrea	90 (Note: 72 in Ethiopia, 18 in Eritrea)
1999	Ituri conflict	Africa	Democratic Republic of the Congo	83
2004	Conflict in the Niger Delta: 2016 Niger Delta conflict	Africa	Nigeria	34
2011	Syrian Civil War spillover in Lebanon	Asia	Lebanon	24 (Note: See)
2015	ISIL insurgency in Tunisia	Africa	Tunisia	82
2016	Pool War	Africa	Republic of the Congo	82

== See also ==
- Lists of wars in World (by date, region, type of conflict)
  - Lists of wars and conflict by region
    - Lists of battles (Orders)
  - List of terrorist incidents
    - List of active rebel groups
    - List of designated terrorist organizations
  - List of number of conflicts per year
    - List of most lethal battles in world history
- Africa:
  - List of conflicts in Africa (Military history of Africa)
    - List of modern conflicts in North Africa (Maghreb)
    - Conflicts in the Horn of Africa (East region)
- Americas:
  - List of conflicts in North America
    - List of wars involving the United States
  - List of conflicts in Central America
  - List of conflicts in South America
- Asia:
  - List of conflicts in Asia
  - List of conflicts in the Near East
  - List of conflicts in the Middle East
    - List of modern conflicts in the Middle East
- Europe:
  - List of conflicts in Europe
    - Post-Cold War European conflicts
- Others :
  - List of wars extended by diplomatic irregularity
  - Uppsala Conflict Data Program
  - Failed State
- Ongoing conflicts in World:
  - List of ongoing armed conflicts
  - List of wars 2011–present
    - Ongoing military conflicts
    - Maps of ongoing conflicts
