= List of armed conflicts in 2015 =

The following is a list of armed conflicts with victims in 2015.

The Heidelberg Institute for International Conflict Research estimated that there were 223 politically motivated armed conflicts (of which 43 estimated as highly violent: 19 full-scale wars, 24 limited wars) worldwide during 2015.

Locations of conflicts worldwide in 2015 Major wars, 10,000+ deaths in 2015 Wars, 1,000–9,999 deaths in 2015 Minor conflicts, 100–999 deaths in 2015 Skirmishes and clashes, fewer than 100 deaths in 2015 ← 2014 2016 →

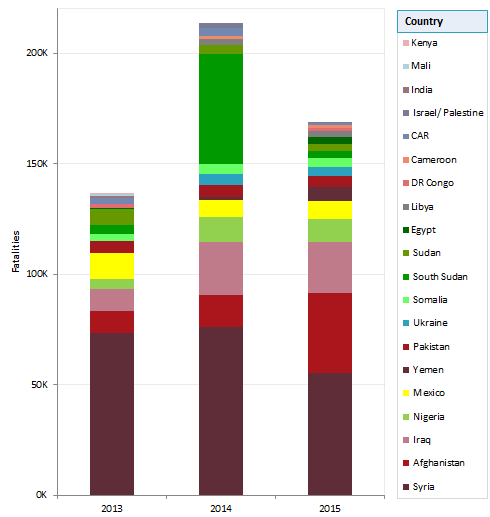
Conflict-related fatalities in the world's 15 deadliest countries in 2013, 2014 and 2015.

== List guidelines ==
This list is an archive of armed conflicts having done globally at least 100 victims and at least 1 victim during the year 2015.

== 10,000+ deaths in 2015 ==
Start of conflict	Conflict	Continent	Location	Fatalities in 2015
1978	War in Afghanistan: War in Afghanistan (2001–2021)	Asia	Afghanistan	15,000–36,345 (Note: See)
2003	Iraqi conflict: Iraqi Civil War (2014–2017)	Asia	Iraq	22,736
2009	Boko Haram insurgency	Africa	Nigeria; Cameroon; Niger; Chad	11,778
2011	Syrian Civil War	Asia	Syria	85,527

== 1,000–9,999 deaths in 2015 ==
Start of conflict	Conflict	Continent	Location	Fatalities in 2015
1984	Kurdish–Turkish conflict: Kurdish–Turkish conflict (2015–present)	Asia	Turkey; Syria; Iraq	1,900–3,423 (Note: 3,100 PKK and 200 Turkish security forces killed (Turkish claim) 220 PKK and 1,557 Turkish security forces killed (PKK claim) 665 people, including 123 civilians, killed in Turkey (ICG tally, July–December 2015))
1991	Somali Civil War: War in Somalia	Africa	Somalia; Kenya	4,365
2004	War in North-West Pakistan	Asia	Pakistan	2,150
2006	Mexican drug war	North America	Mexico	8,122
2011	Libyan Crisis: Libyan Civil War	Africa	Libya	2,706
2011	Yemeni Crisis: Yemeni Civil War (2015–present)	Asia	Yemen; Saudi Arabia	~6,425
2011	Sinai insurgency	Africa	Egypt	2,560
2011	South Kordofan conflict	Africa	Sudan	1,242
2011	Ethnic violence in South Sudan: South Sudanese Civil War	Africa	South Sudan; Ethiopia	3,152
2014	War in Donbass	Europe	Ukraine	4,327

== 100–999 deaths in 2015 ==
Start of conflict	Conflict	Continent	Location	Fatalities in 2015
1947	Kashmir conflict: 2016 Kashmir unrest	Asia	India; Pakistan	184
1948	Balochistan conflict	Asia	Pakistan; Iran	635
1948	Internal conflict in Myanmar	Asia	Myanmar	881
1960	South Thailand insurgency	Asia	Thailand	246
1963	Insurgency in Northeast India	Asia	India	273
1964	Israeli–Palestinian conflict	Asia	Israel; Palestine	190
1964	Colombian conflict	South America	Colombia	410
1967	Naxalite–Maoist insurgency	Asia	India	251
1969	Communist rebellion in the Philippines	Asia	Philippines	190
1969	Moro conflict	Asia	Philippines	311
1989	Sectarianism in Pakistan	Asia	Pakistan	276
1989	Xinjiang conflict	Asia	China	197 (Note: See)
1992	Oromo conflict	Africa	Ethiopia	103
1995	Ogaden insurgency	Africa	Ethiopia	299-499+ (Note: UNPO. "In the few days between 26 May 2015 and today, hundreds of people were killed and whole villages were burned near the Shilaabo district in Ogaden, alongside the border with Somalia. The heinous acts were perpetrated by the Liyu Police,")
1996	Allied Democratic Forces insurgency	Africa	Democratic Republic of the Congo	391
1998	Communal conflicts in Nigeria	Africa	Nigeria	846
2002	Insurgency in the Maghreb	Africa	Algeria; Tunisia	271 (Note: See)
2003	War in Darfur	Africa	Sudan	994
2004	Kivu conflict	Africa	Democratic Republic of the Congo; Burundi	790
2009	Sudanese nomadic conflicts	Africa	Sudan	926
2009	Insurgency in the North Caucasus	Europe	Russia	209
2012	Central African Republic conflict	Africa	Central African Republic	475
2012	Northern Mali conflict	Africa	Mali	414 (Note: See)
2013	Insurgency in Egypt	Africa	Egypt	284
2015	Burundian unrest	Africa	Burundi	551 (Note: See)
2015	Turkey–ISIL conflict	Asia	Turkey	140

== Fewer than 100 deaths in 2015 ==
Start of conflict	Conflict	Continent	Location	Fatalities in 2015
1990	DHKP/C insurgency in Turkey	Asia	Turkey	5
1922	Arab separatism in Khuzestan: ASMLA insurgency	Asia	Iran	6+
1946	Kurdish separatism in Iran	Asia	Iran	24–58+ (Note: See)
1963	West Papua conflict	Asia	Indonesia	9 (Note: See)
1975	Cabinda War	Africa	Angola	1
1980	Internal conflict in Peru	South America	Peru	7
1987	LRA insurgency	Africa	Democratic Republic of the Congo; Central African Republic; South Sudan; Sudan	55
1988	Nagorno-Karabakh conflict	Asia	Armenia; Azerbaijan	81
1989	Internal conflict in Bangladesh	Asia	Bangladesh	73
1995	Eritrean–Ethiopian border conflict: Second Afar insurgency	Africa	Eritrea; Ethiopia	91
1999	Ituri conflict	Africa	Democratic Republic of the Congo	89 (Note: See)
2004	Conflict in the Niger Delta	Africa	Nigeria	3
2011	Syrian Civil War spillover in Lebanon: Bab al-Tabbaneh–Jabal Mohsen conflict	Asia	Lebanon	91+ (Note: See)
2013	RENAMO insurgency	Africa	Mozambique	57 (Note: See)
2015	ISIL insurgency in Tunisia	Africa	Tunisia	77

== See also ==
- Lists of wars in World (by date, region, type of conflict)
  - Lists of wars and conflict by region
    - Lists of battles (Orders)
  - List of terrorist incidents
    - List of active rebel groups
    - List of designated terrorist organizations
  - List of number of conflicts per year
    - List of most lethal battles in world history
- Africa:
  - List of conflicts in Africa (Military history of Africa)
    - List of modern conflicts in North Africa (Maghreb)
    - Conflicts in the Horn of Africa (East region)
- Americas:
  - List of conflicts in North America
    - List of wars involving the United States
  - List of conflicts in Central America
  - List of conflicts in South America
- Asia:
  - List of conflicts in Asia
  - List of conflicts in the Near East
  - List of conflicts in the Middle East
    - List of modern conflicts in the Middle East
- Europe:
  - List of conflicts in Europe
    - Post-Cold War European conflicts
- Others :
  - List of wars extended by diplomatic irregularity
  - Uppsala Conflict Data Program
  - Failed State
- Ongoing conflicts in World:
  - List of ongoing armed conflicts
  - List of wars 2011–present
    - Ongoing military conflicts
    - Maps of ongoing conflicts
