= List of armed conflicts in 2018 =

Locations of conflicts worldwide in 2018

The following is a list of armed conflicts with victims in 2018.

== List guidelines ==
Listed are the armed conflicts having done globally at least 100 victims and at least 1 victim during the year 2018.

== 10,000+ deaths in 2018 ==
Conflicts in the following list have caused at least 10,000 direct violent deaths in 2018.

Start of conflict	Conflict	Continent	Location	Fatalities in 2018
1978	War in Afghanistan: Current phase	Asia	Afghanistan	35,941
2006	Mexican drug war	North America	Mexico	27,765
2011	Syrian Civil War	Asia	Syria	19,799-23,000
2011	Yemeni Crisis: Yemeni Civil War (2015–present); Al-Qaeda insurgency in Yemen; South Yemen insurgency; Saudi–Yemeni border conflict (2015–present)	Asia	Yemen; Saudi Arabia	25,705 (Note: 22,201 in Yemen, 3,504 in Saudi Arabia)

== 1,000–9,999 deaths in 2018 ==
Conflicts in the following list have caused at least 1,000 and fewer than 10,000 direct violent deaths in 2018.
Conflicts causing at least 1,000 deaths in one calendar year are considered wars by the Uppsala Conflict Data Program.

Start of conflict	Conflict	Continent	Location	Fatalities in 2018
1991	Somali Civil War: Current phase	Africa	Somalia; Kenya	3,952 (Note: 3,862 in Somalia and 90 in Kenya)
1998	Communal conflicts in Nigeria	Africa	Nigeria	3,020
2003	Iraq conflict: Iraqi insurgency (2017–present)	Asia	Iraq	4,861
2009	Boko Haram insurgency	Africa	Nigeria; Cameroon; Niger; Chad	2,213 (Note: 1,830 in Nigeria, 293 in Cameroon, 49 in Niger, 41 in Chad)
2011	Ethnic violence in South Sudan: South Sudanese Civil War	Africa	South Sudan	1,166
2012	Northern Mali conflict	Africa	Mali	1,285

== 100–999 deaths in 2018 ==
Conflicts in the following list have caused at least 100 and fewer than 1,000 direct violent deaths in 2018.

Start of conflict	Conflict	Continent	Location	Fatalities in 2018
1947	Kashmir conflict (Indo-Pakistani Wars): India–Pakistan military confrontation (2016–present)	Asia	India; Pakistan	548 (Note: 502 in India, 46 in Pakistan)
1948	Insurgency in Balochistan: Sistan and Baluchestan insurgency	Asia	Pakistan; Iran	416 (Note: 388 in Pakistan, 28 in Iran)
1948	Internal conflict in Myanmar: Kachin conflict; Karen conflict; Rohingya conflict	Asia	Myanmar	171
1964	Colombian conflict	South America	Colombia; Venezuela	709 (Note: See) (Note: See) (Note: See) (Note: 693 in Colombia, 16 in Venezuela)
1965	Israeli–Palestinian conflict: Gaza–Israel conflict	Asia	Palestine; Israel	304
1999	Internal conflict in Bangladesh: 2018–2019 Bangladesh drug war	Asia	Bangladesh	211
1967	Naxalite–Maoist insurgency	Asia	India	412
1969	Moro conflict	Asia	Philippines	268
1969	Communist rebellion in the Philippines	Asia	Philippines	203
1984	Kurdish–Turkish conflict: Kurdish–Turkish conflict (2015–present)	Asia	Turkey; Iraq; Syria	523 (Note: 464 in Turkey and 59 in Iraq, casualties in Syria are part of the Syrian Civil War)
1996	Allied Democratic Forces insurgency	Africa	Democratic Republic of the Congo	235
1999	Ituri conflict	Africa	Democratic Republic of the Congo	369
2003	War in Darfur	Africa	Sudan	599
2004	Kivu conflict	Africa	Democratic Republic of the Congo	943
2004	War in North-West Pakistan	Asia	Pakistan	217
2011	Libyan Crisis: Libyan Civil War (2014–present)	Africa	Libya	727
2011	Sinai insurgency	Africa	Egypt	740
2011	South Kordofan conflict	Africa	Sudan	114
2012	Central African Republic conflict	Africa	Central African Republic	838
2013	Batwa-Luba clashes	Africa	Democratic Republic of the Congo	154
2014	War in Donbass	Europe	Ukraine	153
2015	Burundian unrest	Africa	Burundi	198
2016	Oromo-Somali clashes	Africa	Ethiopia	865
2017	Anglophone Crisis	Africa	Cameroon	652
2017	Islamist insurgency in Mozambique	Africa	Mozambique	161

== Fewer than 100 deaths in 2018 ==
Conflicts in the following list have caused at least 1 and fewer than 100 direct violent deaths in 2018.

Start of conflict	Conflict	Continent	Location	Fatalities in 2018
1922	Arab separatism in Khuzestan: ASMLA insurgency	Asia	Iran	10
1946	Kurdish separatism in Iran	Asia	Iran	62–66
1960	South Thailand insurgency	Asia	Thailand	65
1954	Insurgency in Northeast India: Insurgency in Meghalaya; Assam separatist movements; Insurgency in Manipur; Ethnic conflict in Nagaland	Asia	India	72
1963	West Papua conflict	Asia	Indonesia	21–26
1975	Cabinda War	Africa	Angola	4
1980	Internal conflict in Peru	South America	Peru	10 (Note: See)
1982	Casamance conflict	Africa	Senegal	4
1987	LRA insurgency	Africa	Democratic Republic of the Congo; Central African Republic	14 (Note: 10 in DRC, 4 in CAR)
1988	Nagorno-Karabakh conflict	Asia	Azerbaijan	4 (Note: See)
1989	Georgian–Ossetian conflict	Asia	South Ossetia	1
1989	Sectarian violence in Pakistan	Asia	Pakistan	7
1995	Ogaden insurgency	Africa	Ethiopia	21
2005	Insurgency in Paraguay	South America	Paraguay	3
2009	Sudanese nomadic conflicts	Africa	Sudan	18
2013	Insurgency in Egypt	Africa	Egypt	40
2016	Kamwina Nsapu rebellion	Africa	Democratic Republic of the Congo; Angola	46

== See also ==
- Lists of wars in World (by date, region, type of conflict)
  - Lists of wars and conflict by region
    - Lists of battles (Orders)
  - List of terrorist incidents
    - List of active rebel groups
    - List of designated terrorist organizations
  - List of number of conflicts per year
    - List of most lethal battles in world history
- Africa:
  - List of conflicts in Africa (Military history of Africa)
    - List of modern conflicts in North Africa (Maghreb)
    - Conflicts in the Horn of Africa (East region)
- Americas:
  - List of conflicts in North America
    - List of wars involving the United States
  - List of conflicts in Central America
  - List of conflicts in South America
- Asia:
  - List of conflicts in Asia
  - List of conflicts in the Near East
  - List of conflicts in the Middle East
    - List of modern conflicts in the Middle East
- Europe:
  - List of conflicts in Europe
    - Post-Cold War European conflicts
- Others :
  - List of wars extended by diplomatic irregularity
  - Uppsala Conflict Data Program
  - Failed State
- Ongoing conflicts in World:
  - List of ongoing armed conflicts
  - List of wars 2011–present
    - Ongoing military conflicts
    - Maps of ongoing conflicts
