= List of armed conflicts in 2014 =

The following is a list of armed conflicts with victims in 2014.

The Heidelberg Institute for International Conflict Research estimated that there were 223 politically-motivated armed conflicts (of which 46 estimated as highly violent: 21 full-scale wars, 25 limited wars) worldwide during 2014.

Locations of conflicts worldwide in 2014 Major wars, 10,000+ deaths in 2014 Wars, 1,000–9,999 deaths in 2014 Minor conflicts, 100–999 deaths in 2014 Skirmishes and clashes, fewer than 100 deaths in 2014 2015 →

== List guidelines ==
This list is an archive of armed conflicts having done globally at least 100 victims and at least 1 victim during the year 2014.

== 10,000 or more deaths in 2014 ==
Start of conflict	Conflict	Continent	Location	Fatalities in 2014
1978	War in Afghanistan: Current phase	Asia	Afghanistan	14,277 (Note: See)
2003	Iraqi conflict: Iraqi Civil War (2014–2017)	Asia	Iraq	24,000–50,000 (Note: See)
2009	Boko Haram insurgency	Africa	Nigeria; Cameroon; Niger; Chad	10,849 (Note: See)
2011	Syrian Civil War	Asia	Syria	110,920
2013	South Sudanese Civil War	Africa	South Sudan	50,000

== 1,000–9,999 deaths in 2014 ==
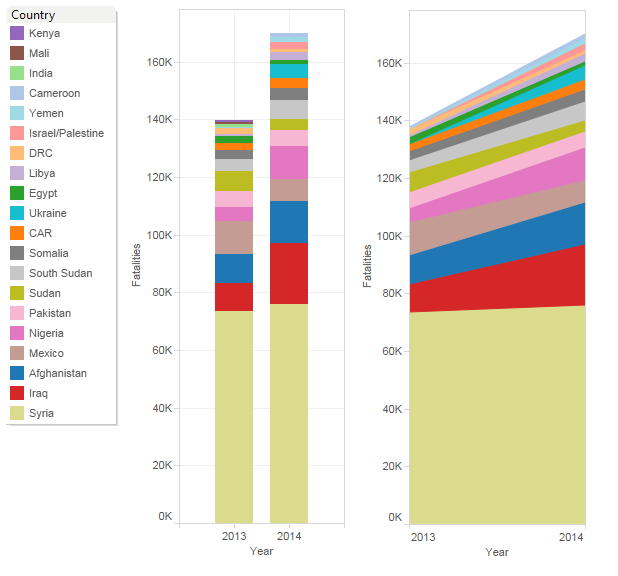
Conflict-related fatalities: 1) in the world's deadliest countries in 2013 and 2014 (left); 2) in the world's deadliest countries in 2014 and in the same countries in 2013 (right).

Start of conflict	Conflict	Continent	Location	Fatalities in 2014
1964	Israeli–Palestinian conflict: 2014 Israel–Gaza conflict	Asia	Israel; Palestine	2,365
1991	Somali Civil War: Current phase; Insurgency in North-eastern Kenya	Africa	Somalia; Kenya	2,983–3,033 (Note: 70–120 in Kenya, 2,913 in Somalia)
1998	Communal conflicts in Nigeria	Africa	Nigeria	1,822
2003	War in Darfur	Africa	Sudan	2,101
2004	War in North-West Pakistan	Asia	Pakistan	5,496
2006	Mexican drug war	North America	Mexico	7,504 (Note: See)
2011	Libyan Crisis: Factional violence in Libya (2011–2014); Libyan Civil War (2014–present)	Africa	Libya	2,825 (Note: 176 in the Factional violence in Libya, 2,649 in the Libyan Civil War)
2011	Yemeni Crisis: Houthi insurgency in Yemen; Al-Qaeda insurgency in Yemen; South Yemen insurgency	Asia	Yemen	1,500–7,700
2012	Central African Republic Civil War (2012–present)	Africa	CAR	3,347
2014	War in Donbas	Europe	Ukraine	4,771

== 100–999 deaths in 2014 ==
Start of conflict	Conflict	Continent	Location	Fatalities in 2014
1947	Kashmir conflict (Indo-Pakistani Wars): India–Pakistan border skirmishes (2014–2015)	Asia	India; Pakistan	193
1948	Balochistan conflict: Sistan and Baluchestan insurgency	Asia	Pakistan; Iran	339+ (Note: See)
1960	South Thailand insurgency	Asia	Thailand	300+
1960	Katanga insurgency	Africa	DRC	123
1964	Colombian conflict	South America	Colombia	459
1964	Insurgency in Northeast India: Insurgency in Meghalaya; Assam separatist movements; Insurgency in Manipur; Ethnic conflict in Nagaland; Tripura rebellion; Insurgency in Mizoram; Insurgency in Arunachal Pradesh	Asia	India	465 (Note: 305 in Assam, 76 in Meghalaya, 54 in Manipur, 15 in Nagaland, 9 in Arunachal Pradesh, 4 in Tripura, 2 in Mizoram)
1967	Naxalite–Maoist insurgency	Asia	India	314
1979	Assam separatist movements	Asia	India	305 (Note: Casualties are part of the Northeast India conflict.)
1989	Sectarianism in Pakistan	Asia	Pakistan	208
1989	Xinjiang conflict	Asia	China	500+ (Note: See)
1995	Ogaden insurgency	Africa	Ethiopia	172
1996	Allied Democratic Forces insurgency	Africa	(Democratic Republic of the Congo) DRC	440 (Note: See)
2004	Kivu conflict	Africa	DRC; Burundi	468 (Note: See)
2009	Sudanese nomadic conflicts	Africa	Sudan	995
2009	Insurgency in the North Caucasus	Europe	Russia	341
2011	Sinai insurgency	Asia	Egypt	981
2011	South Kordofan conflict	Africa	Sudan	746
2011	Syrian Civil War spillover in Lebanon	Asia	Lebanon	297 (Note: See)
2012	Northern Mali conflict	Africa	Mali	380 (Note: See)
2013	Insurgency in Egypt	Africa	Egypt	195

== Fewer than 100 deaths in 2014 ==
Start of conflict	Conflict	Continent	Location	Fatalities in 2014
1946	Kurdish separatism in Iran	Asia	Iran	11+
1948	Internal conflict in Myanmar	Asia	Myanmar	66+ (Note: See)
1950	Insurgency in Tripura	Asia	India	4 (Note: Casualties of the Tripura conflict are part of the Northeast India conflict.)
1954	Ethnic conflict in Nagaland	Asia	India	15 (Note: Casualties of the Nagaland conflict are part of the Northeast India conflict.)
1963	West Papua conflict	Asia	Indonesia	25 (Note: See)
1964	Insurgency in Manipur	Asia	India	54 (Note: Casualties of the Manipur conflict are part of the Northeast India conflict.)
1964	Insurgency in Mizoram	Asia	India	2 (Note: Casualties of the Mizoram conflict are part of the Northeast India conflict.)
1969	Communist rebellion in the Philippines	Asia	Philippines	87 (Note: See)
1969	Moro conflict	Asia	Philippines; Malaysia	91 (Note: See)
1975	Cabinda War	Africa	Angola	5
1980	Internal conflict in Peru	South America	Peru	5+ (Note: See)
1976	Bab al-Tabbaneh–Jabal Mohsen conflict	Asia	Lebanon	26
1980	Insurgency in Arunachal Pradesh	Asia	India	9 (Note: Casualties of the Arunachal Pradesh conflict are part of the Northeast India conflict.)
1984	Kurdish–Turkish conflict (1978–present): Current phase	Asia	Turkey; Iraq	57+
1987	LRA insurgency	Africa	DRC; CAR; South Sudan	16
1988	Nagorno-Karabakh conflict	Asia	Armenia; Azerbaijan	71
1999	Internal conflict in Bangladesh	Asia	Bangladesh	76
1991	FRUD conflict	Africa	Djibouti	12
1992	OLF insurgency	Africa	Ethiopia	46
1992	Insurgency in Meghalaya	Asia	India	76 (Note: Casualties of the Meghalaya conflict are part of the Northeast India conflict.)
1994	Chiapas conflict	North America	Mexico	1
1995	Eritrean–Ethiopian border conflict: Second Afar insurgency	Africa	Eritrea	34
1999	Ituri conflict	Africa	DRC	26
2002	Insurgency in the Maghreb: Chaambi Operations; Libyan Civil War (2014–present); Northern Mali conflict; Factional violence in Libya (2011–2014)	Africa	Algeria; Tunisia; Libya; Mali	42+ (Note: See)
2004	Conflict in the Niger Delta	Africa	Nigeria	13 (Note: See)
2012	Chaambi Operations	Africa	Tunisia	16
2013	RENAMO insurgency	Africa	Mozambique	50 (Note: See)

== Deaths by country ==
This section details armed-conflict-related fatalities by country.

	2014 (Note: Data for African countries are based on ACLED, excluding riots/protests-related fatalities)	
Rank	Country	Deaths
1	Syria	▲76,021
2	South Sudan	▲50,000
3	Mexico	▼27,662*
4	Iraq	▲24,000
5	Afghanistan	▲14,638
6	Nigeria	▲11,360
7	Pakistan	▼5,519
8	Ukraine	▲4,771
9	Somalia	▲4,447
10	Sudan	▼3,892
11	Central African Republic	▲3,347
12	Libya	▲2,825
13	Palestine	▲2,365
14	Yemen	▲1,500
15	Cameroon	▲1,366
16	Democratic Republic of the Congo	▼1,235
17	Egypt	▲1,176

== See also ==
- List of number of conflicts per year
- List of active rebel groups
- List of designated terrorist organizations
- List of terrorist incidents
- List of wars extended by diplomatic irregularity
- Lists of wars
- Uppsala Conflict Data Program
- Failed State
