= ICE attack =

ICE attack or Ice Attack may refer to:

- The 2025 Alvarado ICE facility attack, a 4 July 2025 attack on a U.S Immigration and Customs Enforcement (ICE) detention facility in Alvarado, Texas
- The 2025 Dallas ICE facility shooting, a 24 September 2025 shooting attack on an ICE field office in Dallas, Texas
- "Ice Attack", a 2024 song on the album We Don't Trust You by American rapper Future and American record producer Metro Boomin
- Ice Attack, a 2007 mixtape by American rapper Gucci Mane
- Detention and deportation of American citizens in the second Trump administration,
- Impersonations of United States immigration officials, Impersonations of American government agents

== See also ==
- List of military operations on ice
