= List of number of conflicts per year =

This page tracks the number of military conflicts with more than 1,000 fatalities, a categorization used by the Uppsala Conflict Data Program. It covers past years. For a list of ongoing conflicts, see: List of ongoing armed conflicts.

== Number of conflicts per year ==
Year	+10,000	+1,000	Map and evolution Major wars, 10,000+ deaths in year Wars, 1,000–9,999 deaths in year	Armed conflict-related fatalities by country
2026				
2025				
2024				
2023				
2022				
2021				
2020				
2019				
2018	4: Mexican drug war; Syrian Civil War; War in Afghanistan; Yemeni Civil War	7: Boko Haram insurgency; Communal conflicts in Nigeria; Mali War; Mexican drug war; South Sudanese Civil War; War in Somalia; Iraqi insurgency		Rank / Country / Deaths; 1 / Afghanistan / ▲35,941; 2 / Mexico / ▲33,341; 3 / Yemen / ▲22,201; 4 / Syria / ▼20,130; 5 / Iraq / ▼4,920; 6 / Nigeria / ▲4,850; 7 / Somalia / ▼3,862; 8 / Saudi Arabia / ▲3,509; 9 / DR Congo / ▼1,757; 10 / Mali / ▲1,285; 11 / South Sudan / ▼1,166; 12 / Cameroon / ▲945; 13 / India / ▲939; 14 / Ethiopia / ▼886; 15 / CAR / ▼842; 16 / Pakistan / ▼736; 17 / Libya / ▼727; 18 / Colombia / ▲709; 19 / Sudan / ▼600; 20 / Turkey / ▼530
2017	4: Mexican drug war; Syrian Civil War; War in Afghanistan; War in Iraq	15: Boko Haram insurgency; Central African Republic Civil War; Communal conflicts in Nigeria; Internal conflict in Myanmar; Northern Rakhine State clashes; Kurdish–Turkish conflict (2015–present); Moro conflict; Oromo conflict; Second Libyan Civil War; Sinai insurgency; South Kordofan conflict; South Sudanese Civil War; War in Darfur; War in Somalia; Yemeni Civil War		Rank / Country / Deaths; 1 / Syria / ▼39,000; 2 / Mexico / ▲31,174*; 3 / Afghanistan / ▼23,065; 4 / Iraq / ▼13,187; 5 / Myanmar / ▲6,700+; 6 / Somalia / ▼4,969; 7 / South Sudan / ▼3,528; 8 / Nigeria / ▼3,432; 9 / Sudan / ▼2,450; 10 / DR Congo / ▲1,857; 11 / CAR / ▲1,757; 12 / Libya / ▼1,564; 13 / Egypt / ▼1,506; 14 / Ethiopia / ▲1,445; 15 / Philippines / ▲1,429; 16 / Yemen / ▼1,319; 17 / Pakistan / ▼1,269; 18 / Mali / ▲926; 19 / India / ▼812; 20 / Turkey / ▼802
2016	3: War in Iraq; Syrian Civil War; War in Afghanistan	11: Boko Haram insurgency; Communal conflicts in Nigeria; Kurdish–Turkish conflict (2015–present); Mexican drug war; Second Libyan Civil War; Sinai insurgency; South Kordofan conflict; South Sudanese Civil War; War in Darfur; War in Somalia; Yemeni Civil War		Rank / Country / Deaths; 1 / Syria / ▼49,742; 2 / Mexico / ▲23,953*; 3 / Iraq / ▼23,898; 4 / Afghanistan / ▼23,539; 5 / Somalia / ▲5,575; 6 / Nigeria / ▼4,684; 7 / Sudan / ▲3,891; 8 / South Sudan / ▲3,544; 9 / Libya / ▲2,865; 10 / Turkey / ▲2,013; 11 / Pakistan / ▼1,803; 12 / Egypt / ▼1,707; 13 / DR Congo / ▼1,565; 14 / Yemen / ▼1,375; 15 / Ethiopia / ▲1,114; 16 / India / ▲907; 17 / Ukraine / ▼902; 18 / CAR / ▲623; 19 / Burundi / ▼461; 20 / Algeria / ▼128
2015	4: Boko Haram insurgency; Syrian Civil War; War in Afghanistan; War in Iraq	10: Mexican drug war; Second Libyan Civil War; Sinai insurgency; South Kordofan conflict; South Sudanese Civil War; 2015 PKK rebellion; War in Donbas; Insurgency in Khyber Pakhtunkhwa; War in Somalia; Yemeni Civil War	Main conflicts in 2015	Rank / Country / Deaths (Note: Data for African countries are based on ACLED, excluding riots/protests-related fatalities"ACLED Version 6 (1997–2015)". Armed Conflict Location & Event Data Project. Archived from the original on 18 January 2016.); 1 / Syria / ▼55,219; 2 / Afghanistan / ▲36,345; 3 / Iraq / ▲24,113; 4 / Nigeria / ▼10,677; 5 / Mexico / ▲8,122; 6 / Yemen / ▲6,425; 7 / Pakistan / ▼4,612; 8 / Ukraine / ▼4,344; 9 / Somalia / ▼4,087; 10 / South Sudan / ▼3,258; 11 / Sudan / ▼3,216; 12 / Egypt / ▲2,836; 13 / Libya / ▼2,706; 14 / DR Congo / ▲1,699; 15 / Cameroon / ▲1,429; 16 / Niger / ▲986; 17 / Myanmar / ▲881; 18 / India / ▼729; 19 / Ethiopia / ▲602; 20 / Burundi / ▲551; 21 / Philippines / ▲501; 22 / CAR / ▼475; 23 / Mali / ▲414; 24 / Colombia / ▼410; 25 / Thailand / ▼246; 26 / Russia / ▼209; 27 / China / ▼197; 28 / Israel/Palestine / ▼190; 29 / Lebanon / ▼91; 30 / Iran / ▲64
2014	5: Boko Haram insurgency; War in Iraq; South Sudanese Civil War; Syrian Civil War; War in Afghanistan	10: Central African Republic War; Communal conflicts in Nigeria; Israeli–Palestinian conflict; Second Libyan Civil War; Mexican drug war; War in Darfur; War in Donbas; Insurgency in Khyber Pakhtunkhwa; War in Somalia; Yemeni Civil War	Main conflicts in 2014	Rank / Country / Deaths; 1 / Syria / ▲76,021; 2 / South Sudan / ▲50,000; 3 / Iraq / ▲24,000; 4 / Afghanistan / ▲14,638; 5 / Nigeria / ▲11,360; 6 / Mexico / ▼7,504; 7 / Ukraine / ▲5,798; 8 / Pakistan / ▼5,496; 9 / Somalia / ▲4,447; 10 / Sudan / ▼3,892; 11 / Central African Republic / ▲3,347; 12 / Libya / ▲2,825; 13 / Israel/Palestine / ▲2,365; 14 / Yemen / ▲1,500; 15 / Cameroon / ▲1,366; 16 / DR Congo / ▼1,235; 17 / Egypt / ▲1,176; 18 / India / ▲1,012; 19 / Kenya / ▼618; 20 / China / ▲500; 21 / Colombia / ▲459; 22 / Philippines / ▲386; 23 / Mali / ▼380; 24 / Russia / ▼341; 25 / Thailand / ▼330; 26 / Ethiopia / ▲309; 27 / Lebanon / ▲297; 28 / Algeria / ▼242; 29 / Bangladesh / ▲76; 30 / Armenia/Azerbaijan / ▲71
2013	3: Syrian Civil War; Mexican drug war; War in Afghanistan	10: Boko Haram insurgency; Central African Republic conflict; Communal conflicts in Nigeria; Iraqi insurgency; Kivu conflict; South Sudanese Civil War; War in Darfur; Insurgency in Khyber Pakhtunkhwa; War in Somalia	Main conflicts in 2013	Rank / Country / Deaths; 1 / Syria / 73,447; 2 / Mexico / 11,324; 3 / Afghanistan / 10,172; 4 / Iraq / 9,852; 5 / Sudan / 6,816; 6 / Pakistan / 5,379; 7 / Nigeria / 4,727; 8 / South Sudan / 4,168; 9 / Somalia / 3,153; 10 / Central African Republic / 2,364; 11 / DR Congo / 1,976; 12 / India / 873; 13 / Mali / 870; 14 / Egypt / 730; 15 / Kenya / 705; 16 / Libya / 643; 17 / Yemen / 600; 18 / Russia / 529; 19 / Thailand / 455; 20 / Algeria / 340; 21 / Philippines / 322; 22 / Colombia / 124; 23 / Myanmar / 62
2012	2: Mexican drug war; Syrian Civil War	6: War in Afghanistan; Iraqi Insurgency; Insurgency in Khyber Pakhtunkhwa; War in Somalia; Yemeni Crisis; War in Darfur		Rank / Country / Deaths; 1 / Mexico / 18,061; 2 / Syria / 14,825; 3 / Afghanistan / 7,225; 4 / Pakistan / 6,211; 5 / Iraq / 4,622; 6 / Somalia / 2,445; 7 / Yemen / 2,328; 8 / Sudan / 1,119; 9 / India / 837; 10 / Nigeria / 812; 11 / Turkey / 811; 12 / Russia / 700; 13 / DR Congo / 611; 14 / Algeria / 244; 15 / Colombia / 211; 16 / South Sudan / 137
2011	1: Mexican drug war	3: Libyan Civil War; Insurgency in Khyber Pakhtunkhwa; Iraqi insurgency		Rank / Country / Deaths; 1 / Mexico / 24,068; 2 / Libya / 9,400; 3 / Pakistan / 6,303; 4 / Iraq / 4,162; 5 / India / 1,059; 6 / Russia / 750; 7 / Nepal / 19
2010		2: Insurgency in Khyber Pakhtunkhwa; Iraqi insurgency		Rank / Country / Deaths; 1 / Pakistan / 7,435; 2 / Iraq / 4,167; 3 / India / 1,885; 4 / Russia / 749; 5 / Nepal / 38
2009	2: Sri Lankan civil war; Insurgency in Khyber Pakhtunkhwa	1: Iraqi insurgency		Rank / Country / Deaths; 1 / Sri Lanka / 15,565; 2 / Pakistan / 11,704; 3 / Iraq / 5,382; 4 / India / 2,263; 5 / Nepal / 50
2008	2: Sri Lankan civil war; Iraqi insurgency	1: Insurgency in Khyber Pakhtunkhwa		Rank / Country / Deaths; 1 / Sri Lanka / 11,144; 2 / Iraq / 10,286; 3 / Pakistan / 6,715; 4 / India / 2,605; 5 / Nepal / 81
2007	1: Iraqi insurgency	2: Sri Lankan civil war; Insurgency in Khyber Pakhtunkhwa		Rank / Country / Deaths; 1 / Iraq / 26,112; 2 / Sri Lanka / 4,377; 3 / Pakistan / 3,598; 4 / India / 2,703; 5 / Nepal / 99
2006	1: Iraqi insurgency	2: Sri Lankan civil war; Insurgency in Khyber Pakhtunkhwa		Rank / Country / Deaths; 1 / Iraq / 29,526; 2 / Sri Lanka / 4,126; 3 / India / 2,795; 4 / Pakistan / 1,471; 5 / Nepal / 480
2005	1: Iraqi insurgency	1: Nepalese Civil War		Rank / Country / Deaths; 1 / Iraq / 16,583; 2 / India / 3,239; 3 / Nepal / 1,845; 4 / Pakistan / 648; 5 / Sri Lanka / 330
2004	1: Iraqi insurgency	1: Nepalese Civil War		Rank / Country / Deaths; 1 / Iraq / 11,737; 2 / Nepal / 2,451; 3 / Pakistan / 863; 4 / Sri Lanka / 109
2003	1: 2003 invasion of Iraq	1: Nepalese Civil War		Rank / Country / Deaths; 1 / Iraq / 12,153; 2 / Nepal / 2,105; 3 / Pakistan / 189; 4 / Sri Lanka / 59
