= Clifton Moor Skirmish =

Battle fought during the Jacobite Uprising of 1745

Battle of Clifton Moor
- Part of the Jacobite rising of 1745
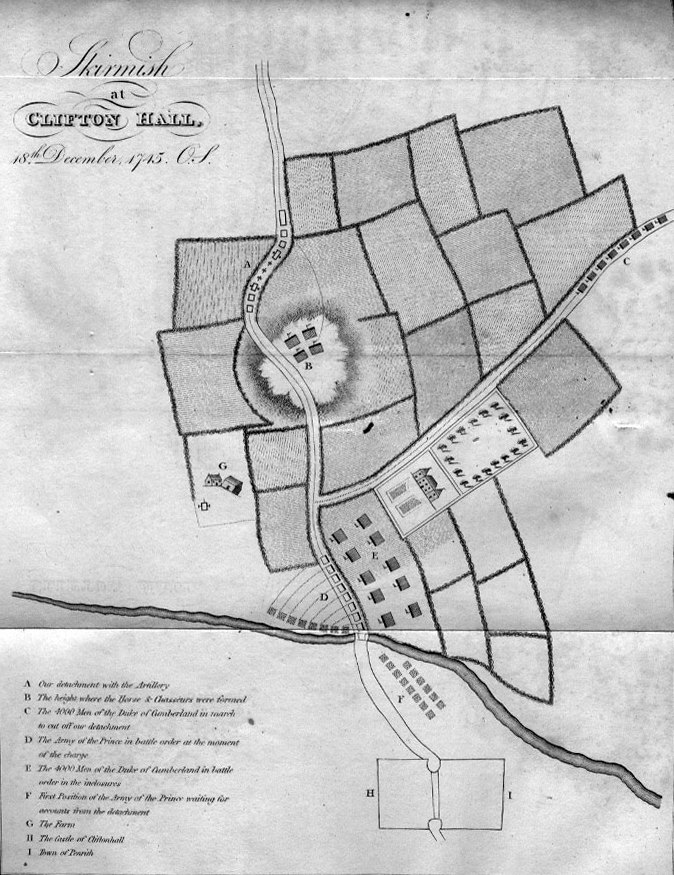
- Action at Clifton Hall, the 18th of December, James Johnstone
Date	18 December 1745
Location	Clifton, England, Great Britain 54.627°N 2.718°W
Result	Inconclusive

Belligerents
Jacobites	(Kingdom of Great Britain) British Government

Commanders and leaders
George Murray	Duke of Cumberland; Philip Honywood

Strength
1,000	500

Casualties and losses
13 killed and wounded	14 killed and wounded

The Clifton Moor Skirmish (also referred to as the Battle of Clifton Moor or Clifton Moor Action) took place on the evening of Wednesday 18 December during the Jacobite rising of 1745. Following the decision of the council of Charles Edward Stuart to retreat from Derby on 6 December, the fast-moving Jacobite army split into three smaller columns; on the morning of 18th, a small force of dragoons led by Cumberland and Sir Philip Honywood made contact with the Jacobite rearguard, at that point commanded by Lord George Murray.

Murray ordered his baggage train to continue its retreat towards Penrith while he delayed Cumberland's force. The action did not begin until late afternoon, in failing light and heavy rain; while technically a draw, it enabled Murray to retreat in good order and escape into Scotland.

The battle is considered to be one of the last battles on British soil.

== Background; the retreat from Derby and arrival at Clifton ==
The Jacobite Army stayed on the first night of retreat at Ashbourne, Derbyshire. They reached Leek the following day: on the 9th, both Jacobite divisions met on the road to Manchester.

The Jacobite army left Manchester on the 10th and reached Wigan that night. The next day they reached Preston; the Duke of Perth was sent north with a cavalry escort to bring back reinforcements from Scotland. Prince Charles and the main army arrived in Lancaster on the evening of the 13th; the Jacobite commanders considered staying there and fighting, but their lieutenant-general Lord George Murray had also received reports that a large body of General George Wade's dragoons had entered Preston shortly after the Jacobite departure. Charles changed his mind and decided to continue northwards.

The government forces under Wade and the Duke of Cumberland arrived at Macclesfield on 10 December, where Cumberland was told the Jacobites had left Manchester that day. Leaving Lancaster on 15 December, Charles' army was scarcely out of the town when an advance guard of government horse entered it. The Jacobites formed in order of battle, but upon the alarm turning out to be false, the army continued to Kendal.

The army entered Kendal that night, where they were met by Perth and his party, who had turned back after being attacked by militia at Penrith. On the retreat, Prince Charles had requested that Murray attempt to save as many of his cannons and cannonballs as possible which led a delay on the night of 16 December at Shap as over 200 cannonballs had to be carried up the hills around Shap. The following day, the Jacobite army passed through the village of Clifton with Murray's rearguard force being the last to approach Clifton on 18 December.

Around 200-300 government cavalry had formed up on Thrimby Hill in the rearguard's path; unsure of the size of the forces facing him, Murray initially held his position. Colonel Brown, a professional in the Irish Brigade who led the Jacobite column, moved several companies of the Edinburgh Regiment forward in attack. Murray, at the rear, ordered Glengarry's Regiment across country to support them. Both parties were surprised to find the only enemy in view was the light horse they had observed a few minutes before, who galloped off in disorder at the Jacobites' appearance. At sight of the government forces, Murray had sent a rider with a message to Charles for further orders.

The rearguard resumed its march, and on reaching the village of Clifton proper, Murray sent the artillery and heavy baggage forward to Penrith under a small escort. He placed several units in the enclosures around Lowther Hall in the hope of attacking the government cavalry; they succeeded in taking two prisoners, who told Murray that Cumberland himself, with 4,000 horse, was about a mile behind him. He sent Colonel Stuart to Charles at Penrith, requesting reinforcements and approval to make a stand at Clifton. Back in the village, Murray gathered his available forces. He posted the Glengarry men in enclosures west of the road, with the Appin Regiment and Macpherson of Cluny's on the east, and the Edinburgh Regiment on the road closer to Clifton. Murrays force numbered approximately 1,000 men. As well as the Glengarry men, it included the MacPhersons (under Ewen MacPherson of Cluny) and Clan Stewart of Appin (under Ardsheal).

== Skirmish ==
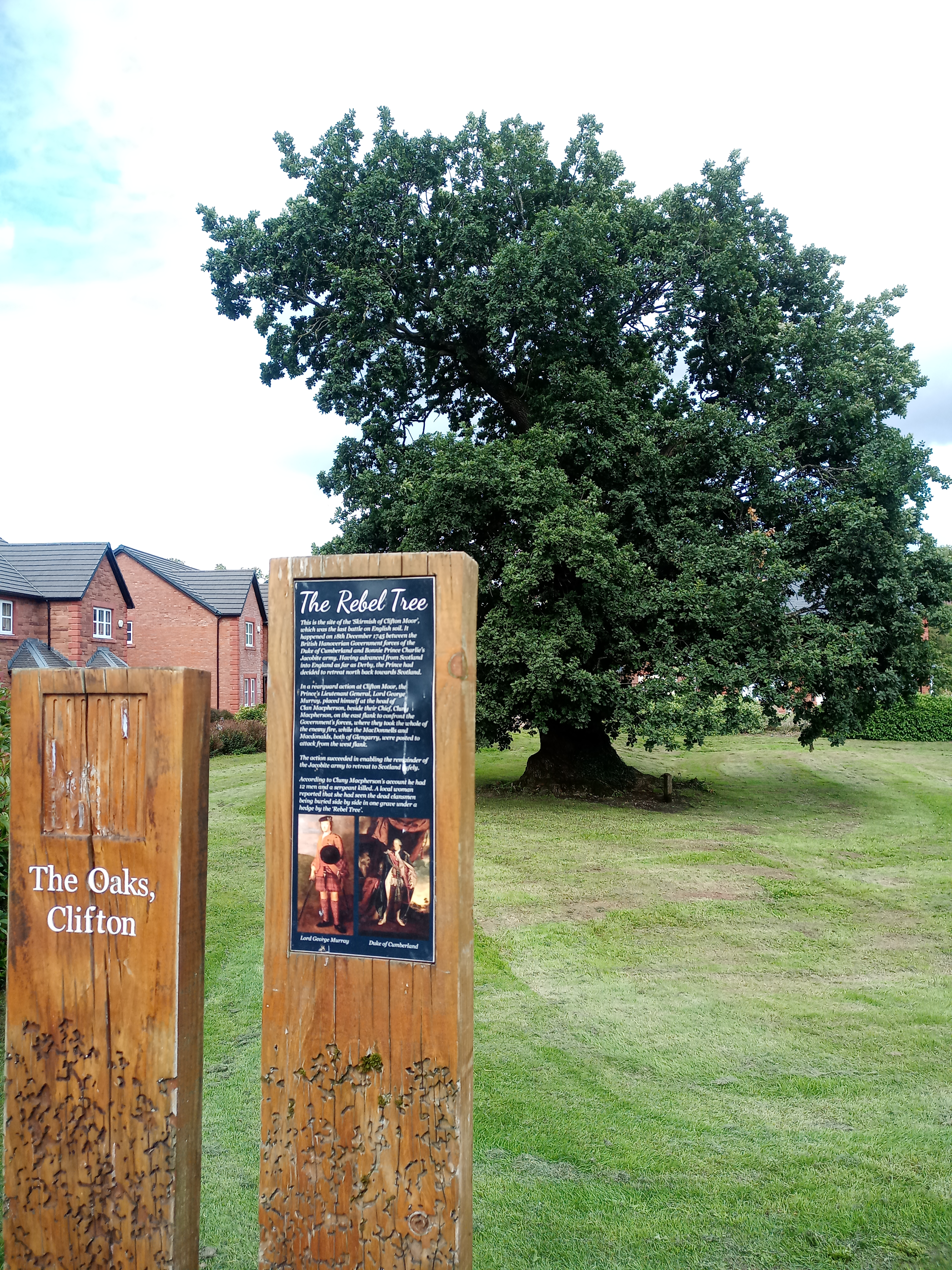
Site of the battle at the Jacobite rebel oak tree at Clifton

Late in the afternoon about 500 government dragoons dismounted and advanced towards the Jacobite positions. These included riders from the King's Own Regiment, Mark Kerr's and Cobham's regiments. Murray was told that Charles's orders were to immediately retreat to Penrith, but could not disengage as the dragoons had already begun firing on them.

Murray gave verbal orders to the Glengarry officers to support an attack on the hedges and ditches separating the dragoons from their positions; he then returned east of the road and placed himself at the head of the Macphersons. It was now about an hour after sunset, with occasional moonlight through broken cloud; the Jacobites had the advantage of being able to see their opponents but their own movements could not be observed.

The Stewarts and Macphersons marched forward at the word of command, as did the Macdonalds and MacDonnells on the west. The men on the west kept firing as they advanced, but the Macphersons, who were on the east, soon came into contact with the English dragoons and received the whole of their fire. Murray drew his sword and cried out, "Claymore!", and Cluny Macpherson doing the same, the Macphersons rushed down to the bottom ditch of the enclosure. Clearing the diagonal hedges as they went, they fell sword in hand upon the enemy, of whom a considerable number were killed at the lower ditch. The rest retreated across the moor, but received in their flight the fire of the MacDonnell of Glengarry regiment.

== Aftermath ==
Twelve Jacobite soldiers were reported to have been killed in the skirmish and about twice that number were said to have been wounded. The only Jacobite officer wounded was the Macdonald of Glengarry chief. Lord George Murray had several narrow escapes from gunfire, with a musket ball said to have passed through his long hair wig.

On the Government side, some forty dragoons were killed or wounded. One British dragoon is recorded as dying in Clifton several weeks later, presumably of wounds received in the battle. The dragoons killed in the battle are buried in St Cuthbert's churchyard. Near the churchyard gate is a stone commemorating the skirmish.

The only prisoner taken on this occasion was a footman of the Duke of Cumberland. This man was sent back to his royal highness by Charles.

A skeleton wearing tartan, found in the 1920s near Stanhope, is believed to have been a Jacobite casualty of the skirmish, though this is uncertain.

The small victory allowed Murray and his rearguard to secure their retreat, joining Charles and the main army the next day at Penrith.

== Most recent battle on English soil ==
There are at least three contenders for the claim to have been the last battle on English soil, as different historians have used different definitions for what constitutes a battle. If Clifton Moor was a "skirmish" and not a battle, and if the Battle of Preston, fought during Jacobite rising of 1715, was a siege and not a battle, and the Battle of Reading (1688) is discounted as a street fight, then the last pitched battle on English soil was the battle of Sedgemoor fought in 1685, which was the decisive battle in the Monmouth Rebellion. However either of the former, or possibly the Battle of Bossenden Wood (1838), can also be considered the last battle, depending on how a battle is defined while the Battle of Graveney Marsh (1940) could also be counted as a skirmish. There is also a certain semanticism in the expression "last battle on English soil", for it specifically excludes the subsequent Second World War air battles over English soil, particularly the Battle of Britain (10 July to 31 October 1940) which was fought in the skies over Kent and the winter blitz of 1940–1941 which is sometimes called the Battle of London. The claim to be the most recent battle site in England, for what were relatively small armed confrontations, is useful for promoting tourism at the locations.

== See also ==
- Duke of Cumberland
- Charles Edward Stuart
- Jacobite risings
- Clifton, Cumbria

== Sources ==
- Douglas, Hugh (1975). Charles Edward Stuart. London: Hale. ISBN 978-0709148159.
- McLynn, Frank (1998). The Jacobite Army in England, 1745. Edinburgh: John Donald. ISBN 978-0-85976-488-9.
- Preston, Diana (1995). The Road to Culloden Moor. Bonnie Prince Charlie and the 45' Rebellion. Constable. ISBN 978-0094761704.
- Riding, Jacqueline (2016). Jacobites: A New History of the 45 Rebellion. Bloomsbury. ISBN 978-1408819128.
- Royle, Trevor (2016). Culloden; Scotland's Last Battle and the Forging of the British Empire. Little, Brown. ISBN 978-1408704011.
