= Timeline of New People's Army attacks (2016) =

This timeline contains the events of the communist rebellion of the year 2016.

== Timeline ==
=== January ===
- January 8 – A NPA rebel accompanied by his mother surrendered to the authorities in Zamboanga del Norte.
- January 20 – The 16th Infantry Battalion arrives in Tandag, Surigao del Sur for deployment against the NPA.
- January 26 – Three soldiers were killed in a gunfight between suspected NPA rebels and soldiers in Kalinga.
- January 30 – NPA guerillas torched two bulldozers owned by Del Monte Philippines Inc. and a boom sprayer owned by Lapanday Pineapple Plantation Company; another attack targeted a spray truck of Dole Philippines Inc. in Malaybalay, Bukidnon.

=== February ===
- February 3 – Two separate clashes between government troops and NPA rebels occurred in Pantukan, Compostela Valley resulting in 3 soldiers killed.
- February 7 – The Cotabato provincial civil security unit chief and his bodyguard were killed by three NPA gunmen.
- February 9–10 – Two separate clashes occurred in Compostela Valley between government forces and NPA rebels resulting in two rebels killed.
- February 11 – The Army deployed more troops in Surigao del Norte and Surigao del Sur to prevent the NPA rebels from extorting from electoral candidates.
- February 16 – Six policemen were killed and 8 were wounded after 40 NPA rebels ambushed the group of the Regional Public Safety Battalion in Baggao, Cagayan.
- February 18 – A police car in Candoni, Negros Occidental was ambushed by NPA rebels resulting in 2 policemen dead and 4 others injured.
- February 23 – The NPA claimed responsibility for the ambush on a police patrol car in Candoni, Negros Occidental.
- February 25 – In an emailed statement, Maria Malaya, the spokesperson of the National Democratic Front said the NPA launched 19 attacks against military troops in 4 provinces in northeastern Mindanao.
- February 20 – Troops from the 60th Infantry Battalion along with CAFGU members captured a bomb making factory of the NPA in Kapalong, Davao del Norte.
- February 29 – The AFP intensified its drive to get more members of the NPA to surrender.

=== March ===
- March 1 – The Northern Mindanao Police Regional Office 10 placed all field units on "full alert" status in preparation for the NPA's 47th anniversary on March 29 and the May presidential elections.
- March 1 – Banana and pineapple farmers reported increased attacks by the NPA rebels on farms, facilities and equipment.
- March 7 – A raid was conducted by NPA rebels in a police station in Balangkayan, Eastern Samar. The rebels ransacked the armory and took 16 Armalite rifles, a shotgun, 2 laptops, uniforms and personal belongings.
- March 9 – A firefight occurred between the Army and NPA rebels at around 12:00 noon in Sitio Baganao, Brgy. Kibalabag, Malaybalay, Bukidnon.
- March 14 – A political adviser of the NPA's Guerilla Front 27 and Sub-Regional Committee 2 was arrested by the military and police authorities in Lupon, Davao Oriental.
- March 15 – A 30-minute clash occurred in Bongabong, Oriental Mindoro between elements of the 4th Infantry Battalion and 30 NPA fighters. The clash resulted in 5 troopers dead and 4 wounded.
- March 16 – A NPA encampment in Agusan del Norte was captured by government forces after a series of gun battles which left 2 rebels killed and undetermined number of rebels wounded.
- March 17 – Nine explosions were believed to have been set off by the NPA in Masbate. Two police personnel were injured after one of the blasts struck their patrol vehicle.
- March 17 – An NPA rebel was killed and another was captured by government troops.
- March 17 – An NPA rebel was killed and a NPA unit vice-commander was captured after a clash between the 39th Infantry Battalion and the NPA's Guerilla Front 72.
- March 19 – A leader of the Milisya ng Bayan of the NPA and his 12 followers surrendered to the 1001st Infantry Battalion at Sitio Logpaton, Brgy. Kingking, Pantukan, Compostela Valley.
- March 28 – The Philippine Army pulled out some of its troops in Guihulngan, Negros Oriental, considered a stronghold of the NPA to boost the security forces in neighboring Canlaon after a series of shootings that killed 3 and injured another.
- March 28 – NPA rebels set up checkpoints in Prosperidad, Agusan del Sur and Hinatuan, Surigao del Sur.
- March 30 – Two soldiers were killed and 4 others are wounded in two separate skirmishes with NPA rebels in Agusan del Sur and Bukidnon.
- March 30 – A rebel was killed and another was captured after a firefight in Carranglan, Nueva Ecija.

=== April ===
- April 2 – Soldiers belonging to the 25th Infantry Battalion and police personnel from the Compostela Valley Police Provincial Public Safety Company (CVPPSC) engaged in a firefight with some 20 NPA rebels from Guerilla Front 27. The firefight resulted in 1 rebel killed and 12 high powered firearms recovered.
- April 2 – Two soldiers belonging to Special Task Force Masbate and 3 NPA Sparrow units clashed in a public market in Masbate City. One soldier and a Sparrow was wounded. Another Sparow was arrested.
- April 3 – NPA rebels temporarily barricaded highways in Bukidnon and Misamis Oriental at 5:00 am. The rebels left 20 minutes later.
- April 3 – Two policemen were abducted by the NPA in Impasugong, Bukidnon. Three policemen and 2 soldiers are now under the custody of different NPA units after they conducted 10 roadblocks in 3 provinces.
- April 5 – A Sangguniang Bayan candidate was killed by alleged NPA guerillas in Abra after he alleged refused to pay P20,000.00 permit-to-campaign fee imposed by the rebels.
- April 6 – A soldier was wounded in a clash between troops and NPA rebels in Paluan, Occidental Mindoro.
- April 7 – A militiaman was killed by NPA rebels in Matanao, Davao del Sur.
- April 8 – A 15-minute firefight erupted in Bukidnon between government troops and NPA rebels. Two soldiers and undetermined number of rebels were wounded.
- April 13 – Jones, Isabela Vice Mayor Ronaldo Lucas was killed by NPA rebels after he allegedly violated the rebels' agreement to campaign in the 2016 elections.
- April 15 – A squad of soldiers with CAFGU were involved in an encounter with NPA rebels in Libon, Albay. A member of the CAFGU Active Auxiliary was killed and another militiaman was wounded.
- April 16 – More than 60 NPA rebels overran a detachment of the 72nd Infantry Battalion in Paquibato district, Davao City and seized 19 high-powered firearms, ammunition and 4 grenades.
- April 16 – Two militias and 5 policemen were captured by NPA rebels after a series of raids in Davao City.
- April 17 – Five soldiers were seriously wounded after their vehicle was ambushed by the NPA in Samar.
- April 18 – A private warehouse in Valencia, Bukidnon was ransacked by NPA rebels. The NPA seized 1,384 sacks of rice and loaded them into four trucks. The operation was dubbed as "Operation Rice-Seizure".
- April 20 – An Army sergeant was shot dead by armed men believed to be members of the NPA.
- April 21 – A soldier was abducted by 30 armed men believed to be members of the NPA.
- April 25 – Five policemen who were abducted by the NPA rebels on April 16 were freed.

=== May ===
- May 1 – A soldier was shot and killed by suspected NPA members.
- May 2 – A high ranking commander of the NPA was captured by authorities at a checkpoint in Las Nieves, Agusan del Norte.
- May 6 – Suspected NPA rebels ambushed a group of supporters of mayoral candidate Vice Mayor Melanie Uy in Jones, Isabela. Three were killed while 4 were wounded.
- May 7 – A convoy was ambushed by NPA rebels in Gamay, Northern Samar, resulteding in 1 soldier dead and 4 others wounded.
- May 14 – Two soldiers were killed while 2 others were wounded in a clash with suspected NPA rebels in Toboso, Negros Occidental.
- May 19 – The NPA claimed responsibility for the killing of a retired policeman in Gingoog, Misamis Oriental.
- May 21 – Government forces seized a NPA encampment in Lopez, Quezon.
- May 22 – Suspected NPA rebels attacked a farm workers' bunkhouse in Sagay, Negros Occidental, resulting in 2 farmers killed and 2 others injured.
- May 23 – Two NPA rebels and 4 soldiers were wounded in a 2-hour firefight in Columbio, Sultan Kudarat.
- May 28 – A soldier was killed while 2 others were wounded in a firefight with NPA rebels in Escalante, Negros Occidental.
- May 29 – Suspected NPA rebels simultaneously attacked a municipal hall and a police headquarters in Davao Oriental. They also abducted the police chief of the police station.

=== June ===
- June 3 – The US Department of State re-designated the NPA in the list of foreign terrorist organizations.
- June 3 – Two police officers died while a civilian was wounded after 3 men believed to be NPA rebels ambushed the police officers in Bulan, Sorsogon.
- June 3 – Four suspected members of the NPA were arrested by authorities in Butuan, Agusan del Norte.
- June 5 – Four people were killed in a firefight between NPA rebels and paramilitaries in Bukidnon.
- June 6 – A top leader of the NPA was arrested in Claver, Surigao del Norte.
- June 9 – Four alleged high-ranking NPA members were arrested in Butuan.
- June 10 – Two soldiers were killed in an ambush by suspected members of the NPA in Davao Oriental.
- June 11 – Suspected NPA rebels killed 2 soldiers in Pilar, Sorsogon.
- June 15 – Suspected NPA rebels ambushed 5 policemen in Pio V. Corpuz, Masbate. One policeman was wounded.
- June 17 – A 20-minute firefight erupted in South Cotabato resulting in 2 NPA rebels killed.
- June 29 – A high-ranking NPA leader was arrested by authorities in Compostela Valley. Meanwhile, a female NPA leader was arrested in Siaton, Negros Oriental.
- June 30 – A reelected councilor was killed by 3 NPA rebels in Isabela, Negros Occidental.

=== July ===
- July 1 – An NPA commander and his aide were killed during a gunfight with the military in North Cotabato.
- July 5 – A policeman was abducted by 15 suspected NPA rebels in Carmen, Surigao del Sur.
- July 5 – A clash in Bayog, Zamboanga del Sur left 2 NPA rebels and a civilian military volunteer killed.
- July 9 – Three NPA fighters were killed after a clash with government forces near Mauban, Quezon.
- July 12 – A two-hour firefight near Atimonan, Quezon left one soldier and one NPA fighter dead and 5 soldiers injured.
- July 27 – One militia member was killed and 4 others were injured after an NPA ambush in Davao Del Norte, just two days after President Rodrigo Duterte declared a unilateral ceasefire.

=== August ===
- August 5 – A group of 40 suspected NPA members in Apayao burned three trucks belonging to a company which refused to pay protection money.
- August 6 – An elite soldier from the Philippine Army was killed during a clash in Bukidnon, with the NPA suffering an unknown number of casualties.
- August 9 – The Communist Party of the Philippines issued a statement, ordering the NPA to intensify its attacks in the countryside, despite peace talks with the government being weeks away.
- August 19 – Three militiamen were wounded after NPA fighters 'harassed' their detachment near Laiya Aplaya, San Juan, Batangas.
- August 19 – Four NPA members were killed after an attempted ambush near San Luis, Agusan del Sur.
- August 20 – The ceasefire between government forces and the CPP-NPA took effect across the country, with troops returning to barracks and combat operations ceasing.
- August 26 – Rebels released a police officer from Tandag, Surigao del Sur who had been abducted on July 5.
