= Last battle on British soil =

Designation in British historiography

There are several contenders for the title of last battle on British or English soil, depending largely on how one defines battle and how one classifies various events.

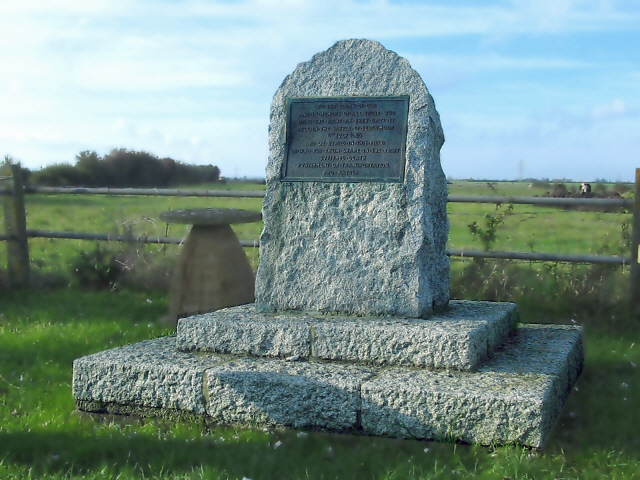
A memorial stone to the Battle of Sedgemoor, one of the contenders for the last battle on English soil

Below is a chronological list of events that different sources cite as the last battle on British or English soil or a related title:

- Battle of Sedgemoor, Somerset, England, 6 July 1685. The final battle of the Monmouth Rebellion, is often cited as the last battle on English soil. The local museum makes the lesser claim that it was the last "major battle" on English soil "when Englishmen took up arms against fellow Englishmen."
- Battle of Preston, Lancashire, England, 9–14 November 1715. Fought during the Jacobite Rising of 1715, it is claimed by some sources to be the last major battle to be fought on English soil; other authors regard it as a siege rather than a battle.
- Clifton Moor Skirmish, Westmorland (now Cumbria), England, 18 December 1745. Also known as "The Battle of Clifton Moor", this was the last action of the Jacobite rising of 1745 to take place in England, and the last time English and Scottish armies clashed on English soil, but it is debated whether this counts as a full battle or just a "skirmish".
- Battle of Culloden, Scotland, 16 April 1746. The final confrontation of the Jacobite rising of 1745, this was the last large scale pitched battle fought on British soil, and in many sources the last battle of any sort fought in Great Britain.
- Battle of Fishguard, Wales, 22–24 February 1797. The most recent intentional landing on British soil by a hostile foreign force, and thus is often referred to as the "last invasion of Britain".
- Battle of Bossenden Wood, Kent, England, 31 May 1838. The battle, if it was such—some sources refer to it as an "armed rising"—was fought between a small group of labourers from the local area and a detachment of soldiers sent from Canterbury to arrest the labourers' leader.
- Battle of Graveney Marsh, Kent, England, 27 September 1940. The last ground engagement involving a foreign force to take place on the mainland of Great Britain, was an encounter between the crew of a downed German aircraft and British soldiers training nearby.

== See also ==
- Battle of Bamber Bridge, a racially-charged armed confrontation between US troops in 1943.
- Battle of Britain, an air battle over the south east of the United Kingdom during World War II.
- Battle of George Square – 1919 violent confrontation in Glasgow, Scotland
- Battle of Orgreave, a 1984 confrontation between South Yorkshire Police and striking miners.
- Battle of the Beanfield, a 1985 confrontation between Wiltshire Police and New Age travellers.
- List of wars involving the United Kingdom
