= Lists of battles =

Lists of battles contain links to sets of articles on battles. They may be organized alphabetically, by era, by conflict, by participants or location, or by death toll. See Category:Battles for a complete list of articles on battles.

== Alphabetical list ==
- List of battles (alphabetical)

== Chronological ==
=== By era ===
- List of battles before 301
- List of battles 301–1300
- List of battles 1301–1600
- List of battles 1601–1800
- List of battles 1801–1900
- List of battles 1901–2000
- List of battles in the 21st century

=== By war ===
- List of battles of the Eighty Years' War (1566–1648)
- List of battles of the Thirty Years' War (1618–1648)
- List of military engagements of the English Civil War (1642–1651)
- Lists of battles of the French Revolutionary Wars and Napoleonic Wars (1792–1815)
- List of American Civil War battles (1861–1865)
- List of costliest American Civil War land battles
- List of naval battles of the American Civil War
- List of military engagements of World War I (1914–1918)
- List of World War II battles (1939–1945)
- Lists of allied military operations of the Vietnam War (1955–1975)
- List of military engagements during the Russian invasion of Ukraine (2022–present)
- List of military engagements during the Gaza war (2023–2025)

== By death toll ==
- List of battles by casualties

== By geographic location ==
- List of battles by geographic location
  - Lists of battles fought in Africa (see also List of conflicts in Africa)
    - List of battles in South Africa
  - Lists of battles fought in the Americas
    - Lists of battles fought in U.S. states (see also Category:Battles in the United States by state or territory):
  - List of conflicts in Australia
  - Lists of battles fought in Europe (see also List of conflicts in Europe)
    - Last battle on British soil
    - List of wars in the Low Countries until 1560
    - List of wars in the southern Low Countries (1560–1829)
  - List of conflicts in the Middle East

== By participant ==
=== By state participant ===
- List of Byzantine battles
- List of Chinese battles
- List of battles involving France (disambiguation)
- List of Georgian battles
- List of battles won by indigenous peoples of the Americas
- List of Japanese battles
- List of Korean battles
- Wars and battles involving Prussia
- List of Roman battles
- List of battles involving the Sikh Empire
- List of battles involving the Kingdom of Scotland
- List of Swedish battles
- List of battles with most United States military fatalities
- List of battles involving the Republic of Venice

=== By participating commander ===
- List of Ottoman battles in which the sultan participated
- Military career of Napoleon § Battle record summary
- Military career of George Washington § Summaries of Washington's Revolutionary War battles

== By type ==
Battles are generally presumed to have been land/field battles, unless otherwise stated.

- Lists of aerial operations and battles
  - Air raids on Australia, 1942–1943
  - Air raids on Hong Kong during WWII
  - Aircraft carrier operations during World War II
  - List of air operations during the Battle of Europe
    - List of Allied attacks on the German battleship Tirpitz
    - List of strategic bombing over Germany in World War II
    - List of strategic bombing over the United Kingdom in World War II
- List of amphibious assault operations
- List of military operations on ice
- List of naval battles
  - List of naval and land-based operations in the Pacific Theater during World War II
- List of sieges

== See also ==
- List of orders of battle
  - List of number of conflicts per year
  - List of wars by death toll
- Africa :
  - List of conflicts in Africa (Military history of Africa)
    - List of modern conflicts in North Africa (Maghreb)
    - Conflicts in the Horn of Africa (East region)
- Americas :
  - List of conflicts in North America
  - List of conflicts in Central America
  - List of conflicts in South America
- Asia :
  - List of conflicts in Asia
  - List of conflicts in the Near East
  - List of conflicts in the Middle East
    - List of modern conflicts in the Middle East
- Europe :
  - List of conflicts in Europe
    - Post-Cold War European conflicts
- Oceania :
  - List of conflicts in Australia
- Ongoing conflicts around the World :
  - List of ongoing armed conflicts
    - Ongoing military conflicts

== External links and references ==
- World History Database, Alphabetic Listing of Battles Index of World battles. Archived from the original.
- Radford, Robert, Great Historical Battles. An extensive list of important battles and influential leaders, from -490 BC to present times.
- Winstanley, M.A., Every Battle in History. A List of every recorded battle and commander in world history (~12000 Battles, ~5000 Commanders).
