= Casualties of the Iraqi insurgency (2011–present) =

Casualties of the Iraqi insurgency (2011–present) refers to deaths and injuries in Iraq after the withdrawal of US forces at the end of the Iraq War on 18 December 2011, as fighting continued between the Iraqi government and anti-government forces in the Iraqi insurgency (2011–2013) and later escalated into the War in Iraq (2014–2017) and subsequent Iraqi insurgency (2017–present).

== Casualty statistics ==
=== Iraq Body Count ===
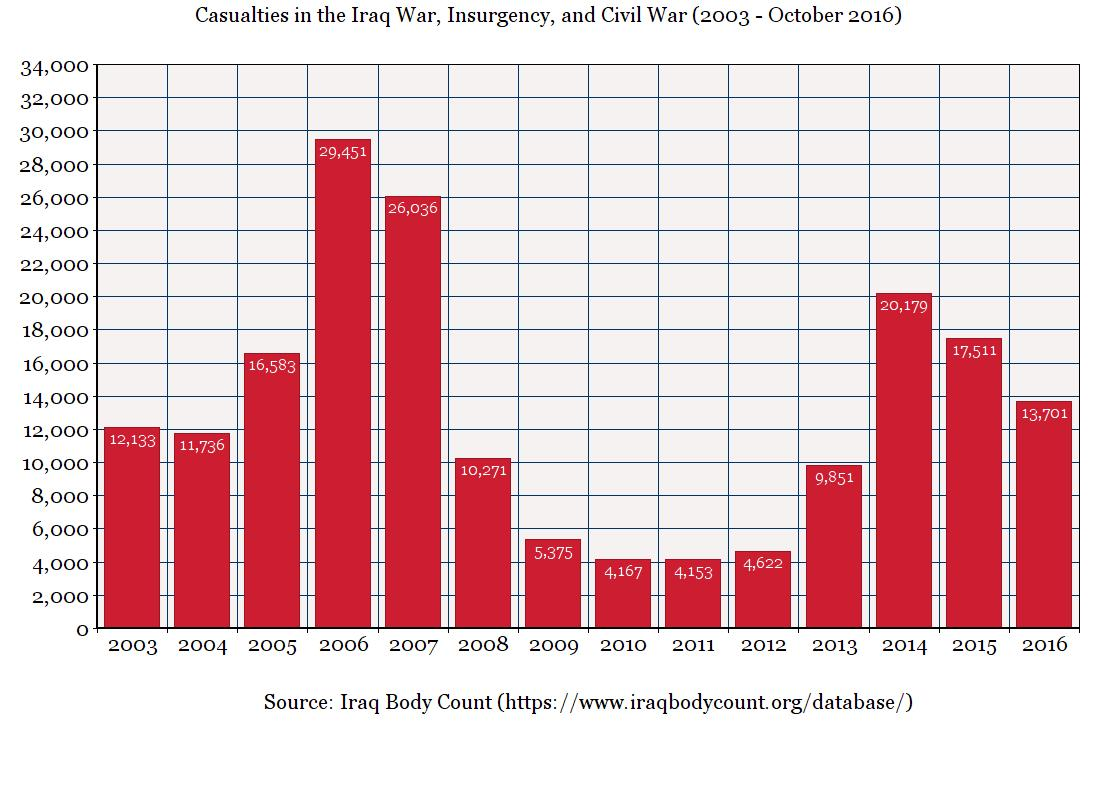
Casualties in the Iraq War, Insurgency, and Civil War (2003 – October 2016)

An independent UK/US group, the Iraq Body Count project (IBC) compiles documented (not estimated) Iraqi civilian deaths from violence since the invasion of Iraq in 2003, including those caused directly by US-led coalition and Iraqi government forces and paramilitary or criminal attacks by others. It shows a total range of at least 175,792 to 196,572 civilian deaths in the whole conflict from March 2003 to June 2017.

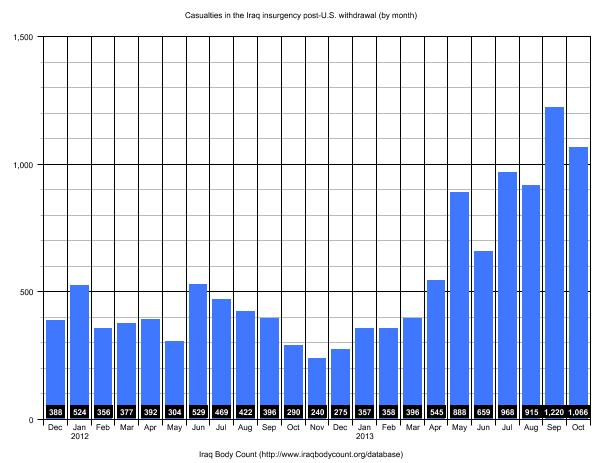
Month by month casualty tolls in the 2 years after the U.S. withdrawal (IBC database)

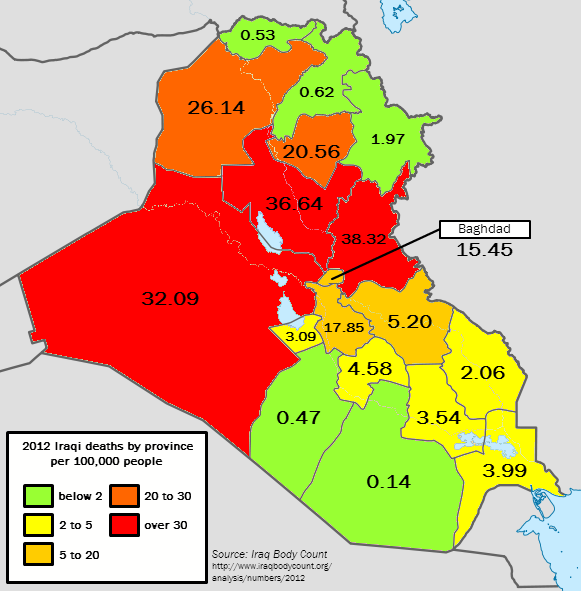
2012 Iraqi deaths by province, per 100,000 people

Following are the monthly IBC Project civilian death totals, from the US pullout in December 2011 onwards.

Iraqi civilians killed from December 2011 according to IBC
Year	Month												Total
Year	Jan	Feb	Mar	Apr	May	Jun	Jul	Aug	Sep	Oct	Nov	Dec	Total
2011												392	4,153
2012	531	356	377	392	304	529	469	422	400	290	253	299	4,622
2013	357	360	403	545	888	659	1145	1013	1,306	1180	870	1,126	9,852
2014	1,097	972	1,029	1,037	1,100	4,088	1,580	3,340	1,474	1,738	1,436	1,327	20,218
2015	1,490	1,625	1,105	2,013	1,295	1,355	1,845	1,991	1,445	1,297	1,021	1,096	17,578
2016	1,374	1,258	1,459	1,192	1,276	1,405	1,280	1,375	935	1,970	1,738	1,131	16,393
2017	1,119	982	1,918	1,816	1,871	1,858	1,498	597	490	397	346	291	13,183
2018	474	410	402	303	229	209	230	201	241	310	160	155	3,319
2019	323	271	123	140	166	130	145	93	151	361	274	215	2,392

The numbers include only civilians. The IBC includes non-paramilitary police forces as civilians, and members of the Iraqi Army or paramilitary/militia forces when the death is a result of summary execution after capture. The IBC does a constant check on all its reports, and publishes weekly updates to its monthly casualty table. Consequently, the figures for the last few months in the table above should always be considered preliminary and will be marked in italic until confirmed by IBC.

According to IBC, of the 17,049 civilians recorded killed in 2014 (a figure it later revised upwards), 4,325 were killed by ISIL, 1,748 by Iraqi military airstrikes and 118 by US-coalition airstrikes. A further 10,858 civilians were reported killed by unidentified actors. Of the 16,115 civilians recorded killed in 2015, 8,347 were killed by execution (the killing of captives) and 1,295 by airstrikes; 8,818 civilian deaths involved ISIL and 1,492 involved Iraqi government forces.

Besides continuously updating documented civilian deaths from violence, from time to time IBC also puts out estimates of combatants killed (including Iraqi military and insurgent groups): at the end of 2014, it estimated a lower range of 4,000-5,000 combatants killed in 2014 (based on AFP and official statistics released by Iraqi government ministries) and a higher range of 30,000 combatants killed (based on aggregated media reports), concluding that "the truth probably lies somewhere between these two numbers". At the end of 2015, IBC estimated that, between June 2014 and December 2015, over 4,000 Iraqi soldiers and allied militia were killed, as well as over 1,500 Peshmerga and Kurdish security force members and some 13,000 ISIS fighters. It put the total death toll for insurgents, Iraqi soldiers and other combatants killed in the period 2010–2015 at 24,340.

=== Iraqi government figures ===
The Iraqi government releases its own figures, usually on the first day of each month. These are almost always significantly lower than other estimates and often even contradict with news reports, leading to an apparent "under-reporting" of casualty figures, although after the escalation of violence in the summer of 2013 the casualty tolls began to "catch up" with independent estimates. Most news outlets still report on these, and JustPolicy.org has a running estimate based on the Lancet study with the rate of increase derived from the Iraq Body Count.

A running tally of all the figures can be found at Google Docs, courtesy of Agence France-Presse. The numbers include civilians, as well as members of the Iraqi Army and police forces.

The Iraqi government also compiles the number of wounded from these three categories, as well as the number of killed and captured insurgents. From the beginning of December 2011 until the end of March 2014, at least 19,829 Iraqis have been injured according to these reports, including 2,688 police officers and 2,319 members of the Iraqi Army. During the same period, 1,350 insurgents were killed, while a total of 4,403 suspects were arrested.

Iraqi civilians, police and army members killed according to the Iraqi government
Year	Month												Total
Year	Jan	Feb	Mar	Apr	May	Jun	Jul	Aug	Sep	Oct	Nov	Dec	Total
2011												155	155
2012	151	150	112	126	132	131	325	164	365	144	166	208	2,174
2013	177	136	163	205	630	240	921	356	885	964	948	897	6,522
2014	1013	790	1004	1009	938	1922	1669	1648	1238	1725	1315	1267	15,538
2015	1408												

=== United Nations figures ===
The United Nations Assistance Mission for Iraq (UNAMI) keeps its own statistics on casualties. They include killed and injured civilians (including police) and killed and injured members of Iraqi Security Forces (including Peshmerga and militias fighting alongside the Iraqi Army). They don't include anti-government insurgents. UNAMI warns that it may be under-reporting casualties and that the figures it provides "have to be considered as the absolute minimum".

Iraqi civilians killed according to UNAMI
Year	Month												Total
Year	Jan	Feb	Mar	Apr	May	Jun	Jul	Aug	Sep	Oct	Nov	Dec	Total
2012											445	230	
2013	319	418	229	595	963	685	928	716	887	852	565	661	7,818
2014	618	564	484	610	603	1531	1186	1265	854	856	936	680	12,282
2015	790	611	729	535	665	665	844	585	537	559	489	506	7,515
2016	490	410	575	410	468	382	629	473	609	1,120	926		6,492

According to UNAMI, the total number of civilian casualties (killed and injured) in 2013 (including police) was 25,799 (7,818 killed and 17,981 injured).

According to UNAMI, the total number of civilian casualties (killed and injured) in 2014 (including police) was 35,408 (12,282 killed and 23,126 injured).

According to UNAMI, the total number of civilian casualties (killed and injured) in 2015 (including police) was 22,370 (7,515 killed and 14,855 injured).

Iraqi Security Forces killed according to UNAMI
Year	Month												Total
Year	Jan	Feb	Mar	Apr	May	Jun	Jul	Aug	Sep	Oct	Nov	Dec	Total
2014	115	139	108	140	196	886	551	155	265	417	296	421	3,689
2015	585	492	268	277	366	801	488	740	180	155	399	474	5,225
2016	359	260	544	331	399	280	130	218	394	672	1,959		5,546

== Other reports ==
=== Antiwar.com ===
Antiwar.com compiles monthly and yearly casualty figures from news reports. Figures include civilians, security personnel and insurgents.

In July 2014, according to Antiwar.com, 5,698 people were killed, including 3,961 insurgents. The rest were civilians and security forces. For the following month, Antiwar.com reported 1,642 civilians and security forces and 3,112 militants died. In September, per Antiwar.com, 1,158 civilians and security forces were killed, along with 2,632 militants. Finally, in October, 1,572 civilians and security forces died, in addition to 4,990 militants, as reported by Antiwar.com.

For the whole 2014, Antiwar.com estimated a total of 48,590 killed (16,229 civilian and security deaths, plus 30,634 militant deaths) and 26,516 wounded.

In 2015, 52,045 people were killed across Iraq according to Antiwar.com: the number of civilians and security personnel killed was 14,571, whereas militants lost 37,474 fighters.

=== US-led coalition air-strike casualties ===
Since 8 August 2014, the USA has resumed airstrikes against ISIL targets in support of the Iraqi government, together with a growing coalition of allies (comprising Australia, Belgium, Canada, Denmark, France, Jordan, The Netherlands, and UK). According to Iraq Body Count, 118 civilians were killed by coalition airstrikes in 2014 and 845 in 2015. According to "Airwars", a team of independent journalists, between 393 and 571 civilians were killed by coalition airstrikes in 54 incidents in Iraq between 8 August 2014 and 31 December 2015; other incidents with hundreds more civilian fatalities were also recorded by Airwars, but the US-led coalition's responsibility couldn't be confirmed with equal confidence in those cases.

== Month by month ==
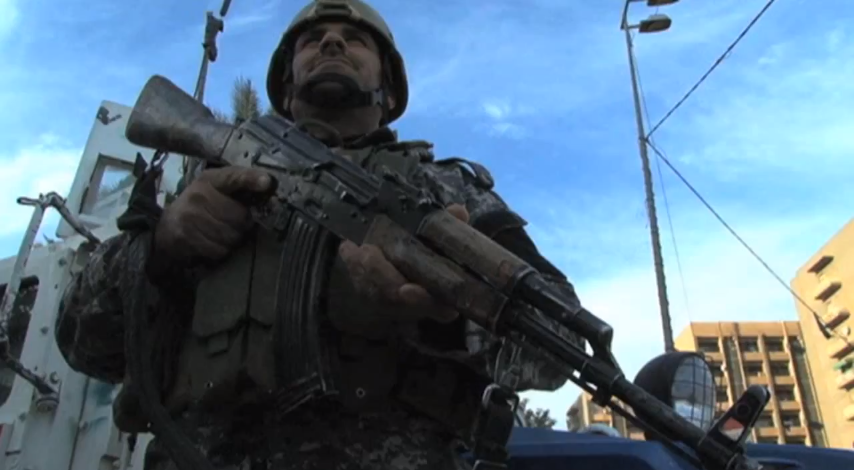
Iraqi soldier standing guard in Baghdad, 26 December 2011

- This section includes both AFP and Iraqi government estimates, and as such, is intended as an addition to the tables above.

Several dozen were killed within the first few days after U.S. withdrawal on 18 December 2011. At least 337 casualties were inflicted by the wave of violence during 20–26 December. About 200 died in January, with Al-Arabiya channel claiming mortal casualties to be at least 151 people. The Iraqi Body Count (IBC) claimed 451 casualties in January, including injuries. In February, the death toll across Iraq reached 278 according to IBC. 74 people were killed between 1–8 March according to IBC, and a total of 112 were killed in Iraq in March, according to government figures. At least 126 Iraqis were killed in April, while 132 Iraqis were killed in sectarian violence in Iraq in May 2012. June marked a significant spike in violence, with a major attack occurring on average every three days. At least 237 were killed during the month, with an additional 603 people left injured.

July 2012 was the deadliest month in Iraq since August 2010, with 325 deaths; 241 civilians, 40 police, and 44 soldiers. The month also saw 697 people being wounded by violence; 480 civilians, 122 police, and 95 soldiers. The rise in violence was linked to Sunni insurgents trying to undermine the Shia led government. According to government figures, at least 164 Iraqis were killed during August 2012 – 90 civilians, 39 soldiers and 35 policemen, with 260 others injured. September was a particularly bloody month, with government reports citing at least 365 deaths (182 civilians, 95 soldiers and 88 policemen) and 683 injuries (453 civilians, 120 soldiers and 110 police). Government casualty tolls released for the month of October showed a total of 144 people were killed (88 civilians, 31 policemen and 25 soldiers), and another 264 were wounded, including 110 civilians, 92 policemen and 62 soldiers. At least 166 people were killed throughout Iraq in November 2012 according to government casualty tolls, and 208 died in December, including 55 policemen and 28 soldiers. During January 2013, at least 246 people were killed nationwide (including 30 policemen and 18 soldiers), while 735 others were injured. Government figures remained low in February 2013, with a total of 136 killed (88 civilians, 22 soldiers and 26 policemen) and 228 injured. There was a slight increase in March, when according to government sources 163 were killed and 256 injured nationwide, though officials in Baghdad stressed that these numbers did not include the Kurdish regions.

According to figures released by the UN Assistance Mission for Iraq (UNAMI), April 2013 was the deadliest month in Iraq in over five years, with a total of 712 people were killed and 1,633 were wounded in acts of terrorism and violence. Conditions continued to deteriorate in May when UNAMI reported a total of 1,045 Iraqis were killed and another 2,397 wounded in acts of terrorism and acts of violence, making it one of the deadliest months on record. The figures include 963 civilians and 181 civilian police killed, while 2,191 civilians and 359 civilian police were wounded. An additional 82 members of the Iraqi Security Forces were killed and 206 were injured.

== See also ==
- Casualties of the Iraq War
- Iraq Body Count project
