= Abet, Nigeria =

Abet A̠bet Gidan Jatau
- Village
- Location within Nigeria
- Coordinates: 09°41′25″N 08°10′30″E
- Country: Nigeria
- State: Kaduna State
- LGA: Zangon Kataf
- Elevation: 764 m (2,507 ft)
- Time zone: UTC+01:00 (WAT)
- Postal code: 802128
- Climate: Aw

Abet is a village community in Zangon Kataf Local Government Area, southern Kaduna state in the Middle Belt region of Nigeria, which lies on the central Nigeria plateau.

The postal code for the village is 802128. The area has an altitude of about 764 metres (2,507 feet) and a population of about 8,046. The nearest airport to the community is the Yakubu Gowon Airport, Jos, located 41 nmi (47 mi) E.

== Hamlets ==
Abet is a village area encompassing several smaller populated areas, including Abet, Achin, Angwan Jatau, Kumi Rural, and Marabang.

== See also ==
- List of villages in Kaduna State
