= List of military operations on ice =

Battles and other military operations that took place on lake or sea ice include:

- about 530 – Battle on the Ice of Lake Vänern, recorded in Norse sagas and referred to in the Anglo-Saxon epic Beowulf
- 1241 - Battle of Mohi on the Sajo River
- 1242 – Battle on the Ice on Lake Peipus
- 1270 – Battle of Karuse on the frozen Baltic Sea between the Island of Muhu and the mainland
- 1520 – Battle of Bogesund on lake Åsunden
- 1658 – March Across the Belts, Charles X Gustav's march over the Little Belt and the Great Belt during the Second Northern War
- 1795 – Capture of the Dutch fleet at Den Helder: The French First Republic's cavalry captured the fleet of the Dutch Republic that was stuck in ice, frozen at anchor.
- 1809 – Finnish War
  - Barclay de Tolly's advance from Vaasa to Uumaja in Sweden, see Battle of Ratan and Sävar
  - Bagration's and Kulnev's attack from Åland to Grisslehamn in Sweden
- 1921 - The crushing of the Kronstadt rebellion over the gulf of Finland as part of the Russian Civil War
- 1940 – Battle of Vyborg Bay (1940) in the Winter War
- 1941-44 - Road of Life, an ice road over Lake Ladoga that supplied the besieged Leningrad during the winter months (barges kept the supply line open in warmer times), during World War II.
- 1942 – Battle of Suursaari in the Continuation War
