= Batwa–Luba clashes =

Ethnic clashes in Congo (2013–2018)

- Part of Katanga insurgency
- Location of Tanganyika Province in the Democratic Republic of the Congo
Date	c. 2013–2018
Location	Tanganyika, Democratic Republic of the Congo

Belligerents
Pygmy batwa militias; "Perci"; Mai-Mai "Hapa na pale"	Luba militias; "Elements"

Commanders and leaders
"Liwa"; "Kabeke"; "Kahimbi"; Philippe Kahengele	Unknown

Casualties and losses
- 1,410 killed, 650,000 displaced

The Batwa–Luba clashes were a series of clashes in the Democratic Republic of the Congo (DRC) between the Pygmy Batwa people, (Note: The two major divisions of Pygmies in the DRC are the Bambuti, or Mbuti, who largely live in the Ituri forest in the northeast, and the Batwa, but many Batwa in certain areas of the country also refer to themselves as Bambuti.) and the Luba people that began in 2013 and ended in 2018.

== Background ==
The pygmy Batwa, regionally also called Bambuti or Bambote, are often exploited and allegedly enslaved by the Luba and other Bantu groups. While the pygmies never organized militarily to resist previously, starting with the First Congo War, rebel leader Laurent-Désiré Kabila, who won the war, organized the Twa into paramilitary groups to help him. His son, Joseph Kabila, who succeeded him, used these militias in the Second Congo War and against the predominantly Luba Mai-Mai Kata Katanga.

== Course of the conflict ==
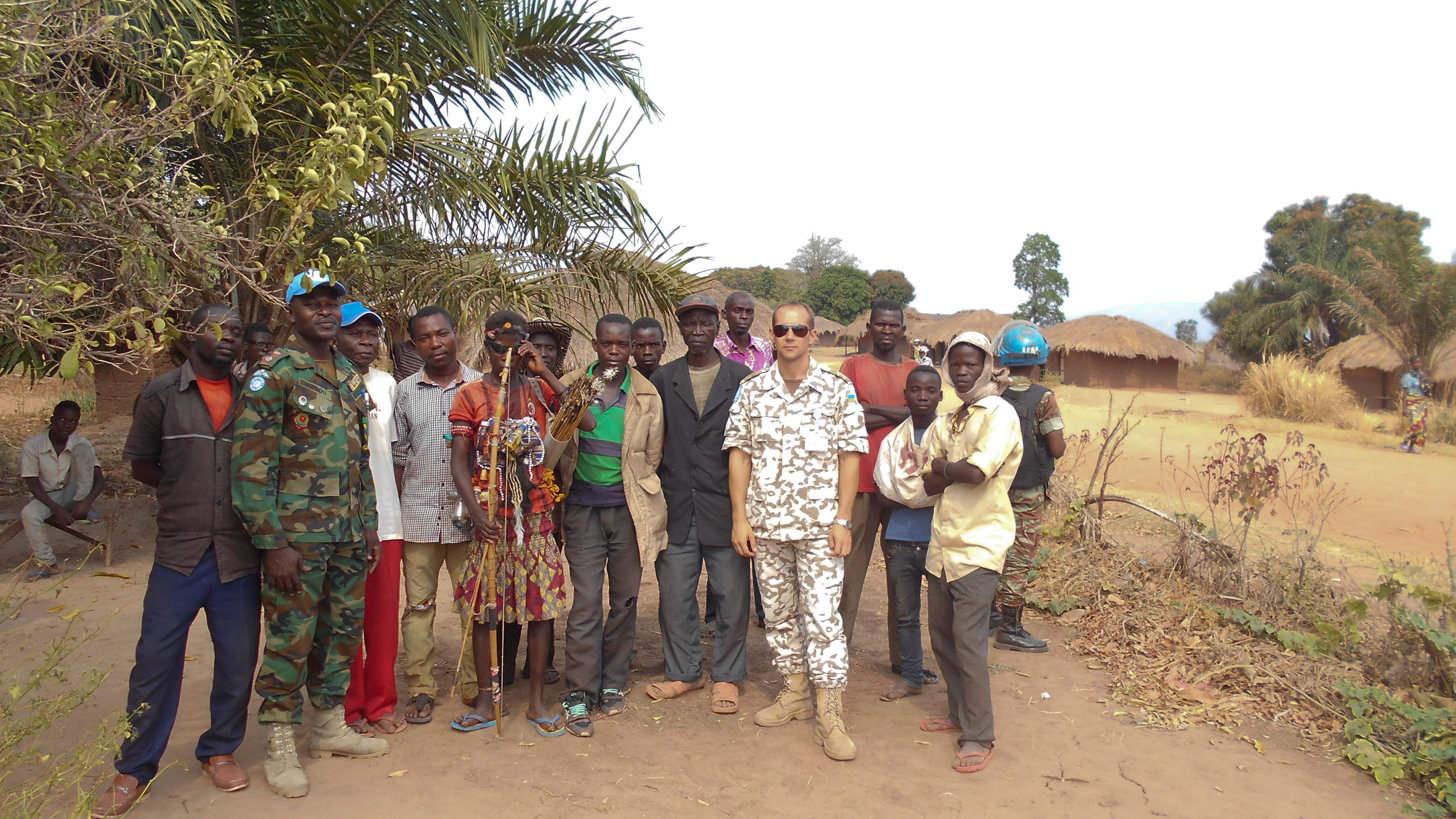
Bantu militiamen with MONUSCO observers, Mulonge, Kalemie Territory, 2017.

In Tanganyika Province, in the northern part of the former Katanga Province, starting in 2013, Pygmy Batwa rose up into militias, such as the "Perci" militia, and attacked Luba villages. In Nyunzu Territory, the pygmy hunter-gatherers organized into militias for the first time in known history. A Luba militia known as "Elements" attacked back, notably killing at least 30 people in the "Vumilia 1" displaced people camp in April 2015. Since the start of the conflict, hundreds have been killed and tens of thousands have been displaced from their homes. The weapons used in the conflict are often arrows, axes, and machetes, rather than guns.

In October 2015, Pygmy and Luba leaders signed a peace deal to end the conflict. In September 2016, the United Nations along with provincial authorities established local councils called "baraza" to address grievances and this appeared to reduce the violence. However, clashes intensified at the end of 2016, as the government tried to enforce a tax on caterpillars that the Batwa harvest as a major source of income to sell as a delicacy around the capital Kinshasa, while the military attempted to arrest a Twa warlord. Both of these events led to a violent backlash and a spread of the fighting. Twa militias also started to target Tutsis, another Bantu group, by slaughtering their cows.

In January 2017, clashes between Twa and Bantu militias took place at the villages of Mpyana and Kakelwa in Manono Territory. A ceasefire brokered by the United Nations in February 2017 failed, and the violence continued. The International Rescue Committee said more than 400 villages were destroyed between July 2016 and March 2017. In August 2017, the clashes intensified after Batwa attacked a group of Luba near Kalemie; in course of the following fighting about 50 people died, most of them Luba. Batwa fighters also attacked a MONUSCO convoy with arrows. A number of Blue Helmets were wounded, though they still opted not to return fire. In October 2017, a militia called "Mai-Mai Hapa na pale" occupied Lengwe in Nyunzu Territory; the group reportedly cooperated with Twa militias and recruited both Twa as well as Bantu BaKalanga.

By the end of 2017, the economy in Tanganyika had mostly collapsed, while fields could no longer be harvested. As result, malnutrition spread amongst those who had fled, as well as those who stayed at their homes. However, open fighting had largely ceased by early 2018, although both sides still treated each other with mistrust.

== Casualties ==
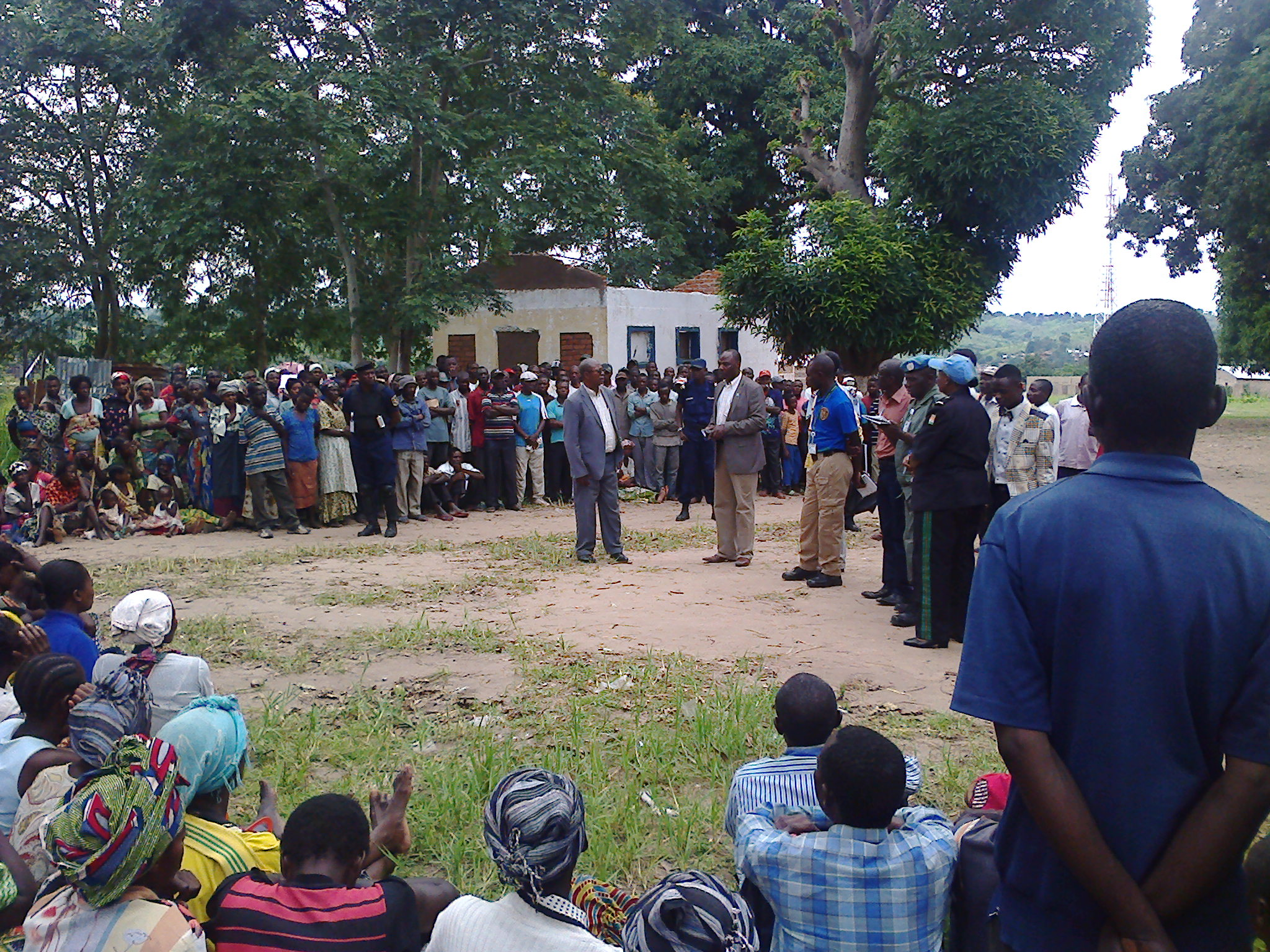
IDPs from Nyunzu Territory who have fled the clashes between Batwa and Luba.

=== Deaths ===
More than a thousand people were killed in the first eight months of 2014 alone.

=== Displaced people ===
The number of displaced people are estimated to be 650,000 as of December 2017. Around March 2017, 543,000 had fled, up from 370,000 in December 2016, the strongest growth of the current conflicts in the Congo, which has the largest population of displaced people in Africa. Many refugees are allegedly forced by the government to leave the camps and return to their homes, where the fighting still continues.

== Aftermath ==
On 5 June 2020, the National Assembly passed a bill to recognize the rights of indigenous peoples, including the Batwa.

A low-level conflict continued even after the Batwa–Luba clashes had largely ceased, with some Twa militant groups continuing to attack settlements and security forces over the next years. These included the Twa militias led by "Liwa", "Kabeke", and "Kahimbi". "Mai-Mai Hapa na pale" also remained active, though a Twa sub-unit commanded by Philippe Kahengele surrendered to security forces in 2021. Communal tensions continued to erupt into armed confrontations from time to time, with clashes taking place in April and May 2023. In February 2024, "Mai-Mai Hapa na pale" leader Amuri Kasongo (alias "Cinq-cinq") was killed by the FARDC during a failed raid on the Luliya mining site.

By 2025, at least one armed Twa faction remained active and still fought Congolese security forces. This group had allied itself with Mai Mai Kata Katanga.
