= Uppsala Conflict Data Program =

Data collection program of Uppsala University

Coordinates: 59.858776°N 17.636600°E

- Abbreviation: UCDP
- Founded at: Uppsala, Sweden
- Parent organization: Department of Peace and Conflict Research, at Uppsala University
- Staff: Approximately 15 research assistants and researchers
- Website: UCDP

The Uppsala Conflict Data Program (UCDP) is a data collection program on organized violence, based at Uppsala University in Sweden. The UCDP is a leading provider of data on organized violence and armed conflict, and it is the oldest ongoing data collection project for civil war, with a history of almost 40 years. UCDP data are systematically collected and have global coverage, comparability across cases and countries, and long time series. Data is updated annually and are publicly available, free of charge. Furthermore, preliminary data on events of organized violence in Africa is released on a monthly basis.

The UCDP's data is published annually in the Journal of Peace Research. The UCDP also makes its data publicly available through its interactive website, UCDP website.

== Background ==
The UCDP began recording information on ongoing violent conflicts in the 1980s. It became clear that more systematic and global data on armed conflicts was necessary for conducting research in the expanding academic discipline of peace and conflict studies.

Initially, the program collected data only on so-called "armed conflicts", defined as fighting exceeding 25 battle-related deaths between two actors of which at least one was a state. In later years, the data collection grew, and the program began collecting data on "non-state conflicts" (where neither actor is a state) and "one-sided violence" (where an organized actor attacks unarmed civilians).

One of the leading researchers associated with the UCDP is Professor Peter Wallensteen that founded and led the program since its initiation until 31 July 2015. After this Wallensteen continued to serve as a Senior Advisor for the UCDP.

== Organization ==
The UCDP is based at the Department of Peace and Conflict Research of Uppsala University in Sweden. The program is led by Associate Professor Magnus Öberg, and employs approximately 10 to 15 research assistants and researchers. A number of scholars and Ph.D. candidates are also affiliated with the program. In addition to collecting data, the program disseminates knowledge on trends and dynamics of armed conflict to the public via lectures at academic and government forums, as well as through participating in conferences and exhibitions such as the Swedish Forum for Human Rights.

== Cooperation ==
UCDP is part of several important collaborations, for instance the extensive and well-established collaborations with the Peace Research Institute Oslo (PRIO) in Norway. Additionally, UCDP works closely with the Violence Early-Warning System (ViEWS) project at Uppsala University, Sweden, as well as with Varieties of Democracy (V-Dem) and the Quality of Government Institute (QoG), both based at the University of Gothenburg, Sweden. UCDP was part of the European Network for Conflict Research (ENCoRE), a network funded by Cooperation in Science and Technology (COST) of the European Union, which included all the leading research institutes in Europe that conduct quantitative and data driven research on armed conflict. UCDP also had a long-standing cooperation with the Human Security Report Project (HSRP) in Vancouver, Canada during the years that the project was running.

== Use cases ==
Hundreds of scholars have used the UCDP's data for research. Aside from being widely used in research on peace and conflict at universities both in Sweden and abroad, UCDP data is also used in a number of other disciplines, including public health, business and economics, migration and diasporas, as well as in studies that focus on agriculture, biodiversity and fisheries to name a few examples.

UCDP is prominently used by the United Nations, and serves as a main data source in high profile reports by organizations in the UN family including UN/WB, the World Bank, and the Food and Agriculture Organization (FAO). UCDP data is an integral part of the World Bank’s World Development Indicators, where it is the only indicator for measuring armed conflict and its levels of intensity, and the Global Burden of Disease (GBD) program. The data is used by numerous Swedish and foreign government agencies and by many international NGOs, e.g. Save the Children International, Small Arms Survey and GapMinder. UCDP data are included in the Global Peace Index of the Institute for Economics and Peace, and the Mo Ibrahim Foundation makes use of UCDP data for its index that assesses the quality of governance in African countries.

UCDP data is frequently used by journalists. Some of the largest media outlets in Sweden recurrently interview UCDP staff, and UCDP data is regularly published in, among others, Dagens Nyheter, Svenska Dagbladet, and the main Swedish radio broadcaster, Sveriges Radio. In addition, UCDP is often used and referred to in international media regarding armed conflicts and organized violence, for instance in the BBC, The Guardian, and The Washington Post, as well as in some of the major international news agencies, such as Agence France-Presse (AFP) and Reuters. In 2016, UCDP was listed by The Guardian as one of the top ten best sources of data for international development research, among such sources as the UNDP’s Human Development Index and the International Monetary Fund’s data site and reports.

== Publications ==
Since 1993, a list of all armed conflicts and a brief description of the major developments and trends in organized violence appears annually in the Journal of Peace Research. UCDP data was published in the SIPRI Yearbook in 1988-2017, and data on non-state conflicts appeared in the Human Security Report in 2004-2013. Data are also disseminated via the UCDP website.

== Encyclopedia ==
UCDP operates and continuously updates its online database (UCDP Conflict Encyclopedia), an interactive database, that offers a web-based system for visualizing, handling and downloading data on armed conflicts and organized violence, free of charge. The website offers information on several aspects of armed conflict such as conflict dynamics, groups, actors, third party involvement, and conflict resolution and peace agreements. It is possible to find information about specific countries, conflicts and years of interest by using the intuitive world maps. A user can download ready-made datasets on organized violence and peacemaking from the UCDP Dataset Download Center, as well as customized data selections of the user´s choice. There is also a public API where users can access UCDP data in a machine-readable format.

== Organized violence definitions ==
The program divides armed conflict into three categories: "state-based conflict", "non-state conflict", and "one-sided violence".

State-based conflict refers to what most people intuitively perceive as "war"; fighting either between two states, or between a state and a rebel group that challenges it. The UCDP defines an armed state-based conflict as: "An armed conflict is a contested incompatibility that concerns government and/or territory where the use of armed force between two parties, of which at least one is the government of a state, results in at least 25 battle-related deaths in one calendar year".

The program's definition differs somewhat from other data collection programs, such as the Correlates of War Project, which only counts conflicts where at least 1 000 deaths have been recorded during one calendar year. In UCDP, an armed conflict of this magnitude is labelled as having the intensity level of "war", whilst armed conflicts that reap between 25 and 999 battle-related deaths are seen as having the intensity of a "minor" armed conflict.

Non-state conflicts are those conflicts in which none of the warring parties is a state. Examples of non-state conflicts include the Fatah–Hamas conflict, inter-ethnic group conflicts such as the Lou Nuer–Murle conflict, and inter-cartel violence in the Mexican drug war.

One-sided violence is defined as: "The use of armed force by the government of a state or by a formally organized group against civilians which results in at least 25 deaths in a year”. Examples include actions by the governments of Sudan, Myanmar, and Syria against civilians, as well as actions of non-state organizations such as Los Zetas, al-Qaeda, and the Lord's Resistance Army against civilians.

== Datasets ==
=== Collection ===
UCDP uses both printed and electronic public sources for gathering information. All sources are manually read. The main source is the Factiva Database that is composed of over 30 000 newspapers, newswires, and other sources from around the globe. As a minimum, for each country, UCDP uses at least one of the global newswires (AFP, Reuters, AP, Xinhua, or Agencia EFE) in addition to BBC Monitoring. Additional sources include newly published books, case studies, journals like Africa Research Bulletin, research reports, documents of international and multinational organizations, publications by NGOs such as Human Rights Watch and Amnesty International, and documents of fighting parties. Sources are evaluated according to the context in which they are published, and reports are traced back to the primary source to establish reliability.

UCDP staff members manually codes approximately 10 000-12 000 events on an annual basis.

=== Georeferenced Event Dataset (GED) ===
This is one of UCDP's core dataset and it is the most disaggregated one. The GED covers individual events of organized violence (the phenomena of lethal violence occurring at a given time and place). These events are sufficiently fine-grained to have several spatial and temporal locators, such as place name, administrative division, and geographic coordinates down to the level of individual villages, as well as start and end dates, disaggregated to single, individual days. The dataset is updated annually by UCDP.

=== Armed conflict ===
The UCDP/PRIO Armed Conflict Dataset is a joint project between the UCDP and PRIO that records armed conflicts from 1946 that result in a minimum of 25 battle-related deaths and in which at least one actor is the government of a state. The dataset is updated annually by UCDP.

=== Dyadic version ===
The UCDP Dyadic Dataset is a dyad-year version of the UCDP/PRIO Armed Conflict Dataset. A dyad consists of two opposing actors in an armed conflict where at least one party is the government of a state. The dataset is updated annually by UCDP.

=== Battle-related deaths ===
This dataset contains information on the number of battle-related deaths in the conflicts from that appear in the UCDP/PRIO Armed Conflict Dataset. The dataset is updated annually.

Typically, battle-related deaths occur in what can be described as "normal" warfare involving the armed forces of the warring parties. This includes traditional battlefield fighting, guerrilla activities (e.g. hit-and-run attacks / ambushes) and all kinds of bombardments of military units, cities and villages etc. The targets are usually the military itself and its installations, or state institutions and state representatives, but there is often substantial collateral damage in the form of civilians killed in crossfire, indiscriminate bombings etc. All deaths - military as well as civilian - incurred in such situations, are counted as battle-related deaths.

Fatality figures may be substantially lower than other stated estimates as UCDP data does not include fatalities from disease and/or war-time epidemics, or combine casualty figures between different types of armed conflicts.

=== Non-state conflict ===
The UCDP Non-State Conflict Dataset contains information on communal and organized armed conflict where none of the parties is a government of a state. The dataset is updated annually by UCDP. A non-state armed conflict is defined by UCDP as “The use of armed force between two organized armed groups, neither of which is the government of a state, which results in at least 25 battle-related deaths in a year.”

=== One-sided violence ===
The UCDP One-sided Violence Dataset is an actor-year dataset with information on intentional attacks on civilians by governments and formally organized armed groups. The dataset is updated annually by UCDP. One-sided violence is defined by UCDP as “The use of armed force by the government of a state or by a formally organized group against civilians which results in at least 25 deaths in a year.”

== See also ==
- Armed Conflict Location and Event Data Project
- Casualty recording
- Correlates of War
- Peace Research Institute Oslo (PRIO)
