= List of wars: 2010–2019 =

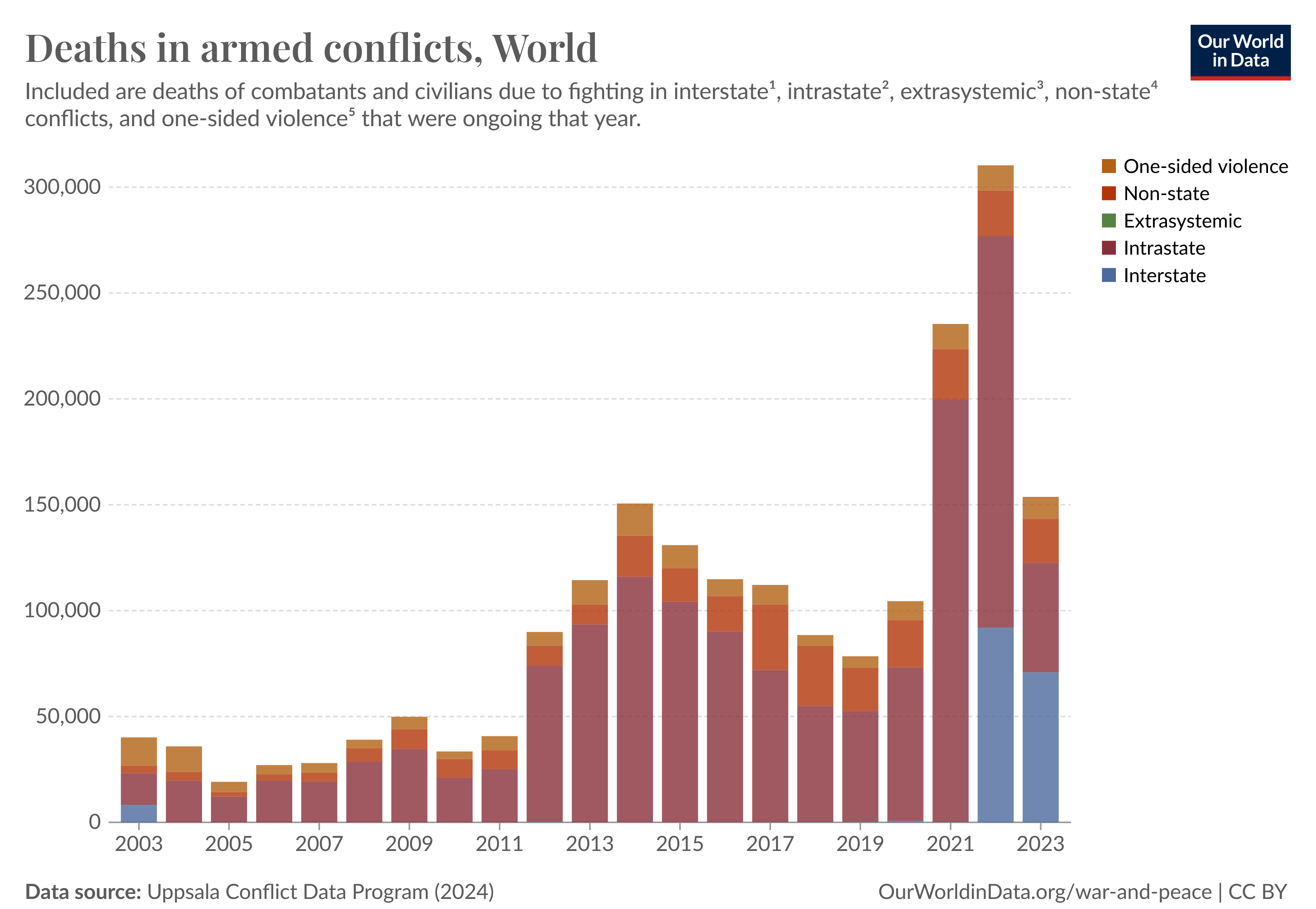
Graph of deaths in armed conflicts by type from 2003 to 2023

This is a list of wars that began from 2010 to 2019. Other wars can be found in the historical lists of wars and the list of wars extended by diplomatic irregularity.

== 2010–2019 ==
Started	Ended	Name of conflict	Belligerents	
Started	Ended	Name of conflict	Victorious party (if applicable)	Defeated party (if applicable)
2010	2010	2010 South Kyrgyzstan ethnic clashes Part of the Kyrgyz Revolution of 2010	Kyrgyz provisional government Supported by: Turkmenistan; Iran; Kazakhstan; China; Russia; Turkey	Kyrgyzstani Kyrgyz gangs: Pro-Bakiyev Kyrgyz; Other pro- Bakiyev forces: Tajik contractors; Tajikstani Tajiks; Russian Tajiks; Other mercenaries; Uzbekistani Kyrgyz^{1}: Sokh Uzbekistani Kyrgyz; Sogment Uzbekistani Kyrgyz; Islamic Movement of Uzbekistan (alleged) Kyrgyzstani Uzbeks: Pro-provisional government civilians; Uzbekistani Uzbek civilians^{1}: Sokh Uzbekistani Uzbeks; Sogment Uzbekistani Uzbeks; Uzbekistan (limited involv.)^{2}
2010	2010	2010 Kingston unrest Part of the Jamaican political conflict in the war on drugs	Jamaica: Jamaica Constabulary Force; Jamaica Defence Force; Foreign support: United States: DEA; Department of Homeland Security	Shower Posse
2010	2015	Insurgency in Gorno-Badakhshan (2010–2015)	Tajikistan: Armed Forces of Tajikistan	United Tajik Opposition: Islamic Movement of Uzbekistan; Islamic Renaissance Party of Tajikistan; Lali Badakhshan; Pamiris
2010	2011	Second Ivorian Civil War Part of the Ivorian Civil Wars	(Ivory Coast) FNCI (Liberia) Liberian mercenaries (Ivory Coast) RDR (United Nations) UNOCI; France; Ukraine	Military of Ivory Coast (Liberia) Liberian mercenaries COJEP; FPI
2011	Ongoing	Nigerian bandit conflict Part of the Herder–farmer conflicts in Nigeria	Nigeria: Nigeria Police Force; Nigerian Armed Forces; Nigerian Army; Nigerian Air Force; Vigilante groups: Vigilante Group of Nigeria; Lakurawa (2016/2018-2023)	Various bandit groups: Hausa militias; Moriki vigilantes group; Fulani militias; Ali Kachalla bandit group; Dogo Giɗe bandit group; Kachalla Halilu Sububu Seno bandit group; Adamu Aliero Yankuzo bandit group; Bello Turji Kachalla bandit gang; Dan Karami bandit gang; Kachalla Turji bandit gang; Kachalla Halilu Sububu Seno bandit gang; Islamist rebels: Islamic State: ISWAP; Boko Haram; Ansaru; Lakurawa (from c. 2023)
2011	2023	Sinai insurgency Part of the terrorism in Egypt, the Egyptian Crisis, and the Arab Winter	Egypt: Central Security Forces; Egyptian Ministry of the Interior; National Security Service; National Police; Egyptian Army; Sinai Tribal Union; Supported by: United Arab Emirates (training, counterterrorism missions)	Islamists: Ansar Bait al-Maqdis (until late 2014); Al-Qaeda; Tawhid al-Jihad; Al-Qaeda in Sinai Peninsula (2011–2018); Abdullah Azzam Brigades; Ansar al-Sharia (until 2018); Hasm Movement; Bedouin tribesmen; Jund al-Islam (until 2020); Al-Mourabitoun; Popular Resistance Movement; Takfir wal-Hijra; Army of Islam; Al Furqan Brigades; Soldiers of Egypt (until 2015); Islamic State (from 2014): Wilayat Sinai; Mujahideen Shura Council (until 2023)
2011	Ongoing	Insurgency in Bahrain Part of the 2011 Bahraini uprising and the Iran–Saudi Arabia proxy conflict	Bahrain; Supported by: Saudi Arabia; United Arab Emirates	Bahraini opposition Supported by: Iran
2011	2011	Libyan civil war (2011) Part of the Arab Spring and the Libyan Crisis since 2011	(Libya) Anti-Gaddafi forces Qatar NATO: Belgium; Bulgaria; Canada; Denmark; France; Greece; Italy; Netherlands; Norway; Poland (only humanitarian and medical aid); Romania; Spain; Turkey; United Kingdom; United States; Other countries: Jordan; Qatar; Sweden; United Arab Emirates; Minor border clashes: Tunisia: Tunisian Army; Tunisian Police; Supported by: Egypt	Libyan Arab Jamahiriya
2011	2024	Syrian civil war	Ba'athist Syria; Hezbollah; Iran; Russia (2015–present) Support Iraq (2017–19)	Syrian Interim Government (Syrian opposition); Turkey (2016–present) Support: Qatar; United States (2011–17); Saudi Arabia (2012–17); United Kingdom (2011–18); France (2011–18); Syrian Salvation Government(Tahrir al-Sham) Support: Al-Qaeda; Qatar (2012–2017); Saudi Arabia (2012–2017); Turkey (2012–2017); Islamic State (2013–present) Support Al-Qaeda (2013–2014) Rojava (Syrian Democratic Forces) (2012–present) Support: United States (2014–present); Russia (2015–18, 2019-present); France (2016–present); PKK; PUK (2013–present); KDP (2013–15); CJTF–OIR (2014–present) Participants: United States; France; United Kingdom; Jordan; Germany; Netherlands; United Arab Emirates; Saudi Arabia; Australia (2015–17); Belgium (2014–17); Bahrain (2014–16); Denmark (2014–16); Morocco (2014–16); Qatar (2014–16); Canada (2014–15)
2011	2020	Sudanese conflict in South Kordofan and Blue Nile Part of the Sudanese Civil Wars	Sudan	SRF (until 2020): JEM; SPLM–N; SLA; Alleged support: Ethiopia
2011	2017	Syrian civil war spillover in Lebanon Part of the Arab Winter, the Spillover of the Syrian Civil War and the Iran–Saudi Arabia proxy conflict	Lebanon: Lebanese Armed Forces; Internal Security Forces; Support: Australia; Canada; China; Cyprus; Czech Republic; Egypt; France; Germany; Iran; Italy; Jordan; Netherlands; Russia; Saudi Arabia; South Korea; Spain; Turkey; United Kingdom; United States; Pro-Assad militant groups: Hezbollah; Lebanese Resistance Brigades; PFLP-GC; Amal Movement; Syrian Social Nationalist Party; DFLP; Popular Nasserist Organization; As-Sa'iqa; Fatah al-Intifada; Arab Democratic Party (until 2014); Armenian Revolutionary Federation; Arab Movement Party; Support: Ba'athist Syria; Iran; Russia; Other militias: Lebanese Communist Party; Fatah	Syrian rebel forces: Free Syrian Army; Saraya Ahl al-Sham (surrendered); Islamic Front (until 2015); Jaysh al-Islam; Future Movement; Support: Saudi Arabia; Al-Qaeda and allies: Al-Nusra Front^{[a]}; Fatah al-Islam; Ghuraba al-Sham (until 2013); Jund al-Sham; Hay'at Tahrir al-Sham (surrendered); Abdullah Azzam Brigades; Osbat al-Ansar; Sunni Resistance Committees; Muslim Youth; Islamic State (surrendered) (from 2013): Military of ISIL; Free Sunnis of Baalbek Brigade
2011	Ongoing	Ethnic violence in South Sudan Part of the Sudanese nomadic conflicts	Various tribes	Various tribes
2011	2012	Operation Linda Nchi Part of the Somali Civil War (2009–present) and the Somali–Kenyan conflict	Kenya (Somalia) TFG; Raskamboni Front; ASWJ; Azania	Al-Shabaab
2011	2014	Factional violence in Libya (2011–2014) Part of the Libyan Crisis (2011–present) (aftermath of the First Libyan Civil War)	(Libya) Libyan National Army: Special Forces (Saiqa brigade); Libyan Air Force; Libyan Navy; Government-sanctioned local militias: Supreme Security Committee	Various militias: (Libya) Gaddafi loyalists; Brigade 93; Toubou Front for the Salvation of Libya; (Libya) General Haftar forces: Zintan Brigade; Pro Haftar Libyan National Army factions; Mashashya tribe (alleged); Katibat Al-Awfiyah brigade; Al-Awfea brigade (alleged); Shura Council of Benghazi Revolutionaries: Ansar Al-Sharia Brigades; Libya Shield 1
2011	2013	Iraqi insurgency (2011–2013) Part of the Iraqi conflict (2003–present)	(Iraq) Iraqi Government: Security forces; Private security contractors; Iraqi Kurdistan: Peshmerga; Asayish; CTG Kurdistan; Parastin u Zanyari; (Iraq) Sons of Iraq; Supported by: United States	Islamic State of Iraq (ISIL since April 2013); Islamic Army in Iraq; Naqshbandi Army; Other Sunni insurgents
2012 (Note: While conflicts like the AQIM insurgency and Tuareg rebellions were ongoing up until the start of the 2012 Tuareg rebellion, the conflict that would devolve into the war in the Sahel didn't start until January 2012.)	Ongoing	War in the Sahel Part of the war on terror, spillover of the Insurgency in the Maghreb (2002–present) and the War against the Islamic State	Alliance of Sahel States: Mali; Niger; Burkina Faso; Benin; Togo (Note: JNIM has had a small presence in northern Togo since 2021, with several attacks carried out since then.); Ivory Coast (Note: Jihadist groups have little to no presence on Ivorian soil, but have occasionally launched attacks along the Burkinabe-Ivorian border since 2019. AQIM attacked Grand-Bassam in 2016 as well.); Algeria (Note: No jihadist groups are active on Algerian soil, although the country has been attacked several times in the early days of the Mali War by jihadist groups. Currently, diplomatic relations between the AES states and Algeria are bad due to Algeria allowing FLA rebels on their soil.); Mauritania (Note: The Mauritanian government currently has a non-aggression pact with JNIM-aligned jihadists, and has not had an attack by jihadist groups on its soil since 2011. Small JNIM cells are present along the Malian border.) Nigeria Supported by: Africa Corps (since 2021) (Note: Previously Wagner Group, since renamed Africa Corps and absorbed by Russian government.); Turkey (since 2022); France (2013–2023); United States (until 2024); MINUSMA (2013–2023) (Note: For full list of MINUSMA combatants, see here); AFISMA (2012–2013); G5 Sahel (until 2023)	Al-Qaeda; Jama'at Nasr al-Islam wal Muslimin; Nigerian Brigade; Ansarul Islam; Boko Haram; Islamic State; Islamic State - Sahel Province; Lakurawa (2023–present); Katibat Salaheddin (2017 – 2018); Islamic State - West Africa Province; Azawad Liberation Front Nigerien anti-coup movement: Patriotic Front for Justice; Free Armed Forces; Former belligerents: CSP-PSD (2023-2024); Coordination of Azawad Movements (2014–2021, 2023–2024); MNLA (2012–2024); HCUA (2013–2024); MAA (2012–2024) GATIA (al-Mahmoud faction) (2023–2024) (Note: Faction affiliated with the CSP-PSD) Patriotic Liberation Front (2023–2024)
2012	Ongoing	Mali War Part of the Islamist insurgency in the Sahel and the war on terror	Mali: Russia (2021–); Africa Corps; France (2013–22) Supported by: ECOWAS: Benin; Burkina Faso (until 2025); Cape Verde; Gambia; Ghana; Guinea; Guinea-Bissau; Ivory Coast; Liberia; Niger (until 2025); Nigeria; Sierra Leone; Senegal; Togo; Burkina Faso (2025–); Niger (2025–): MINUSMA (2013–23) (Note: MINUSMA, the United Nations Multidimensional Integrated Stabilization Mission in Mali, included troops from Chad, Bangladesh, Senegal, Togo, Egypt, Burkina Faso, Niger, Ivory Coast, Guinea, Germany, China, Benin, among others); Supported by: EUTM Mali (2013–23) Others: Angola; Australia; Bangladesh; Belgium; Canada; Comoros; Czech Republic; Denmark; European Union; Germany; Hungary; India; Iran; Ireland; Italy; Japan; Mauritania; Namibia; Netherlands; North Korea; Romania; Spain; Turkey; United Arab Emirates; United Kingdom; United States; Non-state combatants: Platform: Popular Movement for the Salvation of Azawad; Ganda Iso; MAA-Loyaliste; MSA (2016–); GATIA (Ag Gamou faction) (2014–23); Wagner Group (2021–25) (Note: The participation of the Wagner Group, a Russian private military company, has been denied by both Russia and Mali, which insist Russia is only sending military advisors.): CSP-DPA (2021–23); Coordination of Azawad Movements; Platform	CSP-PSD (2023–24); Coordination of Azawad Movements (2014–21, 2023–24); MNLA (2012–24); HCUA (2013–24); MAA (2012–24); GATIA (al-Mahmoud faction) (2023–24) (Note: Faction affiliated with the CSP-PSD); Azawad Liberation Front (2024–); Supported by: Ukraine: Al-Qaeda; AQIM (2012–17); Ansaru (2012–13); Al-Mourabitoun (2013–17); Jama'at Nasr al-Islam wal-Muslimin (2017–present); Boko Haram (2012–13); MOJWA (2012–13): Ansar Dine (2012–17); Macina Liberation Front (2012–17); Islamic State; Sahel Province
2012	2012	Heglig Crisis	Sudan	South Sudan; JEM SPLM-N
2012	2013	M23 rebellion Part of the Kivu conflict	Democratic Republic of the Congo (United Nations) MONUSCO: (United Nations) Force Intervention Brigade; South Africa; Tanzania; Malawi	March 23 Movement; Alleged support: Uganda; Rwanda
2012	2012	2012 Abyan offensive Part of the Yemeni Crisis (2011-present)	Yemen; Supported by: United States; Saudi Arabia	Al-Qaeda in the Arabian Peninsula; Ansar al-Sharia
2012	2012	Baragoi clashes	Samburu tribe	Turkana tribe
2012	Ongoing	Central African Republic Civil War	Central African Republic; Central African Armed Forces; MINUSCA (since 2014) Rwanda (since 2020); Russia (since 2018); Wagner Group; Russian Imperial Movement; Black Russians; Azande Ani Kpi Gbe; Formerly: South Africa (2013); MISCA (2013–2014) MICOPAX (2008–2013): Angola; Cameroon; Chad; Morocco; Uganda; Congo-Brazzaville; DRC; Gabon; Burundi; Equatorial Guinea; São Tomé and Príncipe; France (2013–2021) EUFOR RCA (2014–2015): Estonia; Finland; Georgia; Latvia; Luxembourg; Netherlands; Portugal; Poland; Romania; Spain; Italy	Coalition of Patriots for Change (since 2020): Anti-balaka; 3R; UPC; FPRC; MPC; PRNC; CMSPR (since 2024) Support: Chad (alleged); RSF; Defunct groups: Séléka (2012–2014): CPJP; CPSK; UFDR; FDPC; FPR; RJ (2013–2018); MNLC (2017–2019); MLCJ (2008–2022); RPRC (2014–2022)
2013	2013	Lahad Datu standoff Part of the North Borneo dispute and cross border attacks in Sabah	Malaysia; Sabahan local villagers Supported by: Philippines (Note: Supported Malaysian action during the standoff, but was not involved in the operation.)	(Sulu Sultanate) Sultanate of Sulu (Jamalul Kiram III's faction); Filipino illegal immigrants (non-combative); Supported by: Moro National Liberation Front (Misuari faction)
2013	2018	Batwa–Luba clashes Part of the Katanga insurgency	Pygmy batwa militias: "Perci"	Luba militias: "Elements"
2013	2021	RENAMO insurgency (2013–2021)	Mozambique	RENAMO (until 2019); RENAMO Military Junta (from 2019)
2013	2013	Zamboanga City crisis Part of the Moro conflict	Philippines	Bangsamoro Republik
2013	2020	South Sudanese Civil War Part of the Ethnic violence in South Sudan	South Sudan: SPLA; Air Force; Mathiang Anyoor; Maban Defence Force; Allied militias: SSLM; SRF: JEM (Note: The SPLM-IO accused JEM of supporting Kiir's government since 2013, though JEM has denied any involvement and claims to maintain neutrality in the South Sudanese Civil War. The Sudanese government, aid workers and other sources have however affirmed that JEM is taking part in conflict on the side of the South Sudanese government.); SPLM-N (alleged); SLA-AW; SLA-MM; EUPF (alleged); State allies: Uganda; Egypt (alleged)	(United Nations) UNMISS: (United Nations) Regional Protection Force; Rwanda; Ethiopia; (South Sudan) SPLM-IO; Nuer White Army (South Sudan) SSDM: Cobra Faction (Note: The Cobra Faction openly opposed the government until 2014, and remained in relative opposition until 2015, when it divided into a pro-government and pro-SPLM-IO faction, the latter of which formed the Greater Pibor Forces. In early 2016, the Cobra Faction effectively disbanded, when the remaining group joined the government. In September 2016, however, the Cobra Faction was declared restored by some of its commanders and declared that it had resumed its struggle against the government.); Greater Pibor Forces (since 2015); (South Sudan) Agwelek forces; TFNF; SSFDP; South Sudan National Army; NAS; Arrow Boys (since Nov. 2015); Wau State insurgents SSOA (until September 2018); SSOMA/NSSSOG (until Jan. 2020); Supported by: Sudan (South Sudanese gov. claim)
2013	2017	War in Iraq (2013–2017) Part of the Iraqi conflict, spillover of the Syrian civil war, War against the Islamic State, and the war on terror	Central government of Iraq; Iraqi Armed Forces; Iraqi Ground Forces; Iraqi Air Force; CTS-ISOF; Popular Mobilization Forces; Assyrian Forces (Iraqi command); Federal Police; Kurdistan Region; Peshmerga; Zeravani; Kurdistan Region Security Council; CTG Kurdistan; Parastin u Zanyari; Assyrian Forces (Kurdish command); Allied groups: Sinjar Alliance; PKK; Rojava; Kurdish National Council; Iraqi Turkmen Front; Iraqi Communist Party; Various self-defense groups; Others: Iran; Hezbollah; Syria CJTF–OIR; United States; United Kingdom; Canada; Australia; France; Italy; Netherlands; New Zealand; Finland; Denmark	Islamic State: Sunni Insurgent Factions (2012–2015); (Ba'athist Iraq) Naqshbandi Army (2013–2015); Anbar Tribal Council (2013–2015); GMCIR (2014); Army of Pride and Dignity; Free Iraqi Army (2012–2014); Islamic Army in Iraq (2013–2014); 1920 Revolution Brigades (2013–2015)
2014	Ongoing	Russo-Ukrainian War (outline) Part of the conflicts in territory of the former Soviet Union	Russia; Donetsk PR (Note: The Donetsk People's Republic and the Luhansk People's Republic were Russian puppet states that declared their independence from Ukraine in May 2014. In 2022, they received international recognition from each other, Russia, Syria and North Korea, and some other partially recognised states. On 30 September 2022, Russia declared that it had formally annexed both entities. They continue to exist as republics of Russia.); Luhansk PR; North Korea; Belarus (Note: In 2022, Belarus allowed Russia to use its territory to launch the invasion and to launch missiles into Ukraine.); Supplied by: For details, see Russian military suppliers	Ukraine Supplied by: For countries providing aid to Ukraine since 2022, see military aid to Ukraine
2014	2014	2014 Aswan tribal clashes	Arabic Al-Halayel clan	Nubian Al-Dabodeya clan
2014	2020	Libyan civil war (2014–2020) Part of the Arab Winter, the Libyan Crisis, the Iran–Saudi Arabia proxy conflict, the war on terror, and the Qatar–Saudi Arabia diplomatic conflict	(Libya) House of Representatives (Tobruk-based): Libyan National Army; Libyan Air Force (LNA–aligned); Libyan Navy (LNA–aligned); Others: Zintan brigades; JEM (from 2016); SLM/A-Minnawi; Gaddafi loyalists; Popular Front for the Liberation of Libya; Warshefana militias; Wagner Group (from 2018) Egypt; United Arab Emirates; RSF (from 2019); Ba'athist Syria (2020); Hezbollah (allegedly); Israel (allegedly, denied by LNA); Iran Support: Russia; France; Saudi Arabia; Chad; Jordan; Belarus; Greece; Cyprus; United States; United Kingdom	(Libya) Government of National Accord (Tripoli-based) (from 2016): Libyan Ground Forces; Libyan Air Force (GNA–aligned); Libyan Navy (GNA–aligned); Others: Presidential Guard; Misrata Brigades; Sabratha Revolutionary Brigades; Petroleum Facilities Guard; Tripoli Protection Force (from 2018); Misratan Third Force; Tuareg militias of Ghat; Toubou Front for the Salvation of Libya; Chadian rebels (FACT, CCMSR, URF and UFDD); Turkey (2020) (Syrian opposition) Syrian National Army (from 2019) (Yemen) Popular Resistance Committees; Hamas (LNA claim, denied by Hamas) Support: Qatar; Sudan (until 2019); Pakistan; Iran; Morocco; Malta; Italy; European Union (except Greece, Cyprus and France); United Kingdom; United States (until 2019); Ukraine; Algeria; United Nations; (Libya) National Salvation Government (2014–2017): Libya Dawn Coalition; Libya Shield Force; LROR; Libyan National Guard; Support: Sudan (2014–16); Turkey (2014–16); Qatar (2014–16); Iran (allegedly); Ukraine; Islamic State (from 2014): Wilayat Barqa; Wilayat Tarabulus; Wilayat Fezzan; Support: AQIM (2014–2015; alleged in 2016); al-Qaeda in the Islamic Maghreb (2014–2017); Shura Council of Benghazi Revolutionaries (2014–2017) SCBR militia: Ansar al-Sharia (2014–2017); Libya Shield 1 (2014–16); Rafallah al-Sahati Brigade; Others: (Libya) Benghazi Defense Brigades; Ajdabiya Revolutionaries Shura Council (2015–16); (Libya) Derna Protection Force
2014	Ongoing	War against the Islamic State Part of the war on terror, the Second Libyan Civil War, the War in Iraq (2013–2017), the Syrian civil war and its spillover, the Sinai insurgency, the Boko Haram insurgency, the insurgency in the North Caucasus, the Moro conflict, the insurgency in Cabo Delgado, the Islamic State insurgency in Puntland the Sahel War and the Salafi-jihadist insurgency in the Gaza Strip	In multiple regions: CJTF–OIR; IMCTC; In Iraq: Iraq; Iraqi Kurdistan; United States; Iran; In Syria: Ba'athist Syria (2011–2024); Russia; Iran; Syrian transitional government (since 2024); Turkey; Syrian Salvation Government (2017–2024); Syrian Interim Government (2013–2025); Autonomous Administration of North and East Syria (2015–present); United States; In the Levant: Egypt (See: Sinai insurgency); Israel; Hamas; In Libya: Libya Government of National Accord House of Representatives; Egypt; France; United States; In Afghanistan: Islamic Republic of Afghanistan; Islamic Emirate of Afghanistan (Taliban, conflict since 2015); In West Africa: Multinational Joint Task Force	Islamic State: Wilayat Libya (in Libya); Wilayat Sinai (in the Sinai); ISWAP (West Africa); IS-GS (Sahel); IS-CAP (Central Africa); Ansar al-Sunna (in Mozambique); Wilayat Khorasan (in Afghanistan and Pakistan); Wilayat Qavqaz (in the North Caucasus); Abu Sayyaf (in Southeast Asia); Wilayat Somalia (in Somalia)
2014	2014	2014 Gaza War Part of the Gaza–Israel conflict	Israel	Gaza Strip; Hamas; Palestinian Islamic Jihad; Popular Front for the Liberation of Palestine; Democratic Front for the Liberation of Palestine; Popular Resistance Committees; Abdullah Azzam Brigades; Jaysh al-Ummah; Al-Aqsa Martyrs' Brigades
2014	Ongoing	Yemeni civil war (2014–present) Part of the Yemeni crisis, the Arab Winter, the war on terror, and the Iran–Saudi Arabia proxy conflict	Supreme Political Council (formerly SRC); Houthis; GPC (pro-Houthi); Saleh loyalists (until 2017); Pro-Houthi Popular Committees; Sanaa-GPC forces	Republic of Yemen (internationally recognized; led by the PLC since 2022); Yemeni Armed Forces; Republican Guard; GPC; STC (2022–present) (Note: Since April 2022, the Southern Transitional Council is part of the Yemeni government led by the Presidential Leadership Council. Multiple sources: Salem, Mostafa; Kolirin, Lianne (7 April 2022). "Hopes of peace in Yemen as President hands power to new presidential council". CNN. Archived from the original on 8 April 2022.; Ghobari, Mohamed (7 April 2022). "Yemen president sacks deputy, delegates presidential powers to council". Aden: Reuters. Archived from the original on 1 May 2022.; Al-Sakani, Ali (19 April 2022). "Yemen inaugurates new presidential council". Al Jazeera. Archived from the original on 1 March 2023.); United Arab Emirates; National Resistance (2017–present); Tihamah Resistance; Giants Brigades; Hadhramaut Tribal Alliance; Al-Islah; Bani Dhabyan; Saleh loyalists (2017–present); Popular Resistance; Popular Committees; Saudi-led coalition: Saudi Arabia; United Arab Emirates; Sudan; Senegal; Morocco (2015–19); Qatar (2015–17); Kuwait; Bahrain; South Korea; Academi security guards (2015–16) Janjaweed (2019-2023); STC (2017–2022); United Arab Emirates: Al-Qaeda and allies; AQAP; Ansar al-Sharia; Council of Scholars of Ahl al-Sunna wal-Jama'ah; Hadhrami Domestic council; Dhi Na'im tribe; Al-Hamiqan tribe; Islamic State; Yemen Province
2014	2015	Houthi takeover in Yemen Part of the Yemeni civil war (2014–present)	Houthis: Saleh Security forces; Republican Guard	Cabinet of Yemen: Security Forces; Al-Islah militias; United States; Saudi Arabia
2015	Ongoing	Islamic State–Taliban conflict Part of the Afghan conflict, war on terror, and al-Qaeda–Islamic State conflict	Afghanistan; Taliban; Haqqani network; Al-Qaeda; Islamic Movement of Uzbekistan (pro-Taliban & anti-IS factions); Turkistan Islamic Party; Pakistani Taliban	Islamic State; Khorasan Province; IS central command; Mullah Dadullah Front(until 2016); Fidai Mahaz (until 2021); Islamic Movement of Uzbekistan (pro-IS factions)
2015	2022	Islamic State insurgency in Tunisia Part of the spillover of the Second Libyan Civil War, the Arab Winter, war on terror and War against the Islamic State	Tunisia: Tunisian National Guard; Tunisian Army; Tunisian Police	Islamic State: Islamic State – Libya Province; Islamic State – Algeria Province; Islamic State – Tunisia Province; Uqba ibn Nafi Brigade; Ansar al-Sharia (only in March 2016)
2015	2025	Kurdish–Turkish conflict (2015–2025) Part of the Kurdistan Workers' Party insurgency, Kurdish–Turkish conflict and the Spillover of the Syrian civil war	Turkey	Kurdistan Communities Union (KCK); PKK (until 2025); HPG; YJA-STAR; YDG-H; CPU; YPS-Jin; SDF; YPG; YPJ; PFLK; HBDH; Kurdistan Freedom Hawks
2016	Ongoing	2016 Niger Delta conflict Part of the conflict in the Niger Delta	Nigeria: Niger Delta Revolutionary Crusaders (since 2019); Nigerian Armed Forces Involved states; Abia State; Akwa Ibom State; Bayelsa State; Cross River State; Delta State; Edo State; Imo State; Ondo State; Rivers State	Niger Delta Republic Militant organizations: Adaka Boro Avengers; Asawana Deadly Force of Niger Delta; Niger Delta Avengers; Niger Delta Greenland Justice Mandate; Niger Delta Justice Defence Group; Niger Delta Volunteers; Niger Delta Red Squad; Niger Delta Revolutionary Crusaders (until 2019); Reformed Egbesu Fraternities; Egbesu Boys of the Niger Delta; Egbesu Red Water Lions; Egbesu Mightier Fraternity; (Republic of Biafra) Indigenous People of Biafra
2016	2016	2016 Nagorno-Karabakh conflict Part of the Nagorno-Karabakh conflict	Artsakh; Armenia	Azerbaijan
2016	2017	Pool War	Republic of the Congo	Ninja militia
2016	Ongoing	Philippine drug war Part of the Civil conflict in the Philippines, Cross border attacks in Sabah, spillovers of the Colombian Conflict and Mexican drug war and of the Insurgency in south Thailand and War against Islamic State	(Philippines) Philippine government: Philippine National Police; Inter-Agency Committee on Anti-Illegal Drugs; Philippine Drug Enforcement Agency; National Bureau of Investigation; Armed Forces of the Philippines; Bureau of Customs; Department of Justice; Anti-Money Laundering Council; Philippine Coast Guard; Non-state participants, armed organizations: CPP-NPA (until August 2016 (Note: The Communist Party of the Philippines (CPP) and its armed wing the New People's Army (NPA), initially cooperated with the government but withdrew its support for the government's campaign against drugs in August 2016. The CPP has vowed to continue operations, independent from the government's anti-drug campaign, against drug suspects.)); MILF; Vigilantes; Davao Death Squad; Hired hitmen; Foreign support: (Note: Foreign support towards the campaign against illegal drugs includes intelligence sharing, training of Filipino law enforcement officers, and financial aid explicitly meant for such purposes. Excludes governments which has only expressed verbal, diplomatic support, and pledges that have yet to be realized.): China (intelligence and financial support); Singapore (intelligence support); United States (financial support)	Philippine drug cartels and gangs: Kuratong Baleleng; Waray-Waray gangs; Bahala Na Gang; Sigue Sigue Sputnik; Foreign drug cartels: Sinaloa Cartel; Chinese Triads; Colombian Drug Cartels (allegedly); Jihadist militant and pirate groups: (Islamic State) Abu Sayyaf (allegedly); Ninja cops (police officers engaged in the drug trade) Suspected drug users
2016	2019	Kamwina Nsapu rebellion	DR Congo; Allied militias: Bana Mura; Ecurie Mbembe; Smaller pro-government groups	Kamwina Nsapu rebels: Various independent militias
2016	Ongoing	Conflict in Rakhine State Part of the Myanmar civil war and Rohingya conflict	Myanmar; Allied groups: Arakan Liberation Army	Arakan Army; Support: Asho Chin Defence Force; People's Revolution Alliance (Magway); Arakan Rohingya Salvation Army: Rohingya Solidarity Organisation; Rohingya Islami Mahaz; Arakan Rohingya Army
2016	2016	Kasese clashes	Uganda	Rwenzururu
2016	Ongoing	Insurgency in Chad (2016–present)	Chad; France (until 2025); Central African Republic (2023) JEM	FACT; CCMSR; UFR; FNDJT; MDJT; UFDD; FPRN; FPR; MRST; RPJET (At least 47 rebel groups overall)
2017	2017	2017 Afghanistan–Pakistan border skirmish Part of the Afghanistan–Pakistan skirmishes	Pakistan	Afghanistan
2017	2020	2017–2020 Qatif unrest Part of the Qatif conflict	Saudi Arabia	Hezbollah Al-Hejaz (Suspected); Other Shia Militias; Supported by: Saraya al-Mukhtar (Bahrain) Bahraini Militias
2017	2017	Siege of Marawi Part of the Moro conflict and the war against the Islamic State	Philippines	Islamic State
2017	Ongoing	Anglophone Crisis Part of the Anglophone problem	Cameroon	Ambazonia
2017	Ongoing	Insurgency in Cabo Delgado Part of the war against the Islamic State, Islamic terrorism in Africa and the war on terror	Mozambique; Rwanda (from 2021); Southern African Development Community (from 2021): South Africa; Botswana; Lesotho; Tanzania; Angola; Zambia; Malawi; DRC; Namibia; Private Military Companies: Dyck Advisory Group; Control Risks; Paramount Group; Frontier Services Group; Wagner Group	Ansar al-Sunna; Islamic State Bandits
2017	2017	2017 Iraqi–Kurdish conflict Part of the Iraqi–Kurdish conflict	Iraq; Supported by: Iran	(Kurdistan Region) Kurdistan Regional Government PKK; PDKI White Flags (alleged)
2017	Ongoing	Islamic State insurgency in Iraq (2017–present) Part of the Iraqi conflict and war against the Islamic State	Iraq; Iraqi Federal Police; Iraqi Armed Forces; Special Operations Forces (SOF); Popular Mobilization Forces (PMF); Pro-Government Tribes (ar); Islamic Resistance in Iraq; Supported by: Iran Rojava (cross-border cooperation since May 2018); Supported by: CJTF-OIR: United States; United Kingdom; France; Kurdistan Region; Peshmerga; Supported by: Netherlands	Islamic State; White Flags (2017–2018)
2018	Ongoing	War on drugs in Ecuador Part of the war on drugs	Government of Ecuador: National Police of Ecuador; Armed Forces of Ecuador; Ecuadorian Army; Ecuadorian Navy; Ecuadorian Air Force; Armed civilians Counter-terrorist PMCs Supported by: United States; CIA; Canada; Colombia; Mexico (until 2024); Peru	Organized crime groups: Sinaloa Cartel; Los Choneros; CJNG; Los Lobos; Chone Killers; Los Tiguerones; Los Lagartos; Latin Kings; NETA Association; PCE-SR; FARC–EP; FARC dissidents; ELN; La Empresa; Other groups
2018	Ongoing	Catatumbo campaign Part of the Colombian conflict (1964–present), the war on drugs (1993–present), and the Crisis in Venezuela (2010–present)	Colombia: 2nd Division	Popular Liberation Army (EPL) National Liberation Army (ELN): Nororiental de Guerra; Los Rastrojos FARC dissidents
2018	2018	2018 Armenian–Azerbaijani clashes Part of the Nagorno-Karabakh conflict	Azerbaijan	Armenia
2018	Ongoing	OLA insurgency Part of the Oromo conflict and Ethiopian civil conflict (2018–present)	Ethiopia; Oromia	OLA
2018	2018	November 2018 Gaza–Israel clashes Part of the Gaza–Israel conflict	Israel	Gaza Strip: Hamas; Islamic Jihad; PFLP; al-Aqsa Martyrs' Brigades; PRC
2019	2019	2019 India–Pakistan border skirmishes Part of the Indo−Pakistani conflicts and the Kashmir conflict	India: Indian Army; Indian Air Force; Indian Navy; CRPF	Jaish-e-Mohammed Pakistan: Pakistan Army; Pakistan Air Force; Pakistan Navy
2019	2019	May 2019 Gaza–Israel clashes Part of the Gaza–Israel conflict	Israel	Gaza Strip: Hamas; Palestinian Islamic Jihad; National Resistance Brigades
2019	2022	Benishangul-Gumuz conflict Part of the Ethiopian civil conflict (2018–present)	Ethiopia: ENDF; Benishangul-Gumuz Region; Amhara Region; Fano militias	(Benishangul-Gumuz Region) Gumuz People’s Democratic Movement; Benishangul People's Liberation Movement; Oromo Liberation Army; Tigray People's Liberation Front (alleged); Support: Sudan (Gumuz militiamen only); Egypt (alleged by Ethiopia)
2019	2019	November 2019 Gaza–Israel clashes Part of the Gaza–Israel conflict	Israel	Palestinian Islamic Jihad

== See also ==
Lists of wars in World (by date, region, type of conflict)
Lists of wars and conflict by region
List of invasions in the 21st century
Lists of battles (Orders)
List of wars by death toll
List of terrorist incidents
List of active rebel groups
- List of rebel groups that control territory
List of designated terrorist organizations
List of number of conflicts per year
- List of most lethal battles in world history
Africa
List of conflicts in Africa (Military history of Africa)
- List of modern conflicts in North Africa (Maghreb)
- Conflicts in the Horn of Africa (East region)
Americas
List of conflicts in North America
- List of wars involving the United States
List of conflicts in Central America
List of conflicts in South America
Asia
List of conflicts in Asia
List of conflicts in the Near East
List of conflicts in the Middle East
- List of modern conflicts in the Middle East
Europe
List of conflicts in Europe
- Post-Cold War European conflicts
Others
- List of wars extended by diplomatic irregularity
- Uppsala Conflict Data Program
- Failed state
Ongoing conflicts in World
List of ongoing armed conflicts
Related lists
List of wars: before 1000
List of wars: 1000–1499
List of wars: 1500–1799
List of wars: 1800–1899
List of wars: 1900–1944
List of wars: 1945–1989
List of wars: 1990–2002
List of wars: 2000–2009
List of wars: 2020–present
- Ongoing military conflicts
- Maps of ongoing conflicts

== Sources ==
- "Curbing Violence in Nigeria (II): The Boko Haram Insurgency" (PDF). Africa Report (216). Brussels: International Crisis Group. 3 April 2014. Archived from the original (PDF) on 17 January 2016.
- "Watchmen of Lake Chad: Vigilante Groups Fighting Boko Haram" (PDF). Africa Report (244). Brussels: International Crisis Group. 23 February 2018.
- Comolli, Virginia (2015). Boko Haram: Nigeria's Islamist Insurgency. London: Oxford University Press.
- Craze, Joshua; Tubiana, Jérôme; Gramizzi, Claudio (2016). Emile LeBrun (ed.). "A State of Disunity: Conflict Dynamics in Unity State, South Sudan, 2013–15" (PDF). HSBA Working Paper (42). Geneva: Small Arms Survey. ISBN 978-2-940548-32-3.
- "Kasaï conflict assessment: Current Dynamics & Potential Interventions (February-March 2019)" (PDF). Mercy Corps. 10 June 2019.
- Themnér, Anders (2015). "Former Military Networks and the Micro-Politics of Violence and Statebuilding in Liberia". Comparative Politics. 47 (1). New York City: Graduate Center, CUNY: 334–353. doi:10.5129/001041515814709284.
- "Timeline of Recent Intra-Southern Conflict" (PDF). Geneva: Small Arms Survey. 27 June 2014.
- TRADOC G-2 (2015). Threat Tactics Report: Boko Haram (PDF). Fort Eustis: United States Army Training and Doctrine Command.
- Johnson, Casey Garret (November 2016). "The Rise and Stall of the Islamic State in Afghanistan" (PDF). Special Report (395). Washington, D.C.: United States Institute of Peace: 9–13. Archived from the original (PDF) on 10 March 2017.
- Walker, Summer (October 2022). Gangs of Haiti: Expansion, power and an escalating crisis (PDF). Geneva: Global Initiative Against Transnational Organized Crime.
- Warner, Jason; Hulme, Charlotte (2018). "The Islamic State in Africa: Estimating Fighter Numbers in Cells Across the Continent" (PDF). CTC Sentinel. 11 (7). West Point, New York: Combating Terrorism Center: 21–28. Archived from the original (PDF) on 8 August 2019.
