= Timeline of wars =

The timeline of wars has been split up in the following periods:

- List of wars: before 1000
- List of wars: 1000–1499
- List of wars: 1500–1799
- List of wars: 1800–1899
- List of wars: 1900–1944
- List of wars: 1945–1989
- List of wars: 1990–1999
- List of wars: 2000-2009
- List of wars: 2010-2019
- List of wars: 2020–present

== See also ==
- List of wars by death toll
