= List of wars: 2000–2009 =

This is a list of wars that began from 2000 to 2009. Other wars can be found in the historical lists of wars and the list of wars extended by diplomatic irregularity.

== 2000-2002 ==
Started	Ended	Name of Conflict	Belligerents	
Started	Ended	Name of Conflict	Victorious party (if applicable)	Defeated party (if applicable)
2000	2000	Six-Day War (2000); Part of the Second Congo War	Rwanda	Uganda
2000	2005	Second Intifada; Part of the Israeli–Palestinian conflict	Israel	Palestinian Authority; PLO; Fatah; Popular Front for the Liberation of Palestine; Democratic Front for the Liberation of Palestine; Hamas; Palestinian Islamic Jihad; Popular Resistance Committees
2000	2006	2000–2006 Shebaa Farms conflict Part of the Israeli–Lebanese conflict and the Iran–Israel proxy conflict	Israel	Hezbollah
2001	2001	2001 insurgency in Macedonia Part of the Yugoslav Wars	(North Macedonia) Macedonia	National Liberation Army; Albanian National Army
2001	2001	2001 Bangladesh–India border clashes	Bangladesh	India
2001	2001	2001 Special Operations Unit mutiny	Special Operations Unit; Zemun Clan Support: President of FR Yugoslavia; Democratic Party of Serbia; Socialist Party of Serbia; Serbian Radical Party; New Serbia	(Republic of Serbia (1992–2006)) Government of Serbia Support: Democratic Party; New Democracy; Christian Democratic Party of Serbia
2001	2003	Islamist insurgency in Iraqi Kurdistan; Part of the Iraqi no-fly zones conflict, the Iraq War, Islamism in Kurdistan, and the war on terror	Kurdistan Region; PUK; United States (armed involvement after Viking Hammer)	Islamic Emirate of Kurdistan; Ansar al-Islam; Kurdistan Islamic Group; Kurdistan Islamic Movement; Supported by: Iran (alleged by PUK); KDP (alleged by PUK)
2001	Ongoing	War on terror Part of the post-Cold War and post-9/11 eras	Main countries: United States; United Kingdom; Germany; Italy; Canada; France; Australia; New Zealand; Netherlands; Poland; Turkey	Main opponents: Al-Qaeda; Islamic State (Note: ISIS is sometimes in conflict with and/or fighting against Al-Qaeda and the Taliban, see: Al-Qaeda–Islamic State conflict and ISIS-Taliban conflict.); First Islamic Emirate of Afghanistan (Taliban); Ba'athist Iraq (Note: The Saddam Hussein and al-Qaeda link allegations were widely disputed and now largely believed to have been false.); Iraqi Ba'athist insurgents
2001	2021	Taliban insurgency Part of the War in Afghanistan (2001–2021), the Afghan conflict, and the war on terror	Taliban; · Haqqani network (from 2002); al-Qaeda; · Al-Qaeda in the Indian Subcontinent; Taliban splinter groups; · Mullah Dadullah Front (from 2012); · Fidai Mahaz (from 2013); Supported by: Hezb-e-Islami Gulbuddin (on and off until 2016); Islamic Jihad Union (from 2002); Islamic Movement of Uzbekistan (until 2015); Turkistan Islamic Party; Lashkar-e-Jhangvi; Pakistani Taliban; Lashkar-e-Islam; Iran (alleged, but denied by Iran); Pakistan (alleged, but denied by Pakistan); Russia (alleged, but denied by Russia); Saudi Arabia (alleged, but denied by Saudi Arabia); Qatar (alleged by Saudi Arabia, but denied by Qatar); China (alleged by the US, but denied by China)	Islamic State of Afghanistan (2001–2002); Afghan Transitional Authority (2002–2004): Islamic Republic of Afghanistan (2004–2021); Afghan National Security Forces; ISAF (2001–2014): Albania; Armenia (IPAP); Australia (GP); Austria (PfP); Azerbaijan (PfP); Bahrain (ICI); Belgium; Bosnia and Herzegovina (IPAP); Bulgaria (Note: Major contributing nations with more than 200 troops as of May 2015); Canada; Croatia; Czech Republic; Denmark; El Salvador; Estonia; Finland (PfP); France; Georgia (IPAP); Germany; Greece; Hungary; Iceland; Iran; Ireland (PfP); Italy; Jordan (MD); Latvia; Lithuania; Luxembourg; Malaysia; Mongolia (GP); Montenegro (PfP); Netherlands; New Zealand (GP); Norway; Pakistan; Poland; Portugal; North Macedonia (MAP); Romania; Singapore (2008–13); Slovakia; Slovenia; South Korea (GP); Spain; Sweden (PfP); Switzerland (2004–08) (PfP); Tonga; Turkey; Ukraine (PfP); United Arab Emirates (ICI); United Kingdom; United States; RS (2015 onwards): Luxembourg; Slovenia; New Zealand; Greece; Austria; Ukraine; Sweden; Montenegro; Latvia; Estonia; North Macedonia; Lithuania; Slovakia; Norway; Finland; Bosnia and Herzegovina; Belgium; Hungary; Albania; Azerbaijan; Armenia; Denmark; Bulgaria; Netherlands; Portugal; Mongolia; Poland; Australia; Croatia; Czech Republic; Georgia (IPAP); Germany; Italy; Romania; Spain; Turkey; United Kingdom; United States; Allied militias: High Council of the Islamic Emirate of Afghanistan (allegedly since 2015); Jamiat-e Islami; Junbish-i-Milli; Hezbe Wahdat
2002	2017	Operation Enduring Freedom – Philippines; Part of the Philippine civil conflict, Islamic terrorism and Global War on Terror	Philippines: Armed Forces of the Philippines; Philippine National Police; United States (advisors): Armed Forces of the United States; CIA	Islamic jihad: Abu Sayyaf; BIFF; Maute Group; Moro Islamic Liberation Front (until 2012); Islamic State of Iraq and the Levant (de facto)
2002	2003	2002–2003 conflict in the Pool Department	Republic of the Congo	Ninja militia
2002	2007	First Ivorian Civil War; Part of the Ivorian Civil Wars	Ivory Coast; COJEP; Supported by: Belarus	FNCI; Alleged support: Burkina Faso; Liberia France; UNOCI
2002	Ongoing	Operation Enduring Freedom – Horn of Africa	United Kingdom; United States	Insurgents: Islamic State of Iraq and the Levant (from 2015); al-Qaeda (from 2002); Al-Shabaab (from 2006); al-Itihaad al-Islamiya (2002–06); Hizbul Islam (2009–14); Ras Kamboni Brigades (2007–10); Jabhatul Islamiya (2007–09); Mu'askar Anole (2007–09)

== 2003 ==
Started	Ended	Name of conflict	Belligerents	
Started	Ended	Name of conflict	Victorious party (if applicable)	Defeated party (if applicable)
2003	2020	War in Darfur; Part of the Sudanese Civil Wars and the Second Sudanese Civil War (until 2005)	Sudan; SAF; Janjaweed; RSF; Chadian rebel groups; Anti-Gaddafi forces (2011); Supported by: Libya (2011–2020); China; Iran (until 2016); Russia; Belarus; Syria (2000s, alleged)	SRF (Note: Known as the National Redemption Front prior to 2011.) (2006–2020); JEM (2003–2020); SLA (some factions; 2003–2020); LJM (2010–11) (Note: Signed the Doha Darfur Peace Agreement in 2011.); SLA (some factions); SARC (2014–2020); SLFA (2017–2020); SLA-Unity; SLMJ; JEM (Jali); Supported by: South Sudan; Chad (2005–2010); Eritrea (until 2008); Libya (until 2011); Uganda (until 2015); (United Nations) UNAMID (2007–2020)
2003	2011	Iraq War; Part of the Iraqi conflict and the war on terror	Invasion (2003); Coalition of the willing; United States; United Kingdom; Australia; Poland; Kurdistan Region; KDP; PUK; Iraqi National Congress; Free Iraqi Forces; After invasion (2003–11); Iraq; United States; United Kingdom; MNF–I (2003–09); Kurdistan Region; Awakening Council	Invasion (2003); (Ba'athist Iraq) Republic of Iraq; After invasion (2003–11); Al-Qaeda in Iraq; Islamic Army in Iraq; Islamic State of Iraq; Mahdi Army; (Ba'athist Iraq) Naqshbandi Army; Hamas of Iraq; Jaysh al-Mujahideen; 1920 Revolution Brigades; Jamaat Ansar al-Sunna

== 2004 ==
Started	Ended	Name of conflict	Belligerents	
Started	Ended	Name of conflict	Victorious party (if applicable)	Defeated party (if applicable)
2004	2010	Sinaloa Cartel–Gulf Cartel conflict Part of the Mexican drug war (from 2006 to 2010)	Sinaloa cartel: Los Negros	Gulf cartel: Los Zetas
2004	Ongoing	South Thailand insurgency	Thailand: Royal Thai Armed Forces (RTARF); Royal Thai Police (RTP); Anti-Money Laundering Office (AMLO); Department of Provincial Administration (DOPA); Department of Special Investigation (DSI); Internal Security Operations Command (ISOC); National Intelligence Agency (NIA); Office of the Narcotics Control Board (ONCB); Southern Border Provinces Administrative Centre (SBPA); Supported by: Malaysia; Indonesia; Qatar; Bahrain; Turkey; Germany; New Zealand (forensic science); Australia (intelligence support); Russia (intelligence support); Canada (mine clearance); United States (CIA, EOD, K-9)	Barisan Revolusi Nasional; Runda Kumpulan Kecil; Gerakan Mujahidin Islam Patani; Islamic Front for the Liberation of Pattani; Pattani United Liberation Organisation; Former support: Free Aceh Movement (until 2005); Mayaki cartel (financial support); Jemaah Islamiyah (until 2024); Islamic State; East Asia Province; Drug cartels: Mayaki cartel; Xaysana cartel; Usman cartel; Oil smugglers Pirates
2004	Ongoing	Insurgency in Khyber Pakhtunkhwa Part of the war on terror and the spillover of the War in Afghanistan (2001–2021)	Pakistan; Pakistan Armed Forces; Pakistan Army; Pakistan Air Force; Special Forces: SSG; SSW; Civil Armed Forces; Frontier Corps; FC KPK North; FC KPK South; Pakistan Rangers; Pakistan Levies; Pakistan Police; Counter Terrorism Department; KPK Police; Frontier Constabulary; Dir Levies; Malakand Levies; Pakistani Intelligence community; NACTA; ISI; MI; FIA; United States (see Drone strikes in Pakistan, until 2018)	Insurgents; Pakistani Taliban; Jamaat-ul-Ahrar (Note: Until 2020, when it re-merged into the TTP.); TNSM (Note: Collaboration with the TTP in 2007.); Lashkar-e-Islam (Note: Collaboration with the TTP in 2015.); Tariq Gidar Group; Tehreek-e-Jihad Pakistan; Inqilab E Islami Pakistan (IIP); Hafiz Gul Bahadur Group; Jaish-e-Fursan-e-Muhammad; Al-Qaeda; Al-Qaeda in the Indian Subcontinent; Former belligerents: Jundallah (until 2014); Islamic Movement of Uzbekistan (until 2015); Turkistan Islamic Party (until 2015); Lashkar-e-Jhangvi (until 2024); Sipah-e-Sahaba (until 2018); Supported by: Afghanistan: Islamic State; Islamic State – Pakistan Province; Khorasan Province; Jundallah; IMU; Jamaat-ul-Ahrar
2004	Ongoing	Iran–PJAK conflict Part of the Kurdish separatism in Iran	Iran; Supported by: Turkey (allegedly, denied by Iran); United States (alleged by PJAK, since 2009)	Kurdistan Free Life Party (PJAK): Eastern Kurdistan Units (YRK); Women's Defence Forces (HPJ)
2003	Ongoing	Conflict in the Niger Delta	Nigerian government: Niger Delta Revolutionary Crusaders (since 2019); Nigerian Armed Forces; List: Abia State; Akwa Ibom State; Bayelsa State; Cross River State; Delta State; Edo State; Imo State; Ondo State; Rivers State; supported by: Belarus	Niger Delta Republic: Niger Delta Avengers (2016–present); Niger Delta Greenland Justice Mandate (2016–present); Joint Niger Delta Liberation Force (2016–present); Niger Delta Red Squad (2016–present); Adaka Boro Avengers (2016–present); Asawana Deadly Force of Niger Delta (2016–present); Niger Delta Revolutionary Crusaders (2016–present); New Delta Avengers (2017–present); Niger Delta Marine Force (2017–present); Reformed Egbesu Fraternities: Red Egbesu Water Lions (2016–present); Reformed Egbesu Boys of the Niger Delta (2016–present); Egbesu Mightier Fraternity (2016–present); (Republic of Biafra) Biafran separatists (from 2021): Movement for the Emancipation of the Niger Delta (2004–14); Niger Delta People's Volunteer Force (2003–09); Niger Delta Liberation Front (2005–14); Joint Revolutionary Council (2004–14); Niger Delta Vigilante (2004–09); Supported by: (Republic of Biafra) IPOB elements Bandits Pirates Nigerian mafia: Black Axe; The Outlaws; Eiye
2004	Ongoing	Kivu conflict Part of the aftermath of the Second Congo War	Pro-government: DR Congo; (Democratic Republic of the Congo) Wazalendo (March 2024–); NDC-R; Burundi; (United Nations) MONUSCO; Angola; Zimbabwe; Botswana (against FNL and FNL–Nzabampema); Supported by: France; Belgium; Bulgaria; Horațiu Potra's Mercenary Legion (until 31 Jan 2025)	Rwandan-aligned militias: CNDP; M23; Banyamulenge; Twigwaneho; Gumino; Ugandan-aligned militias: FPRI; FPLC; FPDC; Foreign state actors: Uganda; Rwanda; Anti-Ugandan forces: IS-CAP; ADF-Baluku; ADF-Mukulu; Mai-Mai Kyandenga; UPLC; Anti-Rwandan militias: FDLR; RUD-Urunana; Other Hutu-aligned forces; Nyatura; Anti-Burundi militias: RED-Tabara; FNL; Mai-Mai militias: NDC-R (until March 2024); FPP-AP; AFRC; RNL; Mazembe; Kifuafua; Simba; MAC; Raia Mutomboki; Buhirwa; Kidjangala; Fuliru Mai-Mai; Makanaki; Biloze Bishambuke; CNPSC; Alaise; CODECO (in Ituri); Chini ya Kilima–FPIC (in Ituri); (Zaire) Zaïre-FPAC (in Ituri)
2004	2014	Houthi insurgency Part of the Yemeni crisis and the Iran–Saudi Arabia proxy conflict	Houthi Movement Yemen (pro-Saleh forces)Alleged support by: Iran North Korea Libya (until 2011)	Yemen: Security Forces; Sunni tribes; Al-Islah militias; Saudi Arabia; Supported by: Jordan; Morocco al-Qaeda: Ansar al-Sharia
2004	2007	Central African Bush War	Central African Republic; Chad	Rebels: Union of Democratic Forces for Unity (UFDR); People's Army for the Restoration of Democracy (APRD); Convention of Patriots for Justice and Peace (CPJP); Movement of Central African Liberators for Justice (MLCJ)...and others: Patriotic Convention for Saving the Country (CPSK); Democratic Front of the Central African People (FDPC); FDC; GALPC; FPR
2004	Ongoing	Sistan and Baluchestan insurgency Part of the larger Insurgency in Balochistan	Iran	Current: Jaish ul-Adl (2013–present); Ansar Al-Furqan (2013–present); BLA; BLF; Former: Jundallah (2004–2011); Harakat Ansar (2012–2013)

== 2005 ==
Started	Ended	Name of conflict	Belligerents	
Started	Ended	Name of conflict	Victorious party (if applicable)	Defeated party (if applicable)
2005	2005	2005 Bangladesh India border clash	India	Bangladesh
2005	Ongoing	Insurgency in Paraguay	Paraguay: Armed forces; Police; Joint Task Force (FTC); Supported by: United States; Colombia Justicieros de la Frontera	Paraguayan People's Army (EPP); Armed Peasant Association (ACA) (Note: ACA was active from 2014 until 2016, when most of its members and leaders were killed. The group was effectively defunct after this point, but was revived sometime in 2017 by members of the EML.); Army of Marshal López (EML) (from 2016); Supported by: FARC (until 2016); Manuel Rodríguez Patriotic Front (alleged); Primeiro Comando da Capital; Comando Vermelho
2005	2010	Chadian Civil War (2005–2010)	Chad; France; Libya (Sudan) NMRD (Note: Inglés National Movement for Reform and Development); JEM (Note: Inglés Justice and Equality Movement); Supported by: Ukraine; Israel; Romania	Rebels: FUC (Note: Francés Front uni pour le changement); UFDD (Note: Francés Union des forces pour la démocratie et le développement); RFD (Note: Francés Rassemblement des forces pour le changement); CNT (Note: Francés Concorde Nationale Tchadienne); CDR (Note: Francés Conseil démocratique révolutionnaire); UFDP (Note: Francés Union des Forces Démocratiques pour le Progrès); RDL (Note: Francés Rassemblement pour la démocratie et la liberté); UFDD-F (Note: Francés Union des Forces pour la démocratie et le développement-Fondamentale); SCUD (Note: Francés Socle pour le changement, l'unité et la démocratie); CNR (Note: Francés Conseil National du Redressement); URF (Note: Francés Union des forces de la résistance); UFCD (Note: Francés Union des forces pour le changement et la démocratie); FSR (Note: Francés Front pour le salut de la République); UFR (Note: Francés Union des Forces de Résistance); UMC (Note: Alianza formada en 2008 por el UFDD, el UFDD-F y el RFC.); FPRN (Note: Francés Front populaire pour la renaissance nationale); UDC (Note: Francés Union démocratique pour le changement); MPRD (Note: Francés Mouvement Populaire pour la Renaissance et le Developpement); (Sudan) Janjaweed; Alleged support: Sudan (until 2010)
2005	2008	Mount Elgon insurgency	Kenya Defence Forces	Sabaot Land Defence Force

== 2006–2009 ==
Started	Ended	Name of conflict	Belligerents	
Started	Ended	Name of conflict	Victorious party (if applicable)	Defeated party (if applicable)
2006	Ongoing	Fatah–Hamas conflict Part of the Palestinian internal political violence	Hamas; (Palestine) Gaza Strip (after June 2007); Supported by: Iran	Fatah; (Palestine) Palestinian Authority; Al-Aqsa Martyrs' Brigades (until 2007) (Note: The Al-Aqsa Martyrs' Brigades was Fatah's armed wing, and while still aligned with Fatah in terms of political ideology, is now a member of the Palestinian Joint Operations Room and allied with Hamas. The AAMB separated from Fatah after Mahmoud Abbas' 2007 decree banning all militias following the Battle of Gaza. Nonetheless, it sometimes still presents itself as the party's armed wing, an association rejected by Fatah leadership.); Supported by: United States (alleged); United Kingdom (covert)
2006	2008	Iraqi civil war (2006–2008) Part of the Iraq War	Iraq; United States; United Kingdom; Other coalition forces Private Security Contractors (Kurdistan Region) Peshmerga; Sons of Iraq	Mahdi Army (until 2008); Special Groups: Asa'ib Ahl al-Haq; Kata'ib Hezbollah; Promised Day Brigades (from 2008); Badr Brigades Soldiers of Heaven Other militias Shia tribes; Al-Qaeda: Al-Qaeda in Iraq (until January 2006); Mujahideen Shura Council (January 2006 – October 2006); Islamic State of Iraq (from October 2006); Islamic Army in Iraq; Ansar al-Sunna (Ba'athist Iraq) Naqshbandi Army; Other militias Sunni tribes
2006	2013	Operation Astute Part of the 2006 East Timorese crisis	Australia; New Zealand; Malaysia; Portugal; East Timor (government troops); United Nations soldiers	Renegade elements of the FDTL
2006	2018	Bakassi conflict Part of the conflict in the Niger Delta and the piracy in the Gulf of Guinea	Cameroon	Democratic Republic of Bakassi Niger Delta militias Pro-Nigerian militias
2006	2006	2006 Lebanon War Part of the Israeli–Lebanese conflict, the Iran–Israel proxy conflict and the war on terror	Israel	Hezbollah Allies: Amal; Popular Guard; PFLP-GC; Iran (Ynet report); ICU (U.N. report)
2006	2009	Eelam War IV Part of the Sri Lankan Civil War	Sri Lanka; Supported by Pakistan	Liberation Tigers of Tamil Eelam
2006	Ongoing	Mexican drug war Part of the war on drugs	Mexico; Armed Forces; National Guard (2019–present); Federal Police (2006–2019); State and municipal police forces; Consulting and training support: United States; Mérida Initiative; Colombia; National Police of Colombia; Australia; Australian Federal Police; Canada; RCMP ACCBP; Philippines; National Bureau of Investigation; Non-state armed groups: Popular Revolutionary Army (EPR); Zapatistas (EZLN); Self-defense groups	Principal Mexican cartels: Gulf Cartel; Los Metros; Los Rojos; Sinaloa Cartel; Los Chapitos; La Mayiza; CJNG; LNFM; Los Viagras; Northeast Cartel; Los Zetas; United Cartels; Other cartels: LFM; CSRL; Juárez Cartel; Tijuana Cartel; La Barredora; La Unión Tepito; Dismantled cartels: Milenio Cartel (1980–2010); Beltrán-Leyva Cartel (1996–2017); Independent Cartel of Acapulco (2010–2014); Knights Templar Cartel (2010–2017); Support: Mexican Narcosystem; Organized crime in Italy; (Albania) Albanian mafia; Mexican Mafia; Mara Salvatrucha
2006	2009	War in Somalia (2006–2009) Part of the Ethiopian–Somali conflict and the Somali Civil War	Invasion: Ethiopia; (Somalia) TFG; United States Supported by: Kenya; Insurgency: Ethiopia; (Somalia) TFG; Puntland; Galmudug; ASWJ United States; AMISOM: Burundi; Kenya; Malawi; Nigeria; Uganda	Invasion: Islamic Courts Union; Supported by: ONLF; Eritrea Insurgency: Al-Shabaab; (Somalia) ARS; Ras Kamboni Brigades; Jabhatul Islamiya; Muaskar Anole; ICU loyalists
2007	Ongoing	Operation Juniper Shield Part of the global war on terrorism (Islamist insurgency in the Sahel)	Algeria; Morocco; Mauritania; Tunisia; Burkina Faso; Chad; Mali; Niger; Nigeria; Senegal; Cameroon; Togo; Ghana; Ivory Coast; Benin; Cape Verde (The Gambia) Gambia; Guinea; Guinea-Bissau; Liberia; Sierra Leone Supported and trained By: United States; Canada; France; Germany; Netherlands; Spain; United Kingdom; Denmark; Czech Republic; Sweden	Islamic militants; al-Qaeda; Jama'at Nasr al-Islam wal Muslimin; MOJWA (until 2013); AQIM; Al-Mourabitoun (until 2017); Ansar al-Sharia; Macina Liberation Front; Ansar Dine (until 2017); Boko Haram (partially aligned with ISIL since 2015); Ansaru; ISIL; Islamic State in the Greater Sahara (2015–present); Islamic State – West Africa Province
2007	2009	Tuareg rebellion (2007–2009) Part of the Tuareg rebellions and Operation Juniper Shield	Niger; Mali	In Niger: Niger Movement for Justice; Front of Forces for Rectification (2008 split); Niger Patriotic Front (2009 split); In Mali: ADC; ATNM (2008 split)
2007	2007	2007 Lebanon conflict Part of the war on terror	(Lebanon) Lebanese Armed Forces (Lebanon) Internal Security Forces; Supported by: United States	Fatah al-Islam; Jund al-Sham
2007	2007	Battle of Gaza (2007) Part of the Fatah–Hamas conflict	Hamas	Fatah; Palestinian Authority; Supported by: United States (alleged by Hamas)
2007	2015	Insurgency in Ingushetia Part of the Second Chechen War and North Caucasus Insurgency	Russia: Ingushetia	Chechen Republic of Ichkeria (until October 2007): Caucasian Front (until October 2007); Caucasus Emirate (from October 2007): Vilayat Galgayche (from October 2007); (Ingushetia) Ingush opposition (2007–2008) ad hoc revenge groups
2008	2008	2008 invasion of Anjouan	African Union: Comoros; Senegal; Sudan; Tanzania; Supported by: France (logistical support); Libyan Arab Jamahiriya (logistical support)	Anjouan
2008	2008	2008 Lebanon conflict	(United Arab Republic) March 8 Alliance: Hezbollah; Amal Movement; LDP; SSNP; Arab Democratic Party	March 14 Alliance: Future Movement; Progressive Socialist Party
2008	2008	Djiboutian–Eritrean border conflict	Eritrea	Djibouti; Supported by: France
2008	2011	2008–2011 Cambodian–Thai border crisis	Cambodia	Thailand
2008	2008	2008 Bangladesh India border clash	Bangladesh	India cattle smuggler
2008	2008	Russo-Georgian War Part of the post–Cold War era, Abkhazia conflict, the Georgian–Ossetian conflict, and the post-Soviet conflicts	Russia; South Ossetia (Note: South Ossetia's status is disputed. It considers itself to be an independent state, but this is recognised by only a few other countries. The Georgian government and most of the world's other states consider South Ossetia de jure a part of Georgia's territory.); Abkhazia (Note: The political status of Abkhazia is disputed. Having unilaterally declared independence from Georgia in 1992, Abkhazia is formally recognised as an independent state by 4 UN member states (three other states previously recognised it but then withdrew their recognition), while the remainder of the international community recognizes it as de jure Georgian territory. Georgia continues to claim the area as its own territory, designating it as Russian-occupied territory.)	Georgia
2008	2008	2008 Kufra conflict	Libya	Toubou Front for the Salvation of Libya
2008	2009	Gaza War Part of the Gaza–Israel conflict	Israel; Israel Defense Forces; Israel Security Agency	Gaza Strip; Hamas; (Hamas) Ezzedeen al-Qassam Brigades; Popular Front for the Liberation of Palestine; (Popular Front for the Liberation of Palestine) Abu Ali Mustapha Brigades; Islamic Jihad Movement in Palestine; (Palestinian Islamic Jihad) Al-Quds Brigades; Al-Aqsa Martyrs' Brigades; Popular Resistance Committees
2009	Ongoing	Somali Civil War (2009–present) Part of the Somali Civil War, conflicts in the Horn of Africa, the Ethiopian–Somali conflict, war against the Islamic State, Operation Enduring Freedom – Horn of Africa, and global war on terrorism	Somalia; Somali Armed Forces; Regional forces: Galmudug; Galmudug Security Force; Ahlu Sunna Waljama'a (until 2018); (Somalia) Ma'awisley; Hirshabelle; Khatumo; Southwestern Somalia; Himan and Heeb (until 2015); United States: U.S. Army; U.S. Marine Corps; U.S. Air Force; U.S. Navy; CIA; AFRICOM; China: People's Armed Police; AUSSOM (2025–present): Burundi (under discussion); Djibouti; Egypt (under discussion); Ethiopia; Kenya; Uganda; ATMIS (2022–2024): Burundi; Djibouti; Ethiopia; Kenya; Uganda; AMISOM (2007–2022): Burundi; Djibouti; Ethiopia; Ghana; Kenya; Nigeria; Sierra Leone; Uganda; Supported by: France; Italy; Russia; Turkey; UAE; United Kingdom Non-combat support: European Union; EUTM Somalia; (United Nations) UNPOS (1995–2013) (United Nations) UNSOM (2013–2024): Brazil; Finland; Germany; Ghana; India; Indonesia; Nepal; Sierra Leone; Sweden; Thailand; Turkey; Uganda; United Kingdom; Zimbabwe; (United Nations) UNTMIS (2025–present) (United Nations) UNSOA (2009–2016) (United Nations) UNSOS (2016–present) Independent regional forces Puntland: Puntland Security Force; Puntland Dervish Force; Puntland Maritime Police Force; Jubaland: Jubaland Dervish Force; Raskamboni Movement	Al-Qaeda and allies; Al-Shabaab; AQAP; AQIM; Hizbul Islam (until 2010; 2012–2013) Alleged state allies: Eritrea; Iran; Quds Force; Alleged non-state allies: Houthis: Islamic State (since 2015); Somalia Wilayah; Allies; IS-YP; Somali pirates: Somaliland; Somaliland Armed Forces; SSB; Alleged support: Ethiopia; United Arab Emirates
2008	Ongoing	Sudanese nomadic conflicts Part of the Sudanese Civil Wars	Non-Arab tribes (including Dinka, Nuer, and Murle tribes)	Baggara Arabs (mainly Rizeigat and Messiria tribes)
2009	2017	Insurgency in the North Caucasus Part of the Chechen–Russian conflict, post-Soviet conflicts and the War against the Islamic State (from 2014)	Russia List: Astrakhan Oblast; Bashkortostan; Chechnya; Dagestan; Ingushetia; Kabardino-Balkaria; Karachay-Cherkessia; Moscow; North Ossetia–Alania; Novgorod Oblast; Saint Petersburg; Stavropol Krai; Volgograd Oblast; Kadyrovtsy; Other loyalists	Caucasus Emirate (2009–17) List: Vilayat Dagestan; Vilayat Galgayche; Vilayat Iriston (2009); Vilayat KBK (2009–17); Vilayat Nokhchicho; Riyad-us Saliheen Brigade (2009–16); Arab Mujahideen (2009–12); Turkish Mujahideen (2009–17) Imam Shamil Battalion (2017); Islamic State: Wilayat al-Qawqaz
2009	2009	2009 Peruvian political crisis	Government of Peru: Peruvian National Police	AIDESEP
2009	Ongoing	Boko Haram insurgency Part of the religious violence in Nigeria, the war against the Islamic State, the Islamist insurgency in the Sahel, and the war on terror	Nigeria: Multinational Joint Task Force; Local militias and vigilantes; Foreign mercenaries; Sultan Murad Division (from 2024); Supported by: United States; Russia; China; France; United Kingdom; African Union; Turkey; Pakistan; Canada; Egypt; Israel; European Union; Colombia; Belarus	(Islamic State) Boko Haram (2009-2015): Ansaru (2009-2012); Islamic State: (Islamic State) Boko Haram (2015-2016); (Islamic State) ISWAP (2016–present, originally Barnawi faction of Boko Haram); (Islamic State) ISSP; Lakurawa (2016–present); al-Qaeda: Ansaru (2012–present) (Note: The exact origin of Ansaru is unclear, but it had already existed as Boko Haram faction before officially announcing its foundation as separate group on 1 January 2012. The group had no known military presence in Nigeria from 2015, but several of its members appear to be still active. The group appear allied with rag-tag factions in the Nigerian bandit conflict and were recently behind the Abuja–Kaduna train attack); Supported by: Al-Shabaab; AQIM (Islamic State) Boko Haram (2016–present) (Note: Following Mohammed Yusuf's death, Boko Haram splintered into numerous factions which no longer operated under a unified leadership. Though Abubakar Shekau eventually became the preeminent commander of the movement, he never really controlled all Boko Haram groups. Instead, the factions were loosely allied, but also occasionally clashed with each other. This situation changed in 2015 when Shekau pledged allegiance to ISIL. The leadership of ISIL eventually decided to replace Shekau as a local commander with Yusuf's son Abu Musab al-Barnawi, whereupon the movement split completely. Shekau no longer recognized the authority of ISIL's central command, and his loyalists started to openly fight the followers of al-Barnawi. Regardless, Shekau did never officially renounce his pledge of allegiance to ISIL as a whole; his forces are thus occasionally regarded as "second branch of ISWAP". Overall, the relation of Shekau with ISIL remains confused and ambiguous. In the Battle of Sambisa Forest of 2021 ISWAP fighters killed Shekau and al-Barnawi nominally remains head of ISWAP): Shekau faction; Several minor factions
2009	2009	2009 Boko Haram uprising Part of the Boko Haram insurgency	Nigerian Government	Boko Haram
2009	2026	South Yemen insurgency Part of the Yemeni Crisis (2011–present) and the Yemeni civil war (2014–present)	Government: Yemen Army; Yemeni Republican Guard; Yemeni Air Force; Yemen Paramilitary; Pro-government tribes: Al-Islah militias; Supported by: Saudi Arabia	(South Yemen) Southern Transitional Council (since 2017): Southern Movement; Southern Resistance; Security Belt; Supported by: United Arab Emirates
2009	2010	Operation Scorched Earth Part of the Houthi insurgency in Yemen and Iran–Saudi Arabia proxy conflict	Yemen; Hashed tribesmen Saudi Arabia; Alleged support: Morocco; Jordan	HouthisAlleged support: Iran: Quds Force; Hezbollah
2009	2009	Dongo conflict	Democratic Republic of the Congo; Supported by: (United Nations) MONUC; Rwanda (alleged)	Lobala rebels Possibly: Resistance Patriots of Dongo

== Sources ==
- Threat Tactics Report: Boko Haram (TRADOC G-2) (PDF). Fort Eustis: United States Army Training and Doctrine Command. 2015.
- "Curbing Violence in Nigeria (II): The Boko Haram Insurgency" (PDF). Africa Report (216). Brussels: International Crisis Group. 3 April 2014. Archived from the original (PDF) on 17 January 2016.
- "Watchmen of Lake Chad: Vigilante Groups Fighting Boko Haram" (PDF). Africa Report (244). Brussels: International Crisis Group. 23 February 2018. Archived from the original (PDF) on 11 March 2022.
- Warner, Jason; Hulme, Charlotte (2018). "The Islamic State in Africa: Estimating Fighter Numbers in Cells Across the Continent" (PDF). CTC Sentinel. 11 (7). West Point, New York: Combating Terrorism Center: 21–28. Archived from the original (PDF) on 8 August 2019.
