= Lists of wars =

Lists of wars throughout history

This article provides a list of articles which contain a list of war and conflicts. There are various sets of such lists, based upon different criteria for grouping individual wars, as shown below.

== Lists based on statistics ==
- List of number of conflicts per year

== Lists based on fatalities ==
- List of wars by death toll
- List of most lethal battles in world history

== Lists based on specific historical criteria ==
=== Lists based on time period ===
Below is a set of articles which each provide a list of wars within a specific time period, each covering at least several decades or more.

- List of wars: before 1000
- List of wars: 1000–1499
- List of wars: 1500–1799
- List of wars: 1800–1899
- List of wars: 1900–1944
- List of wars: 1945–1989
- List of wars: 1990–1999
- List of wars: 2000-2009
- List of wars: 2010–2019
- List of wars: 2020–present
- List of ongoing armed conflicts
- List of wars by duration

=== Lists by region ===
- List of conflicts in North America
  - List of conflicts in the United States
- List of conflicts in Central America
- List of conflicts in South America
- List of conflicts in Europe
- List of conflicts in Asia
  - List of wars involving Iran
  - List of Chinese wars and battles
- Conflicts in the Middle East
  - List of conflicts in the Near East (until 1918)
  - List of modern conflicts in the Middle East (after 1918)
- List of conflicts in Africa
  - Conflicts in the Horn of Africa (East Africa)
  - List of modern conflicts in North Africa (Maghreb)
  - Military history of Africa
- List of conflicts in Australia

== Lists based on type of conflict ==
- List of wars of independence
- List of wars of national liberation
- List of military conflicts spanning multiple wars
- List of world wars
- List of border conflicts
- List of border wars
- List of wars extended by diplomatic irregularity
- List of wars of succession
- List of civil wars
- List of proxy wars
- List of invasions
- List of interstate wars since 1945
- List of terrorist incidents
  - List of active rebel groups
  - List of rebel groups that control territory
  - List of designated terrorist organizations

== Lists based on battles ==
- Lists of battles
  - List of orders of battle
  - List of battles by casualties
- List of sieges

== See also ==
  - List of wars extended by diplomatic irregularity
  - Uppsala Conflict Data Program
  - Failed state
- Ongoing conflicts in World (Commons Maps) :
  - List of ongoing armed conflicts
  - List of wars 2011–present
    - Ongoing military conflicts
    - Maps of ongoing conflicts

=== General history ===
- Human history
- Military history

=== Military history articles by region ===
- Military history of Europe

=== Categories ===
- Category: Military history by continent
- Category: Military history by country
- Category: Military history by period
