= CPSK =

CPSK may refer to:

- Patriotic Convention for Saving the Country, a militia in the Central African Republic (from its French/Sango name Convention Patriotique pour le Salut du Kodro)
- Coherent Phase-shift keying, digital modulation scheme
