= List of interstate wars since 1945 =

Post-1945 military conflicts over territory

Deaths in interstate conflicts based on where they occurred

This is a list of interstate wars since 1945. Interstate warfare has been defined as military conflict between separate states over a territory, including irregular military forces legitimized by the laws of war applicable to interstate wars due to the invasion or annexation being unlawful. This does not include civil wars and wars of independence, or smaller clashes with limited casualties (fewer than 100 combat deaths). The largest interstate war in history, World War II, involved most of the world's countries, after which the United Nations (UN) was established in 1945 to foster international co-operation and prevent future conflicts. The post-WWII era has, in general, been characterized by the absence of direct, major wars between great powers, such as the United States and (until 1991) the Soviet Union.

== 1945–1989 ==
Denotes war with more than 10,000 combat deaths at minimum

Start	Finish	Name of conflict	States in conflict		Combat deaths	
Start	Finish	Name of conflict	States in conflict		Min estimate	Max estimate
November 1945	15 December 1946	Iran crisis of 1946	Iran	Azerbaijan People's Government Republic of Mahabad	2,000+	
22 October 1947	5 January 1949	Indo-Pakistani War of 1947	India	Pakistan	2,604	7,500
14 May 1948	10 March 1949	1948 Arab–Israeli War	Israel	Egypt; Iraq; Transjordan; Syria; Lebanon; Saudi Arabia; Yemen	13,073	26,373
13 September 1948	18 September 1948	Operation Polo	India	Hyderabad	32,190	202,190
25 June 1950	27 July 1953	Korean War	UN Command; South Korea; United States; United Kingdom; Australia; Belgium; Canada; France; Philippines; Colombia; Ethiopia; Greece; Luxembourg; Netherlands; New Zealand; South Africa; Thailand; Turkey	North Korea; China; Soviet Union	2,568,927	4,096,927
6 October 1950	24 October 1950	Chinese invasion of Tibet	China	Tibet	294	5,814
3 September 1954	1 May 1955	First Taiwan Strait Crisis	China	Republic of China United States	914	1,054
29 October 1956	7 November 1956	Suez Crisis	Israel United Kingdom; France	Egypt	2,848	4,198
1 November 1956	4 November 1956	Soviet invasion of Hungary; Part of the Hungarian Revolution of 1956	Soviet Union	Hungary	3,222	
23 October 1957	30 June 1958	Ifni War	Spain France	Morocco	1,197	
23 August 1958	2 December 1958	Second Taiwan Strait Crisis	Republic of China United States	China	1,054	
17 April 1961	20 April 1961	Bay of Pigs Invasion	Cuba	United States (Note: Covertly, limited): DRF	2,298	
19 July 1961	23 July 1961	Bizerte crisis	France	Tunisia	654	657
19 December 1961	15 August 1962	Operation Trikora	Indonesia	Netherlands	223	
20 October 1962	21 November 1962	Sino-Indian War	China	India	2,105	6,197
20 January 1963	11 August 1966	Indonesia–Malaysia confrontation	Malaysia; Singapore; United Kingdom; Australia; New Zealand	Indonesia	874	
25 September 1963	20 February 1964	Sand War	Morocco	Algeria	69	500
26 February 1964	6 April 1964	1964 Ethiopian–Somali Border War	Ethiopia	Somalia	1,000	2,000
8 March 1965	29 March 1973	Vietnam War	North Vietnam; FNL; Khmer Rouge; Khmer Issarak; Pathet Lao; China; North Korea; Soviet Union	South Vietnam; United States (Note: After 8 March 1965.); South Korea (Note: From 11 September 1964 to 23 March 1973.); Thailand; Australia (Note: From June 1965 to 12 March 1972.); New Zealand (Note: From July 1965 to 9 December 1971.); Laos; Khmer Republic; Philippines	1,326,494	3,447,494
5 August 1965	23 September 1965	Indo-Pakistani War of 1965	India	Pakistan	6,800	13,459
5 October 1966	3 December 1969	Korean DMZ Conflict	South Korea; United States	North Korea	739	
5 June 1967	10 June 1967	Six-Day War	Israel	Egypt; Syria; Jordan; Arab Expeditionary Forces: Iraq; Saudi Arabia Morocco; Algeria; Libya; Kuwait; Tunisia; Sudan	12,336	19,264
1 July 1967	7 August 1970	War of Attrition	Israel	Egypt; Soviet Union; Cuba; Jordan; Syria	6,442	14,290
20 August 1968	21 August 1968	Warsaw Pact invasion of Czechoslovakia	Soviet Union; Bulgaria; East Germany; Hungary; Poland	Czechoslovakia	254	
14 July 1969	18 July 1969	Football War	El Salvador	Honduras	3,000	
3 December 1971	16 December 1971	Indo-Pakistani War of 1971	India	Pakistan	11,500	12,843
6 October 1973	25 October 1973	Yom Kippur War	Israel	Egypt; Syria; Combat support: Iraq; Jordan; Algeria; Cuba; Morocco	10,521	21,300
20 July 1974	18 August 1974	Turkish invasion of Cyprus	Turkey	Cyprus; Greece	6,009	9,509
April 1974	March 1975	1974–75 Shatt al-Arab conflict	Iran	Iraq	1,000+	
30 October 1975	6 September 1991	Western Sahara War	Morocco Mauritania France	Sahrawi Arab Democratic Republic Algeria	10,000	20,000
7 December 1975	17 July 1976	Indonesian invasion of East Timor	Indonesia	East Timor	51,000+	
13 July 1977	23 March 1978	Ogaden War	Ethiopia; Cuba; South Yemen; Soviet Union	Somalia	39,836	
21 July 1977	24 July 1977	Egyptian–Libyan War	Egypt	Libya	500	
29 January 1978	11 September 1987	Chadian–Libyan War	Chad; France	Libya	8,500+	
9 October 1978	3 June 1979	Uganda–Tanzania War	Tanzania; Mozambique	Uganda; Libya	4,135	4,323
21 December 1978	26 September 1989	Cambodian–Vietnamese War	Vietnam; People's Republic of Kampuchea	Democratic Kampuchea; Thailand	270,000	297,000
17 February 1979	16 March 1979	Sino-Vietnamese War	Vietnam	China	36,945	175,000
24 February 1979	19 March 1979	Yemenite War of 1979	North Yemen	South Yemen	1,084	
16 March 1979	1 November 1991	Sino-Vietnamese conflicts (1979–1991)	Vietnam	China	6,000	
24 December 1979	15 February 1989	Soviet–Afghan War	Soviet Union; Afghanistan	Afghan Mujahideen; Afghan Interim Government (Note: From 1988); Pakistan (Note: Covertly)	600,000	2,000,000
22 September 1980	20 August 1988	Iran–Iraq War	Iran	Iraq; United States (Note: From 19 October 1987 to 18 April 1988.)	405,000	1,200,000
2 April 1982	14 June 1982	Falklands War	United Kingdom	Argentina	907	
June 1982	August 1982	1982 Ethiopian–Somali Border War	Somalia	Ethiopia		
6 June 1982	5 June 1985	1982 Lebanon War	Israel	PLO; Syria	19,085+	
18 April 1983	April 1983	Chadian–Nigerian War	Nigeria	Chad	100+	
25 October 1983	29 October 1983	Invasion of Grenada	United States; Antigua and Barbuda; Barbados; Dominica; Jamaica; Saint Lucia; Saint Vincent and the Grenadines	Grenada; Cuba	102	
25 December 1985	30 December 1985	Agacher Strip War	Mali	Burkina Faso	142	
20 February 1988	12 May 1994	First Nagorno-Karabakh War	Nagorno-Karabakh Republic; Armenia	Azerbaijan	37,413	56,000
9 April 1989	18 July 1991	Mauritania–Senegal Border War	Mauritania	Senegal	200+	
20 December 1989	31 January 1990	United States invasion of Panama	United States	Panama	540	3,338

== 1990–present ==
Denotes war with more than 10,000 combat deaths at minimum

Start	Finish	Name of conflict	States in conflict		Combat deaths	
Start	Finish	Name of conflict	States in conflict		Min, estimate	Max, estimate
2 August 1990	28 February 1991	Persian Gulf War	Kuwait; United States; United Kingdom; Saudi Arabia; France; Italy; Canada; Australia; Egypt; Syria; Qatar	Iraq	29,231	59,231
2 November 1990	21 July 1992	Transnistria War	Moldova	Transnistria Russia	316	637
5 January 1991	24 June 1992	South Ossetia war (1991–1992)	Georgia	South Ossetia Russia	1,000+	
20 September 1991	3 January 1992	Croatian War of Independence	Croatia	Yugoslavia	5,040	7,279
6 April 1992	19 May 1992	Bosnian War	Bosnia and Herzegovina	Yugoslavia (Note: Until 27 April 1992.); Serbia and Montenegro (Note: After 27 April 1992.): Republika Srpska	25,000	329,000
14 August 1992	27 September 1993	War in Abkhazia (1992–1993)	Abkhazia Russia	Georgia	10,000	30,000
26 January 1995	28 February 1995	Cenepa War	Peru	Ecuador	84	410
24 October 1996	16 May 1997	First Congo War	AFDL Rwanda Uganda Burundi Angola SPLA Eritrea	Zaire Sudan Chad Ex-FAR/ALiR Interahamwe CNDD-FDD UNITA ADF FLNC	235,000	250,000
28 February 1998	10 June 1999	Kosovo War	Kosova; NATO (Note: After 24 March 1999.)	Yugoslavia	16,056	16,879
3 May 1998	18 June 2000	Eritrean–Ethiopian War	Ethiopia	Eritrea	53,000	300,000
3 May 1999	26 July 1999	Kargil War	India	Pakistan	884	5,600
7 August 1999	30 April 2000	Second Chechen War	Russia	Ichkeria	20,000	
5 June 2000	10 June 2000	African Six-Day War; Part of the Second Congo War	Rwanda	Uganda	4,051+	
7 October 2001	17 December 2001	United States invasion of Afghanistan; Part of the Afghan conflict	United States; United Kingdom; Canada; Australia; Afghanistan: Northern Alliance	Islamic Emirate of Afghanistan	9,550	14,388
19 March 2003	1 May 2003	2003 invasion of Iraq	United States; United Kingdom; Australia; Poland	Iraq	10,996	53,016
28 June 2006	Ongoing	Gaza–Israel conflict	Israel	Gaza Strip	42,783	
1 August 2008	12 August 2008	Russo-Georgian War	Russia: South Ossetia; Abkhazia	Georgia	730	737
19 March 2011	31 October 2011	2011 military intervention in Libya; Part of the First Libyan Civil War	NATO; Qatar; Sweden; United Arab Emirates	Libya	72	403+
26 March 2012	26 September 2012	Heglig Crisis	Sudan	South Sudan	316	1,485
20 February 2014	Ongoing	Russo-Ukrainian War (outline)	Ukraine	Russia: DPR (Note: Until 30 September 2022.); LPR (Note: Until 30 September 2022.); North Korea	400,000	650,000+
27 September 2020	10 November 2020	Second Nagorno-Karabakh War	Azerbaijan	Armenia: Artsakh	7,726	
27 March 2022	27 June 2025	Democratic Republic of the Congo–Rwanda conflict (2022–present)	Democratic Republic of the Congo	Rwanda: March 23 Movement	7,000+	
7 May 2025	10 May 2025	2025 India–Pakistan conflict	India	Pakistan	83	210
13 June 2025	24 June 2025	Twelve-Day War	Israel United States	Iran Houthis	1,091	1,226
21 February 2026	Ongoing	2026 Afghanistan–Pakistan war	Pakistan	Afghanistan	100	457
28 February 2026	Ongoing	Iran War	Israel; United States	Iran	3,411	9,114+

== See also ==
- List of wars: 1945–1989
- List of wars: 1990–2002
- List of wars: 2003–2019
- List of wars: 2020–present
