= Niger Delta Greenland Justice Mandate =

Militant organisation in Nigeria

- Dates active: 2 August 2016 - present
- Headquarters: Delta State
- Ideology: Regionalism
- Wars: Conflict in the Niger Delta

The Niger Delta Greenland Justice Mandate (NDGJM) is a militant group operating in Nigeria's Niger Delta region. The group was founded on 2 August 2016 in Delta State and is composed mainly of ethnic Urhobos, and a fairly large number of members belonging to the Isoko ethnic group.

Following the ceasefire declared by their close allies, the Niger Delta Avengers, on 27 August 2016 the NDGJM is now the most active of all the Niger Delta rebel groups, having carried out numerous attacks on oil producing facilities since their founding in early August. The group has also issued numerous statements, mocking the Nigerian military's so-called "Operation Crocodile Smiles", commenced on 30 August, calling it a scam and nothing more than a propaganda stunt aiming to call back all the foreign oil corporations that have ceased operations in the delta since the NDA's bombing campaign of mid-2016.

On 13 October 2016 the group released a statement declaring total war on the Nigerian government, code-named "Operation Hammurabi Code", and warns that all Nigerian soldiers and foreign multinational corporation associates will be mercilessly rooted out and eliminated if found to be operating in the delta.

== Timeline of activities ==
=== 2016 ===
- 10 August – NDGJM militants blew up the Uzere-Eriemu crude oil trunkline, owned by the Nigerian Petroleum Development Company, located in Isoko South LGA, Delta State. The trunkline fed large quantities of crude oil to the Eriemu Manifold prior to its destruction.
- 19 August – At approximately 2:00am NDGJM militants blew up two crude oil pipelines belonging to the Nigerian Petroleum Development Company located near the village of Owhrode, Udu LGA, Delta State. A huge ball of fire could be seen rising from the scene of the explosion for miles around.
- 30 August – At approximately 3:00am the NDGJM Uproot Strike Team B blew up the Ogor-Oteri crude oil pipeline, owned by the Nigerian Petroleum Development Company, located in Delta State.
- 13 September – At approximately 1:00am NDGJM militants blew up the Afiesere-Iwhrenene crude oil pipeline, owned by the Nigerian Petroleum Development Company, located in Ughelli North LGA, Delta State.
- 18 September – At approximately 11:30pm NDGJM militants blew up the Afiesere-Ekiugbo crude oil pipeline, owned by the Nigerian Petroleum Development Company, located in Ughelli North LGA, Delta State.
- 29 September – At approximately 1:00am the NDGJM Opudo Strike Team blew up the Unenurhie-Evwreni crude oil pipeline, owned by the Nigerian Petroleum Development Company, in two separate locations, with one detonation taking place in Ughelli North LGA and another in Ughelli South LGA.
- 13 October – At approximately 9:00pm the NDGJM Akuma Strike Team blew up the Iwhremaro-Ughelli Quality Control Center crude oil pipeline, declaring that they have also commenced Operation Hammurabi Code in response to the Nigerian Army's so called Operation Crocodile Smiles. The Iwhremaro-Ughelli QCC pipeline, operated and owned by the Nigerian Petroleum Development Company, plays host to 4 separate crude oil tank farms, receives crude from 6 oil fields within the Oil Mining Lease 30 area of Delta State, and feeds oil to the Forcados terminal as well as refineries located in Warri and Kaduna.
- 14 October – At approximately 11:00pm the NDGJM Akuma Strike Team blew up the Oviri-Ogor crude oil pipeline, owned by the Nigerian Petroleum Development Company, located near the shoreline in Ughelli South LGA. The Oviri-Ogor pipeline fed oil directly to the Iwhremaro-Ughelli QCC pipeline that was destroyed by the same NDGJM strike team 26 hours prior.
- 30 October – The NDGJM Akuma Strike Team blew up the 32-inch Effurun-Otor natural gas pipeline, operated by the Nigerian Petroleum Development Company, located in Uvwie LGA, Delta State. The Effurun-Otor pipeline directly linked to the Utorogu Gas Plant, a gas plant that converts natural gasses, such as methane, into electric currents in order to supply some of Lagos' suburbs with electricity.
- 1 November – NDGJM militants blew up a section of the Trans Forcados crude oil pipeline, owned and operated by Royal Dutch Shell, near Warri, Delta State. The Trans Forcados crude oil pipeline feeds huge amounts of crude oil everyday to the Forcados Export Terminal, capable of operating at 400,000/BPD at maximum capacity.
- 8 November – In the early hours of 8 November an NDGJM strike team blew up a section of the Trans Forcados crude oil pipeline, owned by Royal Dutch Shell, rendering the pipeline inoperable. Civilians reported seeing debris from the pipeline floating miles downstream from the site of the explosion. This was the second explosion to rock the Trans Forcados pipeline within the span of 8 days.
