= Vigilante Group of Nigeria =

Civil defense organization

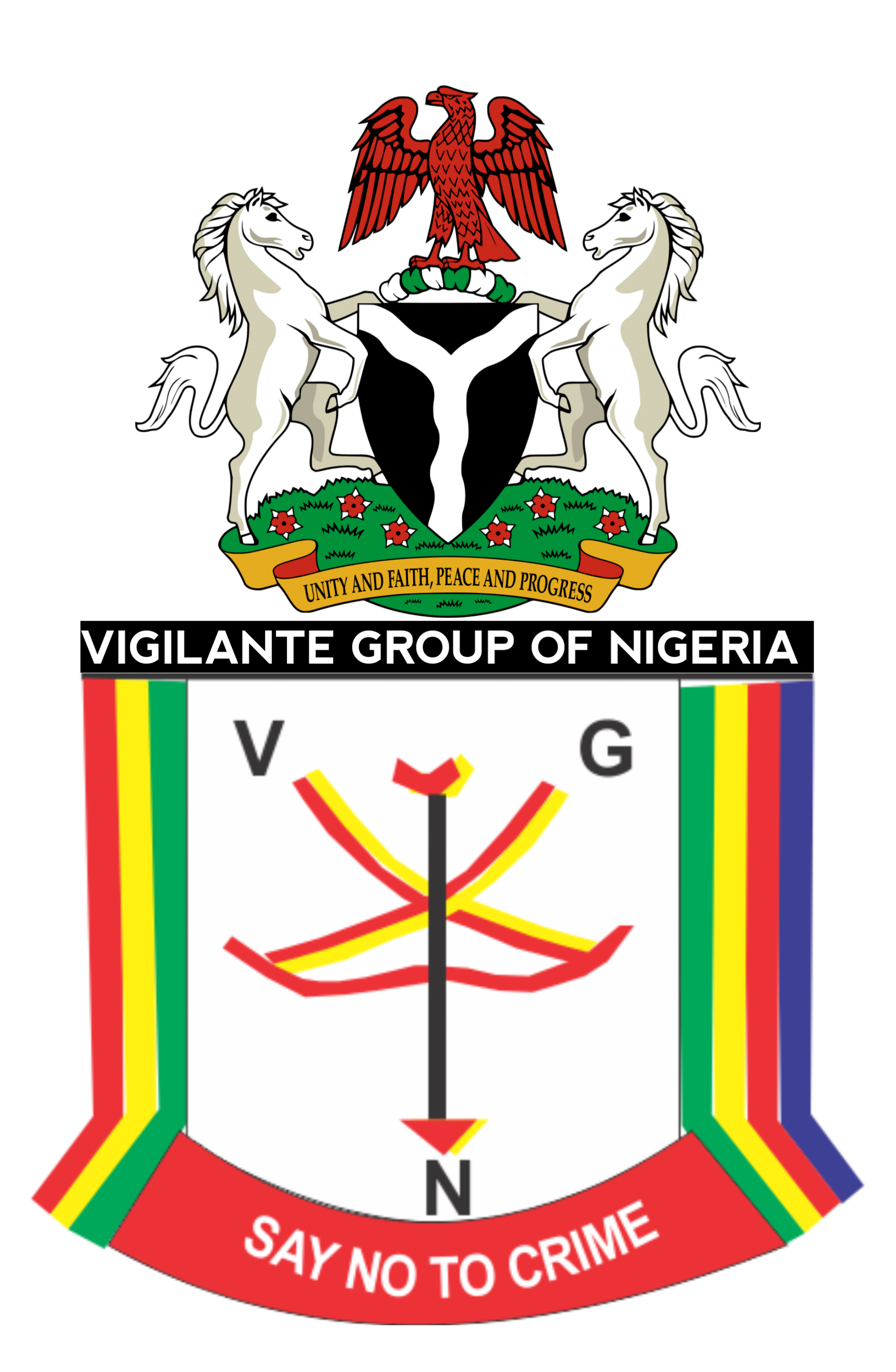
Logo of the Vigilante Group of Nigeria

The Vigilante Group of Nigeria (VGN), established in 1970 and officially registered as an NGO in 1999 with Captain Abubakar Bakori Umar serving as the commandant general of Vigilante Group of Nigeria serves as a civil defense organization collaborating with the police to combat crime and maintain law and order. With members nationwide and its headquarters in Abuja, VGN works in partnership with the police, military, and other security agencies for community policing, intelligence gathering, and contributing to counterinsurgency efforts against groups like Boko Haram. However, VGN encounters challenges such as funding, legal recognition, and regulation.
