= Trans Forcados pipeline =

Pipe Line in Nigeria

Trans Forcados pipeline (also referred to as Trans-Forcados pipeline, Trans Forcados oil pipeline) is a major oil pipeline in Nigeria's Niger Delta. The 48-inch, underwater pipeline spans across 87-kilometres and has a capacity of over 200,000 to 240,000 barrels of oil per day. It transports oil, water and associated gas from fields in the western delta to the Forcados oil terminal. It is operated by Shell Petroleum Development Company of Nigeria Limited (SPDC) and belongs to the Nigerian Petroleum Development Company (NPDC), a subsidiary of the Nigerian National Petroleum Corporation (NNPC).

== Incidents ==
In January 2015, Trans Forcados pipeline was vandalised at Oteghele axis in Bayelsa State and caused a crude oil spill in the area.

In February 2016, Trans Forcados was shut down after it was bombed by the Niger Delta Avengers. It was first attack on a Nigerian subsea pipeline. After repairs were carried out, a militant attack affected its loading program in October 2016. In July 2017, BusinessDay reported that the pipeline was being shut down for the third time in one month.

In May 2018, Trans Forcados shut down for repairs of a minor leak. The Management of the Nigerian National Petroleum Corporation disclosed that more than $32 million was spent this year on repairs to the pipeline in 2018.

On May 19, 2019, a fire incident was reported at the crude oil spill site along the Trans Forcados pipeline in Yeye community. The fire raged till May 21, 2019. Operations were resumed on May 24, 2019.
