= NATO global partners =

NATO program

NATO member states NATO global partners Suspended NATO global partners

NATO global partners, or partners across the globe are countries that cooperate with NATO on a regular basis, but are unable to join the alliance due to Article 10 restricting countries eligible to join the alliance to those in Europe.

Global partners are on the same level as countries with an Individual Partnership Action Plan, with regards to working side by side with NATO member states on "a range of common cross-cutting security challenges such as cyber defense, counter-terrorism, non-proliferation and resilience". Many global partners of NATO are also major non-NATO allies of the United States. These countries cooperate closely with the United States Armed Forces and benefit from other military and financial advantages.

== Members ==
- Australia
- Colombia
- Iraq
- Japan
- Mongolia
- New Zealand
- Pakistan
- South Korea

=== Suspended members ===
- Afghanistan: Designated during the rule of the Islamic Republic of Afghanistan, but suspended in 2021 after the western-allied Islamic Republic fell to the Taliban during the 2021 Taliban offensive. Afghanistan is currently governed by an unrecognized Islamic Emirate led by the Taliban.

=== Applicants ===
- Argentina - On April 18, 2024, Argentina officially applied to become a member of the NATO Global Partner Program.

== See also ==
- Foreign relations of NATO
