= List of wars by death toll =

This list of wars by death toll includes some deaths directly or indirectly caused by the deadliest wars in history. These numbers encompass the deaths of military personnel resulting directly from battles or other wartime actions, as well as wartime or war-related civilian deaths, often caused by war-induced epidemics, famines, or genocides. Due to incomplete records, unreliable censuses or contemporary accounts, differing counting methods, the destruction of evidence, and various other factors, the death tolls of wars are often uncertain and highly debated. For this reason, the death tolls in this article typically provide a range of estimates.

Compiling such a list is further complicated by the challenge of defining a war. Not every violent conflict constitutes a war; for instance, mass killings and genocides occurring outside of wartime are excluded, as they are not necessarily wars in themselves. This list broadly defines war as an extended conflict between two or more armed political groups. Consequently, it excludes mass death events, such as human sacrifices, ethnic cleansing operations, and acts of state terrorism or political repression during peacetime or in contexts unrelated to war. (Note: Some examples would include Operation Condor (60,000–80,000 killed), the Cultural Revolution (0.4–8 million killed), the Rubber Terror (demographic decline of 1.5–13 million), the excess mortality in the Soviet Union under Joseph Stalin (6–9 million killed), the Transatlantic slave trade, the Arab slave trade, the Slavery in the Ottoman Empire, the Human sacrifice in pre-Columbian cultures (2,000-20,000 killed yearly in the Aztec Empire alone), the Dzungar genocide (420,000–480,000 killed), the Circassian genocide, the Partition of India, or the Herero and Nama genocide (34,000–110,000 killed). For further information, see List of genocides and List of ethnic cleansing campaigns.)

Averaging the death ranges, the total for the wars listed is about 570 million, of them 58 million for 500 BCE – CE 500, 117 million for AD 500 – 1700, and 396 million for 1700 – 2023.

== List ==
War	Death range	Date	Combatants	Location	% of global population (rough estimates)
World War II	70–85 million	1939–1945	Allied Powers vs. Axis Powers	Global	3.04–3.69%
Taiping Rebellion	20–70 million	1850–1864	Qing dynasty vs. Taiping Heavenly Kingdom	China	1.42–2.65%
Mongol conquests	20–60 million	1206–1368	Mongol Empire vs. various states in Eurasia	Eurasia	5.55–13.54%
Three Kingdoms	34 million	184–280	Multiple sides but predominantly Cao Wei vs Shu Han vs Eastern Wu	China	13.28–17.89%
Transition from Ming to Qing	25 million	1618–1683	Various, but mainly the Later Jin and Qing dynasties vs. Ming dynasty	China	4.16–5.31%
World War I	15–22 million	1914–1918	Allied Powers vs. Central Powers	Global	0.85–1.25%
Timurid conquests and invasions	7–17 million	1369–1405	Timurid Empire vs. various states in Asia	Central Asia, West Asia, and South Asia	1.94–5.55%
An Lushan rebellion	13 million	754–763	Tang dynasty and Uyghur Khaganate vs. Yan	China	6.04%
Russian Civil War	7–10 million	1917–1922	Multiple sides: Bolsheviks, anti-Bolshevik left, White Movement, Allied and Central Intervention, as well as various separatists	Russia	0.37–0.53%
Chinese Civil War	4–9 million	1927–1949 (Note: Before 1927, violence erupted during the 1911 Revolution, which brought an end to the Qing dynasty and led to the establishment of the Republic of China. Although major fighting had ceased by 1949, the Chinese Civil War is technically still ongoing, with the de facto independent Republic of China in Taiwan still claiming to be the legitimate government of all of China. Meanwhile, the People's Republic of China attempted to annex Taiwan several times during the Taiwan Strait Crises. Large-scale human-caused deaths persisted during the White Terror (Taiwan) and under the People's Republic of China, which initiated the Campaign to Suppress Counterrevolutionaries (1950–1953). This campaign resulted in the execution of an estimated 712,000 to 2,000,000 people.)	Multiple sides, but predominantly Communists vs. Kuomintang	China	0.19–0.43%
Thirty Years' War	4.5–8 million	1618–1648	Anti-Imperial Alliance vs. Imperial Alliance	Europe	0.77–1.38%
Crusades	1–9 million	1095–1291	Originally Byzantine Empire vs. Seljuk Empire, but evolved into Christians vs. Muslims	Europe and the Middle East	0.31–2.8%
Reconquista	7 million	718–1492	Christian peninsular kingdoms vs. Islamic peninsular kingdoms	Iberian Peninsula	1.94%
French Revolutionary and Napoleonic Wars	4–7 million	1792–1815	French Republic, later French Empire, vs. Coalition forces	Europe	0.49–0.86%
Menelik II's conquests	5–6 million	1878–1904	Ethiopian Empire vs. Emirate of Harar, Kingdom of Kaffa, Kingdom of Wolaita, and allies	Horn of Africa	0.39%
Mahdist War	4-6 million	1881-1899	Mahdist Sudan vs. United Kingdom and allies	Sudan	0.29-0.43%
Second Congo War	3–5.4 million	1998–2003	Multiple sides	Democratic Republic of the Congo	0.05–0.09%
Deccan wars	4.6–5 million	1680–1707	Mughal Empire vs. Maratha Confederacy	South Asia	0.75–0.82%
Northern Wars	3.57–4.57 million	1554–1721	Multiple sides	Eastern and Northern Europe	0.46–1.02%
Vietnam War	1.3–4.2 million	1955–1975	North Vietnam and allies vs. South Vietnam and allies	Indochina	0.027–0.153%
Nigerian Civil War	3.04–4.1 million	1967–1970	Nigeria vs. Biafra	Nigeria	0.09-0.12%
French Wars of Religion	2–4 million	1562–1598	French catholics vs Huguenots	France	0.40–0.89%
Korean War	2.5–3.5 million	1950–1953	North Korea and allies vs. South Korea and allies	Korean Peninsula	0.1-0.14%
Hundred Years' War	2.3–3.5 million	1337–1453	House of Valois vs. House of Plantagenet	Western Europe	0.51–1.00%
Soviet–Afghan War	1–3 million	1979–1989	Soviet Union and Democratic Republic of Afghanistan vs. Afghan mujahideen	Afghanistan	
Delhi Conquest of North India	0.5–3 million	1300–1310	Delhi Sultanate vs. North Indian States	South Asia	0.14–0.86%
Bangladesh Liberation War	0.3-3 million	1971	India and Provisional Government of Bangladesh vs. Pakistan	South Asia	
Mexican Revolution	1–2.7 million	1910–1920	Anti-government forces vs. Pro-government forces	Mexico	
Fang La Rebellion	2 million	1120–1122	Song dynasty vs. Fang La rebels	China	0.56–0.63%
Ethiopian Civil War and Eritrean War of Independence	1.75–2 million	1961–1991 (Note: In the midst of these conflicts, the Ogaden War between Ethiopia and Somalia occurred in the Horn of Africa, resulting in the deaths of approximately 37,000 people. This war was a phase of the broader Ethiopian–Somali conflict.)	EPRDF, later EPLF, vs. Derg and People's Democratic Republic of Ethiopia	Horn of Africa	
Russo-Circassian War and Caucasian War	1.5–2 million	1763–1864	Circassian Confederation, Principality of Abkhazia, and Caucasian Imamate vs. Russian Empire	Caucasus	
Second Sudanese Civil War	1–2 million	1983–2005	Sudan vs. SSPDF	Sudan	
Tây Sơn wars	1–2 million	1771–1802	Tây Sơn dynasty vs. Nguyễn lords, Kingdom of Cambodia, Rattanakosin Kingdom, and Kingdom of France	Indochina	
Akbar's Conquest of North India	1–2 million	1556–1605	Mughal Empire vs. North Indian States	South Asia	
Indian Rebellion of 1857	0.8–2 million	1857–1858	United Kingdom and allies vs. Indian rebels and allies	South Asia	
Balkan Wars	0.75–1.77 million	1912–1913	Ottoman Empire vs. Bulgaria, Serbia, Greece, and Montenegro; later Bulgaria vs. Serbia, Greece, Montenegro, and Romania	Balkans	
Algerian War	0.4–1.6 million	1954–1962	France vs. Separatists National Liberation Front, Algerian National Movement, and Algerian Communist Party	North Africa	
Seven Years' War	1–1.5 million	1756–1763	Great Britain, Hanover, Prussia, Portugal, and allies vs. France, Habsburg empire, Saxony, Spain, and allies	Global	
Warring States period and Qin's wars of unification	0.65–1.5 million (Bai Qi alone, figure is significantly higher; Huan Yi, Wang Ben, and Li Mu each produced 100,000+ deaths on top of the 1.5 million attributed to Bai Qi)	475 BCE–221 BCE	Multiple sides	China	0.35–1.30%
French conquest of Algeria	0.98–1.48 million	1830–1903	France vs. Regency of Algiers, Emirate of Abdelkader, Kingdom of Beni Abbas, and allies	North Africa	
Gallic Wars	0.7–1.47 million	58 BCE–50 BCE	Roman Republic vs. Gauls and allies	Gaul	0.37–1.28%
Jewish–Roman wars	0.35–1.4 million	66–135	Roman Empire vs. Judean provisional government	Fertile Crescent	0.17–0.74%
War of the Spanish Succession	0.4–1.25 million	1701–1714	Habsburg Spain, Great Britain, Holy Roman Empire, and allies vs. Bourboun Spain, Kingdom of France, and allies	Global	
Wars of Alexander the Great	1 million	336–323 BCE	Macedonian Empire vs. Achaemenid Empire and allies	West Asia and Central Asia	
Japanese invasions of Korea	1 million	1592–1598	Joseon and Ming dynasty vs. Japan	Korean Peninsula	
Panthay Rebellion	1 million	1856–1873	Qing dynasty vs. Pingnan Guo	China	
Great Northern War	1 million	1700-1721	Kingdom of Sweden, Polish-Lithuanian Commonwealth vs. Russian Empire, Kingdom of Denmark-Norway and Prussia	Northern, Central and Eastern Europe	
American Civil War	0.6–1 million	1861–1865	United States vs. Confederate States	North America	
Mozambican Civil War	0.5–1 million	1977–1992	People's Republic of Mozambique, later Republic of Mozambique, and allies vs. RENAMO and allies	Mozambique	
First Sudanese Civil War	0.5–1 million	1955–1972	Anglo-Egyptian Sudan, later Democratic Republic of the Sudan, vs. Sudan Defence Force	Sudan	
Somali Civil War	0.35–1 million	1981/1988/1991 (Note: Various start dates have been offered for when the civil war in Somalia began. The Central Bank of Somalia, the United Nations, the US Office of the Secretary of Defense, and Necrometrics all assert that the conflict started in 1991, after the ouster of the Siad Barre administration. Political scientist James Fearon argues that the start of the conflict could be dated to 1981, when armed Isaaq clan militias began to launch small-scale attacks against the Barre regime and its Isaaq members, to the razing of the Isaaq majority town of Hargeisa in 1988 by state forces, or to 1991, following the collapse of the Barre administration and the commencement of interclan warfare. For analytical purposes, he settles on 1991 for the start date of a new civil war, because the fighting had begun previously, but a major party to the conflict was defeated. Robinson writes that the "civil war had effectively begun by 1987", referring to Compagnon.)–present	Multiple sides	Horn of Africa	
Burmese–Siamese wars	0.26–0.9 million	1547–1855	Thailand vs. Myanmar	Southeast Asia	
First Indochina War	0.4–0.84 million	1946–1954	Viet Minh, Pathet Lao, and Khmer Issarak vs. French Union	Indochina	
Angolan Civil War	0.8 million	1975–2002	People's Republic of Angola, later Republic of Angola, and allies vs. Democratic People's Republic of Angola and allies	Angola	
Burundian Civil War	0.55–0.8 million	1993–2005	Burundi vs. Ethnic Hutu vs. Tutsi Militants	Rwanda and Burundi	
Second Punic War	0.77 million	218–201 BCE	Roman Republic vs. Ancient Carthage	Southern Europe, the Mediterranean Sea, and North Africa	
War of the Austrian Succession	0.75 million	1740–1748	France, Prussia, Spain, and allies vs. Habsburg monarchy, Great Britain, Dutch Republic, and allies	Europe, the Americas, and South Asia	
Third Punic War	0.75 million	149–146 BCE	Roman Republic vs. Ancient Carthage	North Africa	
Russo-Ukrainian war	0.6–0.75 million (Note: Sources:)	2014–present	Union of People's Republics, later Russia and North Korea vs. Ukraine	Eastern Europe and the Black Sea	
Iran–Iraq War	0.45–0.7 million	1980–1988	Islamic Republic of Iran vs. Iraqi Republic	Iran and Iraq	
Nine Years' War	0.68 million	1688–1697	Kingdom of France vs. Grand Alliance	Europe	
Crimean War	0.61–0.67 million	1853–1856	Russian Empire vs. Ottoman Empire, France, and United Kingdom	Crimea, Black Sea, Caucasus, and the Balkans	
Syrian civil war	0.58–0.61 million	2011–2024	Multiple sides	Levant	
Mexican War of Independence	0.6 million	1810–1821	Mexican patriots vs. Spanish Empire	North and Central America	
Bahmani–Vijayanagar Wars	0.6 million	1362–1443	Vijayanagara Empire and Musunuri Nayakas vs. Bahmani Sultanate	South Asia	
Turkish War of Independence	0.4–0.6 million	1919–1923	Turkey vs. Greece, France, United Kingdom, and Armenia	Anatolia	
Tigray War	0.16–0.6 million	2020–2022	Ethiopia and Eritrea vs. Tigray People's Liberation Front and allies	Horn of Africa	
Roman–Germanic wars	0.54 million	113 BCE – 774	Roman Republic, later Roman Empire and Byzantine Empire, vs. Germanic tribes	Germania	
First Punic War	0.4–0.54 million	264–241 BCE	Roman Republic vs. Ancient Carthage	Southern Europe, the Mediterranean Sea, and North Africa	
Paraguayan War	0.15–0.5 million	1864–1870	Empire of Brazil, Argentina, and Uruguay vs. Paraguay	South America	
Uganda–Tanzania War and Ugandan Bush War	0.1–0.5 million	1978–1986	Uganda vs. Tanzania, National Liberation Front, and National Resistance Movement	Uganda and Tanzania	
Papua conflict	0.1–0.5 million	1962–present	Indonesia vs. Free Papua Movement	New Guinea	
Eighty Years' War	0.1–0.5 million	1566–1648	Spanish Empire vs. Separatist Dutch Republic	Low Countries	
Spanish Civil War	0.35–0.47 million	1936–1939 (Note: While the civil war ended in 1939, mass killings would continue until 1947, during the White Terror period, which led to the extermination of 160,000-400,000 liberals, socialists of different stripes, Protestants, intellectuals, homosexuals, Freemasons, Jews, and Basque, Catalan, Andalusian, and Galician nationalists.)	Nationalists vs. Republicans	Iberian Peninsula	
Colombian conflict	0.45 million	1964–present	Colombia vs. Colombian and Mexican drug cartels, FARC, ELN, and other paramilitary groups	South America	
Franco-Prussian War	0.43 million	1870–1871	Second French Empire, later Third French Republic vs. North German Confederation	Central Europe	
Polish–Ottoman Wars	0.43 million	1485–1699	Polish–Lithuanian Commonwealth, Holy League, and allies vs. Ottoman Empire and allies	Central Europe and Balkans	
Roman–Greek wars	0.42 million	280 BCE–30 BCE	Roman Republic vs. Greek states, later Greek rebels, and Ptolemaic Kingdom	Peloponnese Peninsula, Balkans, Anatolia, Egypt, and Italian Peninsula	
Maratha invasions of Bengal	0.4 million	1741–1751	Maratha Confederacy vs. Bengal Nawab	South Asia	
Colombian War of Independence	0.4 million	1810–1825	Colombian (New Granadan and Venezuelan) patriots vs. Spanish Empire	South America, Caribbean, Central America, Florida	
Third Indochina War	0.4 million	1975–1991	Democratic Kampuchea, China, and Thailand vs. Vietnam, Laos, and People's Republic of Kampuchea vs. Communist Party of Thailand	Indochina	
War in Darfur	0.4 million	2003–2020	Sudan vs. SRF and SLM/A	Sudan	
Mexican drug war	0.35–0.4 million	2006–present	Mexico vs drug cartels	Mexico	
Song–Đại Việt war	0.25–0.4 million	1075–1077	Song dynasty vs. Đại Việt	Indochina	
Cuban Wars of Independence and Spanish–American War	0.39 million	1868–1898	United States, Cuban Revolutionaries, and Philippine Revolutionaries vs. Spanish Empire	Caribbean and the Philippines	
South Sudanese Civil War	0.38 million	2013–2018	South Sudan vs. SPLM-IO, Nuer White Army, and SSDM	South Sudan	
Yemeni civil war	0.37 million	2014–present	Multiple sides	Yemen	
War in Afghanistan (2001–2021)	0.36 million	2001–2021	Taliban and allies vs. United States-led coalition and the Afghan Government (Note: 2001–2002: Islamic State of Afghanistan; 2002–2004: Transitional Islamic State of Afghanistan; 2004–2021: Islamic Republic of Afghanistan)	Afghanistan	
Boko Haram insurgency	0.35 million	2009–present	Multinational Joint Task Force vs. Boko Haram	Nigeria	
Franco-Dutch War	0.34 million	1672–1678	Kingdom of France vs. Dutch Republic	Western Europe	
Ottoman–Venetian wars	0.34 million	1415–1718	Ottoman Empire vs. Holy League	Mediterranean Sea, Greece, and Cyprus	
Liberian Civil Wars and Sierra Leone Civil War	0.3–0.32 million	1989–2003	Liberian government, Revolutionary United Front vs. National Patriotic Front of Liberia, Liberians United for Reconciliation and Democracy, Movement for Democracy in Liberia, Sierra Leone	West Africa	
Cambodian Civil War	0.27–0.31 million	1967–1975	Khmer Rouge and allies vs. Kingdom of Cambodia, later the Khmer Republic, and allies	Indochina	
Goguryeo–Sui War	0.3 million	598–614	Sui Dynasty vs. Goguryeo	Manchuria and the Korean Peninsula	
Carlist Wars	0.3 million	1833–1876	Carlists vs. Liberals and Republicans	Iberian Peninsula	
Iraqi conflict	0.27–0.3 million	2003–2017	Multiple sides	Levant	
Gulf War	0.17–0.3 million	1990–1991 (Note: A no-fly zone was imposed on Iraq following this conflict, which led to several cruise missile strikes against it between 1991 and 2003, some of them in response to Iraqi actions during the Iraqi Kurdish Civil War (that lasted between 1994 and 1997), and others due to Iraq's failure to comply with United Nations Security Council resolutions regarding Weapons of Mass Destruction.)	Kuwait and the United States-led coalition vs. Iraq	Kuwait and Iraq	
Social War (91–87 BC)	0.1–0.3 million	91–87 BCE	Roman Republic and allies vs. Marsic and Samnite rebels, and allies	Italian Peninsula	
Roman conquest of Britain	0.13–0.29 million	43–84	Roman Empire vs. Celtic Britons	Great Britain	
Philippine–American War	0.21–0.28 million	1899–1913	United States vs. Philippine Republic, later Tagalog Republic, Sultanate of Sulu, and Sultanate of Maguindanao	Philippines	
Kalinga War	0.25 million	262–261 BCE	Maurya Empire vs. Kalinga	South Asia	
First Congo War	0.25 million	1996–1997	Zaire vs. AFDL	Democratic Republic of the Congo	
Cristero War	0.25 million	1926–1929	Mexico vs. Cristeros	Mexico	
Greek War of Independence	0.24 million	1821–1829	Ottoman Empire vs. Separatist First Hellenic Republic	Balkans and Peloponnese Peninsula	
Myanmar conflict	0.23 million	1948–present	National Unity Government of Myanmar vs. State Administration Council	Myanmar	
American Revolutionary War	0.18–0.23 million	1775–1783	American Patriots vs. Great Britain	North America	
Chechen conflict	0.08–0.23 million (Note: Sources:)	1994–2009	Russia vs. Separatist Chechen Republic of Ichkeria	Caucasus	
Indian annexation of Hyderabad	0.2 million	1947–1948	India vs. Hyderabad	South Asia	
La Violencia	0.2 million	1948–1958	Colombian Conservative Party vs. Colombian Liberal Party	South America	
Greco-Persian Wars	0.2 million	499–449 BCE	Greek city-states vs. Achaemenid Empire	Southeast Europe, West Asia, and Northeast Africa	0.13%
Arab–Israeli conflict	0.2 million (Note: Sources:)	1948 (Note: While the starting point of the conflict is usually denoted as the 1948 Arab–Israeli War or the 1947–1948 civil war in Mandatory Palestine, violent strife emerged in the region as soon as 1920 during the Intercommunal conflict in Mandatory Palestine.)–present	Israel vs. Arab League, Iran, Hezbollah, Hamas, and the Houthi movement	Levant	
Guatemalan Civil War	0.14–0.2 million	1960–1996	Government of Guatemala vs. Guatemalan National Revolutionary Unity	Central America	
North Yemen civil war	0.1–0.2 million	1962–1970	Kingdom of Yemen vs. Yemen Arab Republic	Yemen	
Italo-Senussi Wars	0.07–0.2 million	1911–1932	Kingdom of Italy vs. Senusiyya, Ottoman Empire	North Africa	
Portuguese Colonial War	0.14–0.18 million	1961–1974	Estado Novo vs. MPLA, PAIGC, FNLA, among others	Angola, Guinea, and Mozambique	
Thousand Days' War	0.1–0.18 million	1899–1902	Colombian Conservative Party vs. Colombian Liberal Party	South America	
Sri Lankan Civil War	0.08–0.17 million	1983 (Note: Political violence in the country has been recorded as early as 1954.)–2009	Sri Lankan government vs. Separatist Liberation Tigers of Tamil Eelam	Sri Lanka	
Civil conflict in the Philippines	0.16 million	1968–present	Filipino government vs. Bangsamoro Islamic Freedom Fighters, Communist Party of the Philippines, and Abu Sayyaf	Philippines	
Russo-Japanese War	0.12–0.16 million	1904–1905	Empire of Japan vs. Russian Empire	East Asia	
Sudanese civil war (2023–present)	0.15 million	2023–present	Sudan and allies vs. Rapid Support Forces and allies	Sudan	
Algerian Civil War	0.15 million	1992–2002	Multiple sides	North Africa	
Lebanese Civil War	0.12–0.15 million	1975–1990	Multiple sides	Levant	
Rebellion of Túpac Amaru II	0.1–0.15 million	1780–1783	Spanish Empire vs. Aymara and Quechua rebels	South America	
Greek Civil War	0.08–0.15 million	1946–1949	Kingdom of Greece vs. Provisional Democratic Government	Balkans and Peloponnese Peninsula	
Yugoslav Wars	0.13–0.14 million	1991–2001	Separatist forces and NATO vs. Yugoslavia, later Federal Republic of Yugoslavia	Balkans	
Irish Nine Years' War	0.13 million	1593–1603	Kingdom of England vs. Irish rebels	Ireland	
Chaco War	0.08–0.13 million	1932–1935	Paraguay vs. Bolivia	South America	
Kurdish–Turkish conflict	0.12 million	1921–present	Turkey vs. Kurdish Republic of Ararat, later Kurdistan Worker's Party	Middle East	
Federal War	0.1 million	1859–1863	Federal Venezuelan rebels vs. Conservative Venezuelan government	South America	

== Charts and graphs ==
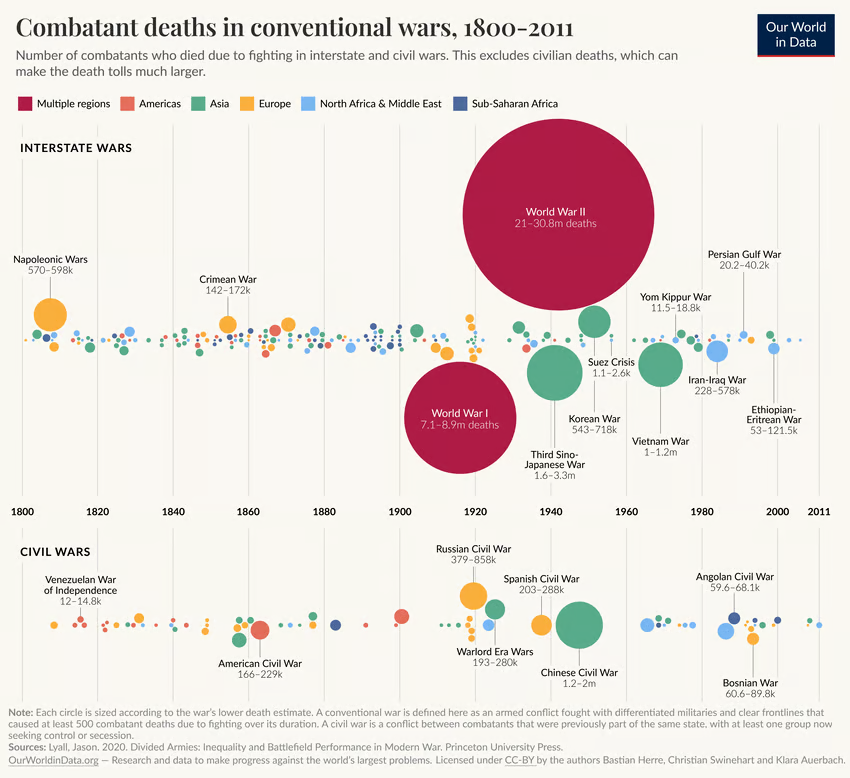
Number of combatants that died due to fighting in interstate and civil wars. This excludes civilian deaths, which can make the death tolls much larger.

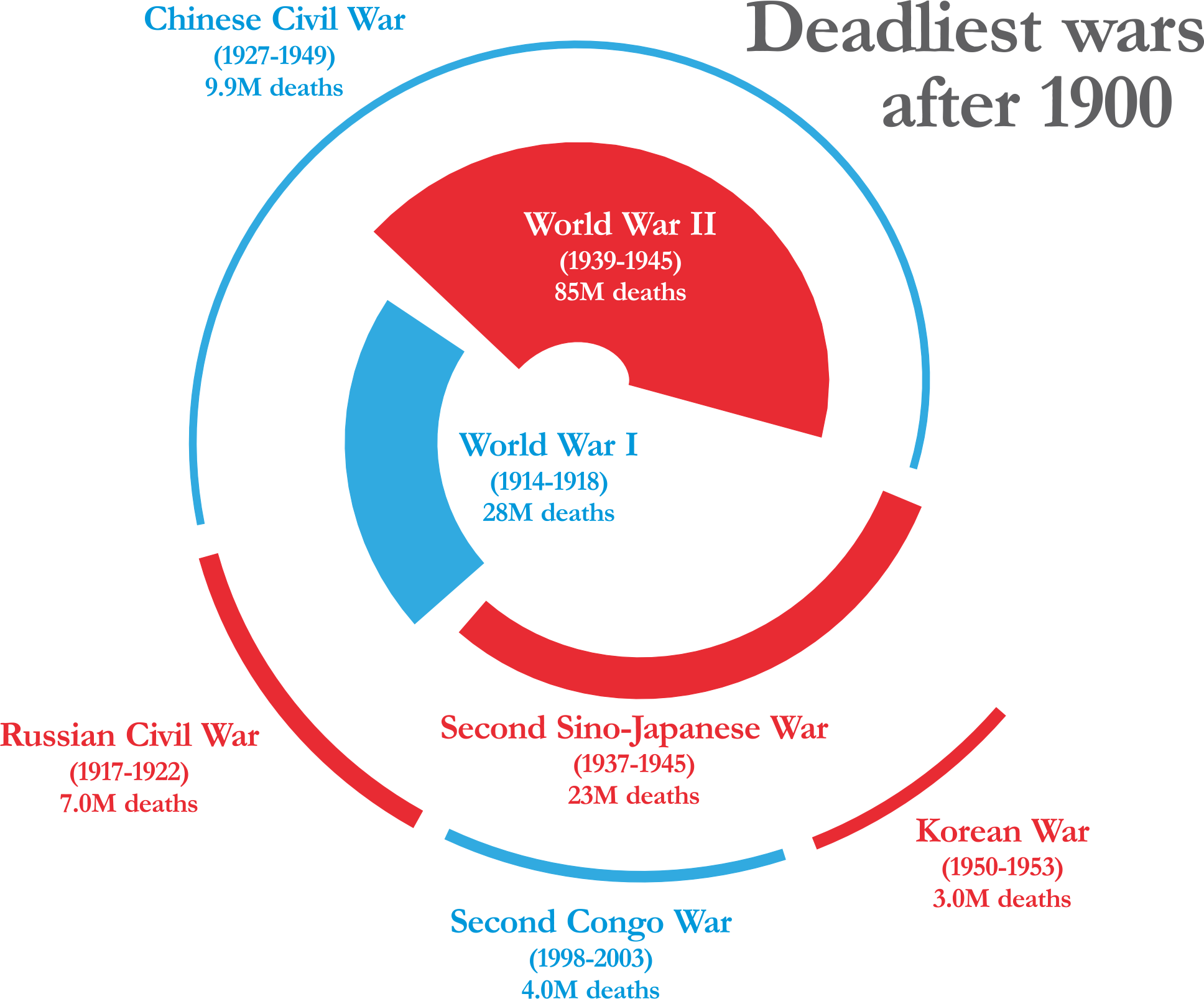
Seven deadliest wars after 1900. The length of each spiral segment is proportional to the war's duration and its area size to its death toll.

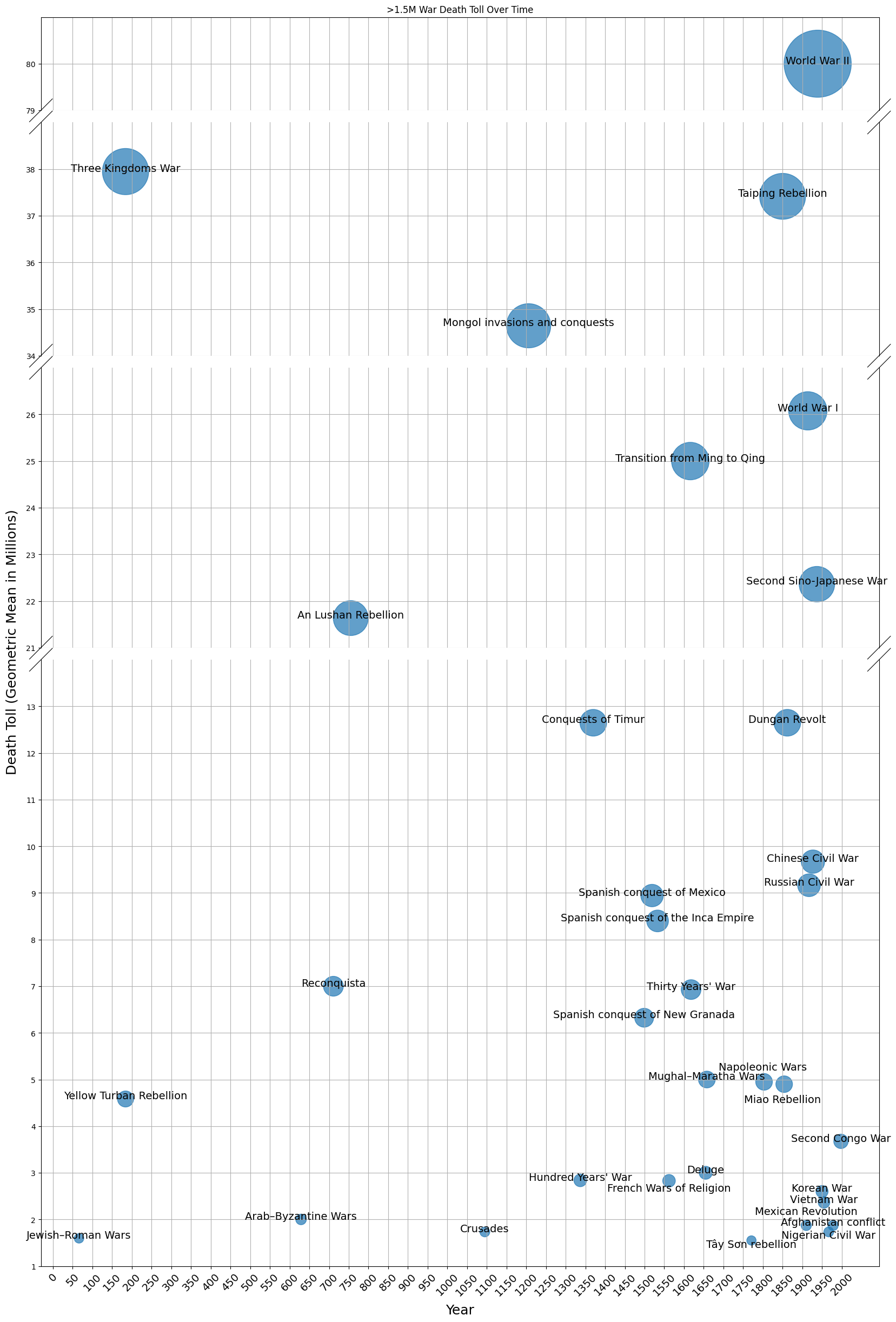
Bubble chart of wars with over 1.5 million deaths.

== See also ==
- Casualty recording
- Timeline of wars
- List of battles by casualties
- List of number of conflicts per year
- Lists of wars
- List of ongoing armed conflicts
- List of genocides
- List of sovereign states by refugee population
- List of ethnic cleansing campaigns
- Genocides in history
- Genocide
- Massacre
- Casualty
- War crime
- Ethnic cleansing
