= Ivorian Civil War =

The Ivorian Civil War may refer one of two civil wars in Ivory Coast:

- The First Ivorian Civil War (2002–2007)
- The Second Ivorian Civil War (2010–2011)
