= Patriotic Convention for Saving the Country =

The Patriotic Convention for Saving the Country (CPSK) also known as the Patriotic Convention for the Salvation of Kodro, was a militia in the Central African Republic.

The organization's native name, Convention Patriotique pour le Salut du Kodro, is a combination of French and Sango words.

The CPSK was founded at a "Constituent Assembly" on June 20-21, 2012. General Mohamed-Moussa Dhaffane is the founder and president of the militia.

The CPSK started making global headlines at the end of 2012 as part of the Séléka CPSK-CPJP-UFDR coalition of militant groups that opened a new chapter in the Central African civil war with a successful joint offensive that rapidly overran a large swath of the CAR.
