= Outline of war =

Overview of and topical guide to war

The following outline is provided as an overview of and topical guide to war:

War – organised and often prolonged armed conflict that is carried out by states or non-state actors – is characterised by extreme violence, social disruption, and economic destruction. War should be understood as an actual, intentional and widespread armed conflict between political communities, and therefore is defined as a form of political violence or intervention. Warfare refers to the common activities and characteristics of types of war, or of wars in general.

== Types of war ==
- Border war
- Cold war
- Colonial war
- Insurgency
  - War of independence
  - War of liberation
  - Civil war
- Fault line war
- Invasion
- Proxy war
- Range war
- Religious war
- Undeclared war
  - Police action
- Total war
- Limited war
- World war

=== Types of warfare ===
- Asymmetric warfare
- Expeditionary warfare
  - Expeditionary maneuver warfare

==== Warfare by objective ====
- Defensive warfare
- Offensive warfare

==== Warfare by strategic doctrine ====
- Attrition warfare
  - Fabian warfare
- Conventional warfare
- Unconventional warfare
- Economic warfare
  - Blockade warfare
- Irregular warfare
  - Guerrilla warfare
    - Petty warfare
    - Urban guerrilla warfare
    - List of guerrilla movements
- Joint warfare
- Maneuver warfare
- Network-centric warfare
- Political warfare
  - Psychological warfare
- Terrorism
  - Anarchist terrorism
  - Nationalist terrorism
  - Communist terrorism
  - Left-wing terrorism
  - Right-wing terrorism
  - Religious terrorism
    - Christian terrorism
    - Islamic terrorism
    - Jewish religious terrorism
  - Special interest terrorism
    - Eco-terrorism
    - Anti-abortion violence
  - Narcoterrorism

==== Warfare by terrain ====
- Ground warfare
  - Urban warfare
  - Desert warfare
  - Jungle warfare
  - Mountain warfare
  - Cold-weather warfare
    - Ski warfare
  - Trench warfare
  - Tunnel warfare
- Naval warfare
  - Amphibious warfare
  - Littoral warfare
  - Underwater warfare
    - Seabed warfare
- Aerial warfare
  - Anti-aircraft warfare

==== Warfare by equipment or weapon type ====
- Aerial warfare
  - Anti-aircraft warfare
- Armoured warfare
  - Anti-tank warfare
- Conventional warfare
- Chemical warfare
- Nuclear warfare
  - Radiological warfare
- Biological warfare
  - Entomological warfare
- Hybrid warfare
- Electronic warfare
- Information warfare
  - Cyberwarfare
- Mine warfare
- Ski warfare
- Naval warfare
  - Submarine warfare
    - Anti-submarine warfare
    - Unrestricted submarine warfare
  - Surface warfare
  - Anti-surface warfare
- Space warfare
- Weather warfare
- Drone warfare

==== Warfare by era ====
- Prehistoric warfare
- Ancient warfare
  - Ancient Greek warfare
  - Aztec warfare
  - Celtic warfare
  - Dacian warfare
  - Endemic warfare
  - Gaelic warfare
  - Gothic and Vandal warfare
  - Illyrian warfare
  - Maya warfare
  - Roman warfare
  - Thracian warfare
- Medieval warfare
  - Anglo-Saxon warfare
- Early modern warfare
  - Renaissance warfare
  - Pike and shot warfare
  - 18th-century warfare
  - 19th-century warfare
  - Napoleonic warfare
- Industrial warfare
- Modern warfare

==== Other ====
- Champion warfare

== History of war ==
=== Warfare by era ===
See: Warfare by era

=== Wars ===
==== Wars by death toll ====
- List of wars by death toll

==== Wars by date ====
- List of wars: before 1000
- List of wars: 1000–1499
- List of wars: 1500–1799
- List of wars: 1800–1899
- List of wars: 1900–1944
- List of wars: 1945–1989
- List of wars: 1990–2002
- List of wars: 2003–2019
- List of wars: 2020–present
- List of ongoing armed conflicts
- List of conflicts by duration

==== Wars by region ====
- List of conflicts in the Americas
- List of conflicts in Australia
- List of conflicts in Europe
- List of conflicts in Asia
- List of conflicts in the Middle East
- List of conflicts in Africa

==== Wars by type of conflict ====
- List of border wars
- List of civil wars
- List of frozen conflicts
- List of guerrilla wars
- List of interstate wars since 1945
- List of invasions
- List of military conflicts spanning multiple wars
- List of proxy wars
- List of religious wars
- List of wars of succession
- List of wars of independence
- List of wars of national liberation
- List of wars extended by diplomatic irregularity
- List of world wars

=== Battles ===
- Lists of battles
  - List of battles by casualties
  - List of orders of battle
- List of sieges

== Military theory ==
- Military theory
- Philosophy of war
- Principles of war
- War cycles

=== Military organization ===
- Command and control (military)
- Doctrine
- Military branch
- Military education and training
- Military engineering
- Military intelligence
- Military logistics
  - Materiel
  - Military supply chain management
- Military rank
- Military technology and equipment
- Staff (military)

==== Operational level of war ====
- Blitzkrieg
- Soviet deep battle
- Maneuver warfare
  - Operational manoeuvre group

===== Military operations =====
- List of military operations
- Military operation plan
- Military operations other than war

====== Types of military operations ======
Types of military operations, by scope:

- Theater – operation over a large, often continental area of operation and represents a strategic national commitment to the conflict such as Operation Barbarossa, with general goals that encompass areas of consideration outside of the military such as the economic and political impacts.
- Campaign – subset of the theatre operation, or a more limited geographic and operational strategic commitment such as Battle of Britain, and need not represent total national commitment to a conflict, or have broader goals outside of the military impacts.
- Battle – subset of a campaign that will have specific military goals and geographic objectives, as well as clearly defined use of forces such as the Battle of Gallipoli, which operationally was a combined arms operation originally known as the "Dardanelles landings" as part of the Dardanelles Campaign, where about 480,000 Allied troops took part.
- Engagement – tactical combat event of contest for specific area or objective by actions of distinct units. For example, the Battle of Kursk, also known from its German designation as Operation Citadel, included many separate engagements, several of which were combined into the Battle of Prokhorovka. The "Battle of Kursk" in addition to describing the initial German offensive operation (or simply an offensive), also included two Soviet counter-offensive operations Operation Kutuzov and Operation Polkovodets Rumyantsev.
- Strike – single attack, upon a specified target. This often forms part of a broader engagement. Strikes have an explicit goal, such as, rendering facilities inoperable (e.g. airports), to assassinating enemy leaders, or to limit supply to enemy troops.

=== Military strategy ===
- Attrition warfare
- Battlespace
- Military deception
- Naval strategy
- Offensive (military)
- Strategic defence
- Strategic goal (military)

==== Grand strategy ====
- Containment
- Economic warfare
- Military science
- Philosophy of war
- Strategic studies
- Total war

==== Military tactics ====
- Air combat manoeuvring
- Battle
- Cavalry tactics
- Charge (warfare)
- Counter-insurgency
- Defensive fighting position
- Guerrilla warfare
- Morale
- Siege
- Tactical objective

== Politics of war ==
- Casus belli – Latin expression meaning the justification for acts of war. In theory, present international law allows only three situations as legal cause to go to war: out of self-defense, defense of an ally under a mutual defense pact, or sanctioned by the UN.
- Declaration of war
- Surrender
  - Capitulation an agreement in time of war for the surrender to a hostile armed force of a particular body of troops, a town or a territory.
  - Strategic surrender – surrender to avoid a last, chaotic round of fighting that would have the characteristics of a rout, allowing the victor to obtain his objective without paying the costs of a last battle.
  - Unconditional surrender – surrender without conditions, except for those provided by international law.
- Victory
  - Debellatio – when a war ends because of the complete destruction of a belligerent state.
  - No quarter – when a victor shows no clemency or mercy and refuses to spare the life of the vanquished when they surrender at discretion. Under the laws of war "... it is especially forbidden ... to declare that no quarter will be given".
  - Pyrrhic victory – victory with such a devastating cost that it carries the implication that another such victory will ultimately lead to defeat.
- War effort
- War economy

=== Philosophy of war ===
Philosophy of war – examines war beyond the typical questions of weaponry and strategy, inquiring into such things as the meaning and etiology of war, the relationship between war and human nature, and the ethics of war.

- Militarism – belief that war is not inherently bad but can be a beneficial aspect of society.
- Realism – its core proposition is a skepticism as to whether moral concepts such as justice can be applied to the conduct of international affairs. Proponents of realism believe that moral concepts should never prescribe, nor circumscribe, a state's behaviour. Instead, a state should place an emphasis on state security and self-interest. One form of realism – descriptive realism – proposes that states cannot act morally, while another form – prescriptive realism – argues that the motivating factor for a state is self-interest. Just wars that violate Just Wars principles effectively constitute a branch of realism.
- Revolution and Civil War – Just War Theory states that a just war must have just authority. To the extent that this is interpreted as a legitimate government, this leaves little room for revolutionary war or civil war, in which an illegitimate entity may declare war for reasons that fit the remaining criteria of Just War Theory. This is less of a problem if the "just authority" is widely interpreted as "the will of the people" or similar. Article 3 of the 1949 Geneva Conventions side-steps this issue by stating that if one of the parties to a civil war is a High Contracting Party (in practice, the state recognised by the international community,) both Parties to the conflict are bound "as a minimum, the following [humanitarian] provisions." Article 4 of the Third Geneva Convention also makes clear that the treatment of prisoners of war is binding on both parties even when captured soldiers have an "allegiance to a government or an authority not recognized by the Detaining Power."
- Consequentialism – moral theory most frequently summarized in the words "the end justifies the means," which tends to support the just war theory (unless the just war causes less beneficial means to become necessary, which further requires worst actions for self-defense with bad consequences).
- Pacifism – belief that war of any kind is morally unacceptable or pragmatically not worth the cost. Pacifists extend humanitarian concern not just to enemy civilians but also to combatants, especially conscripts. For example, Ben Salmon believed all war to be unjust. He was sentenced to death during World War I (later commuted to 25 years hard labor) for desertion and spreading propaganda.
- Right of self-defence – maintains (based on rational self-interest) that the use of retaliatory force is justified against repressive nations that break the zero aggression principle. In addition, if a free country is itself subject to foreign aggression, it is morally imperative for that nation to defend itself and its citizens by whatever means necessary. Thus, any means to achieve a swift and complete victory over the enemy is imperative. This view is prominently held by Objectivists.

=== Laws of war ===
- Laws of war
- War crimes
  - List of war crimes

=== Prisoners of war ===
- Prison camps
  - Concentration camp
  - Internment camp
  - Labor camp
  - Death or extermination camp
  - Prisoner-of-war camp
- Prison escape
  - List of prisoner-of-war escapes
- List of notable prisoners of war
- Prisoner of war mail
  - Postal censorship

=== Effects of war ===
- Casualties
  - Casualty
  - Casualty classifications
    - KIA – Killed In Action
      - DOW – Died Of Wounds
    - MIA – Missing In Action
    - WIA – Wounded in action
  - Assassination
- List of genocides by death toll

== War and culture ==
  - List of war films and TV specials
  - Wars in popular culture
    - Trojan War in popular culture
    - World War I in popular culture
    - World War II in popular culture
    - Korean War in popular culture
    - Soviet war in Afghanistan in popular culture
    - Sri Lankan Civil War in popular culture
  - War as metaphor

== War-related media ==
=== War publications ===
- The Art of War
- On War

=== War films ===
- List of war films and TV specials – lists movies and shows by the war depicted in them, the sections arranged chronologically

== Persons influential in war ==
- List of military writers

=== Inventors of Military Technology ===
- Mozi
- Archimedes
- Wei Boyang
- Kallinikos
- Roger Bacon
- Leonardo da Vinci
- Richard Jordan Gatling
- Mikhail Kalashnikov
- Albert Einstein

=== During the Classical Period ===
Listed by date of approximate lifetime

==== Ancient Egypt ====
- Mentuhotep
- Ramesses II
- Muwatalli I (Hittite)
- Cleopatra (Greek)

==== Ancient Near East ====
- Hammurabi
- Sargon II
- Nebuchadnezzar II
- Cyrus the Great
- Darius I
- Xerxes I

==== Ancient Greece ====
- Themistocles
- Leonidas I
- Dionysius I of Syracuse
- Philip II of Macedon
- Alexander the Great
- Diadochi
- Pyrrhus of Epirus

==== Ancient India ====
- Porus
- Ashoka
- Chandragupta

==== Ancient China and its enemies ====
- Sun Tzu
- Lian Po
- Bai Qi
- Li Mu
- Qin Shi Huang
  - Wang Jin
- Modu Chanyu
- Huo Qubing
- Wei Qing
- Trung Sisters

==== Ancient Rome and its enemies ====
- Mithridates VI of Pontus
- Scipio Africanus
- Hannibal
- Gaius Marius
- Julius Caesar
- Vercingetorix
- Arminius
- Boudica
- Decebalus
- Trajan
- Aurelian

==== Late Antiquity ====
- Constantine
- Flavius Aetius
- Attila
- Clovis I
- Shapur I
- Khosrow I
- Belisarius
- Bahram Chobin
- Shahin and Shahrbaraz
- Heraclius
- Khalid ibn al-Walid

=== During the Post-classical Period ===
==== Early Middle Ages ====
- Charlemagne
- Ivar the Boneless
- Alfred the Great
- Cnut the Great
- Basil the Bulgar Slayer
- William the Conqueror

==== High Middle Ages ====
- Frederick Barbarossa
- Henry II of England
- Richard the Lionheart
- Philip II of France
- Alexander Nevsky
- El Cid

==== Islamic Golden Age ====
- Tariq ibn Ziyad
- Mahmud of Ghazni
- Alp Arslan
- Saladin
- Baibars

==== Medieval India ====
- Rajadhiraja Chola
- Prithviraj Chauhan

==== Medieval China ====
- Li Shimin
- An Lushan
- Zhao Kuangyin
- Yelu Dashi
- Zhu Yuanzhang
- Zheng He

==== Medieval Southeast Asia ====
- Jayavarman II
- Gajah Mada
- Ramathibodi I
- Le Loi

==== Mongol Conquests ====
- Genghis Khan
- Ogedei Khan
- Subutai
- Kublai Khan
- Timur

==== Hundred Years War ====
- Edward III
- Henry V of England
- Charles VII of France
- Joan of Arc

=== During the Early Modern Period ===
==== Japanese Wars ====
- Oda Nobunaga
- Toyotomi Hideyoshi
- Tokugawa Ieyasu

==== Islamic Empires ====
- Mehmed the Conqueror
- Suleiman the Magnificent
- Nader Shah
- Akbar

==== European Colonization of the Americas ====
- Hernán Cortés
- Cuauhtémoc
- Francisco Pizarro
- Powhaten
- Pontiac
- Crazy Horse
- Tecumseh
- Sitting Bull

==== Early Modern Europe ====
- Gustavus Adolphus of Sweden
- Oliver Cromwell
- Peter the Great
- Frederick I of Prussia
- James Wolfe
- Louis-Joseph de Montcalm

==== Chinese Qing dynasty ====
- Wu Sangui
- Kangxi Emperor
- Koxinga
- Ching Shih
- Hong Xiuquan

==== American Revolutionary War ====
- George Washington
- Horatio Gates
- Benedict Arnold
- Marquis de Lafayette
- Charles Cornwallis, 1st Marquess Cornwallis

==== Napoleonic Wars ====
- Horatio Nelson
- Napoleon
- Arthur Wellesley
- Mikhail Kutuzov
- Gebhard Leberecht von Blücher
- Andrew Jackson (War of 1812)

=== Modern Period ===
==== American Civil War ====
- Ulysses S Grant
- Stonewall Jackson
- Robert E Lee
- George McClellan
- William Tecumseh Sherman

==== During World War I ====
- Douglas Haig
- Ferdinand Foch
- Louis F. d'Esperey
- John J. Pershing
- Joseph Joffre
- Paul von Hindenburg
- Erich Ludendorff
- Erich von Falkenhayn
- August von Mackensen

==== During World War II ====
This is divided between political Leaders, field commanders and other influential people

===== Political Leaders =====
- Winston Churchill
- Adolf Hitler
- Benito Mussolini
- Franklin Roosevelt
- Chiang Kai Sheck
- Joseph Stalin
- Hideki Tojo
- Harry S. Truman

===== Commanders =====
- Harold Alexander, 1st Earl Alexander of Tunis
- Omar Bradley
- Zhu De
- Dwight D. Eisenhower
- Charles de Gaulle
- Hermann Göring
- Heinrich Himmler
- Douglas MacArthur
- Ioannis Metaxas
- Bernard Montgomery, 1st Viscount Montgomery of Alamein
- George S. Patton
- Erwin Rommel
- Hajime Sugiyama
- Josip Broz Tito
- Isoroku Yamamoto
- Mao Zedong
- Georgy Zhukov

===== Others =====
- Richard Sorge, Russian spy
- Sofia Vembo

== Glossaries ==
- Glossary of military abbreviations
- Glossary of military modeling and simulation

== See also ==
=== War ===
- Outline of military science and technology
- Campaign history of the Roman military
- Operations research
- Articles of War
- Civilian internee
- Defence minister
- Disarmed Enemy Forces
- Fog of war
- Illegal combatant
- Italian military internees
- List of anti-war songs
- List of war deities
- Military Chaplain
- Rule of Law in Armed Conflicts Project (RULAC)
- The United States Military Code of Conduct
- War among the people
- War and environmental law
- War artist
- War as metaphor
- War bond
- War bonnet
- War bride
- War cabinet
- War canoe
- War chest
- War chief
- War children
- War comics
- War commissar
- War communism
- War correspondent
- War council
- War crime
- War crimes trials
- War cry
- War dance
- War Department
- War dialing
- War diary
- War discography
- War dove
- War economy
- War effort
- War elephant
- War emergency power
- War film
- War finance
- War flag
- War college
- War grave
- War hammer
- War hawk
- War language
- War locomotive
- War memorial
- War memorial locomotive
- War Ministry
- War museum
- War novel
- War paint
- War photography
- War pig
- War pigeon
- War poet
- War profiteering
- War rape
- War referendum
- War reparations
- War reserve stock
- War resister
- War risk insurance
- War rugs
- War sand
- War scythe
- War song
- War studies
- War tax stamp
- War termination
- War tourism
- War trophy
- War wagon
- War zone

=== Wars ===
- Lists of wars in World (by date, region, type of conflict)
  - Lists of wars and conflict by region
    - Lists of battles (Orders)
  - List of terrorist incidents
    - List of active rebel groups
    - List of rebel groups that control territory
    - List of designated terrorist organizations
  - List of number of conflicts per year
    - List of most lethal battles in world history
- Africa :
  - List of conflicts in Africa (Military history of Africa)
    - List of modern conflicts in North Africa (Maghreb)
    - Conflicts in the Horn of Africa (East region)
- Americas :
  - List of conflicts in the Americas
    - List of wars involving the United States
- Asia :
  - List of conflicts in Asia
  - List of conflicts in the Near East
  - List of conflicts in the Middle East
    - List of modern conflicts in the Middle East
- Europe :
  - List of conflicts in Europe
    - Post-Cold War European conflicts
- Australia :
  - List of conflicts in Australia
- Others :
  - List of wars extended by diplomatic irregularity
  - Uppsala Conflict Data Program
  - Failed state
- Ongoing conflicts in World (Commons Maps) :
  - List of ongoing armed conflicts
  - List of wars 2011–present
    - Ongoing military conflicts
    - Maps of ongoing conflicts
