= Soviet–Afghan War in popular culture =

The Soviet–Afghan War had an important impact in popular culture in the West, due to its scope, and the great number of countries involved. The Russian-Ukrainian film The 9th Company, for example, became a blockbuster in the former USSR earning millions of dollars and also representing a new trend in Russia in which some domestic films are "drawing Russian audiences away from Hollywood staples." The use of the war in Russian cinema has attracted scholarly attention as well. Some of this attention focuses on comparisons of the conflict with other modern wars in Vietnam and Iraq. Other work focuses on the war and fictional accounts of it in the context of Soviet military culture. Even when not directly portrayed, service in the war is sometimes used as a backstory for Russian characters to explain their combat prowess, such as in the manga and anime series Black Lagoon.

== Non-fiction books ==
- Charlie Wilson's War: The Extraordinary Story of the Largest Covert Operation in History by Crile, George. Atlantic Monthly Press. 2003. ISBN 0-87113-854-9
- Ghost Wars:The Secret History of the CIA, Afghanistan, and Bin Laden, from the Soviet Invasion to September 10, 2001 by Steve Coll. Penguin (Non-Classics). 2004. ISBN 0-14-303466-9; ISBN 978-0-14-303466-7
- Alexievich, Svetlana (1992). Zinky Boys: Soviet Voices from the Afghanistan War. W. W. Norton & Company. ISBN 978-0-393-33686-3.

== Fiction books ==
- Khaled Hosseini, A Thousand Splendid Suns, Riverhead Book, 2007.ISBN 978-1-59448-950-1
- Mikhail Evstafiev, Two Steps from Heaven, Eksmo, 2006. ISBN 5-699-18424-4
- Gregory David Roberts, Shantaram, St. Martin's Press, 2004. ISBN 0-312-33052-9
- Vladimir Rybakov, The Afghans, Infinity Publishing, 2004. ISBN 0-7414-2296-4
- Khaled Hosseini, The Kite Runner, Riverhead Books, 2003. ISBN 1-57322-245-3
- Tom Clancy, The Cardinal of the Kremlin, G. P. Putman's Sons, 1988
- Ken Follett, Lie Down with Lions, Pan Publishers, 1998
- Vasil Bykov, Afganets, Vagrius, 1998. ISBN 5-9697-0073-8
- Alan Moore/Dave Gibbons, Watchmen, 1986–1987
- Andrzej Sapkowski, Viper, 2009
- Frederick Forsyth, The Afghan, 2006
- Tom Rob Smith, Agent 6, 2011
- Harry Turtledove, "Black Tulip," in Redshift: Extreme Visions of Speculative Fiction, ed. Al Sarrantonio, ROC, 2001.

== Media and popular culture ==
- The Police's 1980 song "Bombs Away" was written in response to the Soviet invasion of Afghanistan, namedropping the latter country in the lyrics.
- Afghan Girl is a portrait of an orphaned refugee during a bombing of Afghanistan by the Soviet Union in 1984.
- Billy Joel's 1989 song "We Didn't Start The Fire" mentions "Russians in Afghanistan" in its lyrics
- "Blood Type" is a protest song by the Soviet rock band Kino concerning the Afghan War.
- "Guns for the Afghan Rebels" is a song by the English Oi! punk band Angelic Upstarts from their 1981 "2,000,000 voices" album, concerning the Soviet-Afghan war.
- Rambo III (1988) was an action movie with Sylvester Stallone set within the Soviet invasion of Afghanistan. It earned over $100 million internationally and originally ended with the statement that "This film is dedicated to the gallant people of Afghanistan."
- Spies Like Us, a comedy about two totally incompetent applicants, Emmett Fitzhume (Chevy Chase) and Austin Millbarge (Dan Aykroyd), are chosen from a CIA recruitment program. They are parachuted into Pakistan and eventually end up in Afghanistan, chased by the Soviets, where they learn they are being used as decoys to draw out the Soviet defenses.
- The song Washington Bullets by The Clash has heavy political content. The last verse of the song comments on both the People's Republic of China's violent mass murder of pacifist Buddhist monks during the Cultural Revolution and the USSR's invasion of Afghanistan.
- The Beast is a movie released in 1988 about the crew of a Soviet T-55 tank and their attempts to escape a hostile region, set during the invasion of Afghanistan in 1981.
- Afghan Breakdown (Afganskiy Izlom), the first in-depth movie about the war, produced jointly by Italy and the Soviet Union, in full cooperation with the Red Army, in 1991.
- The 1987 James Bond movie The Living Daylights, with Timothy Dalton as Bond, was set in Soviet-occupied Afghanistan.
- The 9th Company, the biggest Russian box office success to date. Based upon true events (but largely fictionalized too), it details the 9th Company being left behind as the Soviet Union withdrew from Afghanistan and was slaughtered before the withdrawing Soviets came to the rescue. Some versions available with subtitles.
- The Road to Kabul ("الطريق الى كابول") Arabic television series explored Arab youth participation in the Afghan war.
- Afgan is a documentary by Jeff B. Harmon about the war in Afghanistan shot from the Soviet side.
- Jihad is a documentary by Jeff B. Harmon about the Mujahideen fighting in Kandahar province.
- Afghantsi is a documentary by Peter Kosminsky about Soviet soldiers serving in Afghanistan.
- Charlie Wilson's War, the 2007 movie about the real-life Congressman Charlie Wilson and his relentless efforts to increase CIA support for anti-Soviet Afghan insurgents. Tom Hanks plays the role of Congressman Wilson.
- The Kite Runner a multi-awarded film that showed the escape of a family to Pakistan during the start of the Soviet invasion of Afghanistan.
- The Truth About 9th Company is a first Russian documentary video game dedicated to the Battle for Hill 3234.
- The Swedish metal band Sabaton wrote a song, Hill 3234, depicting the events at the Battle of Hill 3234.
- Peshavarskiy Vals, a 1994 film by Timur Bekmambetov about uprising of Soviet war captives in Badaber training camp occurred on 26 April 1985.
- The 2001 PlayStation game Syphon Filter 3 features several levels that are set in and around Kabul during the war, in 1987.
- In Call of Duty: Modern Warfare 2, the character Nikolai compares the chaos taking place in the campaign mission "The Enemy of My Enemy" to the time he served with the Soviet military in Afghanistan.
- In Japanese manga series Black Lagoon, the fictional Russian mafia group Hotel Moscow is composed of veterans of the Soviet war in Afghanistan, led by former Soviet Airborne Troops Captain nicknamed Balalaika.
- In the book Shantaram by Gregory David Roberts, he describes his experiences fighting with the Mujahideen in Afghanistan.
- Call of Duty: Black Ops 2 features a flashback mission set in the Soviet war in Afghanistan, which saw three CIA-SAD operatives, Alex Mason, Frank Woods and Jason Hudson alongside Chinese intelligence operative Tian Zhao supporting the Mujahideen in a black operations in Khost Province.
- Metal Gear Solid V: The Phantom Pain is largely set in a Soviet occupied region of Northern Kabul, Afghanistan during the war.
- The Soviet–Afghan War is a recurrent theme in the TV series The Americans.
- In the Russian film Cargo 200 the Soviet–Afghan War serves as a story backdrop.
- Leaving Afghanistan is a 2019 Russian war film about the Soviet–Afghan War directed and written by Pavel Lungin.
- The Fortress in Badaber is a TV series about an uprising in a camp in Badaber during the Soviet-Afghan War.
- All Costs Paid is one of the first Soviet feature films to show the Soviet-Afghan War.
- L'étoile du soldat is about a Soviet guitarist that is enlisted in 1984 in the Soviet armed forces to serve in the Soviet-Afghan War.
- The Old Man showcases the main character Dan Chase assisting the Afghani rebels in taking down Soviet Union soldiers during flashback sequences.

== See also ==
- War rugs - decorative rugs woven in Afghanistan depicting war and social topics
