= Syed Javaid A. Kazi =

Pakistani photographer

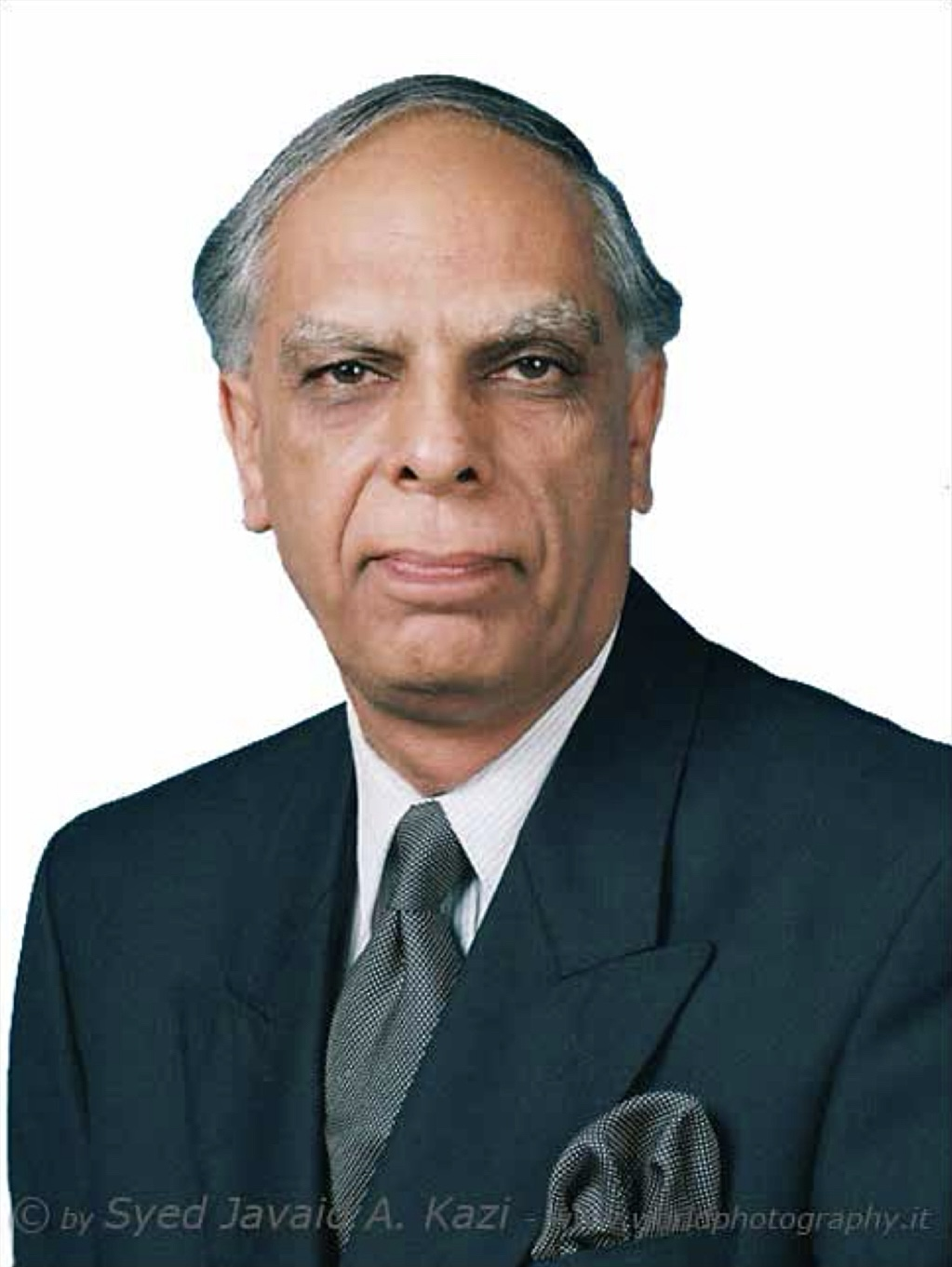
- Born: February 18, 1945; Jalandhar, British India
- Died: March 12, 2025 (aged 80); Islamabad, Pakistan
- Known for: Pioneer of pictorial photography in Pakistan
- Honours: MFIAP, ESFIAP, FRPS, FPSA, MUSPA, Pride of Performance (2006)

Syed Javaid A. Kazi (born Syed Javaid Abbas Kazi; 18 February 1945 – 12 March 2025) was a photographer best known as the only Pakistani recipient of the prestigious Master of the Fédération Internationale de l'Art Photographique (MFIAP) distinction. He served as the President of the Photographic Society of Pakistan and co-authored several books documenting Pakistan's diverse religious and cultural heritage, including Churches of Pakistan, Sikh Heritage of Pakistan, Buddhist Heritage of Pakistan, and Hindu Heritage of Pakistan.

== Early life and education ==
Syed Javaid A. Kazi was born on 18 February 1945 in Jalandhar, British India, and migrated to Rawalpindi, Pakistan with his family in 1948. He came from an educated background; his father, Qazi Syed Abbas Hussain, was a barrister trained at Lincoln's Inn, London. As the eldest of five siblings, Kazi grew up in an intellectually stimulating environment that nurtured both his academic and artistic inclinations. At the age of four, he was gifted a Kodak Brownie by his father, sparking a lifelong passion for photography. He was homeschooled in Murree during his early years, where he began learning darkroom techniques under the mentorship of Asghar Quettawalla, proprietor of Murree Model Photos. He spent his teenage years developing and printing postcards, refining a style characterized by bold, honest compositions.

Kazi became an active member of the Capital Camera Club at Government Gordon College, Rawalpindi and later completed a Master's degree in Physics at the University of Punjab. He also joined the Photographic Society of Pakistan (PSP), founded in 1950.

== Photography career ==
Kazi developed a passion for photography early in his life, with a particular focus on portraiture. He rose to prominence in the 1960s as part of a new wave of Pakistani pictorialists during what is often regarded as the golden era of pictorial photography in the country. Known for his ability to capture human expressions and emotions with depth and sensitivity, Kazi gained widespread recognition for his work. One of his most notable series, "Faces of Mysticism", portrayed the spiritual and mystical traditions of Pakistan through powerful black-and-white portraits. https://www.fiap.net/en/portfolios/mfiap/syed-javaid-abbas-kazi

He later expanded his work to document Pakistan's rich architectural and religious heritage, capturing churches, temples, and other cultural landmarks. His photography reflected the classical traditions of Pakistani pictorialism—soft tonal compositions, aesthetic depictions of rural life, and portraiture tailored to the region's harsh natural light.

In 1985, Kazi was appointed the President of the Photographic Society of Pakistan (PSP) by the society's founder, Habib Ibrahim Rahimtoola. He held this position until his death in 2025, becoming the longest-serving president in the organization's history. In 1998, he co-founded the Islamabad Camera Club to support emerging photographers.

Kazi represented Pakistan at numerous international photography forums and exhibitions. His photographs were exhibited globally and became part of the permanent collections of institutions such as the Photographic Society of America (PSA), the Royal Photographic Society (RPS), and the Fédération Internationale de l'Art Photographique (FIAP). He was frequently invited to serve as a jury member at photography competitions worldwide.

Between 1988 and 1992, Kazi was named among the Top 25 Exhibitors in the World in Monochrome Prints by PSA for five consecutive years and was recognized as a Star Exhibitor. He also received the title of Master of the United States Photographic Alliance (MUSPA) in 2002.

He received several distinctions from FIAP over the years: A.FIAP in 1985, E.FIAP in 1989, ES.FIAP in 1994 (becoming the first Pakistani to do so), and M.FIAP in 2000. He was awarded Associateship (ARPS) of the Royal Photographic Society in 1987 and later elected a Fellow (FRPS) in 2003. In 1989, he became the first Pakistani photographer to be elected Fellow of the Photographic Society of America (FPSA).

He served as the official country representative for Pakistan at PSA, FIAP, and the Federation of Asian Photographic Art (FAPA). Kazi played a key role in helping Pakistan gain federation membership in international photography bodies and also supported the entry of Middle Eastern countries into these platforms.

Kazi's photographs were showcased extensively both in Pakistan and abroad, with solo exhibitions held in countries such as Germany, South Korea, Romania, and Turkey. His work was also displayed at major Pakistani cultural institutions, including the Pakistan National Council of the Arts (PNCA) and Lok Virsa.

"Sacred Companions", one of Kazi's long-term photographic projects, was a visual documentation of dervishes, fakirs, and devotees at Sufi shrines across Pakistan. The project was originally suggested by renowned German scholar of Islam Annemarie Schimmel, and after her death, was completed under the guidance of Jürgen Wasim Frembgen, curator at the Museum Five Continents in Munich. The work aimed to document the mysticism and spiritual devotion found in South Asian Islamic traditions, especially as manifested in shrine culture. Frembgen later praised the collection as "the first thorough documentation of its kind."

A selection of 100 photographs from the project was exhibited at the Museum Five Continents in Munich in 2006, and later shown at the Goethe Art Institute in Karachi in 2007. Twenty images from the series formed the successful submission for Kazi's Fellowship with the RPS (FRPS) and were also part of his portfolio for the Master of Photography (MFIAP) distinction from FIAP. The collection was further exhibited by the Dubai Chapter of the RPS and at the Nuits Photographiques event in Morocco.

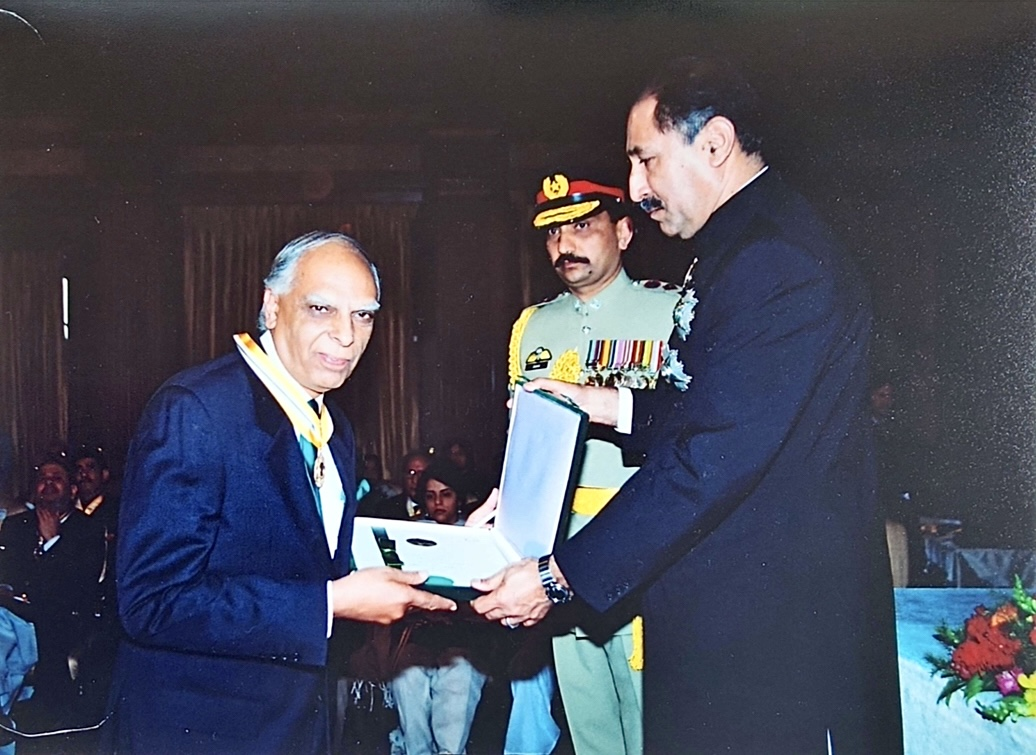
Syed Javaid A. Kazi receiving the President of Pakistan's Pride of Performance award for his contributions to photographic art, 2006.

In recognition of outstanding talent as a photographer and his contributions to promoting art photography in Pakistan and abroad, Kazi was awarded the President of Pakistan's Pride of Performance Medal in 2006.

== Books and Publications ==
Kazi co-authored several notable books focusing on Pakistan's diverse cultural and religious heritage. While he provided the photographic work, the accompanying text in these books was authored by various scholars:

- Churches of Pakistan.
- Sikh Heritage of Pakistan
- Buddhist Heritage of Pakistan
- Hindu Heritage of Pakistan
- Sacred Companions at the Mystical Abodes of Pakistan and India
- Official publications for the National Defence University (Pakistan) in collaboration with the Inter-Services Public Relations (ISPR)

Much of Kazi's published work reflected a lifelong commitment to interfaith harmony. Through his photographic documentation of churches, gurdwaras, Hindu temples, and Buddhist sites, he sought to preserve and celebrate Pakistan's pluralistic heritage. His books became tools for cultural diplomacy, promoting a message of religious coexistence at both national and international levels.

== Death and legacy ==
Syed Javaid A. Kazi died on 12 March 2025 in Islamabad, Pakistan.

Following his death, the President of FIAP, Riccardo Busi, paid tribute to Kazi, stating: "Dr. Kazi was a man of unwavering integrity and professionalism, whose passion for photography and relentless dedication to our Federation left an indelible mark on all of us."

Kazi's legacy is recognized not only through his publications and international exhibitions but also through his mentorship, institutional leadership, and efforts to elevate Pakistani photography on the global stage. He documented Pakistan's cultural life for the Smithsonian Institution and collaborated on interfaith heritage projects promoting cultural understanding. He also championed a photographic identity tailored to Pakistan's distinctive light and landscapes, encouraging local photographers to develop regionally rooted aesthetics.

Kazi's work continues to influence generations of Pakistani photographers and remains widely referenced in publications and exhibitions focused on Pakistan's diverse cultural history.

He held numerous official roles related to photography, including:

- President, Photographic Society of Pakistan
- Liaison Officer for Pakistan, Fédération Internationale de l'Art Photographique (FIAP)
- Director, Federation of Asian Photographic Art (FAPA)
- International Representative for Pakistan, Photographic Society of America
- Member, Advisory Committee on Visual Arts, Pakistan National Council of the Arts
- Member, Advisory Committee on Photography, South Asian Games
- Member, Executive Board, Islamabad Camera Club

He also received honorary fellowships and recognitions from organizations around the world, including Hon. FSIIPC (India), Hon. FPNAS (Sri Lanka), Hon. FICS (USA), Hon. EFMPA, and Hon. FSWAN (USA), among others.
