= Casio AE-1000W =

Digital watch manufactured by Casio

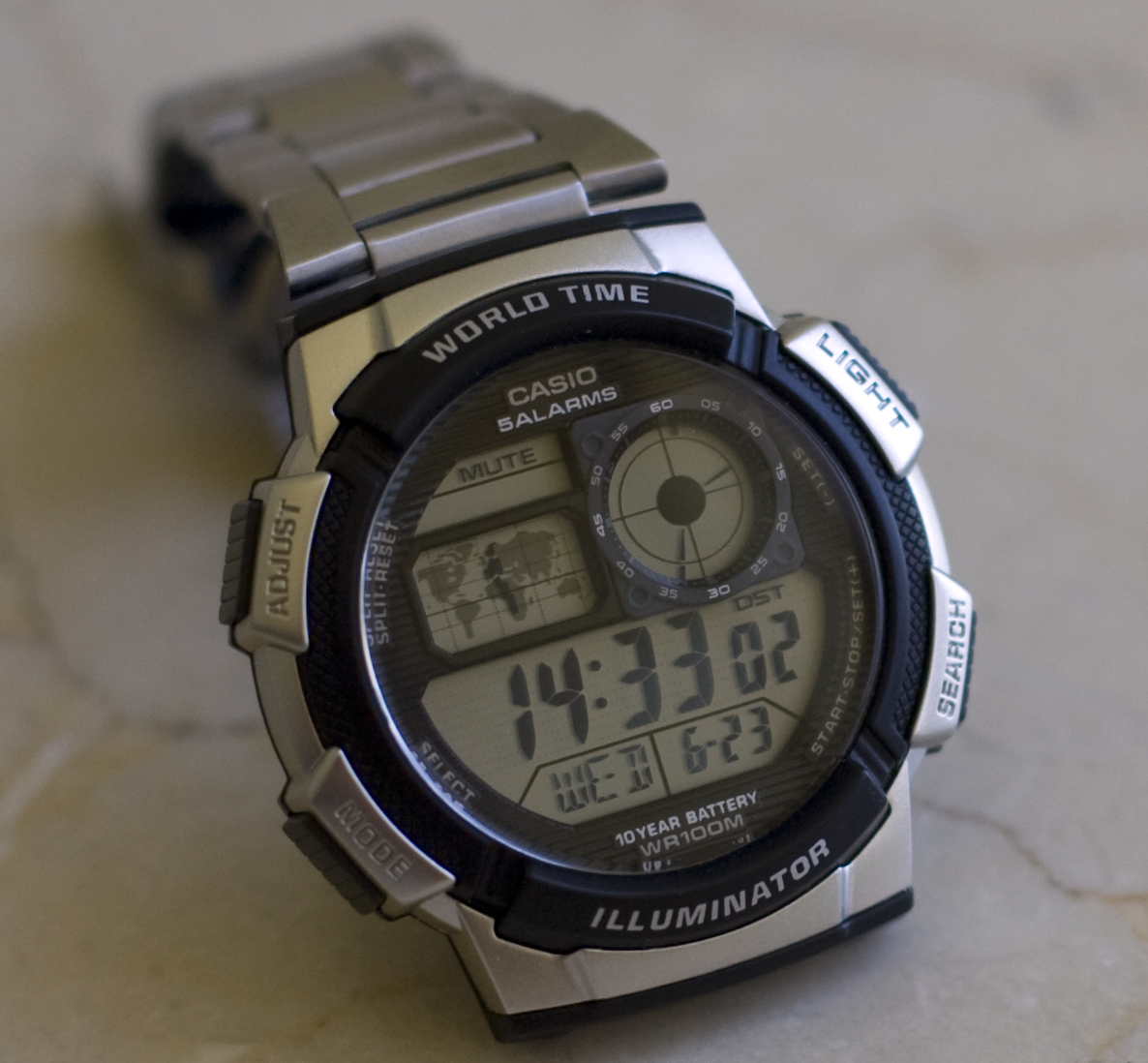
- Casio AE-1000W-1BV watch with a plastic case and stainless-steel bracelet
- Manufacturer: Casio
- Type: Quartz
- Display: Digital
- Introduced: 2010

The Casio AE-1000W is a quartz digital watch manufactured by Casio, a Japanese electronics company. The watch was introduced in 2010 in the "Youth Series" range of watches designed to attract young buyers. The watch is popular for its many features, including world time, and its low price. The AE-1000W has several other variations as part of the AE-series of watches in the Casio Youth Series.

== Specifications ==
The AE-1000W has a 1/100 stopwatch which can count up to 24 hours (23:59'59.99") and has an elapsed time, split time and final time recording. The watch has an hourly chime mode and five daily alarms (also written on the face of the watch) for recurring events along with a one-time alarm which can be switched off using any button. The alarms sound for 10 seconds.

Other functions of the watch include a 1/10 count-down timer mode which can count from a second to up to 24 hours and a world-time mode which displays the coordinated time of 48 cities in 31 time zones around the world. The watch denotes the currently selected time zone by a black segment on the world map display segment on its face (the map shows the home city time zone when in other modes). The selected home city can also be swapped for 4 preselected time zones by the user in the main timekeeping mode by pressing and holding the search button. It also features the ability to set any time zone in the world time function as the home time. The watch also offers daylight saving time which can be switched on or off by using the adjust button.

The analog LCD shows the home time in the same fashion as an analog watch (having an hour, minute and second hand) without any moving parts and is added to display the time regardless of the selected mode. The watch has an automatic calendar up to the year 2099 (with adjustments for leap year) and one amber colored LED light illuminating the display in the dark.

The watch is powered by a CR2025 3 volt lithium button cell which is claimed to last up to 10 years assuming normal operation 10 seconds of alarm usage and 1.5 seconds of backlight usage per day. The watch is reported to be accurate up to ±30 seconds per month by Casio.

The case of the watch measures 48.1 by 43.7 by 13.7 mm (1.9 by 1.7 by 0.5 in) and the watch weighs 40 grams. The watch has plastic construction for its body and lens. The construction of the strap depends upon the variant of the watch but varies between synthetic rubber (called resin by Casio) and stainless steel. The manufacturer's module number stamped on the stainless steel back of the watch is 3198. Interestingly, the watch has the same manual as the AE-1200WH and the AE-2100W because these models have the same functions.

Another function of the watch is the test used to find faults in the segments of the Liquid Crystal Display. The test is activated by pressing the Adjust, Mode and Search buttons at the same time. Pressing the Search button when all the segments are visible during the test displays the watch's module number in the main time portion of the display and the date the watch was introduced in the day and date segment of the display (in MM DD layout). It is useful to spot a counterfeit.

=== Water resistance ===
The AE-1000W is water resistant up to 100 meters (10 bar). The watch is considered safe to use while swimming and showering but is not recommended for use while scuba diving.

== Operation ==
The watch has a digital 248 segment Liquid Crystal Display (LCD) with a world map display on the top left corner and an LC analog display on the top right corner. The analog display is itself made of 48 segments to display the movements of an analog clock. The feature is added to display the current home city time regardless of the mode selected in the watch. The bottom portion of the watch displays the digital time in hours and minutes along with seconds and a small section located at the very bottom of the time segment shows the day and date. The day section is also used to denote the various mode screens selected by the user. Another small portion of the display located above the world map on the top left corner is used to denote the activation of mute (a function to mute the beep sound made by the press of a button), alarm and hourly chime (denoted by SIG) functions.

The face of the watch reads World Time and the top and Illuminator on the bottom of the outer case. The primary functions of the buttons are also mentioned. The secondary functions along with the logo of the company, water resistance range, 5 Alarms, and a 10-year battery emblem is present on the inner casing of the watch located under the plastic lens.

The watch is operated by four buttons (also made from textured plastic) and each button performs the following actions:

- The button on the top left is the Adjust button and is used to adjust the time and date along with taking a measurement in the stopwatch along with resetting the stopwatch and timer.
- The button on the bottom left is the Mode button which is used to cycle between the different menus of the watch and is used to select different portions of the time (hours, minutes, seconds, time zone etc.) when the watch is in the time adjusting mode. The button is also used to mute the beep sound made by the pressing of buttons when it is pressed for three seconds in the main time screen.
- The button on the bottom right is the Search button which is used for cycling between the home time and the 4 preset time zones set by the user in the main time screen. It also plays a major role in cycling through all of the 31 time zones in the world time screen. The button is also used to start and stop the stopwatch along with the timer. The button is also used to set the figures forwards when the watch is in time adjusting mode. The button also activates the daylight saving time (denoted by DST above the seconds in the main time portion of the watch's display) in both the main time and world time screens. It also activates a demo mode in the main time screen when it is pressed for 5 seconds. In demo mode, the watch periodically displays the preselect time zones set by the user. The mode is deactivated by pressing the same button.
- The button on the top right is the Light button which is used to illuminate the display in the dark. It is also used it set the figures backwards when the watch is in time adjusting mode.

== Variants ==
Model name	Description
AE-1000-1AV	Black coloured case with a black resin strap with white lettering on the face and grey coloured display
AE-1000W-1A3V	Gold coloured case with a sand coloured display along with a black resin strap
AE-1000W-2AV	Metallic coloured case along with a dark blue resin strap with yellow lettering on the face and dark blue used on the world map display
AE-1000W-3AV	Military green coloured case with a military green strap with orange lettering on the face
AE-1000W-4AV	Red coloured case with a red resin strap
AE-1000W-1BV	Stainless steel bracelet or a black resin strap along with a metallic coloured case and cyan or black used on the world map display
AE-1000W-4BV	Metallic coloured case with an orange resin strap

=== Similar Variants ===
Model name	Description
AE-1200WH	AE-1000W module (with the world map display on the right and the LC analogue display on the left) in a square shaped resin case, dual LED lights and metal push buttons (available in a stainless steel bracelet variant, resin strap variant and cloth strap variant)
AE-2100W	AE-1000W module in a 200-metre water resistant resin case with a stainless steel bezel and mineral glass lens (available in the same variations as the AE-1000W)
AE-1400WH	AE-1000W Module with a separate front facing light button housed in a resin case and similar water resistance (available in a metallic band variant as well as resin strap variant)
AE-2000W	A variant of the AE-2100W with the world map display omitted for a three-segment design above the main time display and a seconds counter added with animations in different modes

== Other media ==
The AE-1000W is briefly featured in the 2016 American psychological thriller film Mine with the lead actor Armie Hammer (taking the role of sniper Mark Stevens in the movie) wearing the watch. The watch is shown in the scene when Mike is setting the countdown timer to 52 hours, which is the time his Supervisor estimates for his rescue. The 52 hours time was later revealed to be a CGI effect as the watch's countdown timer only counts down from 24 hours.
