= Mindfield =

Mindfield(s) or Mind Field(s) may refer to:

== Music ==
- Mindfield (band), a German thrash metal band
- Mindfields, a 1999 album by Toto
- Mindfields (Morandi album), 2006
- "Mindfield", a 1998 song by Ringo Starr from Vertical Man
- "Mindfields", a 1997 song by The Prodigy from The Fat of the Land

== Film and television ==
- Mind Field, a YouTube Premium series featuring educator Michael Stevens
- Mindfield (film), a 1989 Canadian film directed by Jean-Claude Lord
- Mind Field, a 2009 skateboarding video by Alien Workshop

== Books ==
- Mind Fields, a 1994 book featuring paintings by Jacek Yerka and poems by Harlan Ellison
- Mindfield, a 2010 comic book by J. T. Krul

== See also ==
- Minefield (disambiguation)
