= Secondhand Time: The Last of the Soviets =

2013 book by Svetlana Alexievich

Secondhand Time: the Last of the Soviets
- Author: Svetlana Alexievich
- Translator: Bela Shayevich
- Publisher: Random House
- Publication date: 2013
- English publication date: 2016
- ISBN: 9780399588822

Secondhand Time: The Last of the Soviets (Russian: Время секонд хэнд, romanized: Vremya sekond khend) is a 2013 book by Belarusian Nobel laureate Svetlana Alexievich. An oral history of the Soviet Union and its end, it shares the feelings and views of its people as the country transitioned to capitalism. The book contains few comments from the author herself.

== Themes ==
Secondhand Time reflects on the hopes of the Russian people in the early 1990s during the radical economic reforms and the broken promises of the politicians. It also documents the cultural and political life of its citizens in Soviet Russia as money and commercial restaurants replaced the influence of books and domestic kitchen spaces.

== Reception ==
The Guardian named it the third best book of the 21st century. The New York Times ranked it #72 in its list of the 100 best books of the 21st century. Dwight Garner described it as an "enormous radio" of stories but commented that they sometimes are "baggy and repetitive". Comparing the author to Studs Terkel, Garner praised the observations of Alexievich and the English translation's quality. In The Australian, Mireille Juchau wrote that the work had "magnetic detail" and commented that the subtitle "An Oral History" did not encompass the scale of its contents, citing Ales Adamovich's description of Alexievich as an author of "epic chorus"-style literature.
