= Mine warfare =

Mine warfare refers to the use of different types of explosive devices:

- Land mine, a weight-triggered explosive device intended to maim or kill people or to disable or destroy vehicles
- Minelaying, deployment of explosive mines at sea
  - Naval mine, a self-contained explosive device placed in water to destroy ships or submarines
- Mining (military), the use of tunnels and sometimes large amounts of explosives to bring down fortifications

== See also ==
- Minesweeper (disambiguation)
- Minehunter
- Minelayer
