= Minefield (disambiguation) =

A minefield is an area covered with land mines or naval mines.

Minefield(s) may also refer to:

- "Minefield" (Star Trek: Enterprise), the 29th episode of the television series Star Trek: Enterprise
- Minefield (video game), a 1983 video game
- The Minefield, an Australian radio programme
- "Minefields" (song), 2020 song by Faouzia and John Legend

== See also ==
- Minesweeper (disambiguation)
- Mindfield (disambiguation)
