= Border Battle =

Border Battle or Battle of the Border or similar, may refer to:

== Sports ==
- Kentucky–Tennessee rivalry in sports
- Wisconsin vs Minnesota in sports
  - Minnesota–Wisconsin football rivalry
  - Milwaukee Brewers vs Minnesota Twins in Major League Baseball rivalries
- Battle of the Border (Lamar–McNeese State) of Texas–Louisiana

== Warfare ==
- Battle of the Border (Polish: Bitwa graniczna), a series of battles in the opening days of the Battle of Poland in 1939 during World War II

== Other uses ==
- Battle for the Border, an award-winning news documentary written and produced by news reporter Jeremy Hubbard

== See also ==
- Battle of the Persian Border (551 BC) between Media and Persia
- Border War (disambiguation)
