= 2015 Nobel Prize in Literature =

- Svetlana Alexievich
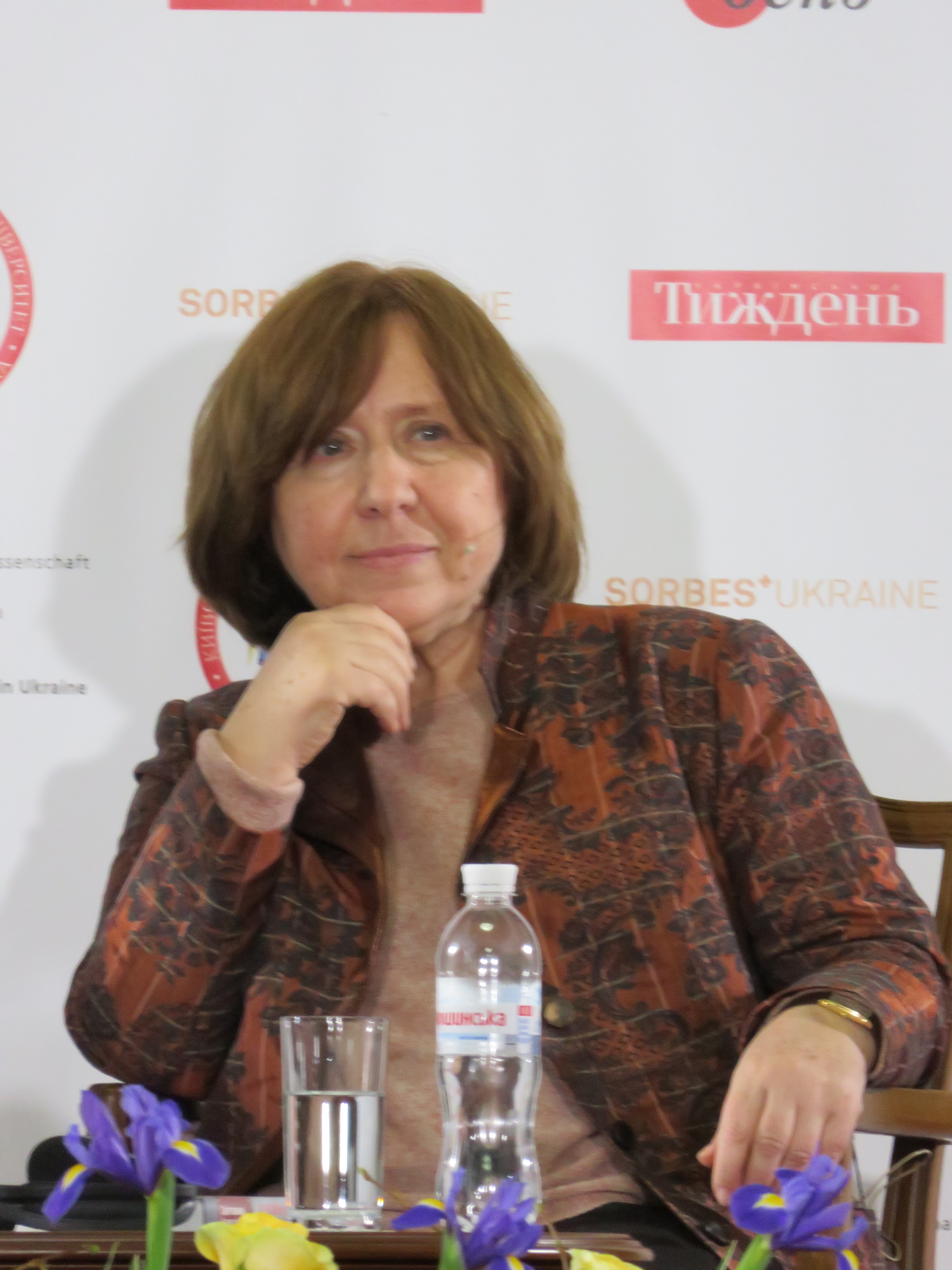
- "for her polyphonic writings, a monument to suffering and courage in our time."
- Date: 8 October 2015 (announcement); 10 December 2015 (ceremony)
- Location: Stockholm, Sweden
- Presented by: Swedish Academy
- First award: 1901
- Website: Official website

The 2015 Nobel Prize in Literature was awarded to the Belarusian journalist Svetlana Alexievich (born 1948) "for her polyphonic writings, a monument to suffering and courage in our time". She is described as the first journalist and the first Belarusian national to receive the Nobel prize which she received on December 10, 2015.

== Laureate ==
Alexievich depicts life during and after the Soviet Union through the experience of individuals. In her books, she uses interviews to create a collage of a wide range of voices. With her "documentary novels", Alexievich, who is a journalist, moves in the boundary between reporting and fiction. Her major works includes the Chernobylskaya molitva ("Voices from Chernobyl: The Oral History of a Nuclear Disaster", 1997) and U voyny ne zhenskoe litso ("The Unwomanly Face of War: An Oral History of Women in World War II", 1985). Her books criticize political regimes in both the Soviet Union and later Belarus as in Vremya sekond khend ("Secondhand Time: The Last of the Soviets", 2013).

== Nominations ==
According to Peter Englund, there were a total of 198 writers nominated with 36 new candidates for the award. On Ladbrokes, Svetlana Alexievich was the favourite to win the prize this year followed by Japanese Haruki Murakami, Kenyan Ngũgĩ wa Thiong'o, Norwegian Jon Fosse (awarded in 2023), and Americans Joyce Carol Oates and Philip Roth. Other writers tipped to win the prize included Egyptian Nawal El Saadawi, Hungarian Peter Nadas, Korean Ko Un, Austrian Peter Handke (awarded in 2019), Irish John Banville, Albanian Ismail Kadare, Somali Nuruddin Farah and Syrian poet Adonis.

In 2016, Alexievich hoped that Murakami wins the Nobel Prize, but was eventually awarded to Bob Dylan. She expressed: "I've read all of Murakami's works. I love this writer, although they say that it is a simplified literature. I like the oriental arrangement of events and their understanding, I am interested in."

== "Documentary Literature" ==
Alexievich herself rejects the notion that she is a journalist, and, in fact, Alexievich's chosen genre is sometimes called "documentary literature": an artistic rendering of real events, with a degree of poetic license. In her own words:

"I've been searching for a literary method that would allow the closest possible approximation to real life. Reality has always attracted me like a magnet, it tortured and hypnotized me, I wanted to capture it on paper. So I immediately appropriated this genre of actual human voices and confessions, witness evidences and documents. This is how I hear and see the world – as a chorus of individual voices and a collage of everyday details. This is how my eye and ear function. In this way all my mental and emotional potential is realized to the full. In this way I can be simultaneously a writer, reporter, sociologist, psychologist and preacher."

== Nobel lecture and award ceremony ==
Alexievich delivered a Nobel lecture on December 7, 2015 entitled On the Battle Lost, which was originally in Russian. In her lecture, she depicted life during and after the Soviet Union through the various experience of individuals based on interviews and creating them into collages of memories.

Sara Danius, in the presentation of the award, said:

"Alexievich uncovers the face of evil in a truth process where 'heat incinerates the lies' and in language that, between the lines, conveys the silence of pain. She waits until the voices lodge in her, acquiring a harder sheen. This makes her the most sensitive of contemporary historians and a genre innovator."

== Gallery ==
- 8 October 2015: Announcement of the 2015 Nobel Prize laureate in Literature in Stockholm by the Permanent Secretary Sara Danius.
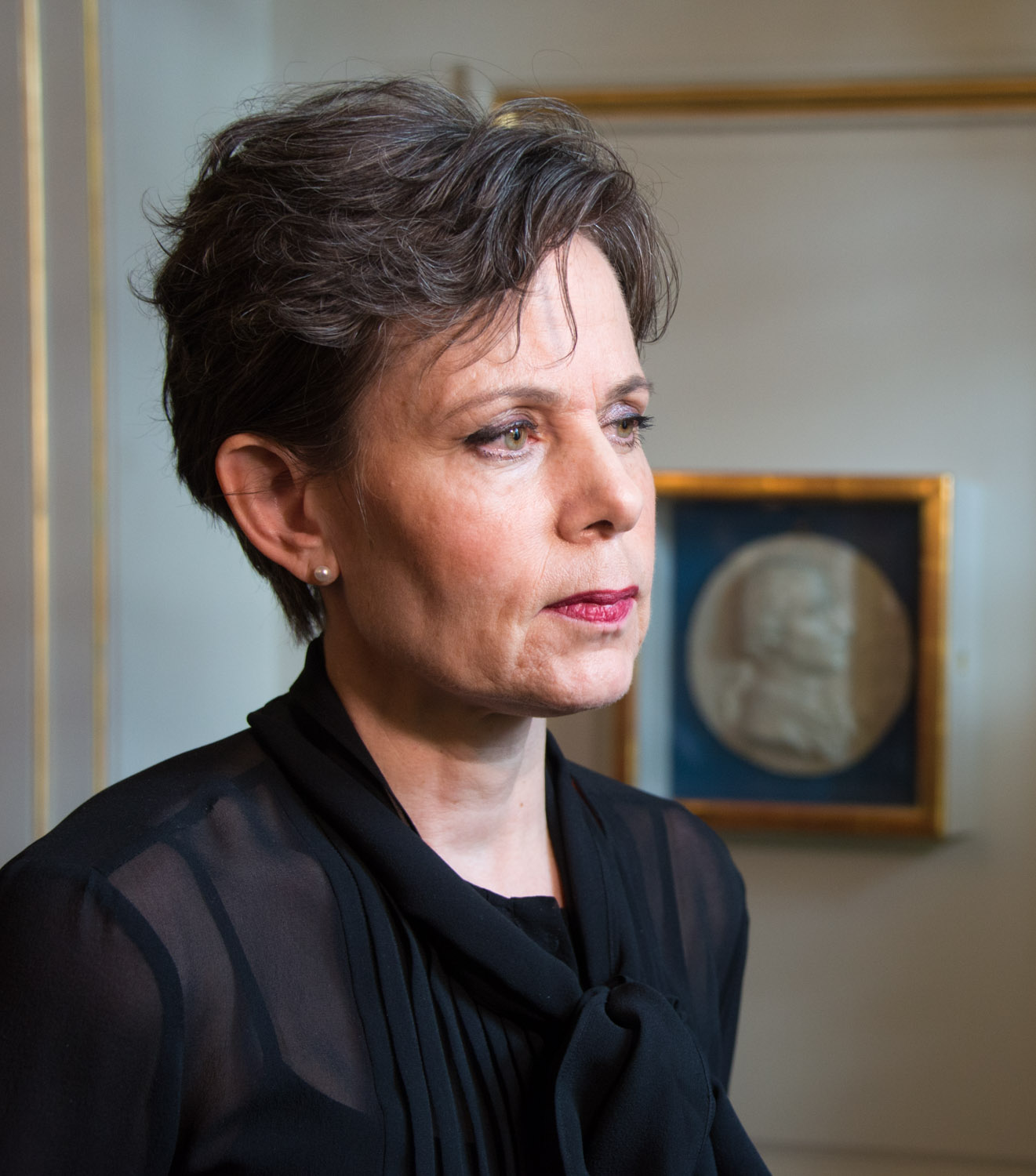

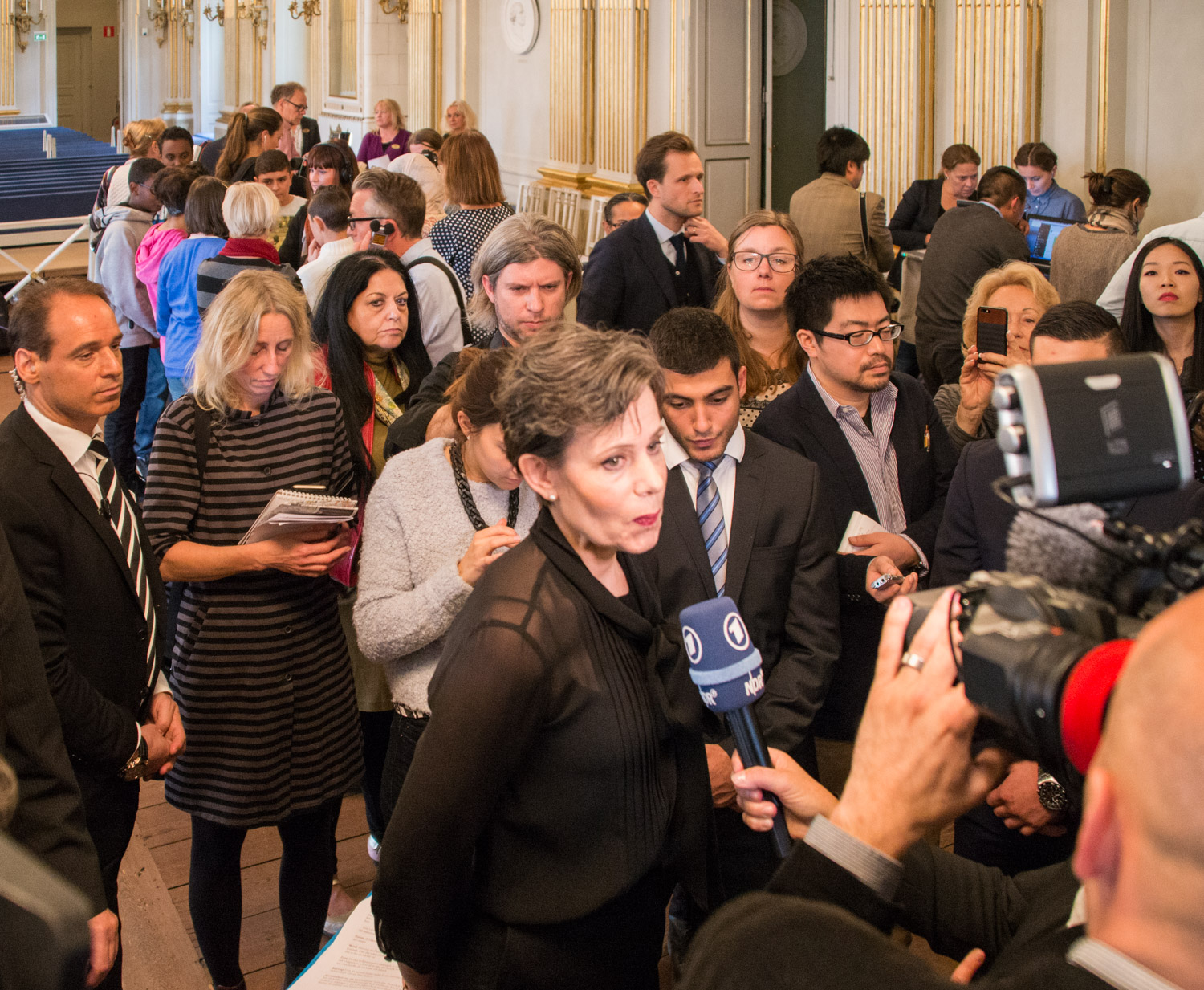

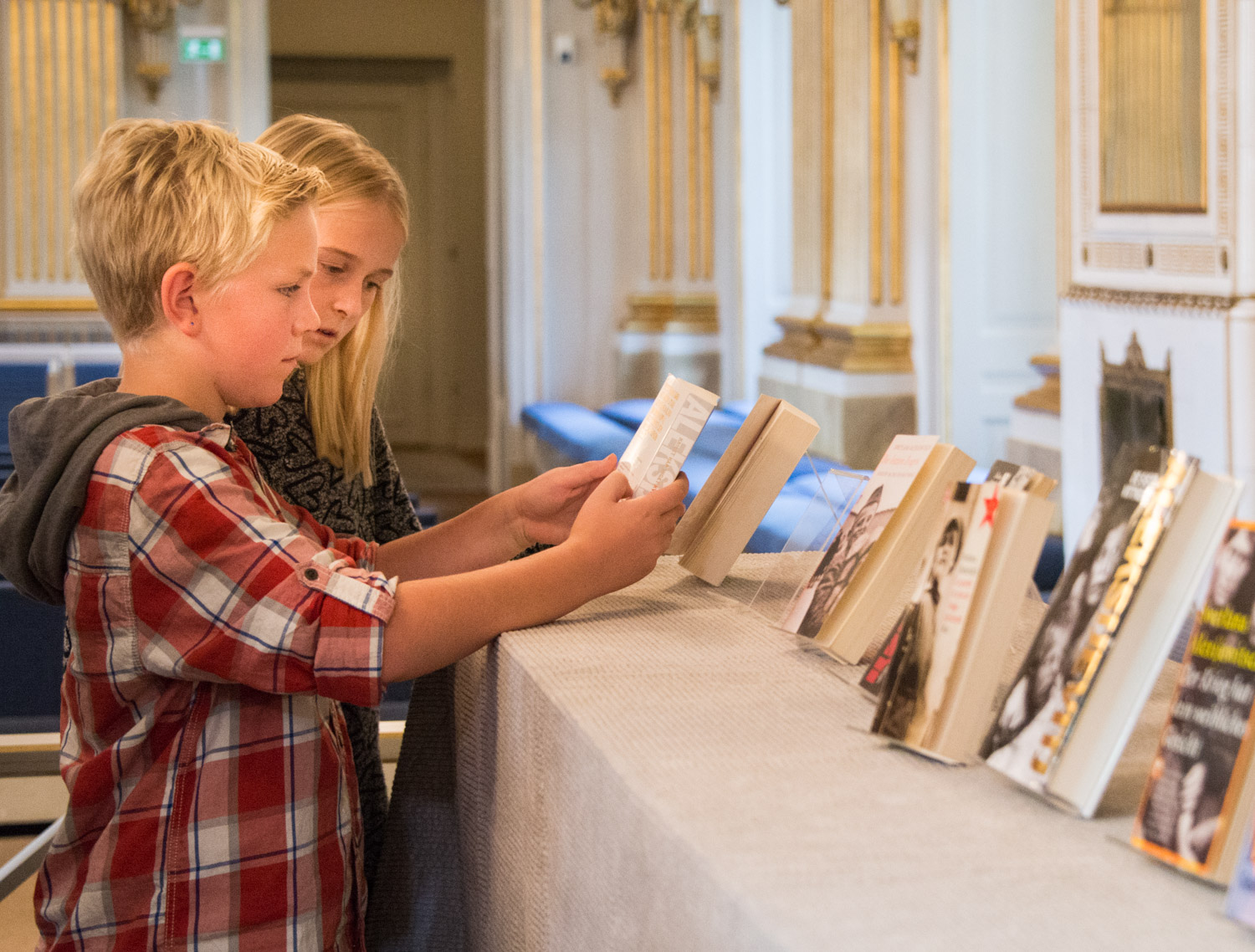
