= Mine (2016 film) =

2016 film by Fabio Guaglione and Fabio Resinaro

- Italian theatrical release poster
- Directed by: Fabio Guaglione; Fabio Resinaro
- Screenplay by: Fabio Guaglione; Fabio Resinaro
- Produced by: Peter Safran; Andrea Cucchi
- Starring: Armie Hammer; Annabelle Wallis; Tom Cullen; Clint Dyer; Geoff Bell; Juliet Aubrey
- Cinematography: Sergi Vilanova
- Edited by: Matteo Santi; Fabio Guaglione; Filippo Mauro Boni
- Music by: Luca Balboni; Andrea Bonini
- Production companies: The Safran Company; Roxbury; Sun Film; Mine Canarias
- Distributed by: Universal Pictures (Worldwide); Eagle Pictures (Italy); Well Go USA Entertainment (United States); Aurum Producciones (Spain)
- Release dates: October 6, 2016 (Italy); December 30, 2016 (Spain); April 7, 2017 (United States)
- Running time: 106 minutes
- Countries: Italy; United States; Spain
- Language: English
- Box office: $1.7 million

Mine is a 2016 psychological thriller war film written and directed by Fabio Guaglione and Fabio Resinaro, in their feature film directorial debuts. It stars Armie Hammer as a United States Marine who is walking on an unmapped minefield during a botched mission when one fateful step makes his heart sink as he hears a click underfoot and tries to remain still until help arrives. The film was released in the United States on April 7, 2017.

== Plot ==
In North Africa, US Marine sniper Mike Stevens and his spotter Tommy Madison are on a secret mission to assassinate a dangerous terrorist leader attending a Bedouin wedding. Mike botches the assassination attempt, hesitating when the target's son steps in the way. Due to a glare off the sniper scope, Mike and Tommy are discovered by the enemy and attacked. However, a sandstorm forces the enemy to retreat, leaving Mike and Tommy behind. Seeking an immediate evacuation, the two are instructed to find their way to a village where they can be picked up once the sandstorm stops.

However, en route to the village, Tommy steps with a click sound on a land mine which blows off his legs. Moments later, Mike steps with a click sound too, but realizes he has done so and avoids stepping off. Tommy, hoping to prevent Mike from giving him medical attention (and thereby injuring himself), kills himself with his pistol.

Now alone, Mike contacts his superior via transmitter, who tells him that he will have to hold out for a few days before he can be rescued. Exposed to the harsh environment of the desert, he battles both the psychological and physical tolls of the treacherous situation he is trapped in, recalling memories or imagining appearances of Tommy, his girlfriend, his parents, and moments from when he was a young boy.

Mike is visited several times by a Berber, who long ago lost one of his legs as well as his only daughter to a land mine he had intended to take and sell to enemy soldiers. The Berber, who speaks some English, urges Mike to step off and move forward with life. He insists that Mike is a lucky man, after surviving a night attack by desert dogs while simultaneously managing to keep his foot still on the same place.

Mike is later attacked by enemy insurgents, who had traced him to his current location, but is able to fight them off. Mike then reluctantly decides to accept the Berber's advice, having grown weary of his predicament. He steps off, only for the underfoot not to explode. He digs and discovers that what he had assumed to be an explosive was actually just a tin can with a little toy soldier inside of it. He sets off a flare and is finally rescued. Back in the United States, he reunites with his girlfriend, to whom he finally proposes.

== Cast ==
- Armie Hammer as Mike Stevens
- Annabelle Wallis as Jenny, Mike's girlfriend
- Tom Cullen as Tommy Madison
- Clint Dyer as the Berber
- Geoff Bell as Mike's father (Bob)
- Juliet Aubrey as Mike's mother (Rosa)
- Inés Píñar Mille as Berber's child
- Luka Peros as Delta Force Soldier
- Daniel Sandoval as Little Mike
- Agustín Rodríguez as Sayid Assif
- Yesarela Azurmendi as Bedouin Bride
- Manuel Medero as Bedouin Groom
- David Traylor as Major (voice)
- Edoardo Purgatori as Com. Operator (voice)

== Production ==
In 2012, Fabio Guaglione and Fabio Resinaro pitched to Peter Safran the scriptment for Mine.

Armie Hammer joined the cast of the film on April 30, 2014. Guaglione was at first against Hammer's casting, because of his previous "charming" roles and once said to producer Peter Safran that "if [Armie Hammer] stars, the movie's dead". However, Safran convinced him by telling him of Hammer's collaborations with famous directors such as David Fincher, Clint Eastwood, and Guy Ritchie, and organizing a meeting with the actor. For the role of US Marine Tommy Madison, Guaglione and Resinaro considered over 50 American actors, including Rami Malek, Adam Brody and Chris Zylka, before choosing British actor Tom Cullen.

The movie was shot in Fuerteventura in the Canary Islands. The directors dedicated the film in memory of their location manager, Nikolai Semjevski (1975–2015).

== Release ==
Mine was released in Italy on 6 October 2016 by Eagle Pictures. It was released on April 7, 2017, in the United States by Well Go USA Entertainment, and in United Kingdom by Universal Pictures.

=== Critical response ===
On review aggregator website Rotten Tomatoes, the film holds an approval rating of 16% based on 30 reviews, and an average rating of 3.99/10. Its critics consensus reads, "Exhausting when it should be thrilling, Mine squanders a committed performance by Armie Hammer with slack suspense and unfocused storytelling." On Metacritic, the film has a weighted average score of 40 out of 100, based on 10 critics, indicating "mixed or average reviews".

In Italy, the film received more positive reviews. According to aggregator Mymovies.it, Mine was rated 3.20 stars out of 5.
