= Zinky Boys =

1989 documentary book by Belarusian writer Svetlana Alexievich

Zinky Boys (Russian: Цинковые мальчики, romanized: Tsinkovye malchiki), also translated as Boys in Zinc is a 1989 documentary book by Belarusian writer Svetlana Alexievich about the Soviet–Afghan War. The title refers to zinc-plated coffins in which the fallen soldiers were transported home to the Soviet Union as "cargo 200". The book collected anonymous memoirs of soldiers and relatives.

The book followed the method she employed in her two previous documentary books on war, War's Unwomanly Face and Last Witnesses. Although the author corrected the language of the interviewees, she avoids any commentary. German literary critic Dietmar Jacobsen writes:

The result is shocking. The reader accompanies people full of enthusiasm and a willingness to sacrifice themselves into a war that brutalizes them to the extreme. Young men who love their parents and grow up with books, pictures and music become killing machines whose idealism is not long enough to cope with the bloody reality. While official propaganda at home cultivates the image of the heroic "internationalist fighter" who helps the Afghan people throw off the yoke of feudalism, builds wells and roads, takes part in the collectivization of agriculture and paves the way for women to have a self-determined future, people on the ground live in constant danger of death, poorly equipped and with inadequate food supplies, drawing strength for the next few hours from drugs and alcohol and often mutilating themselves to escape the horror.

A number of plays and two documentaries were based on the book.

== Reception ==
The book was the subject of controversy, and the author was accused of "defamation" and "desecration of the soldiers' honor". The later releases of the book included excerpts from court proceedings over the Zinky Boys.

Professor Jeff Jones of the UNC Greensboro argues that the representation of women in the book "reflects a changing discourse in Soviet society on the war in Afghanistan that helped pave the way for the collapse of the USSR."

== Translations ==
- (English, US) Zinky Boys: Soviet Voices from the Afghanistan War. W W Norton 1992 (ISBN 0-393-03415-1), translated by Julia and Robin Whitby.
- (English, UK) Boys in Zinc. Penguin Modern Classics 2016 ISBN 9780241264119, translated by Andrew Bromfield.
- (German) Zinkjungen. Afghanistan und die Folgen. Fischer, Frankfurt am Main 1992, ISBN 978-3-10-000816-9.
- (German) New, expanded edition; Hanser Berlin, München 2014, ISBN 978-3-446-24528-0.
- (Hungarian) Fiúk cinkkoporsóban. Európa, 1999. ISBN 963-07662-4-8.
- (Portuguese) Rapazes de Zinco: A geração soviética caída na guerra do Afeganistão. Elsinore, 2017. ISBN 9789898864000.
- (Turkish) Çinko Çocuklar. Kafka Yayınevi, 2018. Translated by Serdar Arıkan & Fatma Arıkan. ISBN 978-605-4820-64-1.
- (Catalan) Els nois de zinc. Raig Verd, 2016. Translated by Marta Rebón. ISBN 978-84-15539-56-8
- (Vietnamese) Những cậu bé kẽm. Nhà xuất bản Phụ nữ. 2020. Translated by Phan Xuân Loan. ISBN 978-604-56-8452-8
