= Svetlana Alexievich =

Belarusian author and Nobel Prize winner (b. 1948)

- Святлана Алексіевіч; Светлана Алексиевич
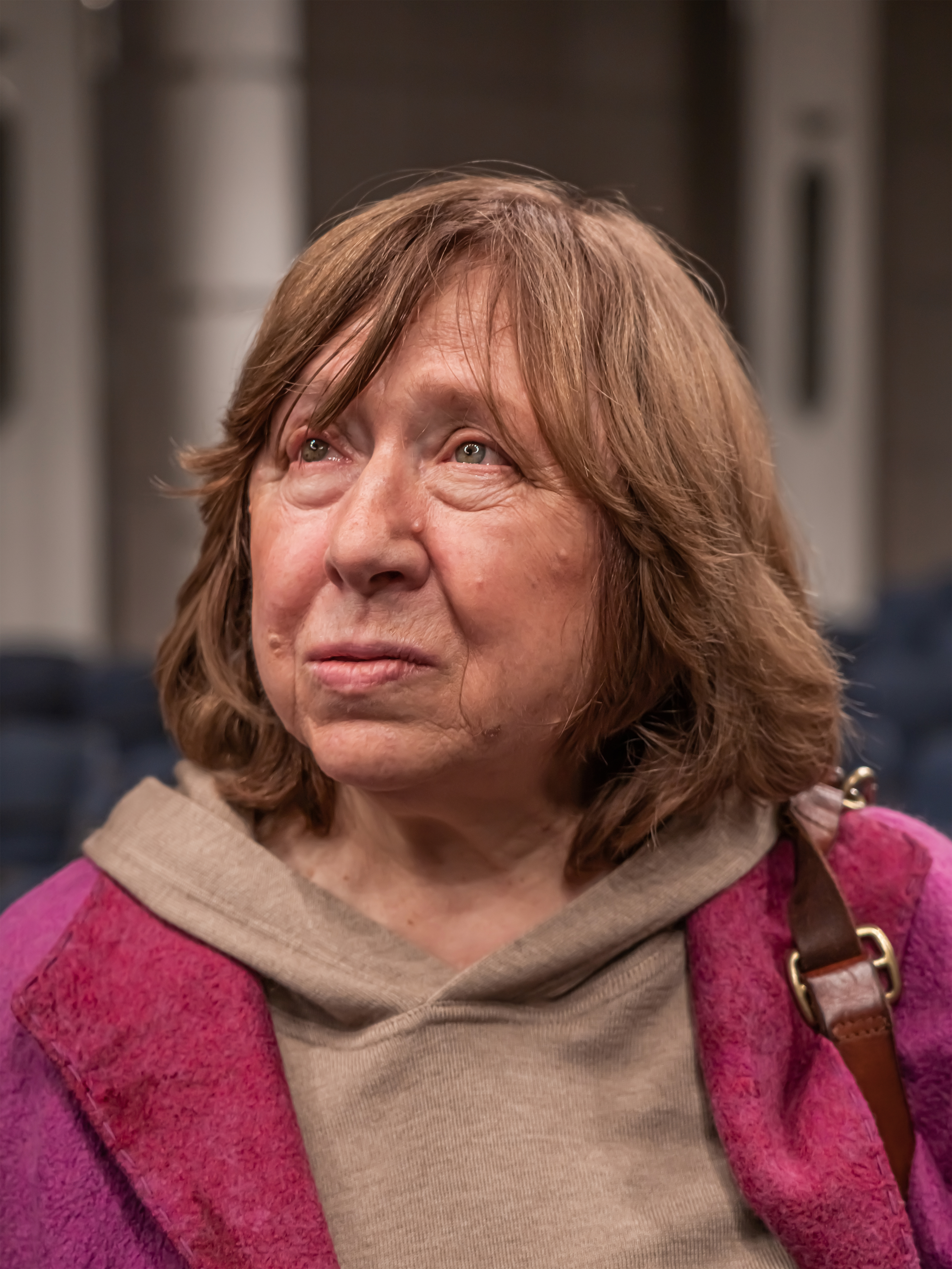
- Alexievich in 2024
- Born: Svetlana Alexandrovna Alexievich; 31 May 1948 (age 78); Stanislav, Ukrainian SSR, Soviet Union (now Ivano-Frankivsk, Ukraine)
- Citizenship: Belarus
- Education: Belarusian State University
- Writing career
- Language: Russian
- Notable awards: Nobel Prize in Literature (2015); Order of the Badge of Honour (1984); Order of the Arts and Letters (2014); Friedenspreis des Deutschen Buchhandels (2013); Prix Médicis (2013); Belarusian Democratic Republic 100th Jubilee Medal (2018)
- Website: alexievich.info

Signature
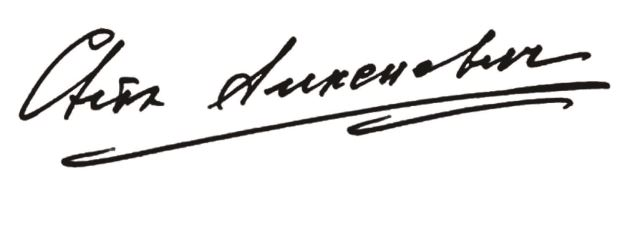

Svetlana Alexandrovna Alexievich (Note: Her name is also transliterated as Aleksievich or Aleksiyevich. Belarusian: Святла́на Алякса́ндраўна Алексіе́віч Svyatlana Alaksandrawna Aleksiyevich Belarusian pronunciation: [alʲɛksʲiˈjɛvʲit͡ʂ]; Russian: Светла́на Алекса́ндровна Алексие́вич Russian pronunciation: [ɐlʲɪksʲɪˈjevʲɪt͡ɕ]; Ukrainian: Світлана Олександрівна Алексієвич.) (born 31 May 1948) is a Belarusian author, investigative journalist, and oral historian who writes in Russian. She was awarded the 2015 Nobel Prize in Literature "for her polyphonic writings, a monument to suffering and courage in our time". She is the first writer from Belarus to receive the award.

== Biography ==
Born in the west Ukrainian town of Stanislav (Ivano-Frankivsk since 1962) to a Belarusian father and a Ukrainian mother. Both her parents were teachers; her father was also a village school principal. She spent her early childhood in Ukraine; the family then moved to Belarus. She visited her grandmother in Ukraine during summer holidays. After graduating from high school she worked as a reporter in several local newspapers. In 1972 she graduated from Belarusian State University and became a correspondent for the literary magazine Nyoman in Minsk (1976). Her first manuscript, Ya uyekhal iz derevni ('I left the village') was blocked for publication by Soviet censorship.

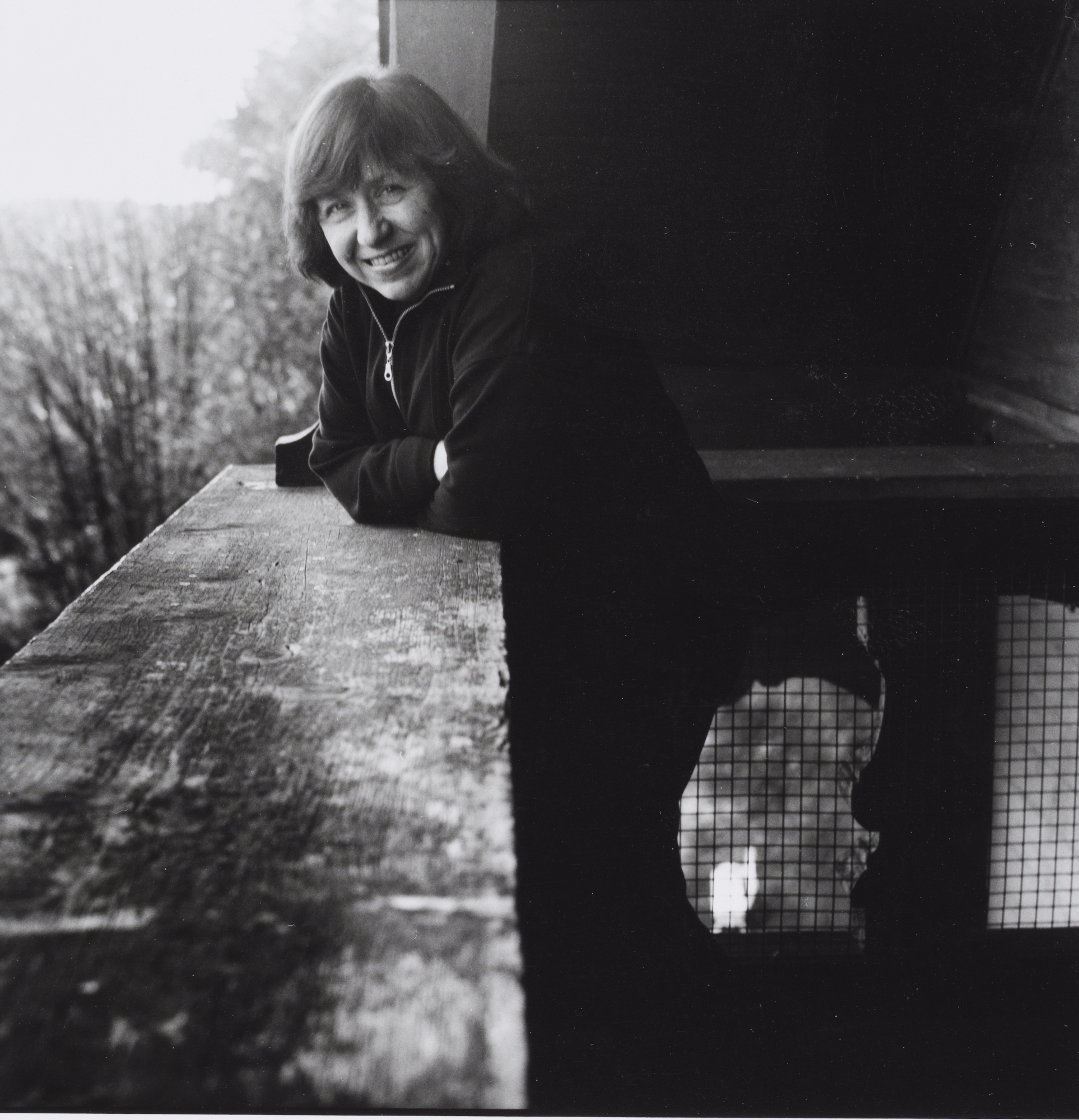
Alexievich as artist-in-residence at Bavarian Villa Waldberta in the 1990s

In 1989 Alexievich published Zinky Boys, a book about the fallen soldiers who had returned in zinc coffins from the Soviet-Afghan War of 1979 – 1989. She was accused of "defamation" and "desecration of the soldiers' honor". Alexievich was tried a number of times between 1992 and 1996; she was sued by four interviewees. Three claims were dismissed, and one was partially upheld. Alexievich later said that she couldn't locate the recordings in time. After political persecution by the Lukashenko administration, she left Belarus in 2000. The International Cities of Refuge Network offered her sanctuary, and during the following decade she lived in Paris, Gothenburg and Berlin. In 2011, Alexievich moved back to Minsk.

Alexievich was awarded the 2015 Nobel Prize in Literature. In her first public statement after she was announced the Nobel Prize winner, she condemned Russia's annexation of Crimea in 2014.

Her books were not published by Belarusian state-owned publishing houses after 1993, while private publishers in Belarus have only published two of her books: Chernobyl Prayer in 1999 and Secondhand Time: The Last of the Soviets in 2013, both translated into Belarusian. As a result, Alexievich has been better known in the rest of the world than in Belarus.

She has been described as the first journalist to receive the Nobel Prize in Literature. She disagrees that her work is journalism; the genre she works in is sometimes called "documentary literature".

In her own words:

I've been searching for a literary method that would allow the closest possible approximation to real life. Reality has always attracted me like a magnet, it tortured and hypnotized me, I wanted to capture it on paper. So I immediately appropriated this genre of actual human voices and confessions, witness evidences and documents. This is how I hear and see the world – as a chorus of individual voices and a collage of everyday details. This is how my eye and ear function. In this way all my mental and emotional potential is realized to the full. In this way I can be simultaneously a writer, reporter, sociologist, psychologist and preacher.

On 26 October 2019, Alexievich was elected chairman of the Belarusian PEN Center.

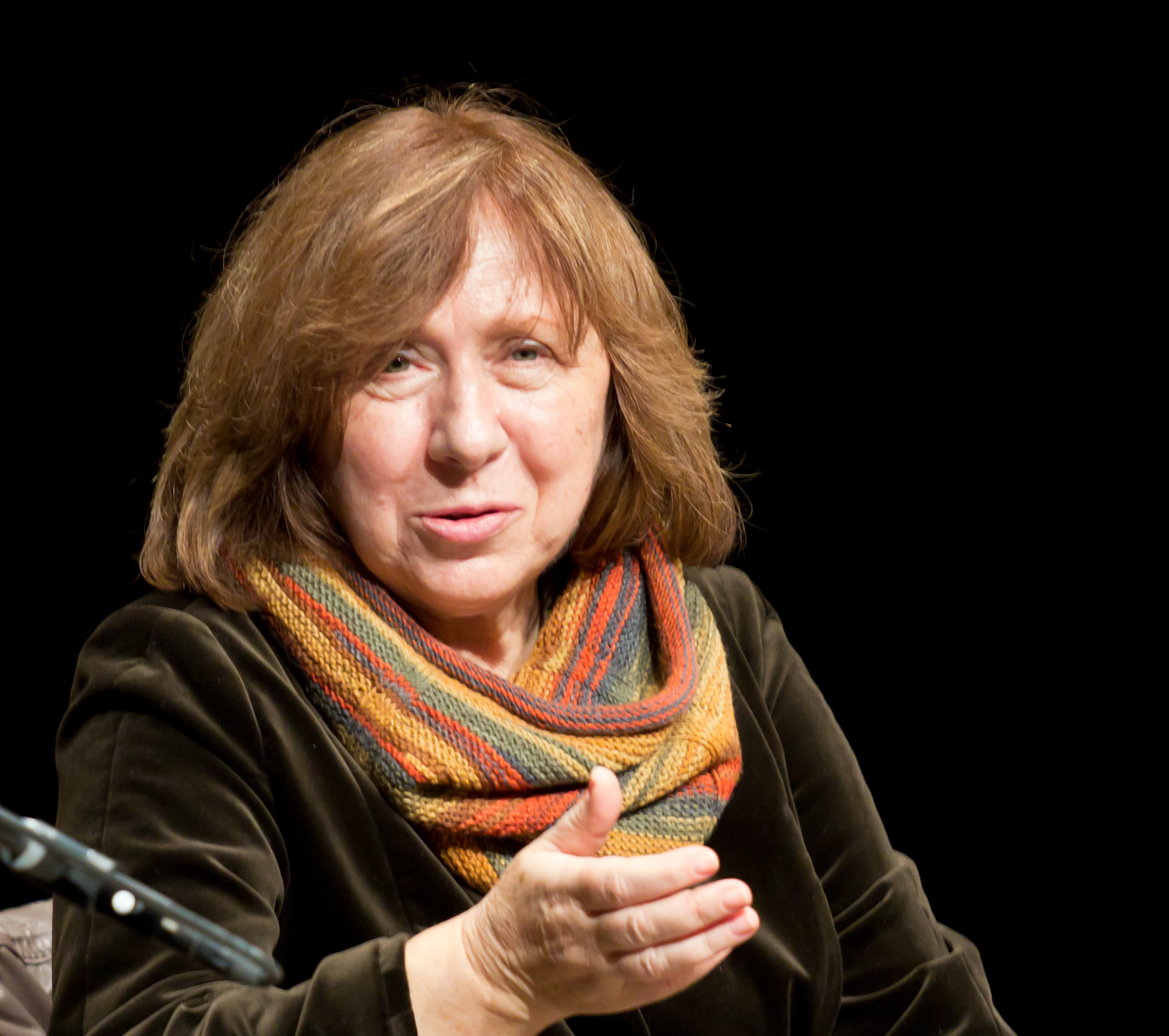
Alexievich in 2013

During the 2020 Belarusian protests, Alexievich became a member of the Coordination Council of Sviatlana Tsikhanouskaya, the leader of the Belarusian democratic movement and main opposition candidate against Lukashenko.

On 20 August, Alexander Konyuk, the Prosecutor-General of Belarus, initiated criminal proceedings against the members of the Coordination Council under Article 361 of the Belarusian Criminal Code, on the grounds of attempting to seize state power and harming national security. On 26 August, Alexievich was questioned by Belarusian authorities about her involvement in the council. On 9 September 2020, Alexievich alerted the press that "men in black masks" were trying to enter her apartment in central Minsk. "I have no friends and companions left in the Coordinating Council. All are in prison or have been forcibly sent into exile," she wrote in a statement. "First they kidnapped the country; now it's the turn of the best among us. But hundreds more will replace those who have been torn from our ranks. It is not the Coordinating Council that has rebelled. It is the country." Diplomats from Lithuania, Poland, the Czech Republic, Romania, Slovakia, and Sweden began to keep a round-the-clock watch on Alexievich's home to prevent her abduction by security services.

On 28 September 2020, Alexievich left Belarus for Germany, promising to return depending on political conditions in Belarus. Prior to her departure, she was the last member of the Coordination Council who was not in exile or under arrest.

In August 2021, her book The Last Witnesses was excluded from the school curriculum in Belarus and her name was removed from the curriculum. It was assumed that the exclusion was made for her political activity. In 2026, a Belarusian court added a collection of quotes by Alexievich to the list of extremist materials.

Following the 2022 Russian invasion of Ukraine, she commented that "providing a territory for an aggressor country is nothing but complicity in a crime" in relation to Belarusian involvement in the 2022 Russian invasion of Ukraine.

== Works ==
Her first book, War's Unwomanly Face, came out in 1985. It was repeatedly reprinted and sold more than two million copies. The book was finished in 1983 and published (in short edition) in Oktyabr, a Soviet monthly literary magazine, in February 1984. In 1985, the book was published by several publishers, and the number of printed copies reached 2,000,000 in the next five years. This non-fiction oral history book is made up of monologues of women in the war speaking about the aspects of World War II that had never been related before. Another book, The Last Witnesses: the Book of Unchildlike Stories, describes personal memories of children during wartime. The war seen through women's and children's eyes revealed a new world of feelings.

In 1989, Alexievich published "Boys in Zinc". The course of the Soviet-Afghan War (1979–1989) is told through personal testimony from anonymous participants of the war; from nurses to commissioned officers and pilots, mothers and widows. Each provides an excerpt of the Soviet-Afghan War which was disguised in the face of criticism first as political support, then intervention, and finally humanitarian aid to the Afghan people. Alexievich writes at the beginning of the book:

After the great wars of the twentieth century and the mass deaths, writing about the modern (small) wars, like the war in Afghanistan, requires different ethical and metaphysical stances. What must be reclaimed is the small, the personal, and the specific. The single human being. The only human being for someone, not as the state regards him, but who he is for his mother, for his wife, for his child. How can we recover a normal vision of life?

According to Alexievich, she obtained permission to travel to the war zone through a Writers' Union contact she believed was a KGB officer and travelled with a writers’ delegation. A colonel was subsequently assigned to monitor her. In "Boys in Zinc", Alexievich calls herself 'a historian of the untraceable' and 'strive[s] desperately (from book to book) to do one thing - reduce history to the human being.' She brings brutally honest accounts of the war to lay at the feet of the Soviet people but claims no heroism for herself: 'I went [to watch them assemble pieces of boys blown up by an anti-tank mine] and there was nothing heroic about it because I fainted there. Perhaps it was from the heat, perhaps from the shock. I want to be honest.' The monologues which make up the book are honest (if edited for clarity) reproductions of the oral histories Alexievich collected, including those who perhaps did not understand her purpose: 'What's your book for? Who's it for? None of us who came back from there will like it anyway. How can you possibly tell people how it was? The dead camels and dead men lying in a single pool of blood, with their blood mingled together. Who wants that?' Alexievich was brought to trial in Minsk between 1992 and 1996, accused of distorting and falsifying the testimony of Afghan veterans and their mothers who were 'offended [...] that their boys were portrayed exclusively as soulless killer-robots, pillagers, drug addicts and rapists...' The trial, while apparently defending the honour of the army and veterans, is widely seen as an attempt to preserve old ideology in post-communist Belarus. The Belarus League for Human Rights claims that in the early 1990s, multiple cases were directed against democratically inclined intelligentsia with politically motivated verdicts.

In 1993, she published Enchanted by Death, a book about attempted and completed suicides due to the downfall of the Soviet Union. Many people felt inseparable from the Communist ideology and were unable to accept the new order surely and the newly interpreted history.

== Influences and legacy ==
Alexievich's books trace the emotional history of the Soviet and post-Soviet individual through carefully constructed collages of interviews. According to Russian writer and critic Dmitry Bykov, her books owe much to the ideas of Belarusian writer Ales Adamovich, who felt that the best way to describe the horrors of the 20th century was not by creating fiction but through recording the testimonies of witnesses. Belarusian poet Uladzimir Nyaklyayew called Adamovich "her literary godfather". He also named the documentary novel I'm From Fire Village (Belarusian: Я з вогненнай вёскі) by Ales Adamovich, Janka Bryl and Uladzimir Kalesnik, about the villages burned by the German troops during the occupation of Belarus, as the main single book that has influenced Alexievich's attitude to literature. Alexievich has confirmed the influence of Adamovich and Belarusian writer Vasil Bykaŭ, among others. She regards Varlam Shalamov as the best writer of the 20th century.

In a 2015 interview, she mentioned early influences: "I explored the world through people like Hanna Krall and Ryszard Kapuściński."

Alexievich describes the theme of her works this way:

If you look back at the whole of our history, both Soviet and post-Soviet, it is a huge common grave and a blood bath. An eternal dialog of the executioners and the victims. The accursed Russian questions: what is to be done and who is to blame. The revolution, the gulags, the Second World War, the Soviet–Afghan war hidden from the people, the downfall of the great empire, the downfall of the giant socialist land, the land-utopia, and now a challenge of cosmic dimensions – Chernobyl. This is a challenge for all the living things on earth. Such is our history. And this is the theme of my books, this is my path, my circles of hell, from man to man.

== Awards and honours ==
Alexievich has received many awards, including:

- Saint Euphrosyne of Polotsk Medal (Медаль имени Святой Евфросиньи Полоцкой)
- 1984 — Order of the Badge of Honour (USSR)
- 1984 — Nikolay Ostrovskiy literary award of the Union of Soviet Writers
- 1984 — Oktyabr Magazine Prize
- 1985 — Литературная премия имени Константина Федина of the Union of Soviet Writers
- 1986 — Lenin Komsomol Prize — for the book «У войны не женское лицо»
- 1987 — Literaturnaya Gazeta Prize
- 1996 — Tucholsky-Preis (Swedish PEN)
- 1997 — Friendship of the Peoples Magazine Prize
- 1997 — Triumph Prize (Russia)
- 1997 — Andrei Sinyavsky Prize of Novaya Gazeta
- 1998 — Leipzig Book Award for European Understanding
- 1998 — Friedrich-Ebert-Stiftung-Preis
- 1999 — Herder Prize
- 2005 — National Book Critics Circle Award, Voices from Chernobyl
- 2007 — Oxfam Novib/PEN Award
- 2011 — Ryszard Kapuściński Award (Poland)
- 2011 — Angelus Award (Poland)
- 2013 — Peace Prize of the German Book Trade
- 2013 — Prix Médicis essai, La Fin de l'homme rouge ou le temps du désenchantement (for her book Secondhand Time)
- 2014 — Officer of the Order of the Arts and Letters (France)
- 2015 — Nobel Prize in Literature
- 2017 — Arthur Ross Book Award Bronze Medal given by the Council on Foreign Relations for her book Secondhand Time
- 2017 — Golden Plate Award from the American Academy of Achievement.
- 2018 — Belarusian Democratic Republic 100th Jubilee Medal
- 2020 — Sakharov Prize for Freedom of Thought by the European Parliament (one of the named representatives of the democratic opposition in Belarus)
- 2021 — Sonning Prize
- 2021 — Order of Merit of the Federal Republic of Germany (Commander's Cross)

Alexievich is a member of the advisory committee of the Lettre Ulysses Award. She gave the inaugural Anna Politkovskaya Memorial Lecture at the British Library on 9 October 2019. The lecture is an international platform to amplify the voices of women journalists and human rights defenders working in war and conflict zones.

== Bibliography ==
Alexievich considers all her books part of a project she calls "Voices of Utopia".

Original work	English editions
У войны не женское лицо (U voyny ne zhenskoe litso); Minsk: Mastatskaya litaratura, 1985	The Unwomanly Face of War, extracts in Always a Woman: Stories by Soviet Women Writers. Raduga Publishers, 1987.; War's Unwomanly Face. Moscow: Progress Publishers, 1988. ISBN 9785010004941.; The Unwomanly Face of War: An Oral History of Women in World War II. Random House, 2017. ISBN 9780399588723.
Последние свидетели: сто недетских колыбельных (Poslednie svideteli: sto nedetskikh kolybelnykh); Moscow: Molodaya Gvardiya, 1985	Last Witnesses: An Oral History of the Children of World War II. Random House, 2019. ISBN 9780399588754. Translated by Richard Pevear and Larissa Volokhonsky.
Цинковые мальчики (Tsinkovye malchiki); Moscow: Molodaya Gvardiya, 1989	Zinky Boys: Soviet Voices from the Afghanistan War. W. W. Norton, 1992. ISBN 9780393034158. Translated by Julia and Robin Whitby. (UK); Boys in Zinc. Penguin Modern Classics, 2016. ISBN 9780241264119. Translated by Andrew Bromfield. (US)
Зачарованные смертью (Zacharovannye smertyu, Enchanted by Death); Belarusian edition, 1993; Russian edition, 1994	—
Чернобыльская молитва (Chernobylskaya molitva); Moscow: Ostozhye, 1997. ISBN 9785860950887	Voices from Chernobyl: The Oral History of a Nuclear Disaster. Dalkey Archive Press, 2005. ISBN 9781564784018. Translated by Keith Gessen. (US); Chernobyl Prayer: A Chronicle of the Future. Penguin Modern Classics, 2016. ISBN 9780241270530. Translated by Anna Gunin and Arch Tait. New translation of the revised 2013 edition. (UK)
Время секонд хэнд (Vremya sekond khend); Moscow: Vremia, 2013	Secondhand Time: The Last of the Soviets. Random House, 2016. ISBN 9780399588808. Translated by Bela Shayevich.
