= War locomotive =

Articles on War locomotive include:

- Kriegslokomotive, German war locomotive
- ROD 2-8-0, British war locomotive
- USATC S160 Class, U.S. war locomotive
- WD Austerity 2-8-0, British war locomotive
- WD Austerity 2-10-0, British war locomotive
