= Border War =

Border War may refer to:

== Military conflicts ==
- Paduan–Venetian border war (1372–1373)
- Border War or Bleeding Kansas (1854–1859), a series of violent events involving Free-Staters and pro-slavery elements prior to the American Civil War
- Border War (1910–1919), border conflicts between the United States and Mexico
- South African Border War (1966–1989) in Namibia and Angola
- List of border conflicts for wars fought on borders

== Sports ==
- Border Wars (professional wrestling), an annual professional wrestling pay-per-view event
  - Border Wars (2012 wrestling event), the 2012 event
  - Border Wars (2013 wrestling event), the 2013 event

=== Athletic rivalries ===
- Border War (Kansas–Missouri rivalry), officially known as the "Border Showdown" after September 11, 2001, the sports rivalry between the University of Kansas and the University of Missouri
- Border War (Colorado State–Wyoming rivalry), the sports rivalry between Colorado State University and the University of Wyoming
- Oregon–Washington football rivalry, the college football game played between the University of Oregon and the University of Washington
- Maine–New Hampshire men's ice hockey rivalry, the men's college ice hockey rivalry between the New Hampshire Wildcats and the Maine Black Bears

== Other uses ==
- Border War: The Battle Over Illegal Immigration, a 2006 documentary about the U.S.–Mexico border
- Border Wars (TV series), a television series on the National Geographic Channel
- Border Wars (album) an album by American rappers Berner and The Jacka

== See also ==
- Border Battle (disambiguation)
