= War rug =

Textile art from Afghanistan

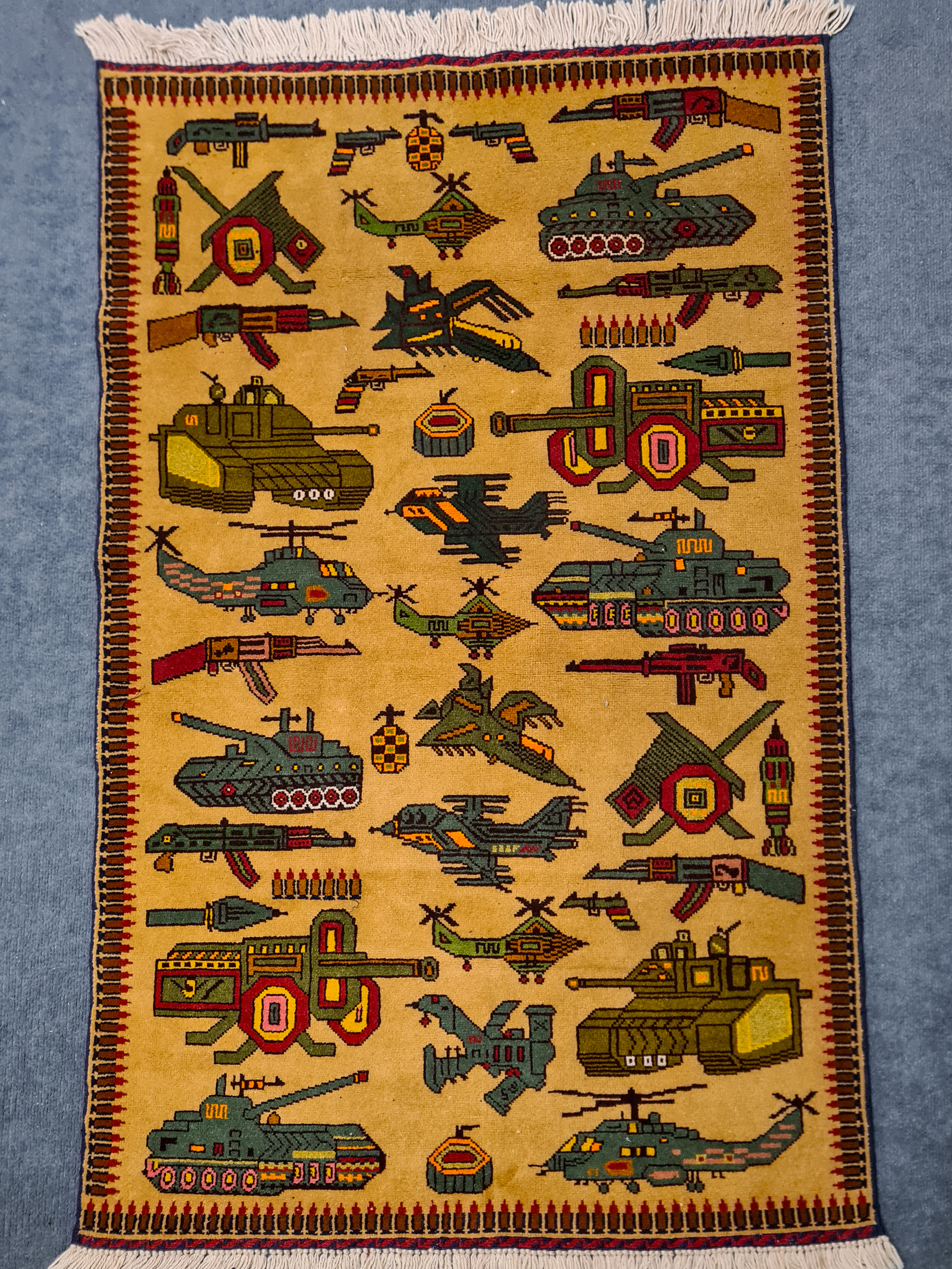
A war rug from the Ghazni region depicting Soviet weapons and vehicles used during the occupation between 1979-1989.

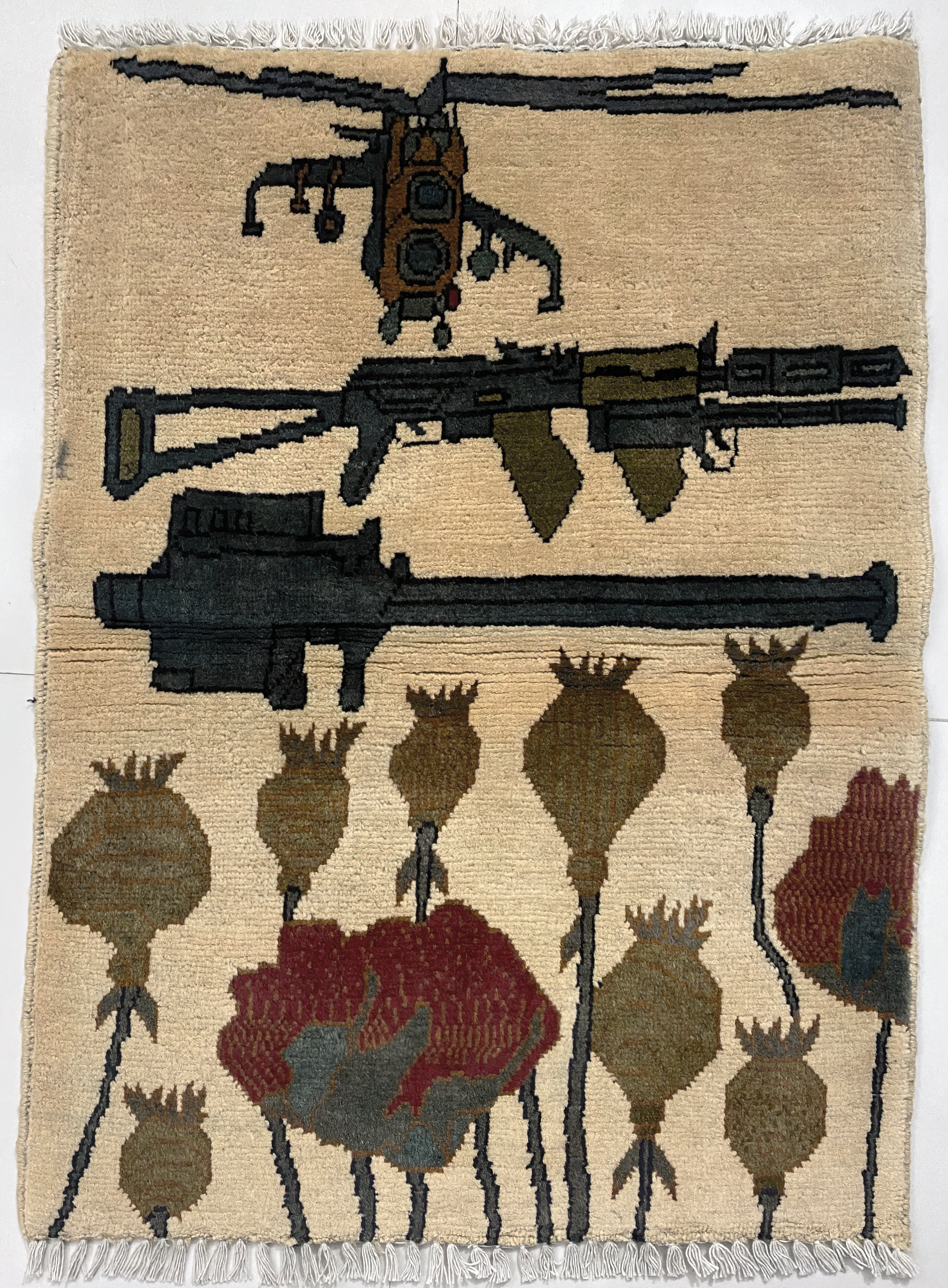
Afghan war rug depicting poppies, an AK-style rifle, a "Stinger" MANPAD system, and a Mi-24D Helicopter

The war rug (Dari: فرش جنگی, romanized: farš jangi) tradition of Afghanistan has its origins in the decade of Soviet occupation of Afghanistan from 1979 and has continued through the subsequent military, political and social conflicts. Afghan rug-makers began incorporating the apparatus of war into their designs almost immediately after the Soviet Union invaded their country. War rugs continue to be sold, with patterns evolving over time, depicting weaponry such as drones and events such as the 2021 Fall of Kabul.

The terms Baluch and war rug are generalizations given to the genre by rug dealers, commercial galleries, collectors, critics, and commentators. The rugs are characterized as conveying their makers' experiences and interpretations of the circumstances and politics of war and conflict in the region.

Professor Jamal J. Elias has stated that war rugs are made not to reflect the experiences of their creators, but in response to market demand. Rug brokers and dealers have responded to the market for war rugs, supplying individual creators in bulk with patterns and materials. The rugs are then produced in bulk by individual weavers, including children, working from home. Finished rugs are sold by the brokers, with individual weavers seeing little of the profits.

Since the withdrawal of the USSR, the same themes and subjects have been reused and remade. Additionally, after 9/11 the events of that day were recorded in carpets, and more recently – since 2015 – drones have appeared as subject matter.

== Literature ==
- Jürgen Wasim Frembgen and Hans Werner Mohm: Lebensbaum und Kalaschnikow. Krieg und Frieden im Spiegel afghanischer Bildteppiche, Gollenstein Verlag (publishers), Blieskastel (in Germany), 2000, ISBN 978-3933389312. (This is the first known serious and detailed study of any substance in the field of the so-called "War Rugs" from Afghanistan.)
- Tim Bonyhady, Nigel Lendon and Jasleen Dhamija: The rugs of war, Canberra : Australian National University, School of Art, Gallery, 2003. ISBN 0731530306
- Enrico Mascelloni: War Rugs: The Nightmare of Modernism, Skira, 2009, ISBN 978-8861308664.
- Till Passow & Thomas Wild (ed.): Knotted Memories: War in Afghan Rug Art, Catalogue to accompany the exhibition featuring selected pieces from Till Passow's collection of Afghan war rugs, 27 February – 20 March 2015 (German and English), Berlin 2015, ISBN 978-3-00-048784-2.
- Kevin Sudeith; War Rugs Volume One:Pictorial, ISBN 978-0-9974233-1-0 Mosques, monuments, minarets, and modern cities in war rugs from 1981 through 2010. This book demonstrates how some war rugs grew out of the long tradition of landscape pictorial rugs as well as the way contemporary weavers combined ancient religious and martial architectural structures with the most high tech imagery.
- Amedeo Vittorio Bedini and Luca Emilio Brancati: Tappeti delle guerre afghane, Milano, Luni, 2021, ISBN 978-8879847520.
