= Last Witnesses =

- Author: Svetlana Alexandrovna Alexievich
- Language: Russian
- Series: Voices from Utopia
- Genre: non-fiction
- Publisher: Molodaya Gvardiya
- Publication date: 1985
- Preceded by: The Unwomanly Face of War
- Followed by: Chernobyl Prayer

The Last Witnesses is a documentary-fiction book by the Belarusian writer Svetlana Alexievich, winner of the 2015 Nobel Prize in Literature. It was first published, with the subtitle A Book of Unchildlike Stories, in the tenth issue of the journal Oktyabr in 1985. It was also published as a separate edition in 1985 with the same subtitle (while later editions bore the subtitle Solo for a Child's Voice). The book is composed of recollections by people who experienced the Great Patriotic War as children, continuing the theme begun in The Unwomanly Face of War. It constitutes the second part of the documentary-fiction cycle Voices from Utopia.

== Works based on the book ==
A documentary film based on the book, Children of War: Last Witnesses, was directed by Alexei Kitaytsev from a screenplay by Lyudmila Romanenko. Svetlana Alexievich appears in the film. It was produced by MB Group, Moscow, in 2009, and has a running time of 45 minutes. The film received a special prize in the open documentary competition Man and War in Yekaterinburg in 2011.

Composer Vladimir Magdalits wrote the symphony-requiem Last Witnesses, a composition for reader, bass, piano, organ, mixed and children's choirs, and symphony orchestra.
