= War Paint =

War paint is paint ritually applied to the face and/or body prior to going into a battle.

War Paint or Warpaint may also refer to:

== Music ==
- Warpaint (band), an American indie rock band from Los Angeles
  - Warpaint (Warpaint album), 2014 album by Warpaint
  - "Warpaint", song by Warpaint from The Fool (2010)

=== Albums ===
- Warpaint (Happy Rhodes album), or the title song (1991)
- War Paint (Lorrie Morgan album), or the title song (1994)
- Warpaint (The Black Crowes album) (2008)
- War Paint (The Dangerous Summer album), or the title song (2011)

=== Songs ===
- "War Paint" (Fletcher song) (2015)
- "War Paint" (Madeline Merlo song) (2016)
- "War Paint", by Gwen Stefani from This Is What the Truth Feels Like (2016)
- "Warpaint", by Ivory Hours (2015)
- "War Paint", by Kelly Clarkson from Piece by Piece (2015)
- "War Paint", by Rush from Presto (1989)
- "War Paint", by Jonah Marais

== Films ==
- War Paint (1926 film), a western by W. S. Van Dyke
- War Paint (1953 film), a western starring Robert Stack and Joan Taylor
- Iliza Shlesinger: War Paint, a 2013 stand-up comedy film

== Other uses ==
- War Paint (horse), (c. 1945) a ProRodeo Hall of Fame bucking horse
- Warpaint (mascot), a mascot of the Kansas City Chiefs NFL team
- War Paint (musical), a Broadway musical based on the rivalry between Elizabeth Arden and Helena Rubinstein
- Luxilus coccogenis or warpaint shiner
- War Paint, a Disney comic by Carl Barks
- Military camouflage
