= Minesweeper (disambiguation) =

A minesweeper is a warship for mine removal.

Minesweeper may also refer to:

- Minesweeper (film), a 1943 American film by William Berke
- Minesweeper (video game), a logic game genre
  - Microsoft Minesweeper, a 1990 implementation on MS Windows
- Jean-Luc Dehaene or 'The Minesweeper', Belgian prime minister from 1992 to 1999
- "The Sweepers" (poem), or "Mine Sweepers", by Rudyard Kipling

== See also ==
- Demining
