= Jürgen Wasim Frembgen =

Jürgen Wasim Frembgen (born in 1955) is a German ethnologist and scholar who is an associate professor of Islamic religious and cultural history at LMU Munich. He is also the chief curator of the Museum of Ethnology, Munich.

Frembgen is known for his work on Sufism in Pakistan and has written multiple books on this subject. Among the books that have been reviewed by multiple publications, include The Closed Valley: With Fierce Friends in the Pakistani Himalayas, The Friends of God: Sufi Saints in Islam, We are Lovers of the Qalandar: Piety, Pilgrimage and Ritual in Pakistani Sufi Islam, At the Shrine of the Red Sufi.

== Bibliography ==
- The Friends of God: Sufi Saints in Islam
- Journey to God: Sufis and Dervishes in Islam
- A Thousand Cups of Tea
- The Closed Valley: With Fierce Friends in the Pakistani Himalayas
- At the Shrine of the Red Sufi
- We are Lovers of the Qalandar: Piety, Pilgrimage and Ritual in Pakistani Sufi Islam
- At the Foot of the Fairy Mountain: The Nagerkuts of the Karakoram/Northern Pakistan
- Das verschlossene Tal
