= List of wars: 1500–1799 =

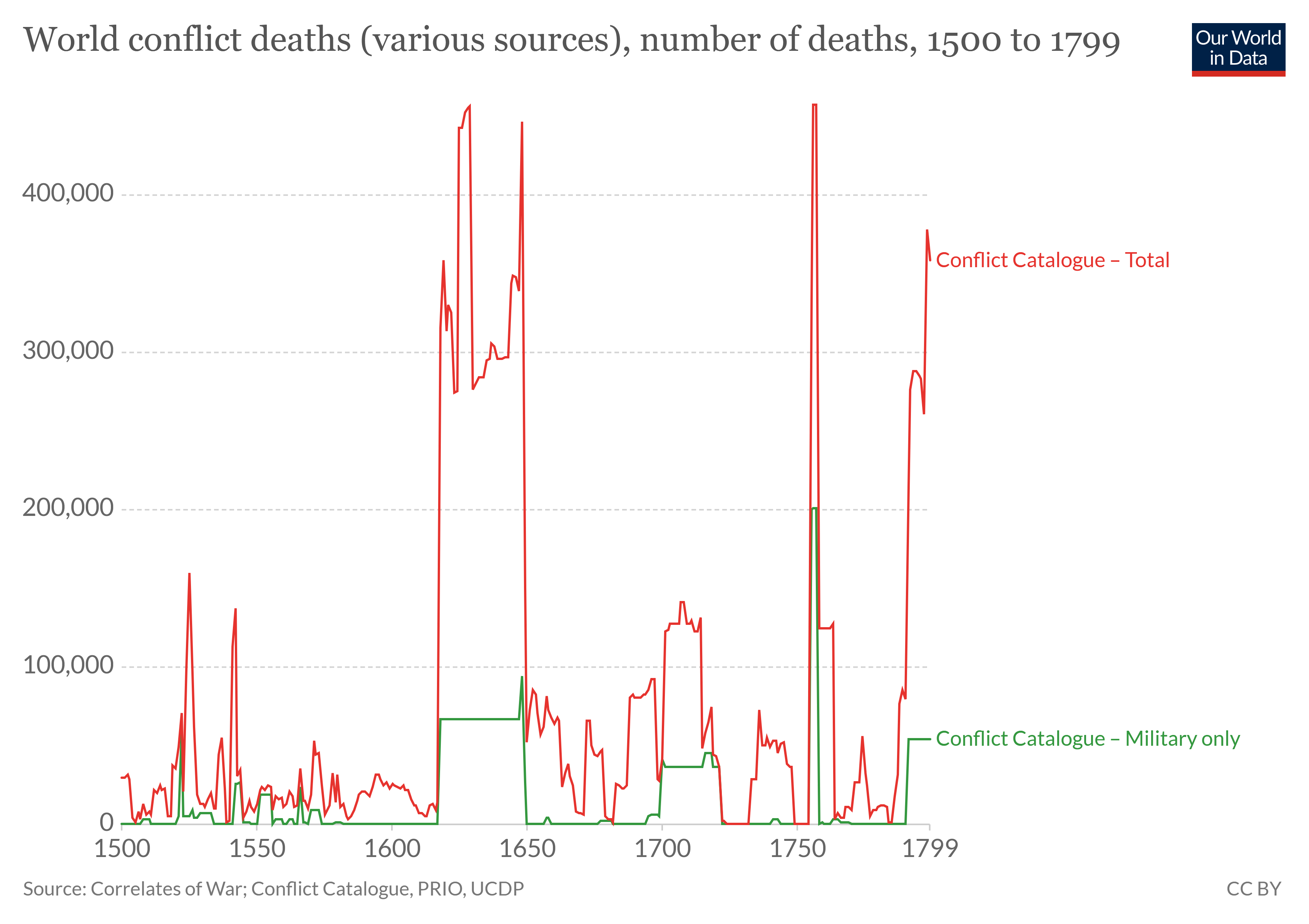
Graph of global conflict deaths from 1500 to 1799 from various sources.

This is a list of wars that began between 1500 and 1799. Other wars can be found in the historical lists of wars and the list of wars extended by diplomatic irregularity. Major conflicts of this era include the Italian Wars and Thirty Years' War in Europe, the Kongo Civil War in Africa, the Qing conquest of the Ming in Asia, the Spanish conquest of Peru in South America, and the American Revolutionary War in North America.

Based on statistics from Our World in Data (starting in 1400), 1525 (the end of the German Peasants' War) was, at its time, the deadliest year in terms of conflict deaths with 160k deaths, until it was surpassed by 1618 which saw 316k deaths. As the Thirty Years' War (1618–1648) and the Manchu conquest of China (1618–1683) continued, 1618 was surpassed by 1619 (359k deaths), 1625 (443k deaths), 1627 (453k deaths), 1628 (456k deaths) and 1629 (456.8k deaths). 1629 was later surpassed by 1756 (457.5k deaths), at the start of the Seven Years' War.

== 1500–1599 ==
Start	Finish	Name of conflict	Belligerents	
Start	Finish	Name of conflict	Victorious party (if applicable)	Defeated party (if applicable)
1500	1500	Bruneian–Tundun War	Bruneian Empire	Tondo
1500	1503	Second Muscovite–Lithuanian War; Muscovite–Lithuanian Wars	Grand Principality of Moscow	Grand Duchy of Lithuania
1500	1500	Battle of Hemmingstedt	Peasantry of Dithmarschen	Kalmar Union Denmark
1501	1502	Azov War (1501–1502)	Kabardia	Crimean Khanate
1501	1512	Dano-Swedish War (1501–1512) Part of the Dano-Swedish Wars	Sweden; Free City of Lübeck (from 1509); Norwegian rebels (to 1504)	Kalmar Union: Denmark; Norway
1502	1510	Persian–Uzbek wars	Persian Empire; Timurid Empire	(Uzbekistan) Shaybanid dynasty
1502	1543	Guelders Wars	Holy Roman Empire	Duchy of Guelders
1503	1505	War of the Succession of Landshut	Duchy of Bavaria-Munich	Duchy of Bavaria-Landshut; Electorate of the Palatinate
1505	1517	Portuguese–Mamluk naval war	Portugal	Mamluk Sultanate; Ottoman Empire
1505	1517	Ottoman–Persian War (1505–1517)	Ottoman Empire	Safavid Iran
1505	1506	Austrian-Hungarian War (1505-1506)	Holy Roman Empire	Kingdom of Hungary
1507	1508	Third Muscovite–Lithuanian War; Muscovite–Lithuanian Wars	Grand Duchy of Lithuania; Kingdom of Poland	Grand Principality of Moscow; Lithuanian rebels led by Michael Glinski
1508	1516	War of the League of Cambrai; Part of the Italian Wars and Anglo-French War (1512–14)	1508–10: France; Papal States; Holy Roman Empire; Spain; Duchy of Ferrara; 1511–13: France; Duchy of Ferrara; 1513–16: France; Venice; Scotland; Duchy of Ferrara	1508–10: Venice; 1510–11: Papal States; Venice; 1511–13: Papal States; Venice; Spain; Holy Roman Empire; England; Swiss mercenaries 1513–16: Papal States; Spain; Holy Roman Empire; England; Duchy of Milan; Swiss mercenaries
1509	1509	Second Invasion of the Kazakh Khanate (1509)	Kazakh Khanate	Khanate of Bukhara
1509	1509	Battle of Diu; Part of the Portuguese battles in Indian Ocean, Portuguese–Mamluk naval war and Ottoman–Portuguese confrontations	(Kingdom of Portugal) Portuguese Empire	Gujarat Sultanate; Mamlûk Sultanate; Kozhikode Zamorin Raja; Ottoman Empire; Republic of Venice; Republic of Ragusa
1509	1512	Ottoman Civil War	Forces of Selim I Forces of Bayezid II; Janissaries	Forces of Ahmed
1510	1510	Prince of Anhua rebellion	Ming dynasty	Prince of Anhua
1510	1514	Hvar rebellion	Republic of Venice	Hvar rebels
1510	1510	Portuguese conquest of Goa; Ottoman–Portuguese confrontations	Portugal	Bijapur Sultanate; Ottoman Empire
1511	1511	Friulian revolt of 1511	Friulian nobility	Friulian peasants
1511	1511	Şahkulu rebellion	Ottoman Empire	Shia Rebels
1511	1529	Spanish–Taíno War of San Juan–Borikén	Castile	Taínos
1511	1641	Malayan–Portuguese war	Portugal	Malacca Sultanate; Ming dynasty Dutch East India Company; Johor Sultanate
1512	1516	Bengal Sultanate–Kingdom of Mrauk U War	Bengal Sultanate	Kingdom of Mrauk U
1512	1522	Fourth Muscovite–Lithuanian War; Muscovite–Lithuanian Wars	Grand Principality of Moscow; Livonian Order	Grand Duchy of Lithuania; Kingdom of Poland; Crimean Tatars
1512	1521	Spanish conquest of Iberian Navarre	Crown of Castile; Crown of Aragon	Kingdom of Navarre
1514	1514	Poor Conrad Rebellion	Duchy of Württemberg	Württemberg peasants
1514	1514	György Dózsa Rebellion	Kingdom of Hungary	Hungarian peasants
1514	1514	Battle of Chaldiran	Ottoman Empire	Safavid Empire
1515	1515	Slovene Peasant Revolt of 1515	Holy Roman Empire	Slovene rebels
1515	1523	Arumer Zwarte Hoop	Habsburg Netherlands	Frisian peasants
1516	1516	Algiers expedition (1516)	Ottoman Empire	Castile
1516	1517	Ottoman–Mamluk War (1516–17); Part of the Ottoman–Mamluk wars	Ottoman Empire	Mamluk Sultanate
1516	1516		Tenochtitlan; Partisans of Cacamatzin	Tlaxcala; Partisans of Ixtlilxochitl II
1516	1521	Trần Cao rebellion	Lê dynasty	Trần Cao rebels
1518	1658	Sinhalese–Portuguese War	Portuguese Empire	Kingdom of Sitawaka; Kingdom of Kandy
1519	1519	Prince of Ning rebellion	Ming dynasty	Prince of Ning
1519	1521	Polish–Teutonic War (1519–1521); Polish–Teutonic wars	Kingdom of Poland	Teutonic Knights
1519	1521	Spanish conquest of the Aztec Empire	(Spanish Empire) Spanish Empire; Tlaxcala	Aztec Triple Alliance
1519	1523	Revolt of the Brotherhoods	Royalists of Aragon	Agermanats rebels
1519	1523	Hildesheim Diocesan Feud	Bishopric of Hildesheim; County of Schaumburg; County of Diepholz; County of Hoya	Principality of Brunswick-Wolfenbüttel; Principality of Calenberg
1519	1659	Celali rebellions	Ottoman Empire	Alevi peasants
1520	1521	Revolt of the Comuneros	Royalist Castilians	Comuneros rebels
1521	1521	First Battle of Tamão	Ming dynasty	Portuguese Empire
1521	1523	Swedish War of Liberation; Part of the Swedish War of Secession	Sweden; Free City of Lübeck (from 1522)	Denmark; Kalmar Union
1521	1526	Italian War of 1521–1526; Part of the Italian Wars	Empire of Charles V: (Spanish Empire) Spain; Holy Roman Empire; Kingdom of England; Papal States	France; Republic of Venice
1521	1532	Musso War	Three Leagues	Duchy of Milan
1522	1538	First Civil War (Kazakh Khanate)	Tugim Khan (Until 1538) Supported by: Khak-Nazar	Buydash Khan
1522	1523	Knights' War	Holy Roman Empire	Brotherly Convention’ of Knights
1522	1522	Second Battle of Tamão	Ming dynasty	Portuguese Empire
1522	1522	Siege of Rhodes (1522)	Ottoman Empire	(Sovereign Military Order of Malta) Knights Hospitaller; Republic of Venice
1523	1523	Franconian War	Swabian League	Robber Barons
1524	1525	German Peasants' War	Swabian League	German Peasant Army
1524	1533	Dalecarlian rebellions	Sweden	Dalarna peasants
1524	1528	Arghun–Langah War	Sindh Sultanate	Multan Sultanate
1525	1525	Bakhchisarai War (1525)	Kabardia	Crimean Khanate
1525	1525	Amicable Grant	Kingdom of England	English Rebels
1526	1530	War of the League of Cognac; Part of the Italian Wars	Empire of Charles V: (Spanish Empire) Spain; Holy Roman Empire; Republic of Genoa	France; Papal States; Republic of Venice; Republic of Florence; Kingdom of England; Duchy of Milan
1526	1526	Battle of Mohács	Ottoman Empire	Kingdom of Hungary; Kingdom of Bohemia; Holy Roman Empire; Duchy of Bavaria; Papal States; Kingdom of Poland
1527	1697	Spanish conquest of Yucatán	Spanish Empire	Maya
1527	1528	Hungarian campaign of 1527–1528; Part of the Ottoman–Habsburg wars	Archduchy of Austria; Holy Roman Empire; Spain; Kingdom of Bohemia; Kingdom of Croatia; Papal States; Ferdinand's Hungarian kingdom Voivodian Serbs	Ottoman Empire; Moldavia; John Szapolyai's Hungarian kingdom
1529	1543	Ethiopian–Adal War	Ethiopian Empire; Portuguese Empire	Adal Sultanate; Ottoman Empire
1529	1529	Westrogothian rebellion	Sweden	Swedish Catholics
1529	1529	First War of Kappel	Protestants: Zürich	Catholics: Uri; Schwyz; Zug
1529	1529	Suleiman I's campaign of 1529	Ottoman Empire; Moldavia; John Szapolyai's Hungarian kingdom	Archduchy of Austria; Holy Roman Empire; Spanish Empire; Kingdom of Bohemia; Papal States; Kingdom of Croatia; Ferdinand's Hungarian kingdom
1529	1529	Siege of Vienna	Holy Roman Empire; Kingdom of Bohemia; Electorate of the Palatinate; Spain	Ottoman Empire; Moldavia
1529	1532	Inca Civil War	Inca Empire under Atahualpa	Inca Empire under Huáscar; Tumebamba
1530	1552	Little War in Hungary; Part of the Ottoman–Habsburg wars	Archduchy of Austria; Holy Roman Empire; Spain; Papal States; Kingdom of Bohemia; Kingdom of Croatia; Ferdinand's Hungarian kingdom	Ottoman Empire; Moldavia; John Szapolyai's Hungarian kingdom Wallachia; Serbian Despotate; France
1531	1531	Second War of Kappel	Catholics: Uri; Schwyz; Zug	Protestants: Zürich
1532	1572	Spanish conquest of the Inca Empire	Spanish Empire	Inca Empire; Neo-Inca State
1532	1555	Ottoman–Safavid War (1532–1555); Part of the Ottoman–Persian wars	Ottoman Empire	Safavid Empire
1533	1929	Yaqui Wars; Part of the Mexican Indian Wars and the American Indian Wars	Crown of Castile (1533–1716) Spain (1716–1821) Mexico (1821–1929) United States (1896–1918)	Yaqui Allies: Mayo; Opata; Pima
1533	1677	Lê–Mạc War	Revival Lê dynasty	Mạc dynasty
1534	1534	Silken Thomas rebellion	Kingdom of England	Irish rebels
1534	1535	Münster rebellion	Prince-Bishopric of Münster	Anabaptists
1534	1536	Count's Feud	Christian III; Duchy of Schleswig; Holstein; Sweden; Duchy of Prussia; Jutland	Christian II; Christopher of Oldenburg; Free City of Lübeck; Scania; Malmö; Copenhagen; Zealand
1534	1537	Fifth Muscovite–Lithuanian War; Part of the Muscovite–Lithuanian Wars	Grand Duchy of Lithuania; Kingdom of Poland; Crimean Tatars	Grand Principality of Moscow
1534	1541	Toungoo–Hanthawaddy War	Toungoo dynasty	Hanthawaddy kingdom
1534	1536	Iguape War	Captaincies of Brazil	Spanish colonists Guaraní
1536	1537	Pilgrimage of Grace	Kingdom of England	English Roman Catholics
1536	1536	Möre uprising	Sweden	Möre Peasantry
1536	1538	Italian War of 1536–1538	France; Ottoman Empire	Holy Roman Empire (Spanish Empire) Spain
1537	1537	Bigod's rebellion	Kingdom of England	English Roman Catholics
1537	1540	Ottoman–Venetian War (1537–1540)	Ottoman Empire; France (until 1538); Regency of Algiers	Holy League: Republic of Venice; Spanish Empire: Kingdom of Naples; Kingdom of Sicily; Republic of Genoa; Papal States (Sovereign Military Order of Malta) Knights of Malta
1537	1548		(Spanish Empire) Governorate of New Castile (Spanish Empire) Viceroyalty of Peru	(Spanish Empire) Governorate of New Toledo
1538	1538	Yemeni Expedition of 1538 Part of the Yemeni–Ottoman conflicts	Ottoman Empire	Zaidis
1538	1545	Toungoo–Ava War	Toungoo dynasty	Ava Kingdom; Confederation of Shan States; Mrauk-U Kingdom; Prome Kingdom
1538	1560	Ottoman–Portuguese conflicts (1538–1559)	Portuguese Empire; Ethiopian Empire	Ottoman Empire; Adal Sultanate; Ajuran Sultanate; Gujarat Sultanate
1539	1540	Revolt of Ghent (1539–1540)	Holy Roman Empire	Ghent
1540	1540		Denmark–Norway	Norwegian peasants
1540	1542	Mixtón War	Spanish Empire	Caxcans
1540	1567	Jiajing wokou raids	Ming dynasty	Wokou
1542	1543	Dacke War	Sweden	Småland peasants
1542	1546	Italian War of 1542–1546; Part of the Italian Wars	France; Ottoman Empire; Jülich-Cleves-Berg	Empire of Charles V: Spain; Holy Roman Empire; Kingdom of England; Saxony; Brandenburg
1542	1551	Rough Wooing; Part of the Anglo-Scottish Wars	Kingdom of Scotland; Kingdom of France	Kingdom of England
1543	1568	Koch–Ahom conflicts	Kamata Kingdom	Ahom kingdom
1545	1547	Toungoo–Mrauk-U War	Kingdom of Mrauk U	Toungoo dynasty
1546	1547	Schmalkaldic War	Empire of Charles V: Spain; Holy Roman Empire; Duchy of Saxony; Kingdom of Hungary; Kingdom of Bohemia and other Lands of the Bohemian Crown	Schmalkaldic League: Electorate of Saxony; Hesse; Electorate of the Palatinate; Bremen; Free City of Lübeck; Brunswick-Lüneburg; Other German territories
1547	1549	Burmese–Siamese War (1547–1549)	Ayutthaya Kingdom	Toungoo dynasty
1548	1549	Revolt of the Pitauds	France	Tax Resisters
1549	1549	Prayer Book Rebellion	Kingdom of England	Catholic rebels
1549	1549	Buckinghamshire and Oxfordshire rising of 1549	Kingdom of England	English rebels
1549	1549	Kett's Rebellion	Kingdom of England	English peasants
1550	1590	Chichimeca War	Chichimeca	Spanish Empire
1551	1556	Temryuk War	Kabardia; Bzhedug; Principality of Hatuqay	Crimean Khanate
1551	1553	Lappvesi Peasant Revolt (1551–1553)	Sweden	Finnish Peasants; Karelians
1551	1559	Italian War of 1551–1559	Spanish Empire; Holy Roman Empire; Kingdom of England; Republic of Florence; Duchy of Savoy	Kingdom of France; Republic of Siena; Ottoman Empire
1552	1555	Second Margrave War	Margravate of Brandenburg-Kulmbach	Imperial City of Nuremberg; Prince-Bishopric of Bamberg; Imperial City Schweinfurt; Bishopric of Würzburg; Archbishopric of Mainz; Archbishopric of Trier; Bishopric of Speyer; Electorate of Saxony; Duchy of Brunswick-Lüneburg; Kingdom of Bohemia; Margravate of Meissen
1552	1552	Tuggurt Expedition	Regency of Algiers; Kingdom of Beni Abbas	Sultanate of Tuggurt
1552	1552	Siege of Kazan	Tsardom of Russia; Qasim Khanate; Taw yağı	Kazan Khanate; Cheremis and Ar warriors Nogay cavalry
1552	1556	Kazan rebellion of 1552–1556	Tsardom of Russia; Hill Cheremisa	People of Kazan; Chyuvasha; Meadow Cheremisa; Hill Cheremisa; Ar people Nogai Horde
1554	1554	Wyatt's rebellion	Kingdom of England	Rebels under Thomas Wyatt
1554	1557	Russo-Swedish War (1554–1557)	Tsardom of Russia	Sweden
1555	1558	Saukrieg	Party of Hans von Carlowitz	Party of John IX of Haugwitz
1555	1567	France Antarctique	Portuguese Empire; Tamoio People	France; Tupinambá People
1557	1589	Ottoman conquest of Habesh	Ottoman Empire	Habesh
1558	1566	Ottoman–Portuguese conflicts (1538–1559)	Portuguese Empire	Ottoman Empire: Egypt; Barbary States
1558	1567	Shane O'Neill's rebellion	Kingdom of England	Irish Rebels
1558	1583	Livonian War	Livonian Confederation; Polish–Lithuanian Commonwealth (before 1569 the Polish–Lithuanian union); Denmark–Norway; Sweden; Zaporozhian Cossacks; Principality of Transylvania (after 1577)	Tsardom of Russia; Kingdom of Livonia
1559	1559	Crimean-Circassian War (1569)	Kabardia	Crimean Khanate
1560	1621	Portuguese conquest of the Jaffna kingdom	Kingdom of Portugal	Jaffna Kingdom
1562	1598	French Wars of Religion	(Kingdom of France) Politiques	Protestants: Huguenots; England Catholics: Catholic League (Spanish Empire) Spain; Duchy of Savoy
1563	1564	Burmese–Siamese War (1563–1564)	Toungoo dynasty	Ayutthaya Kingdom
1563	1570	Northern Seven Years' War	Sweden	Denmark–Norway Free City of Lübeck; Poland–Lithuania
1564	1565	Mariovo and Prilep rebellion	Ottoman Empire	Christian rebels
1564	1567	Mughal conquest of Garha	Mughal Empire	Garha Kingdom
1567	1872	Philippine revolts against Spain	Spain; Filipino Loyalists	Dagohoy rebel group other Filipino rebel groups British supporters
1568	1570	Burmese–Siamese War (1568–1569)	Toungoo dynasty Burmese-controlled Thai states	Siam; Lan Xang
1568	1571	Rebellion of the Alpujarras (Morisco Revolt)	Spain	Moriscos
1568	1573	Marian civil war	King's Men	Queen's Men
1568	1648	Eighty Years' War	United Provinces; England; German Protestants; Huguenots; France	Spanish Empire; Holy Roman Empire
1569	1573	First Desmond Rebellion	Kingdom of England; Kingdom of Ireland allied Irish clans	FitzGeralds of Desmond allied Irish clans
1569	1570	Rising of the North	(Kingdom of England) Elizabeth I of England (Kingdom of England) English and Welsh Protestants (Kingdom of Scotland) Scottish Protestants	(Kingdom of England) Partisans of Mary, Queen of Scots (Kingdom of England) English and Welsh Catholics
1570	1574	War of the League of the Indies	Portuguese Empire	Sultanate of Bijapur; Ahmadnagar Sultanate Zamorin of Calicut; Aceh Sultanate
1570	1573	Ottoman–Venetian War (1570–1573)	Ottoman Empire	Holy League: Republic of Venice; Spain; Papal States; Kingdom of Naples; Republic of Genoa; Kingdom of Sicily; Grand Duchy of Tuscany; Duchy of Urbino; Duchy of Savoy (Sovereign Military Order of Malta) Knights of Malta
1570	1580	Ishiyama Hongan-ji War	Oda clan	Ikkō-ikki; Saika Ikki Ashikaga Yoshiaki (after 1573); Mōri clan Iga–Kōka alliance (1573)
1570	1570		Oda clan	Rokkaku clan Iga–Kōka alliance
1571	1571	Russo-Crimean War (1571)	Crimean Khanate	Tsardom of Russia
1572	1576	Mughal invasion of Bengal	Mughal Empire	Bengal Sultanate
1573	1573	Croatian–Slovene Peasant Revolt	Holy Roman Empire	Croatian peasants Slovene peasants
1572	1573	Revolt of Ashikaga Yoshiaki	Oda clan	Ashikaga Yoshiaki Rokkaku clan Iga–Kōka alliance
1575	1577	Danzig rebellion	Polish–Lithuanian Commonwealth; Principality of Transylvania	Danzig
1578	1578	Castilian War	Bruneian Empire	Spanish Empire
1578	1578	Battle of Alcácer Quibir (also known as "Battle of Three Kings" or "The Battle of Alcazar")	(Morocco) Marinid Sultanate	Kingdom of Portugal Thomas Stukley; Abu Abdallah Mohammed II Saadi
1578	1590	Ottoman–Safavid War (1578–1590)	Ottoman Empire	Safavid Empire; Kingdom of Kartli
1579	1581	Tenshō Iga War	Oda clan	Iga ikki
1579	1583	Second Desmond Rebellion	Kingdom of England; Kingdom of Ireland allied Irish clans	FitzGeralds of Desmond; Spain; Papal States allied Irish clans
1580	1583	War of the Portuguese Succession	Spanish Empire (Kingdom of Portugal) Portugal loyal to Philip	(Kingdom of Portugal) Portugal loyal to António, Prior of Crato; France; England; United Provinces
1581	1585	Conquest of the Khanate of Sibir	Tsardom of Russia	Khanate of Sibir
1582	1582	Honnō-ji Incident	Oda forces under Akechi Mitsuhide's command	Oda Nobunaga, Oda Nobutada and their servants
1583	1588	Cologne War	Ernest of Bavaria Prince-Elector, Cologne, 1583–1612; House of Wittelsbach; Free Imperial City of Cologne; Philip of Spain, and for him: House of Farnese; House of Isenburg-Grenzau; House of Mansfeld (main line); House of Berlaymont-Flyon and others	Gebhard, Truchsess von Waldburg, Prince-Elector, Cologne 1578–1588; House of Neuenahr-Alpen; House of Waldburg; House of Palatinate-Zweibrücken House of Nassau; House of Solms-Braunfels and others
1584	1593	Burmese–Siamese War (1584–1593)	Siam	Burma
1585	1604	Anglo-Spanish War (1585–1604)	Spanish Empire	Kingdom of England; United Provinces (Portugal) Portuguese loyal to Prior of Crato
1585	1589	Mughal conquest of Kashmir	Mughal Empire	Kashmir Sultanate
1586	1589	Ottoman–Portuguese conflicts (1586–1589)	(Kingdom of Portugal) Portuguese Empire	Ottoman Empire; Ajuran Sultanate
1587	1588	War of the Polish Succession (1587–88)	Faction of Sigismund III Vasa	Faction of Maximilian III
1589	1589	Beylerbeyi event	Ottoman Empire	Janissaries
1590	1595	Russo-Swedish War (1590–1595)	Tsardom of Russia	Sweden
1591	1591	Portuguese invasion of Jaffna kingdom (1591)	Portuguese Empire	Jaffna Kingdom
1591	1593	Kosiński uprising	Polish–Lithuanian Commonwealth	Cossacks
1591	1594	Rappenkrieg (Basel)	Prince-Bishopric of Basel	Swiss peasants
1591	1594	Siamese–Cambodian War (1591–1594)	Kingdom of Ayutthaya	Kingdom of Cambodia
1591	1606	Long Turkish War	Archduchy of Austria; Holy Roman Empire; Habsburg Kingdom of Hungary; Kingdom of Croatia; Kingdom of Bohemia; Principality of Transylvania; Wallachia; Moldavia; Zaporozhian Host; Spain; Serbian hajduks Papal States; Venice; Saxony; Tuscany; Persia; Knights of St. Stephen; Bulgarian rebels Duchy of Ferrara; Duchy of Mantua; Duchy of Savoy	Ottoman Empire; Crimean Khanate; Nogai Khanate
1592	1598	Japanese invasions of Korea	Ming dynasty Joseon dynasty	Toyotomi Japan
1592	1604	Strasbourg Bishops' War	Duchy of Württemberg; House of Ascania; Margraviate of Brandenburg	House of Lorraine
1593	1597	Cambodian–Spanish War	Cambodia	Spanish Empire
1593	1617	Moldavian Magnate Wars		
1594	1596	Nalyvaiko Uprising	Polish–Lithuanian Commonwealth	Cossacks
1594	1605	Burmese–Siamese War (1593–1600)	Ayutthaya Kingdom	Toungoo dynasty
1594	1603	Nine Years' War (Ireland)	Kingdom of England and its government in Ireland	Alliance of Irish clans Supported by: (Spain) Spain; Scottish Gaelic mercenaries
1596	1596	Himara Revolt	Ottoman Empire	Himariote rebels
1598	1663	Dutch–Portuguese War	Portugal	Dutch Republic: Dutch West India Company; Dutch East India Company

== 1600–1699 ==
Start	Finish	Name of conflict	Belligerents	
Start	Finish	Name of conflict	Victorious party (if applicable)	Defeated party (if applicable)
1600	1600	Battle of Sekigahara	Eastern Army: forces loyal to Tokugawa Ieyasu	Western Army: forces loyal to Ishida Mitsunari
1600	1601	Thessaly rebellion (1600)	Ottoman Empire	Greek peasants
1600	1601	Franco-Savoyard War (1600–1601)	Kingdom of France	Duchy of Savoy
1600	1866	Navajo Wars	Crown of Castile; Spain; Mexico; United States	Navajo
1600	1611	Polish–Swedish War (1600–1611)	Polish–Lithuanian Commonwealth	Sweden
1601	1607	Acaxee Rebellion	Spain	Acaxee; Tepehuanos; Xiximes
1602	1663	Dutch–Portuguese War	Kingdom of Portugal; Supported by: Crown of Castile (until 1640); Kingdom of Cochin; Potiguara Tupis	Dutch Republic; Supported by: Kingdom of England (until 1640); Johor Sultanate (Dominion of Ceylon) Kingdom of Kandy; Kingdom of Kongo; Kingdom of Ndongo-Matamba; Rio Grande Tupis; Nhandui Tarairiu Tribe
1603	1618	Ottoman–Safavid War (1603–1618)	Safavid Empire	Ottoman Empire
1604	1606	Bocskai uprising	Holy Roman Empire: Crown of Bohemia; Austria; Royalists; Kingdom of Croatia; Spanish Empire; Zaporozhian Host; Serbs; Walloon, Italian, German mercenaries	Hajduk rebels of Stephen Bocskai and Hungarian supporters and minorities (mostly Slovaks and Rusyns); Transylvania; Moldavia; Ottoman Empire; Crimean Khanate
1606	1607	Bolotnikov rebellion	Tsardom of Russia	Russian peasants
1606	1608	Zebrzydowski rebellion	Polish–Lithuanian Commonwealth	Polish Nobility
1609	1621	Dutch conquest of the Banda Islands	Dutch East India Company; Supported by: Japanese mercenaries	Bandanese fighters Supported by: East India Company
1609	1614	War of the Jülich Succession	Supporting Wolfgang William: Spain; Palatinate-Neuburg; Catholic League Supporting John Sigismund: Margraviate of Brandenburg; Dutch Republic; England; Protestant Union	Supporting Emperor Rudolph: Holy Roman Empire; Principality of Strasbourg; Prince-Bishopric of Liège
1609	1618	Polish–Russian War (1609–1618)	Polish–Lithuanian Commonwealth	Tsardom of Russia
1609	1701	Beaver Wars	Iroquois England Supported by: Dutch Republic	Algonquian Huron Susquehannock Erie Neutral Petun Odawa Ojibwe Wenro Mahican Innu Abenaki; France
1609	1609	Invasion of Ryukyu	Satsuma Domain	Ryūkyū Kingdom
1610	1614	First Anglo-Powhatan War	Kingdom of England	Powhatan Confederacy
1610	1617	Ingrian War	Sweden	Tsardom of Russia
1611	1611	Epirus revolt of 1611	Ottoman Empire	Greek peasants
1611	1611	Conquest of Bakla	Mughal Empire	Chandradwip Kingdom; Portuguese and Dutch allies
1612	1613	Kalmar War	Denmark–Norway	Sweden
1612	1614	Rappenkrieg	Holy Roman Empire	Peasants
1612	1615	Equinoctial France War	Kingdom of Portugal; Brazilian colonists	France
1613	1614	Burmese–Siamese War (1609–1622)	Toungoo dynasty	Ayutthaya Kingdom
1614	1615	Siege of Osaka	Tokugawa shogunate	Toyotomi clan
1614	1625	Mataram conquest of Surabaya	Mataram Sultanate	Duchy of Surabaya
1615	1618	Uskok War	Republic of Venice; Dutch Republic; Kingdom of England	Holy Roman Empire; Kingdom of Croatia; Habsburg Spain
1615	1682	Ahom–Mughal conflicts	Kingdom of Ahom	Mughal Empire
1616	1620	Tepehuán Revolt	Spanish Empire	Tepehuánes; Irritillas; Acaxee; Xiximes; Humes
1617	1618	Polish–Swedish War (1617–1618)	Sweden	Polish–Lithuanian Commonwealth
1618	1697	Spanish conquest of Petén; Part of the Spanish conquest of Guatemala and the Spanish conquest of Yucatán	Spanish Empire	Independent Maya
1618	1639	Bündner Wirren	France; Republic of Venice	Holy Roman Empire
1618	1648	Thirty Years' War	Protestant States and Allies Denmark-Norway (1625–1629); France (from 1635); Bohemia (1618–1620); Sweden; Saxony; Dutch Republic; Electorate of the Palatinate; Brunswick-Lüneburg; England (1625–30); Brandenburg-Prussia; Transylvania; Hungarian Anti-Habsburg Rebels; Zaporozhian Cossacks; Ottoman Empire	Roman Catholic States and Allies Holy Roman Empire: Catholic League; Austria; Bohemia (after 1620); Kingdom of Hungary; Kingdom of Croatia (Spanish Empire) Spain and its possessions Denmark-Norway (1643–1645)
1618	1683	Qing conquest of the Ming	Later Jin (until 1636); Qing dynasty (from 1636)	Ming dynasty (until 1644); Southern Ming (1644–1662); Kingdom of Tungning(from 1661) Shun dynasty (1644–1645) Daxi dynasty (1644–1646)
1619	1682	Ahom–Mughal conflicts	Ahom kingdom	Mughal Empire
1620	1621	Polish–Ottoman War (1620–1621)	Poland-Lithuania	Ottoman Empire
1621	1621	Dutch conquest of the Banda Islands	Dutch East India Company	Banda natives
1621	1625	Polish–Swedish War (1621–1625)	Sweden	Polish–Lithuanian Commonwealth
1621	1635	Mughal–Sikh War (1621–35)	Sikh militia	Mughal Empire
1622	1623	Mughal–Safavid War (1622–1623)	Safavid Empire	Mughal Empire
1622	1625	War of the Vicuñas and Basques	Basques	Vicuñas
1622	1632	Second Anglo-Powhatan War	England	Powhatan Confederacy
1623	1639	Ottoman–Safavid War (1623–1639)	Ottoman Empire	Safavid Empire
1625	1630	Anglo-Spanish War (1625–1630)	Spain	England Support: Dutch Republic
1625	1625	Zhmaylo uprising	Polish–Lithuanian Commonwealth	Cossacks
1625	1625	Relief of Genoa	Spain; Republic of Genoa	Kingdom of France; Duchy of Savoy; Dutch Republic
1626	1629	Polish–Swedish War (1626–1629)	Sweden	Polish–Lithuanian Commonwealth; Holy Roman Empire
1626	1626	Peasants' War in Upper Austria	Electorate of Bavaria; Upper Austria	Peasant rebels
1627	1627	Later Jin invasion of Joseon	Joseon dynasty	Later Jin
1627	1672	Trịnh–Nguyễn War	Trịnh lords Lê dynasty Dutch East India Company	Nguyễn lords
1628	1631	War of the Mantuan Succession; Part of the Thirty Years' War	Supporting the Duke of Nevers: France	Supporting the Duke of Guastalla: Holy Roman Empire; Spain; Duchy of Savoy
1630	1630	Fedorovych uprising	Polish–Lithuanian Commonwealth	Cossacks
c. 1630	c. 1630	Yemeni Expedition of the 1630s Part of the Yemeni–Ottoman Conflicts	Ottoman Empire	Zaidis
1632	1634	Smolensk War	Polish–Lithuanian Commonwealth	Tsardom of Russia
1633	1634	Polish–Ottoman War (1633–1634)	Polish–Lithuanian Commonwealth	Ottoman Empire
1634	1741	Kazakh-Dzungar Wars	Kazakh Khanate (Inconclusive)	Dzungar Khanate (Inconclusive)
1634	1638	Pequot War	Massachusetts Bay Colony; Plymouth Colony; Saybrook Colony: Narragansett people; Mohegan people	Pequot
1635	1635	Sulyma uprising	Polish–Lithuanian Commonwealth	Cossacks
1635	1654	Acadian Civil War	Port Royal Administration	St. John Administration; Massachusetts Bay Colony
1635	1659	Franco-Spanish War (1635–1659)	France; Commonwealth of England (from 1657)	Spain; Royalists of the British Isles (from 1657)
1636	1637	Qing invasion of Joseon	Qing dynasty	Joseon dynasty
1637	1637	Pavlyuk uprising	Polish–Lithuanian Commonwealth	Cossacks
1637	1638	Shimabara Rebellion	Tokugawa shogunate (Dutch Republic) Dutch Empire	Roman Catholics and rōnin rebels
1638	1638	Ostryanyn uprising	Polish–Lithuanian Commonwealth	Cossacks
1639	1639	Revolt of the va-nu-pieds	France	Tax Resisters
1639	1639	First Bishops' War; Part of the Wars of the Three Kingdoms	Scottish Covenanters	Scottish Royalists; England
1639	1659	Mataram–Blambangan wars	Mataram Sultanate	Blambangan Kingdom Kingdom of Gelgel
1640	1640	Second Bishops' War; Part of the Wars of the Three Kingdoms	Scottish Covenanters	Scottish Royalists; England
1640	1659	Reapers' War	Spain	(Catalonia) Catalan Republic; France
1640	1668	Portuguese Restoration War	Kingdom of Portugal; Supported by: Kingdom of England (after 1661)	Spain
1641	1653	Irish Confederate Wars; Part of the Wars of the Three Kingdoms	(Commonwealth of England) Parliamentarians	Irish Catholic Confederation (allied with Royalists 1648–1650) English and Scottish Royalists (allied with Irish Confederates 1648–1650)
1641	1644	First War of Castro	Barberini Pope Urban VIII and Pamphili; Pope Innocent X their papal armies and relatives.	The Farnese Dukes of Parma
1642	1646	First English Civil War; Part of the Wars of the Three Kingdoms	(Kingdom of England) (Kingdom of Scotland) Parliaments of England and Scotland	English and Scottish Royalists
1642	1698	Dano-Mughal War	Danish India	Mughal Empire
1643	1644	Cambodian–Dutch War	Cambodia	Dutch East India Company
1643	1645	Torstenson War; Part of the Thirty Years' War	Sweden; Dutch Republic	Denmark-Norway; Holy Roman Empire
1643	1645	Kieft's War	Lenape	(Dutch Republic) New Netherland
1644	1646	Third Anglo-Powhatan War	England	Powhatan Confederacy
1644	1674	Char Bouba war	Maqil Arab tribes	Sanhadja Berber tribes
1644	1651	Scotland in the Wars of the Three Kingdoms; Part of the Wars of the Three Kingdoms	Scottish Covenanters	Scottish Royalists; Irish Catholic Confederate
1645	1669	Cretan War (1645–1669)	Ottoman Empire; Barbary States	Republic of Venice (Sovereign Military Order of Malta) Knights of Malta; Papal States; France; Maniots
1646	1647	Mughal invasion of Central Asia	Khanate of Bukhara	Mughal Empire
1648	1648	Atmeydanı incident	Ottoman Empire	Sipahi Corps
1648	1648	Moscow uprising of 1648	Tsardom of Russia	Rioters
1648	1657	Khmelnytsky Uprising	Zaporozhian Cossacks; Crimean Tatars (1649–1654, 1656–1657)	Polish–Lithuanian Commonwealth; Crimean Tatars (1654–1656)
1648	1649	First Fronde	Kingdom of France	Parlements (1648–1649); Princes of the Blood (1650–1653)
1648	1649	Second English Civil War; Part of the Wars of the Three Kingdoms	(Kingdom of England) Parliamentary forces	Royalist forces Scotland
1649	1651	Third English Civil War; Part of the Wars of the Three Kingdoms	(Commonwealth of England) Parliamentarians	Royalists; Scottish Covenanters
1649	1653	Mughal–Safavid War	Mughal Empire	Safavid Empire
1649	1653	Cromwellian conquest of Ireland; Part of the Wars of the Three Kingdoms	English Parliamentarian New Model Army, Protestant colonists	Irish Catholic Confederation, English Royalists
1649	1649	Second War of Castro	Pope Innocent X and his papal army.	Ranuccio II Farnese, Duke of Parma
1650	1653	Second Fronde	Kingdom of France	Parlements (1648–1649); Princes of the Blood (1650–1653)
1651	1651	Düsseldorf Cow War	Margraviate of Brandenburg	Palatinate-Neuburg
1651	1651	Kostka-Napierski uprising	Polish–Lithuanian Commonwealth	Polish peasants
1651	1651	Keian Uprising	Tokugawa Shogunate	Ronin
1651	1653	Russo-Persian War (1651–1653)	Safavid dynasty	Russian Empire
1651	1986	Three Hundred and Thirty Five Years' War	Isles of Scilly	(Dutch Republic) Republic of the Seven United Netherlands
1652	1652	Guo Huaiyi rebellion	Dutch East India Company; Aboriginal Taiwanese	Peasant rebels
1652	1654	First Anglo-Dutch War	Commonwealth of England	Dutch Republic
1652	1689	Russian–Manchu border conflicts	Qing dynasty Joseon dynasty	Tsardom of Russia; Cossacks
1653	1653	Swiss peasant war of 1653	City governments' troops Zürich; Thurgau; Uri	Peasant forces from: Lucerne; Bern; Solothurn; Basel; Aargau
1653	1653	Morning Star rebellion	Sweden	Swedish Peasants
1654	1654	First Swedish War on Bremen	Sweden	Bremen
1654	1667	Russo-Polish War (1654–1667)	Tsardom of Russia; Ukrainian Cossacks	Polish–Lithuanian Commonwealth; Crimean Khanate
1654	1660	Anglo-Spanish War (1654–1660)	Commonwealth of England; France (1657–59)	(Spanish Empire) Habsburg Spain; Cavalier
1655	1655	Peach War	Lenape and allied tribes	(Dutch Republic) New Netherland
1655	1656	Varaždin rebellion (1665–1666)	Habsburg monarchy	Frontiersmen
1655	1660	Second Northern War	Sweden; Brandenburg-Prussia (1656–57); Principality of Transylvania; Ukrainian Cossacks (1657); Grand Duchy of Lithuania Wallachia; Moldavia	Poland–Lithuania; Denmark–Norway; Holy Roman Empire; Tsardom of Russia (1656–58); Crimean Khanate; Brandenburg-Prussia (1655–56, 1657–60); Dutch Republic
1655	1690	Savoyard–Waldensian wars	Duchy of Savoy	Waldensians
1656	1656	Çınar incident	Rebellious soldiers	Ottoman Empire
1656	1658	Russo-Swedish War (1656–1658); Part of the Second Northern War	Sweden	Tsardom of Russia
1657	1658	Dano-Swedish War (1657–1658); Part of the Second Northern War	Sweden	Denmark–Norway
1658	1660	Dano-Swedish War (1658–1660); Part of the Second Northern War	Denmark–Norway; Dutch Republic; Brandenburg-Prussia; Polish–Lithuanian Commonwealth	Sweden
1658	1667	Druze power struggle (1658–1667)	Ottoman Empire	Ma'ani Druze Rebels
1659	1659	Kakhetian Uprising (1659)	Kingdom of Kakheti	Safavid Empire
1660	1673	Brunei Civil War	Sultan Abdul Hakkul Mubin's Forces	Sultan Muhyiddin's Forces
1661	1662	Siege of Fort Zeelandia	Koxinga's Ming Loyalists	Dutch East India Company
1661	1665	Dano-Dutch colonial conflict on the Gold Coast	Denmark-Norway; England	Dutch Republic
1662	1662	Copper Riot	Tsardom of Russia	Rioters
1662	1664	Bashkir rebellion (1662–1664)	Tsardom of Russia	Bashkir rebels
1662	1664	Burmese–Siamese War (1662–1664)	Burma	Siam
1663	1664	Austro-Turkish War (1663–1664)	Ottoman Empire	League of the Rhine
1665	1666	Lubomirski's rebellion	Polish–Lithuanian Commonwealth	Polish Nobility
1665	1667	Second Anglo-Dutch War	Dutch Republic; Denmark–Norway; France	England
1665	1709	Kongo Civil War	House of Kinlaza	House of Kimpanzu
1666	1666	Second Swedish War on Bremen	Sweden	Bremen; Electorate of Cologne; Brunswick-Lüneburg (Celle); Denmark–Norway; Electorate of Brandenburg; Dutch Republic
1666	1671	Polish–Cossack–Tatar War (1666–1671)	Polish–Lithuanian Commonwealth	Crimean Khanate; Zaporozhian Cossacks; Ottoman Empire
1667	1668	War of Devolution	France	Spanish Empire; Triple Alliance: Dutch Republic; Kingdom of England; Sweden
1667 (or 1670)	1671	Stepan Razin rebellion	Tsardom of Russia	Russian peasants
1667	1675	Angelets	France	Tax Resisters
1668	1676	Solovetsky Monastery uprising	Tsardom of Russia	Old Believers
1669	1672	Shakushain's revolt	Tokugawa shogunate	Ainu Rebels
1672	1673	Second Genoese–Savoyard War	Republic of Genoa (Spanish Empire) Spain	Duchy of Savoy
1672	1676	Polish–Ottoman War (1672–1676)	Ottoman Empire; Crimean Khanate; Principality of Moldavia; Cossack Hetmanate (Doroshenko's faction)	Polish–Lithuanian Commonwealth; Principality of Wallachia (in 1673)
1672	1678	Franco-Dutch War	France; England; Sweden; Bishopric of Münster; Archbishopric of Cologne	Dutch Republic; Holy Roman Empire (Spanish Empire) Spain; Electorate of Brandenburg; England
1672	1674	Third Anglo-Dutch War; Part of the Franco-Dutch War	Dutch Republic; Denmark-Norway	England; France
1673	1681	Revolt of the Three Feudatories	Qing dynasty	Three Feudatories; Kingdom of Tungning
1674	1681	Trunajaya rebellion	Mataram Sultanate; Dutch East India Company	Rebel forces Makassarese itinerant fighters
1675	1675	Revolt of the papier timbré	France	Tax Resisters
1675	1679	Scanian War; Part of the Franco-Dutch War	Sweden; France	Denmark-Norway; Dutch Republic; Brandenburg; Holy Roman Empire
1675	1678	King Philip's War	New England Confederation; Mohegan; Pequots	Wampanoag; Nipmuc; Podunk; Narragansett; Nashaway
1675	1705	Revolutions of Tunis	Husainid dynasty	Muradid dynasty
1676	1681	Russo-Turkish War (1676–1681)	Tsardom of Russia; Cossack Hetmanate of Ivan Samoylovych	Ottoman Empire; Crimean Khanate; Cossack Hetmanate of Petro Doroshenko
1678	1680	Dzungar conquest of Altishahr	Dzungar Khanate; Afāqi Naqshbandi Sufi Khojas; Turfan Khanate; Kumul Khanate	Chagatai Khanate (Yarkent Khanate); Isḥāqi Naqshbandi Sufi Khojas
1678	1685	Thököly Uprising	Habsburg monarchy: Kingdom of Hungary	Principality of Upper Hungary
1679	1707	Rajput War (1679–1707)	Kingdom of Marwar	Mughal Empire
1679	1684	Tibet–Ladakh–Mughal War	Tibet	Ladakh | Mughal Empire
1680	1680	Pueblo Revolt	Spanish Empire	Puebloans
1680	1707	Mughal–Maratha Wars	Maratha Empire	Mughal Empire
1682	1713	War of the Barbarians	Portuguese Empire	Cariri Confederation
1683	1699	Great Turkish War	Holy Roman Empire; Tsardom of Russia; Cossack Hetmanate; Poland–Lithuania; Republic of Venice; Habsburg Hungary; Kingdom of Croatia; (Spanish Empire) Spain; Serbian rebels; Albanian rebels; Greek rebels; Bulgarian rebels; Macedonian rebels	Ottoman Empire; Crimean Khanate
1683	1699	Polish–Ottoman War (1683–1699); Part of the Great Turkish War	Polish–Lithuanian Commonwealth; Allied Holy League forces	Ottoman Empire
1683	1684	War of the Reunions	France	Spanish Empire; Holy Roman Empire; Republic of Genoa
1684	1699	Morean War; Part of the Great Turkish War	Republic of Venice (Sovereign Military Order of Malta) Knights of Malta; Duchy of Savoy; Papal States; Knights of St. Stephen; Himariotes; Maniots; Other Greek rebels	Ottoman Empire
1685	1685	Monmouth Rebellion	Kingdom of England	Duke of Monmouth
1686	1686	Second Tarnovo Uprising	Ottoman Empire	Bulgarian rebels
1686	1690	Child's War	Mughal Empire	English East India Company
1686	1700	Russo-Turkish War (1686–1700)	Russia; Habsburg Monarchy; Polish–Lithuanian Commonwealth; Cossack Hetmanate	Ottoman Empire; Crimean Khanate
1687	1687	Siamese–English War	Kingdom of England	Siam
1687	1689	Revolt of the Barretinas	Spanish Empire	Catalan Rebels
1687	1689	Crimean campaigns	Crimean Khanate; Ottoman Empire	Tsardom of Russia
1687	1758	Dzungar–Qing Wars	Qing dynasty	Dzungar Khanate
1688	1688	Chiprovtsi uprising	Ottoman Empire	Christian rebels
1688	1697	Nine Years' War	Grand Alliance: Dutch Republic; England; Holy Roman Empire (Spanish Empire) Spain; Piedmont-Savoy; Sweden (until 1691); Scotland	France
1689	1689	Karposh's rebellion	Ottoman Empire	Macedonian rebels
1689	1697	King William's War; Part of the Nine Years' War	France; New France; Wabanaki Confederacy	England (Kingdom of England) English America; Iroquois Confederacy
1689	1691	Williamite War in Ireland; Part of the Nine Years' War	Williamites: England; Scotland; Dutch Republic; Protestant colonists and mercenaries from various countries	Irish Jacobites; France
1689	1692	Scottish Jacobite rising	Scotland	Scottish Jacobite
1693	1693	Second Brotherhood	Spanish Empire	Agermanats
1694	1700	Komenda Wars	Dutch West India Company	Royal African Company
1695	1696	Azov campaigns	Tsardom of Russia	Ottoman Empire
1698	1698	Streltsy uprising	Tsardom of Russia	Streltsy
1699	1699	Arena Massacre	Spanish Empire	Amerindians
1699	1700	Darien scheme	Spanish Empire	Scotland
1699	1702	Maghrebi war (1699-1702)	Deylik of Algiers	Beylik of Tunis; Sultanate of Morocco; Pashalik of Tripoli

== 1700–1799 ==
Start	Finish	Name of Conflict	Belligerents	
Start	Finish	Name of Conflict	Victorious party (if applicable)	Defeated party (if applicable)
1700	1721	Great Northern War	(Russian Empire) Tsardom of Russia: Kalmyk Khanate; Cossack Hetmanate; Denmark–Norway (1700, 1709–20); Electorate of Saxony (1700–06, 1709–); Poland–Lithuania (1700–04, 1709–) Kingdom of Prussia (1715–20); Electorate of Hanover (1715–19); Great Britain (1717–19)	(Sweden) Swedish Empire: Holstein-Gottorp; Poland–Lithuania (1704–09); Ottoman Empire (1710–14); Cossack Hetmanate (1708–09); England (1700); Great Britain (1719–21); Dutch Republic (1700); Duchy of Brunswick-Lüneburg (1700)
1701	1701	Battle of Dartsedo	Qing dynasty	Khoshut Khanate
1701	1714	War of the Spanish Succession	Kingdom of France; Spain loyal to Philip; Bavaria (until 1704)	Holy Roman Empire: Austria; Prussia; Hanover; England (until 1707); Great Britain (from 1707); Dutch Republic; Duchy of Savoy; Kingdom of Portugal; Spain loyal to Charles
1702	1713	Queen Anne's War; Part of the War of the Spanish Succession	England (before 1707): (Kingdom of England) English America; Great Britain (after 1707): British America; Muscogee (Creek) Chickasaw; Yamasee	France: New France; Spain: New Spain; Wabanaki Confederacy; Caughnawaga Mohawk; Choctaw; Timucua; Apalachee; Natchez
1702	1715	Camisard Rebellion	France	Huguenot Rebels
1703	1704	Ottoman invasion of western Georgia (1703)	Ottoman Empire	Kingdom of Imereti; Principality of Guria; Principality of Mingrelia
1703	1705	Naqib al-Ashraf revolt	Ottoman Empire	Janissaries
1703	1711	Rákóczi's War of Independence	Austria	(Transylvania) Kurucs (Kingdom of Hungary); Kingdom of France
1704	1704	Kuridža's Rebellion	Republic of Venice	Orthodox peasants
1704	1706	Civil war in Poland (1704–1706) Part of the Great North War	Warsaw Confederation	Sandomierz Confederation
1704	1708	First Javanese War of Succession	Dutch East India Company	Mataram Sultanate
1704	1711	Bashkir Uprising (1704–1711)	Russia	Bashkir rebels
1705	1706	Bavarian People's Uprising	Austria	(Electorate of Bavaria) Bavarian peasants
1707	1707	Mughal war of succession (1707)	Faction of Bahadur Shah I	Faction of Muhammad Azam Shah; Faction of Muhammad Kam Bakhsh
1707	1708	Bulavin Rebellion	Russia	Peasants
1707	1709	War of the Emboabas	Kingdom of Portugal; Portuguese settlers Early Brazilian settlers	Bandeirantes Paulistas
1708	1708	Kanzhal War (1708)	Kabardia	Crimean Khanate; Ottoman Empire
1708	1709	Comacchio War	Austria	Papal States
1709	1722	Hotaki–Safavid War	Hotak dynasty	Safavid dynasty
1710	1711	Pruth River Campaign	Ottoman Empire: Crimean Khanate; Wallachia; (Sweden) Swedish Empire; Cossack Hetmanate (fraction of Pylyp Orlyk); Zaporizhian Sich	(Russian Empire) Tsardom of Russia Cossack Hetmanate (fraction of Ivan Skoropadsky); Moldavia
1711	1711	Cary's Rebellion	(Kingdom of Great Britain) Province of Carolina	Party of Edward Hyde
1711	1711	1711 Karamanli coup	Party of Ahmed Karamanli	Ottoman Tripolitania
1711	1711	Battle of Ain Dara	Shihab dynasty Jumblatt clan of Chouf; Talhuq clan of Gharb; Nakad clan of Manasif; Imad clan of Arqub Abd al-Malik clan of Jurd; Abu'l Lama clan of Matn; Khazen clan of Keserwan	Alam al-Din clan Arslan clan of Gharb; Sawaf clan of Matn
1711	1715	Tuscarora War	(Kingdom of Great Britain) Colonial militia of North Carolina (Kingdom of Great Britain) Colonial militia of South Carolina; Yamasee; Northern Tuscarora; Apalachee; Catawba; Cherokee	Southern Tuscarora; Pamplico; Cothechney; Coree; Mattamuskeet; Matchepungo
1712	1712	1712 Huilliche rebellion	(Spain) Spanish Empire	Huilliches
1712	1712	New York Slave Revolt of 1712	Kingdom of Great Britain	Slaves
1712	1712	Toggenburg War	Canton of Zürich; Canton of Bern Toggenburg rebels City of Geneva; Principality of Neuchâtel	Abbey of Saint Gall; Canton of Lucerne Canton of Uri; Canton of Schwyz; Canton of Unterwalden; Canton of Zug; Valais; Freie Ämter
1712	1716	First Fox War	France	Fox people
1713	1714	War of the Catalans; Part of the War of the Spanish Succession	Spain; France	Principality of Catalonia
1714	1718	Ottoman–Venetian War (1714–18)	Ottoman Empire	Republic of Venice; Austria; Portugal; Order of Malta; Papal States; Spain; Himariotes
1715	1717	Yamasee War	(Kingdom of Great Britain) Colonial militia of South Carolina (Kingdom of Great Britain) Colonial militia of North Carolina (Kingdom of Great Britain) Colonial militia of Virginia; Catawba (from 1715); Cherokee (from 1716)	Yamasee; Ochese Creeks; Catawba (until 1715); Cherokee (until 1716); Waxhaw; Santee
1715	1716	Jacobite rising of 1715; Also called "The Fifteen"	(Kingdom of Great Britain) British Government forces	Scottish and English Jacobite Rebels
1717	1717	1717 Omani invasion of Bahrain	Sultanate of Muscat	Safavids Bahrain
1718	1720	War of the Quadruple Alliance	Great Britain; France; Austria; Dutch Republic; Savoy	Spain Jacobites
1719	1723	Second Javanese War of Succession	Mataram Sultanate Dutch East India Company	Rival claimants to Mataram throne; Rebel Princes
1720	1720	Chinese expedition to Tibet (1720)	Qing dynasty	Dzungar Khanate
1721	1721	Attingal Outbreak	British East India Company	Indian Rebels
1721	1735	Revolt of the Comuneros (Paraguay)	(Spain) Spanish Empire	Anti-Jesuits
1721	1763	Chickasaw Wars	Great Britain; Chickasaw	France; Choctaw; Illini
1722	1725	Father Rale's War	New England Colonies; Mohawk	Wabanaki Confederacy; Abenaki; Pequawket; Miꞌkmaq; Maliseet
1722	1723	Russo-Persian War (1722–1723)	Russian Empire; Ukrainian Cossacks; Kingdom of Kartli; Kabardians; Kalmyk Khanate; Shamkhalate of Tarki; Tabasaran principality	Safavid dynasty
1722	1727	Ottoman–Hotaki War (1722–1727)	Ottoman Empire	Hotak dynasty
1725	1745	Saltpeter Wars	Müllerisch Faction	Salpterisch Faction
1726	1727	Appeal War	County of East Frisia	Estates of East Frisia
1727	1729	Anglo-Spanish War (1727–1729)	Spain	Great Britain
1728	1733	Second Fox War	France	Fox people
1730	1730	Patrona Halil Revolt	Ottoman Empire	Janissaries
1730	1735	Ottoman–Persian War (1730–1735)	Safavid dynasty	Ottoman Empire
1732	1736	Kovenu war	Anlo	Anexo
1733	1733	1733 slave insurrection on St. John	(Denmark–Norway) Danish West India Company	Slaves
1733	1738	War of the Polish Succession	Poland loyal to Stanisław Leszczyński France; Spain; Piedmont-Sardinia; Duchy of Parma	Poland loyal to Augustus Russia; Austria; Saxony; Prussia
1735	1736	Miao Rebellion (1735–36)	Qing dynasty	Miao rebels
1735	1737	Spanish–Portuguese War (1735–1737)	(Kingdom of Portugal) Portuguese Empire	(Spain) Spanish Empire
1735	1739	Russo–Turkish War (1735–1739)	Russia: Cossack Hetmanate; Austria	Ottoman Empire: Crimean Khanate
1735	1740	Bashkir Rebellion	Russian Empire	Bashkirs
1738	1739	Nader Shah's invasion of India	Afsharid dynasty	Mughal Empire
1739	1739	Stono Rebellion	Kingdom of Great Britain	Slaves
1739	1748	War of Jenkins' Ear; Part of the War of the Austrian Succession	(Spain) Spanish Empire	Kingdom of Great Britain
1740	1748	War of the Austrian Succession	France; Prussia; Spain; Bavaria (1741–45); Saxony (1741–42) (Kingdom of the Two Sicilies) Sicily (Kingdom of the Two Sicilies) Naples; Republic of Genoa; Sweden (1741–43)	Austria; Great Britain; Hanover; Dutch Republic; Saxony (1743–45); Kingdom of Sardinia; Russia (1741–43, 1748)
1740	1742	First Silesian War	(Kingdom of Prussia) Prussia	Austria
1741	1743	Java War (1741–1743)	Dutch East India Company	Javanese rebels
1741	1743	Russo-Swedish War (1741–1743); Part of the War of the Austrian Succession	Russia	Sweden
1742	1742	First Maratha invasion of Bengal	Maratha Empire	Bengal Subah
1743	1746	Ottoman–Persian War (1743–1746)	Afsharid dynasty	Ottoman Empire
1744	1829	Dagohoy rebellion	Spain	Boholano nation
1744	1747	Chukchi War	Russian Empire	Chukchis
1744	1748	King George's War; Part of the War of the Austrian Succession	Great Britain; British America; Iroquois Confederacy	France; New France; Wabanaki Confederacy
1744	1745	Second Silesian War; Part of the War of the Austrian Succession	Prussia	Austria
1745	1746	Jacobite rising of 1745; Also called "The Forty-Five"	Great Britain	Jacobites; Kingdom of France
1746	1748	First Carnatic War; Part of the War of the Austrian Succession	Kingdom of France: French East India Company	Kingdom of Great Britain
1747	1750	Choctaw Civil War	Choctaw Eastern Division	Choctaw Western Division
1747	1796	Civil War between Afsharid and Qajar	Afsharid dynasty	Qajar dynasty
1749	1754	Second Carnatic War	Great Britain British East India Company; Sepoys; Maratha allies	France French East India Company; Nawab of Arcot
1749	1757	Third Javanese War of Succession	Mataram Sultanate (until 1755); Yogyakarta Sultanate (from 1755); Surakarta Sunanate (from 1755); Dutch East India Company	Anti-Dutch rebels
1752	1757	Konbaung–Hanthawaddy War	Burmese Empire	Restored Hanthawaddy Kingdom; French East India Company
1754	1763	French and Indian War; Part of the Seven Years' War	Great Britain; British America Iroquois Confederacy; Wyandot; Catawba; Cherokee (before 1758)); Mingos (briefly)	France; New France Wabanaki Confederacy; Abenaki; Algonquin; Caughnawaga Mohawk Faction; Lenape; Miꞌkmaq; Ojibwa; Odawa; Shawnee
1756	1756	Cattle War	Danish India; French India	Thanjavur
1756	1756	Guaraní War	Portugal; Spain	Guaraní Tribes
1756	1763	Seven Years' War	Great Britain; Hanover; (Kingdom of Prussia) Prussia; (Duchy of Brunswick) Brunswick-Wolfenbüttel; Iroquois Confederacy; Portugal (from 1761); Hesse-Kassel; Schaumburg-Lippe; Wyandot; Catawba; Cherokee (before 1758)	France; Austria; Russia (until 1762); Spain (from 1761); Sweden (1757–62); Saxony; Mughal Empire (from 1757); Wabanaki Confederacy; Caughnawaga Mohawk Faction; Algonquin; Abenaki; Lenape; Ojibwa; Odawa; Shawnee
1756	1763	Third Silesian War; Part of the Seven Years' War	Prussia	Austria
1757	1763	Third Carnatic War; Part of the Seven Years' War	British East India Company	Principality of Bengal; French East India Company; Dutch East India Company
1757	1762	Pomeranian War; Part of the Seven Years' War	Sweden; Russia	Prussia
1757	1759	Revolt of the Altishahr Khojas	Qing dynasty	Altishahr Khojas
1758	1761	Anglo-Cherokee War; Part of the French and Indian War	Great Britain	Cherokee
1759	1760	Burmese–Siamese War (1759–1760)	Burmese Empire	Siam
1760	1760	Tacky's War	Great Britain	Slaves
1761	1761	Canek Revolt	Spain	Mayans
1762	1763	Fantastic War; Part of the Seven Years' War	Portugal; Great Britain	Spain; France
1763	1764	Berbice slave uprising	Dutch Republic	Berbice slaves
1763	1766	Pontiac's War	Great Britain	Pontiac's confederacy Seneca
1763	1864	Russo-Circassian War; Part of the Caucasian War	Russian Empire	Circassia; Caucasian Imamate (Western); Sadzen
1765	1765	Strilekrigen	Denmark–Norway	Norwegian Peasants
1765	1767	Burmese–Siamese War (1765–67)	Burmese Empire	Siam
1765	1769	Sino-Burmese War	Burmese Empire	Qing dynasty
1765	1771	War of the Regulation	Province of North Carolina	Regulators
1766	1792	Mysorean invasion of Kerala	Mysore; Cannanore	British East India Company; Zamorin of Calicut; Travancore
1767	1769	First Anglo-Mysore War	Mysore	British East India Company; Maratha Confederacy; Nawab of Arcot; Hyderabad State
1768	1768	Montserrat slave rebellion of 1768	Great Britain	Slaves
1768	1768	Louisiana Rebellion of 1768	(Spain) Spanish Empire	Creole rebels German rebels
1768	1769	Koliyivshchyna	Russian Empire; Polish–Lithuanian Commonwealth	Haydamak; Cossacks
1768	1769	French conquest of Corsica	France	(Corsica) Corsican Republic
1768	1774	Russo-Turkish War (1768–1774)	Russian Empire: Zaporozhian Host; Greek insurgents Kingdom of Kartli-Kakheti; Kingdom of Imereti	Ottoman Empire: Crimean Khanate
1768	1772	Bar Confederation	Russian Empire	Bar Confederation; Kingdom of France
1769	1773	First Carib War	British Empire	Black Caribs
1769	1772	Danish-Algerian War	Ottoman Algeria	Denmark-Norway
1769	1788	Twenty Years' War	Bruneian Sultanate	Sultanate of Sulu The Philippines Co-belligerents Kingdom of Spain Captaincy General of the Philippines
1769	1806	Moamoria rebellion	Kingdom of Ahom	Morans
1771	1771	Moscow plague riot of 1771	Russian Empire	Rioters
1771	1785	Tây Sơn–Nguyễn War (1771–1785)	Tây Sơn dynasty	Nguyen lords
1771	1802	Fakir-Sannyasi rebellion	Company Raj	Fakirs; Sannyasis
1773	1775	Pugachev's Rebellion	Russian Empire	Cossack and peasant rebels Tatar and Bashkir nobles
1774	1774	Lord Dunmore's War	Colony of Virginia	Shawnees; Mingos
1775	1775	Rising of the Priests	(Sovereign Military Order of Malta) Order of Saint John	Clergy
1775	1776	Burmese–Siamese War (1775–1776)	Siam	Burma
1775	1782	First Anglo-Maratha War	British East India Company	Maratha Empire
1775	1783	American Revolutionary War	United States; France (1778–83); Spain (1779–83); Dutch Republic (1780–83) Co-belligerents; Vermont (1777–83); Oneida; Tuscarora; Watauga Association; Catawba; Lenape	Great Britain: Loyalists; German auxiliaries; Co-belligerents; Iroquois Confederacy: Onondaga; Mohawk; Cayuga; Seneca; Cherokee
1776	1777	Spanish–Portuguese War (1776–1777)	(Spain) Spanish Empire	(Kingdom of Portugal) Portuguese Empire
1776	1794	Chickamauga Wars (1776–1794)	United States	Cherokee
1778	1779	War of the Bavarian Succession	Austria	Kingdom of Prussia; Electorate of Saxony
1778	1783	Anglo-French War (1778–1783)	France	Great Britain
1779	1783	Anglo-Spanish War; Part of the American Revolutionary War	Spain	Great Britain
1779	1781	First Xhosa War	Dutch Cape Colony	Xhosa tribesmen
1780	1784	Fourth Anglo-Dutch War; Part of the American Revolutionary War	Great Britain	Dutch Republic; France
1780	1784	Second Anglo-Mysore War	Mysore; France; Dutch Republic	British East India Company; Great Britain; Hanover
1780	1783	Rebellion of Túpac Amaru II	(Spain) Spanish Empire: (Spain) Viceroyalty of Peru; (Spain) Viceroyalty of the Río de la Plata	Aymara-Quechua rebels
1781	1781	Jahriyya revolt	Qing dynasty Khafiya Sufi Muslims	Jahriyya Sufi Muslims
1781	1781	Revolt of the Comuneros (New Granada)	(Spain) Viceroyalty of New Granada	Comuneros
1782	1782	1782 Sylhet uprising	British East India Company	Bengali Muslims
1782	1810	Unification of Hawaii	Kingdom of Hawai'i	Kingdom of Maui; Kingdom of Kauai; Kingdom of O'ahu
1783	1783	1782–83 unrest in Bahrain	Sheikhdom of Zubarah	Zand dynasty
1783	1783	Kuban Nogai Uprising	Russian Empire	Lesser Nogai Horde
1784	1784	Oman-Zanzibar War	Muscat and Oman	Zanzibar
1784	1784	Kettle War	Dutch Republic	Austria
1784	1784	Sagbadre War	Denmark-Norway; Ada Foah	Anlo Confederacy
1784	1784	Revolt of Horea, Cloșca and Crișan	Transylvania	Peasant rebels
1785	1785	Battle of Rạch Gầm-Xoài Mút	Tây Sơn dynasty	Siam; Nguyễn lords
1785	1786	Burmese–Siamese War (1785–86)	Siam	Burma
1785	1795	Northwest Indian War	United States	Western Confederacy (Kingdom of Great Britain) British Canada
1786	1786	Tây Sơn–Trịnh War	Tây Sơn dynasty	Trịnh lords
1786	1787	Lofthuus' Rebellion	Denmark-Norway	Norwegian Peasants
1786	1787	Shays' Rebellion	United States	Daniel Shays and rebels
1787	1787	Prussian invasion of Holland	Prussia (Dutch Republic) Orangists	(Dutch Republic) States of Holland (Dutch Republic) Patriots
1787	1787	Burmese–Siamese War (1787)	Burmese Empire	Siam
1787	1791	Austro-Turkish War (1787–1791)	Austria; Russia	Ottoman Empire
1787	1792	Russo-Turkish War (1787–92)	Russian Empire	Ottoman Empire
1787	1802	Tây Sơn–Nguyễn War (1787–1802)	Nguyễn lords	Tây Sơn dynasty
1788	1790	Russo-Swedish War (1788–1790)	Sweden	Russia
1788	1789	Theatre War	Denmark–Norway	Sweden
1788	1934	Australian frontier wars	European settlers	Indigenous Australians
1788	1792	Sino-Nepalese War	Qing dynasty	Kingdom of Nepal
1788	1789	Battle of Ngọc Hồi-Đống Đa	Qing dynasty Lê dynasty	Tây Sơn dynasty
1789	1789	Menashi-Kunashir Rebellion	Tokugawa shogunate	Ainu rebels
1789	1792	Third Anglo-Mysore War	British East India Company Maratha Empire; Hyderabad; Travancore	Mysore
1789	1794	Qajar conquest of the Zand Dynasty	Qajar dynasty	Zand dynasty
1789	1793	Second Xhosa War	Dutch Cape Colony	Xhosa tribesmen
1789	1791	Liège Revolution	Prince-Bishopric of Liège; Austria	Republic of Liège
1789	1790	Brabant Revolution	Austrian Netherlands	Brabant rebels (1789–90); United Belgian States (1790)
1789	1799	French Revolution	Jacobins; Girondins; Sans-Culottes	Monarchists; Moderate Revolutionaries; Realists
1790	1790	Saxon Peasants' Revolt	Electorate of Saxony	Peasant rebels
1790	1802	Pemulwuy Resistance	British Empire	Pemulwuy
1790	1791	Avignon–Comtat Venaissin War	Revolutionary Avignon municipal government Kingdom of France	Papal States: Comtat Venaissin; Union of St. Cecilia (from 1791)
1791	1804	Haitian Revolution	Haiti; Great Britain; Spain (1793–1795); French royalists	France; Polish Legions
1791	1794	Whiskey Rebellion	United States	Frontier tax protestors
1792	1792	Dundiya rebellion	Kingdom of Ahom	Party of Haradutta Bujarbarua
1792	1792	Polish–Russian War of 1792	Russia; Targowica Confederates	Polish–Lithuanian Commonwealth
1792	1792	Burmese–Siamese War (1792)	Burmese Empire	Siam
1792	1797	War of the First Coalition; Part of the French Revolutionary Wars	France; Spain (from 1796); Batavian Republic (from 1795) (Kingdom of Italy (Napoleonic)) French satellite states Polish Legions (from 1795)	First Coalition: Austria; Holy Roman Empire; Prussia (until 1795); Great Britain (Kingdom of France) French Royalists; Spain (until 1795); Portugal; Kingdom of Sardinia (Kingdom of Naples) Naples and Sicily; Other Italian states Ottoman Empire; Dutch Republic (until 1795)
1793	1796	War in the Vendée; Part of the War of the First Coalition	France	(Kingdom of France) Vendéens (Kingdom of France) Chouans (Kingdom of France) Émigrés; Great Britain
1793	1795	Tripolitanian civil war	Karamanli dynasty	Ottoman Tripolitania
1793	1795	War of the Pyrenees	Kingdom of France	Kingdom of Spain
1793	1806	Cotiote War	British East India Company	Kingdom of Kottayam
1794	1794	Nickajack Expedition	American Frontiersmen	Chickamauga Cherokee
1794	1794	Pazvantoğlu Rebellion	Ottoman Empire	Mercenaries
1794	1794	Kościuszko Uprising	Russia; Prussia	Polish–Lithuanian Commonwealth
1794	1804	White Lotus Rebellion	Qing dynasty	White Lotus society
1795	1795	Curaçao Slave Revolt of 1795	Batavian Republic	Slaves
1795	1795	Battle of Krtsanisi	Persian Empire * Ganja Khanate * Erivan Khanate	Kingdom of Kartli-Kakheti; Imereti
1795	1796	Fédon's rebellion	Britain	Grenadian Republicans
1795	1816	Hawkesbury and Nepean Wars	Kingdom of Great Britain	Dharug Nation; Eora Nation; Tharawal Nation; Gandangara Nation
1795	1797	Second Carib War	Britain	Carib slaves
1795	1806	Miao Rebellion (1795–1806)	Qing dynasty	Miao rebels
1796	1796	Persian Expedition of 1796	Russian Empire	Persian Empire
1796	1808	Anglo-Spanish War (1796–1808)	Spain	Great Britain
1797	1797	Denisko uprising	Austria	(Poland) Polish Rebels
1797	1797	Burmese–Siamese War (1797)	Siam	Burma
1798	1798	Peasants' War (1798)	France	Counter-revolutionary peasants
1798	1802	War of the Second Coalition; Part of the French Revolutionary Wars	French Republic; Spain; Polish Legions; Denmark–Norway; French client republics: Batavian Republic; Helvetic Republic; (Kingdom of Italy (Napoleonic)) Cisalpine Republic; (Kingdom of Italy (Napoleonic)) Roman Republic (until 1799); (Kingdom of Italy (Napoleonic)) Parthenopaean Republic (1799)	Second Coalition: Austria; Holy Roman Empire; Great Britain (until 1801); United Kingdom (from 1801); Russia (until 1799) (Kingdom of France) French Royalists; Portugal; Kingdom of Naples; Ottoman Empire
1798	1800	Quasi-War	United States	French Republic
1798	1798	Irish Rebellion of 1798	(Kingdom of Great Britain) British Army (Hesse) Hessian mercenaries	Society of United Irishmen; Defenders; France
1798	1799	Fourth Anglo-Mysore War	British East India Company Maratha Empire; Hyderabad; Travancore	Mysore
1799	1800	War of the South; Part of Haitian Revolution	(French First Republic) Toussaint Louverture	(French First Republic) André Rigaud
1799	1800	Fries's Rebellion	United States	Pennsylvania Dutch Farmers
1799	1803	Third Xhosa War	(United Kingdom of Great Britain and Ireland) Cape Colony	Xhosa tribesmen
