= Saltpeter War =

Saltpeter War (Spanish: Guerra del Salitre) may refer to:

- Saltpeter War (Mexico), 1480–1510
- Saltpeter Wars (Germany), 1725–27, 1738 and 1743–45
- War of the Pacific, 1879–1883
