= Chadd Cumberbatch =

Montserratian dramatist and poet

Chadd Cumberbatch OBE
- Born: Chadd Alphonso Fitzgerald Cumberbatch
- Education: Brighton Polytechnic; University of the West Indies
- Occupation(s): Visual and Performing Artist
- Notable work: Yaya Surfeit (2010) Poetry collection

Chadd Alphonso Fitzgerald Cumberbatch OBE is a Montserratian visual and performing artist, playwright and poet.

== Early life and education ==
Chadd Cumberbatch was born in Montserrat. He studied Fashion Textiles at Brighton Polytechnic, and then returned to Montserrat where he worked as a teacher. While teaching, he wrote and performed poetry and led the design of performance art for the annual masquerades.

From 2011 to 2014, he took a double major in Theatre Arts and Carnival Studies at the University of the West Indies, St Augustine Campus.

== Creative works ==
During the early stages of the volcanic eruption of the Soufrière Hills volcano on Montserrat, which began in 1995, Cumberbatch wrote and published a number of poems on volcanic themes, including Magma Rising. He also created and performed a play, Ash, with A-dZiko Simba Gegele, which explored some of the social and political dimensions of the volcanic crisis for the Montserratians living through it. From 1996, Ash played to audiences on Montserrat, and, later, on St Kitts as a part of the Caribbean Festival of Arts in 1998. In 2025, Cumberbatch and Gegele reprised some of their earlier work in a new collaboration in the UK.

Cumberbatch published his first collection of poetry, Yaya Surfeit: Mellonie Boy Dancing on My Head (Fabwan, Montserrat) in 2010. He has written and directed numerous plays, including Plenty Plenty Yac Ya Ya (2006); Every Wowlah House (2015), to mark the 20th anniversary of the eruption of Soufriere Hills Volcano, Montserrat; and 1768 (2018), a re-imagining of the March 17 uprising on Montserrat in 1768.

From 2015 to 2019, he was director of the Montserrat Arts Council. This role included overseeing and managing national festivals and events, helping to generate economic activity, and preserving and promoting Montserrat's culture. Cumberbatch was succeeded in 2019 by Nerissa Golden. Cumberbatch has represented Montserrat at international cultural festivals, including the Caribbean Festival of Arts (CARIFESTA), and the Bocas Lit Fest on Trinidad and Tobago. His work has been performed and published internationally.

Cumberbatch is one of a number of Montserratian writers and poets, along with Howard Fergus, Yvonne Weekes, Archie Markham and others, whose work has captured the story of the island through the volcanic eruptions of 1995 to 2010, and the aftermath of these events.

=== Selected published works ===
==== Poetry collections ====
- Yaya Surfeit: Mellonie Boy Dancing on My Head (Fabwan, Montserrat, 2010)

==== Poems ====
- Magma Rising (1996), in Eruption: Montserrat versus Volcano, edited by Howard Fergus, University of the West Indies, School of Continuing Studies, Montserrat.
- Norene's Laugh (2017), Cordite Poetry Review.

== Honours ==
Cumberbatch was awarded an Order of the British Empire in the Queen's Birthday Honours of 2007, for services to education on Montserrat.
