= Ottoman campaigns in Circassia (1501–1504) =

Series of military expeditions against the Circassia

- Part of Crimean–Circassian wars and Ottoman–Circassian wars
Date	1501–1504
Location	Circassia; Azov
Result	Circassian victory

Belligerents
Crimean Khanate; Ottoman Empire; Azov Cossacks	Western Circassia; Kabardia

Commanders and leaders
Mehmed I Giray (AWOL) (Ottoman Empire) Şehzade Mehmed †; Auz Cherkas †; Karabay †	Unknown

Strength
(Ottoman Empire) 500: 300 Turks; 200 Circassian mercenaries; 300; Unknown	(Circassia) 400

Casualties and losses
(Ottoman Empire) All killed Many killed 30+ killed	Unknown

The Ottoman campaigns in Circassia (1501–1504), were a series of military expeditions launched by the Ottoman Empire and its vassal, the Crimean Khanate, against the Kabardian Principality and western Circassia. All of these campaigns ended in failure for the Ottomans and their Crimean allies.

== History ==
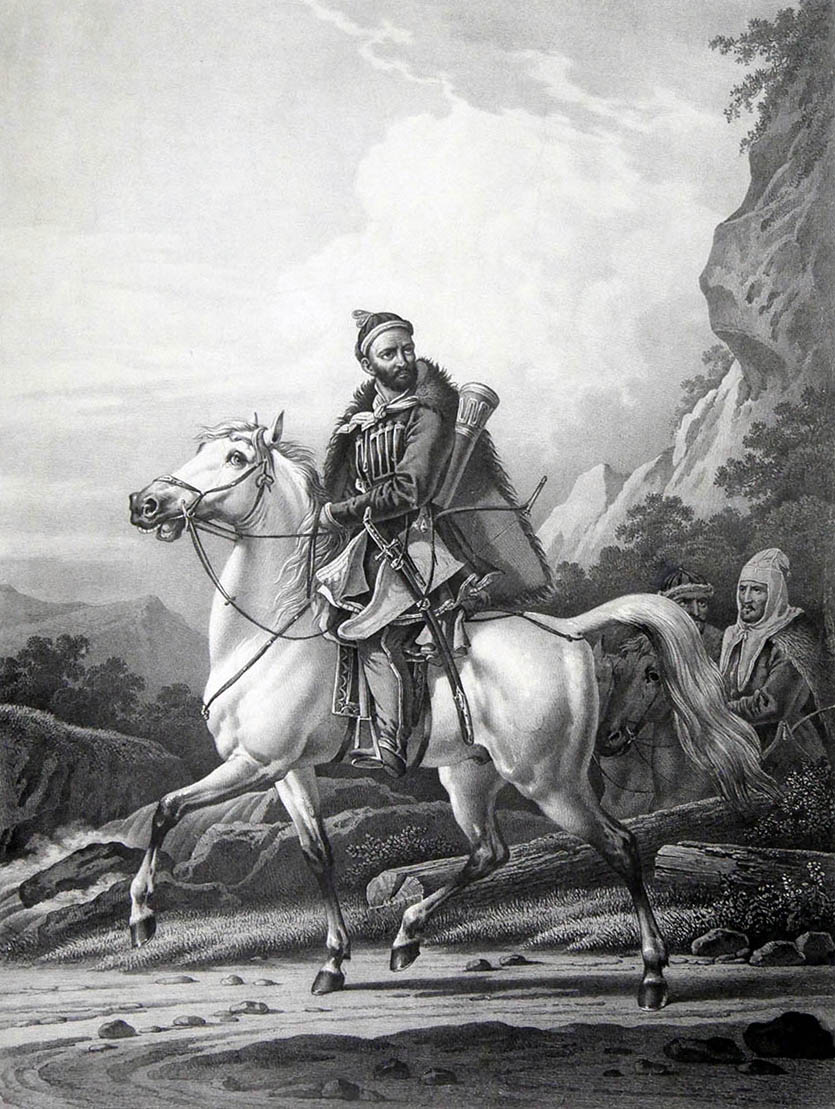
A Circassian Mounted Warrior. Drawn by Aleksander Orłowski and engraved by Godefroy Engelmann.

In the spring of 1501, Ottoman forces under Şehzade (Prince) Mehmed, son of Bayezid II, led a campaign into Circassia. The Ottoman army included the entire garrison of the Eyalet of Kefe, numbering about 500 men, consisting of approximately 300 Turks and 200 Circassians. They were supported by a large force of Crimean Tatars and Azov Cossacks, led by Mehmed Giray, son of Mengli I Giray. However, in a battle against the Circassians, the Ottoman-led force was decisively defeated. The Circassians killed all Ottoman soldiers and the Circassian mercenaries serving the Kefe garrison, while Mehmed Giray fled the battlefield and the majority of his troops were killed. The event was later reported to Moscow by the ambassador Ivan Grigorievich Menshoy Mamonov, who stated:

And the son of the Turks, Mahmet, the Sultan of Kafa, this spring sent an army of three hundred men to Circassia, and two hundred Circassian men who served with Kafa went with them; and the Tsar’s son Murtozin with the Azov Cossacks went with them to Circassia; and the Circassians killed all the Turks and those Circassian men of the Sultan of Kafa; and Murtozin’s son fled, and many of his men were killed.

In the autumn of the same year, Circassians launched a retaliatory raid against Azov, targeting the commander of the Azov garrison who had participated in the spring campaign. A Circassian force numbering about 400 men advanced toward Azov and, after arriving near the city, sent a detachment of 30 men to raid the surrounding area. The Circassians successfully plundered the outskirts of the city and returned with significant booty, including livestock. However, during their retreat, they were pursued by approximately 300 Azov Cossacks under the atamans Auz Cherkas and Karabay, both of whom had taken part in the earlier Ottoman campaign.

After a short pursuit, the Circassians deliberately led the Cossacks toward the main body of their forces and launched a sudden counterattack. In the ensuing clash, the Circassians killed both Cossack leaders and about 30 Cossacks, while the remaining pursuers fled back toward Azov. This episode represents a clear example of a deceptive retreat, a tactic frequently employed by the Circassians. The same ambassador, Ivan Grigorievich Menshoy Mamonov, later reported the event to Moscow as follows:

They say that Circassians with four hundred men came to Azov. And the Circassians, having come five miles from the city, stood at attention, and sent thirty men to the city. And they, riding to Azov, drove away the animals. And the Azov Cossacks Auz Cherkas and Karabay, and in all there were about two hundred of them, went in pursuit of the Circassians who had driven away their animals; and they rushed them against their comrades, where they stood, and the Circassians killed the Azov Cossacks, they say, about thirty men... and they say they killed Auz Cherkas and Karabay on the spot.

The Ottomans later in 1502, launched a second campaign into western Circassia, which also ended in defeat. In 1504, Şehzade Mehmed led a third expedition, this time into Kabardia, likely intending to seize lands controlled by the Idarid (Idarov) dynasty. Mehmed requested military support from the Crimean Khanate, but this request was rejected. The campaign ultimately failed after Mehmed was poisoned on the orders of his father, Bayezid II.

== Aftermath ==
After this unconvincing onslaught, Circassia found itself temporarily freed from Ottoman aggression. A. M. Nekrasov emphasizes that the intensification of the struggle against the Qizilbash, who posed a serious threat to the Ottomans in eastern Anatolia, forced the Ottoman government to halt its offensive in the Western Caucasus.
