= History of Sweden (1611–1648) =

Rise of Sweden as a great power

During the 17th century, despite having scarcely more than 1 million inhabitants, Sweden emerged to have greater foreign influence, after winning wars against Denmark–Norway, the Holy Roman Empire, Russia, and the Polish–Lithuanian Commonwealth. Its contributions during the Thirty Years' War under Gustavus Adolphus helped determine the political, as well as the religious, balance of power in Europe.

== Charles IX ==
On March 6, 1604, when Duke John, son of John III of Sweden and brother of Sigismund III Vasa, formally renounced his hereditary right to the throne, Charles IX of Sweden styled himself king. At the Riksdag of the same year, the estates committed themselves irrevocably to Protestantism by excluding Catholics from the succession to the throne, and prohibiting them from holding any office or dignity in Sweden. Henceforth, every Roman Catholic recusant was to be deprived of his estates and banished from the realm. It was in the reign of Charles IX that Sweden became not only a predominantly Protestant, but also a predominantly military monarchy. This change, which was to give a martial colouring to the whole policy of Sweden for the next hundred and twenty years, dates from a decree of the Riksdag of Linköping establishing, at the urgent suggestion of Charles, a regular army; each Province in the country being henceforth liable to provide and maintain a fixed number of infantry and cavalry for the service of the state. Their immediate enemy was Poland, now dynastically as well as territorially linked to Sweden.

The struggle took the shape of a contest for the possession of the northern Baltic provinces. Estonia was recovered by the Swedes in 1600, but their determined efforts of 1601–1609 to gain a foothold in Livonia were frustrated by the military ability of the Grand Hetman of Lithuania, Jan Karol Chodkiewicz. In 1608 hostilities were transferred to Russian territory. At the beginning of that year Charles had concluded an alliance with Tsar Vasili IV of Russia against their common foe, the Polish king; but when, in 1610, Vasili was deposed by his own subjects and the whole tsardom seemed to be on the verge of dissolution, Sweden's policy towards Russia changed its character.

Hitherto Charles had aimed at supporting the weaker power against the stronger; but now that Russia seemed about to disappear from among the nations of Europe, Swedish statesmen naturally sought some compensation for the expenses of the war before Poland had had time to absorb everything. A beginning was made by the siege and capture of County of Kexholm in Russian Finland March 2, 1611; and on July 16, Great Novgorod was occupied and a convention concluded with the magistrates of that wealthy city whereby Charles IX's second son Philip was to be recognized as tsar, unless in the meantime, relief came to Great Novgorod from Moscow. But now, when everything depended on a concentration of forces, Charles's imprudent assumption of the title of "King of the Lapps of Nordland" which people properly belonged to the Danish Crown, involved him in another war with Denmark, a war known in Scandinavian history as the Kalmar War because the Swedish fortress of Kalmar was the chief theatre of hostilities. Thus the Swedish forces were diverted from their real objective and transferred to another field where even victory would have been comparatively unprofitable. But it was disaster, not victory, which Charles IX of Sweden reaped from this foolhardy enterprise.

Still worse, the Kalmar War, concluded by Charles' son, Gustavus Adolphus, in the second year of his reign, by the Treaty of Knäred, January 20, 1613 imposed pecuniary obligations and intense suffering upon Sweden in order to envoke hatred, which was to last for the next two centuries, the long smouldering antagonism between the two sister nations of Scandinavia which dated back to the bloody days of Christian Tyrant.

== Ingrian War ==
The Russian difficulty was more easily and more honourably adjusted. When Novgorod submitted provisionally to the suzerainty of Sweden, Swedish statesmen had believed, for a moment, in the creation of a Trans-Baltic dominion extending northwards to Arkhangelsk and eastwards to Vologda. The rallying of the Russian nation round the throne of the new tsar, Michael Romanov, dissipated, once and for all, this ambitious dream. By the beginning of 1616, Gustavus had become convinced of the impossibility of partitioning reunited Russia, while Russia recognized the necessity of buying off the invincible Swedes by some cession of territory. By the Treaty of Stolbovo on February 27, 1617, the tsar surrendered to the Swedish king the provinces of County of Kexholm and Ingria, including the fortress of Nöteborg (later Schlusselburg), the key to Finland. Russia, furthermore, renounced all claims upon Estonia and Livonia and paid a war indemnity of 20,000 roubles. In return for these concessions, Gustavus restored Novgorod and acknowledged Michael Romanov as tsar of Russia.

The same period which saw the extension of the Swedish Empire abroad, saw also the peaceful development of the Swedish Rule of constitution at home. In this, as in every other Gustavus matter, Gustavus Adolphus himself took the initiative. Nominally the Riksråd still remained the dominant power in the state; but gradually all real authority had been transferred to the crown. The Privy Council speedily lost its ancient character of a grand council representing the semi feudal landed aristocracy, and became a bureaucracy holding the chief offices of state at the pleasure of the king. The Riksdag also changed its character at the same time. Whilst in every other European country except the Polish–Lithuanian Commonwealth and England the ancient popular representation by estates was about to disappear altogether, in Sweden under Gustavus Adolphus it grew into an integral portion of the Constitution of Sweden. The Riksdag Ordinance of 1617 first converted a turbulent and haphazard mob of "riksdagsmen" huddling together like a flock of sheep or drunken boors, into a dignified national assembly, meeting and deliberating according to rule and order. One of the nobility (first called the Landmarskalk, or Marshal of the Diet, in the Riksdag ordinance of 1526) was now regularly appointed by the king as the spokesman of the House of Nobles, or Riddarhus, while the primate generally acted as the talman or president of the three lower estates, the clergy, burgesses and peasants. Eventually, each of the three lower estates elected its own talman, or speaker. At the opening of every session, the king submitted to the estates "royal propositions", or bills, upon which each estate proceeded to deliberate in its own separate chamber. The replies of the estates were delivered to the king at a subsequent session in congress. Whenever the estates differed amongst themselves, the king chose whatever opinion seemed best to him. The rights of the Riksdag were secured by the Konungaförsäkran, or assurance given by every Swedish king on his accession, guaranteeing the collaboration of the estates in the work of legislation, and they were also to be consulted on all questions of foreign policy. The king possessed the initiative; but the estates had the right of objecting to the measures of the government at the close of each session. It is in Gustavus' reign, too that we first hear of "Hemliga Utskottet", or Secret Committee for the transaction of extraordinary affairs, which was elected by the estates themselves. The eleven Riksdags held by Gustavus Adolphus were almost exclusively occupied in finding ways and means for supporting the ever-increasing burdens of the Polish and German wars. Gustavus owed much of his success as an empire-builder to the religious and patriotic zeal of the Swedes, and their willingness to sacrifice.

== The Polish War and the Battle of Stralsund ==
The wars with Denmark and Russia had been almost exclusively Scandinavian wars, but the Polish war was of worldwide significance. It was, in the first place, a struggle for the Baltic littoral, and the struggle was intensified by the knowledge that the Polish Vasas denied the right of Gustavus to the Swedish throne. In the eyes of the Swedish king, moreover, the Polish War was a war of religion. Gustavus regarded the Scandinavian kingdoms as the two chief pillars on which the Evangelical religion reposed. Their disunion, he argued, would open a door in the north to the Catholic league and so bring about the destruction of Denmark and Sweden alike. Hence his alliance with Denmark to defend Stralsund in 1628. There was much unconscious exaggeration in all this. As a matter of fact the Polish–Lithuanian Commonwealth was no danger whatsoever to Protestantism. Sigismund's obstinate insistence upon his right to the Swedish crown was the one impediment to the conclusion of a war which the Polish Diet heartily detested and very successfully impeded. Apart from the semi-impotent Polish court, no responsible Pole dreamed of aggrandisement in Sweden. In fact, during the subsequent reign of Ladislaus IV of Poland (1632–1648), the Poles prevented that martial monarch from interfering in the Thirty Years' War on the Catholic side. Gustavus, whose lively imagination was easily excited by religious ardour, enormously magnified clerical influence in Poland and frequently scented dangers where only difficulties existed.

For eight years, (1621–1629), the exhausting and expensive Polish War dragged on. Swedish Livonia was conquered by the beginning of 1626, and the theatre of hostilities was transferred to the Prussian provinces of Poland. The fertile and easily defensible delta of the Vistula was now occupied and Gustavus treated it as a permanent conquest, making his great Chancellor Axel Oxenstierna its first Governor-General. But this was the limit of the Swedish advance. All Gustavus's further efforts were frustrated by the superior strategy of the Polish hetman Stanisław Koniecpolski, and in June 1629, the king gladly accepted the lucrative Treaty of Altmark. By this truce Sweden was, for six years, to retain possession of its Livonian conquests, besides holding Elbing, the Vistula delta, and Braunsberg in West Prussia, and Pillau and Memel in East Prussia, with the right to levy tolls at Pillau, Memel, Danzig, Libau and Windau. From these tolls Gustavus derived, in 1629 alone, 500,000 Riksdalers, a sum equivalent to the whole of the extraordinary subsidies granted to him by the Riksdag.

It was for this war that the Swedish warship Vasa, which sank just outside Stockholm, was built. The ship was poorly designed: top-heavy with insufficient ballast, she capsized as soon as she encountered a wind stronger than a breeze. Due to the low salinity of the Baltic Sea, the wreck suffered little damage from shipworms and was salvaged, in surprisingly good condition, in 1961.

== The Thirty Years' War ==
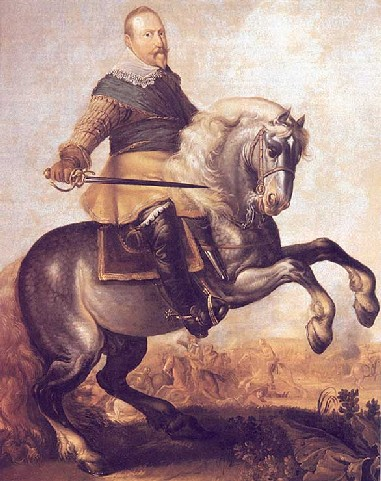
Gustavus Adolphus at the Battle of Breitenfeld

Thus Sweden held, for a time, the control of the principal trade routes of the Baltic up to the very confines of the empire; and the increment of revenue resulting from this commanding position was of material assistance during the earlier stages of the war in Germany, whither Gustavus transferred his forces in June 1630. Gustavus, later to be called "the Lion of the North" due to his skills as a commander, intervened on the Protestant side in the German civil war. Using new military techniques such as lighter and more mobile artillery and cavalry shocks, he won an astounding victory at the Battle of Breitenfeld in 1631. In the Battle of Lützen on November 6, 1632, he was killed, though, and Sweden lost their warrior-king. The battle itself was a draw, but two years later the tide turned at Nördlingen, where Imperial troops won a convincing victory over the Protestant Army. In order to prevent the Habsburgs from winning the war, France, who had already given subsidies to Sweden following the Treaty of Bärwalde (1631), intervened on the Protestant side. The war dragged on for many years until a peace agreement was at last reached in 1648.

== See also ==
- Dominions of Sweden – Territories under the control of Sweden
- History of Estonia
- History of Germany
- History of Latvia
- History of Poland
- History of Sweden
- List of wars involving Sweden
- Possessions of Sweden
