= Montserrat slave rebellion of 1768 =

Rebellion

- Part of slave revolts in North America
- Map of Montserrat (19th century)
- Date: 1768
- Location: Montserrat; 16°42′N 62°12′W
- Goals: Liberation
- Result: Rebellion suppressed

Parties
Enslaved Africans	(United Kingdom) Montserratian slaveowners

Lead figures
Cudjoe (executed)	

Outcome
- Deaths: 9 executed
- Location within the Caribbean

The Montserrat slave rebellion of 1768 was an unsuccessful slave rebellion in the British colony of Montserrat in the Caribbean Sea that took place on 17 March 1768.

== Background ==
Irish colonists began to settle Montserrat in the 1630s following tensions with English colonists in nearby Saint Kitts and started importing African slaves in 1650 to work on the island's cotton, tobacco, and sugarcane plantations. By the late 1760s, as a result of dwindling provisions, labour shortages, and increasingly strict oversight, slaves faced worsening living conditions.

== Uprising ==
By 1768, slaves outnumbered white colonists by three to one, and black and creole Montserratians, led by the slave Cudjoe, decided to stage an uprising against the plantation owners. 17 March was chosen as the day of the uprising as the rebels knew that their Irish enslavers would be drinking heavily for St Patrick's Day.

The rebels planned for domestic slaves at Government House to seize any weapons held there while other slaves would arm themselves with rocks, farm tools, clubs and homemade swords, but the plot was disclosed by a female slave to an Irishwoman, leading to a successful quashing of the rebellion.

== Repercussions ==
Nine rebels, including Cudjoe, were hanged, and his head placed on a silk-cotton tree as a warning to slaves considering another revolt. Thirty other rebels were imprisoned and then sold to other islands.

== Cultural legacy ==
The uprising was forgotten until 1971 when Montserratian scholars discovered references to the rebellion and began to publicise it. In 1985, the Government of Montserrat declared 17 March a national holiday. St Patrick's Day is now the centrepoint of a ten day festival honouring the rebellion and its members.

In 2018, Montserratian playwright Chadd Cumberbatch wrote and directed a new play, 1768, as a theatrical re-imagining of the uprising to mark the 250th anniversary of the events.

== Sources ==
- Bush, B. (1990) Slave Women in Caribbean Society 1650-1838, Heinemann Publishers: Kingston, Jamaica. ISBN 085255 058 8.
- Fergus, H. (1996) Gallery Montserrat: Some Prominent People In Our History, Canoe Press, Montserrat. ISBN 976-8125-25-X.
- Ryzewski, K. & Cherry, J. (2015) "Struggles of a Sugar Society: Surveying Plantation-Era Montserrat, 1650–1850", International Journal of Historical Archeology, 19 (2).
