= Lappvesi Peasant Revolt (1551–1553) =

Revolt during Swedish history

The Lappvesi Peasant Revolt
Date	1551–1553
Location	Southern Karelia
Result	Swedish victory

Belligerents
Sweden	Finnish peasants; Karelians

Commanders and leaders
Gustav Vasa	Maunu Pekanpoika Nyrhi (executed)

Strength
Unknown	Unknown, likely dozens to a few hundreds

Casualties and losses
None	1+ killed

The Lappvesi Peasant Revolt (Swedish: Lappvesi Bondeuppror; 1551–1553) was an uprising by Finnish peasants in southern Karelia, which was part of the Swedish kingdom at the time. The revolt took place between 1551 and 1553, and was sparked by heavy taxation and the burden of quartering officials during local court assemblies.

The unrest began in autumn 1551, when a seven-man delegation of peasants traveled to Stockholm to present their grievances to King Gustav Vasa. The king told them to return with the matter in spring 1552. When they came back, the delegates began spreading false claims, suggesting that the king had promised to hold only two court sessions per year.

In spring 1552, a local farmer named Maunu Pekanpoika Nyrhi took direct action by blocking tax collection in Lappvesi. Later that summer, another group traveled to the king again, but received no clear response.

That autumn, Gustav Vasa sent a letter rejecting the peasants’ demands for tax relief. In response, Henrik Klasson Horn, the governor of Olofsborg Castle, and Gustaf Fincke launched a military crackdown on the revolt.

Nyrhi insisted that only two annual court assemblies were acceptable, and claimed the king had abolished two others. Eventually, the situation escalated, and in 1553, Nyrhi was captured and executed, bringing the revolt to an end.
