= Saltpeter Wars =

18th-century conflicts between peasants and the Austrian monarchy

The Saltpeter Wars (Note: Also spelled Saltpetre Wars or, after German, Salpeter Wars. The actual German name is Salpetererkriege, while the broader conflict may be known as the "Saltpeter Unrest" (Salpetererunruhen).) were three conflicts among the peasants of the County of Hauenstein, the Abbey of Saint Blaise (Sankt Blasien) and the Austrian monarchy in the years 1725–1727, 1738 and 1743–1745. At times the conflict had the character of a civil war between two peasant factions: the müllerisch, named for the early leadership of the miller (müller) Joseph Tröndle, and the salpterisch, so named because one of its early leaders, Hans Albiez, made his money in the saltpeter trade.

== Background ==
The county of Hauenstein, roughly coterminous with the Hotzenwald, lay along the north bank of the Rhine, across from Switzerland in the south of a collection of territories known as Further Austria, since they were ruled by the archduke of Austrian. The archduke, a member of the Habsburg dynasty, was usually also the Holy Roman Emperor and thus both immediate overlord and ultimate sovereign of Hauenstein. The county had about 16,000 inhabitants in 1725, two thirds of whom were serfs of the abbey. Although the fees and services they owed to the abbey were, by the early eighteenth century, "virtually inconsequential", the majority of serfs regarded their servile status as "an intolerable abomination". The primary aim of the serfs in the simmering conflict that preceded the outbreak of warfare in 1725 and lasted into the nineteenth century was to obtain their freedom.

The abbey of Saint Blaise began acquiring extensive properties in Hauenstein in the mid-thirteenth century. It eventually acquired the County of Bonndorf, which possessed Landeshoheit (territorial supremacy) because it was immediately subject to the emperor. In order to defend their interests against the acquisitiveness of the abbey—and in a process similar to that which transpired in Switzerland to the south—the peasants of Hauenstein organised themselves into eight cantons (Einungen, "unions"). In 1370, 1412, 1525 and 1612 the differences of opinion between the peasants and the abbey erupted into open violence. By 1725, each of the cantons was represented by a magistrate elected annually by the adult men. Collectively, they were known as the Eight or the Octovirs, (Note: From the Latin for "eight men"; compare triumvir, quadrumvir.) in German the Einungsmeister. They function as intermediaries between the cantons and the Austrian state and the abbey, and were also the leaders of the müllerisch faction. Austria appointed a forest steward, who in turn appointed bailiffs in each of the cantons. The bailiffs were chosen from among the nominees of the peasants.

== Outbreak of war in 1725 ==
There were four main points of contention between the Einungsmeister, representing the Hauensteiner peasants, and the abbey of Saint Blaise; all were of long standing: (1) the monetarized value of certain services owed the abbey, (2) the abbey's claims on its serfs' inheritances, (3) the severity of the fines imposed by the lower court and (4) the abbey's claim of "sovereignty" or Landeshoheit over its serfs. The dispute of 1725 arose over the abbey's demand for an oath of homage from the peasants, and this was transformed into a full-scale peasant revolt by the abbey's attempt to take a census.

== Sources ==
- Luebke, David Martin (1992). "Factions and Communities in Early Modern Central Europe". Central European History. 25 (3): 281–301. doi:10.1017/s0008938900022123.
- Luebke, David Martin (1998). "Terms of Loyalty: Factional Politics in a Single German Village (Nöggenschwihl, 1725–1745)". In Reinhart, Max (ed.). Infinite Boundaries: Order, Disorder, and Reorder in Early Modern German Culture. Sixteenth Century Journal Publisher.
- McIntosh, Terence (1998). "Review of David Luebke, His Majesty's Rebels (Cornell University Press, 1997)". Journal of Social History. 32 (2): 459–61. doi:10.1353/jsh/32.2.459.
- Robisheaux, Thomas (1998). "The Peasantries of Western Germany, 1300–1750". In Scott, Tom (ed.). The Peasantries of Europe from the Fourteenth to the Eighteenth Centuries. Harlow: Longman. pp. 111–44.
- Tilly, Charles (2004). Contention and Democracy in Europe, 1650–2000. Cambridge University Press.
