= List of ongoing armed conflicts =

Map of ongoing armed conflicts (number of combat-related deaths in current or previous year): Major wars (10,000 or more) Minor wars (1,000–9,999) Conflicts (100–999) Skirmishes and clashes (1–99)

The following is a list of ongoing armed conflicts that are taking place around the world.

== Criteria ==
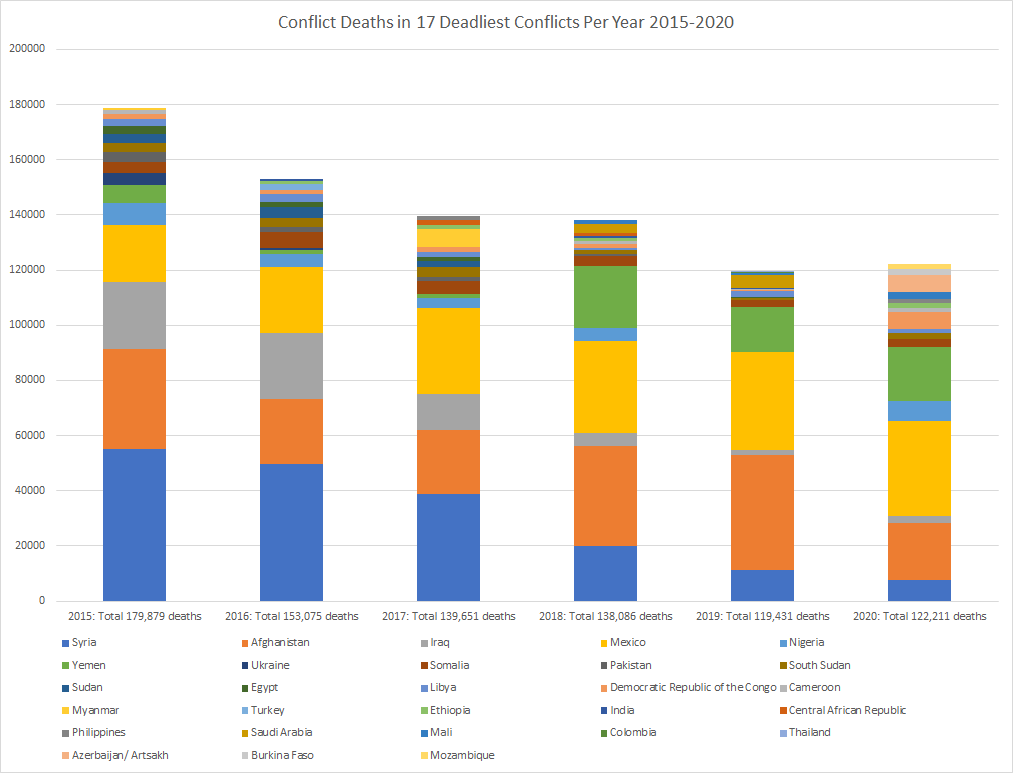
Conflict deaths in the 17 deadliest conflicts 2015–2020

This list of ongoing armed conflicts identifies present-day conflicts and the death toll associated with each conflict. The criteria of inclusion are the following:

- Armed conflicts consist in the use of armed force between two or more organized armed groups, governmental or non-governmental. Interstate, intrastate and non-state armed conflicts are listed.

- This is not a list of countries by intentional homicide rate, and criminal gang violence is generally not included unless there is also significant military or paramilitary involvement.

- Fatality figures include battle-related deaths (military and civilian) as well as civilians intentionally targeted by the parties to an armed conflict. Only direct deaths resulting from violence are included for the current and previous year; excess deaths indirectly resulting from famine, disease, or disruption of services are included along with violent deaths in the cumulative fatalities count when available.
- Listed conflicts have at least 100 cumulative deaths in total and at least 1 death in current or in the past calendar year.
- Fatality totals may be inaccurate or unavailable due to a lack of information. A figure with a plus symbol, indicates that at least that many people have died (e.g. 455+ indicates that at least 455 people have died).
- Location refers to the states where the main violence takes place, not to the warring parties. Italics indicate disputed territories and unrecognized states.
- A territorial dispute or a protest movement which has not experienced deliberate and systematic deaths due to state or paramilitary violence is not considered to be an armed conflict.

Deaths in armed conflicts based on where they occurred

Death rate in armed conflicts based on where they occurred

== List of current wars and conflicts ==
=== Major wars (10,000 or more combat-related deaths in current or previous year) ===
The 9 conflicts in the following list have caused at least 10,000 direct, violent deaths per year in battles between identified groups, in the current or previous calendar year.

Start of conflict	Conflict	Continent	Location	Cumulative fatalities	2025 fatalities	2026 fatalities
1948	Arab–Israeli/Iran–Israel proxy wars (since 2023); Israeli–Palestinian conflict; Gaza conflict (since 2023); Spillover in the West Bank; Israeli settler violence in the West Bank; Palestinian factional conflicts; Salafist insurgency in Gaza; Fatah–Hamas conflict; Anti-PA insurgency in West Bank; Anti-Hamas insurgency in Gaza; Israeli–Lebanese conflict; Hezbollah–Israel conflict (since 2023); 2026 Lebanon war; Israeli–Syrian conflict (since 2012); 2024 Israeli invasion of Syria; Druze insurgency in Southern Syria; Spillover of the Iran war in Syria; Shia insurgency in Bahrain; Red Sea crisis; 2026 Houthi strikes on Israel; Houthi blockade of Saudi Arabia; Bab al-Mandab crisis; 2026 Yemen offensives; 2026 Iran war; Hormuz Strait crisis; Hormuz Strait campaign; US naval blockade; Iranian strikes against Israel; Iranian strikes on Arab states; Iraq strikes; Iraqi Kurdistan; Jordan strikes; Saudi Arabia strikes; Kuwait strikes; Bahrain strikes; Qatar strikes; UAE strikes; Oman strikes	Asia	Israel; Palestine; Lebanon; Syria; Iran; Iraq; Jordan; Saudi Arabia; Kuwait; Bahrain; Qatar; United Arab Emirates; Oman; Yemen; Egypt	254,000–263,000+	28,111	11,914
1948	Myanmar civil war (since 2021); Rohingya conflict; Rakhine State conflict; Karen conflict; Karen–Mon conflict; Kachin conflict; Spillover in Northeast India	Asia	Myanmar; India; Bangladesh; Thailand; China	214,000+	15,917	9,678
1955	Sudanese civil wars (tribal conflicts); South Sudanese civil war; Abyei border conflict; Jonglei clashes; North Sudanese civil war; Kordofan campaign; Blue Nile campaign; SPLM–N–Otoro conflict	Africa	Sudan; South Sudan; Egypt; Libya; Chad; Ethiopia; Central African Republic	1,521,000+	21,994–80,000+	12,443
1960	Congolese conflicts; Katanga insurgency; LRA insurgency; ADF insurgency; Kivu conflict; Ituri conflict (since 2017); M23 offensive; Congolese–Rwandan conflict; Western DR Congo clashes	Africa	Democratic Republic of the Congo; Central African Republic; South Sudan; Rwanda; Burundi; Uganda	219,700+	7,737–10,000+	3,991
1978	Somali Civil War (since 2009); Ethiopian–Somali conflict; Naval operations against Somali piracy; Operation Atalanta; American intervention; Puntland–Somaliland conflict; ISIS insurgency in Puntland; Puntland counter-terrorism operations; Somalian constitutional crisis; Jubaland crisis; Spillover in Kenya	Africa	Somalia; Somaliland; Kenya; Ethiopia	376,200–1,000,000+	10,788	6,580
2002	Islamist insurgencies in the Maghreb/Sahel; Boko Haram insurgency; Boko Haram–ISWAP conflict; Insurgency in Mali; 2026 Mali offensives; Insurgency in Niger; Insurgency in Burkina Faso; Fulani-Mossi conflict; Insurgency in Chad; JNIM–ISSP war; Insurgency in Benin	Africa	Algeria; Benin; Burkina Faso; Cameroon; Chad; Ivory Coast; Libya; Mali; Mauritania; Morocco; Niger; Nigeria; Togo; Tunisia	488,500+	24,046	21,049
2006	Mexican drug war; Gulf Cartel infighting; Los Zetas infighting; Sinaloa Cartel infighting; Spillover in Texas	North America	Mexico; Belize; El Salvador; Honduras; Guatemala; Nicaragua; United States	358,000–417,000	8,973–10,767	6,466
2011	Yemeni civil war (crisis); Al-Qaeda insurgency in Yemen; Saudi Arabian intervention; Houthi–Saudi conflict; 2026 Yemen offensives; Strait of Bab al-Mandab crisis; Houthi–Israeli conflict in the Red Sea; 2026 Houthi strikes on Israel	Asia	Yemen; Saudi Arabia; United Arab Emirates; Israel	385,000+	2,940	10,495
2014	Russo-Ukrainian war (since 2022); Ukrainian resistance in Russian-occupied Ukraine; Attacks in Russia (partisan insurgency and rail war); Belarusian involvement (partisan insurgency); North Korean involvement	Europe	Ukraine; Russia; Belarus	369,028–827,000+	80,245	49,078

=== Minor wars (1,000–9,999 combat-related deaths in current or previous year) ===
The 12 conflicts in the following list have caused at least 1,000 and fewer than 10,000 direct, violent deaths in the current or previous calendar year. Conflicts causing at least 1,000 deaths in one calendar year are considered wars by the Uppsala Conflict Data Program.

Start of conflict	Conflict	Continent	Location	Cumulative fatalities	2025 fatalities	2026 fatalities
1918	Insurgencies in Iran (2026 Iran war); Separatist conflicts in Iran; Kurdish insurgency in Iran; Iran–PJAK conflict; 2026 Kurdish–Iranian crisis (Western Iran clashes); Arab insurgency in Khuzestan; Insurgency in Sistan and Balochistan (Sistan and Balochistan clashes); ISIS insurgency in Iran	Asia	Iran; Iraq; Turkey	47,900+	63	7,060+
1948	Insurgencies in Pakistan; Afghan–Pakistani border conflict (Islamist insurgency); Insurgency in Balochistan; Balochi–ISIS conflict; Spillover in Iran (Sistan and Balochistan clashes); Insurgency in Khyber Pakhtunkhwa; 2026 Afghan–Pakistani war; Insurgency in Sindh	Asia	Pakistan; Afghanistan; Iran	23,100+	985	1,440
1961	Ethiopian civil wars (since 2018); 2026 Ethiopian offensive; Eritrean invasion of Ethiopia; Oromo conflict; OLA insurgency; Gambela conflict; Fano insurgency; Drone strikes during the Fano insurgency; Spillover of the Fano insurgency; Ethiopian–Somali conflict	Africa	Ethiopia; Eritrea; Somalia; Sudan	500,000–616,300+	6,332	6,656
1964	Colombian conflict; Catatumbo campaign; Operation Southern Spear	South America	Colombia; Venezuela; Ecuador	460,300+	2,293	1,799
1978	Afghanistan conflicts; Afghan–Pakistani border conflict; 2026 Afghan–Pakistani war; ISIS–Taliban conflict; Republican insurgency in Afghanistan; Afghan–Tajik border conflict	Asia	Afghanistan; Pakistan; Tajikistan	380,000–2,805,000+	4,409	6,171
1993	Ecuadorian conflict; Communist insurgency in Ecuador; Ecuadorian drug war (since 2024); Operation Southern Spear	South America	Ecuador; Colombia	13,000+	4,073	3,280
1998	Civil conflicts in Nigeria; Religious violence; Boko Haram insurgency; Boko Haram–ISWAP conflict; Herder–farmer conflicts; Nigerian bandit conflict; Separatist conflicts of Nigeria; Niger Delta conflict (since 2016); Southeast Nigerian insurgency; Spillover in Bakassi, Cameroon	Africa	Nigeria; Niger; Cameroon; Chad	107,300+	3,200	3,620
2010	Venezuelan conflict; Pemon conflict; Catatumbo campaign; Operation Southern Spear	South America	Venezuela; Colombia	540+	2,602	409
2011	Aftermath/Spillover of the Syrian civil war; Turkey–ISIS conflict; Israeli intervention; 2024 Israeli invasion of Syria; Druze insurgency in Southern Syria; Spillover of the Iran war in Syria; Western Syria clashes; Hezbollah–Syria clashes	Asia	Syria; Israel; Lebanon; Iraq; Turkey	664,800+	8,837	1,766
2012	Cameroonian conflicts; Boko Haram insurgency; Boko Haram–ISWAP conflict; Anglophone Crisis; Pro-Biafran insurgency in Bakassi	Africa	Cameroon; Nigeria; Niger; Chad	11,000+	1,966	1,684
2012	Central African Republic Civil War; LRA insurgency	Africa	Central African Republic; Cameroon; Democratic Republic of the Congo; South Sudan	16,300+	1,276	539
2018	Haitian conflict (since 2020); Salvadoran military intervention in Haiti	North America	Haiti	25,000+	4,828	2,903

=== Conflicts (100–999 combat-related deaths in current or previous year) ===
The 15 conflicts in the following list have caused at least 100, and fewer than 1,000, direct, violent deaths in the current or previous calendar year.

Start of conflict	Conflict	Continent	Location	Cumulative fatalities	2025 fatalities	2026 fatalities
1918	Kurdish nationalist conflicts; Iranian–Kurdish conflict; Iran–PJAK conflict; 2026 Kurdish–Iranian crisis (Western Iran clashes); Iraqi–Kurdish conflict; Turkish-Kurdish conflict	Asia	Iran; Iraq; Syria; Turkey	135,950–178,450+	300	40+
1921	Insurgencies in Turkey; Kurdish insurgency in Turkey; Maoist insurgency in Turkey; DHKP/C insurgency; ISIS insurgency in Turkey; AK Party–Gülen movement conflict	Asia	Turkey; Syria; Iraq	138,000+	300	5
1943	Jamaican political conflict	North America	Jamaica	1,900+	297	243
1947	Kashmir conflict; Indo-Pakistani border conflict; Indian-Kashmiri insurgency; Sino-Indian border conflict	Asia	India; Pakistan; China	202,200–2,000,000	975	290
1954	Insurgencies in India; Insurgency in Northeast India; Insurgency in Manipur (since 2023); Insurgency in Assam; Insurgency in Nagaland; Insurgency in Arunachal Pradesh; Spillover in Myanmar; Naxalite–Maoist insurgency; Insurgency in Jammu and Kashmir	Asia	India; Myanmar; Bhutan	81,400	980	559
1962	Papua conflict	Oceania	Indonesia	100,400–500,000	259	299
1969	Civil conflict in the Philippines; New People's Army rebellion; ISIS insurgency in the Philippines (since 2023); Philippine drug war	Asia	Philippines	166,600–245,200	537	380
1972	Insurgencies in Bangladesh; Chittagong Hill Tracts conflict; Maoist insurgency in Bangladesh; Spillover of Rohingya conflict from Myanmar	Asia	Bangladesh; Myanmar; India	80,100+	369	318
1975	Cabinda War	Africa	Angola	30,200	200	25
1988	Ethnic violence in Papua New Guinea	Oceania	Papua New Guinea	15,400–20,000	142	204
1992	Brazilian drug war	South America	Brazil; Argentina; Bolivia; Colombia; Peru; Paraguay; Venezuela; France (French Guiana)	50,000+	130+	12+
2003	Iraqi conflict; Iraqi–Kurdish conflict; ISIS insurgency in Iraq	Asia	Iraq	334,700–1,215,000+ (Note: Combined estimated death tolls of each conflict since 2003)	575	461
2011	Libyan crisis; Turkish intervention in Libya	Africa	Libya	30,300–43,000	282	201
2017	Insurgency in Cabo Delgado	Africa	Mozambique; Tanzania	7,800+	824	519
2022	Honduran gang crackdown	North America	Honduras	100+–1,700	561	609

=== Skirmishes and clashes (fewer than 100 combat-related deaths in current and previous year) ===
The 13 conflicts in the following list have caused fewer than 100 direct, violent deaths in the current or previous calendar year.

Start of conflict	Conflict	Continent	Location	Cumulative fatalities	2025 fatalities	2026 fatalities
1957	Ethnic conflict in Ghana: Bawku conflict	Africa	Ghana	300+ (Note: https://ucdp.uu.se/nonstate/5268)	0+	10 (Note: https://www.bbc.com/news/articles/c172g50rz7jo)
1962	Cross border attacks in Sabah/Drug trafficking in Malaysia	Asia	Malaysia; Philippines	134+	3 (Note: https://knowsulu.ph/the-untold-sulu-story/the-death-of-three-fishermen-in-sulu-is-part-of-a-bigger-problem)–6	3+
1970	Western Sahara conflict (since 2020)	Africa	Morocco; Sahrawi Republic	14,000–21,000+	54	6
1975	Insurgency in Laos	Asia	Laos	100,000+	5–75	1
1980	Peruvian conflict (since 2021)	South America	Peru	70,000	47	39
1982	Casamance conflict; ECOWAS military intervention in the Gambia	Africa	Senegal; Gambia	5,000+	6	5
1988	Nagorno-Karabakh conflict; Armenia–Azerbaijan border crisis	Asia	Armenia; Azerbaijan	39,800–49,000+	8	2
1991	North Caucasus conflict; Spillover in Azerbaijan	Europe	Russia; Azerbaijan; Georgia	300,000+	9	3
2004	South Thailand insurgency	Asia	Thailand	7,683+	51	48
2005	Insurgency in Paraguay	South America	Paraguay	166+ (Note: See Insurgency in Paraguay#Casualties)	2	1
2013	Islamic insurgency in Egypt	Africa	Egypt	6,000–7,353+	53	17
2022	Salvadoran gang crackdown	North America	El Salvador	615+	10	9
2023	Sri Lankan drug war	Asia	Sri Lanka	100+	40+	38

== Conflict deaths in the 2020s ==
The 15 conflicts with the most deaths in the 2020s (Note: Data for African countries are based on ACLED, excluding riots/protests-related fatalities)
Rank	Conflict	Deaths in the 2020s	Countries	Continent
1°	Russo-Ukrainian war	440,274	Ukraine; Russia	Europe
2°	Ethiopian civil conflict	148,223	Ethiopia	Africa
3°	Gaza war	88,059	Palestine; Israel	Asia
4°	Mexican drug war	82,953 (Note: Mainly homicides rather than battle-related casualties.)	Mexico	North America
5°	Afghan conflict	80,335	Afghanistan	Asia
6°	Myanmar civil war	67,513	Myanmar	Asia
7°	Yemeni civil war	62,705	Yemen	Asia
8°	Nigerian civil conflict	38,299	Nigeria	Africa
9°	Syrian civil war	32,145	Syria	Asia
10°	Sudanese civil war	30,078	Sudan	Africa
11°	Somali civil war	26,780	Somalia	Africa
12°	Congolese civil war	26,386	DR Congo	Africa
13°	Insurgency in Burkina Faso	25,334	Burkina Faso	Africa
14°	Mali War	17,724	Mali	Africa
15°	Haitian conflict	14,988	Haiti	North America

=== Deaths by country ===
Fatalities related to armed conflict, by country
Rank	2020		2021		2022		2023		2024	
Rank	Country	Deaths	Country	Deaths	Country	Deaths	Country	Deaths	Country	Deaths
1	Mexico	▼34,512	Afghanistan	▲42,223	Ethiopia	▲109,600+	Ukraine	▼95,088+	Ukraine	▼72,960
2	Afghanistan	▼30,974	Yemen	▲31,048	Ukraine	▲100,000+	Palestine	▲22,205+	Palestine	▲29,772
3	Yemen	▲19,561	Ethiopia	▲22,800	Myanmar	▲20,206	Myanmar	▼15,773	Myanmar	▲19,771
4	Syria	▼7,620	Mexico	▼18,811	Mexico	▼14,254	Sudan	▲13,225	Sudan	▲15,526
5	Nigeria	▲7,172	Myanmar	▲11,114	Yemen	▼7,133	Nigeria	▲8,505	Ethiopia	▲10,180
6	DR Congo	▲6,162	Nigeria	▲9,687	Somalia	▲6,484	Burkina Faso	▲8,486	Nigeria	▲9,155
7	Azerbaijan (incl. Nagorno-Karabakh)	▲6,110	DR Congo	▲6,283	DR Congo	▼6,254	Somalia	▲8,342	Mexico	▲8,208
8	Somalia	▲2,950	Syria	▼5,828	Syria	▼5,639	Mexico	▼7,168	Burkina Faso	▼7,522
9	Mali	▲2,734	Somalia	▲3,532	Mali	▲4,793	Syria	▲6,211	Syria	▲6,847
10	Iraq	▲2,436	Iraq	▲2,605	Burkina Faso	▲4,700	Mali	▼4,285	Somalia	▲5,472
11	Burkina Faso	▲2,268	Burkina Faso	▲2,358	Iraq	▲4,181	DR Congo	▼3,902	Russia	▲4,737
12	South Sudan	▲2,245	South Sudan	▼1,986	Afghanistan	▼3,930	Ethiopia	▼3,830	Mali	▼4,001
13	Ethiopia	▲1,813	Mali	▼1,911	Nigeria	▼3,780	Yemen	▼3,169	Lebanon	▲3,813
14	Mozambique	▲1,696	Central African Republic	▲1,704	Niger	▲3,000	Pakistan	▲2,116	DR Congo	▼3,785
15	Libya	▼1,484	Sudan	▲1,584	Colombia	▲2,276	Haiti	▲2,014	Afghanistan	▼3,208
16	Cameroon	▲1,447	Niger	▲1,454	South Sudan	▼1,731	Colombia	▼1,932	Pakistan	▲2,964
17	Philippines	▲1,316	Colombia	▲1,399	Sudan	▼1,327	Israel	▲1,410	Haiti	▲2,441
18	India	▲783	Mozambique	▼1,194	Cameroon	▲943	Iraq	▼1,335	Cameroon	▲2,186
19	Colombia	▲765	Cameroon	▼790	Mozambique	▼916	South Sudan	▼1,240	Yemen	▼1,794
20	Myanmar	▲650	Palestine	▲484	Pakistan	▲900	Cameroon	▲1,042	Colombia	▼1,708

== See also ==
- 2020s in military history
- List of active rebel groups
- Lists of active separatist movements
- List of designated terrorist groups
- List of hostage crises
- List of non-international armed conflicts
- List of number of conflicts per year
- List of proxy wars
- List of rebel groups that control territory
- List of terrorist incidents
- List of wars: 2020–present
- List of wars by death toll
- List of wars extended by diplomatic irregularity
- Frozen conflict
- Casualty recording
- Failed state
