= Bawku conflict =

Ethnic and chieftaincy conflict in Ghana

- Part of ethnic conflict in Ghana and the spillover of the Islamist insurgency in Burkina Faso
Date	1931–present
Location	Bawku Municipal District, Upper East Region, Ghana and Burkina Faso
Status	Ongoing

Belligerents
Kusasi ethnic group	Mamprusi ethnic group	Jama'at Nusrat al-Islam wal-Muslimin

Casualties and losses
- More than 300 killed

The Bawku conflict is a long-standing chieftaincy and ethnic dispute primarily between the Kusasi and the Mamprusi communities in and around the Bawku Municipality of Ghana's Upper East Region, near the border with Burkina Faso. Rooted in the colonial indirect-rule framework and sharpened by post-independence policy reversals, the dispute centres on claims to the paramount chieftaincy (the Bawku skin) and associated land authority. Periodic escalations have led to deaths, injuries, displacement, curfews, and significant economic and social disruption. In July 2025, the government again deployed additional soldiers and tightened curfews following renewed violence, including attacks on schools.

== Background ==
Kusasi communities present themselves as the area's indigenous landholders, organised around earth-priest institutions (tindaana). Mamprusi narratives trace authority to the Mamprugu kingdom, traditionally linked to the figure of Naa Gbewa, and emphasise the historical spread of centralized chieftaincy into the Bawku area. British colonial indirect rule subordinated acephalous groups such as the Kusasi to centralized polities like Mamprugu, creating enduring tensions over authority, tribute, and land administration.

In the late colonial period and after independence, national party politics intersected with the dispute: Kusasi elites were often associated with the Convention People's Party (CPP), while many Mamprusi activists aligned with the opposition Northern People's Party and later the United Party tradition; these alignments influenced state interventions and litigation around the Bawku skin.

== Causes ==
Both sides advance competing legitimacy claims: Kusasi arguments foreground autochthony and land custodianship, whereas Mamprusi claims highlight the precedence of Mamprugu chieftaincy and historical appointments to Bawku. The contest over the Bawku skin thus implicates land rights, access to resources, and local administrative authority, with tensions often rising during farming seasons.

Political decision-making has repeatedly reversed earlier determinations. The 1958 Opoku-Afari Committee and subsequent executive actions recognised a Kusasi candidate as Bawku Naba; after the 1966 coup, NLCD 112 shifted recognition towards Mamprusi; and in 1983 PNDC Law 75 restored Kusasi paramountcy.

Other aggravating factors include the spread of small arms (some trafficked across borders), economic precarity, and the presence of actors who benefit from instability. While observers have raised concerns about potential linkages to Sahelian militancy, open-source analyses in 2024–2025 reported no verified operational ties to jihadist groups in Bawku itself.

== Timeline ==
=== Pre-independence and early escalations ===
The conflict first began in 1931, and later intensified after the death of Bawku Naba Na Awuni in 1956, when rival installations triggered violent confrontations in 1957. In 1958, the Opoku-Afari Committee recommended recognition of Abugrago Azoka (Kusasi), and he was installed as Bawku Naba.

=== Post-independence shifts ===
Following the 1966 coup, the National Liberation Council's NLCD 112 altered the earlier settlement in favour of Mamprusi claimants; PNDC Law 75 (1983) later reinstated Kusasi paramountcy. Violent clashes were recorded in 1983–1985 around these policy turns.

=== Late 20th and early 21st century ===
Major outbreaks recurred around election periods and local disputes. In late 2000 and through 2001, dozens were killed in Bawku mostly mamprusis and surrounding towns, with reports citing about 50 deaths during one December 2001 flare-up and significant displacement. Subsequent bouts of violence were reported in 2007–2010 by Ghanaian media and civil-society monitors.

=== Renewed escalation since 2021 ===
From late 2021, the area saw sustained hostilities and a rising death toll. In August 2023, the Municipal Chief Executive stated that close to 200 people had been killed since November 2021 (a figure he described as exceeding police records). A 2024 policy note by the Clingendael Institute similarly described hundreds of conflict-related fatalities in the period 2021–2024. On 28 October 2024, the Interior Ministry imposed a 6 p.m.–6 a.m. curfew in response to renewed clashes; national media reported additional curfew renewals thereafter.

In July 2025, violence surged again. Reuters reported the killing of a Kusasi chief in Kumasi by people suspected to be mamprusis and three high-school students in separate attacks, prompting the deployment of additional soldiers and tighter curfew measures. Around the same time, Ghanaian outlets reported that gunmen set fire to the residence of Bawku MP Mahama Ayariga.

=== Jihadist involvement ===
In February 2023, near the Burkina Faso border, locals reportedly saw a group of armed men in a forest. In April 2023, the Burkinabe army launched air strikes in the Boulgou province along the Ghanaian border near Widnaba in the Upper East region. The army announced that it had targeted and killed several suspected Islamist terrorists at the border. There were also reports of Jama'at Nusrat al-Islam wal-Muslimin (JNIM) fighter recruiting members near the Burkina Faso border. It is estimated that 200 to 300 Ghanaians have been recruited by jihadist militant groups.

== Impacts ==
The conflict has caused repeated casualties and displacement, disrupted farming and trade, and undermined service delivery in education and health. Business closures and the departure of professionals during escalations have been reported by local and national media, while authorities have periodically imposed curfews and arms bans to stabilize the area.

== Resolution efforts ==
State responses have included curfews, military and police deployments, and ad hoc investigations into specific incidents. Local dialogue initiatives have also emerged. The Bawku Inter-Ethnic Peace Committee was convened in 2009 with support from civil-society actors to facilitate community-level engagement. Ghanaian NGOs such as the West Africa Network for Peacebuilding (WANEP) and local associations have supported mediation, early-warning, and livelihood interventions, sometimes with UNDP/UNICEF programmatic backing.

Since 2023–2025, the Asantehene, Otumfuo Osei Tutu II, has chaired formal mediation sessions with representatives of the parties, backed by government and security officials, with periodic public affirmations from national leaders encouraging cooperation with the process.

On Tuesday, December 16, 2025 Otumfuo presented his mediation report to President John Dramani Mahamaat at the Jubilee House as part of efforts to secure lasting peace in the area. He clarified that the process was a mediation exercise and not arbitration. Per Asantehene mediation process, he identified and recommended Asigri Abugrago Azorka II as the lawful Bawku Naba and urged all parties involved to respect the decision to ensure a lasting peace is restore in Bawku and the wider Kusasi traditional area.
