= Ajnad Bayt Al-Maqdis =

Islamic splinter group

- أجناد بيت المقدس
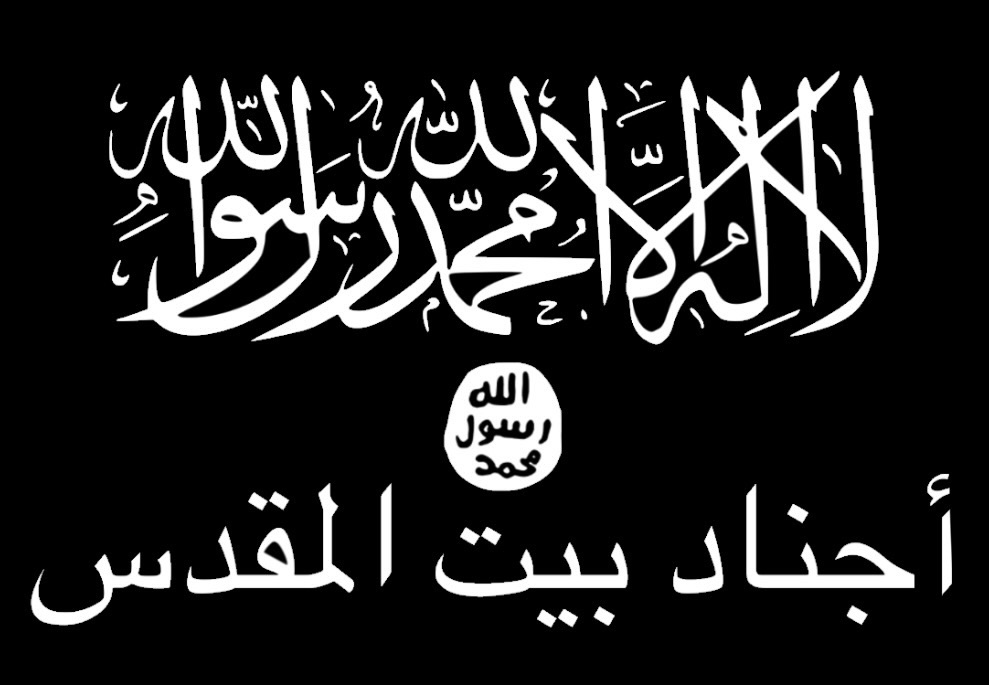
- Founded: February 2026
- Allegiance: Al-Qaeda (Not acknowledged/self-claimed)
- Group: Jund Al-Aqsa
- Active regions: Syria; Iraq
- Ideology: Salafism; Salafi Jihadism; Islamism; Anti-Zionist
- Wars: Syria in the 2026 Iran war

Ajnad Bayt al-Maqdis (Arabic: أجناد بيت المقدس, lit. 'Soldiers of Jerusalem') is a name associated with militant splinter elements and newly emerged small-scale or purported Al-Qaeda linked structures appearing in regional contexts like Iraq and Syria, while the closely related phrasing heavily overlaps with historical and alternate group names in the Middle East.

== Operational claims ==
On 2 March 2026, the group made its first operational claimed responsibility for an attack on a base in al-Shaddadi with two 107mm Katyusha rockets. The group, which had formerly declared loyalty to Al-Qaeda, stated that the action was carried out "in response to the recent Zio-Crusader campaign led by the criminal Trump and the child-killer Netanyahu against the Islamic Ummah". The group also said that the attack was carried out by one of its brigades, "Jund al-Aqsa". and it described itself as active in both Iraq and Syria. The Islamic Resistance Front in Syria also claimed responsibility for the attack, the Syrian Popular Resistance also claimed responsibility, stating that it was a "precise attack with appropriate weaponry". An intercepted missile fell in Al-Fatih, Jableh countryside.

On April 10, Ajnad Bayt Al-Maqdis claimed responsibility for several attacks carried out in the "U.S. and Israeli targets in Syria", claiming attacks in Quneitra Governorate and Palmyra.

== Statements ==
=== Statement 1 Arabic ===
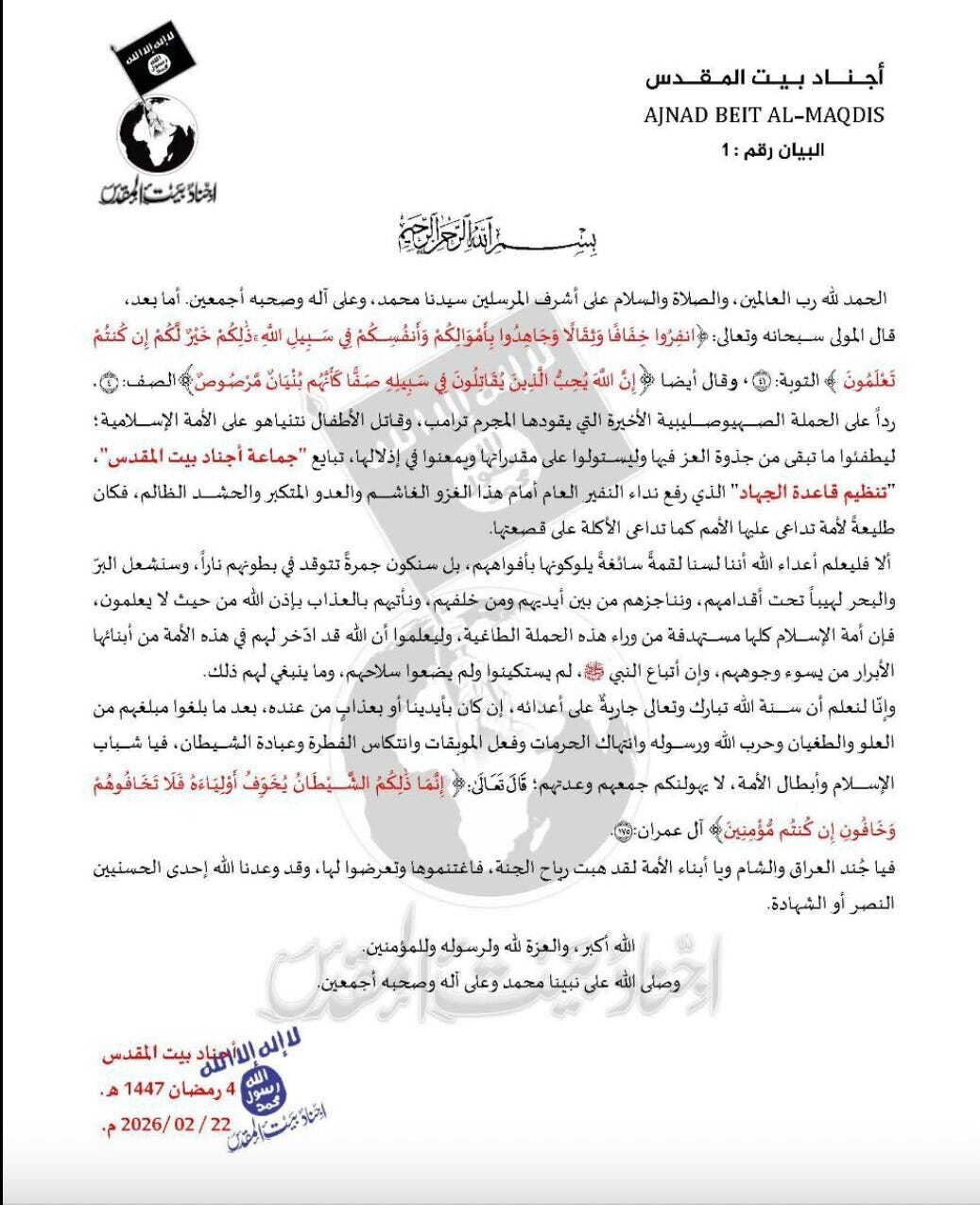
Statement from the group

=== Statement 1 translated to English ===
In the name of Allah, the Most Gracious, the Most Merciful Praise be to Allah, Lord of the Worlds, and peace and blessings be upon the noblest of messengers, our master Muhammad, and upon his family and all his companions. To proceed:

The Almighty, the Exalted, said: “Go forth, whether light or heavy, and strive with your wealth and your lives in the cause of Allah. That is better for you, if you only knew.” (At-Tawbah 9:41) And Allah also said: “Indeed, Allah loves those who fight in His cause in ranks as though they were a solid structure.” (As-Saff 61:4)

In response to the recent Zionist-Crusader campaign led by the criminal Trump and the child-killer Netanyahu against the Muslim nation, to extinguish what remains of its spirit of dignity, seize its resources, and further humiliate it, the "Ajnad Bayt al-Maqdis Group" pledges allegiance to the al-Qaeda organization, which raised the call to general mobilization against this brutal invasion, arrogant enemy, and oppressive force. It was the vanguard of a nation that other nations have descended upon, like hungry people upon a platter.

Let the enemies of God know that we are not an easy morsel for them to chew; rather, we will be a burning ember in their bellies, and we will ignite the land

And the sea will be a blazing fire under their feet, and we will fight them from before them and from behind them, and we will bring them punishment by God’s permission from where they do not expect. For the entire Muslim nation is targeted behind this tyrannical campaign, and let them know that God has reserved for them in this nation from among its righteous sons those who will make their faces black, and the followers of the Prophet have not yielded nor laid down their weapons, and it is not appropriate for them to do so

And we know that the way of God, Blessed and Exalted is He, is in effect upon His enemies, whether by our hands or by punishment from Him, after they have reached their level of arrogance and tyranny, waging war against God and His Messenger, violating sacred things, committing heinous acts, perverting their natural disposition, and worshipping Satan. So, O youth of Islam and heroes of the nation, do not be intimidated by their gathering and their equipment. God Almighty says: {That is only Satan who frightens [you] of his allies. So do not fear them, but fear Me, if you are [truly] believers.} [Al Imran 3:17]

O soldiers of Iraq and Syria, and O sons of the nation, the winds of Paradise have blown, so seize them and expose yourselves to them. And God has promised us one of two good things: victory or martyrdom

God is the Greatest, and glory belongs to God, His Messenger, and the believers. May God bless our Prophet Muhammad and his family and all his companions.

== Manifesto and alignment ==
According to research compiled by counter-terrorism expert Aymenn Jawad Al-Tamimi, the group released a founding statement backdated to 22 February 2026.

- The Declaration: The manifesto explicitly pledges allegiance to the core al-Qaeda organisation (Qaedat al-Jihad).
- The Rhetoric: The text heavily focuses on regional conflict, framing its mobilization as a direct response to a "Zio-Crusader campaign". It specifically targets political leadership in the United States and Israel.
- Geographic Scope: The group claims to maintain operational activity spanning across both Iraq and Syria.

== Expert analysis and skepticism ==
Security analysts, including researchers tracking jihadist networks on social platforms like X, remain highly skeptical about the group's true nature.

- The "Iran Tool" Allegation: Prominent extremism monitors have noted that the group's specific focus and timing mimic broader regional proxy narratives, leading to speculation that it might function as a front for other regional actors rather than a traditional independent al-Qaeda branch.
- Internal Discord: Online monitoring indicates that even established al-Qaeda supporters are internally divided on whether to recognize Ajnad Bayt al-Maqdis as a legitimate affiliate or dismiss it as a digital fabrication.

== Confusion with other groups ==
The terminology closely resembles Ansar Bait al-Maqdis, a prominent Sinai-based group that later pledged allegiance to the Islamic State as Wilayat Sinai.

The group's sudden appearance online has sparked considerable debate among counter-terrorism analysts regarding its authenticity and strategic positioning.

2014 splinter group Ajnad Misr who broke away from ABM to focus exclusively on attacking Egyptian security forces in Cairo.

Aknaf Bait al-Maqdis, a minor Palestinian-led rebel faction that fought around the Yarmouk Camp in Damascus during the earlier years of the Syrian civil war.
