= List of armed conflicts in 2019 =

Locations of conflicts worldwide in 2019 Major wars, 10,000+ deaths in 2019 Wars, 1,000–9,999 deaths in 2019 Minor conflicts, 100–999 deaths in 2019 Skirmishes and clashes, fewer than 100 deaths in 2019 ← 2018 2020 →

The following is a list of armed conflicts with victims in 2019.

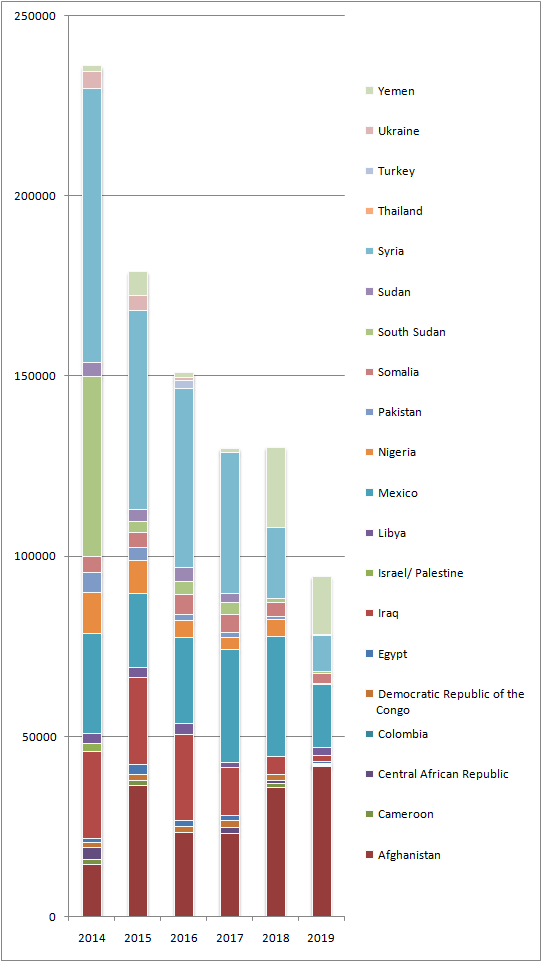
Conflict-related fatalities in the world's 17 deadliest countries from 2014 - 2019.

== List guidelines ==
Listed are the armed conflicts having done globally at least 100 victims and at least 1 victim during the year 2019.

== 10,000+ deaths in 2019 ==
Conflicts in the following list have caused at least 10,000 direct violent deaths in 2019.

| Start of conflict | Conflict | Continent | Location | Fatalities in 2019 |
|---|---|---|---|---|
| 1978 | Afghanistan conflict: Soviet–Afghan War; Afghan Civil War (1989–1992); Afghan Civil War (1992–1996); Afghan Civil War (1996–2001); Current phase | Asia | Afghanistan | 41,735 |
| 2006 | Mexican drug war | North America | Mexico | 35,588 |
| 2011 | Yemeni Crisis: Yemeni Civil War (2015–present); Al-Qaeda insurgency in Yemen; South Yemen insurgency; Saudi–Yemeni border conflict (2015–present); Saudi Arabian-led intervention in Yemen | Asia | Yemen; Saudi Arabia | 20,882 (Note: 16,050 in Yemen, 4,832 in Saudi Arabia) |
| 2011 | Syrian Civil War | Asia | Syria | 11,244 |

== 1,000–9,999 deaths in 2019 ==
Conflicts in the following list have caused at least 1,000 and fewer than 10,000 direct violent deaths in 2019.
Conflicts causing at least 1,000 deaths in one calendar year are considered wars by the Uppsala Conflict Data Program.

| Start of conflict | Conflict | Continent | Location | Fatalities in 2019 |
|---|---|---|---|---|
| 1984 | Kurdish–Turkish conflict: Kurdish–Turkish conflict (2015–present) | Asia | Turkey; Iraq; Syria; Kurdistan | 1,420+ |
| 1991 | Somali Civil War: Current phase | Africa | Somalia; Kenya | 2,637 (Note: 2,604 in Somalia and 33 in Kenya) |
| 2003 | Iraq conflict: Iraq War; Iraqi insurgency (2011–2013); Iraqi Civil War (2014–2017); Iraqi insurgency (2017–present) | Asia | Iraq | 2,362< |
| 2014 | Libyan Crisis: Libyan Civil War (2014–present) | Africa | Libya | 2,200+ |

== 100–999 deaths in 2019 ==
Conflicts in the following list have caused at least 100 and fewer than 1,000 direct violent deaths in 2019.

| Start of conflict | Conflict | Continent | Location | Fatalities in 2019 |
|---|---|---|---|---|
| 2019 | 2019 Brazil prison riots 2019 Altamira prison riot Amazonas prison massacres | South America | Brazil | 224 |
| 1947 | Kashmir conflict (Indo-Pakistani Wars): 2019 India–Pakistan standoff | Asia | India; Pakistan | 208 (Note: ~186 in India, ~22 in Pakistan) |
| 1948 | Insurgency in Balochistan: Sistan and Baluchestan insurgency | Asia | Pakistan; Iran | 143 (Note: 115 in Pakistan, +28 in Iran) |
| 1960 | South Thailand Insurgency | Asia | Thailand | 163 |
| 1964 | Colombian conflict | South America | Colombia; Venezuela; Ecuador | 281 (Note: See) (Note: 238 in Colombia, 16 in Venezuela, 1 in Ecuador) |
| 1965 | Israeli–Palestinian conflict: Gaza–Israel conflict | Asia | Palestine; Israel | 100 |
| 1967 | Naxalite–Maoist insurgency | Asia | India | 196 |
| 1996 | Allied Democratic Forces insurgency | Africa | Democratic Republic of the Congo; Uganda | 170+ (Note: See) |
| 1998 | Communal conflicts in Nigeria | Africa | Nigeria | 152 |
| 1999 | Ituri conflict | Africa | Democratic Republic of the Congo | 302+ |
| 2002 | Insurgency in the Maghreb (2002–present) | Africa | Algeria; Burkina Faso; Chad; Libya; Mali; Mauritania; Morocco; Niger; Tunisia | 1,110 (Note: See (Note: At least 61 in Burkina Faso. The rest may or may not be in other country/countries.)) |
| 2009 | Boko Haram insurgency | Africa | Nigeria; Cameroon; Niger; Chad | 300+ |
| 2011 | Ethnic violence in South Sudan: South Sudanese Civil War | Africa | South Sudan | 519 |
| 2012 | Northern Mali conflict | Africa | Mali | 734+ |
| 2013 | Insurgency in Egypt | Africa | Egypt | 452+ |
| 2014 | War in Donbass | Europe | Ukraine | 119+ (Note: See) |
| 2017 | Anglophone Crisis | Africa | Cameroon | 385+ (Note: See Casualties in 2019) |
| 2017 | Islamist insurgency in Mozambique | Africa | Mozambique | 643+ |
| 2018 | War in Catatumbo | South America | Colombia; Venezuela | 462+ (Note: See) |

== Fewer than 100 deaths in 2019 ==
Conflicts in the following list have caused at least 1 and fewer than 100 direct violent deaths in 2019.

| Start of conflict | Conflict | Continent | Location | Fatalities in 2019 |
|---|---|---|---|---|
| 1922 | Arab separatism in Khuzestan: ASMLA insurgency | Asia | Iran | 1 |
| 1946 | Kurdish separatism in Iran | Asia | Iran | 10 |
| 1948 | Internal conflict in Myanmar: Kachin conflict; Karen conflict; Rohingya conflict | Asia | Myanmar | 84 (Note: See) |
| 1954 | Insurgency in Northeast India: Insurgency in Meghalaya; Assam separatist movements; Insurgency in Manipur; Ethnic conflict in Nagaland | Asia | India | 21 |
| 1963 | West Papua conflict | Asia | Indonesia | 54 |
| 1969 | Moro conflict | Asia | Philippines | 25 |
| 1969 | Communist rebellion in the Philippines | Asia | Philippines | 5 |
| 1975 | Cabinda War | Africa | Angola | 12 |
| 1980 | Internal conflict in Peru | South America | Peru | 3 |
| 1988 | Nagorno-Karabakh conflict | Asia | Armenia; Azerbaijan; Artsakh | 5 |
| 1998 | Dissident Irish Republican campaign | Europe | United Kingdom | 1 |
| 2004 | Insurgency in Khyber Pakhtunkhwa | Asia | Pakistan | 35 |
| 2011 | Shia insurgency in Bahrain | Asia | Bahrain | 2 |
| 2005 | Insurgency in Paraguay | South America | Paraguay | 1 |
| 2006 | Terrorism in Punjab | Asia | Pakistan | 21 |
| 2007 | Terrorism in Sindh | Asia | Pakistan | 13 |
| 2009 | Insurgency in the North Caucasus | Europe | Russia | 14 |
| 2011 | Sinai insurgency | Africa | Egypt | 77+ |
| 2011 | Syrian Civil War spillover in Lebanon | Asia | Lebanon | 5 |
| 2012 | Central African Republic conflict | Africa | Central African Republic | 59 |

== See also ==
- Lists of wars in World (by date, region, type of conflict)
  - Lists of wars and conflict by region
    - Lists of battles (Orders)
  - List of terrorist incidents
    - List of active rebel groups
    - List of designated terrorist organizations
  - List of number of conflicts per year
    - List of most lethal battles in world history
- Africa:
  - List of conflicts in Africa (Military history of Africa)
    - List of modern conflicts in North Africa (Maghreb)
    - Conflicts in the Horn of Africa (East region)
- Americas:
  - List of conflicts in North America
    - List of wars involving the United States
  - List of conflicts in Central America
  - List of conflicts in South America
- Asia:
  - List of conflicts in Asia
  - List of conflicts in the Near East
  - List of conflicts in the Middle East
    - List of modern conflicts in the Middle East
- Europe:
  - List of conflicts in Europe
    - Post-Cold War European conflicts
- Others :
  - List of wars extended by diplomatic irregularity
  - Uppsala Conflict Data Program
  - Failed State
- Ongoing conflicts in World:
  - List of ongoing armed conflicts
  - List of wars 2011–present
    - Ongoing military conflicts
    - Maps of ongoing conflicts
