= Konkomba–Nanumba conflict =

Ethnic conflict in Northern Ghana

Date	1994-2015
Location	Northern Region, Ghana
Result	conflict resolved by 2015

Belligerents
Konkomba tribe: Nawuri	Nanumba tribe: Dagomba tribe; Gonja tribe

Casualties and losses
- 1,000-2,300 dead, 150,000 displaced

Konkomba–Nanumba conflict (also known as the Guinea fowl war) was a tribal war in Northern Ghana in 1994.

== History ==
It was fought between the Konkombas and the Nanumbas, Dagomba and Gonjas tribes on the other side. The basis of the war were tribal claims over land ownership. At least 1000 and as many as 2000 people were killed during the conflict, while 150,000 people were displaced as part of the dispute. Some of the displaced individuals fled to Togo. The Rawlings government was able to slow the conflict by imploring methods that quelled tensions during the fight, eventually leading to much of the conflict being resolved towards the end of 2015.

=== Gonja-Konkomba and Nawuri conflict (1991-1992) ===
The conflict between Gonja on one side and Nawuri and Konkomba on the other side took place mainly in and around Kpanda town in Ghana’s Northern Region. This region is home to a large number of different ethnic groups, who throughout history repeatedly clashed. However, in the early 1990s, the clashes escalated to a previously unseen level of intensity and violence, resulting in two distinct, but interlinked conflicts.

== See also ==
- Ethnic conflict in Ghana
