= Syria in the 2026 Iran war =

- Part of the 2026 Iran war and the Aftermath of the Syrian civil war
- Syria in the 2026 Iran war (Syria) Map of strikes and attacks in Syria during the 2026 Iran war: Strikes from Iran and allies (red); strikes from US and allies (blue); strikes from Islamic extremist groups (black)
Date	28 February 2026 – present
Location	Syria, spillover in Israel, Jordan and Lebanon
Status	Ongoing

Belligerents
Iran; Axis of Resistance; Kataib Jund al-Karrar; Hezbollah; IRI; (Ba'athist Syria) Assadists; IRFS; Saraya al-Thabat (Note: Self-claim); Syrian Popular Resistance; Al-Qaeda; (al-Qaeda) Ajnad Bayt al-Maqdis; Hayat Ansar al-Tawhid al-Islamiyah	Israel; Druze groups; Supreme Legal Committee in Suwayda (until 2026); Administrative Council of Jabal Bashan (since 2026)	Self-defense only: Syria; DAANES; NATO; Turkey

Units involved
Islamic Revolutionary Guard Corps; Kataib Jund al-Karrar; Hezbollah; IRI; Rijal al-Bas al-Shadid; Saraya al-Thabat; Al-Qaeda; (al-Qaeda) Ajnad Bayt al-Maqdis; Hayat Ansar al-Tawhid al-Islamiyah	Israel; Israel Defense Forces; Israeli Air Force; Israeli Ground Forces; Northern Command; Supreme Legal Committee in Suwayda (until 2026); Administrative Council of Jabal Bashan (since 2026); National Guard	Ministry of Defense; Syrian Armed Forces; Syrian Army; 54th Division; 60th Division; Ministry of Interior; Internal Security Command; Syrian Democratic Forces; NATO

Casualties and losses
(Iran) Unknown (Hezbollah) 16 arrested (Note: 5 in April and 11 in May)	(Israel) Unknown	(Syria) Unknown
- 4 killed by missile debris (Suwayda); 4 injured by missile debris (Ein Tarma); 4 civilians arrested by Israel (Jamla)

Syria has remained neutral during the 2026 Iran war, a regional conflict involving Israel, the United States, and Iran, as well as allied non-state actors. However, it suffered collateral damage after Iranian missiles struck Syrian territory. The missiles, believed to have been directed towards Turkey, were shot down by NATO forces. Later strikes were directly aimed against Syrian army positions and strategic locations within Syria proper, especially from Hezbollah.

== Background ==
=== Ba'athist Syria ===
For decades prior, Syria, at the time known as Ba'athist Syria, had been Iran's closest Arab ally and a central component of the "Axis of Resistance", a coalition of non-state actors (and state actors, at the time) who are affiliated with Iran. The alliance arguably dated back to 1979 when the Syrian government at the time was the first to recognize the newly established Islamic Republic and later supported it during the Iran-Iraq War.

Most recently, Iranian forces, including the Islamic Revolutionary Guard Corps (IRGC), were deeply embedded in Syria during the Syrian civil war. This involvement dates back at least as early as in 2013, when Iranian and Hezbollah backing allowed the Syrians to regain control over the strategic Al-Qusayr District. Syria also helped Iran smuggle weapons to its proxies, most notably Hezbollah. This military absence was apparent when during the Twelve-Day War, Syria was not used as a launchpad for Iranian counter offensive strikes against Israel.

=== Fall of Assad ===
However, following the fall of the Assad regime, the newly established caretaker government began to adopt policies aimed at reasserting sovereignty and limiting foreign military influence (including Iranian ones), thus requiring foreign armed groups to either integrate into state structures or leave the country. This was also followed by increased relations with the West and straining relations with Iran and its allies, especially Hezbollah. Thus, following the fall of Bashar al-Assad, relations between the Islamic Republic of Iran and the new Syrian government remained frozen.

=== Start of the 2026 Iran war ===
Despite tension with Iran, however, Syria remained neutral. This neutrality however was not absolute as the Syrian government supported its Arab neighbors following Iranian strikes and also reinforced the border in coordination with Iraq and later on with Lebanon, mobilizing its army to defend itself from possible threats.

On 28 February 2026, various news outlets, including Ynet, Reuters and Anadolu Agency, had reported that an Iranian missile had struck the city of Suwayda, however, the explosion was later attributed to an attempt by the National Guard militia to dismantle a missile from the old regime by the Syrian Arab News Agency.

== Hostilities ==
=== February 28 ===
Several Iranian missiles were intercepted by Israel, falling in southern Syria, an Iranian ballistic missile debris fell on a residential building in Suwayda, killing at least four civilians, however, the explosion was later attributed to an attempt by the National Guard to dismantle a missile from the Assad era according to the Syrian Arab News Agency. Other missile fragments fell in the city of Quneitra and in the Yarmouk Basin.

=== March 1 ===
A jihadist group called "Hayat Ansar al-Tawhid al-Islamiyah" claimed responsibility for an attack with 8 Grad rockets launched from Daraa on the Israeli-occupied Golan Heights. Four people were injured after a missile fragment fell in Ein Tarma.

=== March 2 ===
The group "Ajnad Bayt al-Maqdis" claimed responsibility for an attack on a base in al-Shaddadi with two 107mm Katyusha rockets. The group, which had formerly declared loyalty to Al-Qaeda, stated that the action was carried out "in response to the recent Zio-Crusader campaign led by the criminal Trump and the child-killer Netanyahu against the Islamic Ummah". The group also said that the attack was carried out by one of its brigades, "Jund al-Aqsa". and it described itself as active in both Iraq and Syria. The Islamic Resistance Front in Syria also claimed responsibility for the attack, the Syrian Popular Resistance also claimed responsibility, stating that it was a "precise attack with appropriate weaponry".

An intercepted missile fell in Al-Fatih, Jableh countryside.

=== March 3 ===
The Syrian Army sent troops to its borders with Lebanon, Iraq and the Israeli occupied Golan Heights.

=== March 4 ===
A missile heading towards Turkey was intercepted by NATO near Kurdish-controlled Qamishli International Airport, leading to the missile to land in an empty field where curious locals gathered around the missile; the missile failed to explode. Israel carried out an incursion into southern Syria, shelling the area between Jamla and Saisoun in Daraa Governorate, and arrested four civilians. Israel accused Syria of deploying combat units to the Syrian Golan Heights, stating it will not allow the Hezbollah–Israel strikes to be used as a pretext to "harm the Druze" in southern Syria and demanded the Syrian government prevent Iraqi militias from crossing Syrian territory towards the Golan Heights.

=== March 6 ===
The Rijal al-Bas al-Shadid, a group affiliated with the Islamic Resistance in Iraq, attacked the Rmeilan base with two drones, in retaliation for the "Zionist-American aggression" in Iran. A Lebanese soldier was shot at from the Syrian side of the border while at a Lebanese army post in the Al Qasr-Hermel area.

=== March 8 ===
A Syrian pro-Iranian group called Kataib Jund al-Karrar, claimed attacks in Palmyra, attacks against Israeli targets in the Golan Heights, and an attack in the Tower 22, a military base in Jordan.

=== March 10 ===
Following the Syrian presidency's support for the disarmament of Hezbollah and a campaign of mobilization by the Syrian army on the Lebanese border, shells from Lebanon landed in the town of Serghaya, 20 km (12 mi) from Damascus where the Syrian Armed Forces forces presided. The Syrian government accused Hezbollah of targeting its positions there, amid what they said was a buildup of Hezbollah forces along the border.

=== March 14 ===
The Syrian forces removed mines along the border with Lebanon in the Wadi Khaled area, in anticipation of a possible clashes with Hezbollah.

=== March 19 ===
Rockets were launched from Syria towards Israel and IDF positions in the Syrian Golan Heights; the missiles landed in open areas, without resulting in damage.

=== March 20 ===
Israel bombed southern Syria, saying the strikes were in response to "reports of attacks against Druze civilians" in Suwayda Governorate. The airstrikes also hit several Syrian government positions in Izraa in Daraa Governorate, including command and control centres, supply depots, and facilities held by the 40th Battalion of the Syrian Army, in retaliation to the escalation of hostilities.

=== March 23 ===
The Islamic Resistance in Iraq claimed responsibility for an attack on the Kharab al-Jir base in Hasakah; according to local sources, the drones were launched from Iraqi territory and belonged to pro-Iranian militias, at least six drones attacked the base, and the extent of the damage is unknown, the missiles were launched from Tell al-Hawa, and Syrian forces are coordinating with Iraqi police to arrest those involved, according to Wael Alwan, it was in response to the arrest of a Popular Mobilization Forces cell by Syrian security forces in Deir ez-Zor. During the same day 30 Israeli soldiers carried out incursions in Samdaniyah al-Sharqiyah and advanced toward the Ruwaihina Dam in the northern countryside of Quneitra province.

=== March 28 ===
Missiles originating from Iraq were intercepted over the Al-Tanf base, according to the Syrian Army's Directorate of Operations. Kataib Jund al-Karrar claimed an attack towards the Israeli-occupied Golan Heights.

=== March 29 ===
Four missiles launched from Iraq, fell at the US base of Qasrok, the vice president of the Syrian Ministry of Defense, Sipan Hamo, stated: "We urge Iraq to prevent a recurrence of these attacks, which threaten regional stability". Syrian forces were the ones that intercepted the missiles. The Israeli army led an incursion into Lebanon from the Syrian side of Jabal al-Sheikh, towards the Mount Dov area, in southern Lebanon.

=== March 30 ===
Kataib Jund al-Karrar claimed an attack on Palmyra Airport, with a barrage of missiles that achieved a direct hit, against the US presence in Syria, also claimed responsibility for a drone attack on the Muwaffaq Salti Air Base in Jordan.

=== April 2 ===
Protests took place in the Quneitra Governorate, where dozens of young people marched in cars and motorcycles to protest against Israel and to protest against Israeli practices against Palestinian prisoners, protests also took place in the Daraa Governorate, in Sanamayn, al-Hirak, Nasib, Nawa, Jasim, Inkhil, al-Harra, Sheikh Miskin, Tafas, Jillin, Qarfa and Namer, the Bedouin tribes in Daraa announced a general mobilization against Israel, arriving the southern Syria, near the border with Israel, militants in southern Syria declared that they "will not rest or give up" until the decision is reversed.

The Islamic Resistance Front in Syria conducted an ambush on Israeli forces in Quneitra, reportedly managing to take down a drone. Israel responded with air strikes and artillery bombardment in the region.

=== April 5 ===
The General Authority of Ports and Customs of Syria suspended the crossing of Jdeidat Yabous, following an Israeli threat to bomb the road, the IDF spokesman Avichay Adraee stated that "Lebanese Hezbollah uses the border crossing for military purposes and arms smuggling", Mazen Alloush, the director of public relations for the General Authority of Ports and Customs of Syria, stated that it is exclusively for the passage of civilians and is not used for military purposes, the crossing was closed until further notice, the authorities evacuated the crossing.

=== April 6 ===
Saraya al-Thabat, an Iranian-backed militia within the Islamic Resistance Front in Syria, claimed responsibility for an attack on the Golan Heights, declaring that it is "the first of our operations against the enemy within occupied territories and US bases in Syria, and is the beginning of a series of operations". The group operates in the border between Lebanon and Syria, in clear coordination with Hezbollah.

=== April 10 ===
The Al-Qaeda group, Ajnad Bayt al-Maqdis, claimed responsibility for several attacks carried out in the "U.S. and Israeli targets in Syria", claiming attacks in Quneitra Governorate and Palmyra.

=== April 12 ===
The Ministry of Interior and Internal Security Command announced the arrest of the Bab Touma cell, affiliated with Hezbollah, following an attempt to place an explosive device in front of Rabbi Michael Houri's house, near a Mariamite church in the Bab Tuma in Damascus, Hezbollah denied any connection to the cell.

=== April 16 ===
The Syrian Army's 60th Division took the control of the Qasrak base, following the withdrawal of Combined Joint Task Force – Operation Inherent Resolve.

=== May 5 ===
The Syrian Ministry of Interior and the General Intelligence Directorate announced that the Internal Security Command had arrested a Hezbollah cell accused of trying to destabilize Syria. The cell was alleged to have operated in Aleppo, Rif Dimashq, Homs, Latakia, and Tartus Governorates. Authorities said they had distrupted a "sabotage campaign" and seized a large quantity of explosive devices, RPG grenade launchers, automatic weapons, as well as various types of ammunition and grenades.

=== June 8 ===
Following the launch of Iranian missiles towards Israel, debris from a missile intercepted by Israel fell in Zubayda, in the rural area of Quneitra.

=== July 17 ===
The Islamic Revolutionary Guard Corps claimed to have attacked a US special operations command center in Al-Tanf, Syria, in retaliation for the killing of Iranian soldiers in Iranshahr, within the "Operation Nasr 2".

=== August 10 ===
The Islamic Resistance Front in Syria claimed an attack on the Israeli base of Al-Akou, in the Yarmouk Basin area, the group stated that the attack was "in retaliation for the blood of the martyrs and in response to recent Israeli incursions into the area".

== Reactions ==
=== Domestic ===
- Syria: Syrian Deputy Minister of Defense for the Eastern Region Sîpan Hemo condemned an attack on the US base in Qasrok.
- National Guard: Sheikh Hikmat al-Hijri reaffirmed his support for Israel by calling the Iran war as a "strategic direction of the allies", arguing that Iran has "destabilized the region" and harmed its own people.
- Islamic State: In the Islamic State weekly publication, Al-Naba, the Iran war was portrayed as a "divinely sanctioned" war among the "disbelievers" on both sides.

=== International ===
Saudi Arabia, Qatar, Egypt, and Turkey encouraged Syria to maintain its neutral stance. These countries also intervened with the United States to ease pressure on Syrian president Ahmed al-Sharaa, who has made it clear that he does not wish to become involved in Lebanon.

== Impact ==
=== Gas shortage ===
On February 28, Israel suspended natural gas exports to Egypt, prompting Egypt to reduce its exports to Syria via Jordan. According to Safwan Ahmad, the large-scale smuggling of gas cylinders from Syria into Lebanon was one of the factors contributing to the shortage.

=== Syrian remigration ===
According to the UN refugee agency the total population of Syrian refugees in the entirety of Lebanon was 1.4 million people in March 2026.

Due to the 2026 Lebanon war thousands of individuals of Syrian heritage remigrated back in Syria, especially by using the Joussieh border crossing. A report dated 13 March 2026 by Intersos reported that other local agencies had recorded back on 10 March 2026 that 85,000–90,000 people had crossed the main legal border crossings from Lebanon to Syria. The demographic of these refugees was composed by 93% of Syrian returnees and 7% by Lebanese citizens. By 18 March 2026, only counting the Syrians, 119,000 people had crossed the border from Lebanon into Syria according to UN agency's Displacement Tracking Matrix. The people that had crossed the border in total by then were 125,000 people.

== Threats to civilian and administrative sites ==
On 27 March 2026, Iran threatened to strike three sites which allegedly "hosted" or "supported" U.S. units in the region, such as the Four Seasons Hotel, the Sheraton Damascus Hotel and the People's Palace.

== U.S. push for entry in the war ==
Syria was pressured to militarily intervene in Lebanon by the United States by sending its troops and striking positions in Lebanon alongside the IDF in order to further weaken Hezbollah, however the Syrian government refused the offer on the same day Israel Katz declared a ground invasion of southern Lebanon. Saudi Arabia, Qatar, Egypt, and Turkey discouraged a confrontation between Syria and Hezbollah. Syrian foreign minister Asaad al-Shaibani stated that Syria had no intentions to intervene directly in Lebanon.

On 16 June, Donald Trump stated that he "was not happy" with how Israel had dealt with the Lebanon War, adding that "If Israel can't do the job without killing everyone else, Syria should do the job" in a joint military venture with the United States. He also added that this had already been suggested in the past to both Israel and Syria.

== See also ==
- Druze insurgency in Southern Syria
- Hezbollah–Syria clashes (2024–present)
- Iran–Israel conflict during the Syrian civil war
- Israeli invasion of Syria (2024–present)
- Western Syria clashes
- List of country-specific articles on the 2026 Iran war
