= Ethnic violence in Papua New Guinea =

Ethnic violence in Papua New Guinea often revolves around inter-tribal warfare.

== Background ==
Clans and tribes in New Guinea have fought each other for centuries over various disputes such as land. In more recent times, elections have been a trigger for violence, with tribes aligned down local candidate and party lines. Traditionally the man who initially has the grievance is considered 'the owner of the fight' (or an elder male on behalf of a woman with the grievance) and is responsible for commencing and ending the fight. His clan is expected to support him. Traditional elders and leaders used to have a more stabilizing effect, but their influence has been diminished in recent times as traditional tribal structures have been changing. For example, fights have recently been started by youths against the advice of older clansmen and 'the owner of the fight', whose preference has been for mediation. In the Highlands of Papua New Guinea, tribal warfare has become part of and one of the norms of the society and it is thus seen as inevitable (Paul & Gary, 2020).

Customary rules of war exist. The most consistent rule has been the concept of neutrality, where participants should not attack neutral buildings or people. There are only limited means of enforcing such rules, which are usually passed from father to son or during clan meetings. Older community members feel younger generations do not respect these customs. While the bow and arrow has been the staple weapon for centuries, the recent introduction of the automatic firearms has led to more tragic outcomes.

In 2023, reports indicated that drones have been employed in tribal warfare.

== Islands region ==
=== Bougainville ===
During the Bougainville conflict, the Bougainville Revolutionary Army under Francis Ona fought for secession for Bougainville from Papua New Guinea. Copper mines discovered on Bougainville Island became a major source of revenue for Papua New Guinea. The vast majority of mine workers were from the mainland and the mine was causing environmental damage, leading to tensions. The people of the islands of Bougainville felt a greater cultural and geographical connection to the rest of the Solomon Archipelago, such as the nation of Solomon Islands, than they did to mainland Papua New Guinea. The natives saw themselves as "black-skins" and migrants from the mainland as "red-skins". In the 2019 Bougainvillean independence referendum, voters voted for independence and the PNG government agreed to give independence to Bougainville in 2027.

=== Trobiand Islands ===
In the Trobriand Islands, intertribal warfare was banned during Australian colonial rule and disputes were settled with games of cricket and this often continued after independence. In Kiriwina Island, in 2022, more than 30 people were killed in clashes between the Kulumata and Kuboma.

== Highlands region ==
Highlands conflict
Date	2021 – present
Location	Enga Province, Highlands Region, Papua New Guinea
Status	Ongoing

Belligerents
Yalingin tribe	Yambalekin tribe

Casualties and losses
- 284 dead, 119,000 displaced

In 2021, tribal violence displaced approximately 30,000 people around the Highlands region. In Enga Province, fighting between the Yalingin tribe and the Yambalekin tribe that costs the lives of 80 people and began the year prior ended in a peaceful settlement. In the 2022 national election about 89,000 people were displaced nationwide, with most being from the Highlands region. In 2023 in Enga province, up to 150 people were killed during an outbreak of violence and in 2024, 54 people were killed in an ambush.

== Urban areas ==
In urban areas such as the capital Port Moresby ethnic conflict has included violence between gangs known as Raskols that are associated with different tribes. In Port Moresby the “Kips Kaboni” gang of the local Motu people were involved in attacking residents and gangs of the migrant Tari highlanders.
