= List of armed conflicts in 2020 =

Locations of conflicts worldwide in 2020 Major wars, 10,000+ deaths in 2020 Wars, 1,000–9,999 deaths in 2020 Minor conflict, 100–999 deaths in 2020 Skirmishes and clashes, fewer than 100 deaths in 2020 ← 2019 2026 →

The following is a list of armed conflicts with victims in 2020.

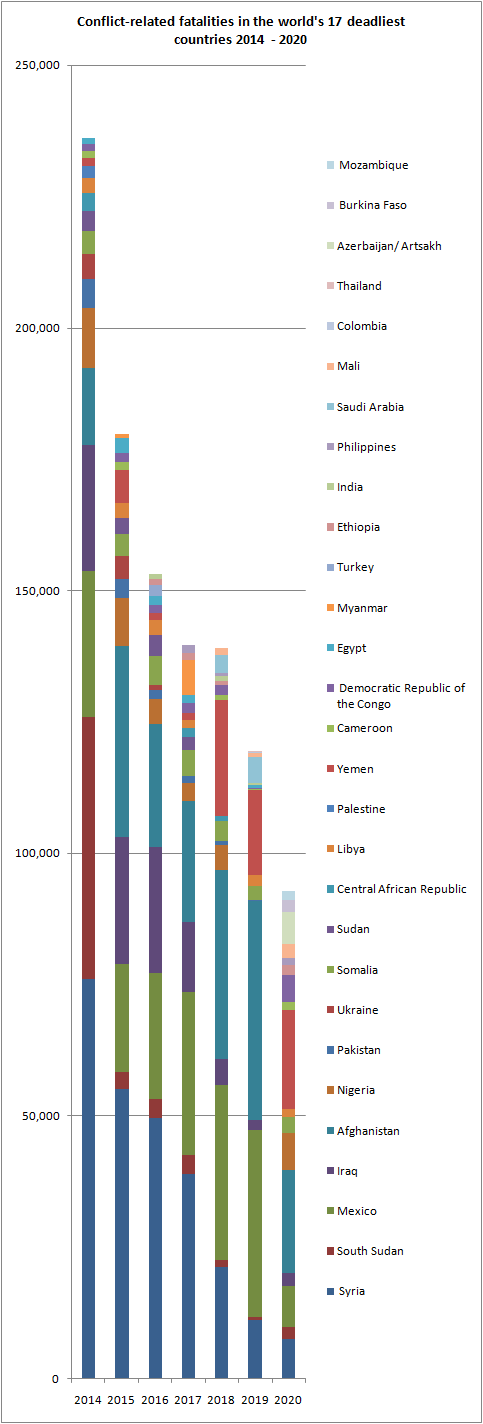
Conflict-related fatalities in the world's 17 deadliest countries 2014 – 2020

== List guidelines ==
Listed are the armed conflicts having done globally at least 100 victims and at least 1 victim during the year 2020.

== 10,000 or more deaths in 2020 ==
Conflicts in the following list have caused at least 10,000 direct violent deaths in 2020.

Start of conflict	Conflict	Continent	Location	Fatalities in 2020
1978	Afghan conflict: War on terror; Current phase; Islamic State–Taliban conflict	Asia	Afghanistan	19,444
2006	Mexican drug war: Infighting in the Gulf Cartel; Infighting in Los Zetas	North America	Mexico	34,512
2011	Yemeni crisis: Yemeni civil war (2014–present); Al-Qaeda insurgency in Yemen; Saudi Arabian–Yemeni border conflict; Saudi-led intervention in the Yemeni civil war	Asia	Yemen; Saudi Arabia	19,056 (Note: 18,991 in Yemen, 65 in Saudi Arabia)

== 1,000–9,999 deaths in 2020 ==
Conflicts in the following list have caused at least 1,000 and fewer than 10,000 direct violent deaths in 2020.
Conflicts causing at least 1,000 deaths in one calendar year are considered wars by the Uppsala Conflict Data Program.

Start of conflict	Conflict	Continent	Location	Fatalities in 2020
1988	Nagorno-Karabakh conflict: Second Nagorno-Karabakh War	Asia	Artsakh; Azerbaijan	6,935
1991	Somali Civil War: Current phase	Africa	Somalia; Kenya	3,082
1999	Ituri conflict	Africa	Democratic Republic of the Congo	1,750
2002	Insurgency in the Maghreb (2002–present)	Africa	Algeria; Burkina Faso; Chad; Libya; Mali; Mauritania; Morocco; Niger; Tunisia	6,700+ (Note: See Casualties in 2020)
2003	Iraq conflict: Islamic State insurgency in Iraq (2017–present)	Asia	Iraq	2,510
2004	Kivu conflict	Africa	Democratic Republic of the Congo	3,319+
2009	Boko Haram insurgency	Africa	Nigeria; Cameroon; Niger; Chad	7,300+ (Note: See Casualties in 2020)
2011	Libyan conflict: Libyan civil war (2014–2020)	Africa	Libya	1,486
2011	Syrian civil war: Inter-rebel conflict during the Syrian civil war; Rojava conflict; Rojava–Islamist conflict	Asia	Syria	6,817–7,673
2011	Ethnic violence in South Sudan	Africa	South Sudan	2,252
2012	Mali War	Africa	Mali	2,754+
2017	Insurgency in Cabo Delgado	Africa	Mozambique; Tanzania	1,717
2020	Tigray War	Africa	Eritrea; Ethiopia; Sudan	1,600+

== 100–999 deaths in 2020 ==
Conflicts in the following list have caused at least 100 and fewer than 1,000 direct violent deaths in 2020.

Start of conflict	Conflict	Continent	Location	Fatalities in 2020
1947	Insurgency in Jammu and Kashmir (Indo-Pakistani wars and conflicts)	Asia	India; Pakistan	700+ (Note: See) (Note: 313 in India, 5 in Pakistan)
1948	Myanmar conflict: Kachin conflict; Karen conflict; Rohingya conflict; Conflict in Rakhine State (2016–present)	Asia	Myanmar	650
1948	Insurgency in Balochistan: Sistan and Baluchestan insurgency	Asia	Pakistan; Iran	400+ (Note: 280 in Pakistan, 40 in Iran)
1963	Katanga insurgency	Africa	DR Congo	168+
1960	South Thailand insurgency	Asia	Thailand	121
1963	Papua conflict	Oceania	Indonesia	100
1964	Colombian conflict: Catatumbo campaign	South America	Colombia	765+
1967	Naxalite–Maoist insurgency	Asia	India	500+
1969	Communist armed conflicts in the Philippines: New People's Army rebellion	Asia	Philippines	155
1973	Oromo conflict	Africa	Ethiopia	420+
1984	Kurdish–Turkish conflict: Kurdish–Turkish conflict (2015–present)	Asia	Turkey; Iraq; Syria	533+
1996	Allied Democratic Forces insurgency	Africa	Democratic Republic of the Congo; Uganda	900+ (Note: See Casualties in 2020)
1998	Communal conflicts in Nigeria	Africa	Nigeria	600+
1999	Internal conflict in Bangladesh: Bangladesh drug war	Asia	Bangladesh	164+
2003	War in Darfur	Africa	Sudan	650+
2004	Insurgency in Khyber Pakhtunkhwa	Asia	Pakistan	209
2011	Sinai insurgency	Africa	Egypt	562+
2011	Sudanese conflict in South Kordofan and Blue Nile	Africa	Sudan	150+
2012	Central African Republic conflict	Africa	Central African Republic	324+
2013	Insurgency in Egypt	Africa	Egypt	595 (Note: See Casualties in 2020)
2014	Russo-Ukrainian War: War in Donbass	Europe	Ukraine	107
2016	Philippine drug war	Asia	Philippines	400+
2017	Anglophone Crisis	Africa	Cameroon	527+ (Note: See Casualties in 2020)
2019	Metekel conflict	Africa	Ethiopia	437+

== Fewer than 100 deaths in 2020 ==
Conflicts in the following list have caused at least 1 and fewer than 100 direct violent deaths in 2020.

Start of conflict	Conflict	Continent	Location	Fatalities in 2020
1922	Arab separatism in Khuzestan	Asia	Iran	34+
1946	Kurdish separatism in Iran	Asia	Iran	52+
1948	Israeli–Palestinian conflict: Gaza–Israel conflict	Asia	Gaza Strip Israel	33
1950	Korean conflict	Asia	North Korea; South Korea	2
1954	Insurgency in Northeast India: Insurgency in Meghalaya; Assam separatist movements; Insurgency in Manipur; Ethnic conflict in Nagaland	Asia	India	25
2020	Afar-Somali clashes	Africa	Ethiopia	27
1970	Western Sahara conflict: 2020 Western Saharan clashes	Africa	Morocco; SADR	0–1+
1975	Cabinda War	Africa	Angola	68
1980	Internal conflict in Peru	South America	Peru	38
1987	Lord's Resistance Army insurgency	Africa	Uganda; South Sudan; Democratic Republic of the Congo; Central African Republic	27+
2005	Insurgency in Paraguay	South America	Paraguay	18 (Note: See Casualties in 2020)
2007	Terrorism in Sindh	Asia	Pakistan	51
2009	Terrorism in Punjab	Asia	Pakistan	16
2015	ISIL insurgency in Tunisia	Africa	Tunisia	13+

== Deaths by country ==
Fatalities related to armed conflict, by country
Rank	Country	Deaths
1	Mexico	▼34,512 (Note: Mainly homicides rather than battle-related casualties.)
2	Afghanistan	▼30,974
3	Yemen	▲19,561
4	Syria	▼7,620
5	Nigeria	▲7,172
6	DR Congo	▲6,162
7	Azerbaijan/ Artsakh	▲6,110
8	Somalia	▲2,950
9	Mali	▲2,734
10	Iraq	▲2,436
11	Burkina Faso	▲2,268
12	South Sudan	▲2,245
13	Ethiopia	▲1,813
14	Mozambique	▲1,696
15	Libya	▼1,484
16	Cameroon	▲1,447
17	Philippines	▲1,316
18	India	▲783
19	Colombia	▲765
20	Myanmar	▲650

== See also ==
- 2020s in military history
- List of wars: 2003–present
- List of number of conflicts per year
- List of civil wars
- List of proxy wars
- List of terrorist incidents
- Lists of active separatist movements
- List of active rebel groups
- List of rebel groups that control territory
- List of designated terrorist groups
- List of wars extended by diplomatic irregularity
- Frozen conflict
- Uppsala Conflict Data Program
- Casualty recording
- Failed state
- Lists of wars in World (by date, region, type of conflict)
  - Lists of wars and conflict by region
    - Lists of battles (Orders)
  - List of terrorist incidents
    - List of active rebel groups
    - List of designated terrorist organizations
  - List of number of conflicts per year
    - List of most lethal battles in world history
- Africa:
  - List of conflicts in Africa (Military history of Africa)
    - List of modern conflicts in North Africa (Maghreb)
    - Conflicts in the Horn of Africa (East region)
- Americas:
  - List of conflicts in North America
    - List of wars involving the United States
  - List of conflicts in Central America
  - List of conflicts in South America
- Asia:
  - List of conflicts in Asia
  - List of conflicts in the Near East
  - List of conflicts in the Middle East
    - List of modern conflicts in the Middle East
- Europe:
  - List of conflicts in Europe
    - Post-Cold War European conflicts
- Others :
  - List of wars extended by diplomatic irregularity
  - Uppsala Conflict Data Program
  - Failed State
- Ongoing conflicts in World:
  - List of ongoing armed conflicts
  - List of wars 2011–present
    - Ongoing military conflicts
    - Maps of ongoing conflicts
