= Western DR Congo clashes =

Ethnic militia clashes since 2022

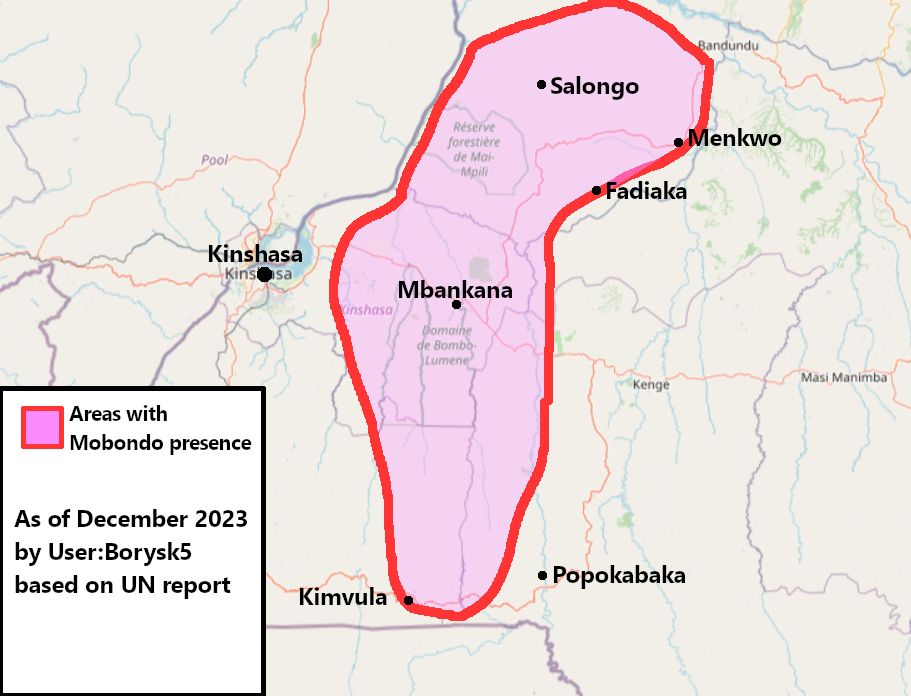
Date	9 June 2022 — present (4 years, 4 months and 3 weeks)
Location	Western Democratic Republic of the Congo (Kongo Central, Kinshasa, Kwango, Kwilu and Mai-Ndombe provinces)
Result	Ongoing

Belligerents
Mobondo militia	Democratic Republic of the Congo

Commanders and leaders
Odon Nkimona Kumbu "Sadam" "Cobra" † "Américain" "Kapenda" "Ephraïm" "Wamba"	(Democratic Republic of the Congo) Brig. Gen. Rabbi-Richard Moyo (Operation Ngemba commander)

Units involved
	FARDC; 11th Military Region; Armed Teke

Casualties and losses
- 3,000+ killed and 550,400 displaced

The clashes in the western Democratic Republic of the Congo are a series of attacks by Mobondo militia on armed forces (FARDC) and Teke civilians which started in June 2022. The conflict has an ethnic component, as the Mobondo is mainly recruited from Yaka and other ethnic groups that are migrating into territories traditionally inhabited by Teke.

The fighting is taking place in the rural areas northeast of Kinshasa and in the surrounding provinces, including Kongo Central, Kwango, Kwilu, and Mai-Ndombe.

The Catholic Church estimates that over 3,000 people have been killed and 550,400 were displaced due to the Mobondo conflict, mainly in the Kwamouth Territory of Mai-Ndombe Province and the Maluku rural commune of the province of Kinshasa. The military has stated that over 1,000 civilians were killed.

== Background ==
The areas north-east of the Democratic Republic of the Congo's capital of Kinshasa, most notably Batéké Plateau, have been historically underdeveloped and poor. The natives of the region mainly belonged to the Teke people. Over time, migrants belonging to ethnic groups of neighboring provinces like Kwilu and Kwango began to drift into traditional Teke territories, seeking land to set up farms. The migrants, mostly Yaka, Mbala and Suku, were allowed to settle on the condition that they paid the Teke chiefs customary taxes. These taxes were also paid by regular Teke farmers, but still perceived as unfair by the migrants.

Tensions gradually increased over the years. Though not common, violent disputes over land ownership periodically occurred in the region. Eventually, the Teke chiefs declared in 2022 that they would increase the customary taxes, outraging many local farmers who refused to pay. The chiefs responded by attempting to use force to collect the taxes. Meanwhile, a fake letter by the Congolese Interior Ministry's chief of staff started to circulate, claiming that the customary taxes had been completely suspended, furthering the tensions.

== Timeline ==
=== 2022 ===
The violence started on 9 June 2022 in the village of Masia-Mbe, in the Bateke Sud sector of Mai Ndombe, where Yaka and Mbala farmers gathered to protest against the tax increase. The crowd marched to the house of a local chief and began to throw stones; the chief's brother responded by opening fire with a hunting rifle and killing one Yaka farmer. In retaliation, Yaka farmers returned in large numbers on the next day, stormed Masia Mbe, burnt the chief's house and looted the village. From this point onward, the conflict over the land and taxes became increasingly violent, with Kwamouth becoming a center of fighting.

In late June, Yaka organized armed groups, collectively named "Mobondo" after protective amulets. The new militia was mainly armed with machetes, bows, spears, and a smaller number of guns, including a few military assault rifles. The Mobondo began to attack Teke communities, killing civilians and looting property. Some Teke also organized armed groups and carried out attacks on Yaka communities, but they were outgunned and soon overrun by the Mobondo. As the militia's operations increased and Teke fled from its attacks, the armed group increasingly shifted from its original motive of tax resistance to full-on conquest of Teke territories. Over the next months, Mobondo raided 43 Teke villages. Yansi people have also been targeted due to being perceived as allies of the Teke. As the attacks escalated, the militia became better organized and rallied around a number of prominent farmers, most prominently Odon Nkimona Kumbu. The latter gave himself a royal Yaka title, "Kiamvu", and started to portray himself as the "traditional king and spiritual leader of the Yaka". In this context, the Mobondo militia was accused to trying to capture the Batéké Plateau due it being allegedly land of the "ancient Yaka kingdom of Lunda". The police issued search warrants on Odon Kiamvu and against five other suspects, including the individuals known as Cobra and Saddam, for their alleged leadership of Mobondo.

=== 2023 ===
On 11 May 2023 Mobondo attacked the locality of Nguma, one soldier and four militiamen were killed. On 29 June Mobondo ambushed a truck with Teke villagers killing around 20 civilians. On 17 September three soldiers and 15 suspected militiamen were killed in a clash near Mulosi. In September 2023 militiamen controlled 73 of the 144 villages in Kwamouth, including Menkwo, Fadiaka, Salongo and Mfumu Zale.

On 16 November armed forces recaptured Nshemamfum and Nsele villages which were occupied by Mobondo for a few months.

=== 2024 ===
On 7 January Mobondo occupied Mbusie village killing four people and injuring two. Ten days later they occupied Menkwo village.

On 23 January 2024 around 10 people were killed in an attack on a village in Kwamouth, and another seven were reportedly killed in the province of Kwango on 2 February. On 6 April five people were killed in Mobondo attack on Engawu.

On 13 July, FARDC repels an attack by Mobondo militiamen on the village of Kinsele, Kwamouth, Democratic Republic of Congo. Forty-two Mobondo militiamen, nine FARDC soldiers and one civilian were killed.

=== 2025 ===
On 23 January, the Catholic Church's Roman Catholic Archdiocese of Kinshasa announced that 3,000 people have been killed and 550,400 were displaced by the fighting against the Mobondo militia in the previous years. The report from the archdiocese warned of the worsening humanitarian situation in the Kwamouth Territory and the Maluku commune because of the Mobondo militia, involving attacks on civilians, forced displacement, and increased crime, which has caused a food shortage and obstructs access to public services.

The FARDC fought off an attack on the village of Bunsele in Kwamouth Territory on 7 February, when the Mobondo militia tried to recover one of their leaders who had been arrested while trying to deliver munitions to them. The army killed six attackers and captured their weapons.

On 2 March the FARDC seized control of the militia's headquarters in the Lweme village, killing eight militiamen, including the chief "Cobra," in the Kwamouth Territory. This was the first militia base to be captured by the military in 2025. Between then and 5 March, the FARDC took control of five other militia strongholds in the Kwamouth Territory, during which fifteen militiamen were killed.

On 3 March, the spokesman for the 11th Military Region Grand Bandundu and the FARDC's Operation Ngemba stated that over 1,000 civilians have been killed since June 2022 by Mobondo militia actions, and that militia members have also kidnapped women and committed sexual violence. The attacks have taken place in the Grand Bandundu provinces of Mai-Ndombe, Kwango, and Kwilu, but also in the Kimvula Territory of Kongo Central and the Maluku rural commune of Kinshasa.

On 24 November, at least 14 people were killed in conflict over land ownership between rival ethnic militias in Nkana, Kwamouth Territory. The few DR soldiers deployed in the village were fired upon by the Mobondo militia, who killed one soldier, and a further thirteen civilians during their retreat.

=== 2026 ===
On 27 March 2026, DRC interior minister Jacquemain Shabani said that the Mobondo militia threat has been brought under control in the Kwilu province. On 10 April 2026, the spokesman of Operation Ngemba announced that hundreds of Mobondo militiamen surrendered to the government between January and March.
