= Karen–Mon conflict =

Conflict in Myanmar

- Part of the Karen conflict in the Myanmar conflict
Date	1988 – present
Location	Kayin State and Mon State
Status	Ongoing

Belligerents
Karen National Union	New Mon State Party

Units involved
Karen National Liberation Army	Mon National Liberation Army

Casualties and losses
Unknown	Unknown

The Karen–Mon conflict is a series of armed clashes between the ethnic rebel armies of the Karen and Mon peoples. The Karen National Liberation Army (KNLA) and the Mon National Liberation Army (MNLA) have clashed sporadically since 1988, mostly around the Myanmar–Thailand border at Three Pagodas Pass.

== Background ==
In recent times, the main area of contention involved the alleged illegal lumbering activities conducted by the Karen National Union (KNU) in areas controlled by the New Mon State Party (NMSP). The NMSP had announced a ban on lumbering activities to prevent deforestation.

Another issue is the control of the area surrounding the Three Pagodas Pass, which allows for the control of trade between Myanmar and Thailand.

== Development of the conflict ==
=== First clash in 1988 ===
The KNLA and the MNLA first clashed in June 1988, in the vicinity of Ye Township and Kyain Seikgyi Township. Despite the formation of a commission of inquiry by the National Democratic Front, an alliance of ethnic armies, to investigate the clashes, tensions between both parties continued to escalate. The KNU had also attacked an outpost of the NMSP within the vicinity of Kyaikmawraw Township.

On 23 July 1988, on the eve of supposed peace talks between the KNU and the NMSP, serious fighting took place at Three Pagodas Pass. The battle lasted for 27 days, resulting in serious casualties for both parties, as well as forcing locals to flee from their homes. The NDF once again intervened to end the conflict, which resulted in a ceasefire between both parties and an agreement to split taxation revenue generated from the Three Pagodas Pass.

=== Resumption of conflict in 2016 ===
Almost 28 years after the initial ceasefire, the 2 armies once again clashed in Yebyu Township, Tanintharyi Region on 8 September over a land dispute. A local village head reported that the fighting had occurred after soldiers from the KNLA went close to an outpost belonging to the MNLA without prior authorization. The brief fighting resulted in a KNLA soldier being injured. The two parties had entered negotiations to resolve the conflict.

Sporadic clashes continued for the next few months over the lack of demarcation between areas controlled by both armies, with both sides accusing the other of territorial invasion. In January 2017, both parties entered talks to settle the dispute, which was mediated by officials from the Tanintharyi Region government.

On 24 February 2018, a skirmish broke out between the two armies near Ye Township, Mon State.

On 4 March 2018, skirmishes between the two parties were reported in Yebyu Township. The next day, the two parties once again clashed in Mudon Township.

On 14 March 2018, the two parties officially agreed to a temporary truce after a meeting at Payathonzu Township to discuss the clashes earlier that month.

=== Clashes with the DKBA ===
On 17 and 18 September 2019, the MNLA launched two attacks on a splinter group of the Democratic Karen Buddhist Army (DKBA). The incident came about after the MNLA issued a deadline for the DKBA splinter group to cease their attempts at setting up a base near the Myanmar–Thailand border at Three Pagodas Pass, which was controlled by the NMSP. No casualties were reported, and the MNLA seized weapons belonging to the DKBA and detained some of its soldiers. The soldiers were later released by the MNLA on 20 September 2019.
