= Qasrok, Syria =

Qasrok
- Village
- Location within Syria
- Coordinates: 36°54′56″N 41°41′49″E
- Country: Syria
- Governorate: Al-Hasakah Governorate
- District: Al-Malikiyah District
- Nahiyah: Al-Yaarubiyah
- Time zone: UTC+3 (EET)
  - Summer (DST): UTC+2 (EEST)

Qasrok (Arabic: قصروك) (Note: Also spelt as Qaṣrūk or Qasrūk.) is a village located in the Al-Malikiyah District of Hasakah Governorate in northeastern Syria.

== History ==
Qasrok was settled by Syriac Orthodox Christians in the 1940s in the territory of Dahām al-Hādī, sheikh of the Shammar tribe. A 14th-century Syriac inscription was found at the village and reported to the local priest in 1948. The Church of St. Shama'ūn Zaitūni at Qasrok was established in 1997.

== Bibliography ==
- Sato, Noriko (2001). Memory and Social Identity among Syrian Orthodox Christians (PDF).
