= Ethnic conflict in Ghana =

Ghana has experienced ethnic conflict throughout its history. Ghana ranks 43rd in the Global Peace Index. and as the most peaceful country in West Africa.

There have been conflicts such as the Konkomba-Nanumba conflict, which was fought because of trade dispute. This war is widely known in Ghana and even other African countries. Of all the ethnic groups, the Ashanti were known for the numerous wars they fought when Ghana was called the Gold Coast (British Colony). "From 1806 until 1896, the Ashanti Kingdom was in a perpetual state of war involving expansion or defense of its domain".

The Ashanti Empire were known for conquering many lands and claiming them. They conquered many lands because they possessed more power than other ethnic groups mainly because of their number and the vastness of their empire. They also fought with the British many times, but the most notable war being the Yaa Asantewaa war in which she led the Ashantis.

== See also ==
- Demographics of Ghana
- Ethnic groups in Ghana
