= Postal orders of South Africa =

Postal orders were issued in South Africa from 31 May 1910. South Africa issued both its own postal orders and British postal orders.

== South African postal orders ==
South Africa began issuing its own postal orders sometime during 1933. They are denominated in both Afrikaans and English.

It is not yet known what the smallest denomination is in the pre-decimal issue, but after the change over to decimal currency on 14 February 1961, there was a postal order for denominations as low as 1 cent. South African postal orders issued as late as 1997 have been confirmed.

As of 2012, South Africa still uses postal orders. These postal orders are issued by the South African Post Office The South African postal order system is still used as a secure way of sending money to a company or organization. Despite the postal order system still being present, it is mostly used for the less technologically equipped citizens or for those who do not have access to cheque or EFT facilities. Some South African government departments still use the system in place of EFT, for example the South African Council of Educators (SACE).

Through the year more modern versions of postal orders have evolved, on example being M-PESA.

== South African-issued British postal orders ==
These were issued from 31 May 1910. Some of the pre-decimal issues were overprinted 'UNION OF SOUTH AFRICA'. From 14 February 1961 to 30 May 1961, British postal orders were overprinted 'UNION OF SOUTH AFRICA' with denominations and poundages in cents and rand. For a short period from 31 May 1961, the decimal postal orders of the Union of South Africa were additionally overprinted 'REPUBLIC OF SOUTH AFRICA'. It is not yet known when these were exhausted and replaced by postal orders overprinted 'REPUBLIC OF SOUTH AFRICA' only. The republican overprinted ones are known to have been issued as late as 1972. It is not yet known when the issue of British postal orders ceased in South Africa.

== See also ==
- Postal orders of the Orange Free State
- Postal orders of the South African Republic
- Postal orders of Bophuthatswana
