= Postal orders of the United Kingdom =

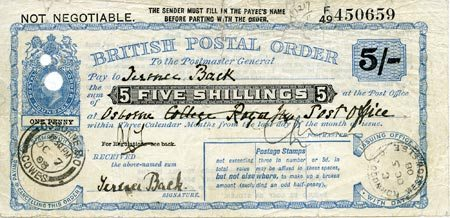
One of the most famous postal orders in history - the one alleged to have been cashed by George Archer-Shee.

Postal orders of the United Kingdom were postal orders that were a type of money order usually intended for sending money through the mail in the United Kingdom. The United Kingdom was the first country in the world to issue postal orders on 1 January 1881. They were the brainchild of the president of the Birmingham Chamber of Commerce, John Skirrow Wright which was to enable poorer people to buy goods and services by post, as they were unlikely to have bank accounts. The rich had bank accounts and could write cheques, whereas the less well-off could only barter or accept payment on the terms of others.

A delegation of the Birmingham Chamber went to the annual meeting of chambers of commerce in London and John Skirrow Wright presented the idea, complete with all the details on how it would work including all the postal order values proposed. At first London bankers were against the idea, thinking it would affect their businesses, and the idea was rejected. However, eventually, the bankers realised that the people who would use postal orders were not their customers and therefore no threat to their business. Consequently, at the Annual Meeting a year later John Skirrow Wright presented the idea again and this time it was accepted and the postal order system was started exactly as Skirrow Wright and Birmingham Chamber had proposed.

== Usage ==
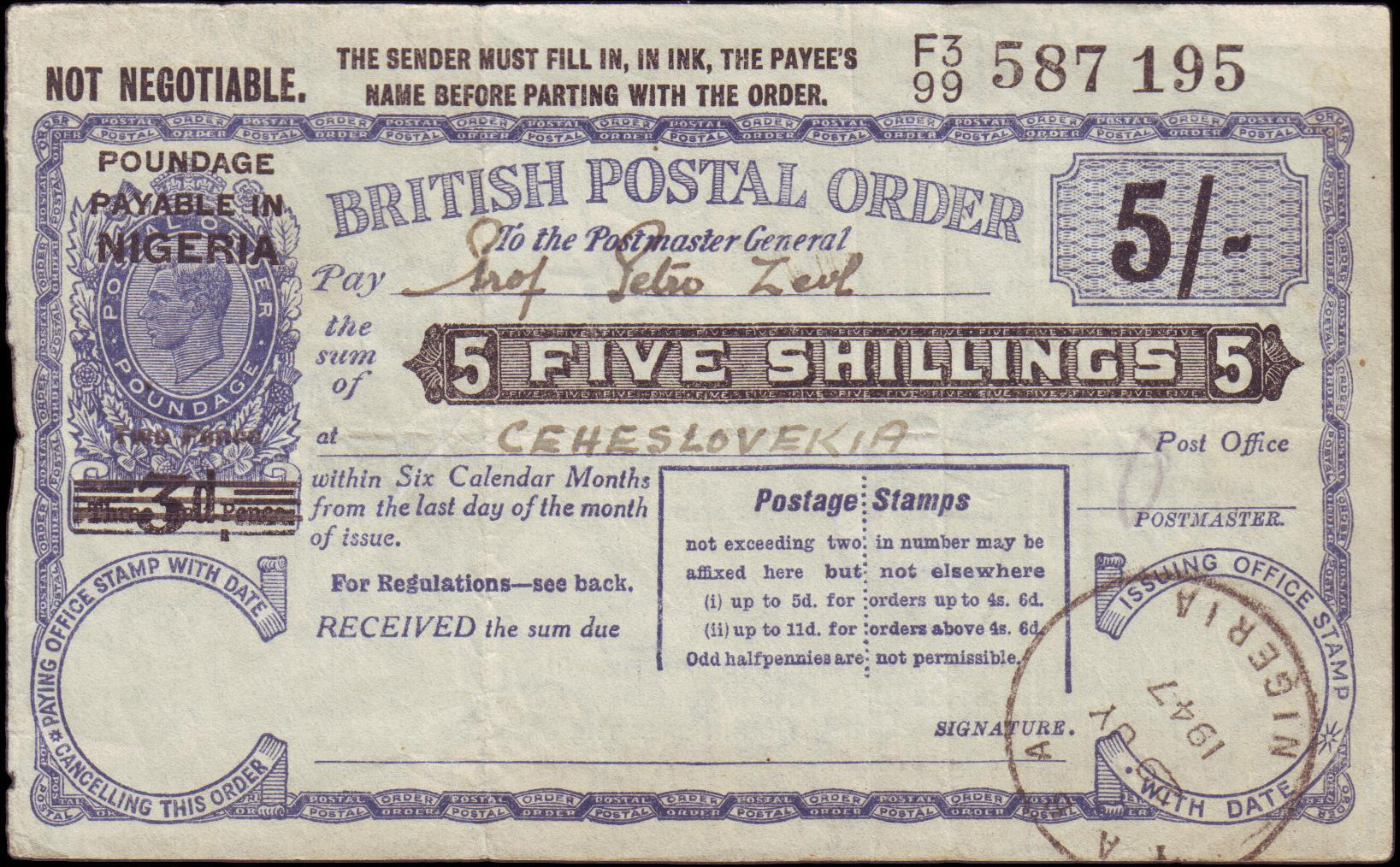
Five-shilling British postal order overprinted for use in Nigeria used in 1947 - 3d additional poundage to be paid in Nigeria

In 1881, the United Kingdom of Great Britain and Ireland included Ireland but in 1922, three-quarters of the island became independent as the Irish Free State and began its own independent issues of postal orders. Since 1922, British postal orders have been issued in the four parts of the UK (England, Scotland, Northern Ireland, and Wales). In the 1880s and 1890s, the issue of postal orders spread to most parts of what was then the British Empire. As time went on, the issue of postal orders declined in most parts of the British Empire, later the British Commonwealth. There are still a number of countries that are issuing postal orders.

From 1895 to 1914, £105.5 million worth of United Kingdom postal orders were issued in the colonies and paid in the United Kingdom.

== Postal orders as legal tender currency ==
During World War I and World War II, the British government declared postal orders legal tender as cash to save paper and labour.

== Decline in postal order use ==
Since 1945, the use of postal orders has declined significantly, as postal orders were a popular form of payment for lottery tickets, in events such as the football pools and for payment for bets on horse racing. The postal orders that were issued from a football pools machine have a perfinned series of numbers and letters; these are sought after by postal order collectors.

In 1971, postal orders still accounted for 270 million transactions but by 1981 this had declined to only 90 million postal order transactions.

== Promotional postal orders ==
Some companies have issued promotional postal orders (PPO) with the permission of Royal Mail as part of their promotions. Such companies include Reader's Digest and Cinzano. These postal orders are classified in a sub-group of their own. They were all issued throughout Great Britain, with one notable exception, the Fife Council PPOs, only issued in Fife, Scotland, which were used to pay for shopping at the stores that were part of the scheme. The Fife Council PPOs were introduced in 1996 and were discontinued on 31 March 2001.

In late 2002, the Royal Mail decided to introduce a series of gift postal orders. These have been retained. Since then, Royal Mail introduced a series of postal orders which can be used for purchases at Argos stores. These have since been withdrawn.

== Postal orders in literature ==
The 1946 play The Winslow Boy by Terence Rattigan, and the two subsequent films based on it, features the story of a schoolboy trying to clear his name over the theft of a five-shilling postal order. The story was loosely based on the real-life George Archer-Shee case.

Postal orders were also referenced by W. H. Auden in the opening words of Night Mail (1936).

== Resurgence and revamp ==
Postal orders are now becoming increasingly popular as a form of payment, thanks to the auction websites such as eBay, and it is much safer for the seller than paying by cheque, as postal orders cannot bounce. The vendor does not have to wait for clearance, which happens with cheques.

In April 2006, the postal order system underwent a revamp, enabling individual post offices to print postal orders on demand in any value from 50p through to 250 pounds, instead of the previous 50p to 20 pounds fixed range. As a result, single postal orders can now be purchased for odd denominations such as 66p or 99p, rather than having to make up odd amounts through a combination of pre-printed denominations and affixed stamps. This has made British postal orders similar to the money orders issued by post offices in the United States and many other countries.

== See also ==
- British Field Post Office postal orders
- Postal Order Society
- Postal orders of Ireland
- Postal orders of New Zealand
- Postal orders of Nigeria
- Promotional postal order
