= Postal orders of British North Borneo =

Historic collectible items

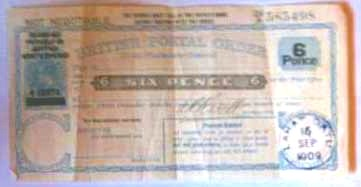
A 6d postal order issued in 1909 in Lahad Datu (British North Borneo) and sold on eBay in 2005 for £980

Postal orders of British North Borneo were issued as British postal orders at various times prior to 1963, when it was ceded to become one of the states of Malaysia under the name of Sabah. Postal orders of British North Borneo are considered as collectible items and listed under a separate issuer entity by the GB Overprints Society and the Postal Order Society.

== Earliest known British North Borneo postal order ==
The earliest known postal order that is known was issued at Lahad Datu in 1909. It was a 6d postal order marked with a local round postmark indicating the location ('Lahad Datu') and date of issuance ('15 SEP 1909'). An overprint in the top left-hand corner reads 'Poundage payable in British North Borneo'. The order's pre-printed postage stamp depicted Edward VII of the United Kingdom, the portrait that was typically used on definitive stamps of the United Kingdom and British colonies at that time.

== Collectibility of the British North Borneo postal orders ==
Any extant examples of British North Borneo postal orders are deemed to be extremely rare and highly priced. For instance, the above 1909 postal order was sold on eBay in July 2005 for £980.

Postal orders of British North Borneo are included in the lists of known issuers maintained by the GB Overprints Society and the Postal Order Society.

== See also ==
- Postal orders of the United Kingdom
