= List of countries that have used postal orders =

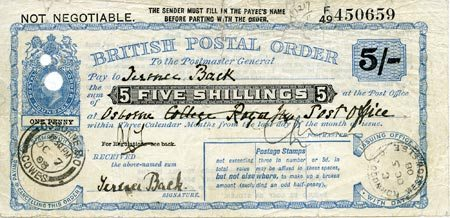
One of the most famous postal orders in history - the one alleged to have been cashed by George Archer-Shee.

This is a list of countries that have used postal orders.

== British Empire and British Commonwealth ==
- Colony of Aden
- Aden Protectorate States
- Alderney
- Anguilla
- Antigua
- Antigua and Barbuda
- Ascension Island
- Australia (classed by issuing state and territory).
- Australian Capital Territory
- The Bahamas
- Bangladesh
- Barbados
- Basutoland (overprinted South African British postal orders issued in Basutoland).
- Bechuanaland Protectorate
- Belize
- Bermuda
- Bophuthatswana
- Botswana
- British Cameroons
- British Central Africa Protectorate
- British Guiana
- British Honduras
- British North Borneo
- British Solomon Islands Protectorate
- British Somaliland Protectorate
- British Virgin Islands
- Brunei
- Colony of Burma
- Canada (classed by issuing province and territory).
- Cape of Good Hope (Cape Colony)
- Ceylon
- Christmas Island (Indian Ocean)
- Ciskei
- Cocos (Keeling) Islands
- Cyprus
- Dominica
- East Africa (classed by country of issue - British Somaliland Protectorate, Kenya, Tanganyika, Uganda, and Zanzibar).
- Falkland Islands
- Fiji
- The Gambia
- Ghana
- Gibraltar
- Gilbert and Ellice Islands
- Gold Coast
- Grenada
- Guernsey
- Guyana
- Gwalior
- Colony of Hong Kong
- India
- Ireland - from 1881 to 1949
- Isle of Man
- Jamaica
- Jersey
- Jhind
- Kenya
- Lagos
- Lesotho
- Malawi
- British Malaya (classed by issuing state and territory).
- Malaysia (classed by issuing state and territory).
- Malta
- Mauritius
- Montserrat
- Nabha
- Namibia
- Colony of Natal
- New Guinea
- New South Wales
- New Zealand
- Nigeria
- Niue
- Norfolk Island
- Northern Rhodesia
- Northern Territory
- Nyasaland
- Orange Free State
- Orange River Colony
- Pakistan
- Palestine
- Territory of Papua
- Papua and New Guinea
- Papua New Guinea
- Patiala
- Pitcairn Islands
- Queensland
- Rhodesia
- Rhodesia and Nyasaland (classed by colony of issue - Nyasaland, Northern Rhodesia, and Southern Rhodesia).
- Saint Helena
- Saint Kitts and Nevis
- Saint Lucia
- Saint Vincent and the Grenadines
- Kingdom of Sarawak (from 1908, when the British postal order system was extended there)
- Colony of Sarawak
- Sark
- Seychelles
- Sierra Leone
- Singapore
- South Africa
- South African Republic
- Federation of South Arabia
- South Australia
- South West Africa
- Southern Nigeria
- Southern Rhodesia
- Sri Lanka
- Straits Settlements (classed by issuing state and territory).
- Swaziland
- Tanganyika
- Tanzania (classed by whether they were issued in Tanganyika or Zanzibar).
- Tasmania
- Tonga
- Transkei
- Transvaal Colony
- Trinidad
- Trinidad and Tobago
- Tristan da Cunha
- Turks Islands
- Uganda
- United Kingdom (classed by constituent country of issue - England, Ireland/Northern Ireland, Scotland, and Wales).
- Venda
- Victoria (Australia)
- Western Australia
- Western Samoa
- Zambia
- Zanzibar
- Zimbabwe

== Other countries ==
- Argentina
- Bahrain
- Bulgaria
- Republic of Burma
- China (Since 1898)
- Colombia
- Dubai
- Ecuador
- Egypt
- Eritrea - overprinted British Postal Orders valid only in Eritrea
- Ethiopia
- France
- Germany
- Iraq
- Ireland - from 1949 to 2001
- Israel
- Italy
- Jordan
- Kuwait
- Kingdom of Libya - during the reign of King Idris I
- Luxembourg
- Mexico
- Kingdom of Nepal
- Persian Gulf (GPO agencies)
- Portugal
- Qatar
- Romania
- Russia (at the time of the Russian Empire)
- San Marino
- Southern Yemen
- Sudan
- Thailand
- Transjordan
- United Arab Republic
- United States of America
- People's Democratic Republic of Yemen

== Special military issues ==
- British Army of the Rhine
- British Forces Post Offices
- Indian Field Force in Egypt
