= Archer Shee =

Archer Shee or Archer-Shee may refer to the following:

- George Archer-Shee (1895–1914), the Naval Cadet whose false accusation of theft inspired the play (and subsequent films) The Winslow Boy
- Martin Archer-Shee (1873–1935), a British army officer and Conservative party politician
- Martin Archer Shee (1769–1850), portrait painter and president of the Royal Academy
