= Postal orders of New Zealand =

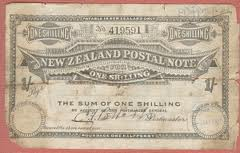
New Zealand 1907 One Shilling Postal Note

Postal orders were issued in New Zealand from 1886 until 1986.

== New Zealand postal notes ==
The first postal notes were issued in 1886. Some of them are known overprinted "SPECIMEN", in 1890. It has been confirmed that the last day of issue was 31 July 1986.

== New Zealand-issued British postal orders ==
It is not yet known when these were first issued. The majority of them were overprinted. They ceased to be issued during 1987 due to the announcement by Mr. (now Sir) Roger Douglas that foreign exchange controls were being abolished.

The 5 shilling denomination was not commonly overprinted.

Any extant examples are very sought after by collectors.

== See also ==
- Postal orders of the United Kingdom
