= Bisi Adegbuyi =

Nigerian public administrator

Nigeria Postmaster General, Nigeria Postal Service
- In office August 2016 – December 2019
- Preceded by: Dr. Richard Balami
- Succeeded by: Dr. Adebayo Adewusi

Personal details
- Born: 11 May 1961 (age 65)
- Citizenship: Nigerian
- Education: University of Lagos
- Occupation: Public servant
- Website: https://www.nipost.gov.ng/

Barrister Bisi Adegbuyi (born 11 May 1961) is a Nigerian lawyer, public administrator, former Nigeria Postmaster General, and CEO of Nigerian Postal Service (NIPOST). In 2014, he represented Ogun State at the National Confab and he is the founder of Grassroots Addressing and Identity Network (GAIN). Adegbuyi succeeded Dr. Richard Balami as the Postmaster General of Nigerian Postal Service in August 2016 under the administration of President Muhammadu Buhari and was removed in December 2019.
