= Postal orders of Nigeria =

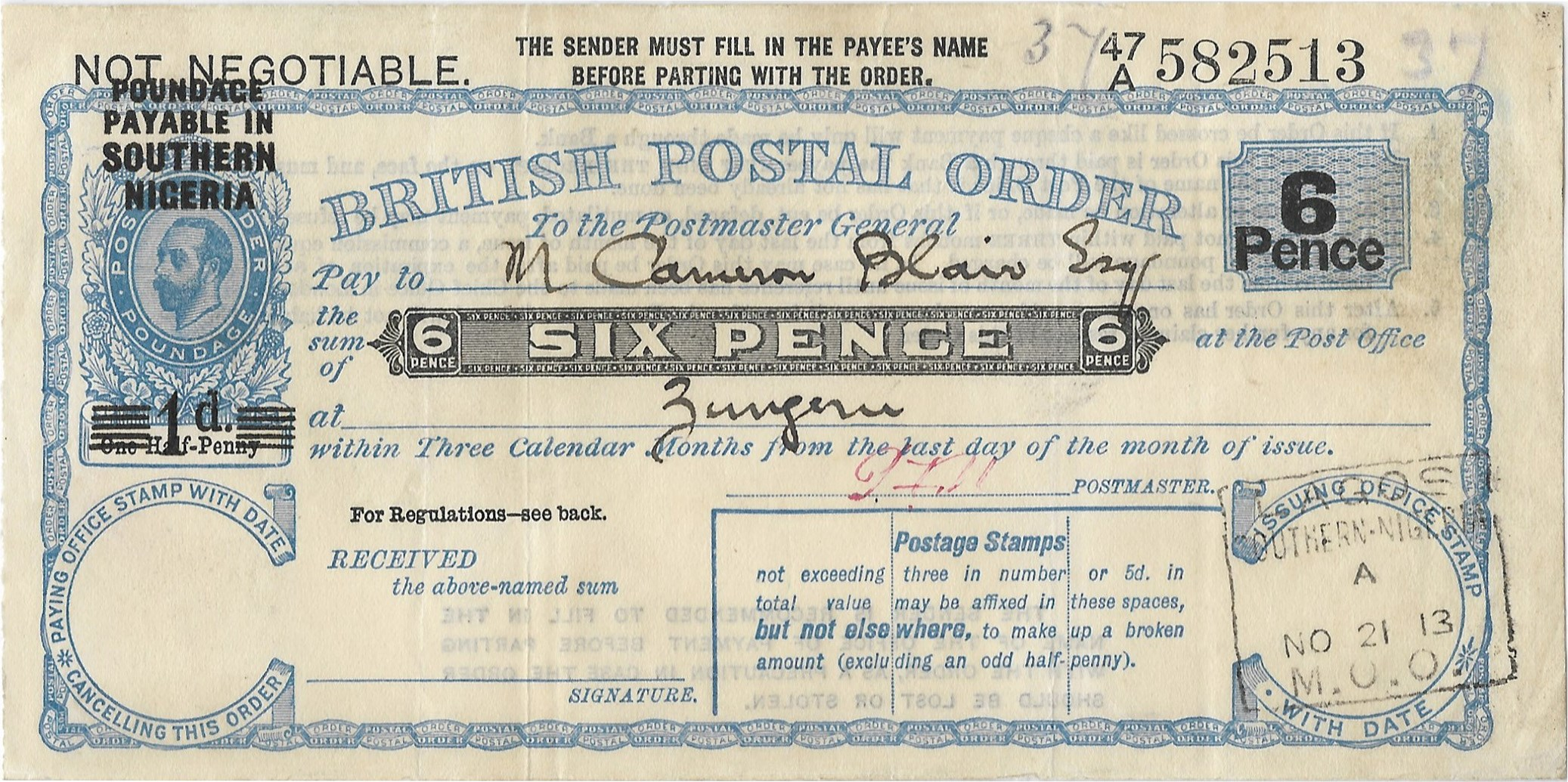
A British postal order overprinted for use in Southern Nigeria

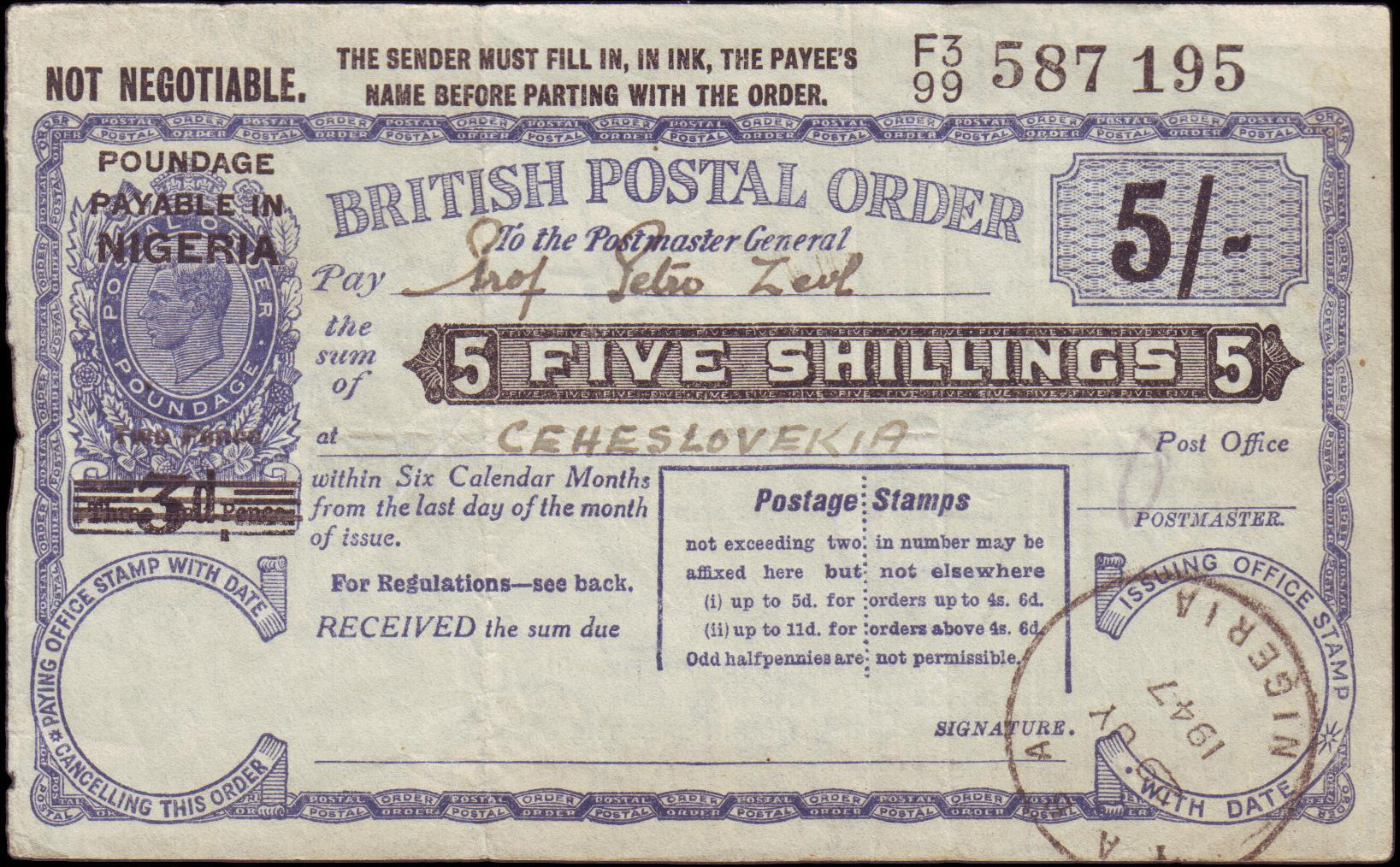
Five-shilling British postal order overprinted for use in Nigeria used in 1947 - 3d additional poundage to be paid in Nigeria

The first postal orders of Nigeria were issued by the British colonial authorities. Later, Nigeria issued its own postal orders, first in £, s, d, and then in the new currency of the Naira. In 2018, the postal order system was replaced by a cheaper money order system.

== Nigerian-issued British postal orders ==
British postal orders began being issued and encashed in Nigeria from 1907, being issued with separate overprints of Northern and Southern Nigeria, but none are known to survive from the north and only four from Southern Nigeria.

== Nigerian postal orders ==
2 Naira Nigerian postal order of 1987

Nigeria became independent from Britain on 1 October 1960 and after then began to issue postal orders in its own right denominated in Nigerian pounds, shillings, and pence, although records at the British Library indicate that these were at first supplied by Britain's Crown Agents. A number of proof Nigerian postal orders dated 1964 and 1965 are contained in the Crown Agents Archive of the British Library Philatelic Collection. New postal orders were issued in 1973, when Nigeria changed over to the decimal currency of the Naira.

In 1987, Nipost was charged with providing postal order services within Nigeria under Act No. 18 of that year. In late 2018, Nipost replaced the disused postal order service with a domestic electronic Money Order whose commission is less than the postal orders and can be obtained at any post office or sub-post office enabling rural and urban communities to transfer money easily. The domestic service supplements the international version.
