= Perfin =

Stamp with a name perforated across it

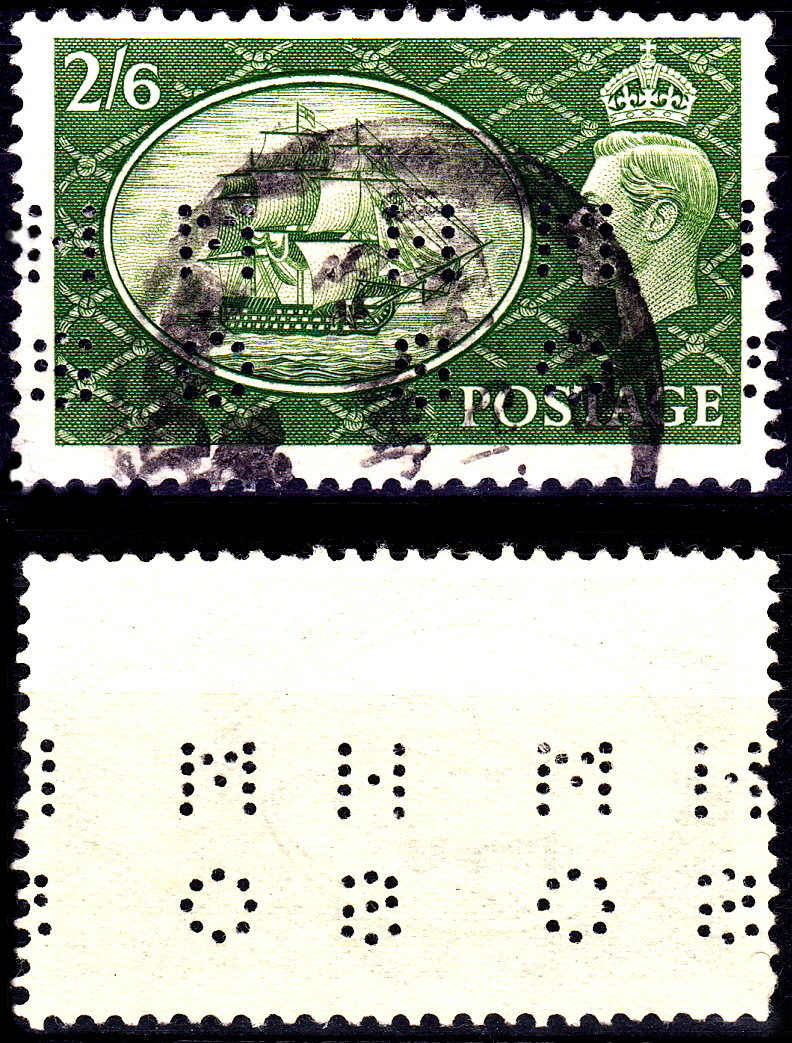
A 1951 perfin stamp of the UK (used by HMSO) showing front (top) and reverse (bottom)

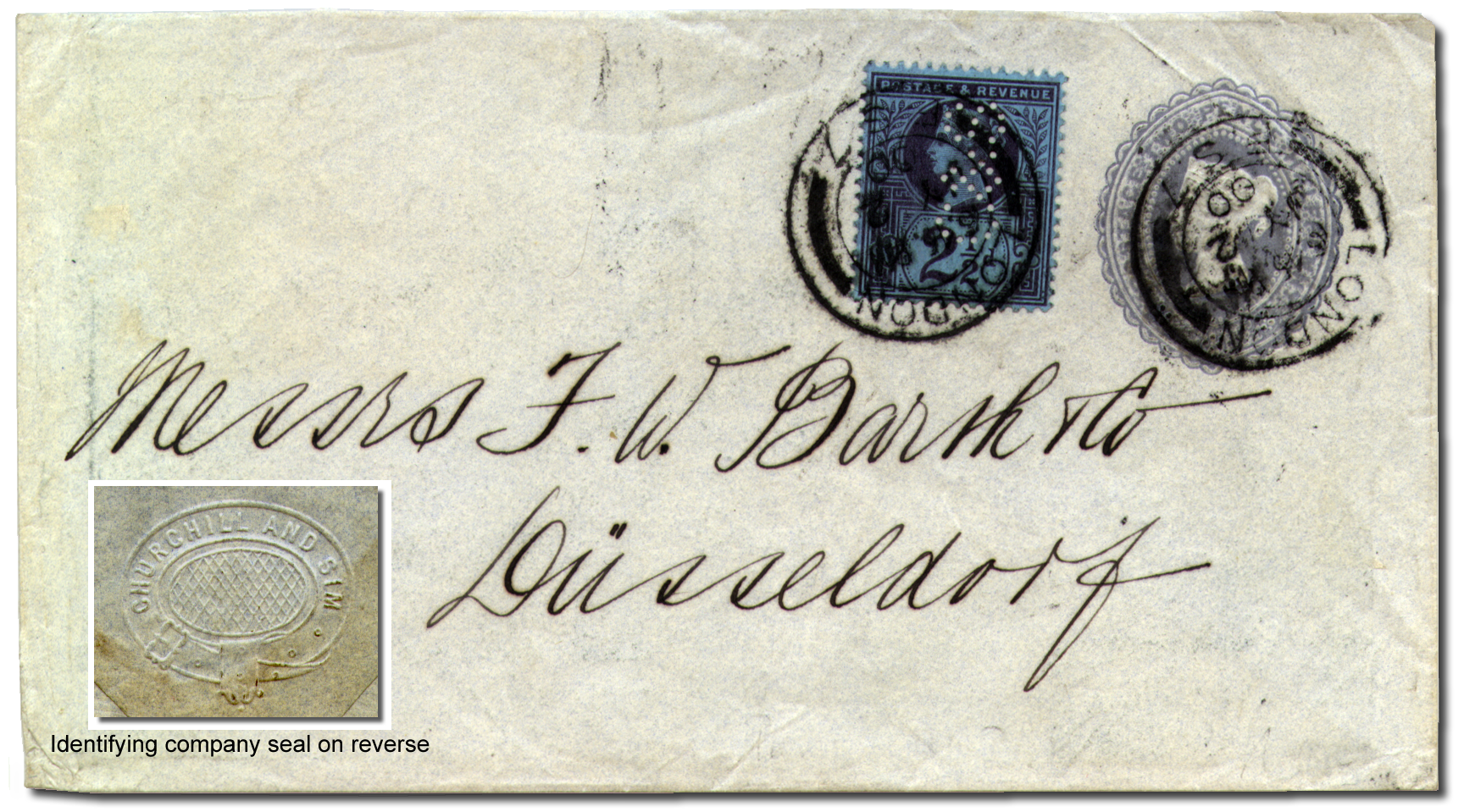
A postal stationery envelope used from London to Düsseldorf in 1900, with additional postage stamp perfinned "C & S" identifying the user as "Churchill & Sim" per the seal on the reverse shown on inset

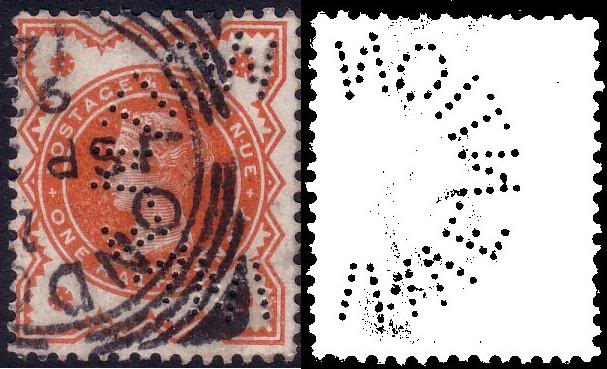
An unusual curved perfin INVENTION from Patent Agents G.F. Redfern & Co. of London, whose telegraphic address was also INVENTION

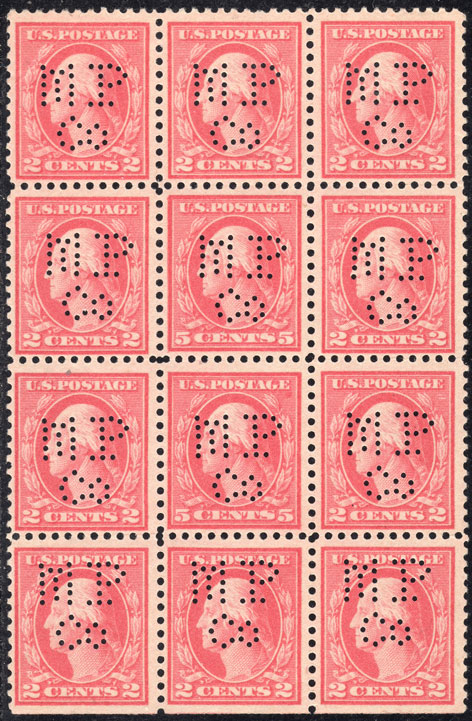
A large block of United States perfin stamps

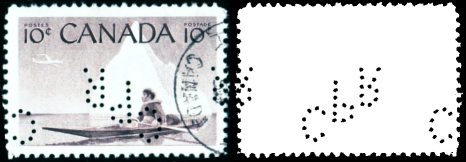
A 1955 Canadian stamp with a CPR (Canadian Pacific Railway) perfin

In philately, a perfin is a stamp that has had initials or a name perforated across it to discourage theft. The name is a contraction of "perforated initials" or "perforated insignia". They are also sometimes called SPIFS ("stamps perforated with initials of firms and societies").

== History ==
Great Britain was the first country to use perfins, beginning in 1868. The practice spread quickly to Belgium (1872); Denmark, France, Germany and Switzerland (1876); and Austria (1877); the U.S. finally allowed perfins in 1908.

In Britain unused postage stamps could be redeemed for cash at the post office. By agreement with postal authorities, a perfin stamp on a letter could be used only by the owner of the perfin. Therefore, a stolen perforated stamp would be of no value to the unauthorized bearer. Thus the use of perfins gave organizations better security over their postage. The demise of the perfin came about by the widespread use of postage meter machines which obviated the need for perfins.

== Officially prepared perfins ==
A number of countries have perforated stamps to denote official mail. Denmark punctured stamps for use by the Danish Home Guard. The United States has punctured stamps for use by various Federal organisations and Australian states such as Victoria and Queensland used perfins widely on their stamps.

== Collecting perfins ==
Formerly considered damaged and not worth collecting, perforated postage stamps are now highly sought after by specialist collectors. It is often difficult to identify the originating uses of individual perfins because there are usually no identifying features; for instance the Kodak company used a simple K as their perfin, but on its own a stamp perforated K could have been used by several other users. A K perfin still affixed to a cover that has some company identifying feature, like the company name, address, or even a postmark or cancellation of a town where the company had offices, enhances such a perfin. Note that the block of 12 stamps illustrated on the right includes two copies of the highly sought-after erroneous 5-cent denomination instead of 2 cents.

== Postal stationery ==
In addition to stamps, postal stationery envelopes, postcards, and newspaper wrappers were perfinned.

== Perfinned postal orders ==
Perfinned British postal orders were used to pay out winning bets on the football pools and these postal orders are very sought after by collectors.

== Specimen stamps ==
Specimen stamps have often been perfinned with the word specimen to denote their status.

== Reply coupons ==
International reply coupons have been issued by the Channel Island of Jersey in which the country is identified by the letters 'JE' perfinned into the coupon.

== Clubs ==
- German Perfin Association - In German
- The Perfins Club - United States based perfin society
- The Perfin Society - Great Britain based perfin society
