= Rodney Bennett (disambiguation) =

Rodney Bennett (1935–2017) was a British television director.

Rodney Bennett may also refer to:

- Rodney Bennett (1890–1948), aka Royden Barrie, British playwright and children's author
- Rodney M. Bennett (1934–2019), British broadcaster and writer
- Richard Rodney Bennett (1936–2012), British composer
- Rodney D. Bennett (born 1966), American university administrator
