= Adebayo Adewusi =

Nigerian academic and public administrator

Adebayo Ismail Adewusi
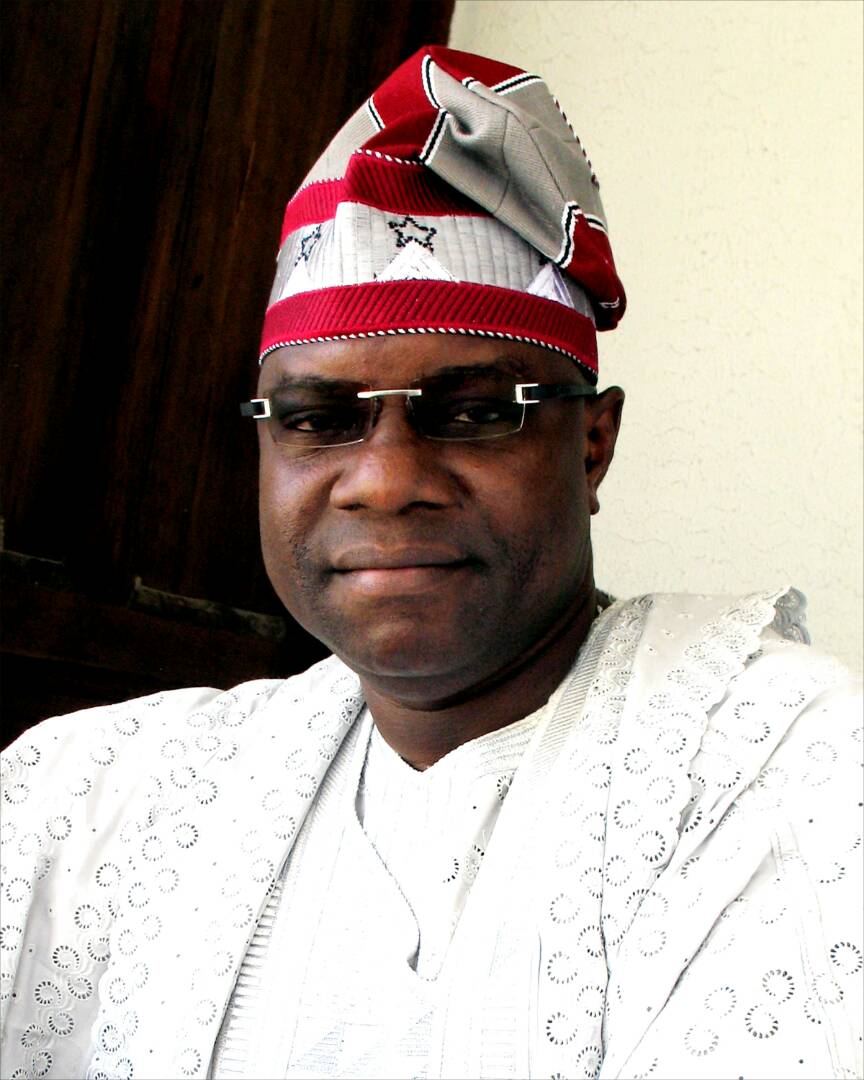
- Adebayo Adewusi

Former Nigeria Postmaster General
- In office December 2019 – October 2022
- Preceded by: Barrister Bisi Adegbuyi
- Succeeded by: Adepoju Adeyemi

Personal details
- Born: May 20, 1958 (age 68) Eruwa
- Education: University of Lagos; Keio University.
- Occupation: Public servant; Academic; Lawyer

Adebayo Ismail Adewusi (born May 20, 1958) is a Nigerian academic, lawyer, public administrator, politician and twice a former Commissioner in Lagos state. He was appointed commissioner for Finance between the year 2004 to 2006 and later as commissioner for Budget and Planning. He was also a governorship aspirant in Oyo State, Nigeria. In December 2019, Adewusi succeeded Barrister Bisi Adegbuyi as the Postmaster General and CEO of Nigerian Postal Service (NIPOST) by the administration of President Muhammadu Buhari He was later replaced by the incumbent Tola Odeyemi in October 2023 by the administration of President Bola Tinubu

== Early life and education ==
Adewusi hails from Eruwa in Ibarapa East Local Government Area of Oyo State. He was born on May 20, 1958, to the family of Pa Kareem Babatunde Adewusi and Madam Faderera Asabi Adewusi, in Anko Eruwa. His father who was a peasant farmer and traditional drummer. He attended Baptist Secondary Modern School in Eruwa and earned his West African School Certificate at the Technical College, lle-Ife, Osun State. He studied Computer Science at The Polytechnic, Ibadan before proceeding to the University of Ife and graduated with a First Class Honours in Economics. He also had his M.Sc. from the same university. In 1993, He obtained his PhD in International Monetary Economics from the Keio University in Tokyo, as a Monbusho Scholar. He also had a LLB degree from the University of Lagos in 2000.

== Career ==
Adewusi started his career as an Assistant Lecturer at the Obafemi Awolowo University after his Master's degree before proceeding for his PhD in Japan. After his doctorate, he worked at Lead Merchant Bank Limited between 1994 and 2000. He also served as Managing Director /CEO of Ibile Holdings Ltd. (an Investment Company owned by the Government of Lagos State) from 2000 to 2004. He was the Commissioner for Finance, Budget and Economic Planning in Lagos State between 2004 and 2006. He was also the chairman of Wemabod, a company established by the Western Regional Government led by the late Chief Obafemi Awolowo to provide accommodation in Lagos. He was a member of the APC in Oyo State in May 2018.

== Projects ==
=== Nigerian Postcode Ecosystem and Infrastructure ===
The Nigerian Postcode Ecosystem and Infrastructure is a project consummated by Nigerian Post Service in partnership with the National Space Research and Development Agency (NASRDA) to enhance postal service delivery in the country. The project infused the newly created standard postcode by NIPOST and the use of satellite imagery of high dimension through the national mapping network from NASRDA. Adewusi led NIPOST to the signing of the Memorandum of Understanding for the execution of the project in Nigeria.
