= Nigeria Postmaster General =

Chief executive of the Nigeria Postal Service

- Incumbent; Tola Odeyemi since October, 2023.
- Nigerian Postal Service
- Style: Postmaster General
- Status: Chief executive
- Member of: Governing council of Nigeria Postal Service
- Appointer: Board of Governors
- Term length: No fixed term
- Formation: 1852
- First holder: T.N. Ike

The Nigeria Postmaster General (PMG) is the chief executive officer of the Nigerian Postal Service (NIPOST). The PMG is responsible for managing and directing the day-to-day operations of the agency.

The PMG is selected and appointed by the Governing Council of the Nigeria Postal Service, the members of which are appointed by the President of Nigeria, with the advice and consent of the Nigeria Senate. The Postmaster General then also sits on the board as a member. The PMG can be dismissed by the Board of Governors.

The current officeholder is Tola Odeyemi, who was appointed in October 2023.

== List of postmasters general ==
	Name	Tenure	President(s) served under
1	Elder T.N. Ike	1985 - 1988	Buhari, Babangida
2	Nathaniel Zome	May 1989 - Jan. 1994	Babangida, Abacha
3	J.O Bamigbele	Jan 1994 - Dec 1995	Abacha
4	Engr. B.T. Olukolu	Dec. 1995 - Dec 1999	Abacha, Abubakar
5	Abubakar Musa Argungu OON	Dec. 1999 - Oct. 2005	Obasanjo, Yar'Adua
6	Mal. Ibrahim Mori Baba	Feb. 2006 - Aug. 2015	Yar'Adua, Jonathan
7	Arc. Enoch Adeyeye	August 2015 - March 2016	Buhari
8	Dr. Richard Balami	March 2016 - July 2016	Buhari
9	Barr. Bisi Adegbuyi	Aug. 2016 - Dec. 2019	Buhari
10	Dr. Adebayo Adewusi	Dec. 2019 – Oct. 2023	Buhari
11	Adepoju Adeyemi	Oct. 2022– Oct. 2023	Buhari
12	Ms. Tola Odeyemi	Oct. 2023–Present	Bola Ahmed Tinubu
