= South African Postal Union Convention =

1897 postal treaty

The South African Postal Union Convention was signed during 1897, and came into effect on 1 January 1898.

The intention of the Convention was to allow the payment of postal orders between the Cape of Good Hope, Natal, the Orange Free State, and the South African Republic. The paying entity was required to repatriate the postal orders back to the issuing British colony or Boer republics.

The Convention lapsed in late 1899, due to the outbreak of the Second Boer War. The postal orders that were supposed to have been returned to the issuing entities were put into storage. Upon the capture of the Orange Free State and the South African Republic during 1900 by the British, the paid postal orders were looted and souvenired. The Cape of Good Hope postal orders and the Natal postal orders that bear postmark datestamps of post offices in the Orange Free State and the South African Republic with dates during September 1899 and later are extremely sought after by collectors, as are Orange Free State postal orders and South African Republic postal orders bearing postmark datestamps of post offices in the Cape of Good Hope and Natal.

== See also ==
- Postal Orders of the Orange Free State
- Postal Orders of the South African Republic
