= Adewusi =

- Gender: Male
- Language: Yoruba

Origin
- Origin: Yorubaland
- Meaning: Royalty is influential.
- Region of origin: Yorubaland [Nigeria, Benin, Togo]

Adéwùsì audio is a surname of Yoruba origin, typically bestowed upon males which means "Royalty multiplies/is influential". The name Adéwùsì, sometimes, spelt and pronounced 'Adéùsì, is the Family name of a royal stock in Ijebu-Ode in Ogun State, Nigeria.

== Notable people with the surname include ==
- Shola Adewusi (born 1963), British actress of stage, screen, and radio
- Sunday Adewusi (1936–2016), Nigerian policeman and Inspector General of Police
- Adebayo Adewusi (born 1958), Nigerian academic, lawyer, public administrator and politician.
- Kola Adewusi, Nigerian politician.
