= Official mail =

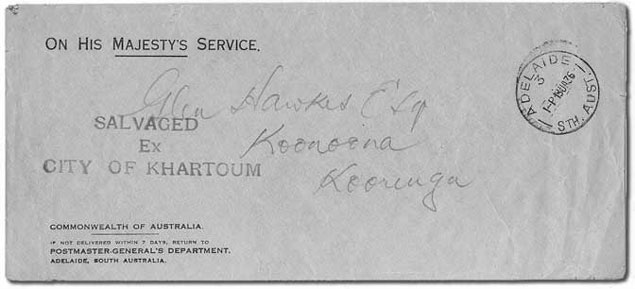
Australian official mail crash cover salvaged from the 1935 Imperial Airways "City of Khartoum" aircraft crash at Alexandria during an England to Australia flight.

Official mail is mail sent from, or by, an authorized department of government, governmental agency or international organization and normally has some indication that it is official; a certifying cachet, return address or other means of identity, indicating its user. In some countries, postage stamps have been issued specifically for official mail.

Official stamps were intended for the same purpose as regular postage stamps except that they were unavailable for purchase at post offices. While most stamps are denominated some have no value imprint.

== History ==
Some of the earliest official mail were the messages sent by kings, emperors and other rulers. The Cursus publicus was the official mail courier (and transportation) system created by the Roman Emperor, Augustus. Much later, one of the functions of the Thurn-und-Taxis-Post postal system was to carry the mail of Emperor Maximilian I in the Holy Roman Empire.

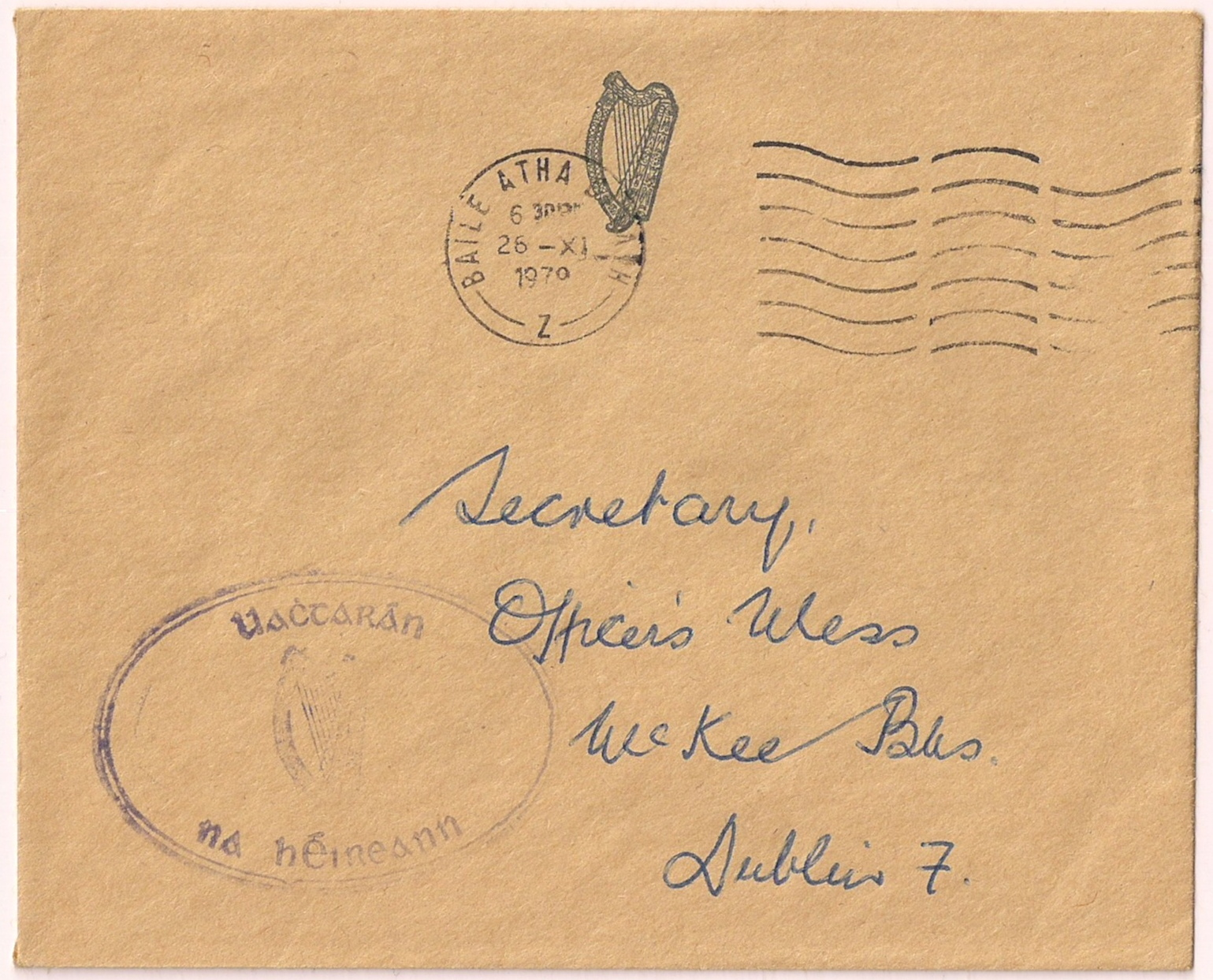
Official mail from the President of Ireland (Patrick Hillery) with the oval certifying handstamp Uaċtarán na hÉireann used in 1979 in addition to the pre-printed harp indicia envelope

Official mail stamps are related to the end of franking privilege that granted certain elected officials of a government the privilege to send mail for free. The person usually signed their name on the mail but it was a highly abused system. In the UK the rules were changed requiring the sender to indicate the date and place of mailing in addition to their signature, but this too was abused and this led, in part, to the introduction of postage stamps.

Most governments use envelopes with an indicia indicating its official status; the United Kingdom's official mail most often shows, O.H.M.S. or On His/Her Majesty's Service, the United States uses the silhouette of an eagle, Ethiopia shows a hand holding a cleft stick with a letter is wedged into it, while Ireland uses a harp.

After the civil war, the United States Post Office Department had a large deficit and according to the Postmaster General's 1869 report 31,933 had the franking privilege at an estimated cost of $5 million, so in 1872 the Republican party included a proposal to eliminate the free frank as part of their election platform. Between 1873 and 1891, there was no free franking in the USA because special official mail stamps had been issued, but by 1891 free franking had been restored.

== Official mail stamps ==
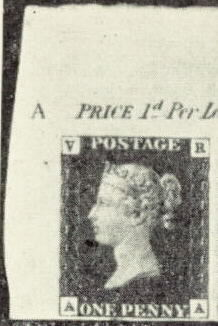
VR official postage stamp issued in 1840

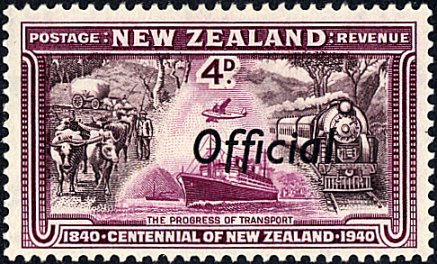
1940 New Zealand official overprint

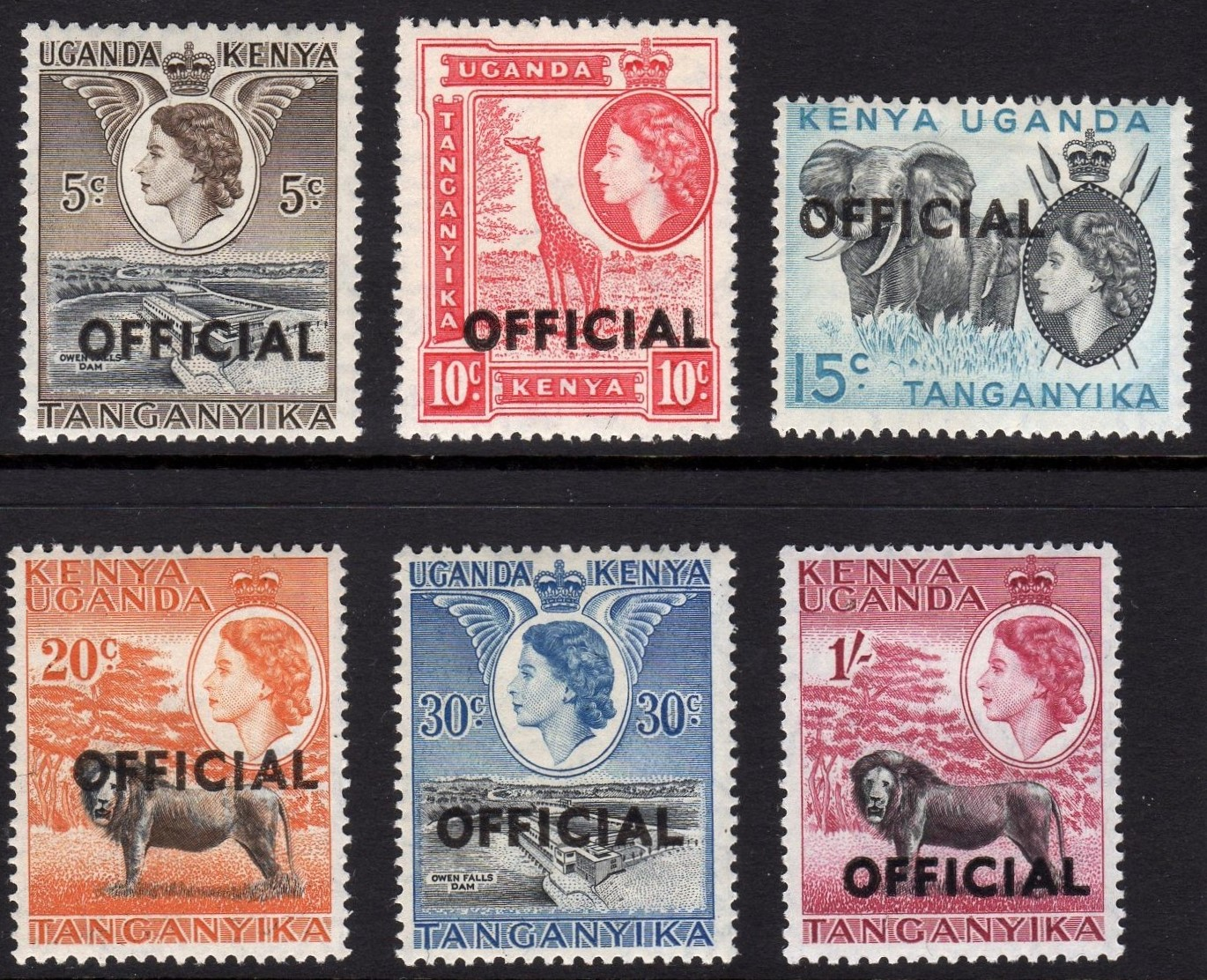
Official stamps of Kenya, Uganda and Tanganyika, 1959.

=== In Great Britain ===
The first official mail postage stamp, known as the VR official, was issued by the United Kingdom at the same time as the Penny Black and Two Pence Blue. The VR Official utilised the same design as the Penny Black except that the stars in the top corners were removed and replaced by the letters V and R that gives the stamp its common name. On May 7, 1840, W.L. Maberly, Secretary to the British post office, sent a notice to all postmasters to which was affixed a pair of VR specimens as well as a pair of two Penny Blues. The notice charged the postmasters to note the letters in the upper corners of the stamp that was to be: applied to the correspondence of Public Departments, and other Persons formerly enjoying the privilege of Official Franking.

=== In the United States ===
Legislation passed by the United States Congress on March 3, 1873, stated that: "the Postmaster General shall cause to be prepared a special stamp or stamped envelope, to be used only for official mail matter for each of the executive departments", to this end, the official stamps were issued on July 1, 1873, for the Executive Branch and the departments of Agriculture, the Interior, Justice, Navy, Post Office, Treasury and War following the ending of the franking privilege though the stamps were only in use for seven years mainly due to the need for departmental postage accountability. The Post Office also printed official stamped envelopes for their own use.

In March 1877, stamps became unnecessary due to a congressional act allowing government departments to use their own envelopes endorsed "Official Business". Private use of these envelopes incurred a $300 fine. Official stamps were officially discontinued on June 30, 1879, but they remained in use until supplies were exhausted. The stamps and envelopes were finally abolished on July 5, 1884, however, for a four-year period between 1910 and 1914 official stamps were used for the postal savings program.

The first US stamps to have the words "Official Mail" printed on them were issued on January 12, 1983, when the departmental postage accountability again became a concern. The Great Seal of the United States became the central design on these 20¢ stamps and envelopes. A 32¢ stamp and envelope superseded the 20¢ issue in 1995.

=== Elsewhere ===
Several countries, such as, Australia, Canada, New South Wales, New Zealand and Niue, have issued official stamps that can often be identified because they bear the words like, "official", "service", "dienstmark", or the initials "O.S." (Official service) or OHMS (On Her/His Majesty's Service) in the design, as an overprint, or a perfin. Even Tibet had official postage stamps around 1950.
