= Postal orders of Hong Kong =

Postal orders were issued in Hong Kong at various times when it was still a British colony.

== Hong Kong inland postal orders ==
These are known to have been issued during the 1890s, but the dates of when they began to be issued and ceased to be issued is not yet known, as information about these issues are extremely sketchy.

== Hong Kong-issued British postal orders ==
It is not yet known when these began to be issued in the local post offices, but the last day of issue has been confirmed as 31 December 1993.

== BFPO-issued postal orders ==
It is not yet known when these began to be issued at the BFPO, Hong Kong, but the last day of issue for these has been confirmed as 20 May 1997. These issues are extremely sought after by collectors, as Hong Kong was still a part of the Commonwealth when these were issued.
