= Promotional postal order =

A promotional postal order (PPO) is a special type of postal order that is issued in the United Kingdom by various companies in conjunction with the Royal Mail to promote their goods and services. These have been issued at various times since the 1970s.

== List of companies known to have issued PPOs ==
- Cinzano
- Smash
- Nescafé
- Typhoo
- Reader's Digest
- Maxwell House
- Bounce (fabric softener)
- Swan
- Brooke Bond Teas
- Persil
- Kleenex
- Post Marketing Surveillance Unit
- Berkeley
- Philips
- Boehringer
- Tango
- General Guarantee
- Fife Council (These are the only Scots postal orders.)
- Uplands
- Argos

== See also ==
- Postal orders of the United Kingdom
