= Postal orders of Ireland =

Postal orders were issued in Ireland from 1881 until they were discontinued in late 2001 just before the change over to the Euro. The current alternative is the An Post Postal Money Order which serves an equivalent purpose.

== Layout ==
The denomination is stated in numerals at the right-hand side and also written across the centre panel. The issuing post office postmark is added in the bottom right while the cashing post office cancel is applied at the bottom left. The poundage is printed in the 'POSTAL ORDER POUNDAGE' panel, at the left side. When the poundage has been increased the current fee is stated in writing.

== Irish issues of British postal orders ==
The first postal orders to be issued in Ireland were British postal orders issued on 1 January 1881. At this time, Ireland was part of the United Kingdom of Great Britain and Ireland. This lasted until 1922.

== The first Irish postal orders ==
The first Irish postal orders was a transitional series overprinted on British postal orders. The Irish inscription 'POST ÓRDÚ ÉIREANN' ('Irish postal order') was overprinted on the inscription 'BRITISH POSTAL ORDER'. This series caused a bit of a stir, as the portrait of King George V was not overprinted. These were issued from 4 April 1922.

== The second series of Irish postal orders ==
These were also overprinted British postal orders, but the King's portrait was overprinted with this inscription 'RIALTAS SEALADACH NA H-ÉIREANN' ('Provisional Government of Ireland') in four lines. The issue of these began in May 1922.

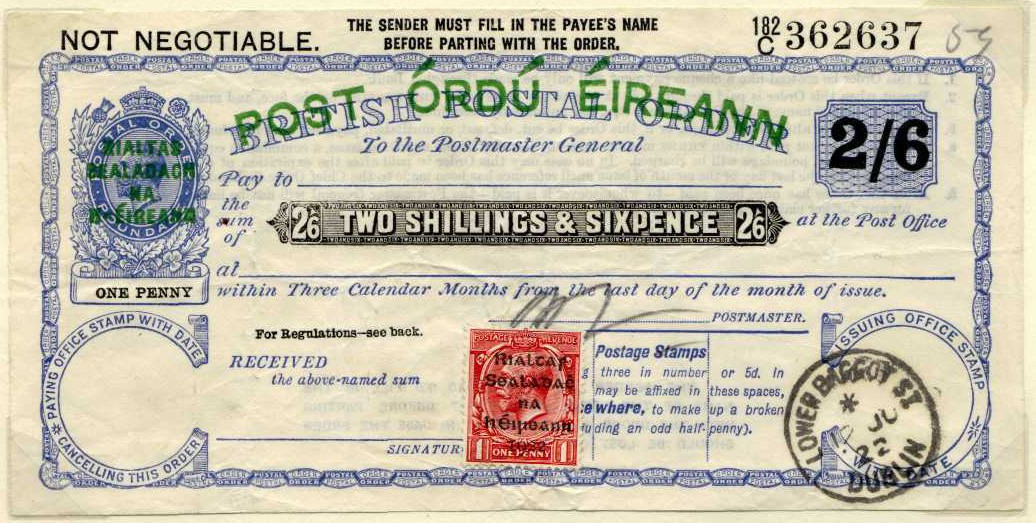
Provisional Government of Ireland postal order issued in Lower Baggot Street, Dublin with additional overprinted postage stamp

== The third series of Irish postal orders ==
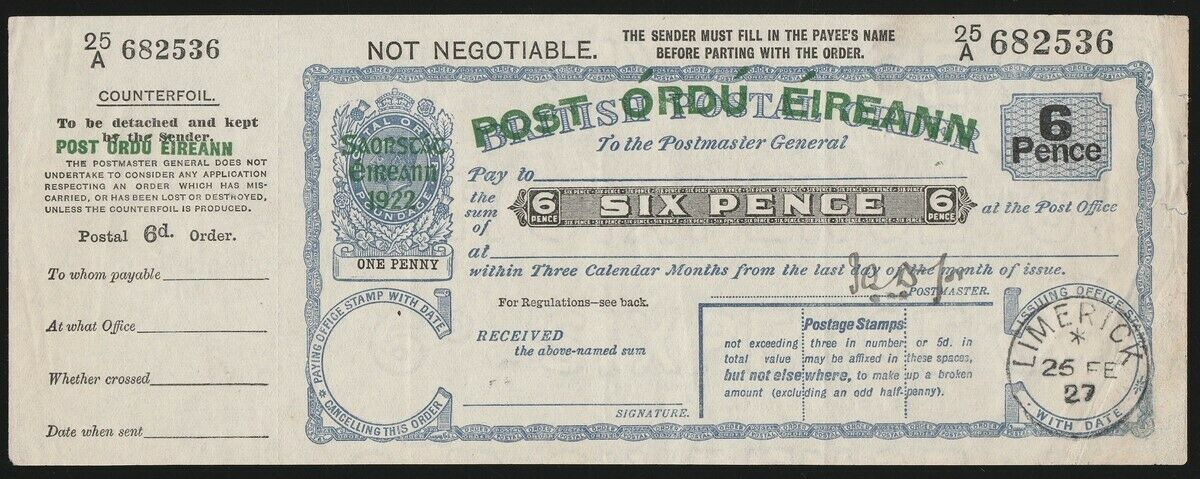
Government of Ireland postal order issued in Limerick in 1927

Like the first two series, this series was also a series of overprinted British postal orders. The overprinted inscription on the King's portrait was changed to 'SAORSTÁT ÉIREANN 1922' ('Irish Free State 1922'). The issue of this series began in January 1924 and ended in January 1928.

== The first native Irish Free State postal orders ==
The issue of the first native Irish Free State postal orders began in September 1927. The design of these included a harp surrounded by the inscription 'SAORSTÁT ÉIREANN' inside a box giving the poundage in both Irish and English. The field of the postal orders was bilingually inscribed in Irish and English. The words 'not negotiable' were rendered in Irish as 'NEAMH-IONAISTRITHE' (the dialect that this comes from is not known). The back of the postal orders contained the regulations in both Irish and English. 'Irish postal order' was expressed as 'Órdú Puist Éireannach'.

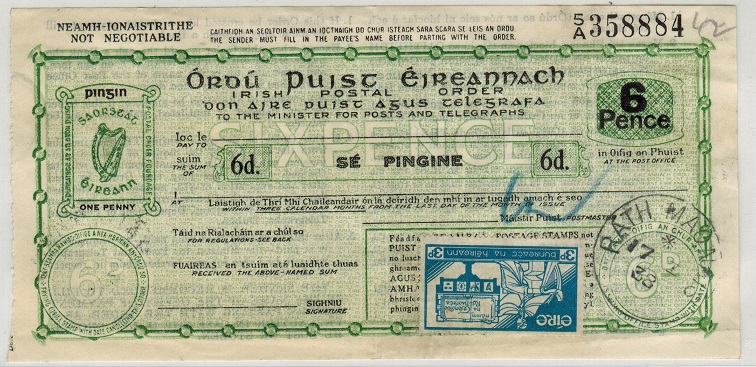
1938 use with country name inscription 'SAORSTÁT ÉIREANN'

== Postal orders of the Irish Free State ==
These were of the same design, but the 'SAORSTÁT ÉIREANN' inscription was replaced by 'ÉIRE' below the harp in the poundage box.

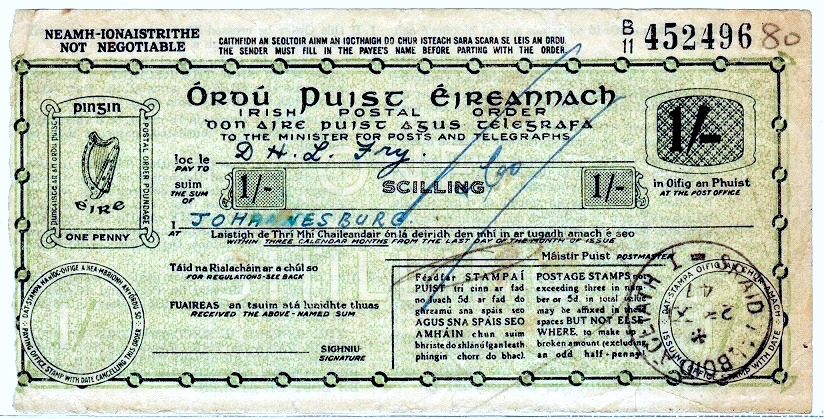
1941 issued postal order with 'NEAMH-IONAISTRITHE'

== Early pre-decimal postal orders of the Republic of Ireland ==
These were of the same design as the Irish Free State ones, but the Irish for 'not negotiable' was changed to 'DO-SHANNTA'. From this issue, the Irish for 'Irish postal order' was changed to 'Ordú Poist Éireannach'.

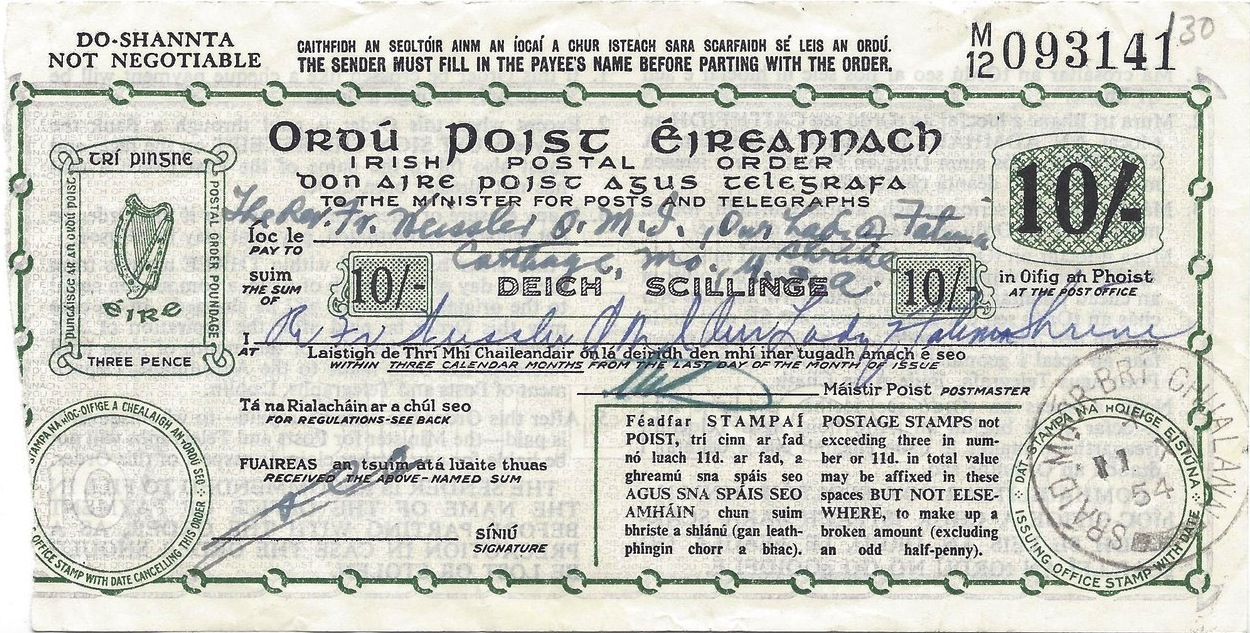
1954 issued postal order with 'DO-SHANNTA'

== Later pre-decimal postal orders of the Republic of Ireland ==
These were of the same design as the early pre-decimal republican ones, but the Irish for 'not negotiable' was changed again to read as 'DOSHANNTA'.

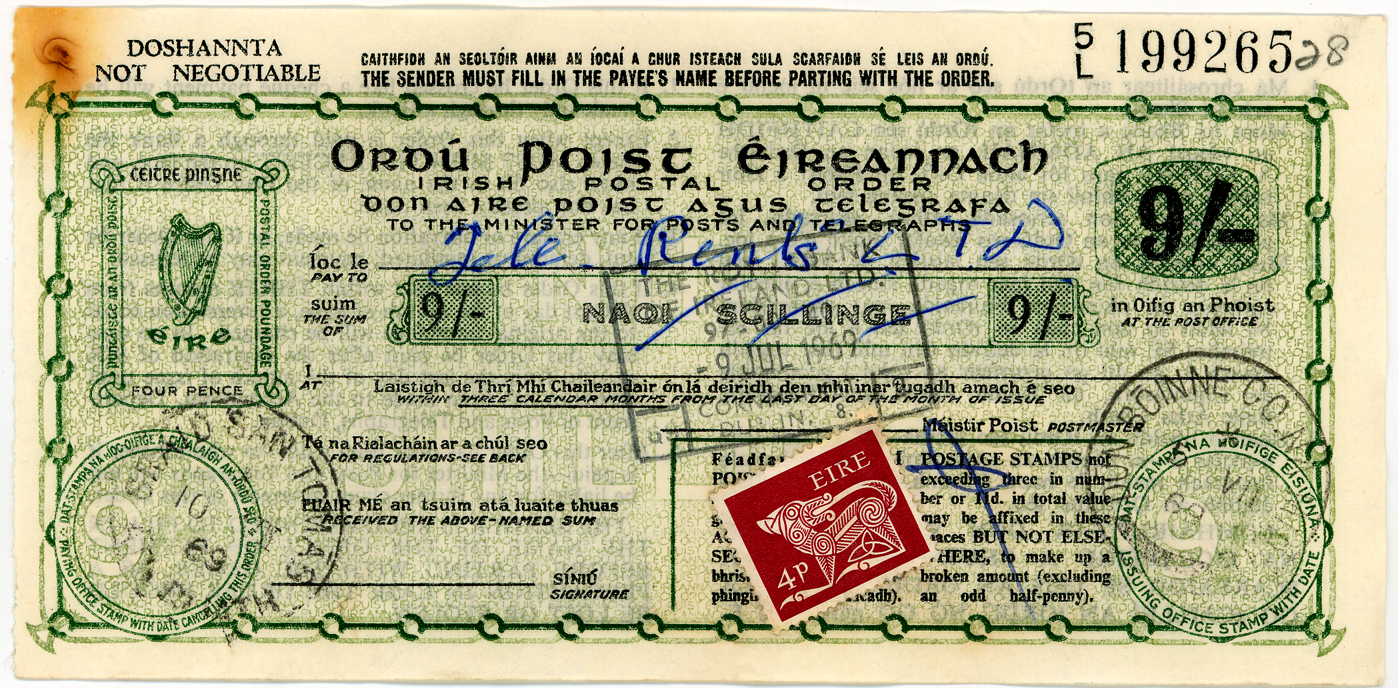
Irish 9 shilling postal order with additional postage stamp used in 1969. Used postal orders are seldom seen because most were destroyed when they were redeemed or cashed at a post office or bank.

== Pre-decimal postal orders issued just prior to the decimal change over ==
A batch of 2/6 postal orders was printed in 1965–69 with the old Órdú Puist Éireannach and 'NEAMH-IONAISTRITHE' inscriptions, which had ceased to be issued in the early 1950s. These are very sought after by postal order collectors in both Ireland and overseas. These were issued in several post offices in different parts of Ireland.

== 1st issue of decimal postal orders ==
Because Ireland decimalised the currency from the old currency of £.s.d. to the new currency of £.p. on the same day as in Great Britain (15 February 1971), a new issue of postal orders was necessary. The harp design of the pre-decimal issue was retained, but the values were expressed in £.p.

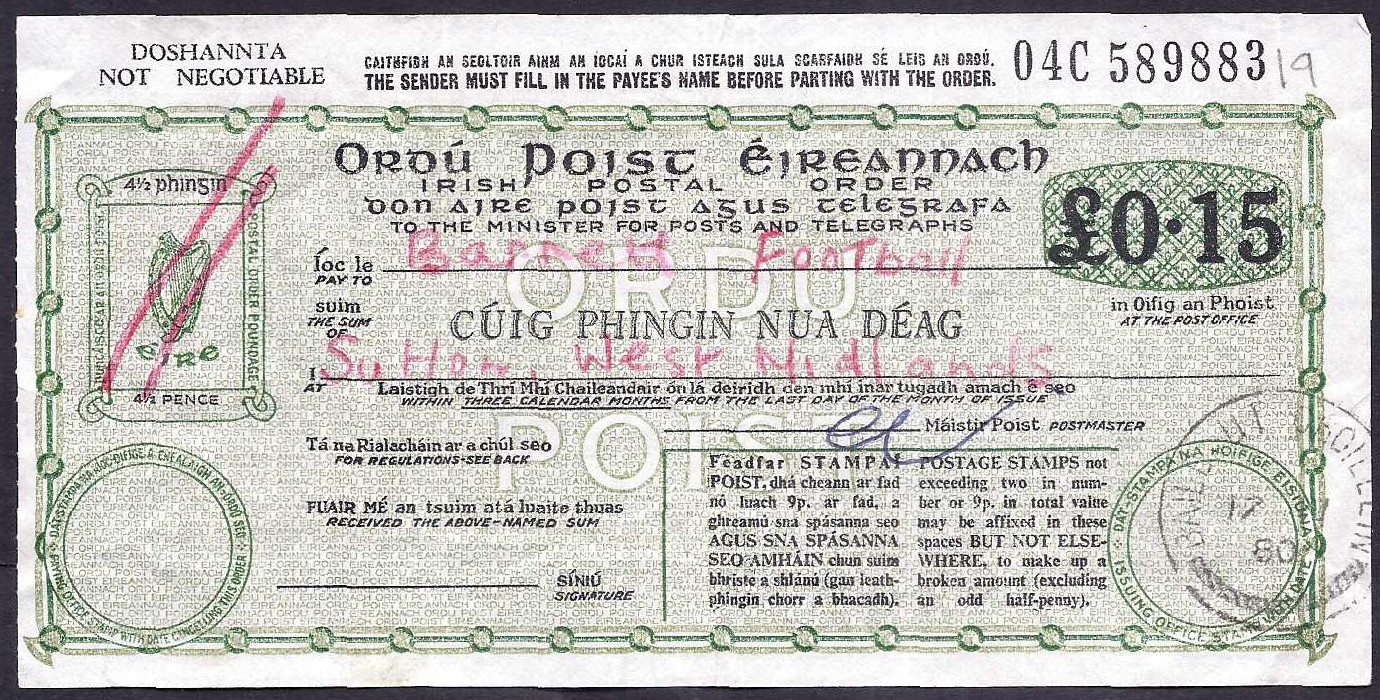
1980 use of postal order 1st decimal issue denominated 15p (decimal currency at right) but the poundage of 4 1/2 pence (pre-decimal currency at left) has been excised.

However, when Ireland joined the European Monetary System from 13 March 1979 it was no longer possible to cash Irish postal orders in the United Kingdom and visa-versa as had been the case, because the currencies were no longer at parity and the British post office did not do currency work.

== 2nd issue of decimal postal orders ==
In 1986–87, an entirely new series of postal orders was issued. These bear Celtic designs, which are derived from designs in the Book of Kells. There was a noticeable white margin adjacent to the counterfoil. The denominations were expressed in IR£. There was a total of eighteen denominations issued in this series, which ranged from 20p up to £50. The poundage started at 30p on the 20p postal order, which resulted in the 20p. postal order being withdrawn from issue within six months of the series being issued. The 20p postal order in this series is also a scarce one. The designs include a building at the bottom. The names of post offices and county names in English printed on the postal orders appeared for the first time.

== The controversial postal orders of 1992–93 ==
These were the same design as the previous series, but the white margin disappeared, and the denominations were expressed as £ instead of IR£, which led to a storm of protest from the Royal Mail, because it imitated the British Pound sign.

== The introduction of high-value postal orders ==
In 1993–94, £70 and £100 postal orders were introduced. These have been seldom seen.

== The final issue ==
The final series of postal orders began on 27 and 28 August 1997 with the same Celtic design format with a building at the bottom. The denominations are expressed with the value in bold black numerals and words on both the building and at left adjacent to the counterfoil below the post office and county names.

== The official last day of issue ==
In April and May 2001, it was reported that the issue of Irish postal orders was to end just before the change over to the Euro. A date in July 2001 was planned for their withdrawal, then 1 October 2001 and 18 October 2001, but nothing happened. On 31 October 2001, An Post began to withdraw postal orders from all the sub-post offices.

== Unofficial last days of issue ==
The large post offices and head post offices continued to issue postal orders for around two or three weeks after 31 October 2001. This was due to a dispute between An Post and the Post & Telegraph Union of Ireland. So the unofficial last days of issue are between 1 and 22 November 2001. Postal orders issued in this period are sought after by collectors.
