= Postal orders of the Orange Free State =

Postal orders of the Orange Free State were introduced on 1 January 1898. They came in a range of denominations from 1 Shilling to 1 Pond. The Orange Free State's postal orders were known in Dutch spelling - 'ORANJE VRIJ STAAT', which also appears in the watermark.

Issued postal orders do not come with counterfoils, as the counterfoils were kept by the post office for recording purposes. Any postal orders that still have a counterfoil attached are remainders from books, which were souvenired during the Second Boer War. These are of interest to collectors of the Postal Orders.

== Orange Free State currency issues ==
The Orange Free State and the South African Republic were the first countries in the world to declare postal orders to be legal tender as an emergency currency. At this time, it is currently difficult to distinguish between the currency issues and the normal postal notes.

== Cashed postal notes ==
The most common postal notes that turn up are the ones that have been cashed within the Orange Free State prior to 1 September 1899. The Orange Free State's postal notes were allowed to be paid in the South African Republic and in the two British colonies (Cape of Good Hope and Natal) as well. The postal notes and postal orders of the other three entities were also allowed to be paid in the Orange Free State under the terms of the South African Postal Union Convention (which came into effect on 1 January 1898), but the postal notes and the postal orders had to be repatriated back to the issuing entity after being cashed.

== Popularity of the Orange Free State postal notes ==
The Orange Free State's postal notes are very popular with banknote collectors, and in fact, some denominations are listed in the Pick Specialised Catalogue as banknotes, but it is noted there that the paid postal notes are worth half the listed catalogue value.

The two most common denominations that turn up are the 1/- and the 5/- postal notes. A postal note that has been paid in the Cape of Good Hope has a 1d. red postage stamp stuck to the back and cancelled with the paying post office's datestamp in addition to the datestamp being applied to the correct area on the face of the postal order. These are regarded by collectors of the postal orders of the Commonwealth of Nations as being worth slightly more than the same item paid within the Orange Free State. It also depends on both the place of issue and the place of encashment.

The most difficult of the postal notes to get is the 1 Pond, as there would have been far fewer of the 1 Pond postal notes sold than any other denomination.

== Denomination chart ==
Catalogue number. Denomination. Commissie Loon. Colour.

PS681. 1 Shilling. 1 Penny. Green.

PS682. 1 Shillings and Sixpence. 1 Penny.

PS683. 5 Shillings.

PS684. 7 Shillings and Sixpence.

PS685. 10 Shillings.

PS686. 12 Shillings and Sixpence.

PS687. 15 Shillings.

PS688. 17 Shillings and Sixpence.

PS689. 1 Pond. 3 Pence. Olive-Green.

== Catalogue Reference ==
Standard Catalog of World Paper Money. Volume 1. Specialized issues 9th Edition. By Albert Pick. Edited by Neil Shafer and George S. Cuhaj. 2002. ISBN 0-87349-466-0
