= Rodney M. Bennett =

British music journalist (1934–2019)

Rodney Martin Dumaresq Bennett (1934 – 10 May 2019) was a British broadcaster, writer, and local politician. He came from naval background; his father, Geoffrey Bennett, was a novelist and naval historian (he used the middle initial to avoid confusion with namesakes).

== Early life ==
Educated at Hoe Place and Allhallows Schools, after national service in the Royal Navy where he spent a year in south and west Africa, he obtained a trainee post with the BBC. In twelve years he worked as a studio manager, announcer, and scriptwriter in Singapore and a producer in the Archives and African services. He then spent two years as Senior English Producer in Ethiopia with the Lutheran church international Radio ETLF and a year in the African English service of West German overseas broadcasting.

== Career ==
Throughout the 1980s, Bennett freelanced for BBC, in particular on the BBC World Service, and published a book "The Archer-Shees Against the Admiralty" which was a factual account of the Archer-Shee case upon which Terence Rattigan based his play The Winslow Boy. His research unearthed the original five-shilling postal order which caused the problem. He also contributed many articles to the classical magazine Music and Musicians. Then in the 1980s he was a reporter for the London commercial news station LBC, mainly of the flagship breakfast-time 'AM' programme.

Interested in politics, he joined the Young Conservatives in 1960 and two years later was elected to Kensington Borough Council from Brompton Ward. In 1964, after the reorganisation of London local government, he was elected as a member of Royal Borough of Kensington and Chelsea Council for Pembridge Ward. He resigned his seat on 5 April 1967 when he went abroad.

Though Conservative he was also an active trade unionist, and served as Secretary of the Central London programme branch on the Association of Broadcasting Staff which looked after programme staff in the Broadcasting House area. When freelance, he was Chairman of the Association's freelance division, where he campaigned vigorously against the BBC's practice of withholding contacts until after a programme had been broadcast. In retirement, he was secretary of the union BECTU's History project and given life membership of this union. Arising from this he was active in the Conservative Trade Unionist movement and was Chairman of the London Area for several years in the 1990s.

After retirement in 1990, Bennett moved to Richmond, London and became active in local politics, serving on Richmond upon Thames Council 2002–2010 as Conservative councillor for South Richmond ward. He took a special interest in planning. Always a staunch eurosceptic, he was active in the Campaign for a British Referendum over the Maastricht Treaty in 1993.

== Personal life and death ==
A passionate opera lover, Bennett had a significant collection of operatic memorabilia, some items from the 18th century. He died from complications of a stroke in Kingston upon Thames, on 10 May 2019.
