= Tola Odeyemi =

Nigeria Postmaster General

Omotola Odeyemi

11th Post Master General of Nigeria

Nigeria Postmaster General, Nigeria Postal Service
- Incumbent
- Assumed office October 2023
- Preceded by: Adeyemi Adepoju

Personal details
- Education: George Washington University; Morgan State University.
- Occupation: Engineer, public policy, government regulations
- Profession: Public administrator
- Website: http://www.nipost.gov.ng/

Omotola Odeyemi (born July 31, 1980) is a Nigerian engineer, public administrator and Postmaster General & chief executive officer of the Nigerian Postal Service (NIPOST). In October 2023, she was appointed head of the postal agency by the administration of President Bola Tinubu following the sack of Adeyemi Adepoju.

Odeyemi served as a two-time special assistant to the former Lagos State Governor, Akinwumi Ambode, between 2016 and 2019.

== Early life and education ==
Odeyemi was born in Ibadan, Oyo State, Nigeria, on June 31, 1980. She attended Adesoye College in Offa, Kwara State. She studied Electrical Engineering at the Morgan State University before proceeding to the George Washington University where she obtained a master's degree in Systems Engineering.

== Career ==
During the early days of her career, Odeyemi worked with the Lagos State Environmental Fund as an executive secretary. Between 2016 and 2019, she was appointed as a senior special assistant to the Lagos State Governor at the time, Akinwumi Ambode.

In August 2019, she joined ride-hailing company, Uber, as Head of Public Policy.

Until her appointment by the President Tinubu administration, she was Head of Government Affairs (Sub-saharan Africa) at Binance (a cryptocurrency exchange company).

=== NIPOST appointment controversy ===
On October 11, 2023, President Tinubu sacked former NIPOST CEO Adeyemi Adepoju and appointed Tola Odeyemi as the new Postmaster General/CEO of NIPOST.

However, the official X (formerly Twitter) account of NIPOST posted that Adepoju had been reinstated, accompanying it with a signed press statement. This caused confusion and a protest broke out at the agency's headquarters in Abuja.

== Personal life ==
Odeyemi was born in Ibadan, Oyo State, Nigeria.
