= Postal orders of the South African Republic =

Postal money orders in South Africa

The South African Republic's postal orders were introduced on 1 January 1898, which was also the date that the South African Postal Union Convention came into effect.

The postal orders are inscribed in Dutch.

Issued postal orders do not have counterfoils attached, as the counterfoils were kept by the post office for recording purposes. Any postal orders with counterfoils still attached are from books souvenired after the post office was captured during the Second Boer War.

== Denomination Chart ==
Catalogue number	Denomination	Commissie	Colour
PS701	1 Shilling	1 Penny	Black
---	1 Shilling and Sixpence	1 Penny	Bright Blue
PS702	2 Shillings and Sixpence	1 Penny	Bistre-brown
PS703	5 Shillings	1 Penny	Olive-green
PS704	7 Shillings and Sixpence	2 Pence	Yellow-orange
PS705	10 Shillings	2 Pence	Turquoise-blue
PS706	12 Shillings and Sixpence	3 Pence	Brown-red
PS707	15 Shillings	3 Pence	Deep blue
PS708	17 Shillings and Sixpence	3 Pence	Red-orange
PS709	20 Shillings	3 Pence	Reddish-purple

== Currency issues (1900) ==
The South African Republic was the first country, along with the Orange Free State, to declare postal orders to be legal tender as an emergency currency. All denominations, except the 1/6, were allowed to circulate. This was done to save on both paper and labour.
