= The Winslow Boy =

1946 play by Terence Rattigan

First edition (publ. Hamish Hamilton)

The Winslow Boy is an English play from 1946 by Terence Rattigan based on an incident involving George Archer-Shee in the Edwardian era. The incident took place at the Royal Naval College, Osborne.

== Background ==
Set against the strict codes of conduct and manners of the age, The Winslow Boy is based on a father's fight to clear his son's name after the boy is expelled from Osborne Naval College for allegedly stealing a five-shilling postal order. To clear the boy's name was imperative for the family's honour; had they not done so, they would have been shunned by their peers and society. Similarly, the boy's life would have been wrecked by an indelible stain on his character which would have followed him throughout adulthood.

The play was inspired by an actual event, which set a legal precedent: the case of Stonyhurst College alumnus George Archer-Shee, a cadet at Osborne in 1908, who was accused of stealing a postal order from a fellow cadet. His elder brother, Major Martin Archer-Shee, was convinced of his innocence and persuaded his father (also called Martin) to engage lawyers. The most respected barrister of the day, Sir Edward Carson, was also persuaded of his innocence and insisted on the case coming to court. On the fourth day of the trial, the Solicitor General, Sir Rufus Isaacs, accepted that Archer-Shee was innocent, and ultimately the family was paid compensation.

== Plot ==
Ronnie Winslow, a fourteen-year-old cadet at the Royal Naval College, is accused of the theft of a five-shilling postal order. An internal inquiry, conducted without notice to his family and without the benefit of representation finds him guilty, and his father, Arthur Winslow, is "requested to withdraw" his son from the college (the formula of the day for expulsion). Arthur Winslow believes Ronnie's claim of innocence and, with the help of his suffragette daughter Catherine and his friend and family solicitor Desmond Curry, launches a concerted effort to clear Ronnie's name. This is no small matter, as, under English law, Admiralty decisions were official acts of the government, which could not be sued without its consent—traditionally expressed by the attorney general responding to a petition of right with the formula "Let Right be done".

The Winslows succeed in engaging the most highly sought-after barrister in England at the time, Sir Robert Morton, known also as a shrewd opposition Member of Parliament. Catherine had expected Sir Robert to decline the case, or at best to treat it as a political football; instead, he is coolly matter-of-fact about having been persuaded of Ronnie's innocence by his responses to questioning (in fact, a form of cross-examination, to see how young Ronnie would hold up in court) in the presence of his family, and is shown mustering his political forces in the House of Commons on the Winslows' behalf with little concern for the cost to his faction. Catherine remains unconvinced of Sir Robert's sincerity, perhaps not least because of his record of opposition to the cause of women's suffrage, but also due to his dispassionate manner in the midst of the Winslow family's financial sacrifices.

The government is strongly disinclined to allow the case to proceed, claiming that it is a distraction from pressing Admiralty business; but in the face of public sympathy garnered through Winslow and Catherine's efforts, and of Sir Robert's impassioned speech on the verge of defeat in the Commons, the government yields, and the case is allowed to come to court. At trial, Sir Robert (working together with Desmond Curry and his firm) is able to discredit much of the supposed evidence. The Admiralty, embarrassed and no longer confident of Ronnie's guilt, abruptly withdraws all charges against him, proclaiming him entirely innocent.

Although the family has won the case at law and lifted the cloud over Ronnie, it has taken its toll on the rest. His father's physical health has deteriorated under the strain, as to some degree has the happiness of the Winslows' home. The costs of the suit and the publicity campaign have eaten up his older brother Dickie's Oxford tuition, and hence his chance at a career in the civil service, as well as Catherine's marriage settlement. Her fiancé John Watherstone has broken off the engagement in the face of opposition from his father (an Army Colonel), forcing her to consider a sincere and well-intentioned offer of marriage from Desmond, whom she does not love. Sir Robert, on his part, has declined appointment as Lord Chief Justice rather than drop the case. The play ends with a suggestion that romance may yet blossom between Sir Robert and Catherine, who acknowledges that she has misjudged him all along. The last couplet of the dialogue ("How little you know women, Sir Robert" and "How little you know men, Miss Winslow") seems to bolster this implication.

=== Differences between reality and fiction ===
In the play, Rattigan quotes from actual parliamentary debates and court transcripts but makes major changes to the characters and the timing of events.

In the play, it was the accused boy's father who first believed in his innocence; in fact, it was an older brother, Martin, who persuaded their father, and used his influence as an MP to involve Carson in the case.

Martin Archer-Shee junior was a very different character from the failed university student, Dickie Winslow, of the play. He was a Conservative Member of Parliament from 1910, and in his mid-thirties at the time of the case. Arthur Winslow was also made less prosperous than his factual counterpart.

Although Archer-Shee did have a sister, she did not have much in common with Catherine Winslow in the play, a suffragette and, as we learn in the final lines of the play, a potential future politician. To some extent then, Rattigan has reversed the character and roles of the brother and sister. Also, her erstwhile fiancé, John Watherstone, and Desmond Curry, a solicitor who eventually proposes to Catherine, appear to be fictional.

Whilst the play gives only indirect reference to the court case and the parliamentary debates, the 1948 film introduces scenes from these events that are not in the play.

Rattigan also moved the events closer to the start of World War I, though the conflict is remote from the characters. In fact, both George and Martin Archer-Shee fought in the First World War; Martin commanded an infantry battalion, and George who had returned to Stonyhurst College after the trial, was killed, at the age of 19, in the First Battle of Ypres. His name is recorded in the Stonyhurst War Record; inscribed on the war memorial in the village of Woodchester, Gloucestershire, where his parents lived; on the memorial plaque outside the Catholic St Mary on the Quay church in Bristol city centre, where he had been an altar boy; on the war memorial at the University of Roehampton, established by the Society of the Sacred Heart (George's half-sister Winefrede Archer Shee having been a religious follower of the Society); and on Tablet 35 of the Menin Gate in Ypres, as he has no known grave.

== Performance history ==
The play's London premiere in 1946 featured Emlyn Williams, Mona Washbourne, Angela Baddeley, Kathleen Harrison, Frank Cellier, Jack Watling and Clive Morton. It was under the direction of Glen Byam Shaw.

The play's Broadway premiere in 1947 featured Frank Allenby as Sir Robert, Alan Webb as Arthur Winslow, and Valerie White as Catherine Winslow.

The play was later made into a 1948 film directed by Anthony Asquith, starring Robert Donat as Sir Robert Morton KC, Sir Cedric Hardwicke as Arthur Winslow, and Margaret Leighton as Catherine Winslow. Both Mona Washbourne and Kathleen Harrison, who had been in the original theatre production, appeared.

A production starring Kenneth More as Sir Robert Morton, Lawrence Naismith as Arthur Winslow and Annette Crosbie as Catherine Winslow played from 1970 to 1971 at various theatres including the New Theatre, London.

A 1980 production at New York's Roundabout Theatre starred Remak Ramsay as Sir Robert Morton, Ralph Clanton as Arthur Winslow, and Giulia Pagano as Catherine Winslow.

A 1984 revival directed by Jeremy Sinden starring Marius Goring as Arthur Winslow and Allan Cuthbertson as Sir Robert Morton played at the Forum Theatre, Wythenshawe, the Orchard Theatre, Dartford, the Grand Opera House, Belfast, the Beck Theatre, Hayes and the Ashcroft Theatre, Croydon.

A 1994 production starring Simon Williams as Sir Robert, Peter Barkworth as Arthur Winslow, Eve Matheson as Catherine and Charles Edwards as Dickie Winslow played at the Globe Theatre, London.

A 1999 film version, directed by David Mamet, starred Nigel Hawthorne as Arthur Winslow, Jeremy Northam as Morton, and Rebecca Pidgeon as Catherine.

A 2013 production starring Peter Sullivan as Sir Robert, Henry Goodman as Arthur Winslow, Naomi Frederick as Catherine and Nick Hendrix as Dickie Winslow played at The Old Vic, London. The production transferred to Broadway later the same year, presented by Roundabout Theatre Company. The transfer starred Roger Rees as Arthur Winslow, Alessandro Nivola as Sir Robert, Mary Elizabeth Mastrantonio as Grace, Charlotte Parry as Catherine and Zachary Booth as Dickie.

A 2024 amateur production was staged at the Royal Academy of Dramatic Art.

The play has also been adapted for television by the BBC several times, including a 1949 production starring Roger Livesey as Sir Robert Morton and Jack Watling as Dickie Winslow (he had played Dickie in the 1948 film version), a 1958 production with Peter Cushing as Morton and Gwen Watford as Catherine Winslow, a 1977 production starring Alan Badel as Morton, Eric Porter as Arthur Winslow and Michele Dotrice as Catherine Winslow and a 1989 production starring Gordon Jackson as Arthur Winslow, Ian Richardson as Morton, and Emma Thompson as Catherine.

== Radio adaptations ==
The Winslow Boy was presented on the BBC Home Service Saturday Night Theatre 15 November 1947. The performance starred David Spenser, Frank Cellier, and Molly Rankin.

The Winslow Boy was presented on Theatre Guild on the Air 23 November 1952. The one-hour adaptation starred Basil Rathbone, Alan Webb, and Margaret Phillips.

A production was broadcast on the BBC Light Programme on 6 May 1953 with Dennis Arundell as Morton, Cecil Trouncer as Arthur Winslow and Angela Baddeley as Catherine Winslow.

Another BBC Home Service production was broadcast on 30 January 1965 starring Marius Goring as Sir Robert Morton, Lockwood West as Arthur Winslow and Mary Wimbush as Catherine Winslow.

A 1981 production on BBC Radio 4 featured Aubrey Woods as Morton, Michael Aldridge as Arthur Winslow, Sarah Badel as Catherine and Michael Maloney as Dickie Winslow.
