= Postal Order Society =

International numismatic and philatelic society

The Postal Order Society is a numismatic and philatelic society which was established in 1985 by Howard Lunn, who became the first chairman of the society.

== Aims ==
The main aim of the Postal Order Society is to promote the study of postal orders, postal notes, money orders and related items. The society is a member of the UK-based Association of British Philatelic Societies (ABPS) and the American Philatelic Society. Meetings are held annually in London at the IBNS venue. Very few members collect only postal orders, but usually add them to their philatelic or banknote collections. British postal orders are very popular.

== Officers and membership ==
The Postal Order Society is today administered by a chairman, treasurer and secretary. There are some overseas representatives from New Zealand, Australia and USA. There were 89 members of the society as of February 2011.

== Publications ==
The Postal Order News is published three monthly, which contains news and articles mostly submitted by members of the society. There are regular auctions of postal orders and related items. ers. Annual subscription is £15 Worldwide.

Three catalogues have been published, one on British Postal Orders, one on overprinted British Postal Orders and one on New Zealand Postal Notes.
