= George Archer-Shee =

Royal Navy cadet and British cause célèbre (1895–1914)

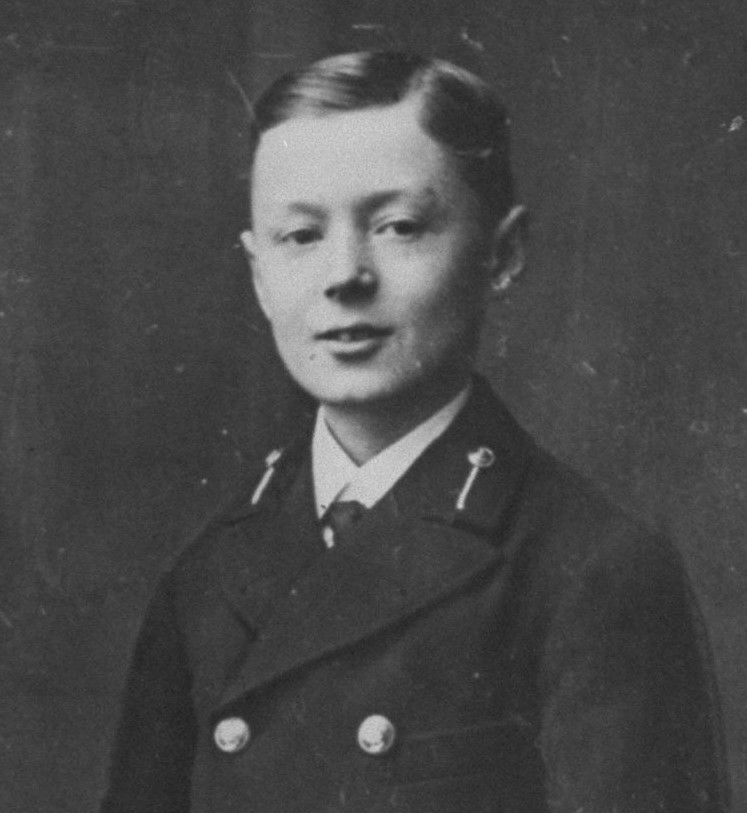
George Archer-Shee, naval cadet at the Royal Naval College, Osborne.

George Archer-Shee (6 May 1895 – 31 October 1914) was a Royal Navy cadet whose case of whether he stole a five shilling postal order was decided in the High Court of Justice in 1910. Archer-Shee was successfully defended by barrister and politician Sir Edward Carson. The trial, which became a British cause célèbre, was the inspiration for the 1946 Terence Rattigan play The Winslow Boy, which has been the basis of two films. Following his acquittal, the boy's family were paid compensation in July 1911. Archer-Shee was commissioned in the British Army in 1913, and killed aged 19, at the First Battle of Ypres on 31 October 1914.

== Family ==
George Archer-Shee was the son of Martin Archer-Shee and his second wife Helen Treloar. His father was an official at the Bank of England in Bristol and grandson of the painter Sir Martin Archer Shee. His half-brother was Martin Archer-Shee, an army officer and Member of Parliament. Actor Robert Bathurst is his great-nephew.

== Theft ==
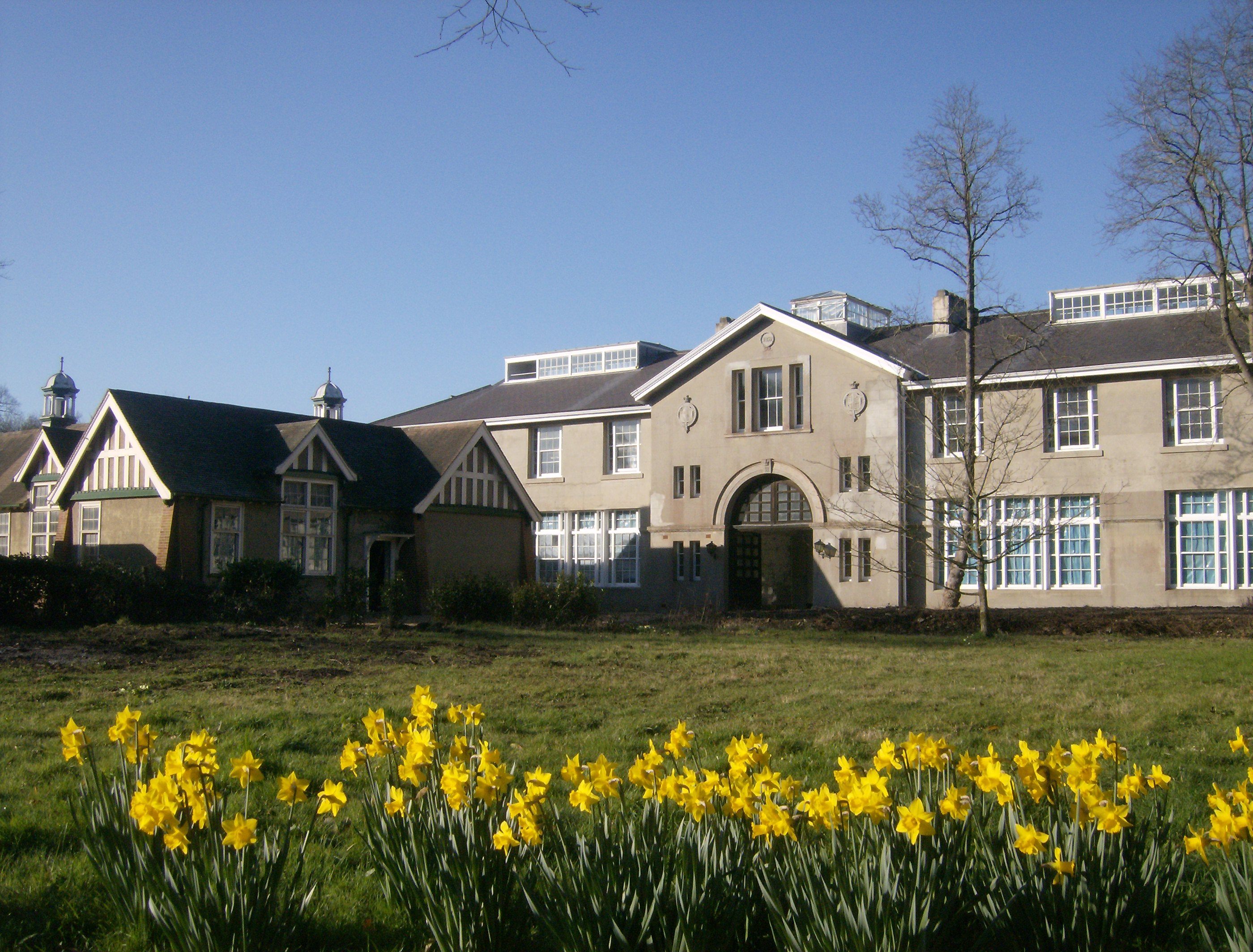
Osborne House's former stable block was the Naval College's main building.

In January 1908 Archer-Shee became a cadet at the Royal Naval College, Osborne, at Osborne House on the Isle of Wight. The college, which was part of the estate of the late Queen Victoria, educated and trained 12- to 15-year-olds in their first two years of officer training for a career in the Royal Navy. Further studies then continued at the Royal Naval College, Dartmouth, in Devon.

The theft occurred on 7 October 1908, shortly after the start of the autumn term, when a cadet named Terence Hugh Back received a postal order from a relative for five shillings. On the same afternoon, Archer-Shee had been given permission to go to a post office outside the college grounds to buy a postal order and a stamp because he wanted to buy a model train costing fifteen shillings and sixpence (15s 6d). On returning to the college, he discovered that Back had reported that his postal order had been stolen.

Miss Tucker, the elderly clerk at Osborne Post Office, was contacted. She produced Back's cashed postal order and stated that only two cadets had visited her that afternoon. However, she claimed the same cadet who had bought a postal order for 15s 6d was also the one who cashed the 5s order.

== Legal defence ==
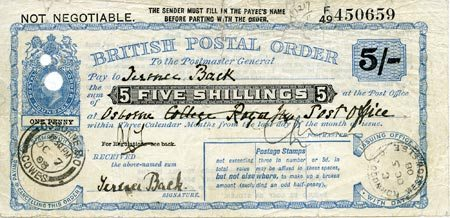
The postal order Archer-Shee was accused of cashing.

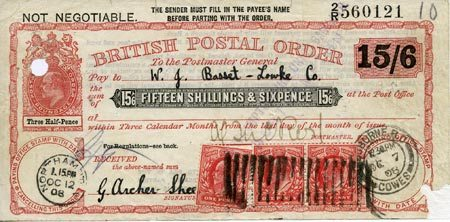
The postal order which Archer-Shee indisputably bought.

When the Admiralty wrote to Archer-Shee's father telling him that his son was being expelled for theft, his father instantly responded that "Nothing will make me believe the boy guilty of this charge, which shall be sifted by independent experts". The father's reaction reflected the family's values. They were devout Roman Catholics and the background in banking meant all the sons had been brought up to regard misuse of money as sinful.

Martin Archer-Shee contacted several lawyers to help clear his son's name. He also contacted his son Major Martin Archer-Shee, the half-brother of George, who was active in politics (in 1910 he became Member of Parliament for Finsbury Central in North London). Major Archer-Shee obtained the services of Sir Edward Carson, regarded as one of the United Kingdom's best barristers of the age, who had a son at Osborne.

== Trial and acquittal ==
Several problems prevented Carson from taking the case straight to court. Firstly as Archer-Shee was a naval cadet at the time, this excluded him from the jurisdiction of a civil court. Secondly as he was not enlisted in the Royal Navy, he was not entitled to a court-martial. In order to help his client, Carson brought a petition of right against the Crown to bring the matter before the courts.

The case eventually came to the High Court of Justice on 26 July 1910. The Solicitor-General, Sir Rufus Isaacs, appeared for the Crown and Carson, himself a former Solicitor-General, for Archer-Shee. Carson's opening remarks set the tone of the case:

A boy 13 years old has been labelled and ticketed for all his future life as a thief and a forger. Gentlemen, I protest against the injustice to a child, without communication with his parents, without his case ever being put, or an opportunity of its ever being put forward by those on his behalf. That little boy from the day that he was first charged, up to this moment, whether in the ordeal of being called in before his Commander and his Captain, or whether under the softer influences of the persuasion of his own loving parents, has never faltered in the statement that he is innocent.

Carson soon proved that the grounds on which the Admiralty had dismissed Archer-Shee were unsubstantiated. The barrister successfully proved that the elderly postmistress, Miss Tucker, could easily have been mistaken. She admitted in court that all of the cadets looked alike, conceding that in the course of dealing with one cadet and her various other tasks and duties, another boy could have entered without her noticing. The court also heard Miss Tucker was unable to identify Archer-Shee among the other cadets when given the opportunity to do so.

On the fourth day of the trial, the Solicitor-General accepted the statement that George Archer-Shee did not cash the postal order "and consequently that he is innocent of the charge. I say further, in order that there may be no misapprehension about it, that I make that statement without any reserve of any description, intending that it shall be a complete justification of the statement of the boy and the evidence he has given before the court."

== Compensation ==
Following the trial, the Archer-Shee family began to press the Admiralty to pay restitution. On 16 March 1911 the First Lord of the Admiralty, Reginald McKenna, said that he thought the House of Commons would think it inappropriate. Nevertheless, the family continued to press their claim, circulating a booklet presenting their side of the case. On 6 April, the Archer-Shee case was raised in the Commons during a Naval Estimates debate. As most MPs supported compensation, the Admiralty was forced to concede to a judicial hearing to decide the matter, otherwise the business would be "lost" (a parliamentary term meaning postponed, not dismissed, to a future day). Following the hearing, John Charles Bigham, 1st Viscount Mersey agreed the family should be paid £4,120 to cover their costs, and £3,000 compensation "in full settlement of all demands" (equivalent to £730,000 in 2025). All monies were paid in July 1911.

== Later life ==
After his expulsion as a naval cadet in 1908, Archer-Shee returned to the Roman Catholic Stonyhurst College in Lancashire, where he had been educated before going to Osborne Naval College. After completing his studies, he went to work at the Wall Street firm of Fisk & Robinson in New York. Having been a cadet sergeant in the Officers' Training Corps at Stonyhurst, he joined the British Army Special Reserve of Officers in 1913. With the outbreak of the First World War in August 1914, Archer-Shee returned to Britain and served as a lieutenant in the 3rd (Militia) Battalion of the South Staffordshire Regiment. It was the same regiment that Sir Edward Carson's nephew Francis Robinson had joined shortly before.

Archer-Shee was killed, aged 19, at the First Battle of Ypres in October 1914 while attached to the 1st Battalion, South Staffordshire Regiment. His name is inscribed on the war memorial in the village of North Woodchester in Gloucestershire, where his parents lived. His name also appears on the roll of honour of "the men of St Mary’s school and congregation" displayed on the wall at the front of the Roman Catholic church of St Mary on the Quay, Bristol. Robinson was killed four days before Archer-Shee on 27 October. Both their names are recorded on tablet 35 of the Menin Gate in Ypres, as neither has a known grave.

Terence Back, the cadet whose postal order for five shillings was taken, served in the Royal Navy in both World Wars. He was made a Commander of the Order of the British Empire in 1944 and died in 1968.

== References and sources ==
=== Sources ===
- The Archer-Shees against the Admiralty: the Story behind The Winslow Boy by Rodney M. Bennett (Robert Hale, London, 1973)
- The Archer-Shee Case by Ewen Montagu (David and Charles, Newton Abbot, 1974) ISBN 0-7153-6774-9

=== Further reading ===
- Marjoribanks, Edward (1932). Carson the Advocate. Macmillan.
- Keedy, Edwin R. (1939). A Petition of Right: Archer-Shee v. The King. Penn Law Review. Archived from the original on 8 October 2014.
