= Nigerian Postal Service =

Postal service in Nigeria

- Type: State-owned (government monopoly)
- Industry: Postal administration
- Founded: Nigeria (1987)
- Headquarters: Garki, Abuja
- Key people: Tola Odeyemi Postmaster General/CEO
- Products: EMS, e-commerce, cargo, haulage, properties, financial services
- Revenue: unknown
- Number of employees: (12,000)
- Website: Official Website

The Nigerian Postal Service, abbreviated as NIPOST, is a Nigerian government-owned and operated corporation that is responsible for providing postal services in Nigeria. It has more than 12,000 employees, and it operates more than 3,000 post offices across the country.

The Nigerian Postal Service has the following departments:

- Counter Services Division.
- Human Resources Management Division.
- Engineering and Technical Services Division.
- Finance and Investments Division.
- Business & Strategic Development Department.
- Corporate Communications Department.
- Internal Audit Department

Nigeria is a member of the Universal postal Union, West African Postal Conference.

== See also ==
- Postage stamps and postal history of Nigeria
- Postal orders of Nigeria
- Postal codes in Nigeria
- List of villages in Nigeria
- List of national postal services#Africa
