= Poundage =

English import and export duty

In English law, poundage was an ad valorem customs duty imposed on imports and exports at the rate of 1 shilling for every pound (of weight) of goods imported or exported.

Poundage was implemented in order to keep a strong naval force that would protect the Kingdom of England. The custom duty would allow the Monarch of the Kingdom to collect money that would then be spent to develop and maintain the naval force that protects the Kingdom.

Poundage was closely associated with tonnage, or tunnage, which was a duty on every tun of wine imported.

== Poundage in English history ==
The levy was introduced in 1347 under Edward III of England and was then granted by the Parliament in 1373. It continued for many years at the same rate until after the Restoration (in 1660, when the English, Scottish and Irish monarchies were all restored under King Charles II) from when Parliament set the rates according to current needs.

Moreover, Parliament voted in 1414, under Henri V of England, the right for life for every successive monarch to benefit of a royal collection on the ton and pound on imports.

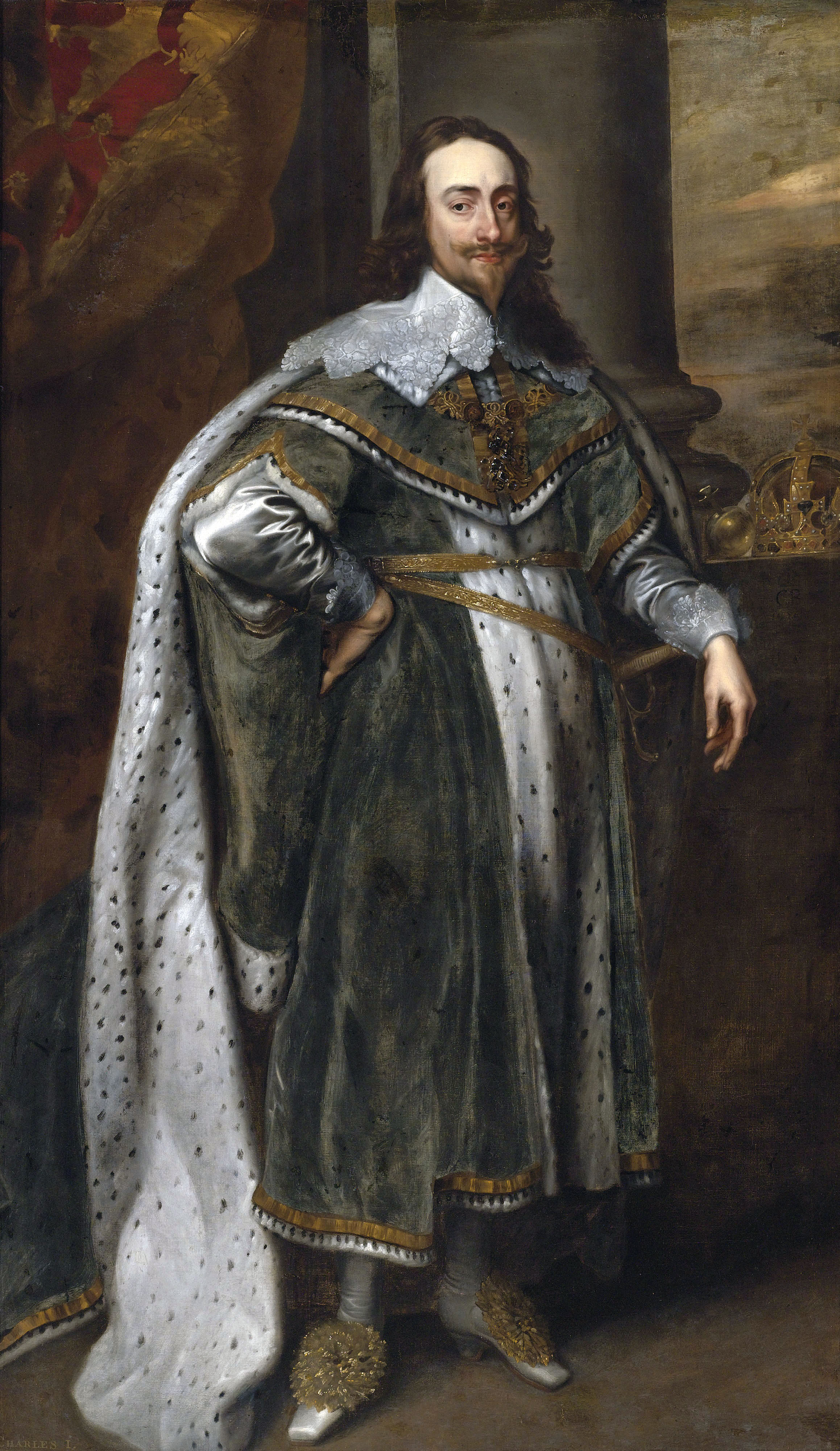
King Charles I (reign 1625–1649), portrayed from the studio of Anthony van Dyck, 1636

=== Poundage under Charles I of England ===
Under the reign of Charles I of England (1600–1649), the House of Commons voted a limitation of the royal collection to a period of one year (while the period was for life for the previous monarchs). Charles continued to collect the customs duties, even if no Parliament act was established.

In January 1629, Charles opened the second session of the Parliament of England, which had been prorogued in June 1628, with a moderate speech on the tonnage and poundage issue.

Members of the House of Commons began to voice opposition to Charles's policies in light of the case of John Rolle, a member of parliament whose goods had been confiscated for failing to pay tonnage and poundage.

On 2 March 1629, Charles I ordered a parliamentary adjournment, but when the parliament's speaker, Sir John Finch, was held by members of the Parliament in his chair in order to delay the end of the session, Charles decided to dissolve the parliament. Sir John Finch as well as nine members of Parliament were imprisoned.

==== Tonnage and Poundage Act 1640 ====
Tonnage and Poundage Act 1640
- Act of Parliament
- Parliament of England
- Long title: A subsidy granted to the King of tonnage, poundage, and other sums of money payable upon merchandize exported and imported.
- Citation: 16 Cha. 1. c. 8
- Territorial extent: England and Wales

Dates
- Royal assent: 22 June 1641
- Commencement: 3 November 1640 (Note: Start of session.)
- Repealed: 28 July 1863
Other legislation
Repealed by	Statute Law Revision Act 1863

Status: Repealed

Text of statute as originally enacted

In September 1640, following the Bishops' Wars, King Charles I issued writs summoning Parliament to convene on 3 November 1640. It was the creation of the Long Parliament, which lasted until it voted its own dissolution on 16 March 1660.

In 1641, the Tonnage and Poundage Act 1640 (16 Cha. 1. c. 8) was voted by the Long Parliament, that would regulate all the taxes in force within the kingdom, concerning consequently the current poundage imposed on imports and exports.

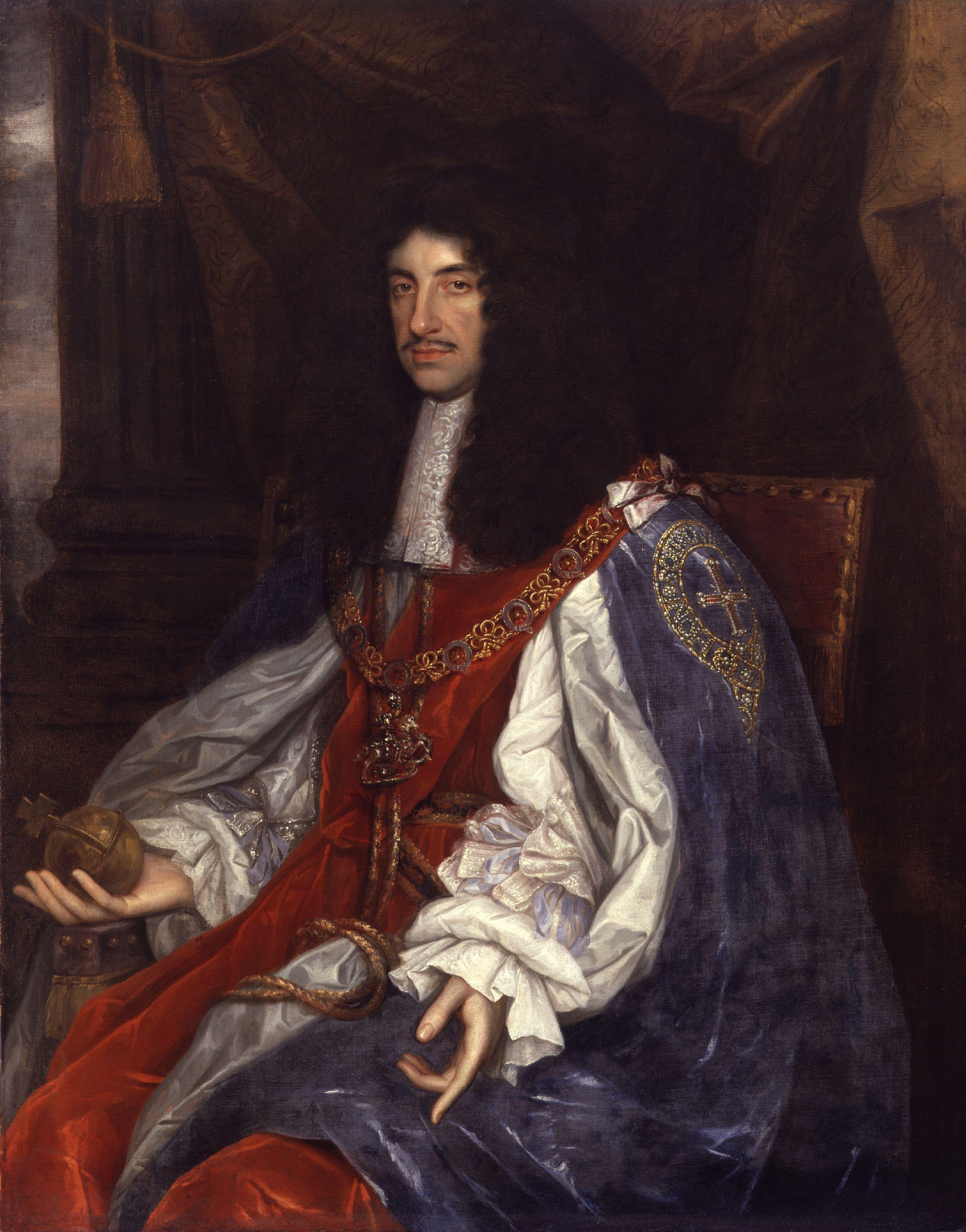
King Charles II (reign 1660–1685) in Garter robes by John Michael Wright

=== Poundage under Charles II of England ===
Under the reign of Charles II of England (1660–1685), the Convention Parliament (25 April 1660 – 29 December 1660) was founded and followed the Long Parliament that was dissolved on 16 March 1660. The Convention Parliament, which had only been in existence for eight months, re-established the right for life to collect the poundage to the monarch of England. From 1660, successive monarchs were able to collect poundage once again.

=== Abolition of poundage ===
The Customs and Excise Act 1787 (27 Geo. 3. c. 13) replaced all the customs duties, which included poundage, by a system where individual tariffs would be applied to importations. The act was divided into two parts. The first part included a statement related to the regulation of all the customs duties; the second part listed tables of duty and drawback amounts for all types of products.

A list comprising all importations and tariffs related to each import was consequently put in place.

== Poundage on postal orders ==
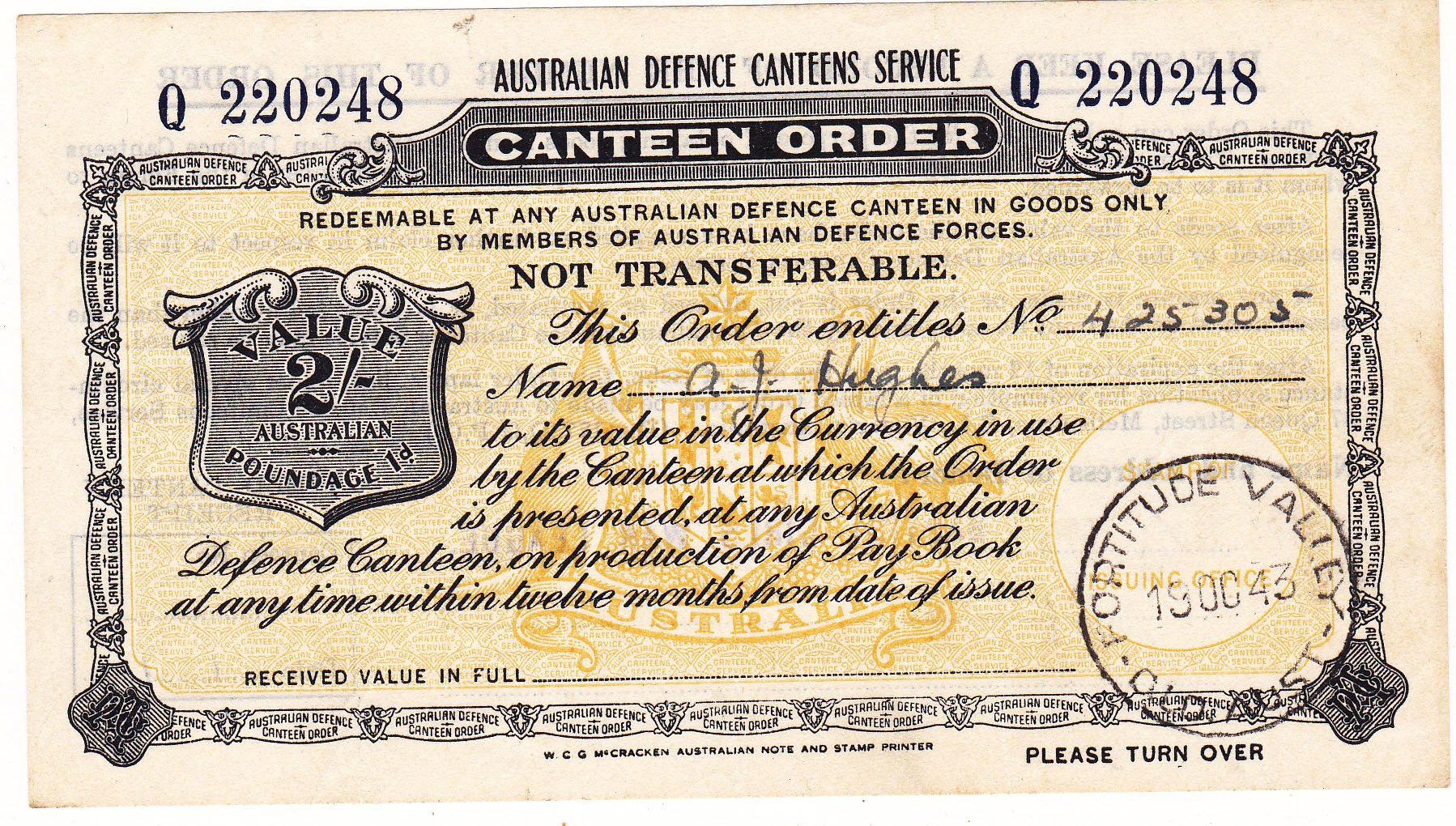
One penny poundage on a canteen order, a form of postal order

In Britain, and elsewhere, the term poundage is used for the charge imposed on the sale of a postal order.

A postal order is a financial instrument usually intended for sending money through the mail. It is purchased at a post office and is payable at another post office to the named recipient.

The poundage represents the small fee for the service that is paid by the purchaser.

== See also ==
- History of the English fiscal system
- Tonnage and Poundage
- Charles I of England
- Charles II of England
- Long Parliament
- Convention Parliament
