= Postal order =

Money transfer service provided by a postal system

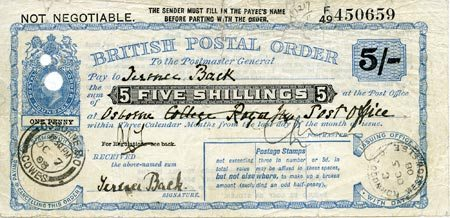
One of the most famous postal orders in history: the one alleged to have been cashed by George Archer-Shee

A postal order or postal note is a type of money order usually intended for sending money through the mail. It is purchased at a post office and is payable to the named recipient at another post office. A fee for the service, known as poundage, is paid by the purchaser. In the United States, this is known as a postal money order. Postal orders are not legal tender, but a type of promissory note, similar to a cheque.

== History ==
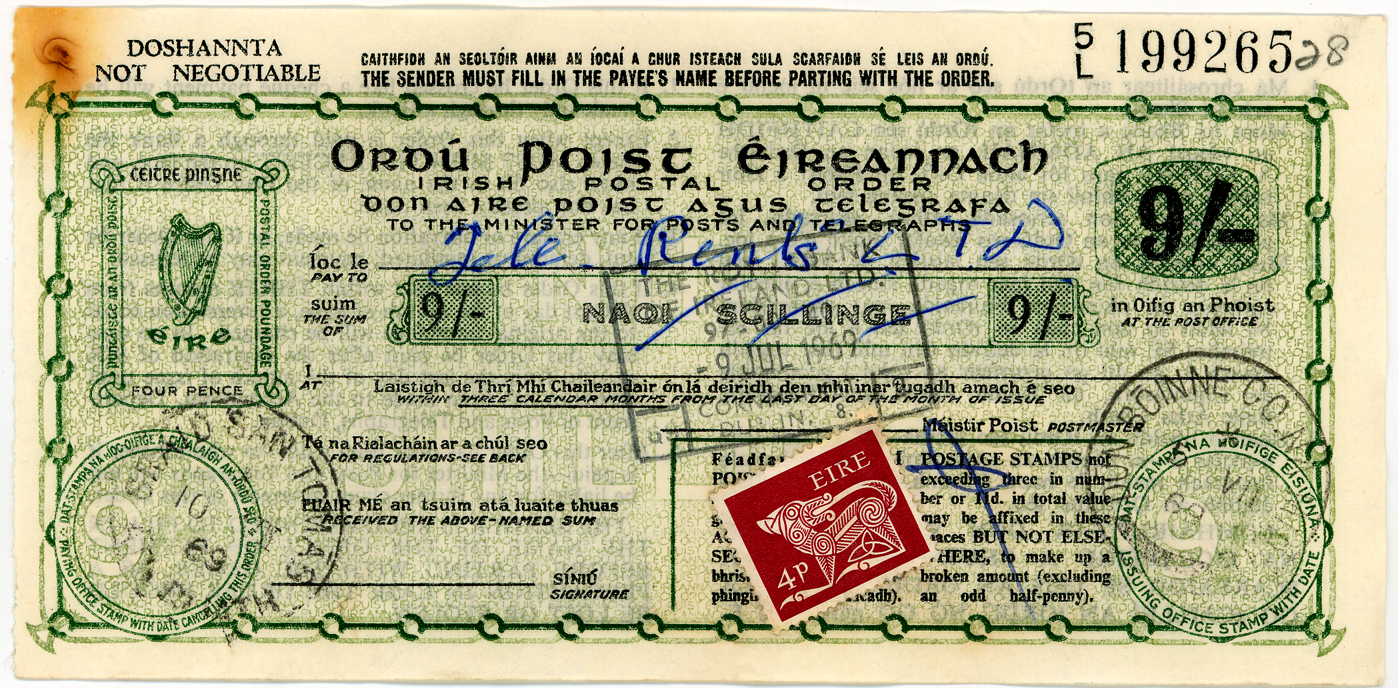
Irish 9 shilling postal order uprated with additional stamp used in 1969. Used postal orders are seldom seen because most were destroyed when they were redeemed or cashed at the post office or bank

In the United Kingdom, the first postal orders went on sale on 1 January 1881. It is a direct descendant of the money order, which had been established by a private company in 1792. During World War I and World War II, British postal orders were temporarily declared legal tender to save paper and labour Postal orders can be bought and redeemed at post offices in the UK, although a crossed postal order must be paid into a bank account. Until April 2006 they came in fixed denominations though an amount of any value less than the next higher fixed denomination could be produced by adding one or more postage stamps in the space on the postal order that was designated for that purpose, but due to increased popularity they were redesigned to make them more flexible and secure. They now have the payee and value added at the time of purchase, making them more like a cheque. There is a fee for using this form of payment. The maximum value of postal order available is £250.00 for a fee of £12.50.

== Use in other countries ==
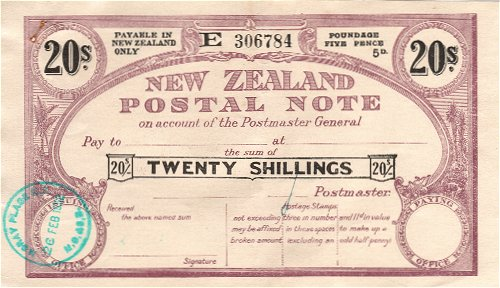
A New Zealand 20 shillings postal note of 1952

The use of postal orders (or postal notes in some countries) was extended to most countries that are now part of the British Commonwealth of Nations, plus to a few foreign countries such as Jordan, Egypt and Thailand.

=== United States ===
United States Postal Money Service was introduced in 1864 by an act on Congress as a way of sending small amounts of money through the mail. By 1865 there were 416 post offices designated as money order offices that had issued money orders to the value of over $1.3 million and by 1882 they had issued orders valued at $113.4 million from 5,491 money order offices.

Currently they facially appear as a draft against an account held by the United States Postal Service, and the United States Postal Service requires a purchaser to know, in advance, where presentment of the instrument will occur. Only special, more expensive United States International Postal Money Orders may be presented abroad. In the United States, international money orders are pink and domestic money orders are green.

=== Canada ===
Canada had its own postal orders (called postal notes) from 1898 until 1 April 1949, when these were discontinued and withdrawn.

A British Forces Post Office in Suffield, Alberta was issuing British postal orders as late as July 2006.

=== China ===
Chinese Imperial Post began issuing postal orders in 1897, the so-called "remittance certificate". After purchase, these certificates are payable at main post offices in China and usually bear franked postage stamps represented as fee. Since 1925, a set of special stamps were used by post offices to issue secured postal orders. Since 1929, Chinese Post have been able to sell international postal orders cashable under UPU protocol in a few other countries including Japan, Britain, France, and the US.

=== Australia ===
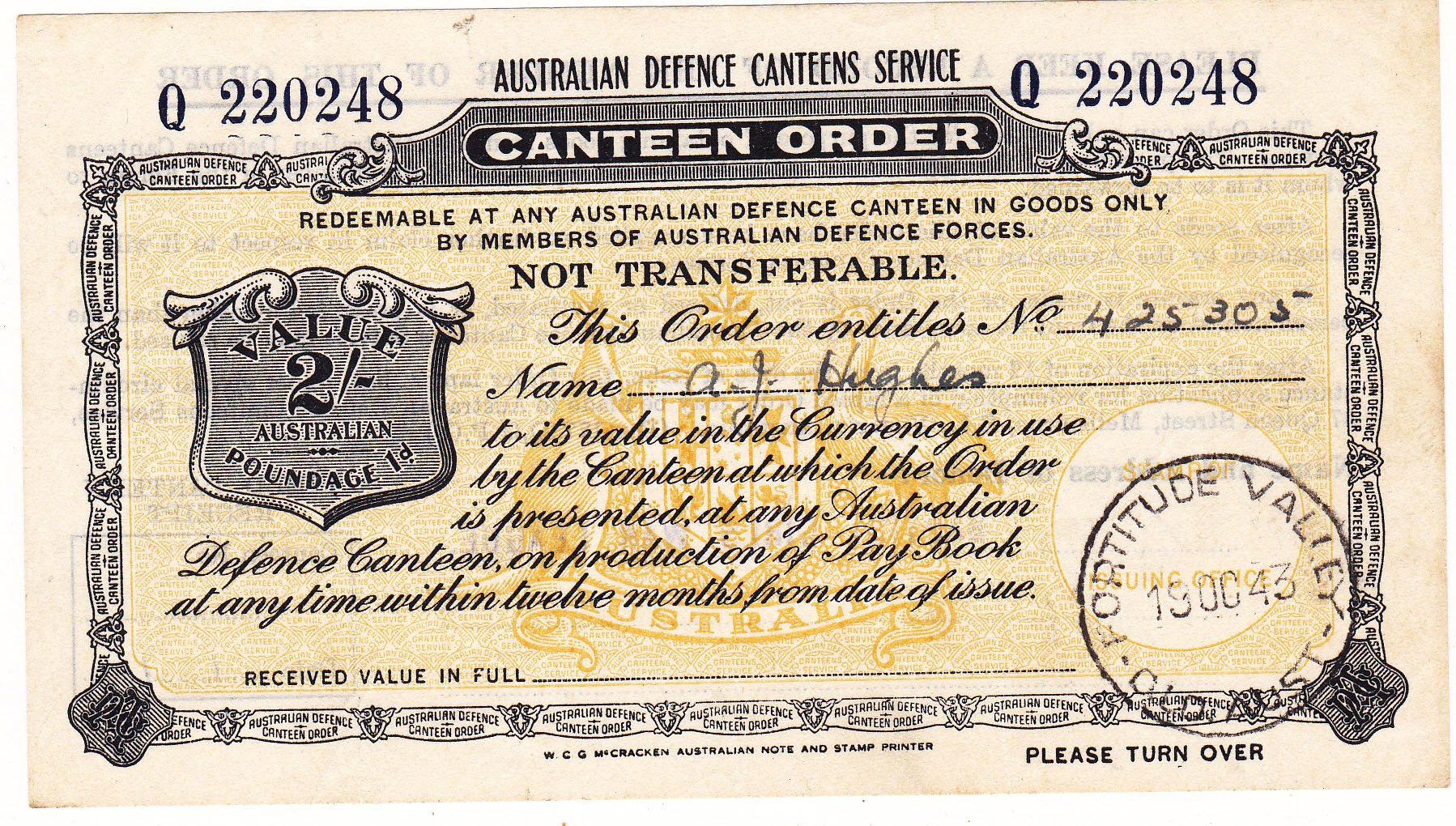
Not used as the recipient was at an RAF base in England and presumably had no ready access to an Australian canteen.

A Defence canteen order was a variant of a postal order used in Australia during World War II. Purchased at a post office, it was payable to an enlisted person in goods from a canteen rather than being a cash instrument.

== Collecting ==
Postal orders are gaining in popularity as collectibles, especially among numismatists who collect banknotes.

There is an active numismatic organisation in the UK called the Postal Order Society that was established in 1985 with members both domestically and overseas. They hold twice-yearly postal auctions of postal orders and related material from across the British Commonwealth.

== Advantages ==
Despite competition from cheques and electronic funds transfer, postal orders continue to appeal to customers, especially as a form of payment for shopping on the Internet, as they are drawn on the Post Office's accounts so a vendor can be certain that they will not bounce. They also enable those without a bank account, including minors, to make small financial transactions without the need for cash. Postal workers in the United Kingdom use voided or cancelled orders in their training.

== See also ==
- George Archer-Shee, whose court case inspired Terence Rattigan's play The Winslow Boy.
- List of countries that have used postal orders
- Promotional postal order
