= List of residents of Barnes, London =

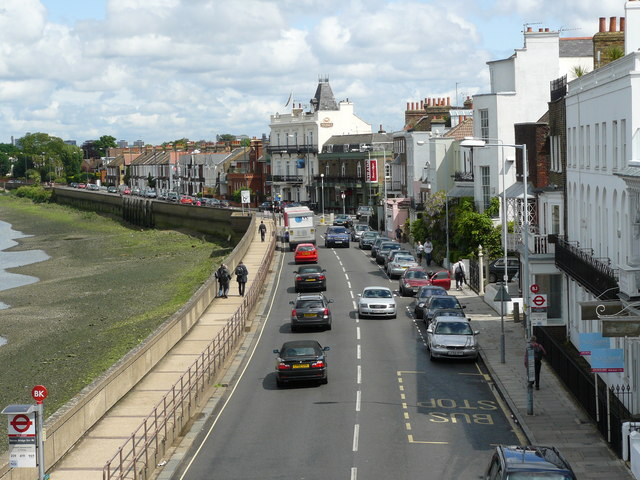
The Terrace

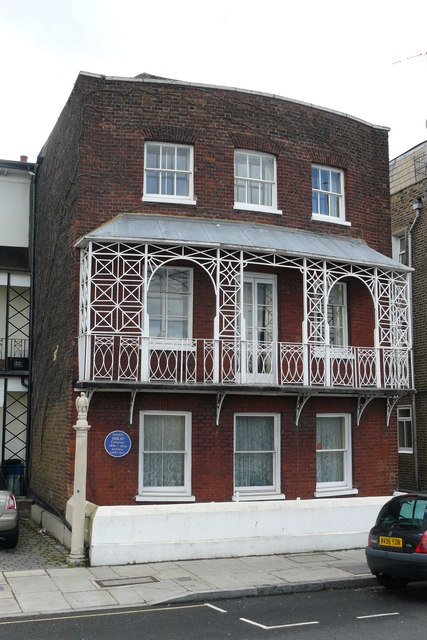
10 The Terrace, where Gustav Holst lived from 1908 to 1913.

This is a list of notable residents of Barnes, London, a district in the London Borough of Richmond upon Thames. (Note: Only notable people with entries on Wikipedia have been included, and their birth or residence has been verified by citations.)

Barnes, in a bend of the River Thames, is in the extreme north-east of Richmond upon Thames (and as such is the closest part of the borough to central London). Its built environment includes a high proportion of 18th- and 19th-century buildings in the streets near Barnes Pond. Together these make up the Barnes Village conservation area, where along with its west riverside most of the mid-19th century properties are concentrated.

Barnes has retained its village-like atmosphere and, with its easy links to central London, (Note: Trains from Barnes can reach London Waterloo station in 23 minutes.) it has attracted residents from the financial and arts sectors. Its past residents include the composer Gustav Holst (1874–1934) and Ninette de Valois (1898–2001), founder of the Royal Ballet. They each lived in houses on The Terrace which are now marked by blue plaques.

== Living people ==
Name	Dates	Description	Notes	Refs	Images
Michael Ball	b. 1962	Singer and actor	Lives in Barnes		
Sir Tim Besley	b. 1960	Economist	Lives in Barnes		
Samantha Bond	b. 1961	Shakespearean actress best known for playing Miss Moneypenny in four James Bond films and for her role as Lady Rosamund Painswick in Downton Abbey	She was born in Barnes		
Gyles Brandreth	b. 1948	Writer, broadcaster, actor, comedian and former Conservative Party MP for the City of Chester	Lives in Barnes		
Niamh Cusack	b. 1959	Irish actress, whose roles have included Dr Kate Rowan in the UK series Heartbeat (1992–1995)	Lives in Barnes		
Duffy	b. 1984	Singer, songwriter and actress	Has lived at 26 The Terrace in Barnes		
Michael Edwards	b. 1938	Poet and academic	Was born in Barnes		
Sheherazade Goldsmith	b. 1974	Environmentalist, jeweller and columnist	Lives in Barnes		
Zac Goldsmith, Baron Goldsmith of Richmond Park	b. 1975	Life peer and former MP for Richmond Park	Lives in Barnes		
David Harsent	b. 1942	Poet	Lives in Barnes		
Patricia Hodge	b. 1946	Actress	Lives in Barnes		
Tomoyasu Hotei (布袋 寅泰)	b. 1962	Japanese musician, singer-songwriter, composer, record producer and actor	Moved to Barnes in 2012		
Karen Inglis		Children's author	Lives in Barnes		
Aled Jones	b. 1970	Singer, actor and radio and television presenter	He lives in Barnes.		
Emilia Jones	b. 2022	Actress and singer	She was brought up in Barnes.		
Ronan Keating	b.1977	Singer, songwriter, musician, philanthropist and broadcast presenter	He and his wife Storm live in Barnes		
Matthew Kneale	b. 1960	Writer, best known for his 2000 novel English Passengers	Brought up in Barnes		
Susan Kramer, Baroness Kramer	b. 1950	Life peer and former MP for Richmond Park	Lives in Barnes		
Gary Lineker	b. 1960	Sports broadcaster and former professional footballer	Lives in Barnes		
Suzannah Lipscomb	b. 1978	Historian, academic and broadcaster specialising in the 16th century	Lives in Barnes		
George MacKay	b. 1992	Actor	Brought up in Barnes		
Dr Tania Mathias	b. 1964	Ophthalmologist and Conservative Party politician who was MP for Twickenham from 2015 to 2017	Brought up in Barnes		
Brian May	b. 1947	Musician, singer, songwriter and astrophysicist, best known as the lead guitarist of the rock band Queen	Has lived at Suffolk Road, Barnes		
Roger McGough	b. 1937	Performance poet, broadcaster, children's author and playwright	Lives in Barnes		
Alistair McGowan	b. 1964	Impressionist, comic, actor, singer and writer	Lives in Barnes		
Chris Patten, Baron Patten of Barnes	b. 1944	Life peer, Chancellor of the University of Oxford, and former MP for Bath, who subsequently served as 28th Governor of Hong Kong and Chairman of the BBC Trust	Lives in Barnes		
Robert Pattinson	b. 1986	Actor, musician and songwriter	Brought up in Barnes		Robert Pattinson
Jan Ravens	b. 1958	Actress and impressionist known for her voice work on Spitting Image and Dead Ringers	Lives in Barnes		
Dan Snow	b. 1978	Historian and broadcaster	Brought up in Barnes		
Roger Taylor	b. 1949	Musician, singer, songwriter, and multi-instrumentalist, best known as the drummer for the rock band Queen	Lived on White Hart Lane and at 40 Ferry Road, Barnes		
Pete Tong	b. 1960	Disc jockey	Lives in Barnes		
Stanley Tucci	b. 1960	Actor, writer, producer and film director	Lives in Barnes		
Julia Watson	b. 1953	Actress known for playing Barbara "Baz" Wilder in the BBC medical drama Casualty	Lives in Barnes		
Holly Willoughby	b. 1981	Television presenter, model and author	She and her husband, television executive Dan Baldwin, lived in Barnes until 2024.		

== Historical figures ==
Those marked § are commemorated in Barnes by a blue plaque.

Name	Dates	Description	Notes	Refs	Images
Louis-Alexandre de Launay, comte d'Antraigues and his wife, Madame Saint-Huberty	1753–1812 1756–1812	De Launay was a French pamphleteer, diplomat spy and political adventurer during the French Revolution and Napoleonic Wars. Saint-Huberty was a celebrated French operatic soprano.	Murdered at their country home at 27 The Terrace, which they had purchased about three years earlier, by an Italian servant whom they had dismissed		
Ninette de Valois	1898–2001	Founder of the Royal Ballet	Lived at 14 The Terrace from 1962 to 1982	§	14 The Terrace, Barnes
Major John Freeman	1915–2014	Politician, diplomat and broadcaster	Lived in Barnes		
Amy Gentry	1903–1976	Pioneer of women's rowing	She was born in Barnes.		
James Henry Greathead	1844–1896	Railway engineer and pioneer of tunnelling	Lived at 3 St Mary's Grove, Barnes, from 1885 to 1889	§	
Arthur Marshall	1910–1989	Writer, raconteur and broadcaster,best known in the UK as a team captain on the BBC's Call My Bluff	He was born in Barnes and went to Ranelagh House, a co-educational school overlooking Barnes Common.		
Alice Meynell	1847–1922	Writer, editor, critic, and suffragist, now remembered mainly as a poet	She was born in Barnes.		
Sir Ralph Moor	1860–1909	High Commissioner of the British Southern Nigeria Protectorate	Poisoned himself at The Homestead on Church Road in 1909		
Colin Patterson	1933–1998	Palaentologist at the Natural History Museum	Lived in Barnes		
Jan Pieńkowski	1936–2022	Writer and illustrator	Lived in Barnes and was a patron of the Barnes Literary Society		
Lyon Playfair	1818–1898	Professor of chemistry and Liberal MP	Lived at 26 Castelnau Villas (98 Castelnau), Barnes in 1851, while taking part in organising the Great Exhibition		
Albert Frederick Pollard	1869–1948	Historian and founder of the Historical Association	Lived at 7 St Mary's Grove		
Sir John Power, 1st Baronet	1870–1950	Businessman and Conservative MP for Wimbledon	Lived at 1 Queen's Ride, Barnes from 1908 to 1919		
Sir John Russell Reynolds, 1st Baronet	1828–1896	British neurologist and physician, President of the Royal College of Physicians, 1893–95	Occupied Rose Cottage, Barnes Green as a weekend cottage from about 1862 to 1870		
Robert Willis	1799–1878	Scottish physician, librarian, and medical historian	Lived and practised at The Homestead on Church Road from 1846 until his death in 1878		The Homestead

=== Actors ===
Name	Dates	Description	Notes	Refs	Images
Joss Ackland	1928-2023	Actor	He lived in Barnes		
Peter Bowles	1936–2022	Actor, best known as Richard de Vere in To the Manor Born, Major Yeates in The Irish R.M. and Donald Fairchild in Executive Stress	Lived in Barnes		
Phyllis Calvert	1915–2002	Actress	Lived in Barnes		
Clive Dunn	1920–2012	Actor, best known as Lance Corporal Jones in Dad's Army	He and his wife Cilla had a house in Barnes		
Jimmy Edwards	1920–1988	Comedy actor and writer, best known as Pa Glum in Take It from Here and as headmaster "Professor" James Edwards in Whack-O!	Born in Barnes		
Rik Mayall	1958–2014	Actor, writer and comedian, and a pioneer of alternative comedy in the 1980s	Lived and died in Barnes		
Peter Mayhew	1944–2019	Actor who played Chewbacca in the Star Wars films	Born and brought up in Barnes		
John Moody	c.1727–1812	Irish actor who retired to Barnes Common as a market gardener	Moody lived at 11 The Terrace, Barnes from about 1780 until his death. He is buried at St Mary's Church, Barnes with his two wives.		
Jimmy Perry	1923–2016	Actor and scriptwriter, co-creator of the TV series Dad's Army	Born in Barnes		
Jon Pertwee	1919–1996	Actor, the Third Doctor in Doctor Who	Had a family house in Barnes		
Terry-Thomas	1911–1990	Comedian and character actor who became known to a worldwide audience through his films during the 1950s and 1960s	Terry-Thomas lived in Barnes.		
Frank Thornton	1921–2013	Actor (Captain Peacock in the BBC comedy Are You Being Served?)	Lived and died in Barnes		
Dame Dorothy Tutin	1930–2001	Film, television and theatre actress in the West End and for the RSC and National Theatre	Lived in Barnes. Married to actor Derek Waring		
Derek Waring	1927–2007	TV, radio and stage actor	Lived in Barnes. Married to actress Dame Dorothy Tutin		
Aubrey Woods	1928–2013	Actor in theatre, TV and radio	Lived in Barnes		

=== Artists, architects and designers ===
Name	Dates	Description	Notes	Refs	Images
Thomas Allom	1804–1872	Architect, artist, topographical illustrator and a founding member of what became the Royal Institute of British Architects (RIBA)	Allom designed Holy Trinity Barnes and lived locally at 1 Barnes Villas (now 80 Lonsdale Road), Barnes, where he died on 21 October 1872.		
Gillian Ayres	1930–2018	Artist, best known for abstract painting and printmaking using vibrant colours	Ayres was born and brought up in Barnes.		
Lynn Chadwick	1914–2003	Sculptor and artist	Chadwick was born in Barnes.		
Christopher Dresser	1834–1904	Designer and design theorist	Dresser lived at Elm Bank, Barnes from 1889 to 1904.		
Sidney Richard Percy	1821–1886	Landscape painter	Percy lived with his father, the painter Edward Williams (1781–1855), at 32 Castelnau Villas (92 Castelnau), from 1845 to 1856. Percy was born Sidney Richard Percy Williams and was Edward's fifth son. All five of his brothers, and several members of the next generation of the Williams family, also became landscape painters.		
Henry William Pickersgill	1782–1875	Portrait painter	Pickersgill lived at Nassau House, Barnes Green, from about 1854 to 1857. He is buried in Barnes Cemetery.		
Kurt Schwitters	1887–1948	German-born artist most famous for his collages, called Merz pictures	He lived at 39 Westmorland Road, Barnes.		§

=== Military ===
Name	Dates	Description	Notes	Refs	Images
Vice-Admiral Alfred Carpenter	1881–1955	Royal Navy officer and a recipient of the Victoria Cross	Carpenter was born in Barnes.		
Admiral Martin Dunbar-Nasmith	1883–1965	Royal Navy officer and a recipient of the Victoria Cross	Dunbar-Nasmith was born at 136 Castelnau.	§	
Lieutenant-General Robert Ballard Long	1771–1825	Officer of the British and Hanoverian Armies	Long retired to his house on The Terrace.		

=== Musicians ===
Name	Dates	Description	Notes	Refs	Images
Marc Bolan	1947–1977	Singer, songwriter, musician and poet	Bolan lived at Lonsdale Road, Barnes.		
Carl Davis	1936-2023	American-born conductor and composer	He lived in Barnes		
George Frederick Handel	1685–1759	Composer	Handel lived at the house of Mr Mathew Andrews in Barn Elms in the summer of 1713.	§	
Gustav Holst	1874–1934	Composer, arranger and teacher, best known for his orchestral suite The Planets	Holst lived at 31 Gretna Road, Richmond from 1903 to 1908, then moved with his family to Barnes. The house at 10 The Terrace where he lived between 1908 and 1913 has a blue plaque in his honour.	§	
Herbert Howells	1892–1983	Composer, organist and teacher, most famous for his large output of Anglican church music	Howells lived from 1946 to 1983 at 3 Beverley Close, Barnes.		3 Beverley Close, Barnes where Howells lived from 1946 to 1983 Blue plaque commemorating Howells' residence at 3 Beverley Close
Freddie Mercury	1946–1991	Musician, vocalist and lyricist of the rock band Queen	Mercury shared a house at 40 Ferry Road.		

=== Sportspeople ===
Name	Dates	Description	Notes	Refs	Images
Ebenezer Cobb Morley	1831–1924	A solicitor and sportsman, Morley is regarded as the father of The Football Association and modern football.	He lived at 26 The Terrace at Barnes and is buried in Barnes Cemetery.		

=== Writers ===
Name	Dates	Description	Notes	Refs	Images
Lynne Reid Banks	1929–2024	Author	She was born in Barnes.		
Henry Fielding	1707–1754	Novelist, author of Tom Jones and also a magistrate who founded the Bow Street Runners	Fielding lived at Milbourne House, Barnes Green in about 1750, when writing Amelia.		
Judith Kerr	1923–2019	Author and illustrator	She and her husband, Nigel Kneale (1922–2006), scriptwriter, both lived in Barnes.		
Eric Newby	1919–2006	Travel author	Newby was brought up in Castelnau Mansions, Barnes.		
Barbara Pym	1913–1980	Novelist, and Fellow of the Royal Society of Literature, whose Quartet in Autumn (1977) was nominated for the Booker Prize	Pym lived at 47 Nassau Road.		
Richard Brinsley Sheridan	1751–1816	Playwright, poet, theatre owner and Whig MP	Sheridan owned Downe House, Richmond Hill and took a house on Barnes Terrace in 1810 when his son Tom was living at Milbourne House.		
Dodie Smith	1896–1990	Author of I Capture the Castle and The Hundred and One Dalmatians	Smith lived in Riverview Gardens.		
Colin Welland	1934–2015	Oscar-winning screenwriter of Chariots of Fire	Welland lived in Barnes.		

== See also ==
- Barnes, London
- List of people from the London Borough of Richmond upon Thames
