= The Terrace, Barnes =

Street in London, England

Coordinates: 51°28′21.99″N 0°15′8.61″W

The Terrace

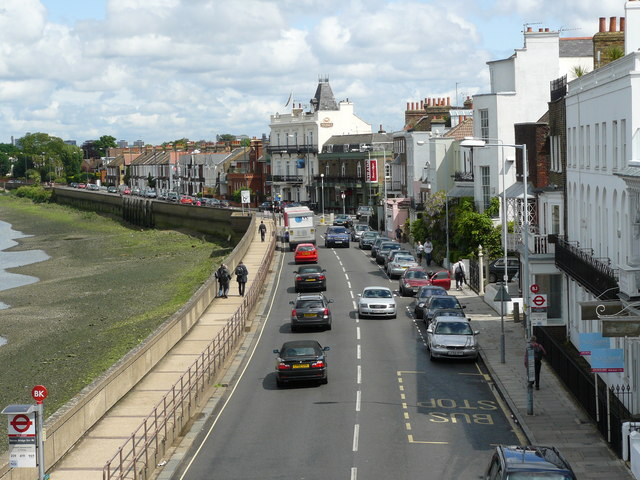
- The Terrace

- Location within London Borough of Richmond upon Thames
- Location: Barnes, London, England, United Kingdom
- Postal code: SW13 0NP and SW13 0NR
- Nearest railway station: Barnes Bridge station (South Western Railway)

Other
- Known for: Georgian mansions, many of them Grade II listed buildings and some with notable former residents

The Terrace is a street in Barnes in the London Borough of Richmond upon Thames. It forms part of the A3003 road, and runs west from its junction with Barnes High Street and Lonsdale Road to the east, where it becomes Mortlake High Street. Only one side of the street has houses; they all overlook the River Thames.

The Terrace runs along the west bend of the river and is lined with Georgian mansions, most of them dating from the 18th century and some from as early as 1720. Many of the houses are Grade II listed buildings and there have been several notable residents.

The street includes Barnes Railway Bridge, Barnes Bridge station and a Victorian pub, The White Hart, which overlooks the Thames and is a prominent landmark on the course of the Boat Race. It served as a headquarters for Barnes Football Club in the mid-19th century.

== Historic buildings and notable people ==
Twelve houses on the street (Nos. 3, 7, 7A, 8, 9, 10, 11, 13, 14, 28, 30 and 31) are listed at Grade II by Historic England.

William Ernest Henley (1849–1903), poet, critic and editor, who was the inspiration for Robert Louis Stevenson's character Long John Silver (Treasure Island, 1883), lived at No. 9.

The composer Gustav Holst (1874–1934), best known for his orchestral suite The Planets, lived at No. 10 from 1908 to 1913. A commemorative blue plaque is fixed to the front of the house.

John Moody (c.1727–1812), actor, lived at No. 11, from c.1780 until his death. He is buried in the churchyard of St Mary's Church, Barnes with his two wives.

Dame Ninette de Valois (1898–2001), dancer, teacher, choreographer, and director of classical ballet, lived at No. 14 from 1962 to 1982. A blue plaque is fixed to the front of the house.

During building work in 2015, No. 26 collapsed "like a tower of cards". Pop singer Duffy (born 1984) had previously lived there. It had also been the home of Ebenezer Cobb Morley (1831–1924), sportsman, regarded as the father of The Football Association and modern football.

In 1812, there was a notorious murder at No. 27. It was then the country home of Louis-Alexandre de Launay, comte d'Antraigues (1753–1812) and his wife, the celebrated soprano Madame Saint-Huberty (1756–1812), who were both killed with a dirk and pistol by an Italian servant whom they had dismissed. The servant (Lorenzo, a deserter from the French army in Spain) then shot himself dead at the house. It has never been established whether the murder was committed from private or political motives. Some claimed that the motive behind the murders was simply the fact that Madame Saint-Huberty treated her servants badly. Others saw more sinister political machinations at work, as the d'Antraigues were active spies, working for the Bourbons, Russia and Britain. When the house was sold in more recent times, its history was mentioned in the advertising materials, but not the double murder and suicide.

Richard Brinsley Sheridan (1751–1816), playwright, poet, theatre owner and Whig MP, took a house on The Terrace in 1810, when his son Tom was living nearby at Milbourne House.

Lieutenant-General Robert Ballard Long (1771–1825) retired to his house on The Terrace.

Charles Alexander Calvert (1828–1879), actor and theatre manager, lived at a house on The Terrace.

Film production designer John Box (1920–2005) lived at 5 Elm Bank Mansions, adjacent to this street.

The Terrace from Chiswick

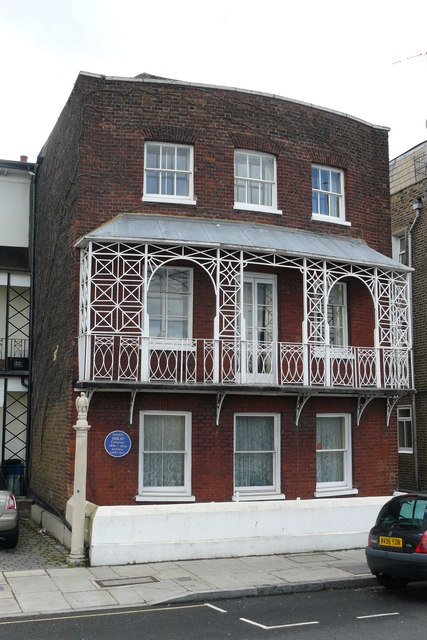
10 The Terrace, Barnes

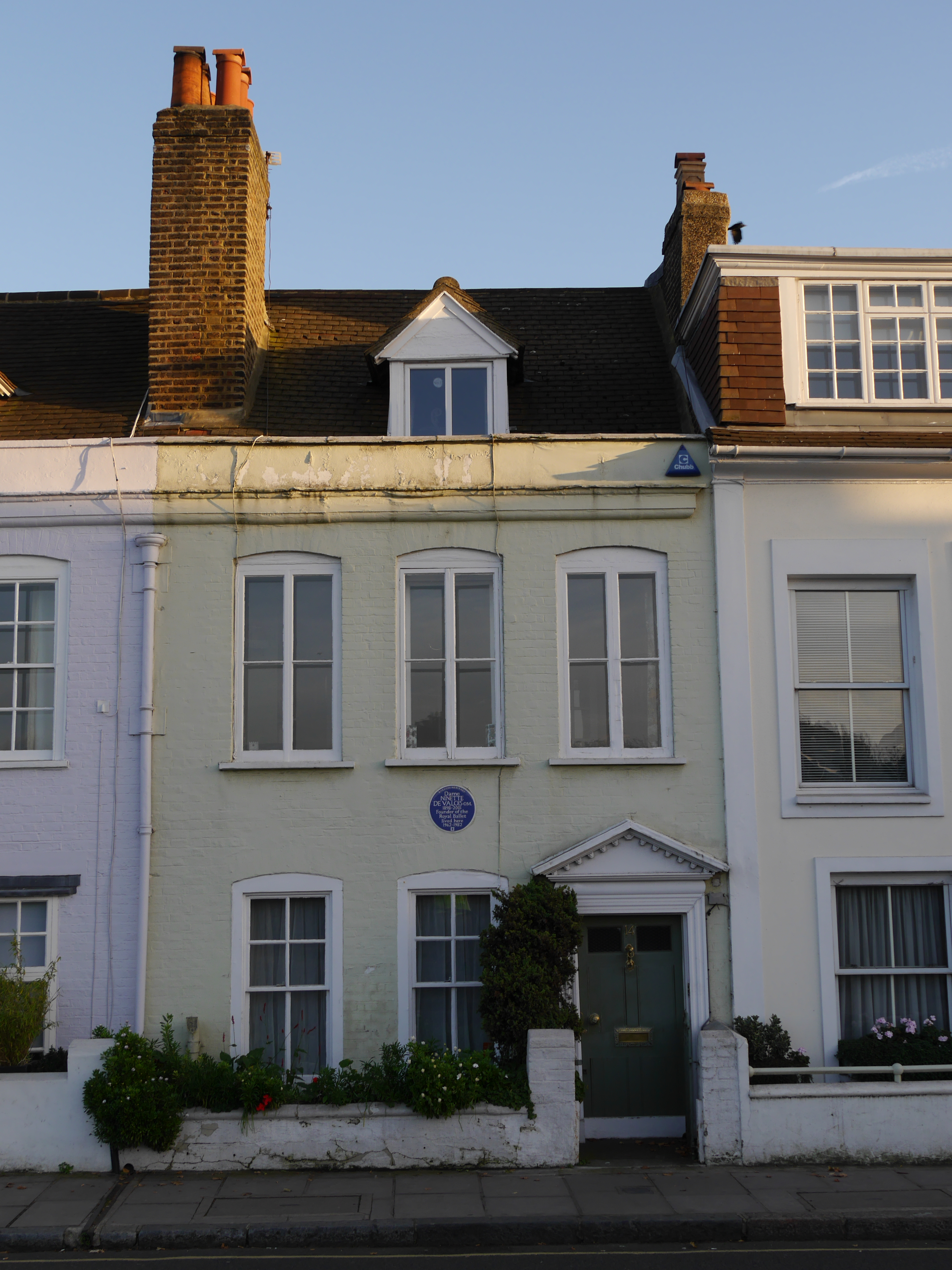
14 The Terrace, Barnes

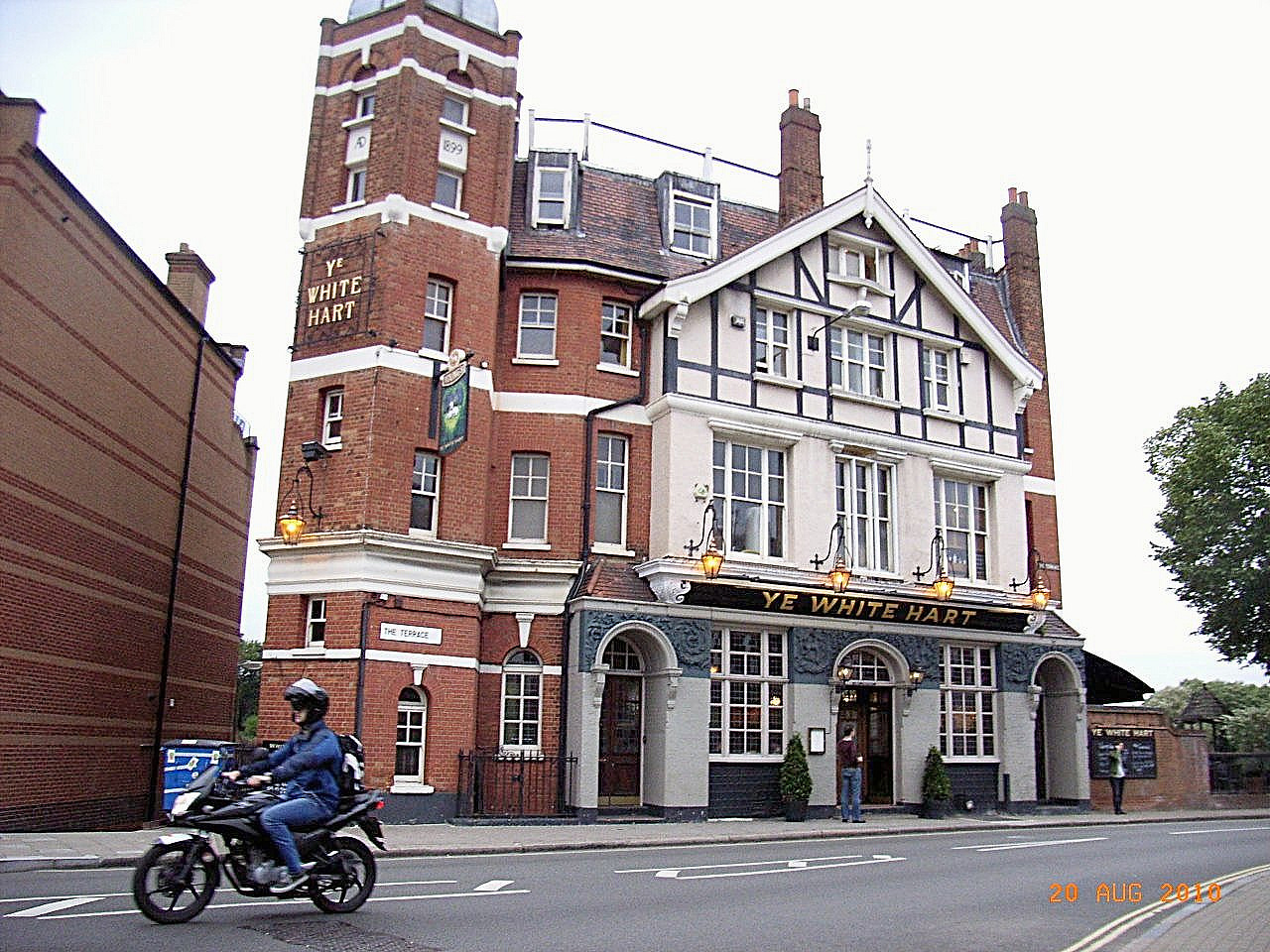
The White Hart pub

== See also ==
- 14 The Terrace, Barnes
- Barnes Bridge railway station
- Barnes Railway Bridge
- List of residents of Barnes, London
