= Barnes Hospital =

Barnes Hospital may refer to:

- Barnes Hospital, Cheadle in Greater Manchester, England
- Barnes Hospital, London in Richmond upon Thames, England
- Barnes-Jewish Hospital in St. Louis, Missouri, United States
