= Karen Inglis =

English children's author

- Occupation: Children's writer
- Website: https://kareninglisauthor.com/

Karen Inglis is an English self-published children's author.

== Writing ==
Inglis' debut, The Secret Lake (2011), was aimed at the 8-11 age group, whereas subsequent have books been aimed at younger readers including the 3-5 range. Two sequels to The Secret Lake were published, both with a slightly older (8-12) audience in mind than the previous novel. The third book in the Secret Lake series, Beyond the Secret Lake, won the 2025 Selfies Award.

In 2018 Inglis published a practical guide book – How to Self-Publish and Market a Children's Book.

== Other information ==
Inglis lives in Barnes, London.

== Published works ==
Title	Year	Publisher
The Secret Lake	2011	Well Said Press
Eeek! The Runaway Alien	2012	Well Said Press
Ferdinand Fox's Big Sleep (with Damir Kundalić)	2012	Well Said Press
Ferdinand Fox's Big Sleep Colouring Book (with Damir Kundalić)	2013	Well Said Press
Henry Haynes and The Great Escape	2014	Well Said Press
Walter Brown and the Magician's Hat	2016	Well Said Press
Ferdinand Fox and the Hedgehog	2018	Well Said Press
How to Self-Publish and Market a Children's Book	2018	Well Said Press
The Christmas Tree Wish (with Anne Swift)	2019	Well Said Press
The Tell-Me Tree (with Anne Swift)	2020	Well Said Press
Return to the Secret Lake	2022	Well Said Press
Beyond the Secret Lake	2024	Well Said Press
Ferdinand Fox and the Lost Boy	2024	Well Said Press
Ferdinand Fox Saves the Day	2025	Well Said Press
