= Barnes, London =

Area of south-west London, England

Coordinates: 51.474°N 0.236°W

Barnes
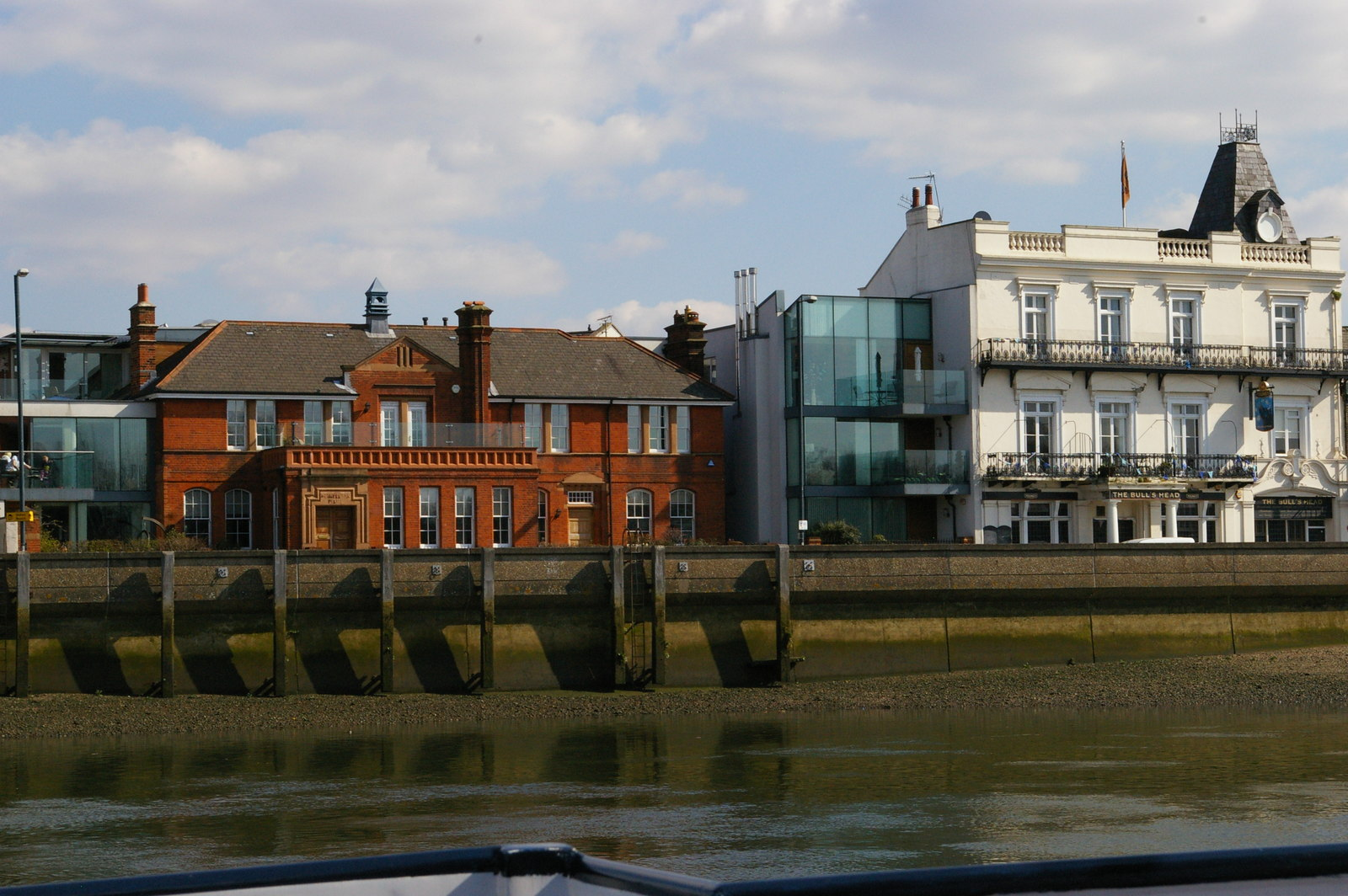
- Riverfront buildings in Barnes

- Location within Greater London
- Area: 4.50 km^{2} (1.74 sq mi)
- Population: 21,218 (Barnes and Mortlake and Barnes Common wards 2011)
  - Density: 4,715/km^{2} (12,210/sq mi)
- OS grid reference: TQ225765
  - Charing Cross: 5.8 mi (9.3 km) ENE
- London borough: Richmond
- Ceremonial county: Greater London
- Region: London
- Country: England
- Sovereign state: United Kingdom
- Post town: LONDON
- Postcode district: SW13
- Dialling code: 020
- Police: Metropolitan
- Fire: London
- Ambulance: London
- UK Parliament: Richmond Park
- London Assembly: South West

Barnes (/bɑːrnz/) is a district in the London Borough of Richmond upon Thames in south-west London, England. It is centred 5.8 miles (9.3 km) west south-west of Charing Cross in a bend of the River Thames.

Its built environment includes a wide variety of convenience and arts shopping on its high street and a high proportion of 18th- and 19th-century buildings in the streets near Barnes Pond. Together they make up the Barnes Village conservation area where, along with its west riverside, pictured, most of the mid-19th-century properties are concentrated. On the east riverside is the WWT London Wetland Centre adjoining Barn Elms playing fields.

Barnes has retained woodland on the "Barnes Trail", a short circular walk taking in the riverside, commercial streets and conservation area, including the Olympic Studios. The trail is marked by silver discs set in the ground and with QR-coded information on distinctive oar signs. The Thames Path National Trail provides a public promenade along the entire bend of the river, which is on the Championship Course in rowing.

Barnes has two railway stations (Barnes and Barnes Bridge) and is served by bus routes towards central London and Richmond.

== Governance ==
Barnes is part of the Richmond Park constituency for elections to the House of Commons and is part of the Barnes ward for elections to Richmond upon Thames London Borough Council.

== Geography and transport ==
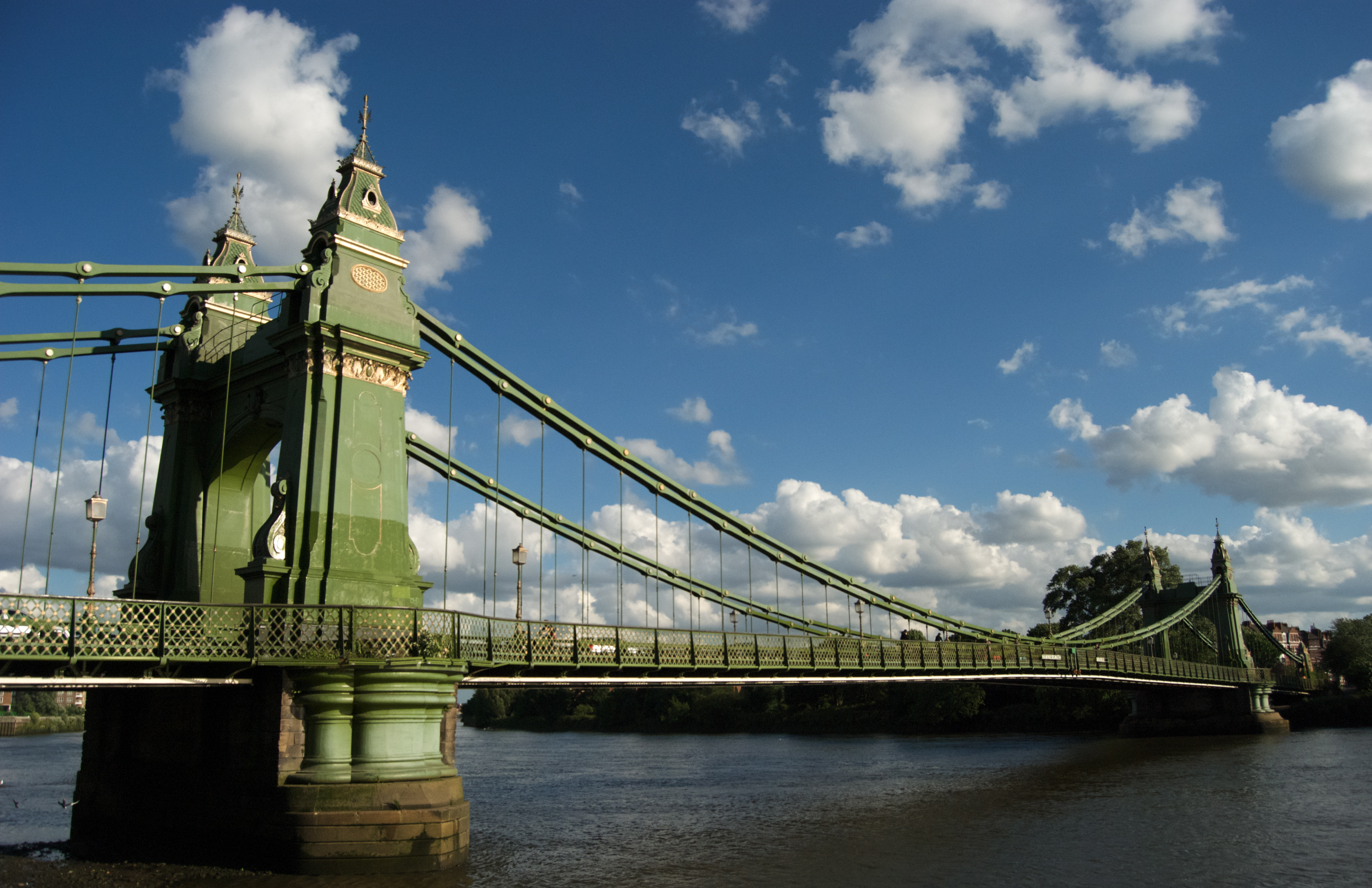
Hammersmith Bridge

Barnes is in south-west London, bounded to the west, north, and east by a meander in the River Thames.

=== Rail ===
==== National Rail ====
Barnes is not on the London Underground network. However, it is served directly by two National Rail stations, both of which are in London fare zone 3:

- Barnes railway station
- Barnes Bridge railway station

Both stations are served exclusively by trains operated by South Western Railway (SWR), with trains terminating in Central London at Waterloo via Clapham Junction. Trains from Barnes and Barnes Bridge both run eastwards, providing Barnes with a direct connection to Chiswick, Brentford and Hounslow. Barnes railway station is also served by trains running southwest towards Teddington and Kingston.

The nearest other railway stations are at Putney and Mortlake.

==== London Underground ====
There are London Underground connections in neighbouring Hammersmith, where two stations serve four lines: the Circle and Hammersmith & City lines and the District and Piccadilly lines. From Hammersmith, there are direct connections to the City and the West End. There are also direct connections to Heathrow Airport, Ealing, the East End and Rayners Lane.

=== Road ===
Barnes has two River Thames crossings, neither of which is a working road bridge. Barnes Railway Bridge is a railway bridge with an adjacent footpath. Hammersmith Bridge is a suspension bridge to the north of Barnes, built in 1887. Since 2019, it has been closed indefinitely to all motor traffic due to structural faults. This affects residents of Barnes who previously relied on the crossing. Other roads which cross the Thames nearby are Chiswick Bridge (A316) to the west and Putney Bridge (A219) to the east.

Many of the roads in Barnes are residential, but several arterial routes pass through the district, carrying traffic across London and South East England. Barnes High Street and Church Road carry the A3003, which runs between Barnes and nearby Mortlake.

The South Circular Road (A205) passes through the southern end of Barnes. It carries traffic eastbound towards Wandsworth, Clapham, the City of London and south east London. Westbound, the road carries traffic away from Central London, either towards Richmond and the M3, or directly to the M4 and the North Circular Road (A406). Kew and Chiswick are en route to the M4. The A306 runs north–south through Barnes, carried by Castelnau and Rocks Lane. Leaving Barnes to the north, the A306 crosses Hammersmith Bridge towards Hammersmith, where traffic meets the Great West Road (A4), which links to Earl's Court and the West End. Southbound, the A306 eventually meets the A3 towards Guildford and Portsmouth. Transport for London (TfL) manages the South Circular Road and the A306 (south of Barnes only).

=== Buses ===
Barnes is served by London Buses 33, 209, 265, 378, 419, 485, 533 and N22. The closure of Hammersmith Bridge since 2019 has severely impacted bus connections to Hammersmith.

=== Cycling ===
Two key cycling routes pass through Barnes:

- National Cycle Route 4 (NCR 4) – this signed cycle route from Greenwich, London to Fishguard, West Wales, runs mainly on shared-use paths or residential streets but, in Barnes, it follows Rocks Lane (A306) for a short distance. For cyclists in Barnes, the route provides an unbroken, albeit indirect, route towards Waterloo via Putney and Chelsea. To the west, NCR 4 passes through Roehampton, Richmond Park and Kingston upon Thames.
- London Cycle Network 37 – Many signs in Barnes still remain along this route, which is part of the discontinued London Cycle Network. The route runs eastbound towards Wandsworth, Vauxhall and the City, or westbound towards Mortlake and Richmond.

Cycles can cross the Thames in Barnes using either Hammersmith Bridge or Barnes Bridge (dismounting to use the footpath). Cycling is permitted along the shared-use path on the southern bank of the Thames between Hammersmith Bridge and Putney Bridge.

=== River Thames ===
The river follows Barnes' northern border. The Thames Path passes through Barnes, following the banks of the river.

Transport for London (TfL), in conjunction with Thames Clippers (branded as Uber Boat), run riverboat services from nearby Putney Pier to Blackfriars, weekday morning and evenings only. This connects the Barnes area to Chelsea, Battersea, Westminster, Embankment and the City. A summer river tour, operated by Thames River Boats, runs from Kew Pier to Westminster, or Richmond and Hampton Court. None of these services stops in Barnes.

Because of the closure of Hammersmith Bridge, a temporary ferry between Barnes and Hammersmith was proposed in 2021. This plan was never implemented.

== History ==
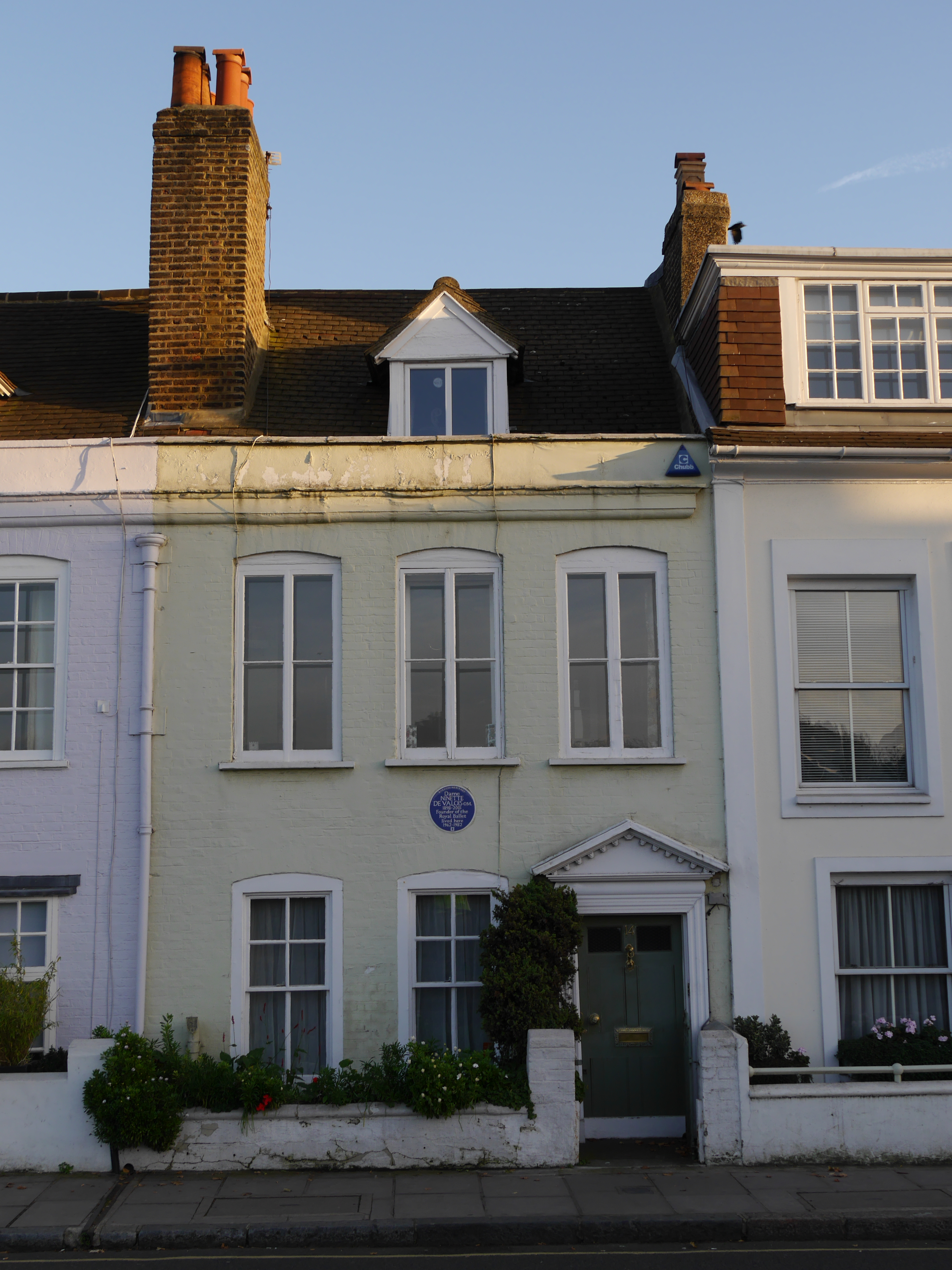
14 The Terrace, Barnes

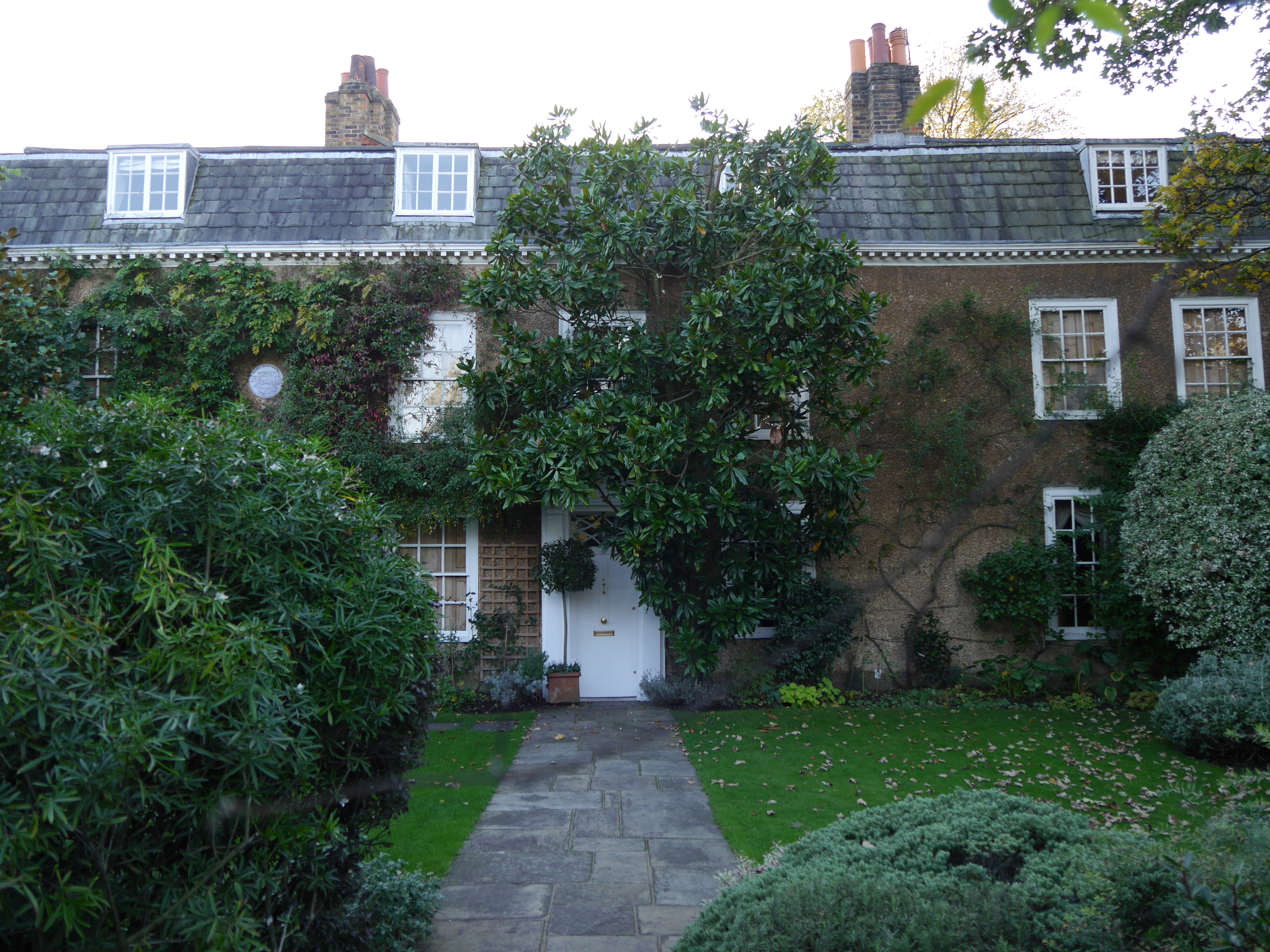
Milbourne House (18 Station Road), Barnes

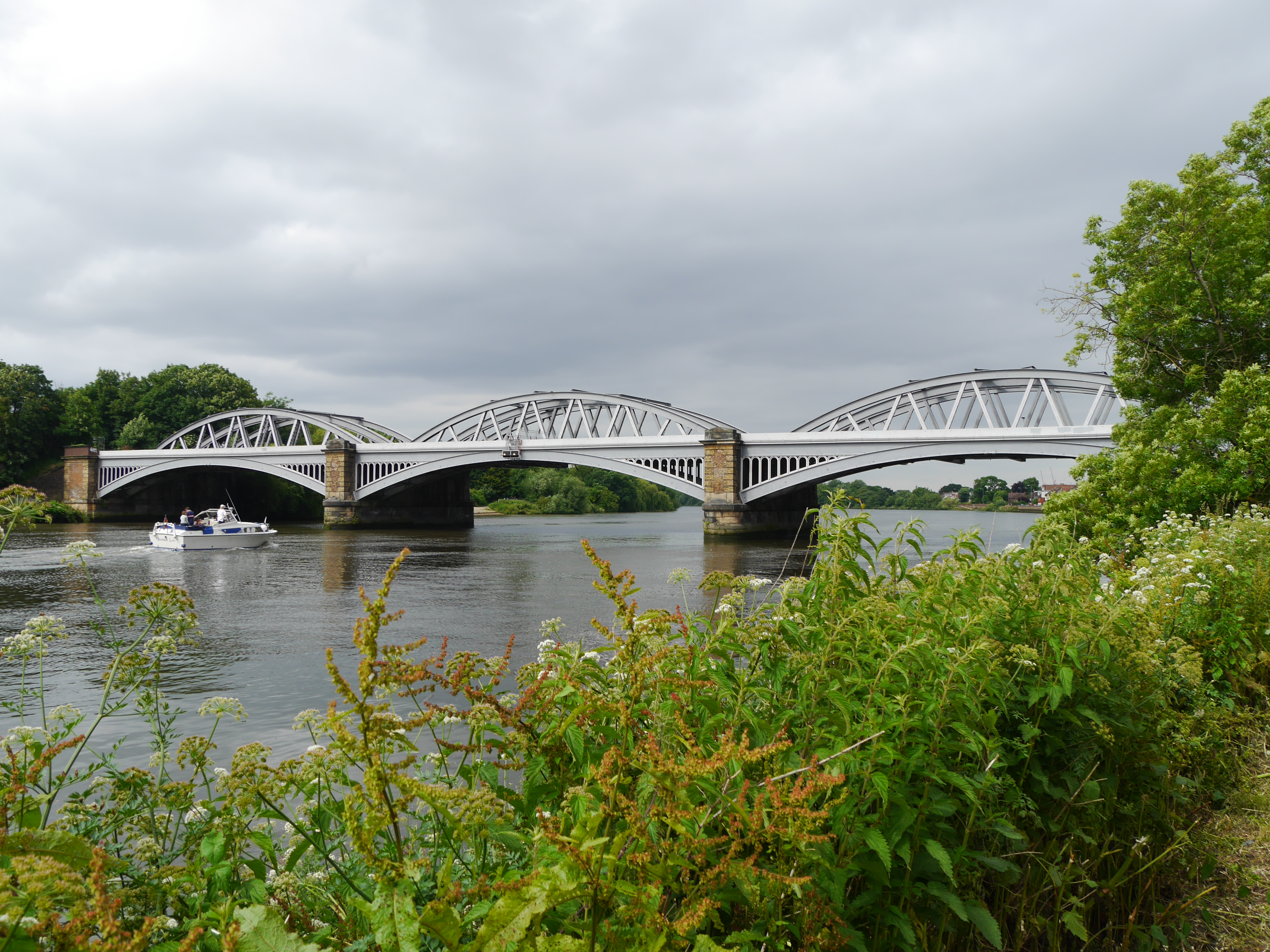
Barnes Railway Bridge

The name Barnes derives from the Old English bere-ærn meaning barn. The name was later pluralised.

Barnes appears in Domesday Book (which was completed in 1086) as "Berne". It was held by the Canons of St Paul of London when its assets were: eight hides, paying tax with Mortlake; six ploughlands, 20 acres (81,000 m^{2}) of meadow. It rendered (in total) to its feudal system overlords £7 per year.

In 1889, Barnes became part of the Municipal Borough of Barnes. In 1965, that borough was abolished and Barnes became part of the London Borough of Richmond upon Thames.

=== Notable buildings ===
The original Norman chapel of St Mary's, Barnes' village church, was built at some point between 1100 and 1150, and was subsequently extended in the early 13th century. In 1215, immediately after confirming the sealing of Magna Carta, Stephen Langton, the Archbishop of Canterbury, stopped on the river at Barnes to dedicate St Mary's church. The church was added to in 1485 and in 1786. After a major fire in 1978 destroyed the Victorian and Edwardian additions to the building, restoration work was completed in 1984.

Some of the oldest riverside housing in London is to be found on The Terrace, a road lined with Georgian mansions which runs along the west bend of the river. Construction of these mansions began as early as 1720. The classical composer Gustav Holst and the ballet dancer and choreographer Ninette de Valois lived in houses on this stretch, both of which have corresponding blue plaques. The Terrace also has an original red brick police station, built in 1891. It has been remodelled as flats but still preserves the original features.

The pink-fronted Rose House at 70 Barnes High Street, facing the area's pond, dates to the 17th century, while Milbourne House facing the Green, the oldest in the area with parts dating to the 16th century, once belonged to the writer Henry Fielding. The park of Barn Elms, formerly the manor house of Barnes, for long the parish's chief property and now an open space and playing field, is home to one of the oldest and largest plane trees in London, one of the Great Trees of London.

The Grade II listed Barnes Railway Bridge, originally constructed in 1849 by Joseph Locke, dominates the view of the river from the Terrace.

Castelnau, in north Barnes and on the banks of the river, has a small church, Holy Trinity. The area between Castelnau and Lonsdale Road contains a 1930s council estate (including roads such as Nowell Road, Stillingfleet Road and Washington Road), mostly consisting of "Boot houses", constructed by the Henry Boot company.

== Barnes Common and the London Wetland Centre ==
Barnes Common is an important open space and a local nature reserve. Its 120 acres (0.49 km^{2}) dominate the south of Barnes, providing a rural setting to the village and a wealth of habitats including acid grassland, scrub, woodland and wetland. Beverley Brook passes through part of the common before meeting the Thames at Putney.

In April 2001, Barnes Pond dramatically emptied overnight. Although a broken drain was suspected, no definite cause could be found. The pond was redeveloped and landscaped with funding from Richmond Council and the local community.

Barn Elms reservoirs were turned into a wetland habitat and bird sanctuary in 1995. The majority of the WWT London Wetland Centre comprises areas of standing open water, grazing marsh and reed bed. It is designated as a Site of Special Scientific Interest as it supports nationally important wintering populations of shoveller (Anas clypeata) and teal (Anas crecca).

== Landmarks, trails and events ==
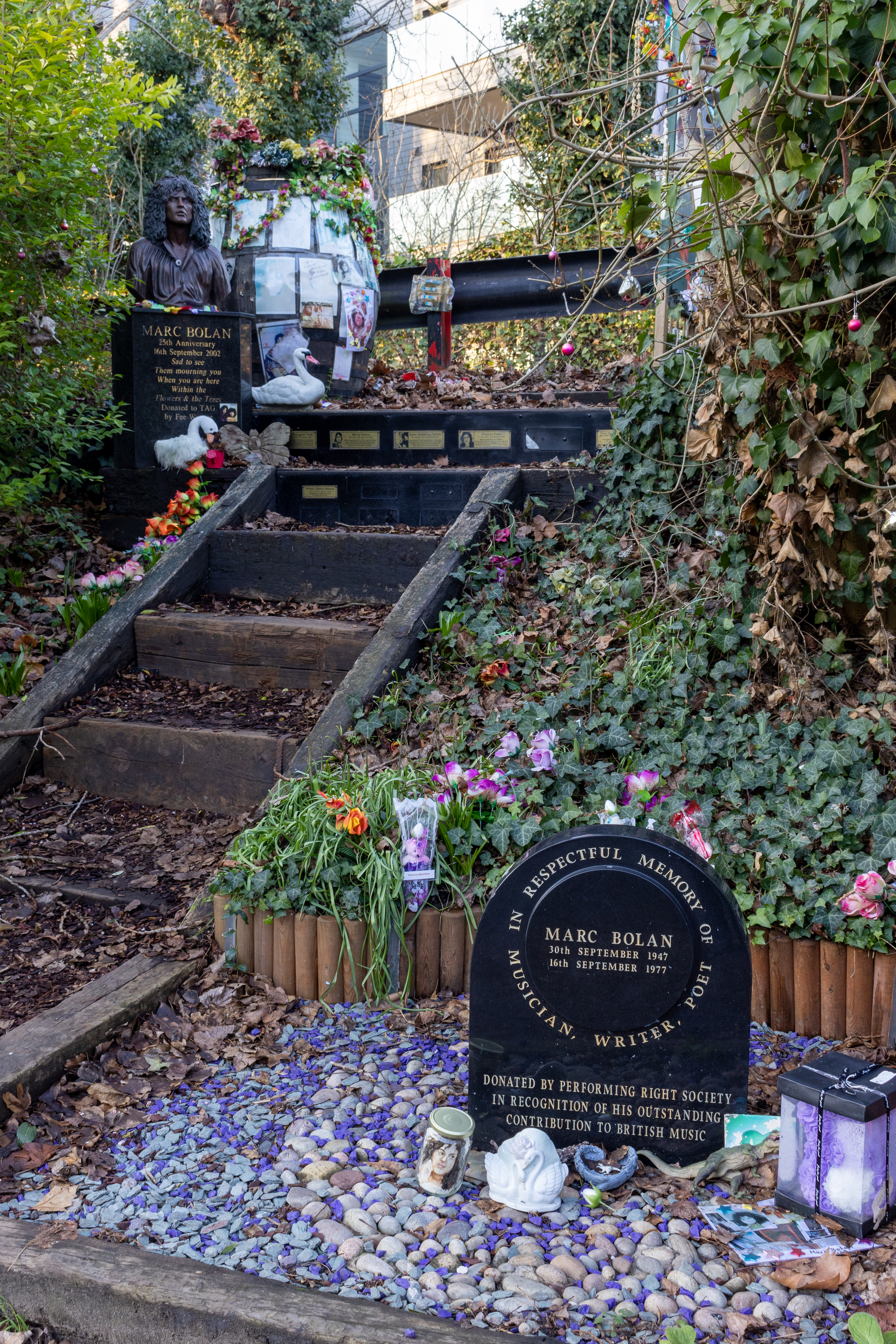
Marc Bolan's Rock Shrine

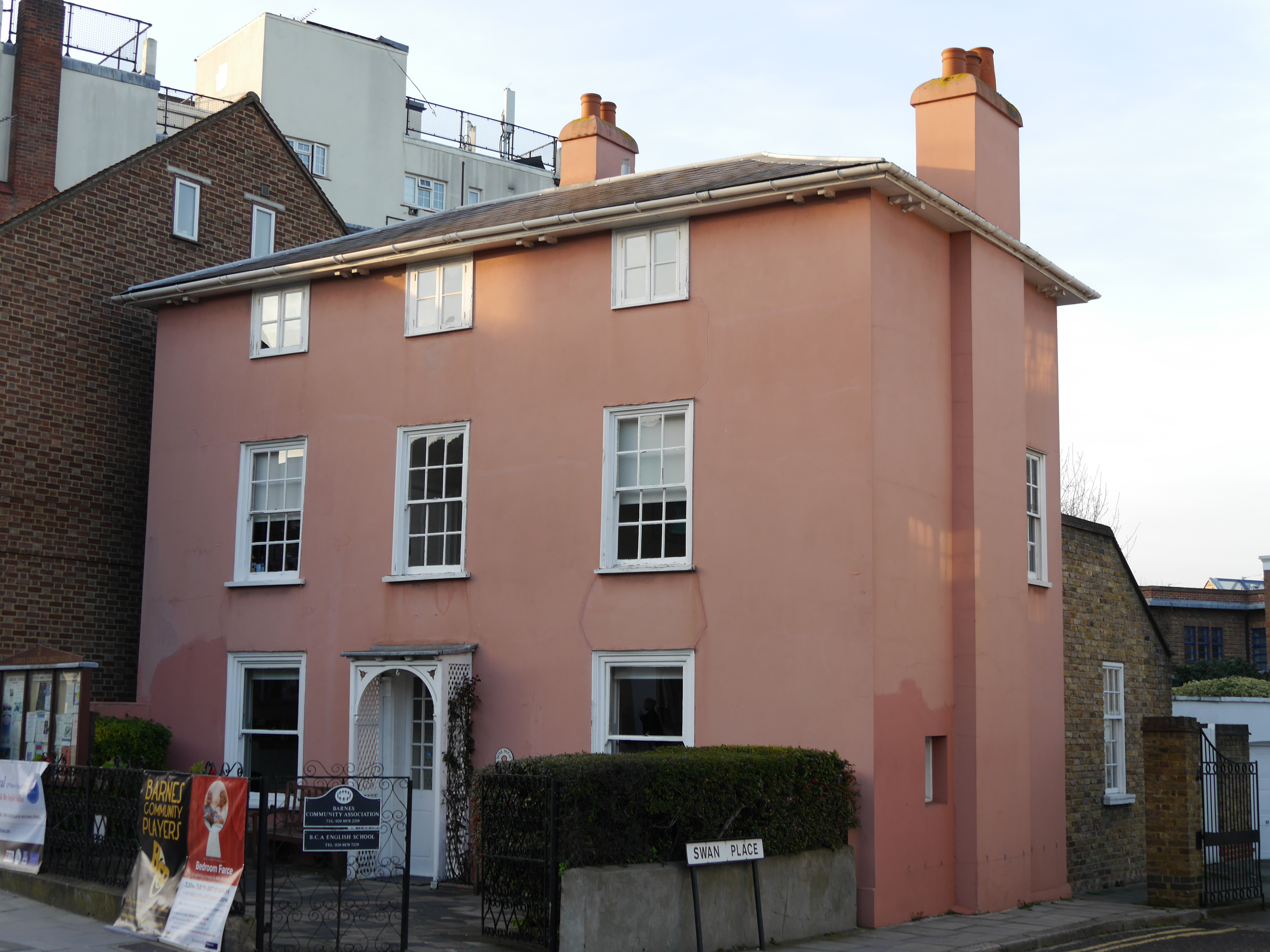
Rose House, 70 Barnes High Street

The Barnes Trail, a 2.3-mile circular walk funded by the Mayor of London and Richmond upon Thames Council, was opened in June 2013. It gained in 2014 a further QR code-marked extension, along its riverside, which equates to the Thames Path National Trail; part of this is wide, pavemented embankments with Victorian townhouses and the rest is tree-lined green space.

The site of rock musician Marc Bolan's fatal car crash on Queen's Ride in 1977 is now Bolan's Rock Shrine. The memorial receives frequent visits from his fans, and in 1997 a bronze bust of Bolan was installed to mark the twentieth anniversary of his death. In 2007, the site was recognised by the English Tourist Board as a "Site of Rock 'n' Roll Importance" in its guide England Rocks.

Facing the Thames, and on the main commercial street's junction, the Bull's Head pub was also one of the first jazz venues in Britain, and now hosts live music in an attached music room with capacity for 80 people.

The OSO Arts Centre, which opened in 2002, is a venue for art and fringe theatre, hosting numerous exhibitions and theatre productions, as well as a regular auction. The building was previously the postal sorting office, but was redeveloped into a mixture of residential and commercial space with the first residents moving there in 1999.

The area around Barnes Pond is host to several open-air and covered markets each month. Barnes Green is the site of the Barnes Fair, held each year on the second Saturday of July and organised by the Barnes Community Association (BCA), whose headquarters are at Rose House, a distinctive 17th-century pink-painted building on Barnes High Street.

In 2015, Barnes Pond became home to London's largest dedicated children's book event, the Barnes Children's Literature Festival, which is now the second largest in Europe.

=== Olympic Studios ===
Olympic Studios on Church Road is an independent cinema, showing a mixture of films on general release and art films. Originally a local cinema and for many years a leading recording studio, down the decades Olympic played host to some of the greatest stars in the history of popular music.

In 1967's Summer of Love, it was at Olympic in Barnes that the Beatles conceived the first parts and ideas of "All You Need Is Love", one of the most influential popular songs in modern history, which debuted a fortnight later in Our World, the first ever global satellite broadcast to millions worldwide.

The Rolling Stones later went on to become such frequent visitors that Mick Jagger gradually designed part of the studio's features himself, while Jimi Hendrix also spent a significant proportion of his entire recording career in the quiet surroundings of Barnes, recording tracks for all three of his studio albums there. Led Zeppelin recorded their debut album and much other material at the studio, from the late 1960s into the mid-1970s. The Who, Queen, Pink Floyd, David Bowie, Ray Charles, Eric Clapton, Shirley Bassey, Ella Fitzgerald, Harry Nilsson, the Verve, Massive Attack, Duran Duran, Coldplay, Prince, Madonna, Adele, and Björk were among the many other visitors.

== Places of worship ==
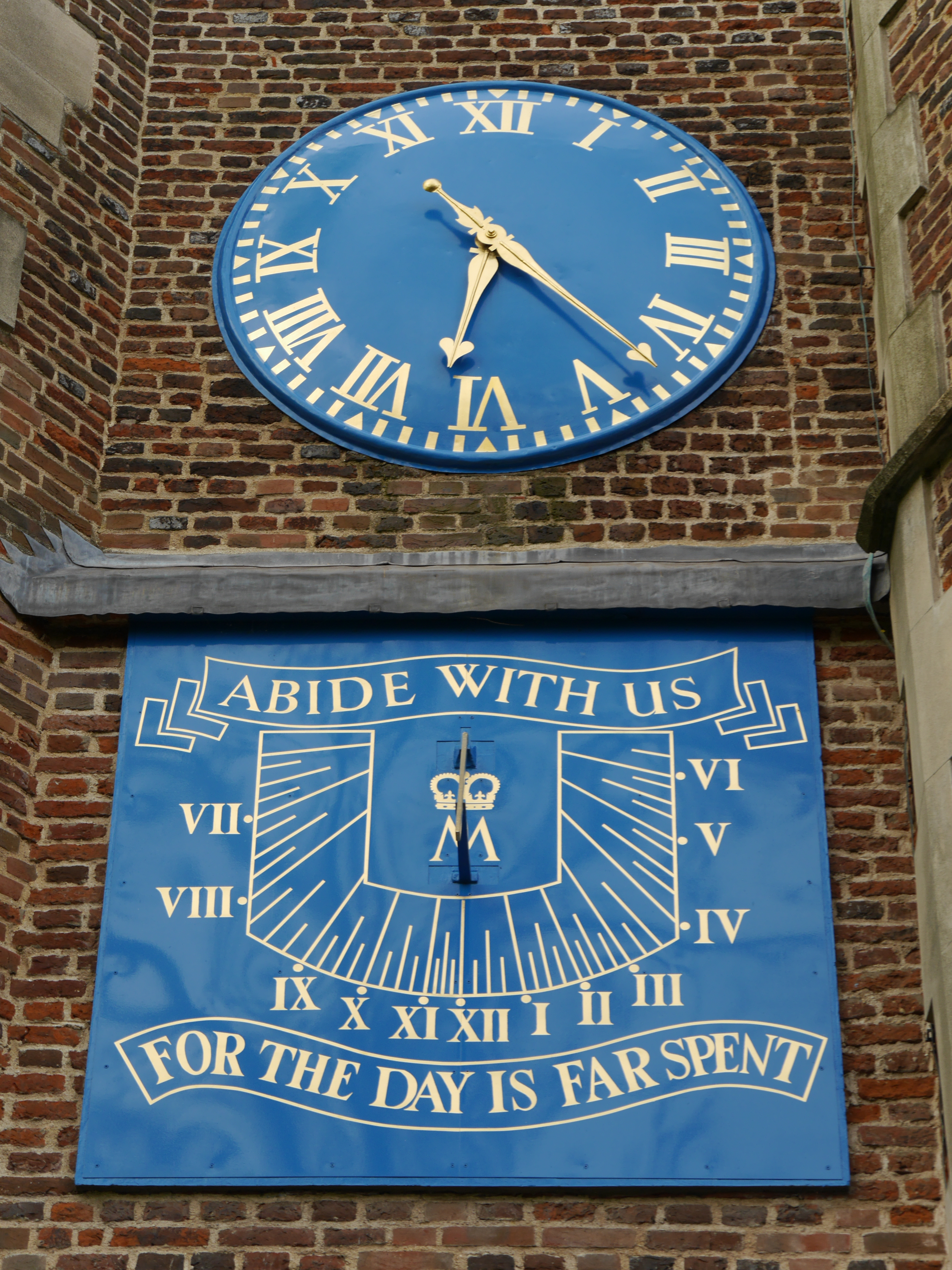
Clock at St Mary's Church

Barnes has seven churches, of which six are members of Churches Together in Barnes:

- Barnes Baptist Church
- Barnes Healing Church (Christian Spiritualist)
- Barnes Methodist Church
- Catholic Church of St Osmund, Barnes
- Holy Trinity Barnes (Church of England)
- St Mary's Church, Barnes (Church of England)
- St Michael and All Angels Church, Barnes (Church of England)

== Societies ==
Barnes and Mortlake History Society
- Abbreviation: BMHS
- Formation: 1955
- Founder: Maurice Cockin
- Legal status: registered charity (number 292918)
- Region served: Barnes, Mortlake and East Sheen
- Members: 400
- Chairman: Paul Rawkins
- Main organ: Barnes and Mortlake History Society Newsletter (four times a year)
- Budget: £7.5k
- Staff: none
- Website: barnes-history.org.uk

The Barnes and Mortlake History Society, founded in 1955 by local resident Maurice Cockin as the Borough of Barnes History Society, promotes interest in the local history of Barnes, Mortlake and East Sheen. It organises a programme of lectures and other activities on historical topics and publishes a quarterly newsletter.

== Sport ==
Association football

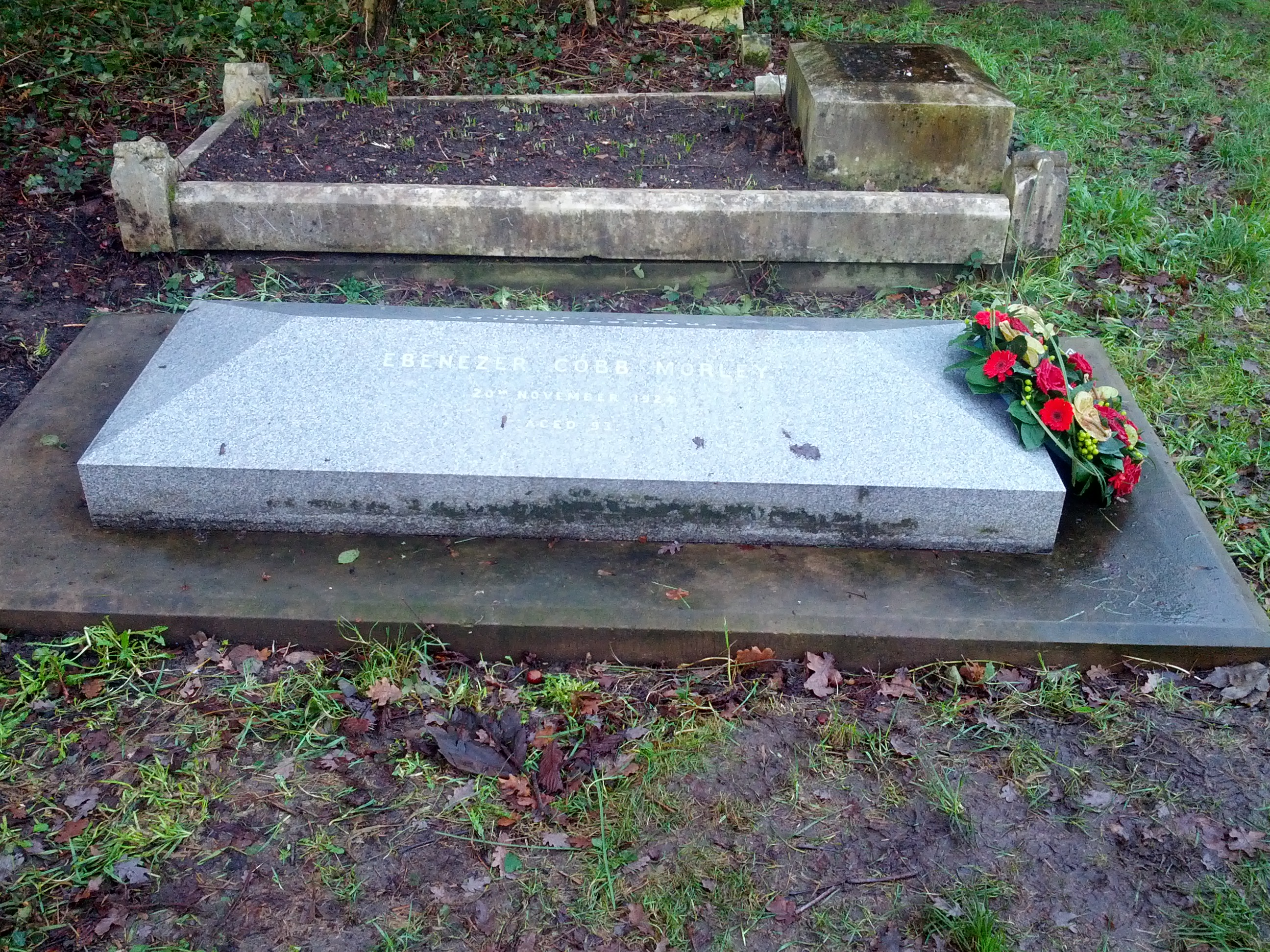
Grave of Ebenezer Cobb Morley in Barnes Cemetery, with a wreath commemorating 150 years of the Football Association

Barnes has a place in the history of football. First, a former High Master of St Paul's School, Richard Mulcaster, is credited with taking mob football and turning it into an organised, refereed team sport that was considered beneficial for schoolboys. St Paul's School is currently sited on Lonsdale Road, although in Mulcaster's time it was at St Paul's Cathedral in the City of London.

Barnes was also home to Ebenezer Cobb Morley, who in 1862 was a founding member of the Football Association. In 1863, he wrote to the weekly sporting newspaper Bell's Life proposing a governing body for football, and this led to the first meeting at the Freemasons' Tavern where the FA was created. He was the FA's first secretary (1863–66) and at his home in Barnes he set out the first set of rules for modern football; these were adopted by the FA and subsequently spread throughout the world. As a player, he took part in the first match played according to today's rules. Morley may be considered the father of football for his key role in establishing modern association football.

Rugby

Barnes Rugby Football Club's ground, known as Barn Elms, is next to the WWT London Wetlands Centre.

Rowing

In rowing, the loop of the Thames surrounding Barnes forms part of the Championship Course used for the Oxford and Cambridge Boat Race and the main national head races, the Head of the River Races, for each category of Olympic boat. Three rowing clubs are across Barnes Bridge, which can be crossed by foot and St Paul's School boat from Barnes. A statue of Steve Fairbairn, who revolutionised technique and equipment in the sport, is by the river close to the London Wetlands Centre in the district.

== Demography and housing ==
To give an equal councillor number and electorate, the wards in the London Borough of Richmond upon Thames are multi-councillor but aim to be equally sized. To achieve this, approximately half of one of the two wards covering modern Barnes also falls within the boundaries of neighbouring Mortlake.

2011 Census homes
Ward	Detached	Semi-detached	Terraced	Flats and apartments	Caravans/temporary/ mobile homes/houseboats	Shared between households
Barnes	277	1,198	996	1,784	0	41
Mortlake and Barnes Common	167	547	1,765	2,453	1	8

2011 Census households
Ward	Population	Households	% Owned outright	% Owned with a loan	Hectares
Barnes	10,299	4,151	32	26	265
Mortlake and Barnes Common	10,919	4,771	27	32	185

== Gallery ==
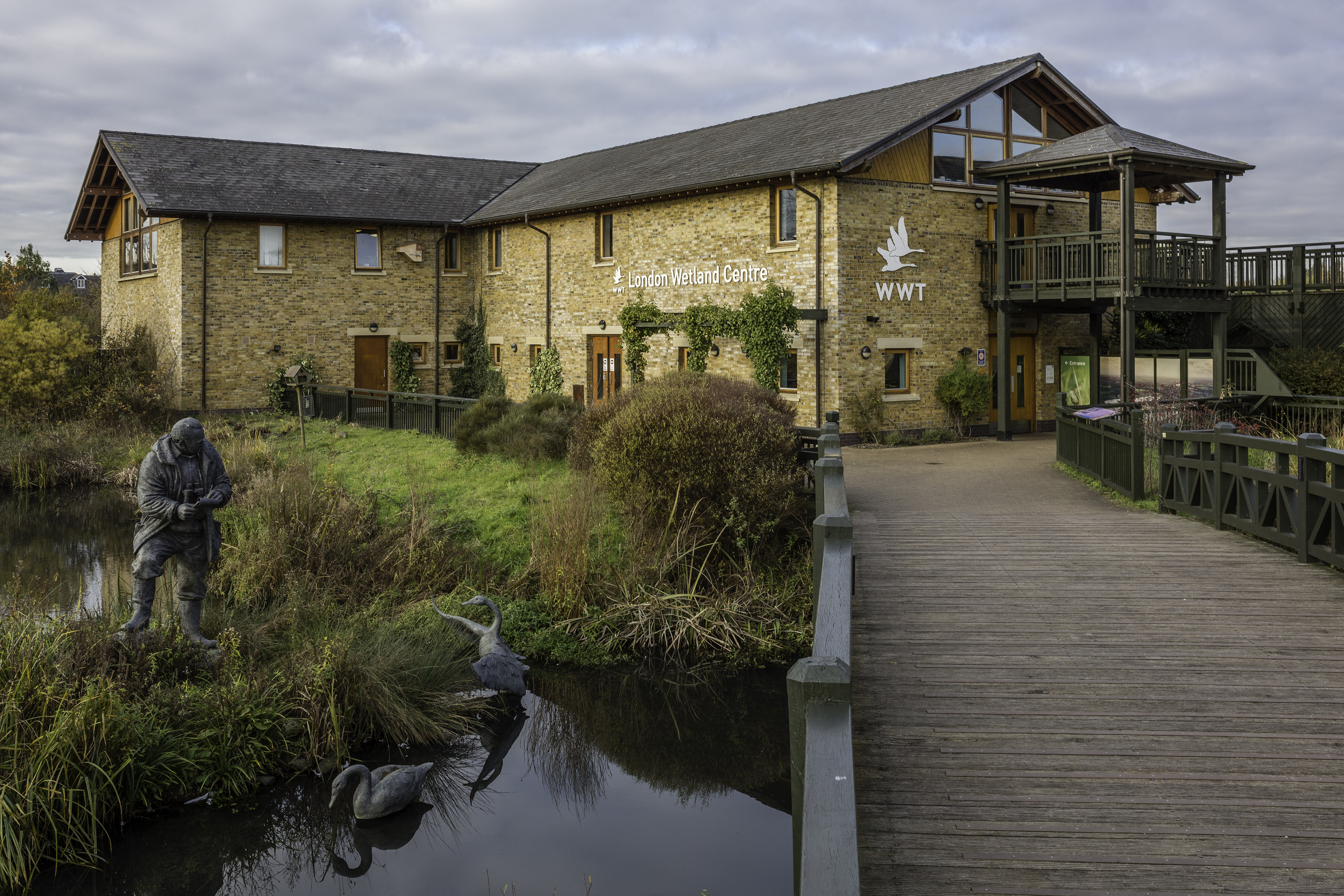
Entrance to the visitors centre at the WWT London Wetland Centre; on the left is the statue of Peter Scott by Nicola Godden

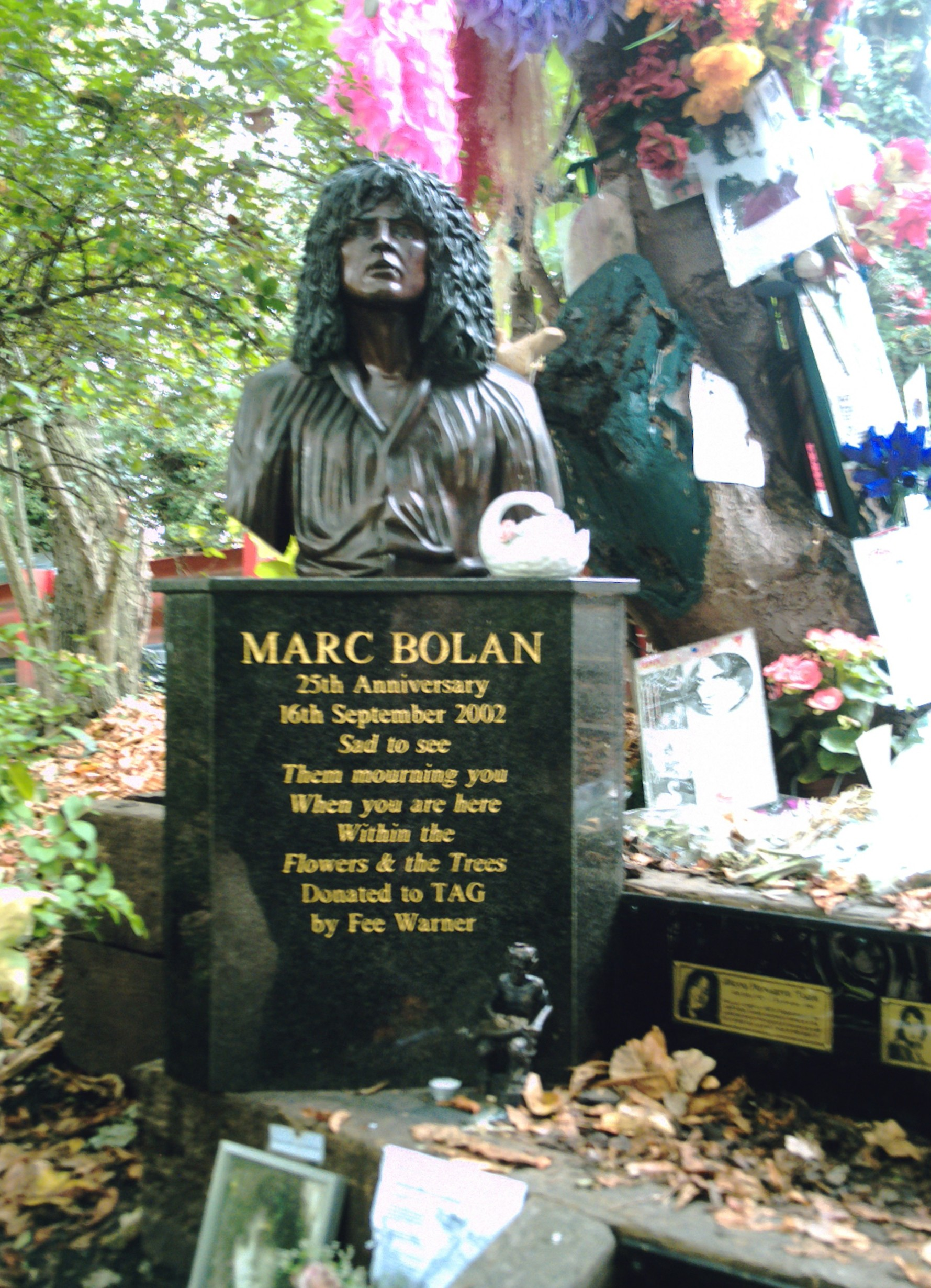
Marc Bolan's shrine, on what would have been his 60th birthday, 30 September 2007

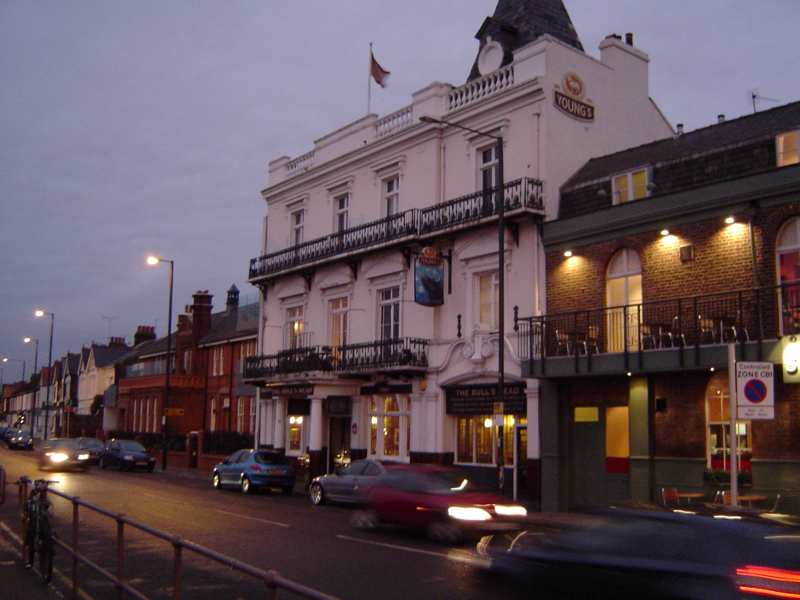
Pub and jazz venue The Bull's Head

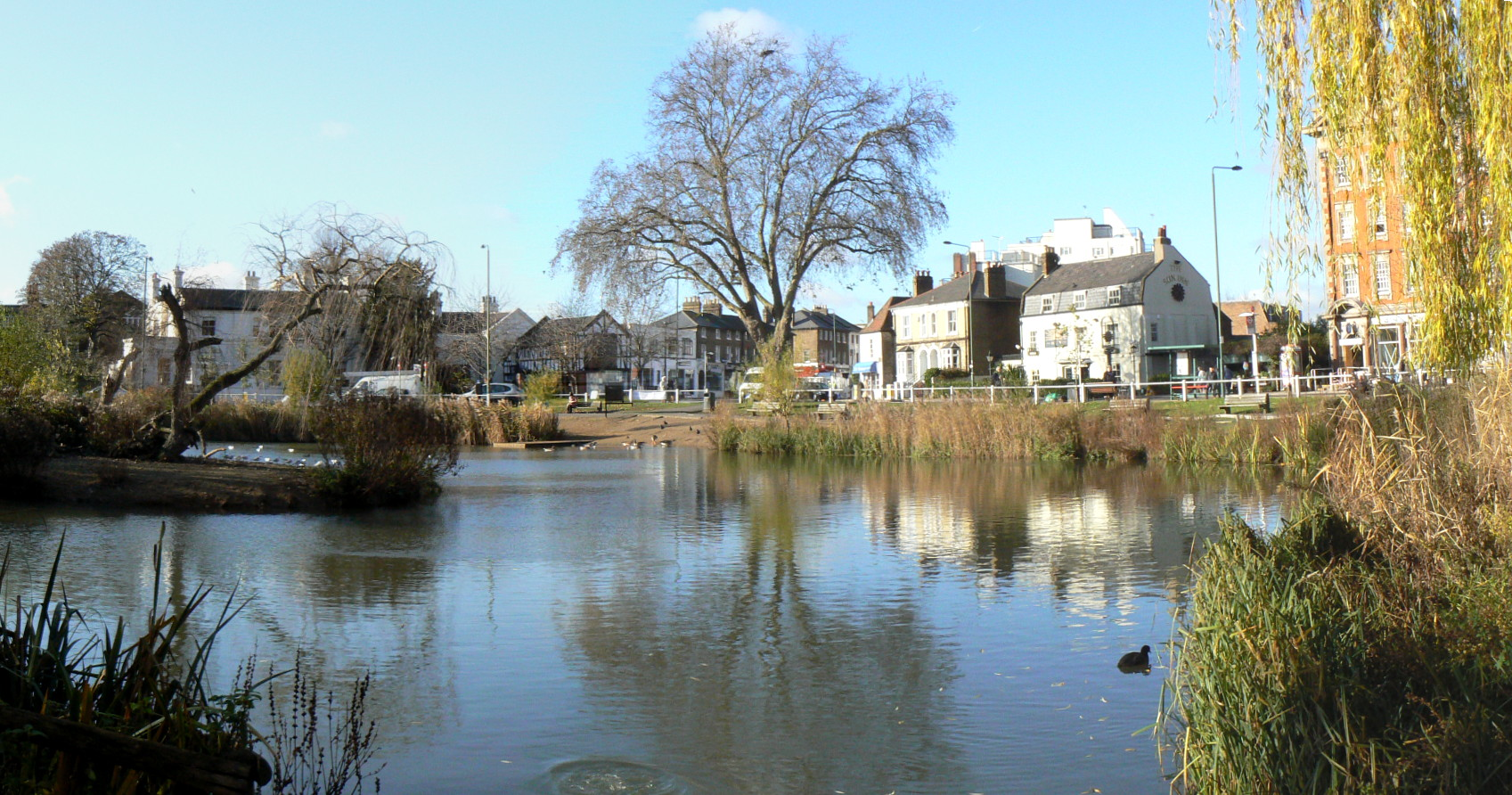
Barnes Pond with the Sun Inn in the background

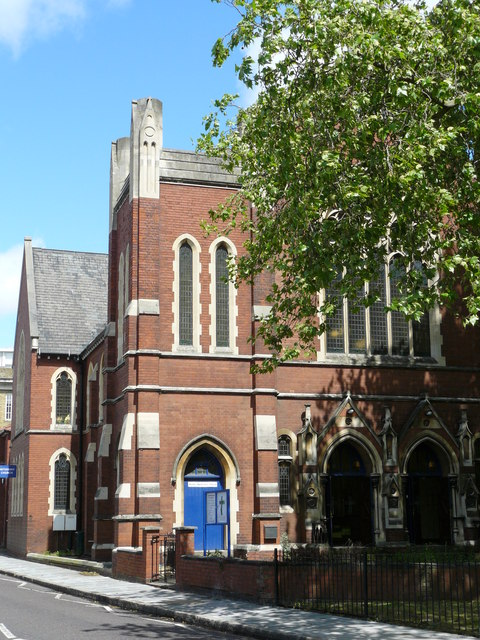
Barnes Methodist Church

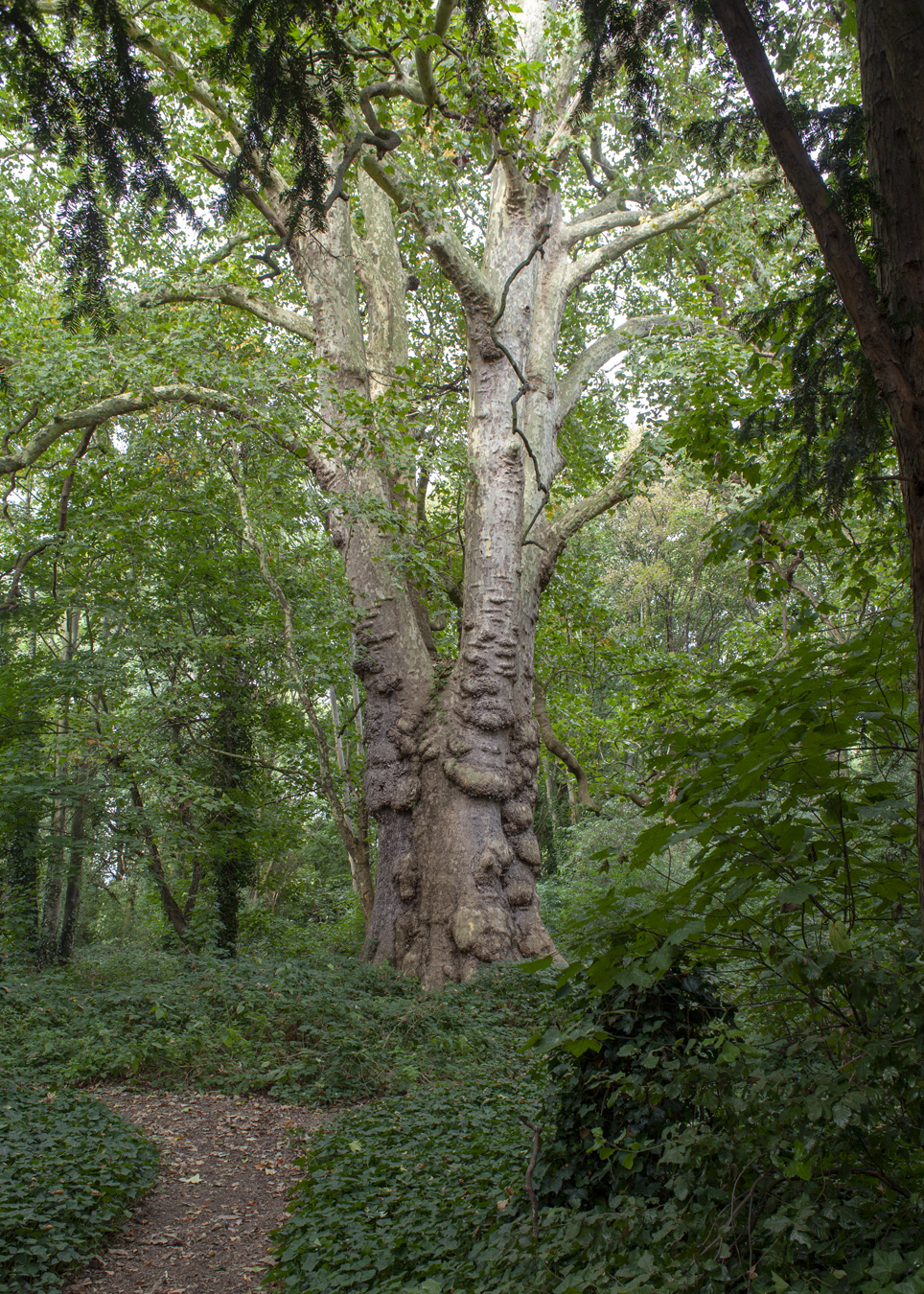
The Barn Elms London plane tree known as "Barney", thought to be the oldest example of the species in London and officially designated a "Great Tree of London"

== See also ==
- Barnes Hospital
- List of residents of Barnes, London
