= 14 The Terrace, Barnes =

Grade II listed house at The Terrace, Barnes, London SW13

Coordinates: 51.472528°N 0.252582°W

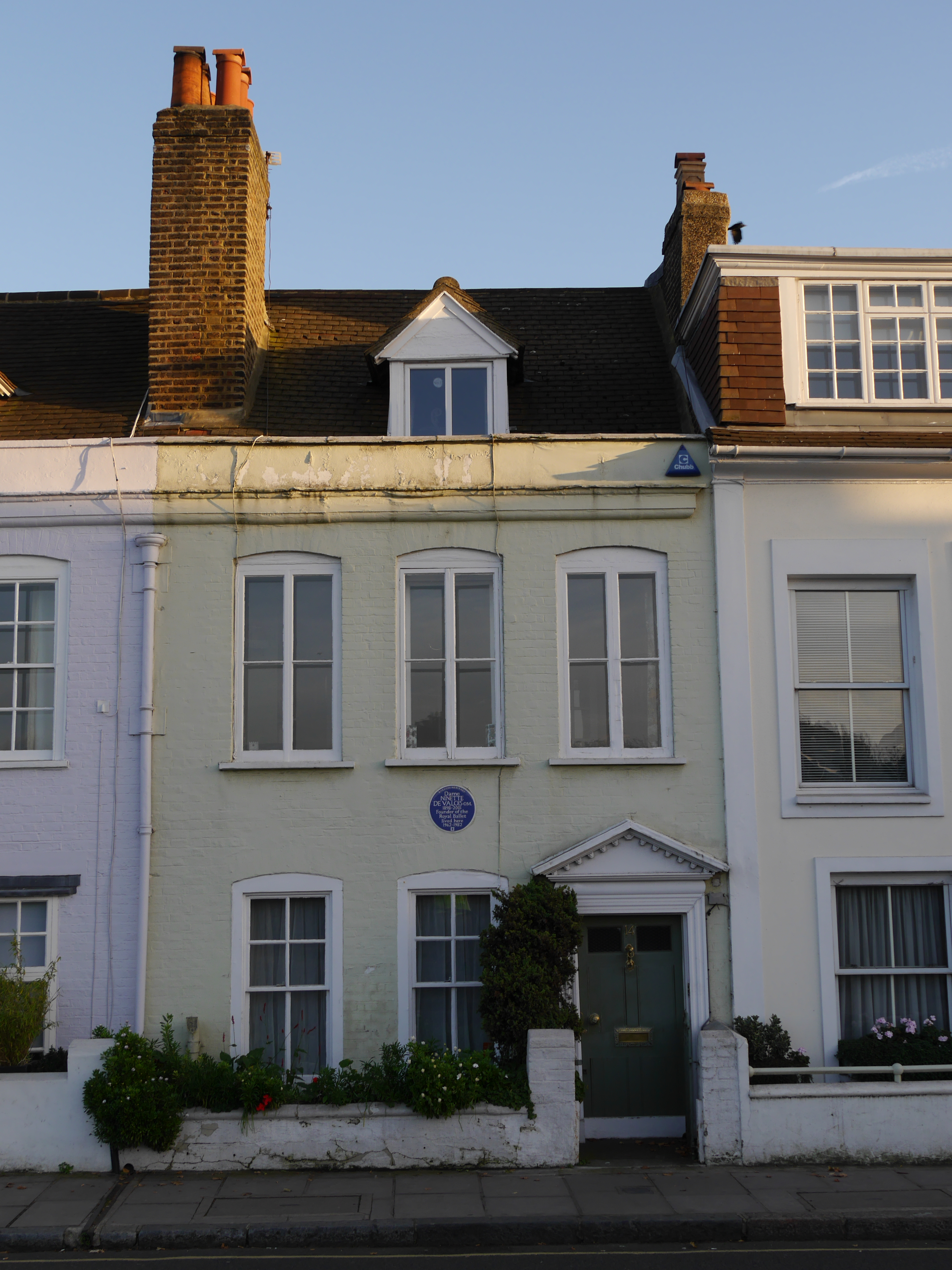
14 The Terrace, Barnes

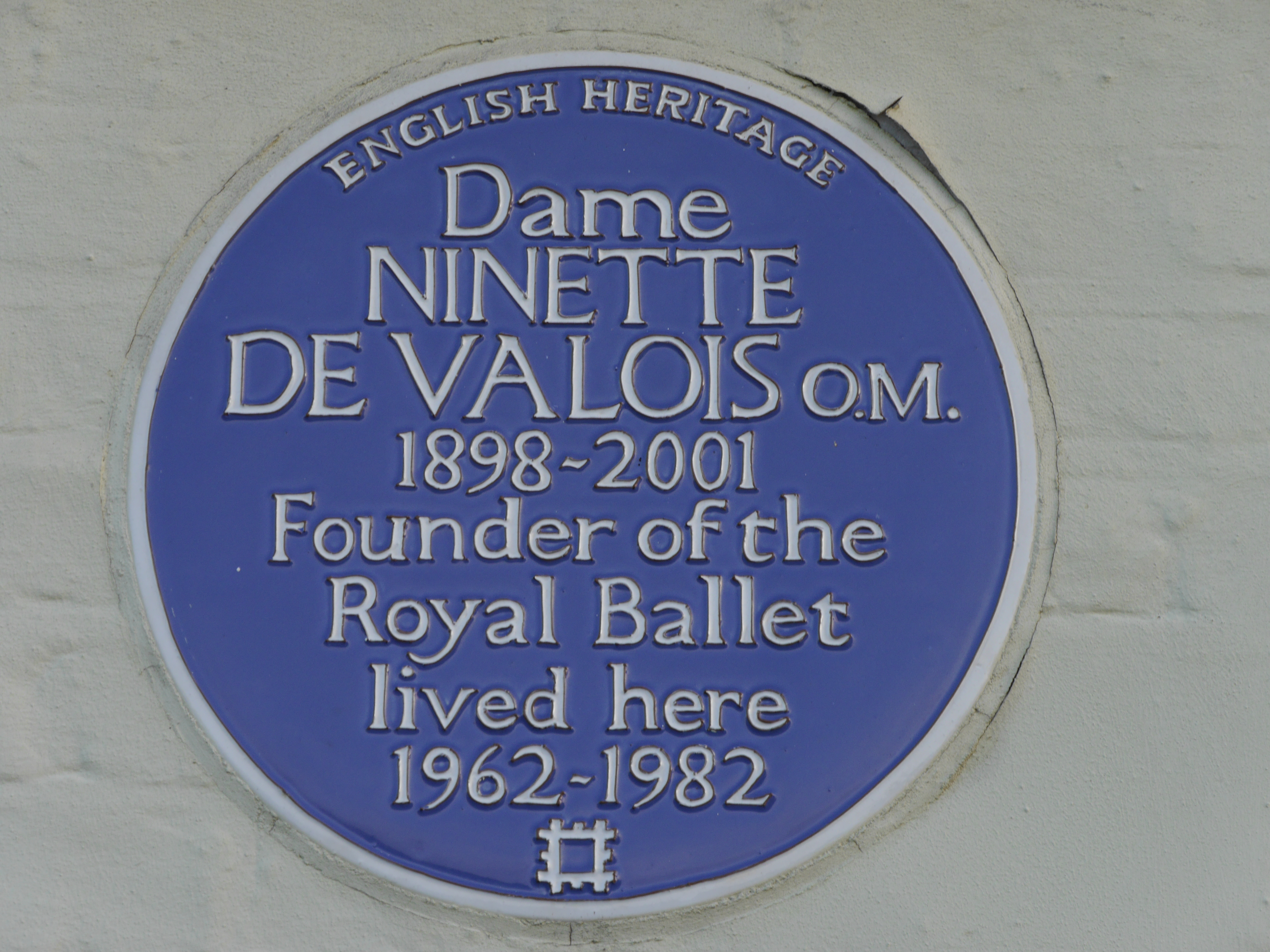
Ninette de Valois blue plaque

14 The Terrace, Barnes is a Grade II listed house at The Terrace, Barnes, London SW13, facing the River Thames, built as one of a pair with No 13 in the mid-eighteenth century.

Dame Ninette de Valois (1898–2001), dancer, teacher, choreographer, and director of classical ballet, lived there from 1962 to 1982. A blue plaque is fixed to the front of the house.
