= St Mary's Church, Barnes =

The Parish Church of St Mary, Barnes
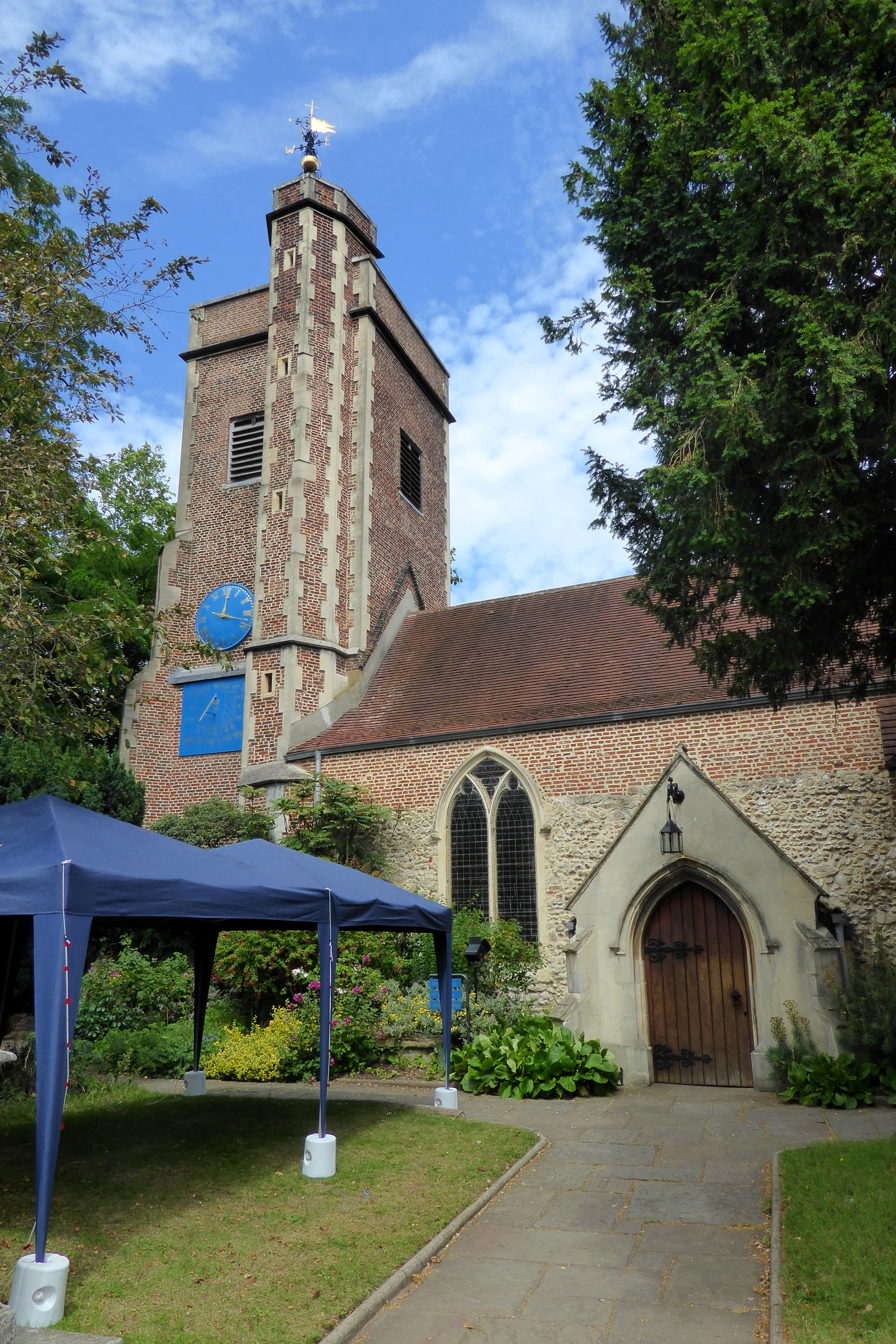

- Location within Surrey
- 51.4751°N 0.2412°W
- Location: Church Road, Barnes, London, SW13 9HL
- Country: England
- Denomination: Church of England
- Churchmanship: Central
- Website: www.stmarybarnes.org

History
- Founded: 1100/1150

Architecture
- Years built: 1100–1150

Administration
- Diocese: Southwark
- Archdeaconry: Wandsworth
- Parish: Barnes

Clergy
- Bishop: Bishop of Southwark
- Rector: The Rev’d Calum Zuckert

Listed Building – Grade II*
- Official name: Church of St Mary
- Designated: 25 October 1951
- Reference no.: 1358083

St Mary's Church, Barnes, is the parish church of Barnes, formerly in Surrey and now in the London Borough of Richmond upon Thames. It is a Grade II* listed building.

St Mary's Barnes is a Christian community with an electoral roll of 250 and links across the local community. Along with the parishes of St Michael and All Angels, Barnes and Holy Trinity Barnes, it has formed the Barnes Team Ministry, with the current Team Rector being The Rev'd Calum Zuckert.

== History ==
The church was built of coursed flint some time between 1100 and 1150. It was enlarged and re-consecrated in 1215, after the signing of Magna Carta, by Cardinal Stephen Langton (c. 1150–1228), who was Archbishop of Canterbury from 1207 to 1228. It was extended to the west in the 13th century, and later to the east, creating a chancel. A west tower was added in the late 15th century. The north wall was demolished in the late 18th century to create a north aisle. The full set of eight bells in the tower was completed in 1897 to commemorate the Diamond Jubilee of Queen Victoria.

A major fire on 8 June 1978 destroyed parts of the church, but left the tower and Norman chapel almost intact. The church was restored by Edward Cullinan with the inclusion of elements of its former structure. The north wall contains a Gothic Revival east window. The church was re-dedicated in February 1984, with the original building now named as the Langton Chapel, commemorating Archbishop Stephen Langton. Doors in memory of Viera Gray were engraved by Josephine Harris.

=== Rectors ===
- 1635–1643 John Cutts (sequestered)
- ——
- 1660–1663† John Squire
- 1663–1680† Edward Layfield
- 1680–1681† Hezekiah Burton
- 1681–1717 William Richardson
- 1717–1727 Francis Hare (as Dean of Worcester, Dean of St Paul's from 1726)
- 1727–1730† Robert Kilborn
- 1730–1749† Samuel Baker
- 1749–1758 John Hume (as Bishop of Bristol from 1756)
- 1758–1768† Ferdinando Warner
- 1768–1792† Christopher Wilson (as Bishop of Bristol from 1783)
- 1792–1795 John Jeffreys
- 1795–1839 John Jeffreys (son of previous)
- 1840–1863 Reginald Edward Copleston
- 1863–1871† Henry Melvill
- 1871–1876 Peter Medd
- 1876–1884 John Ellerton
- 1885–1891† Lewis Taswell Lochee
- 1891–1892† William Anthony Harrison
- 1892–1923† Benjamin Meredyth Kitson
- 1923–1937 William Patrick Dott
- ——
- 1944-? Percy Steed
- 1956–1963 Arthur Christopher Heath
- 1963–1981† Basil Whitworth
- 1981–1990 Juergen Simonson
- 1990–2000 Richard Ames-Lewis
- 2001–2010 Ross Collins
- 2010–2018 Richard Sewell
- 2019–2025 James Hutchings
- 2025–present Calum Zuckert

== Barnes War Memorial ==
In the grounds of the church there is a memorial, unveiled on 19 June 1921, to the men of Barnes who died in service in the First World War. An inscription commemorating the Second World War was added later. The memorial is Grade II listed.

== Notable burials ==
- Major General Roger Elliott (c. 1665–1714), who lived at Byfeld House in Church Road, Barnes, was buried in the churchyard in May 1714.
- John Moody (c. 1727–1812), actor, who lived at 11 The Terrace, Barnes, c.1780 until his death, is buried in the churchyard with his two wives.
- Abiezer Coppe (1619–1672), one of the English Ranters and a writer of prophetic religious pamphlets, is buried in the churchyard.

== Gallery ==
Exterior of the church

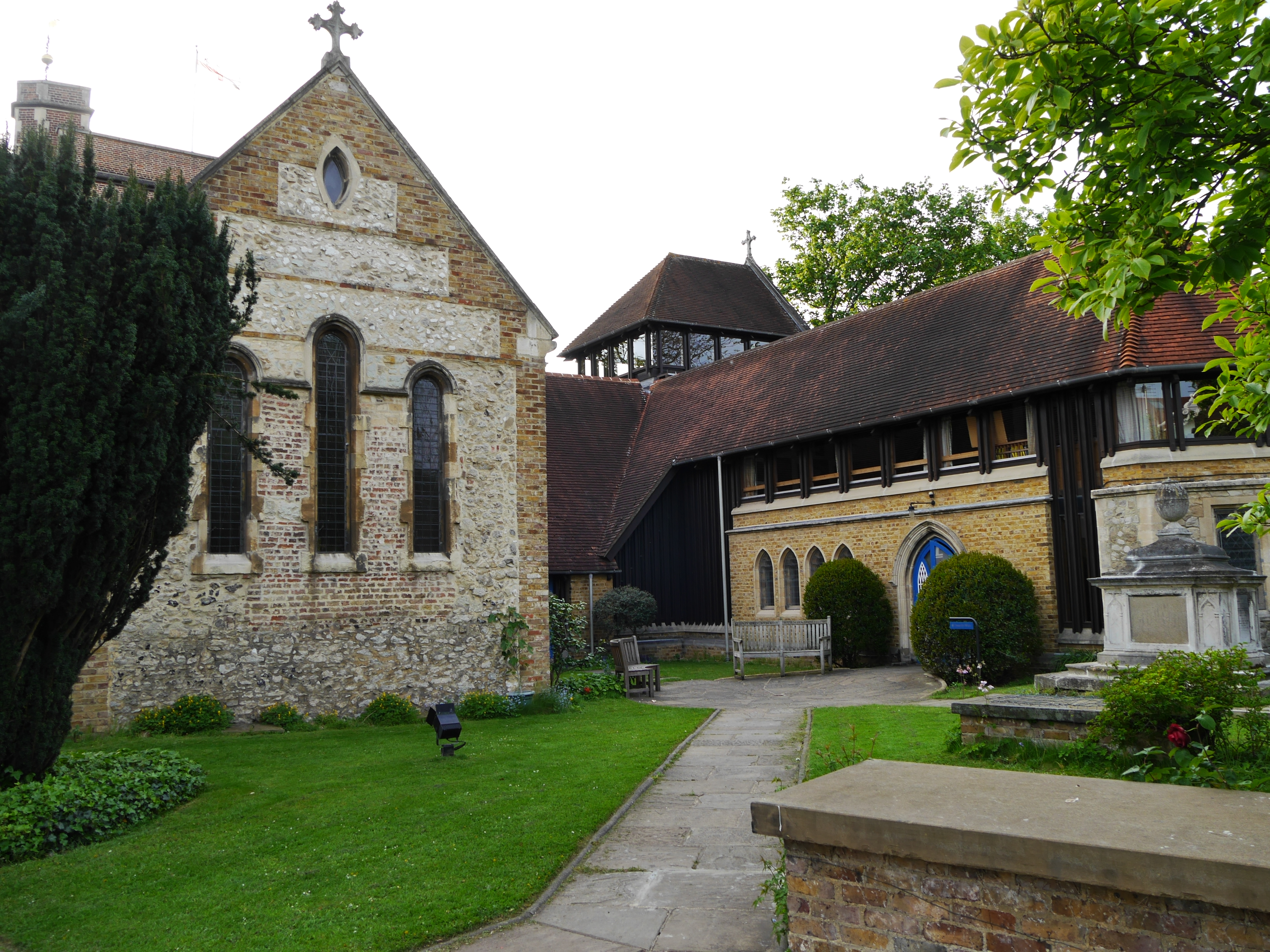
Exterior view

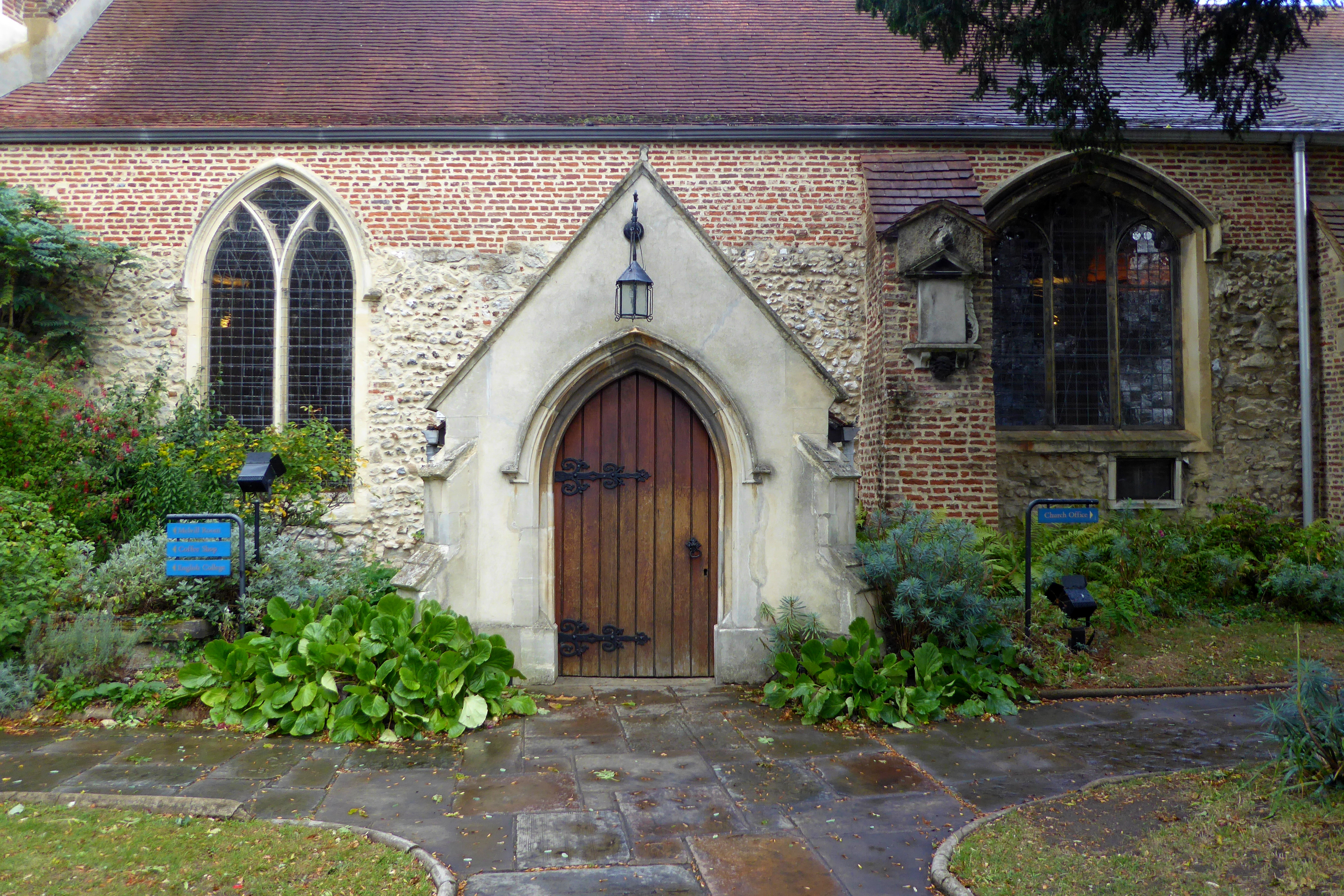
Church entrance

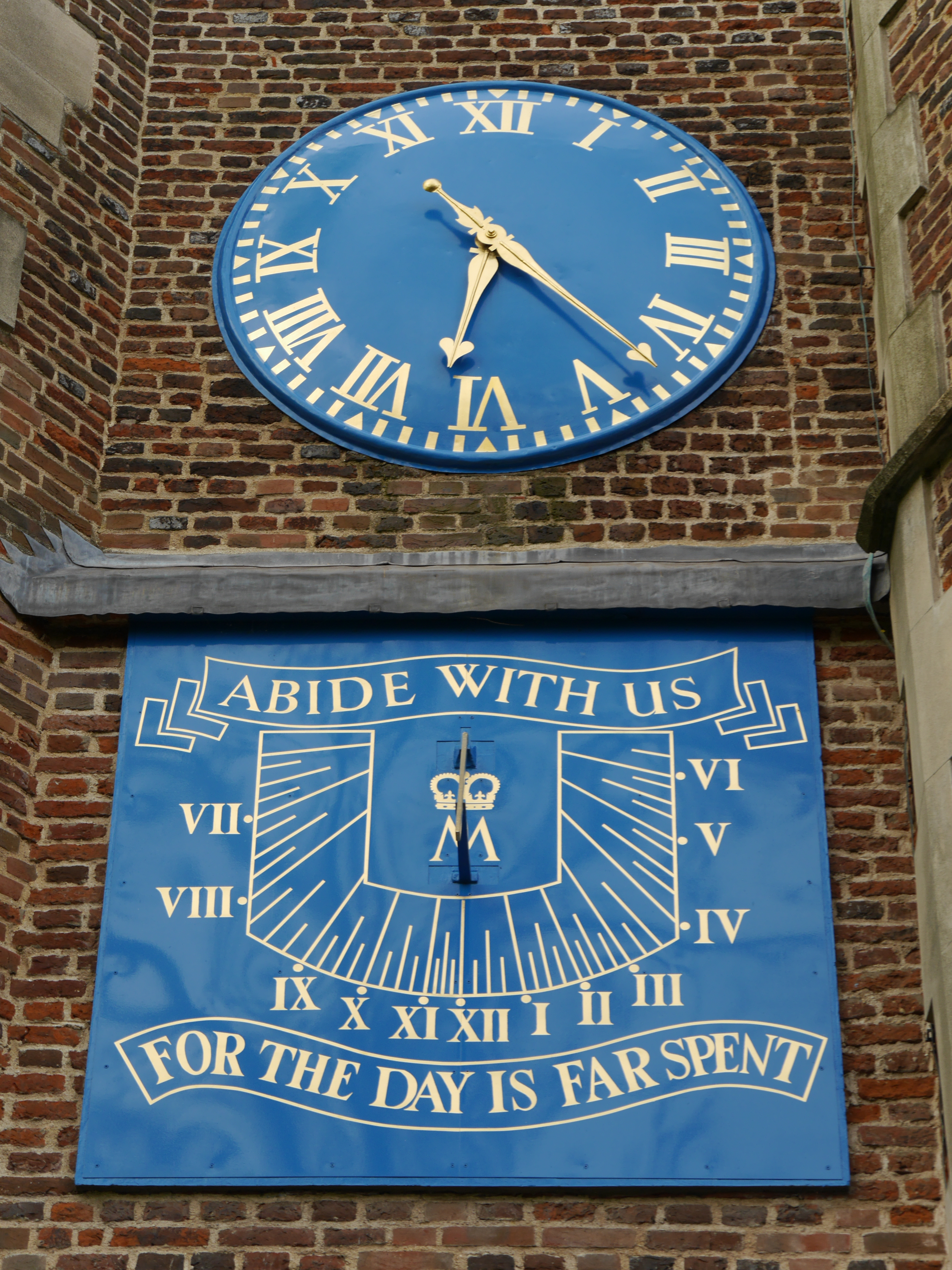
Clock

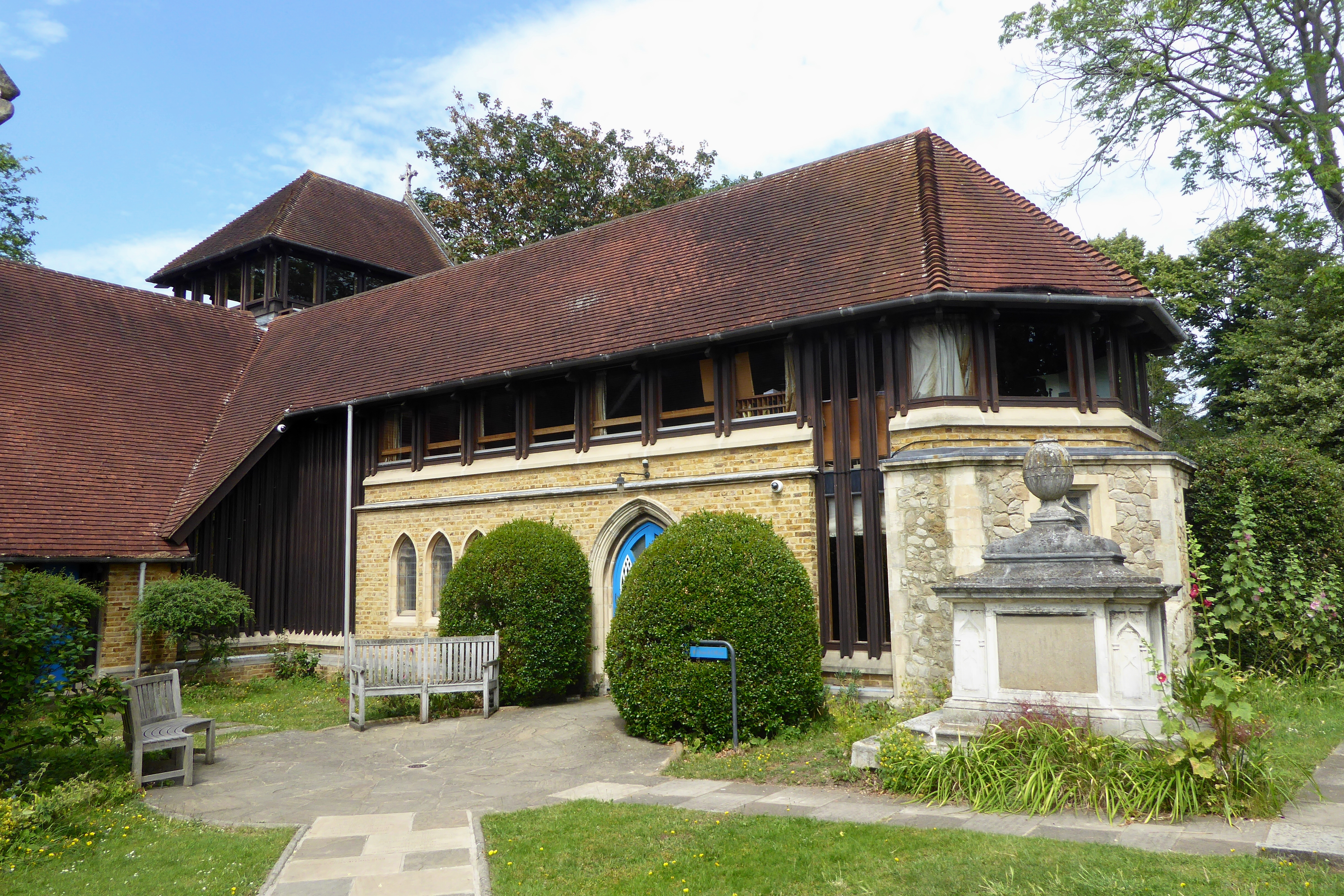
20th-century extension
Interior of the church

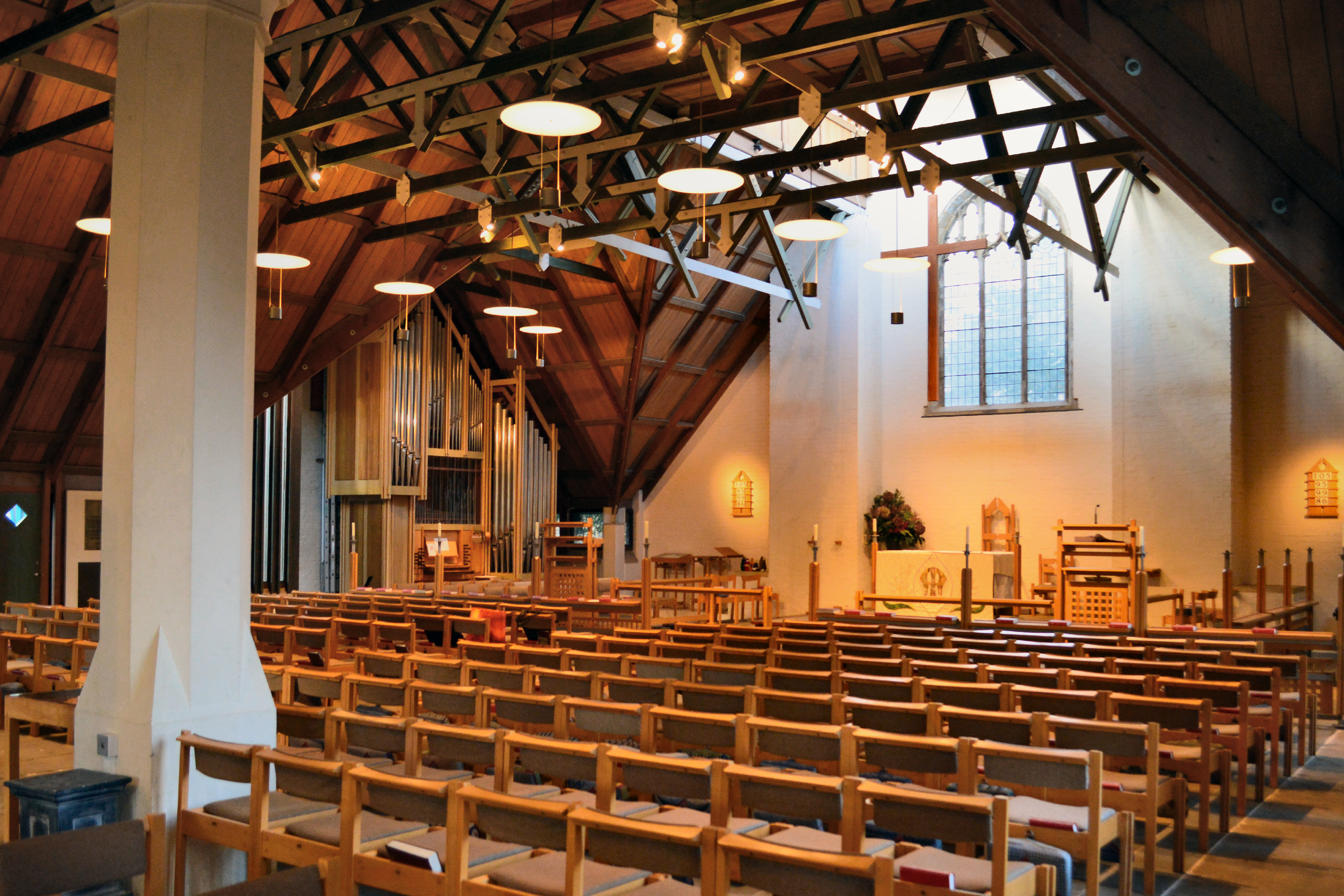
Interior view

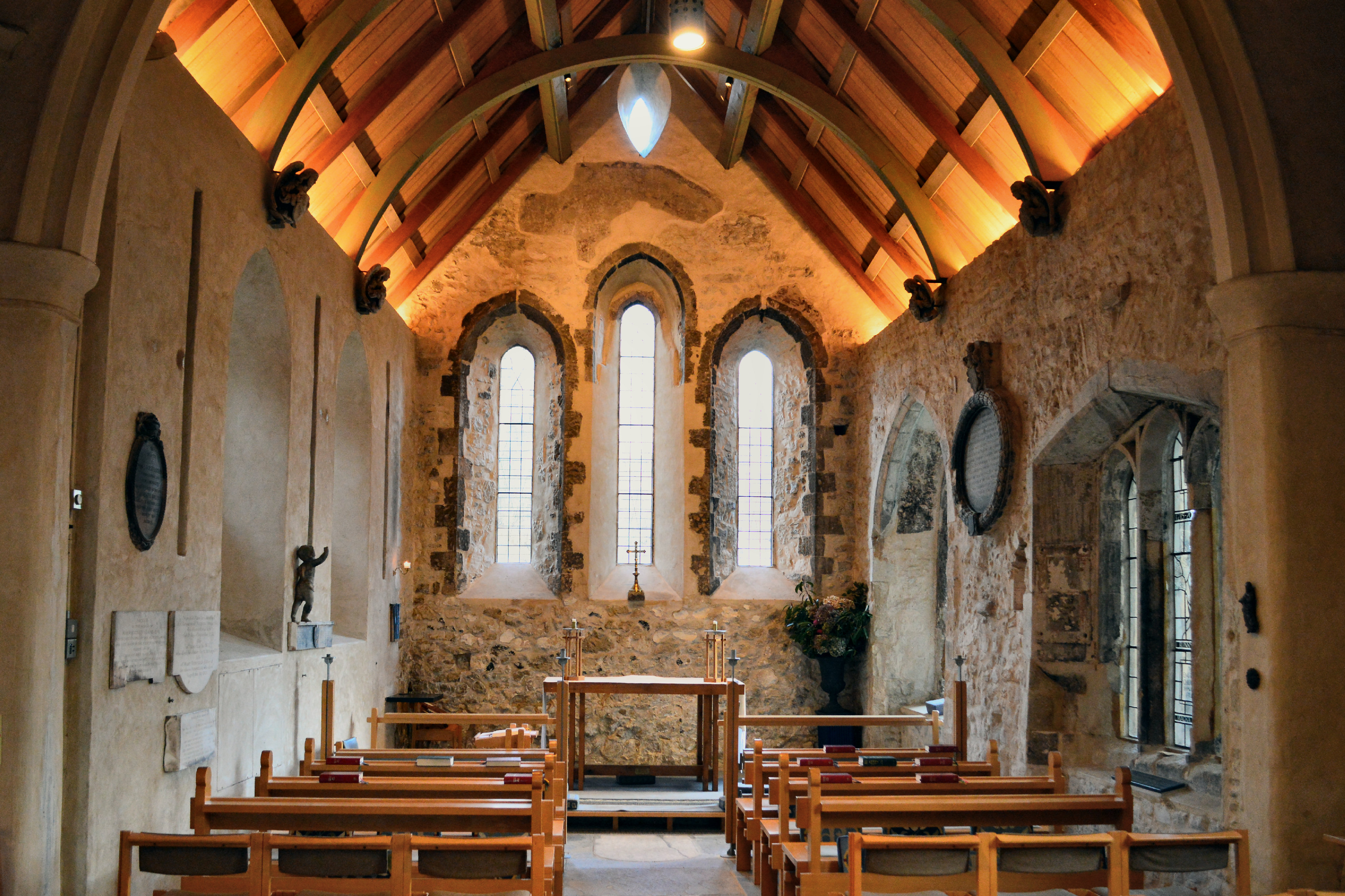
Langton Chapel

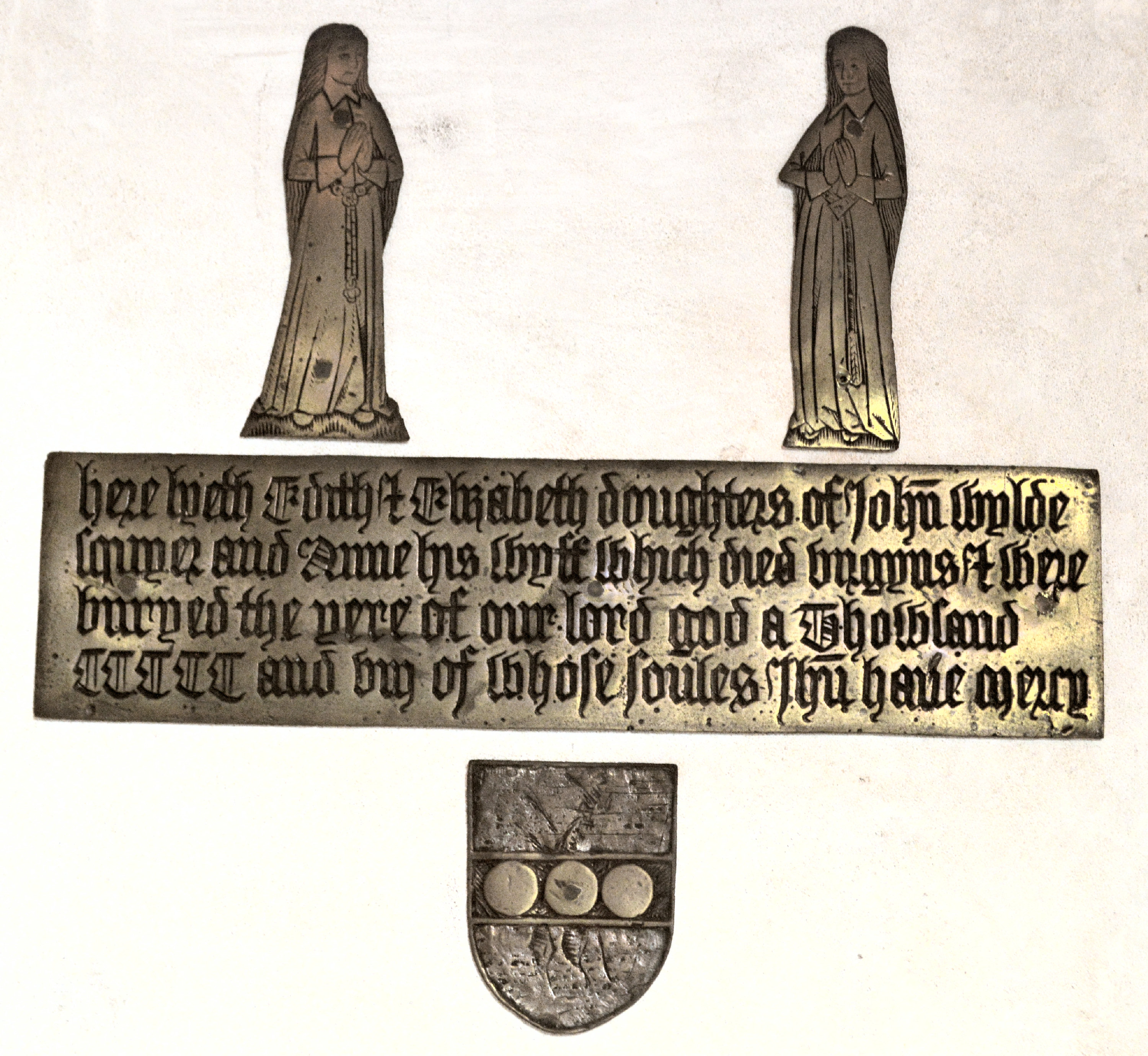
1508 brass monument to Edith and Elizabeth Wylde in Langton Chapel
