= Holy Trinity Barnes =

Coordinates: 51°29′5″N 0°14′1″W

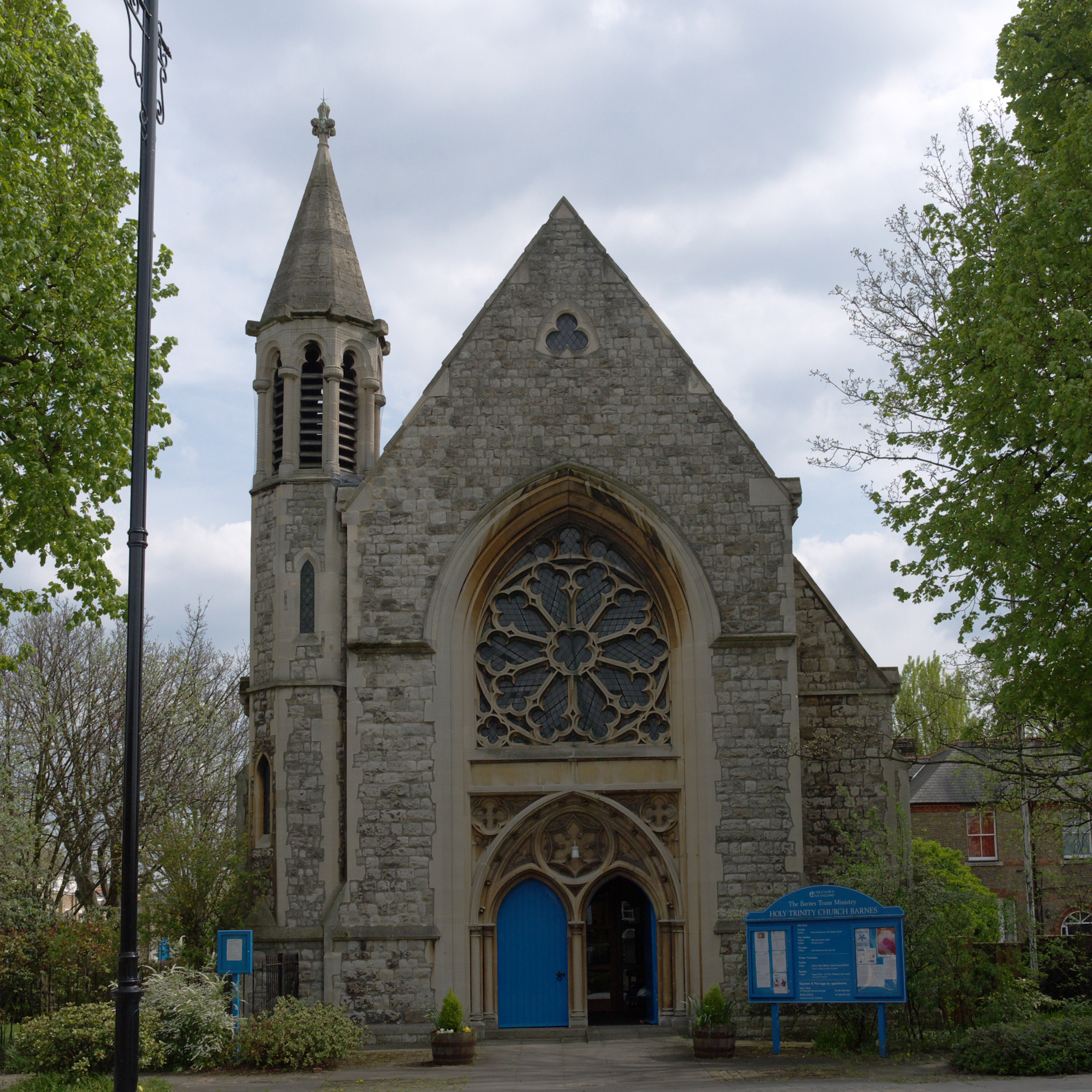
- Holy Trinity Barnes
- Location: 162 Castelnau, Barnes, London SW13 9ET
- Country: England
- Denomination: Church of England
- Website: www.htbarnes.org

Architecture
- Architect: Thomas Allom
- Style: Coursed ragstone
- Years built: 1868

Administration
- Diocese: Anglican Diocese of Southwark
- Archdeaconry: Wandsworth
- Deanery: Richmond & Barnes
- Parish: Barnes, Holy Trinity

Clergy
- Vicar: David Cooke

Holy Trinity Barnes is a Church of England church in Castelnau, Barnes, London.

The building dates from 1868. It was designed by Thomas Allom, an architect and artist who lived locally at 1 Barnes Villas (now 80 Lonsdale Road), Barnes.

The church also has a hall.

There are services on Sundays at 10am.
