= 18 Station Road, Barnes =

House in Richmond upon Thames, England

Coordinates: 51.472733°N 0.247692°W

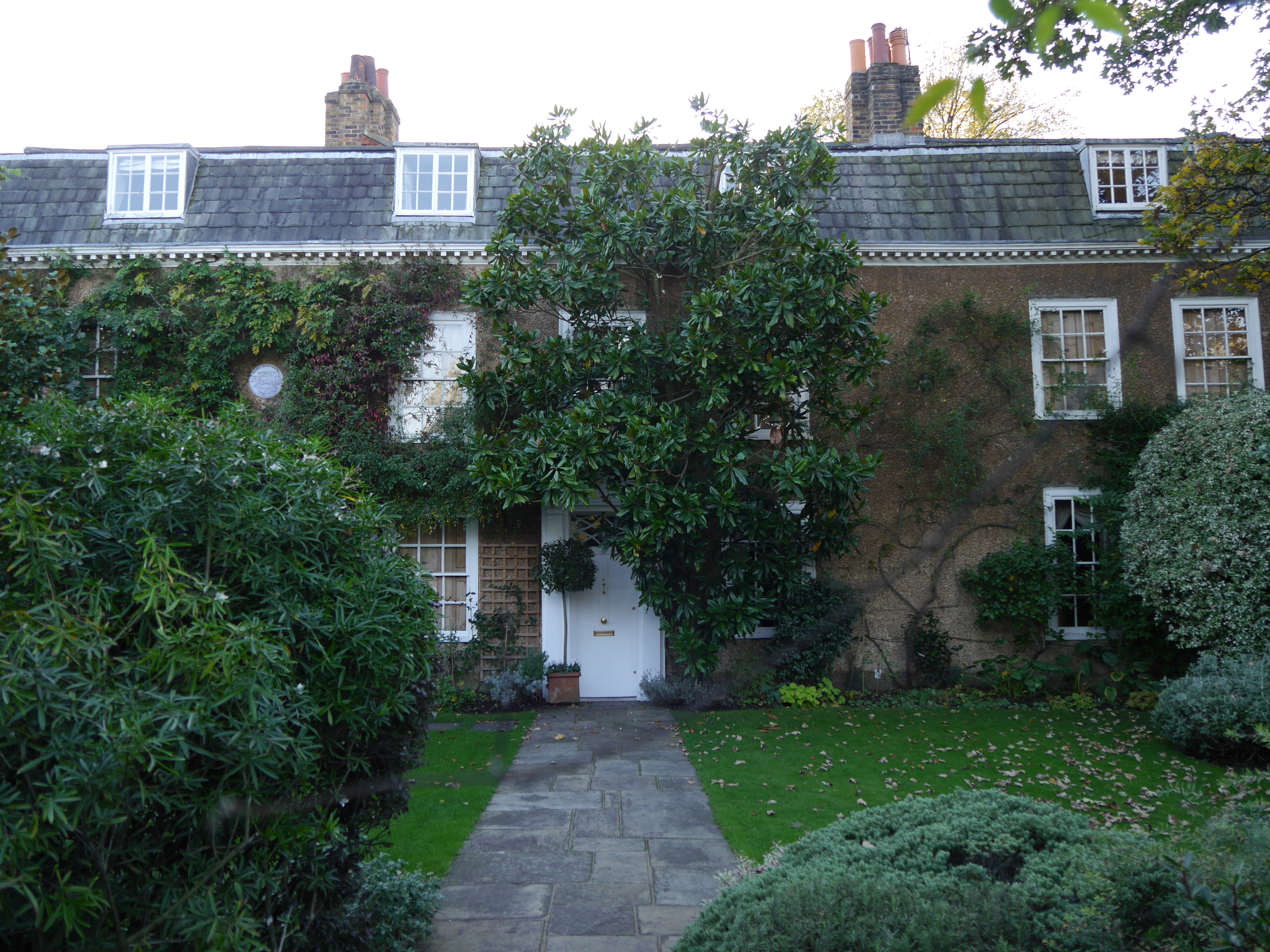
18 Station Road, Barnes, London

18 Station Road, also known as Milbourne House, is a Grade II* listed house at Station Road, Barnes, London SW13, in the London Borough of Richmond upon Thames. It has an early 18th-century facade, and earlier features internally.

It was home to the novelist Henry Fielding in about 1750, for which there is a blue plaque on the facade. Field Marshal James O'Hara, 2nd Baron Tyrawley moved there in 1770.
