= Barnes Hospital, London =

Barnes Hospital
- Shown in Richmond upon Thames

Geography
- Location: East Sheen, London, England, United Kingdom
- Coordinates: 51°28′2″N 0°15′23.3″W

Organisation
- Care system: NHS England
- Type: Mental health

Services
- Emergency department: No Accident & Emergency

History
- Founded: 1889; 137 years ago

Links
- Lists: Hospitals in England

Barnes Hospital, on South Worple Way, East Sheen, in the London Borough of Richmond upon Thames, is a hospital managed by South West London and St George's Mental Health NHS Trust. It provides community and inpatient mental health services.

The hospital was opened in 1889 as The Barnes Isolation Hospital. Its original purpose was to treat and care for patients with infectious diseases such as diphtheria and scarlet fever. The existing buildings were extensively renovated in 2001 when a new extension was added.

Half of the hospital's site was sold to a residential developer in 2019. In September 2020, plans were approved for a health centre and a Special Educational Needs school on the rest of the site: they are due to open in 2027.
