= List of people on the postage stamps of Nigeria =

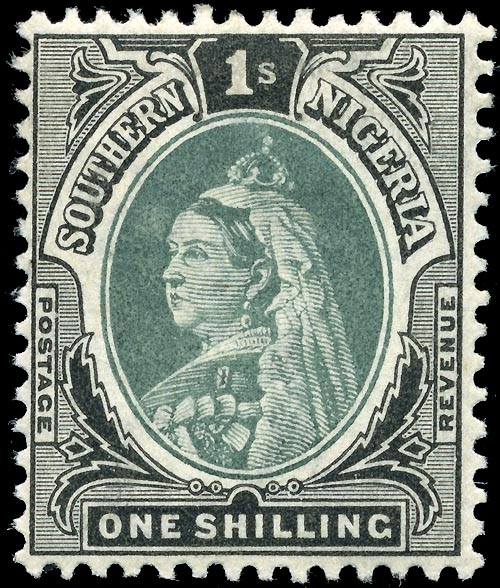
Queen Victoria on a Southern Nigeria Protectorate 1 shilling stamp of 1901.

This is a list of people on the postage stamps of Nigeria and earlier constituent parts, including the years in which they appeared on a stamp.

== Lagos 1874-1906 ==
- Victoria of the United Kingdom (1874)
- Edward VIII of the United Kingdom (1904)

== Niger Coast Protectorate 1894-1898 ==
- Victoria of the United Kingdom (1894)

== Northern Nigeria 1900-1912 ==
- Victoria of the United Kingdom (1900)
- Edward VIII of the United Kingdom (1902)
- George V of the United Kingdom (1912)

== Oil Rivers 1892-1893 ==
- Victoria of the United Kingdom (1892)

== Southern Nigeria 1901-1912 ==
- Victoria of the United Kingdom (1901)
- Edward VIII of the United Kingdom (1903)

== Nigeria 1914-1960 ==
- Elizabeth II of the United Kingdom (1953–1958)
- George V of the United Kingdom (1914–1936)
- George VI of the United Kingdom (1937–1948)

== Nigeria Independent 1960+ ==
- Nnamdi Azikiwe (1963, 1964)
- Robert Baden-Powell (1965, 1982)
- Alexander Graham Bell (1976)
- Yakubu Gowon (1969)
- Jaja of Opobo (1964)
- John F. Kennedy (1964)
- Christian J. Kiewiet (1914, 1988)
- Herbert Macaulay (1964)
- Murtala Muhammed (1977)
- Nefertari (1964)
- Wright brothers (1978)
- Philip Emeagwali (2006)

== Biafra 1968-1969 ==
- Pope Paul VI (1969)

== See also ==
- Nigerian Postal Service
- Postage stamps and postal history of Lagos
- Postage stamps and postal history of Nigeria
- Postage stamps and postal history of the Niger Coast Protectorate
- Postage stamps and postal history of the Niger Territories
- Postage stamps and postal history of the Northern Nigeria Protectorate
- Postage stamps and postal history of the Oil Rivers Protectorate
- Postage stamps and postal history of the Southern Nigeria Protectorate
