= Revenue stamps of Nigeria =

Few revenue stamps of Nigeria and its predecessor states have been issued, since most of the time dual-purpose postage and revenue stamps were used for fiscal purposes. The first revenue-only stamps were consular stamps of the Niger Coast Protectorate and the Southern Nigeria Protectorate, which were created by overprinting postage stamps in 1898 and 1902 respectively. The Northern Nigeria Protectorate did not issue any specific revenue stamps, but a £25 stamp of 1904 could not be used for postal purposes due to its extremely high face value.

When these protectorates were merged into the Colony and Protectorate of Nigeria, a series of rare revenue stamps was issued. Lagos issued a single tax stamp in 1938, and the Eastern Region issued income tax and revenue stamps in the 1950s. Nigeria also issued Passenger Service Charge stamps in the 1980s and a Stamp Duty stamp in 2006. Nigeria also used impressed duty stamps, and proofs for issues for Southern Nigeria and the Western State are also known.

== Pre-unification ==
=== Niger Coast ===
In 1898, postage stamps of the Niger Coast depicting Queen Victoria were overprinted CONSULAR for fiscal use.

=== Northern Nigeria ===
Northern Nigeria's stamps were inscribed POSTAGE & REVENUE so they were valid for both postal and fiscal use; consequently Northern Nigeria never issued any revenue-only stamps. However, a £25 stamp depicting King Edward VII was issued in 1904 and it was intended to be used fiscally for liquor licences. Although the stamp does bear the word "postage", the face value was so high that it could not be possibly used for postal purposes. Other high values such as the £1 stamp of 1912 were also mainly intended for fiscal use.

=== Southern Nigeria ===
In 1902, postage stamps depicting Queen Victoria were overprinted CONSULAR in red for fiscal purposes. Otherwise, dual-purpose postage and revenue stamps were used. The £1 high values were mainly intended for fiscal rather than postal use.

Proofs of impressed duty stamps for Southern Nigeria dated 1908 are known.

== Colony and Protectorate of Nigeria ==
Nigeria usually used dual-purpose postage and revenue stamps for fiscal use, and consequently very few revenue-only stamps were issued. A set of key type stamps depicting King George V was issued in 1916, and some values were reissued with a new watermark in 1920. These stamps are very scarce to extremely rare.

Nigeria used various impressed duty stamps during the colonial period.

=== Lagos ===
A single numeral stamp inscribed LAGOS TAX STAMP was issued in 1938.

=== Eastern Nigeria ===
The Eastern Region of Nigeria briefly issued its own stamps in the 1950s. Some Nigerian postage stamps were overprinted EASTERN REGION INCOME TAX and a new value. In around 1956–57, two sets of numeral stamps were issued inscribed EASTERN NIGERIA REVENUE. All the Eastern Region's revenue stamps are scarce or rare.

=== Western Nigeria ===
Proofs of impressed duty stamps for the Western State of Nigeria are known dated 1953.

== Federal Republic of Nigeria ==
In the 1980s, stamps depicting an airport were issued to pay the Passenger Service Charge.

A Stamp Duty stamp was issued in 2006.

== See also ==
- Postage stamps and postal history of Nigeria
- Postage stamps and postal history of Lagos
- Postage stamps and postal history of the Niger Coast Protectorate
- Postage stamps and postal history of the Northern Nigeria Protectorate
- Postage stamps and postal history of the Southern Nigeria Protectorate
