= Senegal Company =

The Senegal Company (French: Compagnie du Sénégal) may refer to:

- Compagnie du Sénégal (lit. "Company of the Senegal"), a 17th-century chartered company which administered French Senegal
- Compagnie du Sénégal et de la Côte occidentale d'Afrique (lit. "Company of the Senegal and West Coast of Africa"), a private 19th-century company involved in the Nigerian palm oil trade
