= Postage stamps and postal history of the Niger Coast Protectorate =

This is a survey of the postage stamps and postal history of the Niger Coast Protectorate.

The Niger Coast Protectorate was a British protectorate in the Oil Rivers area of present-day Nigeria. It was originally established as the Oil Rivers Protectorate in 1884 and confirmed at the Berlin Conference the following year. It was renamed the Niger Coast Protectorate on 12 May 1893, and merged with the chartered territories of the Royal Niger Company on 1 January 1900 to form the Southern Nigeria Protectorate.

== Oil Rivers Protectorate ==
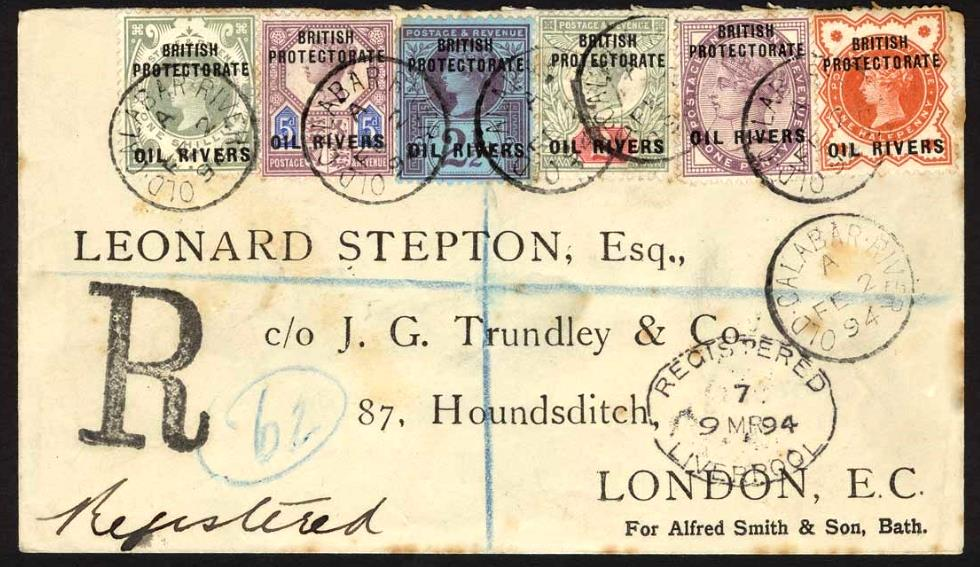
An 1894 letter from Old Calabar in the Oil Rivers Protectorate

The main post office was established at Old Calabar in November 1891; sub-offices existed at Benin, Bonny, Brass, Opobo, and Warri. Initially the postage stamps of Britain were used; in July 1892 they were overprinted with "BRITISH / PROTECTORATE / OIL / RIVERS". A pressing need for halfpenny values in mid-1893 resulted in a variety of surcharges on 2d and 2 1/2d stamps. While most simply read "HALF / PENNY", with a horizontal bar to obliterate the old value, some were overprinted "1/2 d" twice, with the intent that they be bisected diagonally to produce two 1/2d stamps.

== Niger Coast Protectorate ==
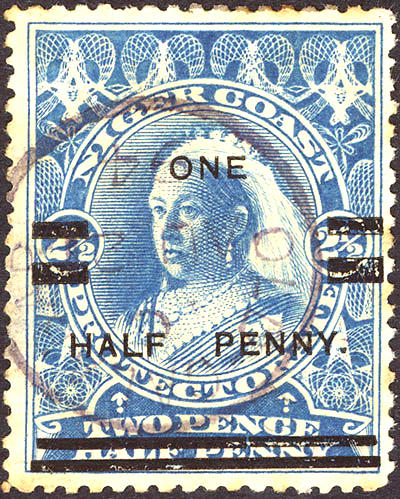
A two pence stamp of Niger Coast surcharged to one halfpenny and used at Old Calabar in 1894

A name change occurred just as new stamps were being prepared, and so the first issue of the Niger Coast Protectorate, featuring a 3/4 portrait of Queen Victoria, was inscribed "OIL RIVERS" but obliterated and re-engraved "NIGER COAST" in a way which makes it look like an overprint. Available in November 1893 in six denominations with various colors, they were superseded the following May by stamps in a new design and the correct inscription. This design continued for the remainder of the protectorate's existence, with a change over to use the "Crown & CA" watermark from 1897 onwards (the paper had previously been unwatermarked) and an additional three denominations.

Stamps of the Niger Coast Protectorate were superseded by those of Southern Nigeria Protectorate from January 1900

== See also ==
- Postage stamps and postal history of Nigeria
- Postage stamps and postal history of the Southern Nigeria Protectorate
- Revenue stamps of the Niger Coast

== References and sources ==
References

- Thomas Pakenham, The Scramble for Africa (Random House, 1991), pp. 197–199

Sources

- Rossiter, Stuart & John Flower. The Stamp Atlas. London: Macdonald, 1986. ISBN 0-356-10862-7
- Stanley Gibbons catalogues.
