= The Homestead, Barnes =

Coordinates: 51.475155°N 0.241249°W

The Homestead
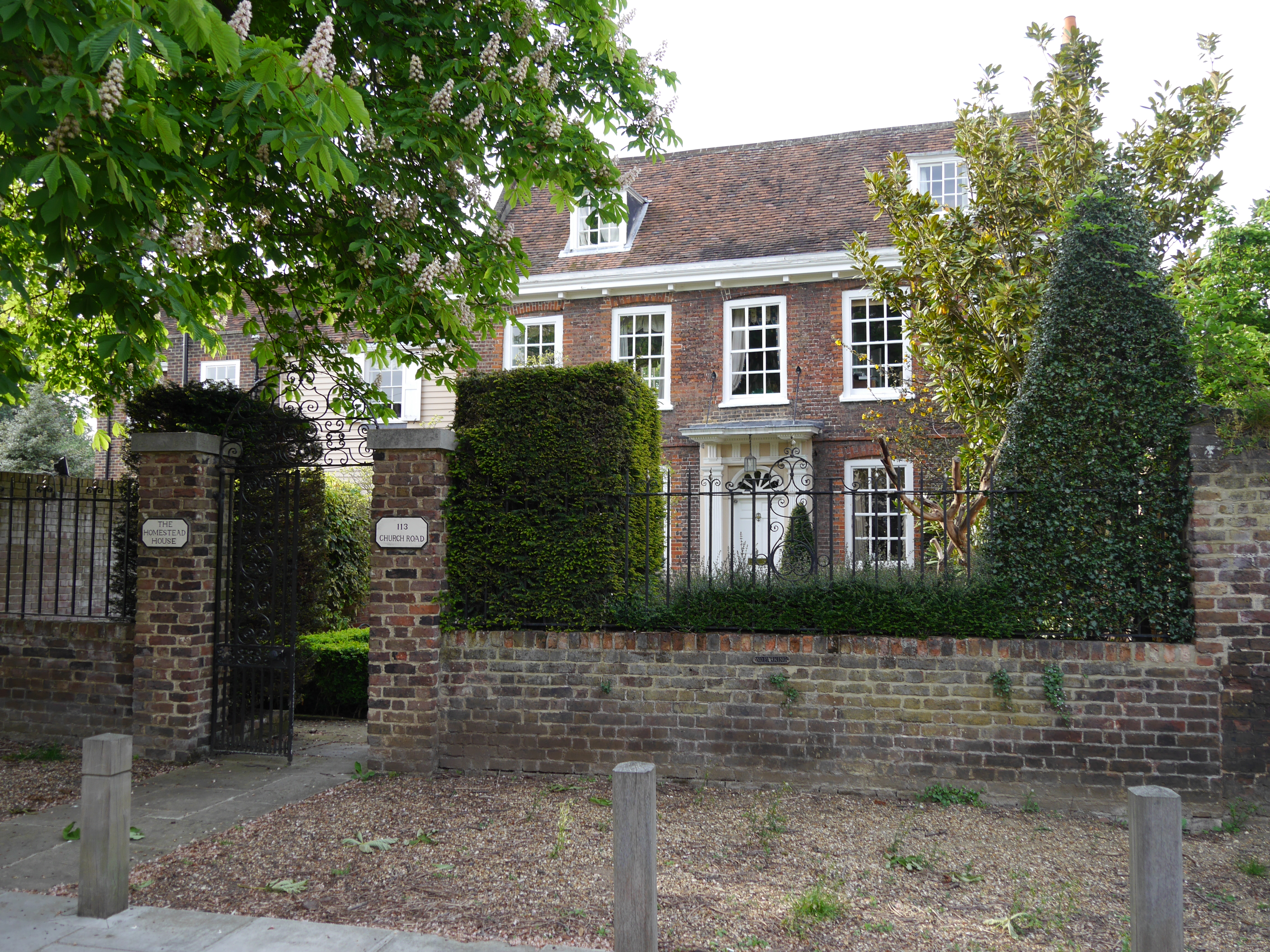

- Location within London Borough of Richmond upon Thames

General information
- Type: House
- Location: 113 Church Road, Barnes, London SW13 in the London Borough of Richmond upon Thames

Listed Building – Grade II
- Official name: The Homestead Wall and Railings on Road Frontage
- Designated: 25 October 1951
- Reference no.: 1191889

The Homestead is a Grade II listed house at Church Road, Barnes, London SW13, built in about 1720.

== Notable residents ==
The Scottish physician, librarian, and medical historian Robert Willis lived and practised there from 1846 until his death in 1878.

Sir Ralph Moor, high commissioner of the British Southern Nigeria Protectorate poisoned himself there in 1909. The coroner's jury determined that "the poison was deliberately taken whilst temporarily insane after suffering acutely from insomnia", having heard evidence that Moor had suffered for the last four years on his return from Africa with malarial and backwater fever that induced insomnia.
