= Postage stamps and postal history of Nigeria =

This is a survey of the postage stamps and postal history of Nigeria.

== First stamps ==
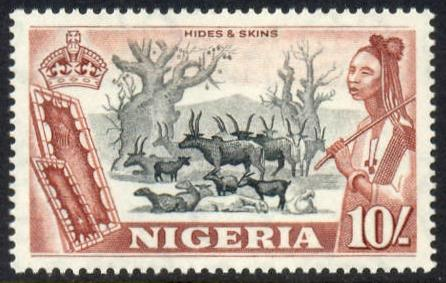
A 1953 stamp of Nigeria

The first stamps for Nigeria were issued on 1 June 1914 following the amalgamation of all of the British colonies in the area (Northern Nigeria Protectorate and Southern Nigeria Protectorate). The first stamps were the standard King George V Empire keytype, which was also previously used for the issues of Northern Nigeria.

== Federation and Republic ==
The first issue of independent Nigeria was issued on 1 October 1960, following with a definitive issued on 1 January 1961. In 1963 Nigeria became a Republic within the British Commonwealth and a new definitive set was issued on 1 November 1965.

== Cameroons U.K.T.T. ==
Between 1960 and 1961 Nigerian definitives of 1953-57 were overprinted "CAMEROONS/U.K.T.T." for use in Southern Cameroons of the British Mandate territory of British Cameroons. This issue was also valid for use in Northern Cameroons until it joined Nigeria. In 1961, Southern Cameroons became part of Cameroon.

== Biafra ==
Between 30 May 1967 and 15 January 1970, the region of Biafra attempted to secede from Nigeria and issued their own postage stamps. Eventually, after the bloody Nigerian Civil War they rejoined Nigeria.

== See also ==
- List of people on stamps of Nigeria
- Nigerian Postal Service
- Postage stamps and postal history of Lagos
- Postage stamps and postal history of the Oil Rivers Protectorate
- Postage stamps and postal history of the Niger Coast Protectorate
- Postage stamps and postal history of the Niger Territories
- Postage stamps and postal history of the Northern Nigeria Protectorate
- Postage stamps and postal history of the Southern Nigeria Protectorate
- Postage stamps and postal history of Biafra
- Revenue stamps of Nigeria
