= Société française de l'Afrique équatoriale =

19th-century colonial French company

The Société française de l'Afrique équatoriale (French for "the French Equatorial African Association"), fully the Société française de l'Afrique équatoriale, Niger, et Benoué, was a 19th-century colonial French company involved in the palm oil trade in Nigeria.

The company was founded in 1878 by the Parisian firm Huchet & Desprez with a capitalization of 800 000 F. It first agents in Nigeria was the explorer Charles, Comte de Semellé (1815–1896); after his retirement in 1880, he was succeeded by Commandant Mattei of the French army. Along with the Senegal Company, the SFAE received subsidies from the Léon Gambetta administration and was intended to establish French claims on the lower Niger. At its height, it operated 19 trading posts along the Niger and Benue rivers. Following a years-long price war and Gambetta's death in 1882, the company sold its interests in the region to the British United African Company in October 1884.
