= Robert Willis (physician) =

Scottish physician, librarian, and medical historian

- Born: 1799; Leith, Edinburgh, Scotland
- Died: 21 September 1878 (aged 78–79); Barnes, London
- Education: University of Edinburgh
- Occupations: Librarian; Medical historian
- Medical career
- Field: Physician

Robert Willis (1799 – 21 September 1878) was a Scottish physician, librarian, and medical historian.

== Education ==
Willis was born in Leith, Edinburgh, Scotland. His father, Robert Willis, was a wine merchant, married to Agnes (née Hay). He was educated at the High School of Edinburgh, where he formed a lifelong friendship with his contemporary James Syme, who would become a surgeon and marry one of Willis's sisters, Ann(e) (died 1840). Their daughter, Robert's niece, Agnes Syme Lister, became a botanist and married the pioneer of antiseptic surgery, Joseph Lister.

== Work as a librarian (1828–1845) ==
Willis compiled a catalogue of the books of the College of Surgeons which was published in 1831 (Cope, 1959)

== Medical practice (1846–1878) ==
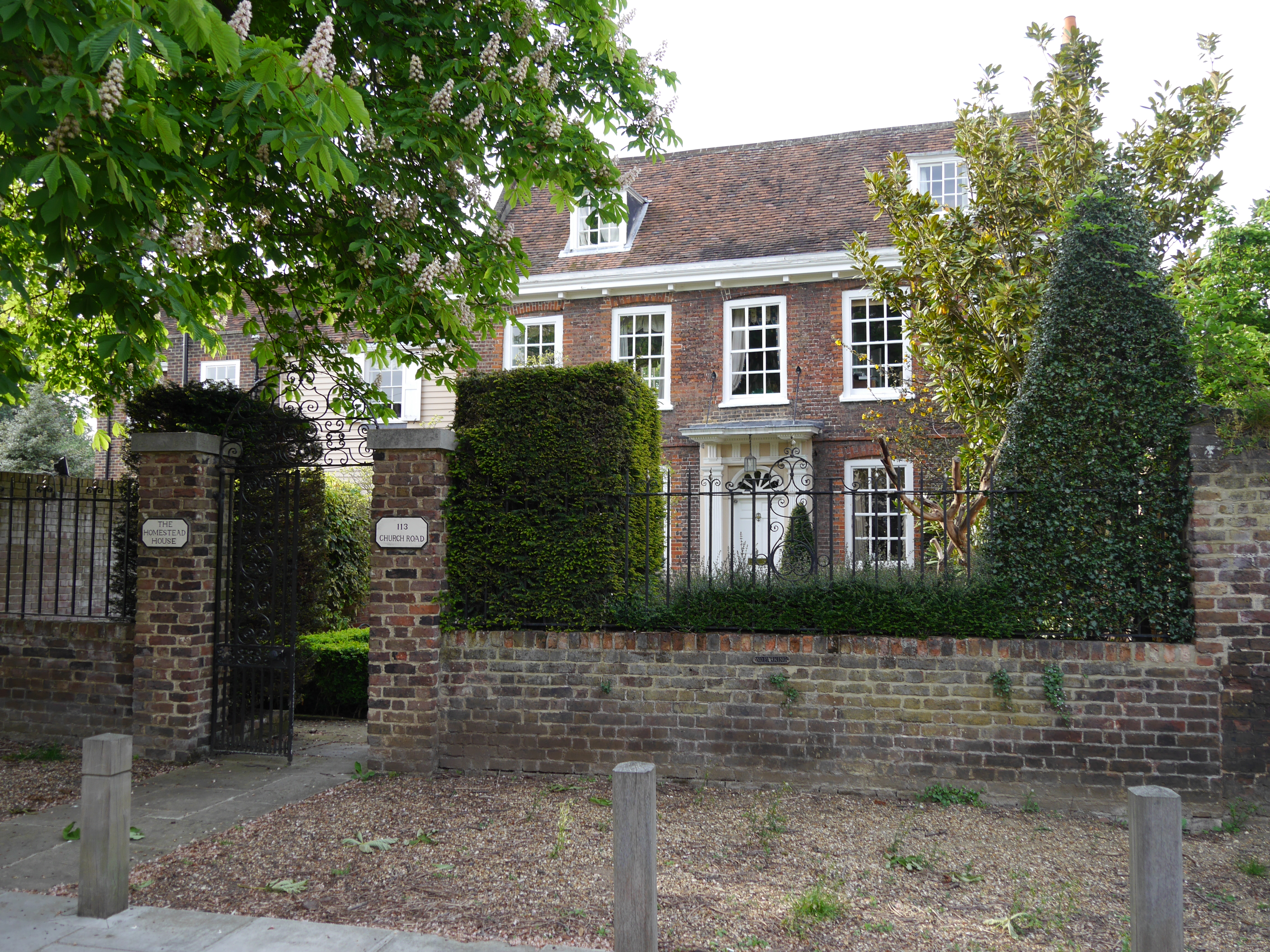
The Homestead, Barnes, 2014

Willis lived and practised at The Homestead, Barnes, in succession to Dr. John Scott, from 1846 till his death.

== Family ==
Willis's son, Robert Watson Willis, served as secretary of the Football Association, and built Hinxton House, East Sheen, in 1877.

== Scholarly work ==
Willis is remembered for his scholarly translation from Latin of the complete works of William Harvey, published by the Sydenham Society in 1847 (Sykes, 2001).

== Confusion with Robert Willis (1800–1875) ==
The acoustic work of another man with the same name, Robert Willis (1800–1875), is often mistakenly attributed to Willis. This is for instance the case in Robert Beyer's Sounds of Our Times: Two Hundred Years of Acoustics (1998). Sometimes, it is the other way round: Thierry Mandoul's Entre raison et utopie: l'Histoire de l'architecture d'Auguste Choisy (2008) erroneously gives the dates 1799–1878 for the Willis who worked in architecture.

== Works by Willis ==
- Robert Willis: Translation of Spurzheim's ‘Anatomy of the Brain', 1826 link
- Robert Willis: Translation of Pierre Rayer's 'Treatise on diseases of the skin', 1835
  - A theoretical and practical treatise on the diseases of the skin 1845 edition
- Robert Willis: Urinary Diseases and their Treatment, 1838 link
- Robert Willis: Illustrations of cutaneous disease, 1839–1841
- Robert Willis: On the Treatment of Stone in the Bladder, 1842
  - (critical) Review by W.C., Dr. Willis on the Treatment of Stone in the Bladder, Provincial Medical Journal and Retrospect of the Medical Sciences, Vol. 4, No. 7 (21 May 1842), pp. 133–136 link
- C. F. H. Marx and Robert Willis: On the decrease of disease effected by the progress of civilization, London, 1844 link
- Robert Willis: Translation of Rudolph Wagner's ‘Elements of Physiology’, 1845 link
- Robert Willis: The Works of William Harvey, M. D, London, 1847 link
- Robert Willis: Translation of Spinoza's Tractatus Theologico-Politicus, 1862 link
- Robert Willis: Benedict de Spinoza; His life, Correspondence, and Ethics, 1870 link
- Robert Willis: Servetus and Calvin, London, 1877 link
- Robert Willis: William Harvey, a history of the discovery of the circulation of the blood, 1878 link

== Other references ==
- Willis, Robert at Dictionary of National Biography
- Roger Cooter: The Cultural Meaning of Popular Science: Phrenology and the Organization of Consent in Nineteenth-Century Britain, 1985 (page 299 has a biographical notice)
- Herman Goodman: Notable contributors to the knowledge of dermatology, 1953
- Victor Cornelius Medvei: A history of endocrinology, 1982
- Proceedings of the Royal Medical & Chirurgical Society of London vol. viii, 1880, p. 390
- The Collected Letters of Thomas and Jane Welsh Carlyle: October 1833 – December 1834, 1973
- W. R. LeFanu: "Robert Willis – physician, librarian, medical historian", Proceedings of the XXIII International Congress of the History of Medicine, London, 2–9 September 1972, Volume 2, 1974, p. 1111
- Alan H. Sykes: Sharpey's fibres: the life of William Sharpey, the father of modern physiology in England, 2001
- Zachary Cope: The Royal College of Surgeons of England: a history, 1959
- Barnes history
- Charles R. Fikar, Oscar L. Corral: "Non-librarian health professionals becoming librarians and information specialists: results of an Internet survey", Bull Med Libr Assoc 2001 January; 89(1): 59–67.
- Robert Paterson: Memorials of the life of James Syme, professor of clinical surgery in the University of Edinburgh, etc., 1874
