= Postage stamps and postal history of the Southern Nigeria Protectorate =

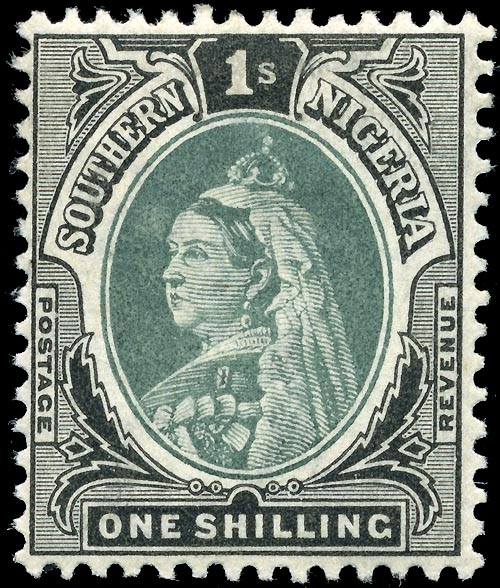
A 1 shilling stamp of the 1901 stamp series

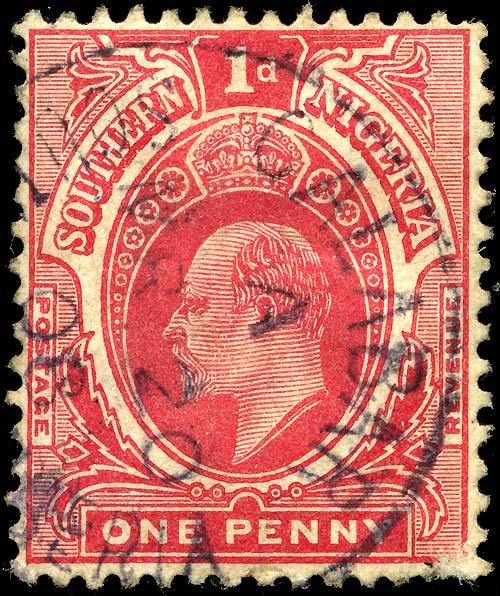
A 1 penny stamp of 1907 used in 1908 at Calabar

This is a survey of the postage stamps and postal history of the Southern Nigeria Protectorate.

The Southern Nigeria Protectorate was a British protectorate in the coastal areas of modern-day Nigeria, formed in 1900 from a union of the Niger Coast Protectorate with territories chartered by the Royal Niger Company below Lokoja on the Niger River. The Lagos Colony was added in 1906, and the territory was officially renamed the Colony and Protectorate of Southern Nigeria. In 1914, Southern Nigeria was joined with Northern Nigeria to form the single colony of Nigeria.

== First stamps ==
The Protectorate initially used the postage stamps of the Coast Protectorate. In March 1901 a set of nine values, depicting Queen Victoria in a 3/4 portrait, went on sale.

== Edward VII ==
The stamps of Queen Victoria were replaced by stamps of Edward VII in 1903. The design, a profile of the King, continued in use throughout his reign, with changes of color, watermark and paper. The 1d. value was redrawn in 1910 and is distinguishable by the "1" in "1d" being thinner, while the "d" is taller and broader.

== George V ==
In 1912, the vignette was replaced with a portrait of George V, for a set of 12, with values ranging from 1/2d. to £1.

== See also ==
- Postage stamps and postal history of the Niger Coast Protectorate
- Postage stamps and postal history of the Niger Territories
- Postage stamps and postal history of Lagos
- Postage stamps and postal history of Nigeria
- Revenue stamps of Southern Nigeria
