= Ralph Moor =

British colonial administrator

Sir Ralph Moor KCMG
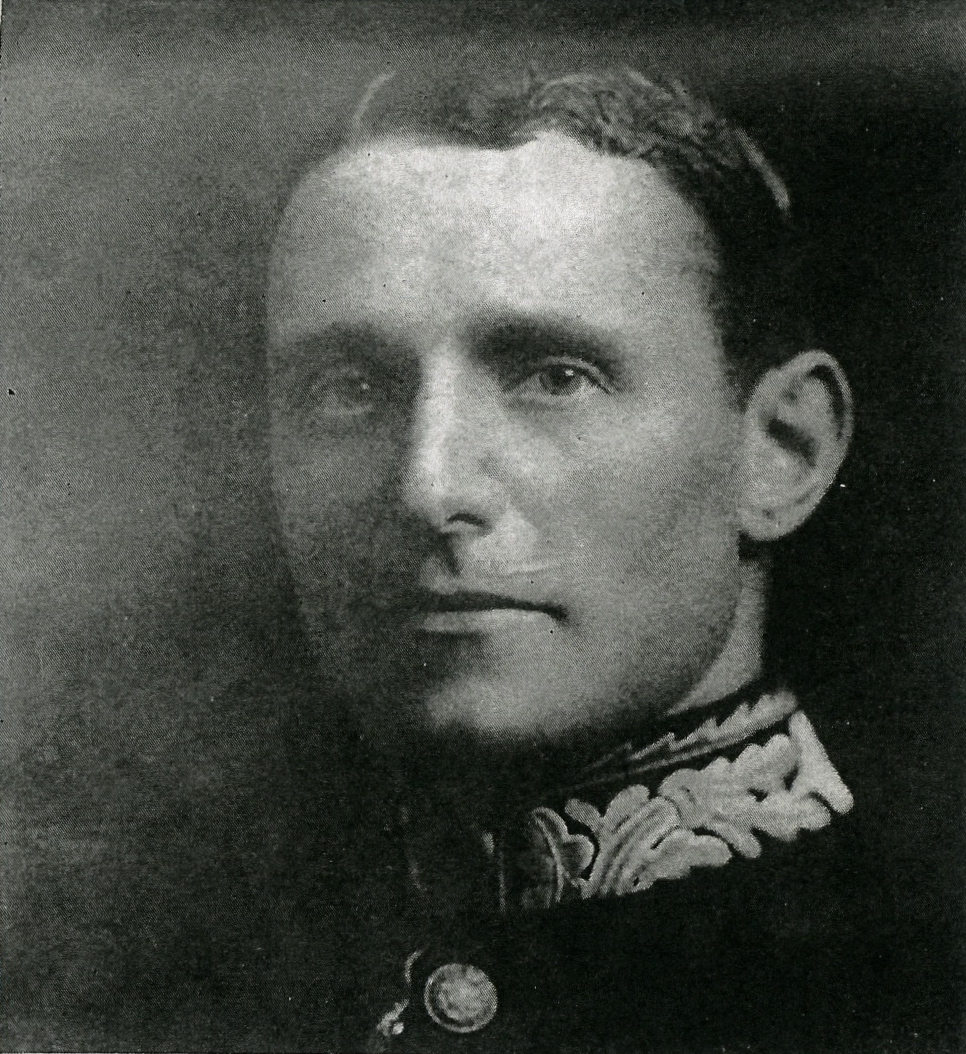

1st High Commissioner of the Southern Nigeria Protectorate
- In office 6 January 1900 – 1 October 1903
- Succeeded by: Walter Egerton

Commissioner and Consul-General of the Niger Coast protectorate
- In office 1 February 1896 – 1 January 1900
- Preceded by: Claude Maxwell MacDonald

Personal details
- Born: 31 July 1860 Furneux Pelham, Buntingford, Hertfordshire, England
- Died: 14 September 1909 (aged 49) Barnes, London, England

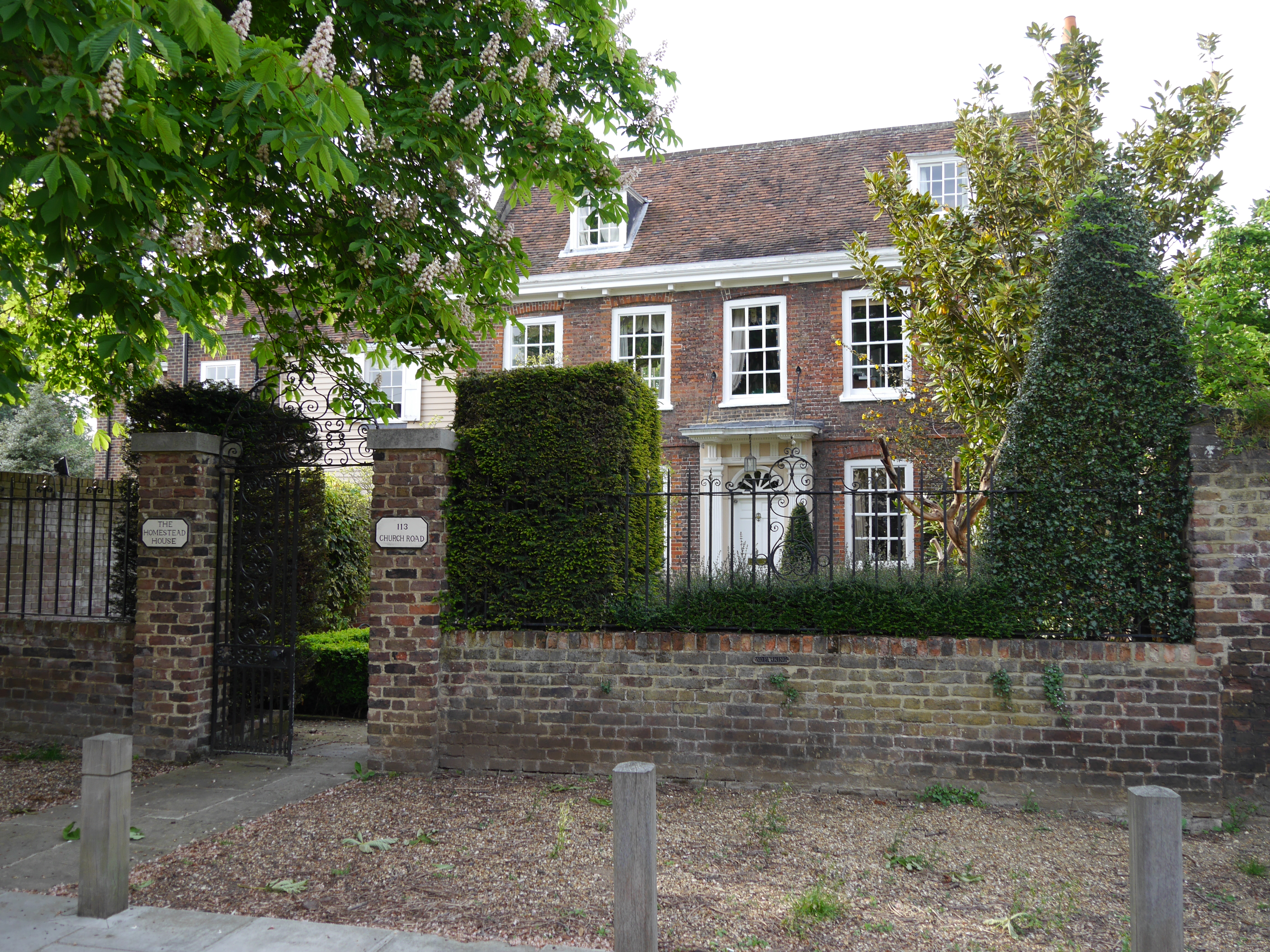
The Homestead, Barnes, 2014

Sir Ralph Denham Rayment Moor, KCMG (31 July 1860 – 14 September 1909) was the first high commissioner of the British Southern Nigeria Protectorate and a key player in the British invasion of the Kingdom of Benin.

== Life ==
Ralph Moor was born on 31 July 1860 at The Lodge, Furneux Pelham, Buntingford, Hertfordshire as son of William Henry Moor (c. 1830 – c. 1863), surgeon, by his wife Sarah Pears. Educated privately, and destined for business, he engaged in 1880–1 as a learner in the tea trade. On 26 October 1882 he entered the Royal Irish Constabulary as a cadet, and becoming in due course a district inspector resigned after involvement in a divorce case on 9 February 1891.

In March 1891 Moor took service under Sir Claude Maxwell MacDonald, the Consul-General of the Oil Rivers Protectorate, as Commandant of Constabulary in the protectorate. In July 1892 he was appointed by the Foreign Office vice-consul for the Oil Rivers district, and from 6 September 1892 to 15 February 1893 acted as commissioner. He also was Acting Consul while McDonald was on leave, during which time he razed Brohemie, during 1894. During January 1896 he served the office of consul, and on 1 February 1896, when the district was formed into the Niger Coast Protectorate, he was made commissioner and consul-general for the territory, and consul for the Cameroons and Fernando Po.

Moor played a key role in the Benin Expedition of 1897, capturing the Oba of Benin, who was then deposed and exiled. Benin City was plundered and more than 2,500 artefacts looted and shipped back to Britain. This included the metal plaques and arefacts collectively known as the Benin Bronzes. One of the most famous pieces, a Queen Idia mask, was kept by Moor, eventually being bought by the British Museum after his death, where it remains today.

When in 1900 the protectorate passed from the Foreign Office to the Colonial Office, Moor became High Commissioner of Southern Nigeria and laid the foundations of the new administration. During his years as high commissioner slave trade was abolished in the protectorate, replaced by a growing labour market and cash currency. The Anglo-Aro War (November 1901 – March 1902) pacified opposition to British rule, and expanded British influence through several new military posts and new British district headquarters at Bende and Owerri. His health failing, he retired on pension on 1 October 1903. He then allied himself with Sir Alfred Lewis Jones; he gave valuable advice on West African affairs, and aided in the development of the British Cotton Growing Association. He also served on certain committees at the nomination of the secretary of state.

Moor was appointed Companion of the Order of St Michael and St George (CMG) in 1895 and Knight Commander (KCMG) in 1897.

He was found dead in bed at his residence, The Homestead, Barnes, on 14 September 1909; having committed suicide by poison. He was buried at the new Barnes cemetery. The coroner's jury determined that "the poison was deliberately taken whilst temporarily insane after suffering acutely from insomnia", they had heard evidence that Moor had suffered for the last four years on his return from Africa with malarial and backwater fever that induced insomnia.

== Family ==
In 1898, he married Adrienne Shapland (born ca. 1871), the widow of J. Burns.

== Notes ==
Government offices
Preceded by first holder	High Commissioner of the Southern Nigeria Protectorate; 1900–1903	Succeeded by Walter Egerton
Preceded by Claude Maxwell MacDonald	Commissioner and Consul-General of the Niger Coast protectorate 1896–1900	Succeeded by last holder
