= Postage stamps and postal history of Lagos =

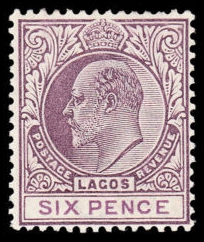
A 1904 six pence stamp of Lagos

This is a survey of the postage stamps and postal history of Lagos, now part of modern Nigeria.

== Stamps ==
The first stamps of Lagos were issued on 10 June 1874. Stamps portraying Queen Victoria were issued until October 1902. In August 1893, an 1887 4d was overprinted "HALF PENNY". On 22 January 1904 a new design portraying King Edward VII was issued. Despite it being used for only two years, the set was issued twice with different watermarks. The last stamp was a 6d issued on 31 October 1905.

== Amalgamation ==
From 16 February 1906, Lagos became part of the Southern Nigeria Protectorate which then itself became part of modern Nigeria in 1914.

== See also ==
- Postage stamps and postal history of Nigeria
- Postage stamps and postal history of the Southern Nigeria Protectorate
- Revenue stamps of Lagos
