= Liverpool and Manchester Trading Company =

The Liverpool and Manchester Trading Company was a 19th-century British company involved in the palm oil trade from Nigeria. Following a years-long price war, it sold its interests in the region to the United African Company in 1884.
