= Agnes Syme Lister =

British botanist (1834–1893)

Lady Lister
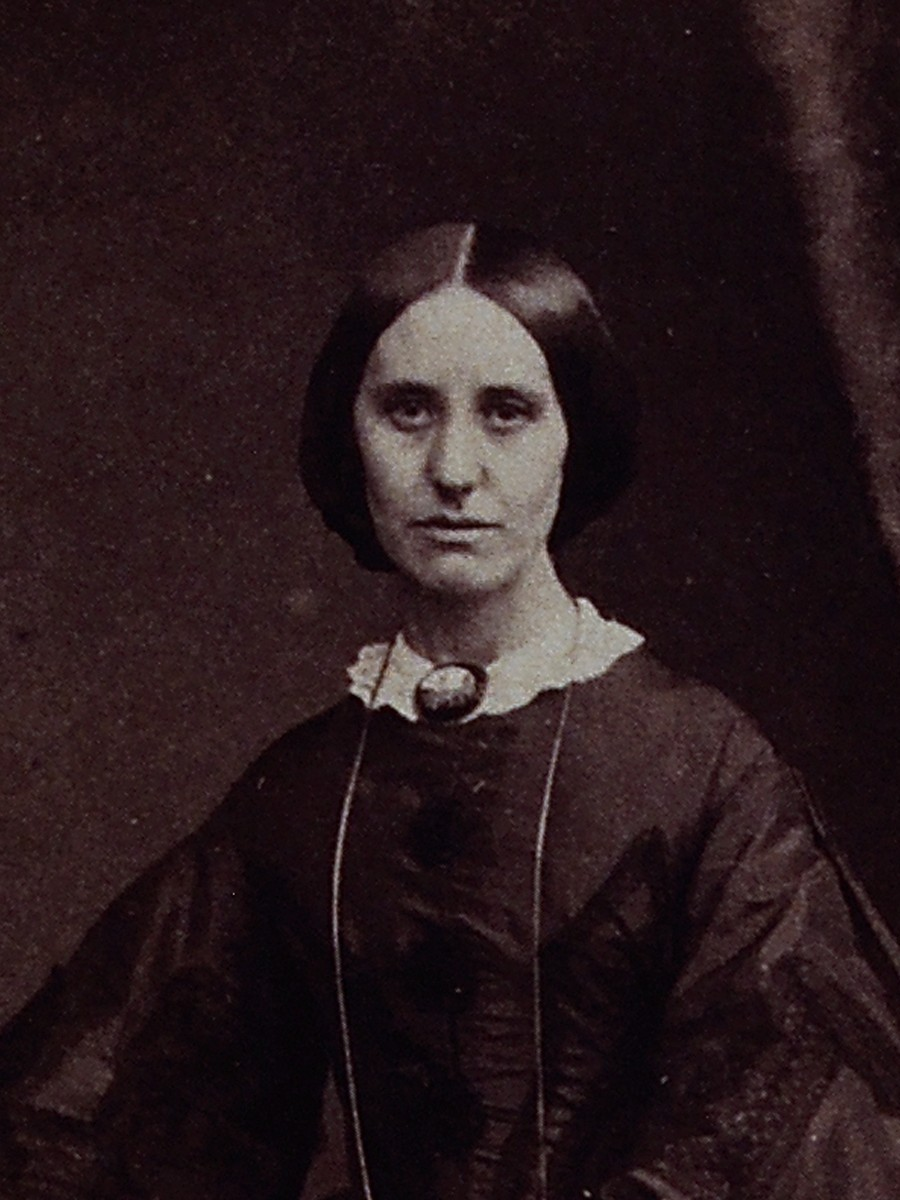
- Lister, c. 1862
- Born: Agnes Syme; 23 November 1834; Edinburgh, Scotland
- Died: 12 April 1893 (aged 58); Rapallo, Italy
- Occupations: Botanist; scientific assistant
- Spouse: Joseph Lister (m. 1856)
- Father: James Syme
- Relatives: Robert Willis (uncle)

Agnes Syme, Lady Lister (23 November 1834 – 12 April 1893), was a British botanist. She was the wife of and assistant to her husband, Joseph Lister. A botanical collector in her own right, she collaborated with her husband on many of his experiments, including the dosage of chloroform.

== Early life ==
Agnes Syme was born in Edinburgh, Midlothian, Scotland in 1834 to James Syme and his first wife Anne. Anne was the daughter of Robert Willis, of Leith, Edinburgh, and sister of the physician Robert Willis. She was one of only three surviving children. Her mother died in 1840 after giving birth to their ninth child. Like her father, Agnes had an independent mind and had an interest in science.

== Career ==
Agnes Syme met Joseph Lister in Glasgow, whilst he was studying to be a surgeon and working as her father's assistant. Lister converted to the Scottish Episcopal Church in order to marry Agnes as she was not raised as a Quaker. They married on 23 April 1856 in Milbank Scotland. The couple began their honeymoon at Lister's childhood home in Upton, Essex and they then embarked on a three month tour of Europe. During this tour, it is thought that Agnes began to work as his assistant, writing his notes and findings in his case book whilst they travelled around Europe. The couple returned to Edinburgh in October 1856 and settled into their new home at 11 Rutland Street.

Lister's career was a close collaboration with her husband and their achievements are inextricably linked. During their time travelling across Austria-Hungary the couple collected 53 herbarium plants. From 1863 to 1894 they wrote common place books together, the majority being in her handwriting. These books were on topics such as: Bacteria; Catgut; antiseptic dressings.

Furthermore, Lister was also involved in many of Joseph Lister's experiments. They would both test different levels of chloroform (an early form of anaesthesia) on each other in order to find the correct dosage for his patients. The couple were also interested in botany and would often collect different specimens of plants whilst travelling around Europe together. Botany was one of the few sciences deemed appropriate for women to study/partake in, in the 18th century. Fifty-three herbarium sheets belonging to Joseph Lister are recorded in both their handwriting.

The Scottish surgeon Watson Cheyne, who was almost a surrogate son to Joseph Lister, stated after his death that Agnes Lister had entered into her husband's work wholeheartedly, had been his only secretary, and that they discussed his work on an almost equal footing. Her husband's books are full of Lister's careful handwriting. She would take dictation from her husband, taken at hours at a stretch. Spaces would be left blank amongst the reams of her handwriting for small diagrams, that her husband would create using the camera lucida technique and Lister would later paste in.

Although in good health, whilst holidaying in Rapallo in Italy and collecting botanical specimens, Lister contracted acute pneumonia. Her condition deteriorated rapidly and she died four days later, after being on holiday for only one week. This left Baron Lister as the only surviving member of their union, as they did not have any children.

== Legacy ==
There are two plant specimens dated for 10 September 1883 in the Science Museum Collection.

== Gallery ==
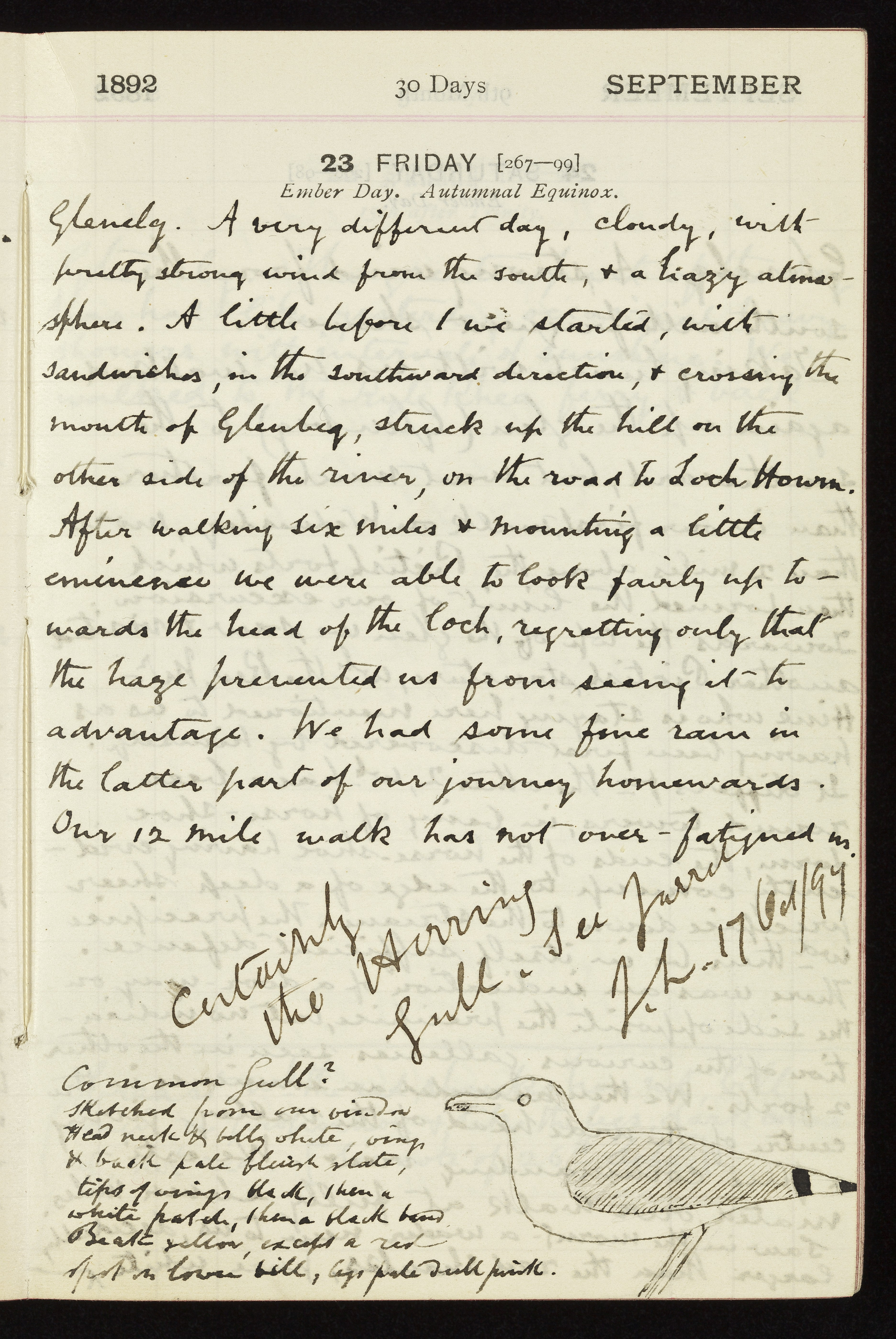
Page of Lister's holiday diary

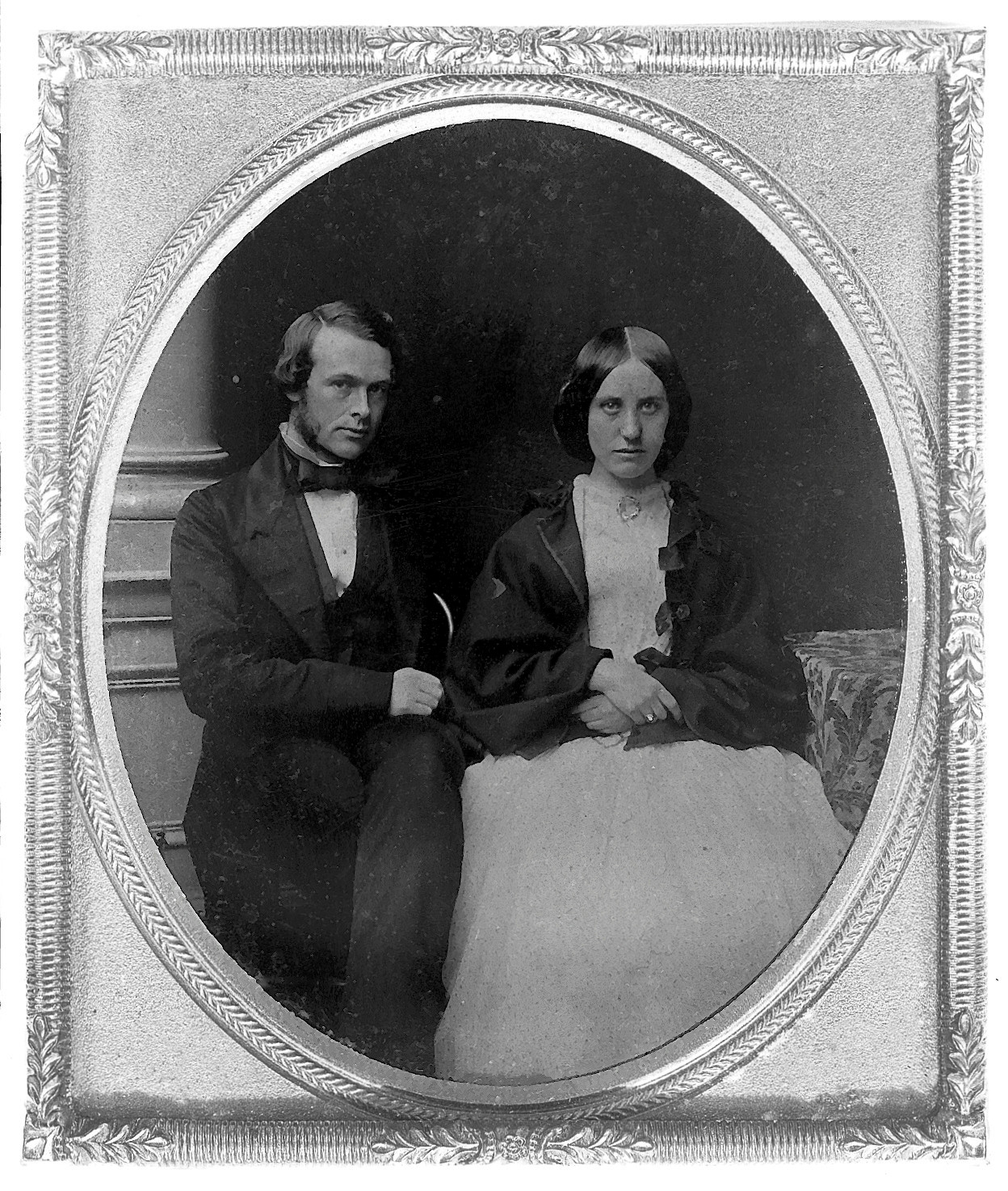
The Listers
