= James Syme =

Scottish surgeon (1799–1870)

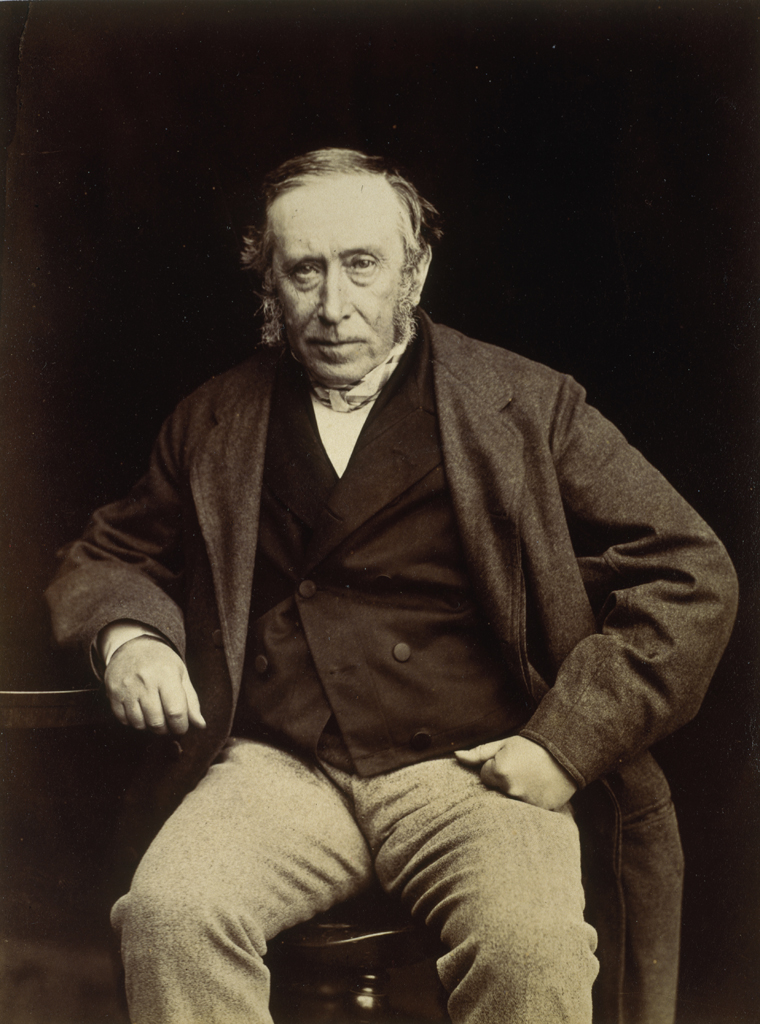
- James Syme, c. 1855
- Born: 7 November 1799; Edinburgh, Scotland
- Died: 26 June 1870 (aged 70); Millbank House, Kingsknowe, Edinburgh, Scotland
- Occupation: Surgeon

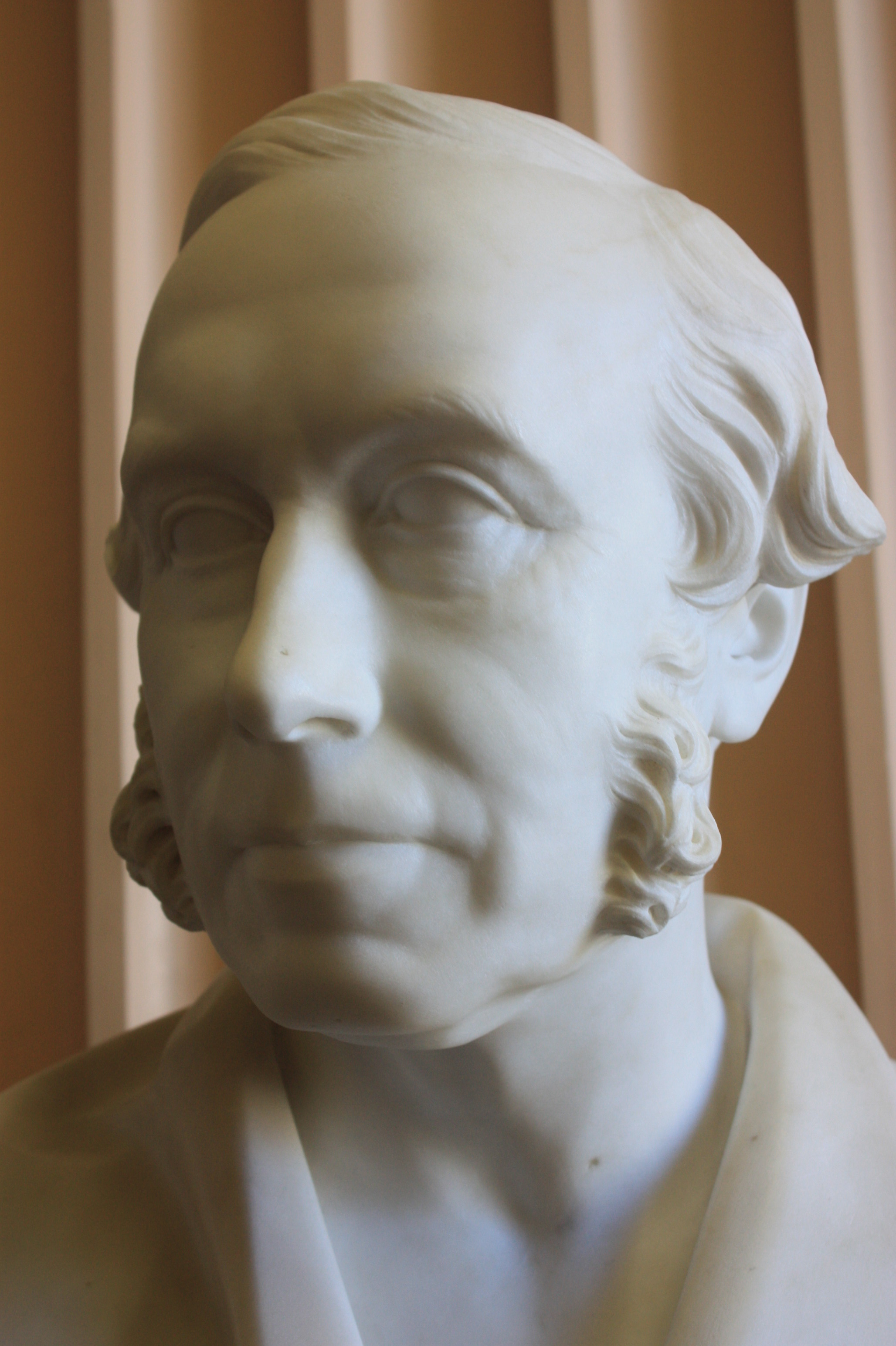
Bust of Prof James Syme, by William Brodie, 1872, Old College, University of Edinburgh

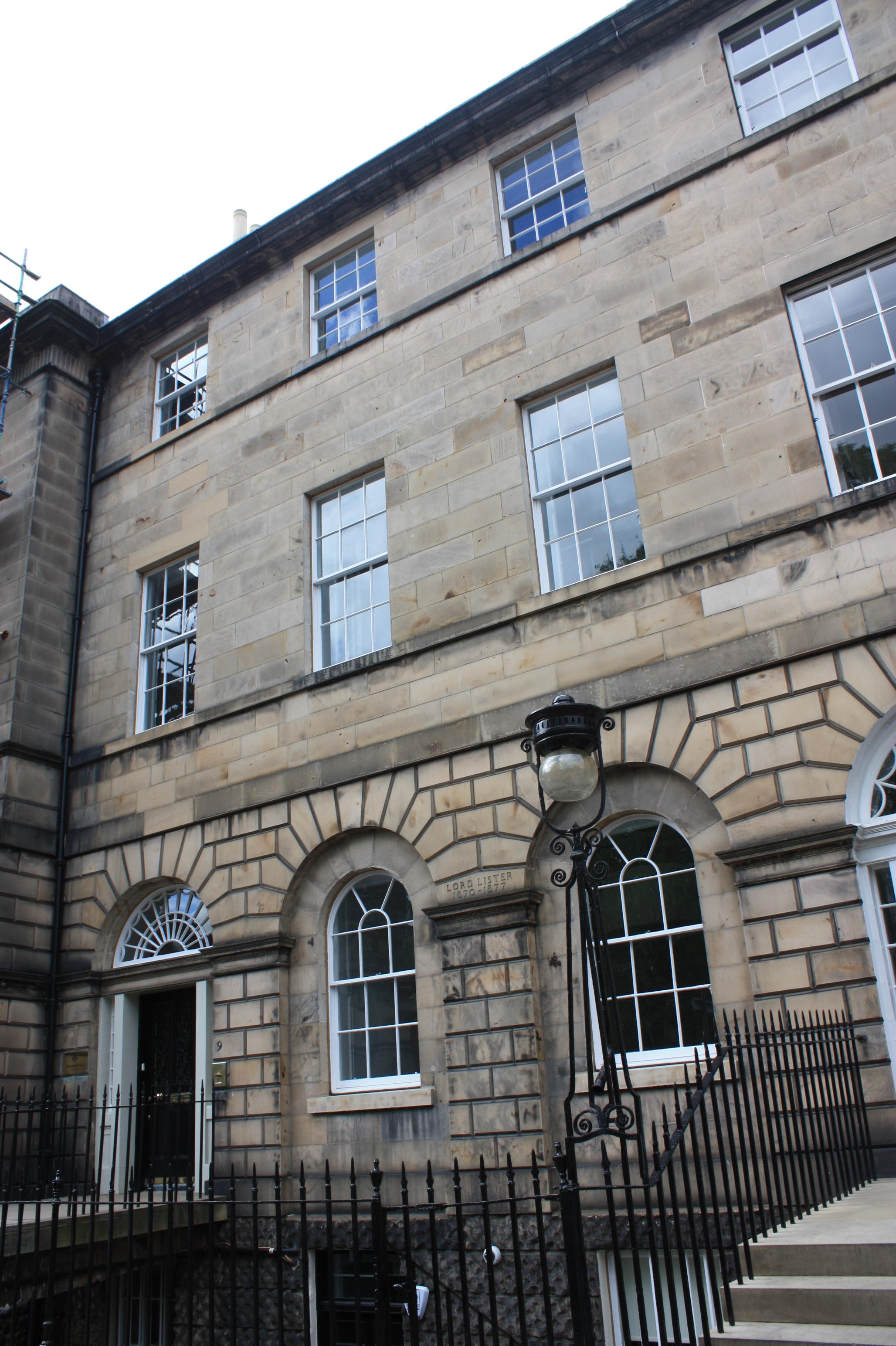
Syme's home at 9 Charlotte Square, Edinburgh

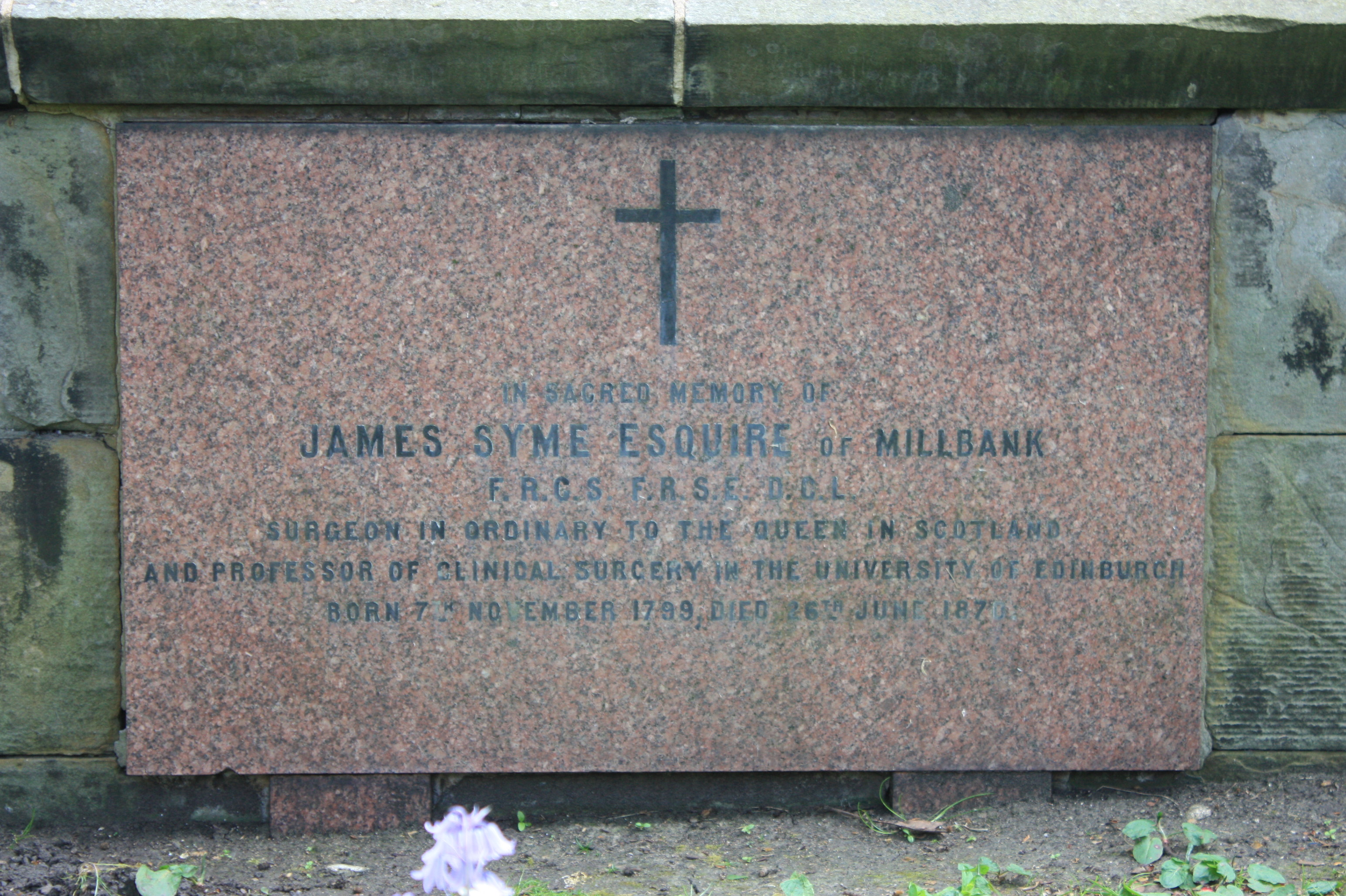
The grave of James Syme, St John's Episcopal Churchyard, Edinburgh

James Syme FRCSE, FRCS, FRSE (7 November 1799 – 26 June 1870) was a Scottish pioneering surgeon.

== Early life ==
James Syme was born on 7 November 1799 at 56 Princes Street in Edinburgh. His father was John Syme WS of Cartmore and Lochore, estates in Fife and Kinross. His father lost most of his fortune in attempting to develop the mineral resources of his property. His father had a legal practice at 23 North Hanover Street, not far from Princes Street in Edinburgh.

James was educated at the Royal High School at the age of nine, and remained until he was fifteen, when he entered the University of Edinburgh. For two years he frequented the arts classes (including botany), and in 1817 began the medical curriculum, devoting himself with particular keenness to chemistry. His chemical experiments led him to the discovery that a valuable substance is obtainable from coal tar which has the property of dissolving india-rubber, and could be used for waterproofing silk and other textile fabrics; an idea which was patented a few months afterwards by Charles Macintosh, of Glasgow, who invented the Mackintosh raincoat.

== In the dissecting room ==
In the session 1818–1819 Syme became assistant and demonstrator of the dissecting room of Robert Liston, who had started as an extramural teacher of anatomy in competition with Liston's old master, John Barclay; in those years he held also resident appointments in the infirmary and the fever hospital, and spent some time in Paris practising dissection and operative surgery. In 1823 Liston handed over to him the whole charge of his anatomy classes, retaining his interest in the school as a pecuniary venture; the arrangement did not work smoothly, and a feud with Liston arose, which did not terminate until twenty years later, when Liston was settled in London.

== Clinical teaching ==
In 1824–25, he founded the Brown Square School of Medicine, but again disagreed with his partners in the venture. Announcing his intention to practise surgery only after being unable to fill a vacancy at Edinburgh Royal Infirmary, Syme started a surgical hospital of his own, Minto House hospital.

He worked there from May 1829 to September 1833, with great success as a surgical charity and school of clinical instruction. It was here that he first put into practice his method of clinical teaching, which consisted in having the patients to be operated or prelected upon brought from the ward into a lecture-room or theatre where the students were seated conveniently for seeing and taking notes.

His private practice had become very considerable, his position having been assured ever since his amputation at the hip joint in 1823, the first operation of the kind in Scotland. In 1833 he succeeded James Russell as professor of clinical surgery in Edinburgh University. Syme's accession to the clinical chair was marked by two important changes in the conditions of it: the first was that the professor should have the care of surgical patients in the infirmary in right of his professorship, and the second, that attendance on his course should be obligatory on all candidates for the medical degree. When Liston removed to London in 1835 Syme became the leading consulting surgeon in Scotland. In 1837 he was elected a member of the Harveian Society of Edinburgh.

== University College, London ==
In 1847, Syme was accepted the chair of clinical surgery at University College, London left vacant after Liston's death. He began practice in London in February 1848; but early in May the same year difficulties with two of his colleagues at Gower Street and a desire to escape from animosity and contention led him to give up his appointment. He returned to Edinburgh in July, and was reinstated in his old chair, to which the crown authority had meanwhile found a difficulty in appointing. The judgment of his friends was that he was always right in the matter, but often wrong in the manner, of his quarrels. In 1849 he was elected a member of the Aesculapian Club. He was elected President of the Royal College of Surgeons of Edinburgh in 1849.

== Medical reform ==
In 1849, he broached the subject of medical reform in a letter to the lord advocate; in 1854 and 1857 he addressed open letters on the same subject to Lord Palmerston; and in 1858 a Medical Act was passed which largely followed the lines laid down by himself. As a member of the general medical council called into existence by the act, he made considerable stir in 1868 by an uncompromising statement of doctrines on medical education, which were thought by many to be reactionary; they were, however, merely an attempt to recommend the methods that had been characteristic of Edinburgh teaching since William Cullen's time—namely, a constant reference of facts to principles, the subordination (but not the sacrifice) of technical details to generalities, and the preference of large professional classes and the magnetism of numbers to the tutorial system, which he identified with cramming.

In the 1860s he acted as a surgeon at Leith Hospital.

== Death ==
In April 1869, he had a paralytic seizure, and at once resigned his chair; he never recovered his powers, and died near Edinburgh in June 1870. He was a Christian whose religious feeling increased as he grew older.

Syme is buried on the upper north-east terrace of St John's Episcopal Churchyard at the east end of Princes Street, Edinburgh.

Syme's character is not inaptly summed up in the dedication to him by his old pupil, John Brown, of the series of essays Locke and Sydenham: Verax, capax, perspicax, sagax, efficax, tenax.

== Family ==
Syme married twice. Firstly he married Anne Willis, the sister of his former colleague, Robert Willis. She died in 1840, while giving birth to their ninth child. Only two of their nine children, daughters Agnes and Lucy, survived into adulthood.

In December 1841, Syme married Jemima Burn. The couple had five children, three of whom survived into adulthood.

In 1856, Syme's daughter Agnes married Joseph Lister, who in 1854 had been appointed first assistant surgeon to Syme at the University of Edinburgh. Having grown up as the eldest surviving child of a surgeon, Agnes Syme Lister often assisted her husband's medical research, including taking dictation and case notes. They maintained a home laboratory, where Joseph Lister conducted experiments that would lead to the development of antiseptic sprays for surgical theatres.

== Bibliography ==
Syme's surgical writings were numerous, although the terseness of his style and directness of his method saved them from being bulky:

- A Treatise on the Excision of Diseased Joints (1831)—the celebrated ankle-joint amputation is known by his name
- Principles of Surgery (1831 often reprinted)
- Diseases of the Rectum (1838);
- Contributions to the Pathology and Practice of Surgery (1848)—a collection of thirty-one original memoirs published in periodicals from time to time
- Stricture of the Urethra and Fistula in Pei-ineo (1849)
- Observations in Clinical Surgery (1861)
- Excision of the Scapula (1864)
- On Lycanphropy 1871
