= Postage stamps and postal history of Biafra =

A 1968 stamp of Biafra

A map of Biafra at the time of secession

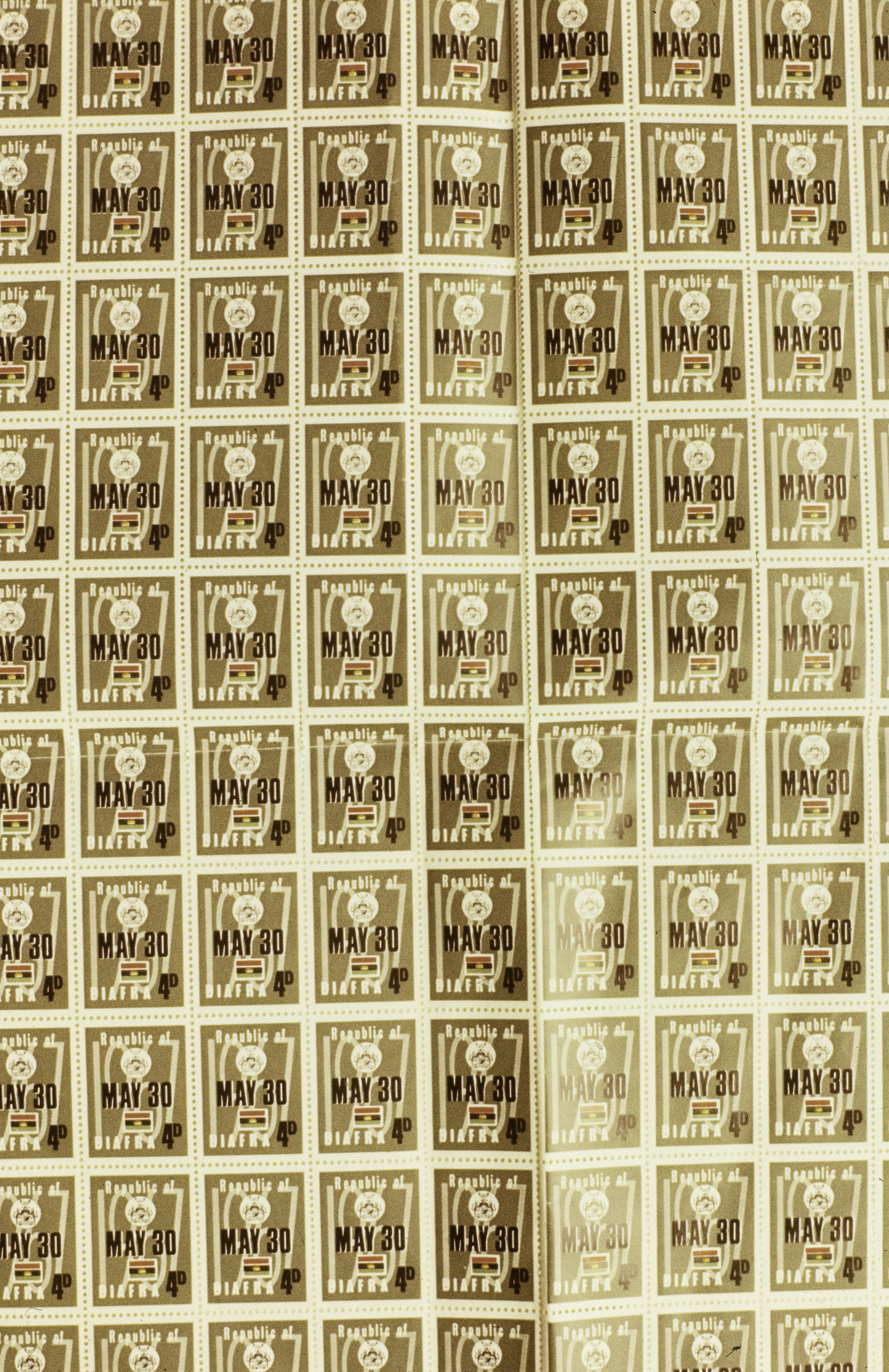
Stamps "Republic of Biafra. May 30. 4D".

This is a survey of the postage stamps and postal history of Biafra.

The Republic of Biafra was a secessionist state in south-eastern Nigeria which existed from 30 May 1967 to 15 January 1970. The secession was led by the Igbo people following economic, ethnic, cultural and religious tensions among the various peoples of Nigeria and contributed to the causes for the Nigerian Civil War, also known as the Nigerian-Biafran War. Biafra was recognized by Gabon, Haiti, Côte d'Ivoire, Tanzania and Zambia.

The authorities in Biafra issued banknotes and postage stamps in order to assert their claim to sovereignty. The postage stamps were used mainly on internal mail within the region but also on some external mail sent by air via Libreville in Gabon. The stamps are not recognised as legitimate by all stamp catalogues.

== First stamps ==
After independence, the Post Office in Biafra continued to use Nigerian stamps until they ran out when a "postage paid" cachet was applied instead until the first stamps were issued.

The first stamps of Biafra were issued on 5 February 1968 and consisted of three values to mark Biafran "independence".

== Overprints ==
On 1 April 1968 thirteen stamps of Nigeria from the 1965 issue were issued overprinted with the Biafran coat of arms and the words SOVEREIGN BIAFRA. The 1/2d and 1d values from the same 1965 Nigeria series also exist surcharged with new values and overprinted BIAFRA-FRANCE FRIENDSHIP 1968 SOVEREIGN BIAFRA but these stamps are not believed to have been used for postage.

== Later issues ==
A number of further stamps were issued in 1968 and 1969 inscribed BIAFRA or REPUBLIC OF BIAFRA, including miniature sheets, further overprints and stamps ostensibly issued to raise funds for charity.

== See also ==
- WikiBooks
- Biafran pound
- Postage stamps and postal history of Nigeria
- West Africa Study Circle
