= Postage stamps and postal history of the Niger Territories =

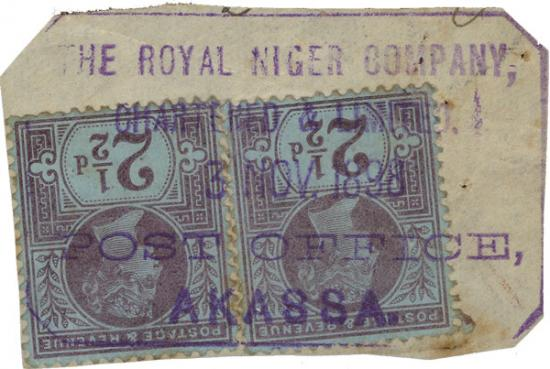
British Victorian stamps used at Akassa in the Niger Territories and bearing the cancel of the Royal Niger Company

This is a survey of the postage stamps and postal history of the Niger Territories, an area between the Forcados and Brasse Rivers, once administered by the Royal Niger Company but now part of modern Nigeria.

== First stamps ==
The first stamps used in the Niger Territories were British stamps from 1890. The Niger Territories never issued stamps, they only used British stamps which can be identified by their distinctive postmarks. The postmarks were inscribed "THE NIGER TERRITORIES POST OFFICE" or "THE ROYAL NIGER COMPANY CHARTERED & LIMITED", and with the name of the post office underneath. The post offices were:

- Abutshi (4 October to 31 December 1899)
- Akassa (1888 to December 1899)
- Asaba (inscr. Agent General Niger Territories) (1894 to 4 August 1895)
- Burutu (20 January 1897 to 20 May 1899)
- Lokoja (30 June to 31 December 1899)

== Transfer ==
From 1 January 1900, the territories were transferred to the control of the British government to form the Southern Nigeria Protectorate.

== See also ==
- Postage stamps and postal history of Nigeria
- Postage stamps and postal history of the Southern Nigeria Protectorate
