= Postage stamps and postal history of the Northern Nigeria Protectorate =

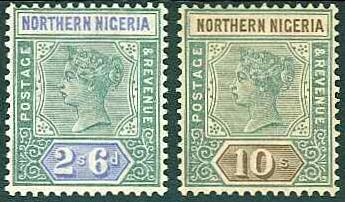
Two Victorian stamps of the Northern Nigeria Protectorate

This is a survey of the postage stamps and postal history of the Northern Nigeria Protectorate.

== First stamps ==
Postage stamps were issued specifically for the Northern Nigeria Protectorate beginning in 1900. All stamps of the Northern Nigeria Protectorate are definitive issues of a Key Plate design, differing in the sovereign depicted, type of paper, watermarks, and choice of colored or colorless numerals for the denomination.

The first series consisted of nine stamps with values ranging from 1/2 pence to 10 shillings, depicting Queen Victoria. The second series, consisting of identical denominations, but in slightly different colors was issued on July 1, 1902, depicting King Edward VII. Unusually, a £25 stamp was issued in April 1904. This was really intended as a revenue stamp, it being nearly impossible to invent a piece of mail needing so much postage. It was used to pay for imported liquor licences. It is the great rarity of philately with copies commanding a high price. The King Edward series was reissued in 1905 in eight denominations, and again in 1910–11 in eleven denominations.

The final series of stamps for the Northern Nigeria Protectorate was a series of thirteen denominations depicting King George V.

Stamps of Northern Nigeria were replaced by those of the Colony and Protectorate of Nigeria in 1914.

== Borgu local post ==
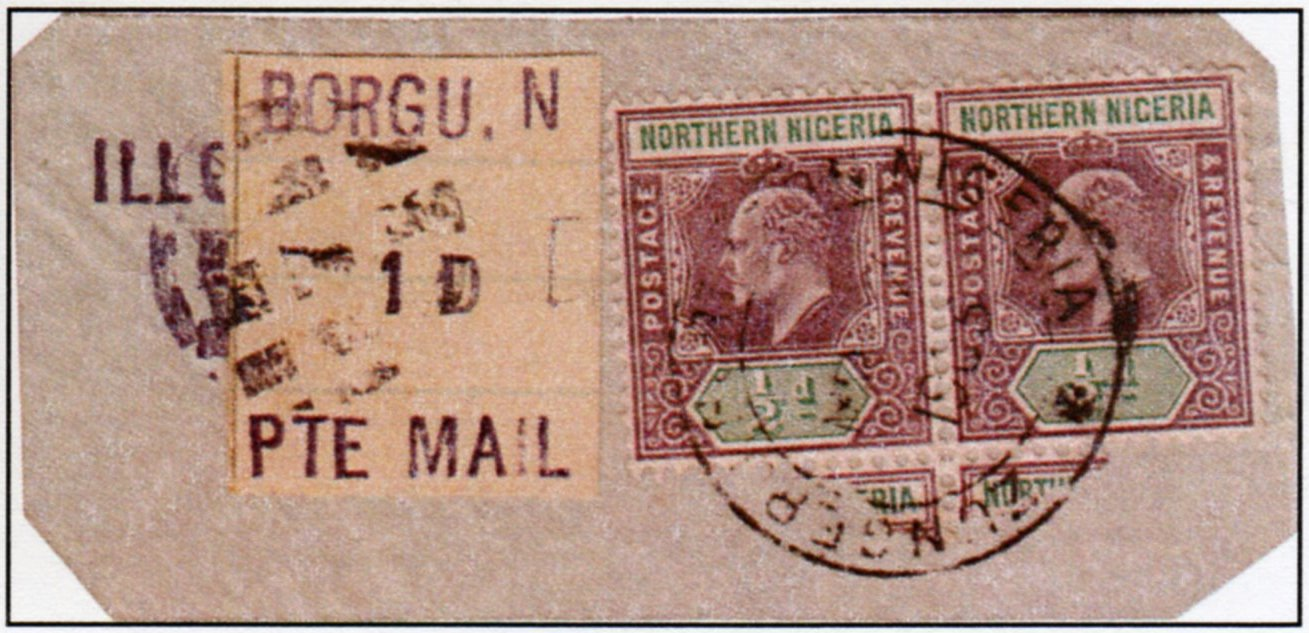
1905 Borgu 1d local stamp with stamps of Northern Nigeria used on piece via Zungeru

A local post briefly existed at Borgu in 1905 for which crudely made one penny stamps were produced.

== See also ==
- Postage stamps and postal history of the Southern Nigeria Protectorate
- Postage stamps and postal history of Nigeria
- Revenue stamps of Northern Nigeria
