= Compagnie du Sénégal et de la Côte occidentale d'Afrique =

The Compagnie du Sénégal (SCOA) (French for "the Senegal Company" or "Company of the Senegal"), officially the Compagnie du Sénégal et de la Côte occidentale d'Afrique ("Company of the Senegal and of the West Coast of Africa") was a 19th-century colonial French company involved in the palm oil trade in Nigeria.

The company was founded at Marseille by a M. Verminck. Along with the French Equatorial African Association, the Senegal Company received subsidies from the Léon Gambetta administration and was intended to establish French claims on the lower Niger. Two years after it was founded, the company became a joint stock company, with Verminck as manager.

At its height, it operated 14 trading posts on the Niger and Benue rivers. The company also has two agencies in Manchester and Liverpool, which make purchases of goods from the leading textile industrial power, then exchanged on the west coast of Africa, where it has nine agencies, eighteen sub-counters, 80 European and 300 African employees.

Following a years-long price war and Gambetta's death in 1882, the company sold its interests in the region to the British United African Company in October 1884.

== See also ==
- Compagnie du Sénégal, the unrelated chartered company which administered French Senegal in the 17th century
