= Compagnie du Sénégal =

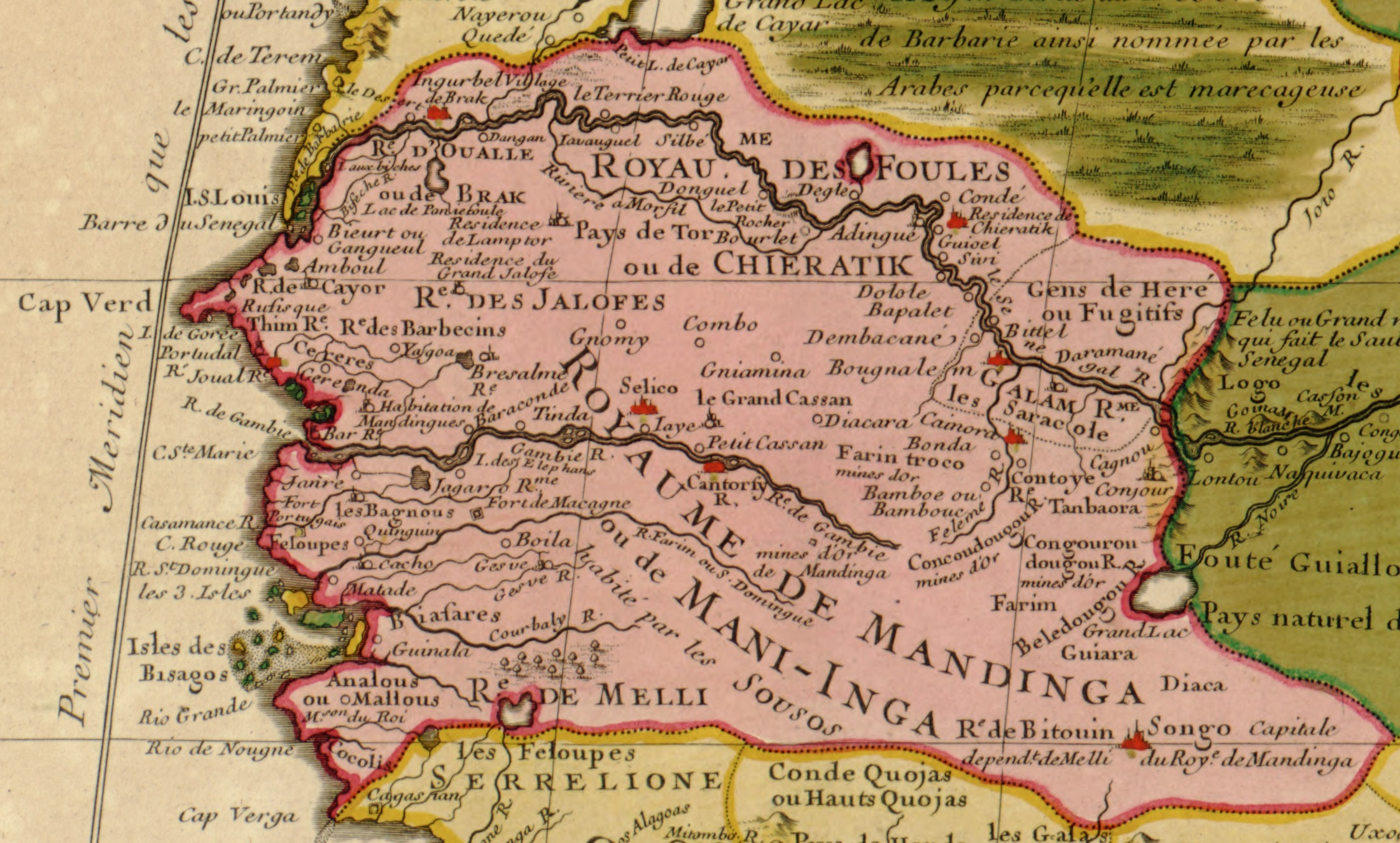
Senegal, from the 1707 map of "Barbaria, Nigritia, and Guinea" by Guillaume de l'Isle.

The Compagnie du Sénégal (French for the "Senegal Company" or, more literally, the "Company of the Senegal") was a 17th-century French chartered company that administered the territories of Saint-Louis and Gorée island as part of French Senegal.

== First company ==
The company succeeded to some of the territories of the French West India Company in 1672, just prior to its bankruptcy and the revocation of its charter in 1674. Sieur de Richemont served as governor of its territories from 1672 to 1673 and was succeeded by the company's director Jacques Fuméchon, who served until 1682. The company's operations were then taken over by the Compagnie royale d'Afrique and Compagnie de Guinée.

== Second company ==
In 1696, the Compagnie royale du Sénégal was established and operated by Jean Bourguignon from March 1696 to April 1697 and then by André Brue until May 1702. They traded slaves with the Hausa Kingdoms, Mali, and the Moors in Mauritania.

== Third company ==
In 1709, a third Compagnie du Sénégal was established.

== See also ==
- Compagnie du Sénégal et de la Côte occidentale d'Afrique
- Banque du Sénégal
- List of colonial governors of Senegal
- List of French colonial trading companies
- List of chartered companies
