= Niger Coast Protectorate =

1891–1900 UK possession in Western Africa

Oil Rivers Protectorate (1884–1893) Niger Coast Protectorate (1893–1900)
- 1884–1900
- Flag Coat of arms
- Anthem: God Save the Queen
- Status: Protectorate of the United Kingdom
- Capital: Old Calabar
- Common languages: English, Igbo, Ibibio-Efik, Edo, Ijaw and others
- Religion: Christianity, Igbo religion, Edo religion
- Monarch
  - 1884—1900: Victoria
- Consul General
  - 1884–1891: Edward Hyde Hewett
  - 1891–1896: Claude Maxwell MacDonald
  - 1896–1900: Ralph Moor
- Historical era: New Imperialism
  - Established: 1884
  - Disestablished: 1 January 1900
- Currency: Pound sterling
Preceded by
Aro Confederacy
Kingdom of Benin
Akpakip Oro
Akwa Akpa
Kingdom of Bonny
Succeeded by
Southern Nigeria Protectorate

The Niger Coast Protectorate was a British protectorate in the Oil Rivers area of present-day Nigeria, originally established as the Oil Rivers Protectorate in 1884 and confirmed at the Berlin Conference the following year. It was renamed on 12 May 1893, and merged with the chartered territories of the Royal Niger Company on 1 January 1900 to form the Southern Nigeria Protectorate.

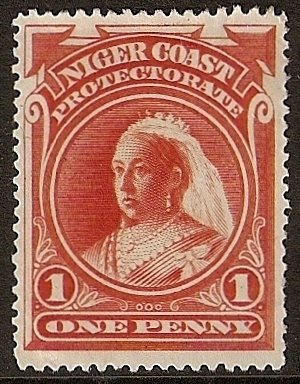
Queen Victoria on a stamp of the Niger Coast Protectorate, 1894

The protectorate covered the eastern coast of what is today Nigeria, and in theory extended inland as far as Lokoja. It was established to better regulate and control the large trade in palm oil that was coming through both Calabar and the Niger Delta, and which had given the various rivers in the area the name of oil rivers.
