= Okoya =

Nigerian given name

- Gender: Male
- Language: Yoruba

Origin
- Origin: Yorubaland
- Meaning: The hoe broke..
- Region of origin: Yorubaland [Nigeria, Benin, Togo]

Okoya audio is a male given name and surname of Yoruba origin. It means "The hoe broke.

== Notable individuals with the names ==
- Olajumoke Okoya-Thomas (born 1957), Nigerian politician
- Molade Okoya-Thomas (1935–2015), Nigerian businessman
- Razaq Okoya (born 1940), Nigerian businessman
- Samuel Segun Okoya (born 1958), Professor of Mathematics
