= Colonial Nigeria =

British colony and protectorate (1914–1960)

Colony and Protectorate of Nigeria (1914–1954) Federation of Nigeria (1954–1960)
- 1914–1960
- Flag (1952–1960) Badge (1952–1960)
- Anthem: God Save the King/Queen
- Nigeria (red); British possessions in Africa (pink) as of 1914
- Status: British colony
- Capital: Lagos
- Common languages: Yoruba · Hausa · Igbo · English and other regional languages
- Religion: Christianity · Islam · Traditional beliefs
- Government: Colony and protectorate (1914–1954) Federation (1954–1960)
- British monarch
  - 1914–1936: George V
  - 1936: Edward VIII
  - 1936–1952: George VI
  - 1952–1960: Elizabeth II
- Governor
  - 1914–1919: Sir Frederick Lugard
  - 1919–1925: Sir Hugh Clifford
  - 1948–1954: Sir John Stuart Macpherson
  - 1954–1960: Sir James Wilson Robertson
- Legislature: Legislative Council (1946–1951) House of Representatives (1951–1960)
- Historical era: World War I • Interwar period • World War II • Cold War
  - Established: 1 January 1914
  - Autonomous federation: 1 October 1954
  - Independence: 1 October 1960

Area
- 1924: 872,050 km^{2} (336,700 sq mi)
- 1952: 876,953 km^{2} (338,593 sq mi)

Population
  - 1924: 18,500,000
  - 1952: 31,156,027
- Currency: British West African pound (1914–1958) Nigerian pound (1958–1960)
- Time zone: UTC+1 (WAT)
Preceded by	Succeeded by
Northern Nigeria Protectorate; Southern Nigeria Protectorate	Federation of Nigeria
- Today part of: Nigeria; Cameroon^{a}
- ^a Bakassi peninsula; governed by Nigeria until 2008

Colonial Nigeria formed part of the British Empire from the mid-nineteenth century until 1 October 1960, when Nigeria achieved independence. Britain annexed Lagos in 1861 and established the Oil River Protectorate in 1884. British influence in the Niger area increased gradually in the course of the 19th century, but Britain did not effectively occupy the area until 1885. Other European powers acknowledged Britain's dominance over the area at the 1885 Berlin Conference.

From 1886 to 1899, much of the area was ruled by the Royal Niger Company, authorised by charter, and governed by George Taubman Goldie. In 1900, the Southern Nigeria Protectorate and Northern Nigeria Protectorate passed from company hands to the Crown. At the urging of Governor Frederick Lugard, the two territories were amalgamated as the Colony and Protectorate of Nigeria, while each of the three major regions (Northern protectorate, Southern protectorate and the Colony of Lagos) retained considerable regional autonomy. Progressive constitutions after World War II provided for increasing representation and electoral government by Nigerians. The colonial-period proper in Nigeria lasted from 1900 to 1960, after which Nigeria gained its independence.

== Overview ==
Through a progressive sequence of regimes, the British imposed Crown Colony and protectorate government on parts of West Africa which came to be known as Nigeria, a form of rule which was both autocratic and bureaucratic. After initially adopting an indirect rule approach, in 1906 the British merged the small Lagos Colony and the Southern Nigeria Protectorate into a new Southern Nigeria Protectorate, and in 1914 that was combined with the Northern Nigeria Protectorate to form the Colony and Protectorate of Nigeria. Administration and military control of the territory was conducted primarily by white Britons, both in London and in Nigeria.

Following military conquest, the British imposed an economic system designed to profit from African labour. The essential basis of this system was a money economy—specifically the British pound sterling—which could be demanded through taxation, paid to cooperative natives, and levied as a fine.

The amalgamation of different ethnic and religious groups into one federation created internal tension which persists in Nigeria to the present day.

== Origins of British influence ==
In the 1700s, the British Empire and other European powers had settlements and forts in West Africa but had not yet established the full-scale plantation colonies which existed in the Americas. Adam Smith wrote in 1776 that the African societies were "better established and more populous than those of the Americas, thus creating a more formidable barrier to European expansion. Though the Europeans possessed many considerable settlements both upon the coast of Africa and in the East Indies, they have not yet established in either of those regions such numerous and thriving colonies as those in the islands and continent of the America."

Earlier elements related to this were its founding of the Sierra Leone Colony in 1787 as a refuge for freed slaves, the independent missionary movement intended to bring Christianity to the Edo Kingdom, and programs of exploration sponsored by learned societies and scientific groups, such as the London-based African Association.

Local leaders, cognizant of the situation in the West Indies, India, and elsewhere, recognised the risks of British expansion. A chief of Bonny in 1860 explained that he refused a British treaty due to the tendency to "induce the Chiefs to sign a treaty whose meaning they did not understand, and then seize upon the country".

The Headquarters of Gombe emirate was Gombe-Abba until when the then Emir of Gombe, Umaru Kwairanga (1898–1922), was forced to move from Gombe-Abba, a town founded by his grandfather and the founder of Gombe Emirate, Modibbo Bubayero, to Nafada town in 1913, and then to the current Gombe in 1919, that was after Gombe Emirate was conquered by British colonialists in 1903.

=== Slave trade and abolition ===
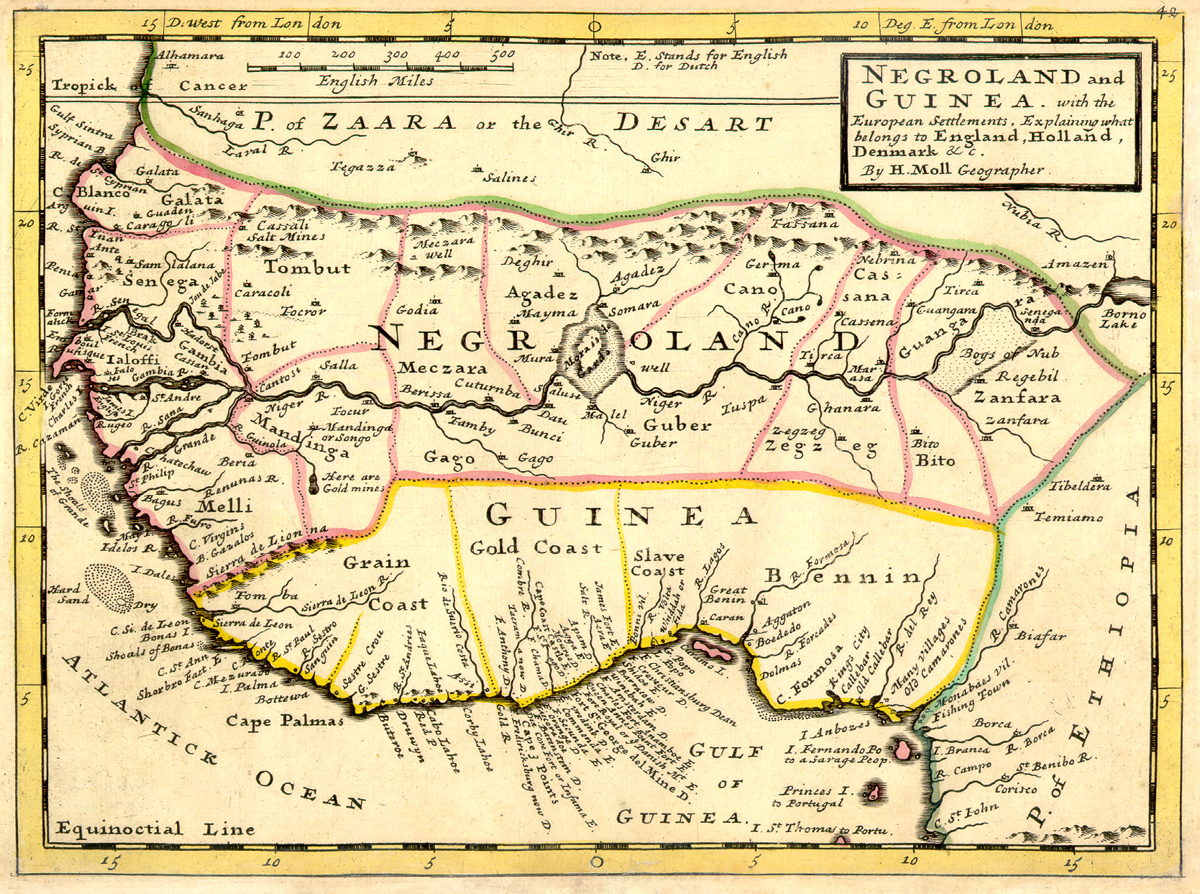
Map of Negroland and Guinea including the Slave Coast, 1736, by London cartographer Hermann Moll

European slave trading from West Africa began before 1650, with people taken at a rate of about 3,000 per year. This rate rose to 20,000 per year in the last quarter of the century. The slave trade was heaviest in the period 1700–1850, with an average of 76,000 people taken from Africa each year between 1783 and 1792. At first, the trade centered around West Central Africa, now the Congo. But in the 1700s, the Bight of Benin (also known as the Slave Coast) became the next most important hub. Ouidah (now part of Benin) and Lagos were the major ports on the coast. From 1790 to 1807, predominantly British slave traders purchased 1,000–2,000 slaves each year in Lagos alone. The trade subsequently continued under the Portuguese Empire. In the Bight of Biafra, the major ports were Old Calabar (Akwa Akpa), Bonny and New Calabar. Starting in 1740, the British were the primary European slave trafficker from this area. In 1767, British traders facilitated a notorious massacre of hundreds of people at Calabar after inviting them onto their ships, ostensibly to settle a local dispute.

In 1807, the Parliament of the United Kingdom enacted the Slave Trade Act, prohibiting British subjects from participating in the Atlantic slave trade. Britain subsequently lobbied other European powers to stop the slave trade as well. It made anti-slavery treaties with West African powers, which it enforced militarily with the blockade of Africa. Some of the treaties contained prohibitions on diplomacy conducted without British permission, or other promises to abide by British rule. This scenario provided an opportunity for naval expeditions and reconnaissance throughout the region. Britain also annexed Freetown in Sierra Leone, declaring it a Crown Colony in 1808.

The decrease in trade indirectly led to the collapse of states like the Edo Empire. Britain withdrew from the slave trade when it was the major transporter of slaves to the Americas. The French had abolished slavery following the French Revolution, although it briefly re-established it in its Caribbean colonies especially Martinique under Napoleon. France sold Louisiana to the United States in 1803, the same year that it gave up on trying to regain Saint-Domingue (Haiti) from the Haitian Revolution. By the end of the Napoleonic Wars, it ended slavery in its possessions. Between them, the French and the British had purchased a majority of the slaves sold from the ports of Edo. The economy suffered from the decline in the slave trade, although considerable smuggling of slaves to the Americas continued for years afterward.

Lagos became a major slave port in the late 1700s and into the 1850s. Much of the human trafficking which occurred there was nominally illegal, and records from this time and place are not comprehensive. According to the Trans-Atlantic Slave Voyage Database, 308,800 were sold across the Atlantic from Lagos in 1776–1850. British and French traders did a large share of this business until 1807 when they were replaced by the Portuguese and the Spaniards. By 1826–1850, the British Royal Navy was intervening significantly with Lagos slave exports.

Whether British conquest of Nigeria resulted from a benevolent motive to end slavery or more instrumental motives of wealth and power, remains a topic of dispute between African and European historians. Many locals remained unconvinced of the Crown's authority to completely reverse the legal and moral attributes of a social institution through fiat. Regardless, slavery had decimated the population and fuelled militarisation and chaos, thereby paving the way for more aggressive colonisation.

=== Missionaries ===
Portuguese Roman Catholic priests who accompanied traders and officials to the West African coast introduced Christianity to the Edo Empire in the fifteenth century. Several churches were built to serve the Edo community and a small number of African converts. When direct Portuguese contacts in the region were withdrawn, however, the influence of the Catholic missionaries waned. By the eighteenth century, evidence of Christianity had disappeared.

Although churchmen in Britain had been influential in the drive to abolish the slave trade, significant missionary activity for Africa did not develop until the 1840s. For some time, missionaries operated in the area between Lagos and Ibadan. The first missions were opened by the Church of England's Church Missionary Society (CMS). Other Protestant denominations from Great Britain, Canada, and the United States also opened missions and, in the 1860s, Roman Catholic religious orders established missions. Protestant missionaries tended to divide the country into spheres of activity to avoid competition with each other, and Catholic missions similarly avoided duplication of effort among the several religious orders working there. Catholic missionaries were particularly active among the Igbo; the CMS worked among the Yoruba.

The CMS initially promoted Africans to responsible positions in the mission field; for instance, they appointed Samuel Ajayi Crowther as the first Anglican Bishop of the Niger. Crowther, a liberated Yoruba slave, had been educated in Sierra Leone and in Britain, where he was ordained before returning to his homeland with the first group of CMS missionaries. The Anglicans and other religious groups had a conscious "native church" policy to develop indigenous ecclesiastical institutions to become independent of Europeans. Crowther was succeeded as bishop by a British cleric. In the long term, the acceptance of Christianity by large numbers of Nigerians depended on the various denominations adapting to local conditions. They selected an increasingly high proportion of African clergy for the missions.

In large measure, European missionaries assumed the value of colonial rule in terms of promoting education, health and welfare measures, thereby effectively reinforcing colonial policy. Some African Christian communities formed their own independent churches. (Note: All of this section to this point is from Nigeria: A Country Study (1991) prepared by staff of the Library of Congress of the United States.)

The missionaries gained in power throughout the 1800s. They caused major transformations in traditional society as they eroded the religious institutions such as human sacrifice, infanticide and secret societies, which had formerly played a role in political authority and community life.

=== Commerce ===
The principal commodities of legitimate trade were palm oil and palm kernels, which were used in Europe to make soap and as lubricants for machinery before petroleum products were developed for that purpose. Although this trade grew to significant proportions—palm oil exports alone were worth £1 million a year by 1840—it was concentrated near the coast, where palm trees grew in abundance. Gradually, however, the trade forced major economic and social changes in the interior, although it hardly undermined slavery and the slave trade. The incidence of slavery in local societies increased.

Initially, most palm oil (and later kernels) came from Igboland, where palm trees formed a canopy over the densely inhabited areas of the Ngwa, Nri Kingdom, Awka and other Igbo peoples. Palm oil was used locally for cooking, the kernels were a source for food, trees were tapped for palm wine, and the fronds were used for building material. It was a relatively simple adjustment for many Igbo families to transport the oil to rivers and streams that led to the Niger Delta for sale to European merchants. The rapid expansion in exports, especially after 1830, occurred precisely at the time slave exports collapsed. The Igbo redirected slaves into the domestic economy, especially to grow the staple food crop, yams and kola nuts, in northern Igboland for marketing throughout the palm-tree belt. As before, Aro merchants dominated trade in the hinterland, including palm products to the coast and the sale of slaves within Igboland.

From 1815 to 1840, palm oil exports increased by a factor of 25, from 800 to 20,000 tons per year. British merchants led the trade in palm oil, while the Portuguese and others continued the slave trade. Much of this oil was sold elsewhere in the British Empire. To produce all this oil, the economy of the southern region crossed over from mostly subsistence to the production of palm oil as a cash crop.

The Niger Delta and Calabar, which once had been known for the export of slaves, became notable for the export of palm oil. The Delta streams were called "oil rivers". The basic economic units in each town were "houses", family-operated entities that engendered loyalty for its employees. A "house" included the extended family of the trader, including retainers and slaves. As its head, the master trader taxed other traders who were members of his "house"; he maintained a war vessel, a large dugout canoe that could hold several tons of cargo and dozens of crews, for the defense of the harbor. Whenever a trader had become successful enough to keep a war canoe, he was expected to form his own "house". Economic competition among these "houses" was so fierce that trade often erupted into an armed battle between the crews of the large canoes.

Because of the hazards of climate and tropical diseases for Europeans and the absence of any centralized authorities on the mainland responsive to their interests, European merchants moored their ships outside harbours or in the delta and used the ships as trading stations and warehouses. In time, they built depots onshore and eventually moved up the Niger River to establish stations in the interior. An example was that at Onitsha, where they could bargain directly with local suppliers and purchase products likely to turn a profit.

Some European traders switched to legitimate business only when the commerce in slaves became too hazardous. The traders suffered from the risks of their position and believed they were at the mercy of the coastal rulers, whom they considered unpredictable. Accordingly, as the volume of trade increased, merchants requested that the Government of the United Kingdom appoint a consul to cover the region. Consequently, in 1849, John Beecroft was accredited as consul for the bights of Benin and Biafra, a jurisdiction stretching from Dahomey to Cameroon. Beecroft was the British representative to Fernando Po, where the African Slave Trade Patrol of the Royal Navy was stationed.

In 1850, the British created a "Court of Equity" at Bonny, overseen by Beecroft, which would deal with trade disputes. Another court was established in 1856 at Calabar, based on an agreement with local Efik traders which prohibited them from interfering with British merchants. These courts contained majorities British members and represented a new level of presumptive British sovereignty in the Bight of Biafra.

West Africa also bought British exports, supplying 30–40% of the demand for British cotton during the Industrial Revolution of 1750–1790.

=== Benin Expedition ===
The Benin Expedition of 1897 was a punitive military campaign carried out by the British Empire against the Kingdom of Benin (in present-day Nigeria). After a British delegation was killed near Benin City, Britain launched a large-scale assault, capturing and burning the capital, exiling Oba Ovonramwen, and effectively ending the kingdom’s sovereignty. Thousands of artworks—now known as the Benin Bronzes—were looted and dispersed to museums and private collections across Europe and North America. The expedition became a defining episode of colonial violence and remains central to ongoing debates about restitution and the return of cultural heritage.

=== Exploration ===
At the same time, British scientists were interested in exploring the course and related settlements along the Niger River. The delta masked the mouth of the great river, and for centuries Nigerians chose not to tell Europeans the secrets of the interior. In 1794, the African Association in Great Britain commissioned Mungo Park, an intrepid Scottish physician and naturalist, to search for the headwaters of the Niger and follow the river downstream. Park reached the upper Niger the next year by travelling inland from the Gambia River. Although he reported on the eastward flow of the Niger, he was forced to turn back when his equipment was lost to Muslim Arab slave traders. In 1805, he set out on a second expedition, sponsored by the British Government, to follow the Niger to the sea. His mission failed, but Park and his party covered more than 1,500 kilometres (930 mi), passing through the western portions of the Sokoto Caliphate, before drowning when their boats overturned in rapids near Bussa.

On a subsequent expedition to the Sokoto Caliphate, Scottish explorer Hugh Clapperton learned about the mouth of the Niger River, and where it reached the sea, but after suffering malaria, depression and dysentery, he died before confirming it. His servant, Richard Lander, and Lander's brother John were the ones to demonstrate that the Niger flowed into the sea. The Lander brothers were seized by slave traders in the interior and sold down the river to a waiting European ship.

Initial British attempts to open trade with the interior by way of the Niger could not overcome climate and diseases such as malaria. A third of the people associated with an 1842 riverine expedition died. In the 1850s, quinine had been found to combat malaria, and aided by the medicine, a Liverpool merchant, Macgregor Laird, opened the river. Laird's efforts were stimulated by the detailed reports of a pioneer German explorer, Heinrich Barth, who travelled through much of Borno and the Sokoto Caliphate, where he recorded information about the region's geography, economy and inhabitants.

== First colonial claims ==
=== Lagos Colony ===
Flag of the Lagos Colony (1886–1906)

British Prime Minister Lord Palmerston detested slavery, and in 1851 he took advantage of divisions in native politics, the presence of Christian missionaries, and the maneuvers of British consul John Beecroft to encourage the overthrow of the regime. In 1851 deposed king Akitoye of Lagos sought British help in restoring him to the throne. Beecroft agreed on condition that the slave trade be abolished, and British merchants have a monopoly in commodities. The Royal Navy bombarded Lagos in November 1851, ousted the pro-slavery Oba Kosoko and established a treaty with the newly installed Oba Akitoye, who was expectedly more amenable to British interests. Lagos was annexed as a Crown Colony in 1861 via the Lagos Treaty of Cession.

British expansion accelerated in the last decades of the nineteenth century. The early history of Lagos Colony was one of repeated attempts to end the Yoruba wars. In the face of threats to the divided Yoruba states from Dahomey and the Sokoto Caliphate, as represented by the emirate of Ilorin, the British Governor—assisted by the CMS—succeeded in imposing peace settlements on the interior.

Colonial Lagos was a busy, cosmopolitan port. Its architecture was in both Victorian and Brazilian style, as many of the black elite were English-speakers from Sierra Leone and freedmen repatriated from the Empire of Brazil and Spanish Cuba. Its residents were employed in official capacities and were active in business. Africans also were represented on the Lagos Legislative Council, a largely appointed assembly. The Colony was ultimately governed by the British Colonial Office in London.

Captain John Glover, the colony's administrator, created a militia of Hausa troops in 1861. This became the Lagos Constabulary, and subsequently the Nigerian Police Force.

In 1880, the British Government and traders demonetised the Maria Theresa dollar, to the considerable dismay of its local holders, in favour of the pound sterling. In 1891, the African Banking Corporation founded the Bank of British West Africa in Lagos.

=== Oil Rivers Protectorate ===
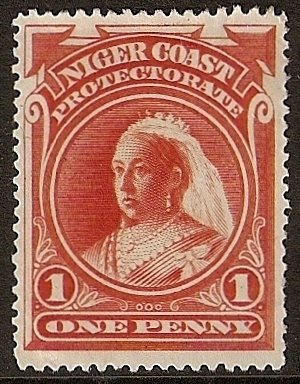
Queen Victoria on a stamp of the Niger Coast Protectorate, 1894

After the Berlin Conference of 1884, Britain announced the formation of the Oil Rivers Protectorate, which included the Niger Delta and extended eastward to Calabar, where the British Consulate General was relocated from Fernando Po. The protectorate was organised to control and develop trade coming down the Niger. Vice consuls were assigned to ports that already had concluded treaties of cooperation with the Foreign Office. Local rulers continued to administer their territories, but consular authorities assumed jurisdiction for the equity courts established earlier by the foreign mercantile communities. A constabulary force was raised and used to pacify the coastal area.

In 1894 the territory was redesignated the Niger Coast Protectorate and was expanded to include the region from Calabar to Lagos Colony and Protectorate, including the hinterland, and northward up the Niger River as far as Lokoja, the headquarters of the Royal Niger Company. As a protectorate, it did not have the status of a colony, so its officials were appointed by the Foreign Office and not by the Colonial Office.

In 1891, the consulate established the Niger Coast Protectorate Force or "Oil Rivers Irregulars".

== Royal Niger Company ==
Ensign of the Royal Niger Company (1888–1899)

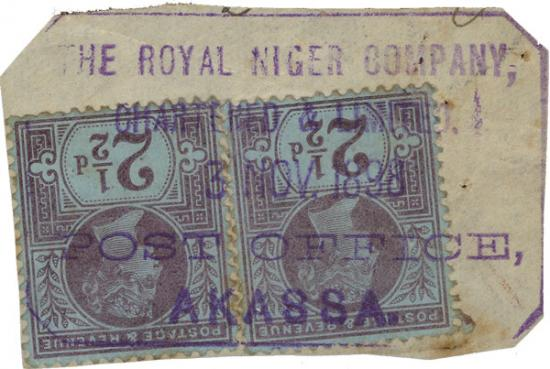
British stamps used in 1898 at Akassa by the Royal Niger Company

The legitimate trade in commodities attracted a number of British merchants to the Niger River, as well as some men who had been formerly engaged in the slave trade but who now changed their line of wares. The large companies that subsequently opened depots in the delta cities and in Lagos were as ruthlessly competitive as the delta towns themselves and frequently used force to compel potential suppliers to agree to contracts and to meet their demands. To some extent, competition amongst these companies undermined their collective position vis-à-vis, local merchants.

In the 1870s, therefore, George Taubman Goldie began amalgamating companies into the United African Company, soon renamed the National African Company. Ultimately, this became the Royal Niger Company.

The Royal Niger Company established its headquarters far inland at Lokoja, which was the main trading port of the company, from where it began to assume responsibility for the administration of areas along the Niger and Benue rivers where it maintained depots. It soon gained a virtual monopoly over trade along the River

The company interfered in the territory along the Niger and the Benue, sometimes becoming embroiled in serious conflicts when its British-led native constabulary intercepted slave raids or attempted to protect trade routes. The company negotiated treaties with Sokoto, Gwandu and Nupe that were interpreted as guaranteeing exclusive access to trade in return for the payment of annual tribute. Officials of the Sokoto Caliphate considered these treaties quite differently; from their perspective, the British were granted only extraterritorial rights that did not prevent similar arrangements with the Germans and the French and certainly did not surrender sovereignty.

Even before gaining its charter, the Company signed treaties with local leaders which granted it broad sovereign powers. One 1885 treaty read:

We, the undersigned King and Chiefs […] with the view to the bettering of the condition of our country and people, do this day cede to the National Africa Company (Limited), their heirs and assigns, forever, the whole of our territory […] We also give the said National African Company (Limited) full power to settle all native disputes arising from any cause whatever, and we pledge ourselves not to enter into any war with other tribes without the sanction of the said National Africa Company (Limited).

We also understand that the said National African Company (limited) have full power to mine, farm, and build in any portion of our territory. We bind ourselves not to have any intercourse with any strangers or foreigners except through the said national African Company (Limited), and we give the said National African Company (Limited) full power to exclude all other strangers and foreigners from their territory at their discretion.

In consideration of the foregoing, the said National African Company (Limited) bind themselves not to interfere with any of the native laws or customs of the country, consistently with the maintenance of order and good government … [and] agree to pay native owners of land a reasonable amount for any portion they may require.

The said National African Company (Limited) bind themselves to protect the said King and Chiefs from the attacks of any neighbouring tribes (Ibid.).

The company considered itself the sole legitimate government of the area, with executive, legislative and judicial powers all subordinate to the rule of a council created by the company board of directors in London. The council was headed by a Governor. The Deputy Governor served as political administrator for company territory and appointed three officials in Nigeria to carry out the work of administration. These were the Agent-General, the Senior Judicial Officer, and the Commandant of the Constabulary. However, the company did accept that local kings could act as partners in governance and trade. It, therefore, hired native intermediaries who could conduct diplomacy, trade and intelligence work in the local area.

The company, as was common among European businesses in Africa, paid its native workers in barter. At the turn of the century, top wages were four bags of salt (company retail price, 3s 9d) for a month of work. Trade was also conducted through a mechanism of barter and credit. Goods were made available on credit to African middlemen, who were expected to trade them at a pre-arranged price and deliver the proceeds to the company. The company's major imports to the area included gin and low-quality firearms.

By the 1880s, the National African Company became the dominant commercial power, increasing from 19 to 39 stations between 1882 and 1893. In 1886, Taubman secured a royal charter and his company became the Royal Niger Company. The charter allowed the company to collect customs and make treaties with local leaders.

Under Goldie's direction, the Royal Niger Company was instrumental in depriving France and Germany of access to the region. Consequently, he may well deserve the epithet of the "father of Nigeria", which historians accorded him. He definitely laid the basis for British claims.

The Royal Niger Company had its own armed forces. This included a river fleet which it used for retaliatory attacks on uncooperative villages.

Britain's imperialistic posture became more aggressive towards the end of the century. The appointment of Joseph Chamberlain as colonial secretary in 1895 especially marked a shift towards new territorial ambitions of the British Empire. Economically, local colonial administrators also pushed for the imposition of British colonial rule, believing that trade and taxation conducted in British pounds would prove far more lucrative than a barter trade which yielded only inconsistent customs duties.

== Military conquest ==
The British led a series of military campaigns to enlarge its sphere of influence and expand its commercial opportunities. Most of the fighting was done by Hausa soldiers, recruited to fight against other groups. The superior weapons, tactics, and political unity of the British are commonly given as reasons for their decisive ultimate victory.

In 1892, the British Armed Forces set out to fight the Ijebu Kingdom, which had resisted missionaries and foreign traders. The legal justification for this campaign was a treaty signed in 1886, when the British had interceded as peacemakers to end the Ekiti Parapo war, which imposed free trade requirements and mandated that all parties continue to use British channels for diplomacy. Although the Ijebu had some weapons they were wiped out by British Maxims, the earliest machine gun. With this victory, the British went on to conquer the rest of Yorubaland, which had also been weakened by sixteen years of civil war. By 1893, most of the other political entities in Yorubaland recognised the practical necessity of signing another treaty with the British, this one explicitly joining them with the protectorate of Lagos.

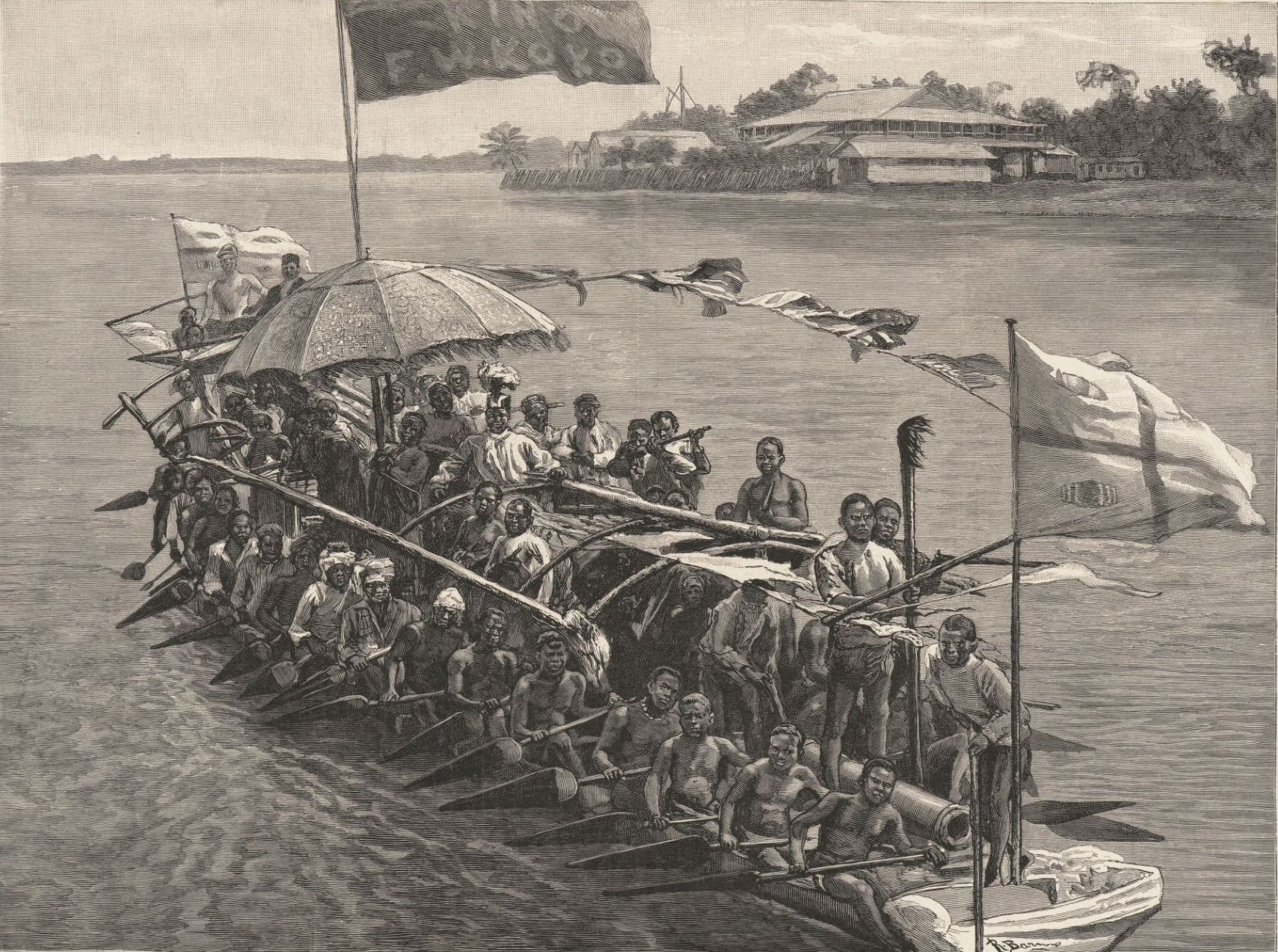
King Koko in His War Canoe, London Daily Graphic, 30 March 1895; depicting King Frederick William Koko—onetime antagonist to the Royal Niger Company

In 1896–1897, the forces of the Niger Coast Protectorate fought with the remnants of the Edo Empire. Following the defeat of an unsuccessful foray by Consul General James R. Phillips, a larger retaliatory force captured Benin City and drove Ovonramwen, the Oba of Benin, into exile.

The British had difficulty conquering Igboland, which lacked a central political organisation. In the name of liberating the Igbos from the Aro Confederacy, the British launched the Anglo-Aro War of 1901–1902. Despite conquering villages by burning houses and crops, continual political control over the Igbo remained elusive. The British forces began annual pacification missions to convince the locals of British supremacy.

A campaign against the Sokoto Caliphate began in 1900 with the creation of the Protectorate of Northern Nigeria, under the direction of Governor Lugard. The British captured Kano in 1903. Deadly battles broke out sporadically through 1906. Lugard was slow to describe these excursions to the Colonial Office, which apparently learned of preparations to attack Kano from the newspapers in December 1902. Not wishing to appear out of control or weak, they approved the expedition (two days after it began) on 19 January 1903. In general, the Colonial Office allowed Lugard's expeditions to continue because they were framed as retaliatory and, as Olivier commented in 1906, "If the millions of people [in Nigeria] who do not want us there once get the notion that our people can be killed with impunity they will not be slow to attempt it."

Lugard informed the leaders of conquered Sokoto:

The Fulani in old times […] conquered this country. They took the right to rule over it, to levy taxes, to depose kings and to create kings. They, in turn, have by defeat lost their rule which has come into the hands of the British. All these things which I have said the Fulani by conquest took the right to do now pass to the British. Every Sultan and Emir and the principal officers of state will be appointed by the high Commissioner throughout all this country. The High Commissioner will be guided by all the usual laws of succession and the wishes of the people and chief but will set them aside if he desires for good cause to do so. The Emirs and chiefs who are appointed will rule over the people as of old-time and take such taxes as are approved by the High Commissioner, but they will obey the laws of the Governor and will act in accordance with the advice of the Resident.

== Political administration under the Crown ==
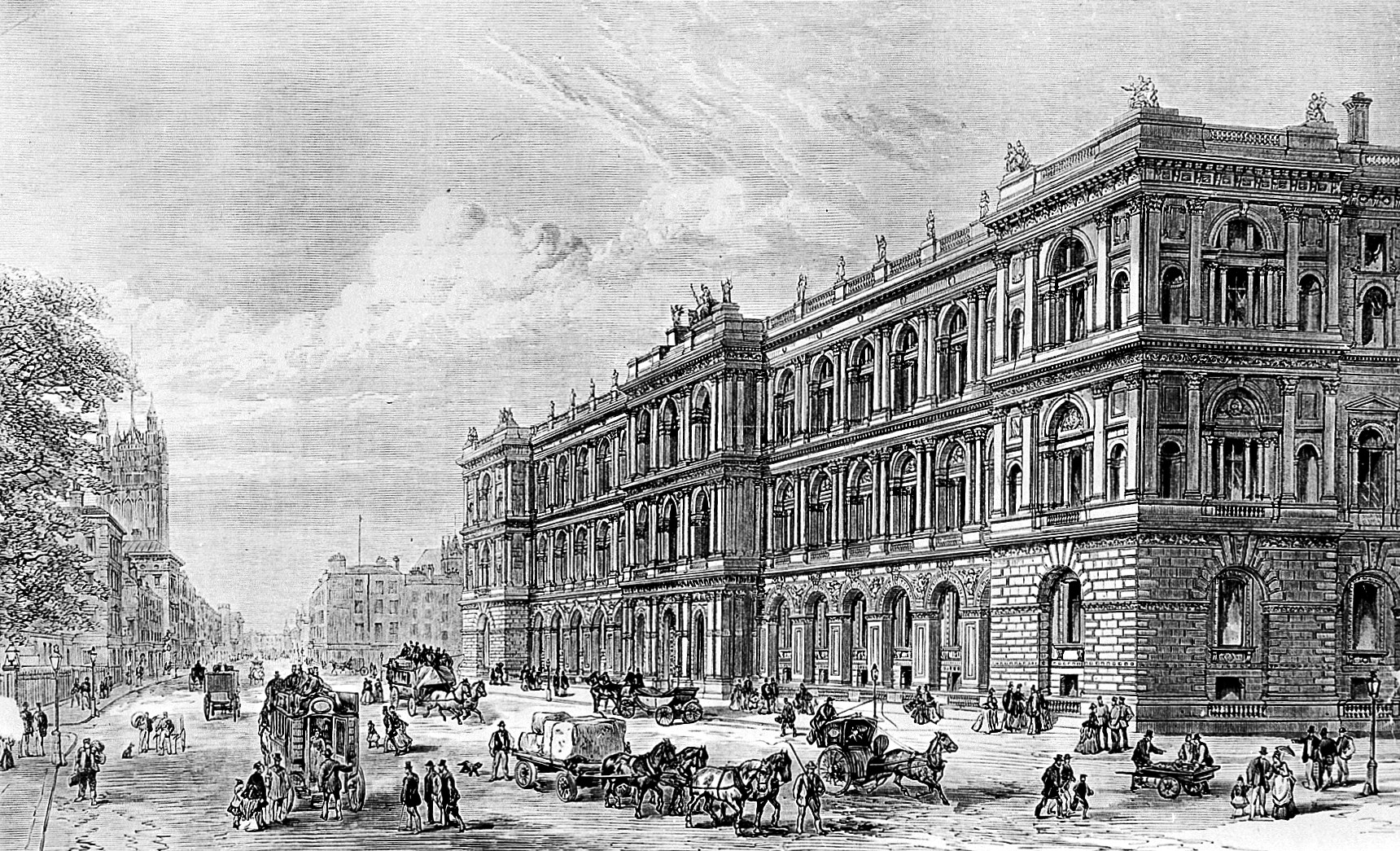
The British Colonial Office in Westminster, created in the 1860s by architect George Gilbert Scott; illustrated in 1875

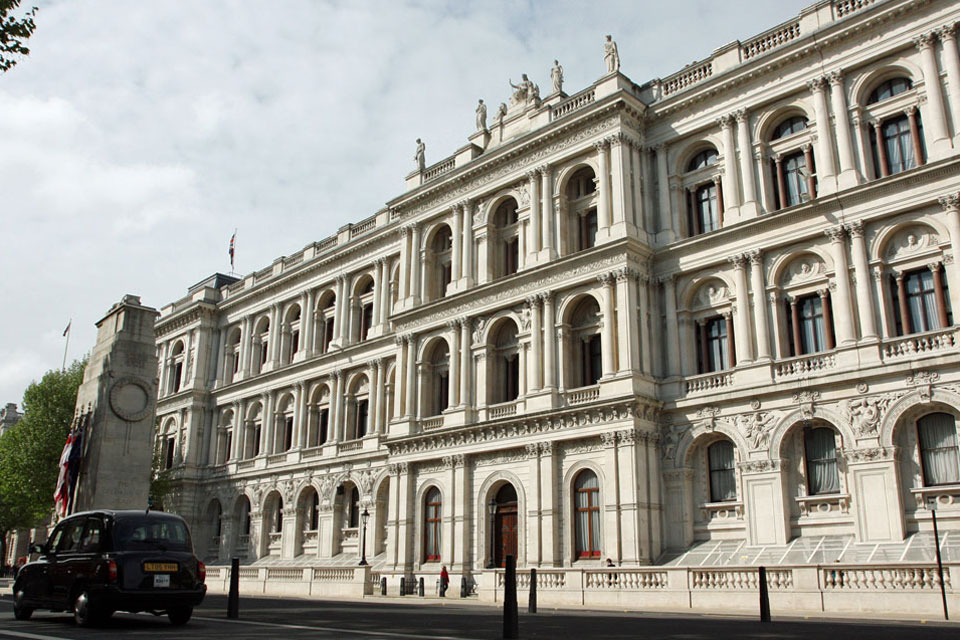
Contemporary photograph of the same building, now housing the Foreign, Commonwealth and Office

=== Transition to Crown rule ===
Concrete plans for transition to Crown rule—direct control by the British Government—apparently began in 1897. In May of this year, Herbert J. Read published a Memorandum on British possessions in West Africa, which remarked upon the "inconvenient and unscientific boundaries" between Lagos Colony, the Niger Coast Protectorate and the Royal Niger Company. Read suggested they be merged, and more use made of Nigeria's natural resources. In the same year, the British created the Royal West African Frontier Force (RWAFF or WAFF), under the leadership of Colonel Frederick Lugard. In one year, Lugard recruited 2600 troops, evenly split between Hausa and Yoruba. The officers of the RWAFF were British. The operations of this force are still not fully known due to a policy of strict secrecy mandated by the British Government.

Guidelines for running the Nigerian colony were established in 1898 by the Niger Committee, chaired by the Earl of Selborne, in 1898. The British finalized the border between Nigeria and French West Africa with the Anglo-French Convention of 1898.

The territory of the Royal Niger Company became the Northern Nigeria Protectorate, and the Company itself became a private corporation which continued to do business in Nigeria. The company received £865,000 compensation for the loss of its Charter. It continued to enjoy special privileges and maintained a de facto monopoly over commerce. Under Lugard from 1900 to 1906, the Protectorate consolidated political control over the area through military conquest and initiated the use of British currency in substitute for barter.

=== Colonial administration ===
In 1900, the British Government assumed control of the Southern and Northern Protectorates, both of which were ultimately governed by the Colonial Office at Whitehall. The staff of this office came primarily from the British upper-middle class—i.e., university-educated men, primarily not nobility, with fathers in well-respected professions. The first five heads of the Nigeria Department (1898–1914) were Reginald Antrobus, William Mercer, William Baillie Hamilton, Sydney Olivier, and Charles Strachey. Olivier was a member of the Fabian Society and a friend of George Bernard Shaw.

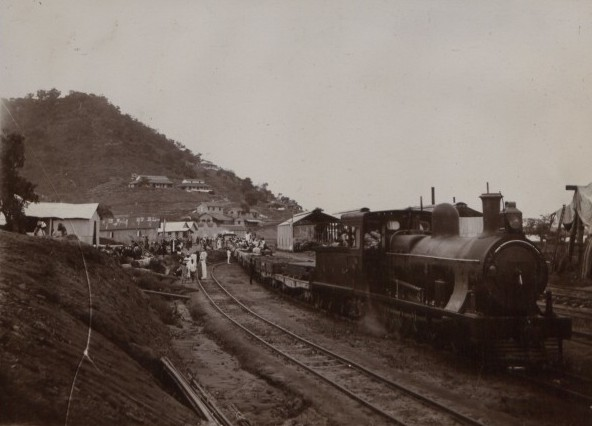
Undated British archival photo of a locomotive in Nigeria

Under the Colonial Office was the Governor, who managed the administration of his colony and held powers of emergency rule. The Colonial Office could veto or revise his policies. The seven men who governed Northern Nigeria, Southern Nigeria and Lagos through 1914 were Henry McCallum, William MacGregor, Walter Egerton, Ralph Moor, Percy Girouard, Hesketh Bell and Frederick Lugard. Most of these came from military backgrounds. All were knighted.

Walter Egerton's sixfold agenda for 1908, as detailed on 29 November 1907, in a telegram to the Colonial Office, is representative of British priorities.

1. To pacify the country;
2. To establish settled government in the newly won districts;
3. To improve and extend native footpaths throughout the country;
4. To construct properly graded roads in the more populated districts;
5. To clear the numerous rivers in the country and make them suitable for launch and canoe traffic; and
6. To extend the railways.

Egerton also supervised improvements to the Lagos harbour and extension of the local telegraph network.

From 1895 to 1900, a railway was constructed running from Lagos to Ibadan; it opened in March 1901. This line was extended to Oshogbo, 100 kilometres (62 mi) away, in 1905–1907, and to Zungeru and Minna in 1908–1911. Its final leg enabled it to meet another line, constructed 1907–1911, running from Baro, through Minnia, to Kano.

Some of these public work projects were accomplished with the help of forced labour from native black Africans, referred to as "Political Labour". Village Heads were paid 10 shillings for conscripts and fined £50 if they failed to supply. Individuals could be fined or jailed for refusing to comply.

=== Frederick Lugard ===
Frederick Lugard, who was appointed as High Commissioner of the Northern Nigeria Protectorate in 1900 and served until 1906 in his first term, often has been regarded by the British as their model colonial administrator. Trained as an army officer, he had served in India, Egypt and East Africa, where he expelled Arab slave traders from Nyasaland and established British presence in Uganda. Joining the Royal Niger Company in 1894, Lugard was sent to Borgu to counter inroads made by the French, and in 1897 he was made responsible for raising the Royal West African Frontier Force (RWAFF) from local levies to serve under British officers.

During his six-year tenure as High Commissioner, Sir Frederick Lugard (as he became in 1901) was occupied with transforming the commercial sphere of influence inherited from the Royal Niger Company into a viable territorial unit under effective British political control. His objective was to conquer the entire region and to obtain recognition of the British protectorate by its indigenous rulers, especially the Fulani emirs of the Sokoto Caliphate. Lugard's campaign systematically subdued local resistance, using armed force when diplomatic measures failed. Borno capitulated without a fight, but in 1903 Lugard's RWAFF mounted assaults on Kano and Sokoto. From Lugard's point of view, clear-cut military victories were necessary because the surrenders of the defeated peoples weakened resistance elsewhere.

Lugard's success in northern Nigeria has been attributed to his policy of indirect rule; that is, he governed the protectorate through the rulers defeated by the British. If the emirs accepted British authority, abandoned the slave trade, and cooperated with British officials in modernizing their administrations, the colonial power was willing to confirm them in office. The emirs retained their caliphate titles but were responsible to British district officers, who had final authority. The British High Commissioners could depose emirs and other officials if necessary.

=== Amalgamation ===
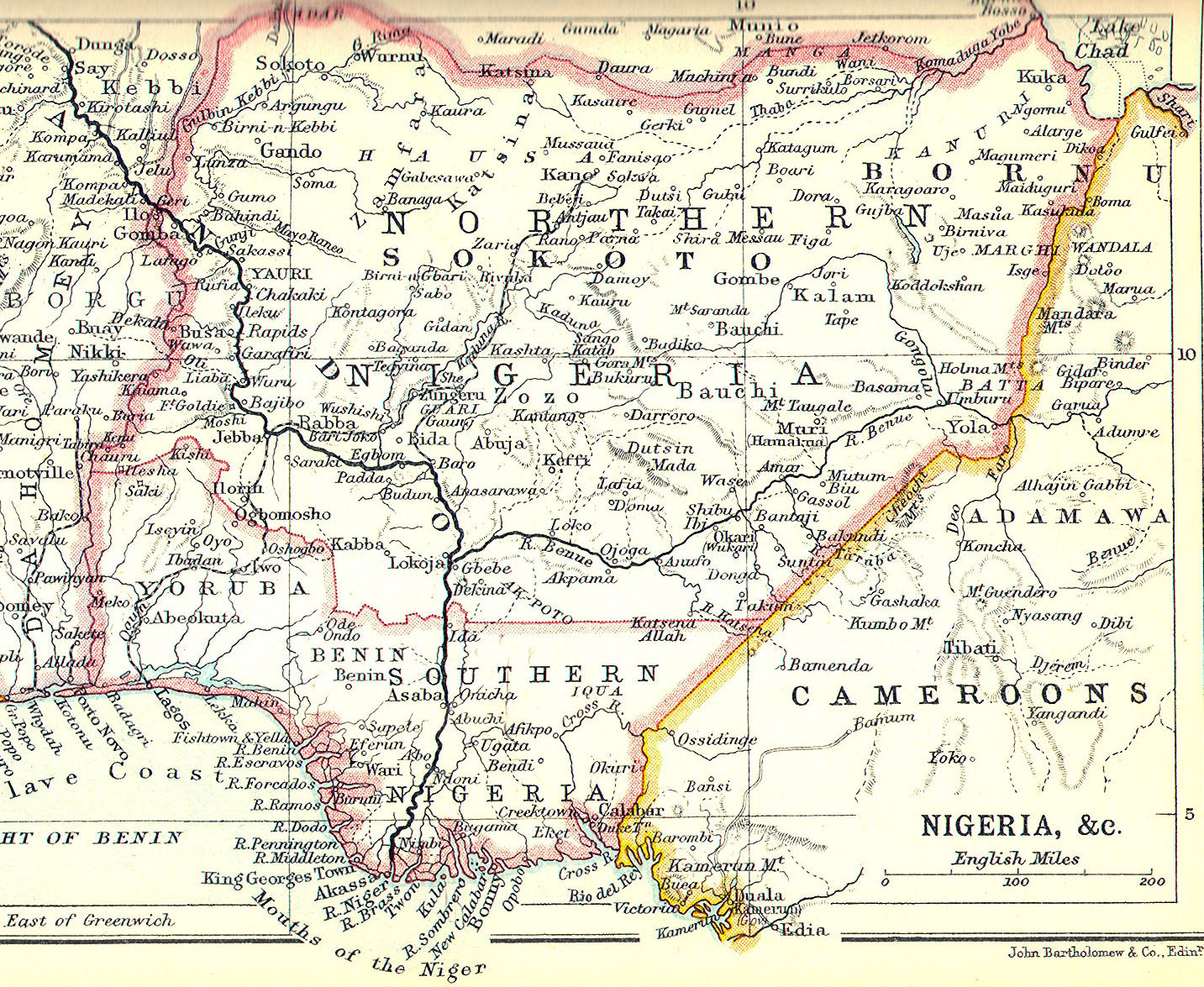
A map displaying Southern and Northern Nigeria, 1914

Amalgamation of Nigeria was envisioned from early on in its governance, as is made clear by the report of the Niger Committee in 1898. Combining the three jurisdictions would reduce administrative expenses and facilitate deployment of resources and money between the areas (Specifically, it would enable direct subsidy of the less profitable Northern jurisdiction). Antrobus, Fiddes, and Strachey in the Colonial Office promoted amalgamation, along with Lugard.

Following the order recommended by the Niger Committee, the Colonial Office merged Lagos Colony and the Southern Nigeria Protectorate on 1 May 1906, forming a larger protectorate (still called the Southern Nigeria Protectorate) which spanned the coastline between Dahomey and Cameroon.

Lugard advocated constantly for the unification of the whole territory, and in August 1911 the Colonial Office asked Lugard to lead the amalgamated colony.

In 1912, Lugard returned to Nigeria from his six-year term as Governor of Hong Kong to oversee the merger of the northern and southern protectorates. On 9 May, 1913, Lugard submitted a formal proposal to the Colonial Office in which Northern and Southern provinces would have separate administrations, under the control of a "strongly authoritarian" Governor-General. The Colonial Office approved most of Lugard's plan but balked at authorising him to pass laws without their approval. John Anderson diplomatically suggested:

If it is the necessity for formally submitting the drafts that hurts Sir F. Lugard, I should be quite prepared to omit that provision provided that the period of publication of the draft prior to enactment is extended from one month to two. If an eye is kept on the Gazettes as they come in this will enable us to warn him of any objections we may entertain to legislative proposals, and also give Liverpool and Manchester an opportunity of voicing their objections.

The task of unification was achieved on the eve of World War I. From January 1914 onwards, the newly united colony and protectorate was presided over by a proconsul, who was entitled the Governor-General of Nigeria. The militias and RWAFF battalions were reorganized into the RWAFF Nigeria Regiment.

Lugard's governmental model for Nigeria was unique and there was apparently not much planning for its future development. Colonial official A. J. Harding commented in 1913:

Sir F. Lugard's proposal contemplates a state which it is impossible to classify. It is not a unitary state with local government areas but with one Central Executive and one Legislature. It is not a federal state with federal Executive, Legislature and finances, like the Leewards. It is not a personal union of separate colonies under the same Governor as the Windwards, it is not a Confederation of States. If adopted, his proposals can hardly be a permanent solution and I gather that Sir F. Lugard only regards them as temporary—at any rate in part. With one man in practical control of the Executive and Legislative organs of all the parts, the machine may work passably for sufficient time to enable the transition period to be left behind, by which time the answer to the problem—Unitary v. Federal State—will probably have become clear.

The Colonial Office accepted Lugard's proposal that the Governor would not be required to stay in-country full-time; consequently, as Governor, Lugard spent four months out of the year in London. This scheme proved unpopular and confusing to many involved parties and was phased out.

=== Indirect rule ===
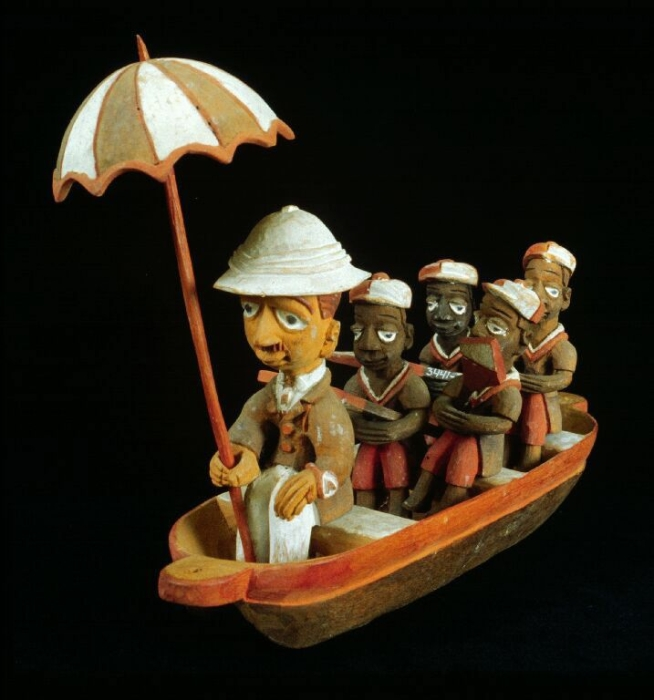
Yoruba sculpture from colonial period depicting a British district officer

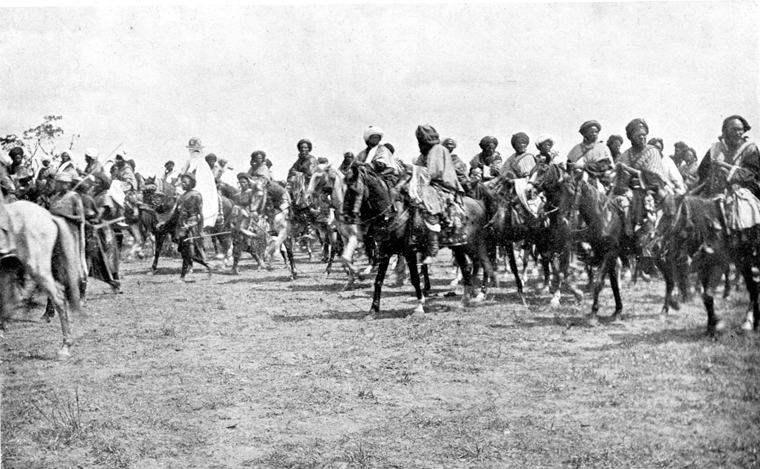
The Emir of Kano, with cavalry, photographed in 1911

The Protectorate was centrally administered by the Colonial Civil Service, staffed by Britons and Africans called the British Native Staff—many of whom originated from outside the territory. Under the Political Department of the Civil Service were Residents and District Officers, responsible for overseeing operations in each region. The Resident also oversaw a Provincial Court at the region's capital.

Each region also had a Native Administration, staffed by locals, and possessing a Native Treasury. The Native Administration was headed by the traditional rulers—mostly emirs in the north and often obas in the south—and their District Heads, who oversaw a larger number of Village Heads. Native Administration was responsible for police, hospitals, public works and local courts. The Colonial Civil Service used intermediaries, as the Royal Niger Company had, in an expanded role which included diplomacy, propaganda and espionage.

Half of all taxes went to the colonial government and half went to the Native Treasury. The Treasury used a planned budget for payment of staff and development of public works projects, and therefore could not be spent at the discretion of the local traditional ruler. Herbert Richmond Palmer developed details of this model from 1906 to 1911 as the Commissioner of Native Revenue in Northern Nigeria after Lugard.

In 1916 Lugard formed the Nigerian Council, a consultative body that brought together six traditional rulers—including the Sultan of Sokoto, the Emir of Kano and the Oba of Benin—to represent all parts of the colony. The council was promoted as a device for allowing the expression of opinions that could instruct the Governor-General. In practice, Lugard used the annual sessions to inform the traditional rulers of British policy, leaving them with no functions at the council's meetings except to listen and to assent.

Unification meant only the loose affiliation of three distinct regional administrations into which Nigeria was subdivided—Northern, Western and Eastern regions. Each was under a Lieutenant Governor and provided independent government services. The Governor was, in effect, the coordinator for virtually autonomous entities that had overlapping economic interests but little in common politically or socially. In the Northern Region, the colonial government took careful account of Islam and avoided any appearance of a challenge to traditional values that might incite resistance to British rule.

This system, in which the structure of authority focused on the emir to whom obedience was a mark of religious devotion, did not welcome change. As the emirs settled more and more into their role as reliable agents of indirect rule, colonial authorities were content to maintain the status quo, particularly in religious matters. Christian missionaries were barred, and the limited government efforts in education were harmonized with Islamic institutions.

In the south, by contrast, traditional rulers were employed as vehicles of indirect rule in Edoland and Yorubaland, but Christianity and Western education undermined their sacerdotal functions. In some instances, however, a double allegiance—to the idea of sacred monarchy for its symbolic value and to modern concepts of law and administration—was maintained. Out of reverence for traditional kingship, for instance, the Oba of Benin, whose office was closely identified with Edo religion, was accepted as the sponsor of a Yoruba political movement. In the Eastern Region, appointed officials who were given "warrants" and hence called warrant chiefs, were strongly resisted by the people because they lacked traditional claims.

In the early stages of British rule, it is desirable to retain the native authority and to work through and by the native emirs. At the same time it is feasible by degrees to bring them gradually into approximation with our ideas of justice and humanity. … In pursuance of the above general principles the chief civil officers of the provinces are to be called Residents which implies one who carries on diplomatic relations rather than Commissioners or Administrators.

— Frederick Lugard, shortly before becoming High Commissioner of Northern Nigeria.

In practice, British administrative procedures under indirect rule entailed constant interaction between colonial authorities and local rulers—the system was modified to fit the needs of each region. In the north, for instance, legislation took the form of a decree cosigned by the Governor and the emir, while in the south, the Governor sought the approval of the Legislative Council. Hausa was recognised as an official language in the north, and knowledge of it was expected of colonial officers serving there. In the South, only English had official status. Regional administrations also varied widely in the quality of local personnel and in the scope of the operations they were willing to undertake. British staffs in each region continued to operate according to procedures developed before unification. Economic links among the regions increased, but indirect rule tended to discourage political interchange. There was virtually no pressure for greater unity among the regions until after the end of World War II.

Public works, such as harbour dredging and road and railway construction, opened Nigeria to economic development. British soap and cosmetics manufacturers tried to obtain land concessions for growing oil palms, but these were refused. Instead, the companies had to be content with a monopoly of the export trade in these products. Other commercial crops, such as cocoa and rubber, were encouraged, and tin was mined on the Jos Plateau.

The only significant interruption in economic development arose from natural disaster—the Great Drought of 1913–14. Recovery came quickly and improvements in port facilities and the transportation infrastructure during World War I furthered economic development. Nigerian recruits participated in the war effort as labourers and soldiers. The Nigeria Regiment of the RWAFF, integrating troops from the north and south, saw action against German colonial forces in Cameroon and in German East Africa.

During the war, the colonial government earmarked a large portion of the Nigerian budget as a contribution to imperial defence. To raise additional revenues, Lugard took steps to institute a uniform tax structure patterned on the traditional system that he had adopted in the north during his tenure there. Taxes became a source of discontent in the south, however, and contributed to disturbances protesting British policy. In 1920, portions of former German Cameroon were mandated to Britain by the League of Nations and were administered as part of Nigeria.

The British entry into World War I saw the confiscation of Nigerian palm oil firms operated by expatriates from the Central Powers. British business interests wanted to use this to create a monopoly over the industry, but Prime Minister H. H. Asquith's Liberal government and subsequent war coalition favored allowing international free trade. In 1916, Sir Edward Carson led the majority of the Conservative and Unionist Party to vote against Party Leader Bonar Law on the issue, forcing it to withdraw from the Asquith coalition and for the government to begin to break apart. It was replaced by a new coalition government led by David Lloyd George featuring Conservatives and Lloyd George's supporters in the Liberal Party, while Asquith and the remainder of the Liberals entered opposition.

Until he stepped down as Governor-General in 1918, Lugard primarily was concerned with consolidating British sovereignty and with assuring local administration through traditional rulers. He was contemptuous of the educated and Westernised African elite found more in the South, and he recommended transferring the capital from Lagos, the cosmopolitan city where the influence of these people was most pronounced, to Kaduna in the north. Although the capital was not moved, Lugard's bias in favour of the Muslim north was clear at the time. Lugard bequeathed to his successor a prosperous colony when his term as Governor-General expired.

The policy of indirect rule used in Northern Nigeria became a model for British colonies elsewhere in Africa.

=== Developments in colonial policy under Clifford ===
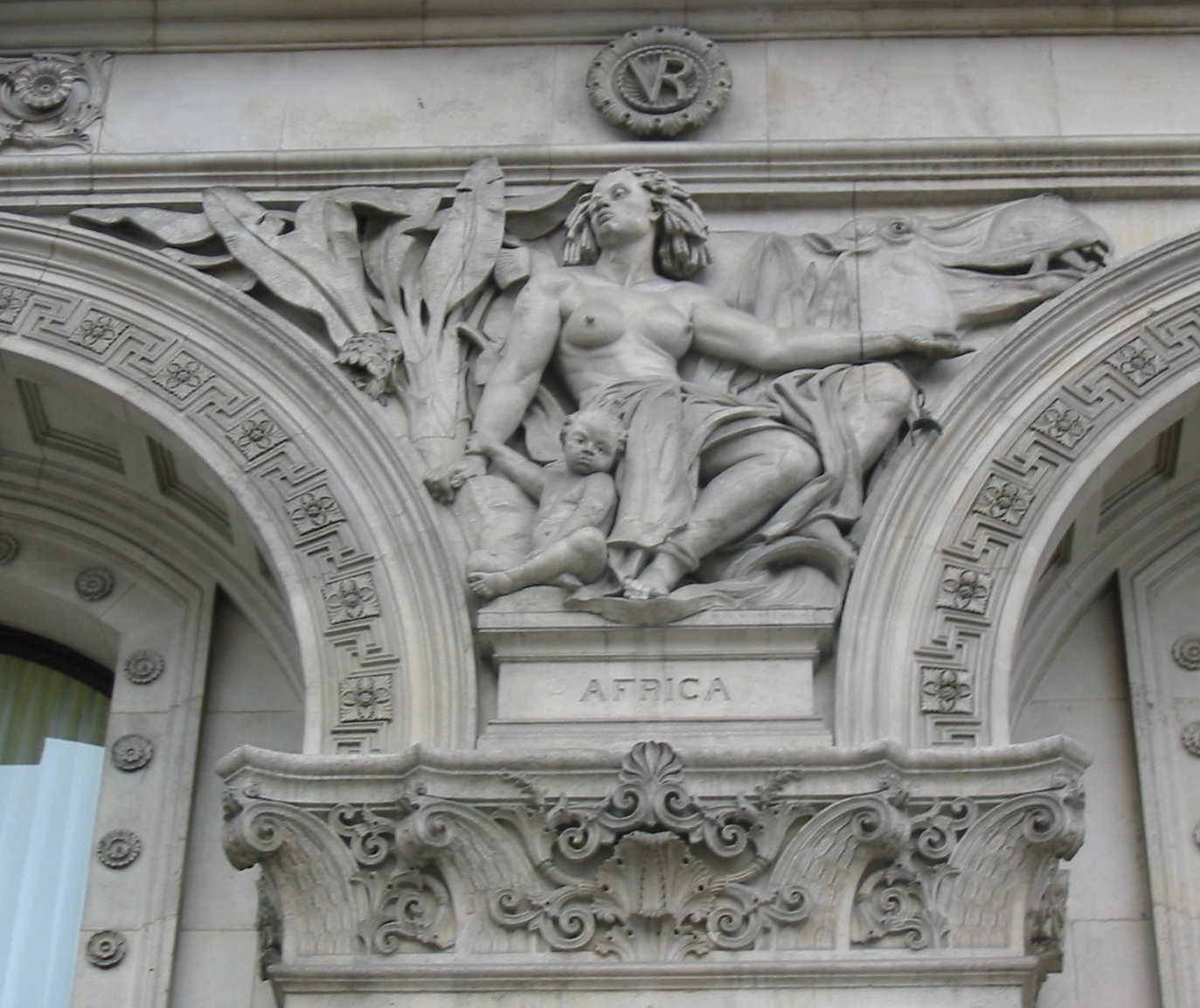
Sculptural representation of Africa at the Colonial Office building on Whitehall street; created by Henry Hugh Armstead

Lugard's immediate successor (1919–1925), Sir Hugh Clifford, was an aristocratic professional administrator with liberal instincts who had won recognition for his enlightened governorship of the Gold Coast in 1912–1919. The approaches of the two men to colonial development were diametrically opposed. In contrast to Lugard, Clifford argued that colonial government had the responsibility to introduce as quickly as practical the benefits of Western experience. He was aware that the Muslim north would present problems, but he had hopes for progress along the lines which he laid down in the south, where he anticipated "general emancipation" leading to a more representative form of government. Clifford emphasized economic development, encouraging enterprises by immigrant southerners in the north while restricting European participation to capital intensive activity. Missionary forces demanded prohibition of liquor, which proved highly unpopular. Both Africans and Europeans found illegal supplies such as secret stills, obtaining colonial liquor permits, and smuggling. This experiment in prohibition began in 1890 and was repealed in 1939.

Uneasy with the amount of latitude allowed traditional rulers under indirect rule, Clifford opposed further extension of the judicial authority held by the northern emirs. He said that he did "not consider that their past traditions and their present backward cultural conditions afford to any such experiment a reasonable chance of success". In the south, he saw the possibility of building an elite educated in schools modelled on a European method (and numerous elite children attended high-ranking colleges in Britain during the colonial years). These schools would teach "the basic principles that would and should regulate character and conduct". In line with this attitude, he rejected Lugard's proposal for moving the capital from Lagos, the stronghold of the elite in whom he placed so much confidence for the future.

Clifford also believed that indirect rule encouraged centripetal tendencies. He argued that the division into two separate colonies was advisable unless a stronger central government could bind Nigeria into more than just an administrative convenience for the three regions. Whereas Lugard had applied lessons learned in the north to the administration of the south, Clifford was prepared to extend to the north practices that had been successful in the south. Sir Richmond Palmer, acting as Lieutenant Governor in the North, disagreed with Clifford and advocated the principles of Lugard and further decentralisation.

The Colonial Office, where Lugard was still held in high regard, accepted that changes might be due in the south, but it forbade fundamental alteration of procedures in the north. A.J. Harding, director of Nigerian affairs at the Colonial Office, defined the official position of the British Government in support of indirect rule when he said that "direct government by impartial and honest men of alien race […] never yet satisfied a nation long and […] under such a form of government, as wealth and education increase, so do political discontent and sedition".

=== Influenza Pandemic of 1918 ===
The Influenza pandemic made its way to the port of Lagos by September 1918 by way of a number of ships including the SS Panayiotis, the SS Ahanti, and the SS Bida. The spread of the disease was quick and deadly, with an estimated 1.5% of the population of Lagos falling victim. The disease first found its home among the many trading ports along the West African coast. But with the advancement and efficiency of colonial transportation networks, it was only a matter of time before the disease began to spread into the interior.

Africa as a whole was hit by three waves of H1N1 influenza A, the first and second would be the most deadly for the colony of Nigeria. The colonial government was not equipped nor ready in general for such a situation. In direct reaction to the epidemic, colonial authorities allowed African doctors and medical personnel to work with influenza patients due to the severity of the situation. The colonial government would enact new legislation in reaction to the pandemic including travel passes for individuals in the colony, increased usage of sanitary practices, and door to door checks on indigenous Nigerian households.

Due to the failure of the sanitation officers in Lagos, the virus would continue to spread throughout the southern provinces throughout September and finally make its way into the hinterlands by October. An estimated 500,000 Nigerians would lose their lives due to the pandemic, severely decreasing production capabilities on Nigerian farms and plantations.

== Economics and finance ==
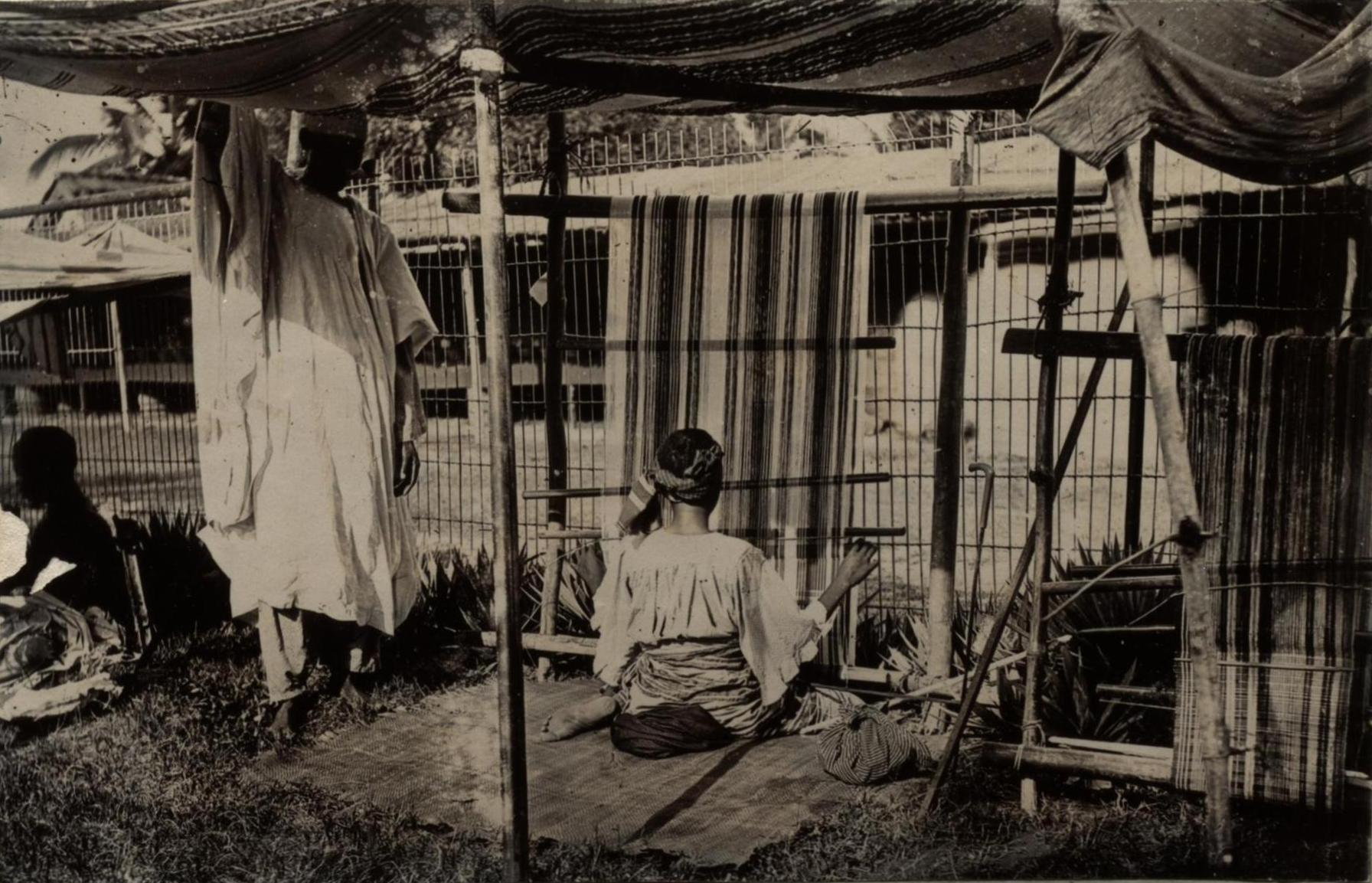
Looms in Lagos, photographed in 1910–1913 by H. Hunting of the Patterson Zuchonis trading company

The British treasury initially supported the landlocked Northern Nigeria Protectorate with grants, totalling £250,000 or more each year. Its revenue quickly increased, from £4,424 in 1901 to £274,989 in 1910. The Southern Protectorate financed itself from the outset, with revenue increasing from £361,815 to £1,933,235 over the same period.

After establishing political control of the country, the British implemented a system of taxation in order to force the indigenous Africans to shift from subsistence farming to wage labour. Sometimes forced labour was used directly for public works projects. These policies were met with resistance.

Much of the colony's budget went to payments of its military, the Royal West African Frontier Force (RWAFF). In 1936, of £6,259,547 income for the Nigerian state, £1,156,000 went back to England as home pay for British officials in the Nigerian civil service.

Oil exploration began in 1906 under John Simon Bergheim's Nigeria Bitumen Corporation, to which the Colonial Office granted exclusive rights. In 1907, the corporation received a loan of £25,000, repayable upon discovery of oil. Other firms applying for licenses were rejected. In November 1908, Bergheim reported striking oil; in September 1909, he reported extracting 2,000 barrels per day. However, development of the Nigerian oilfields slowed when Bergheim died in a car crash in September 1912. Lugard, replacing Egerton as Governor, aborted the project in May 1913. The British turned to Persia for oil.

European traders in Nigeria initially made widespread use of the cowrie, which was already valued locally. The influx of cowrie led to inflation.

In April 1927, the British colonial government in Nigeria took measures to enforce the Native Revenue (Amendment) Ordinance. Direct taxation on men was introduced in 1928 without major incidents. However, in October 1929 in Oloko, a census related to taxation was conducted, and the women in the area suspected that this was a prelude to the extension of direct taxation, which had been imposed on the men the previous year. This led to protests known as the Women's War.

== Emergence of Southern Nigerian nationalism ==
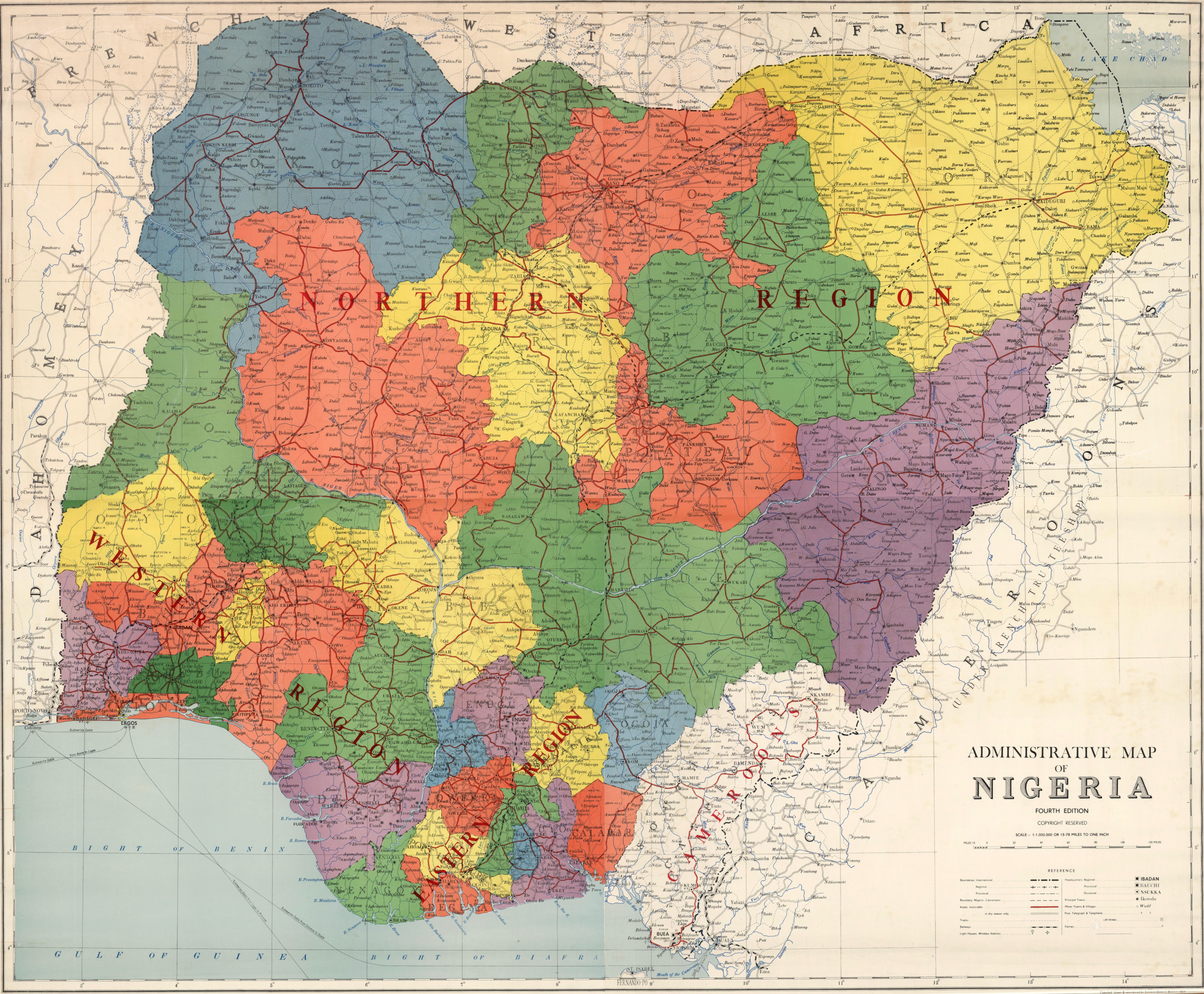
Map showing the regions and provinces of Nigeria in 1924

British colonialism created Nigeria, joining diverse peoples and regions in an artificial political entity along the Niger River. The nationalism that became a political factor in Nigeria during the interwar period derived both from an older political particularism and broad pan-Africanism, rather than from any sense among the people of a common Nigerian nationality. The goal of activists initially was not self-determination, but increased participation on a regional level in the governmental process.

Inconsistencies in British policy reinforced existing cleavages based on regional animosities, as the British tried both to preserve the indigenous cultures of each area and to introduce modern technology, and Western political and social concepts. In the north, appeals to Islamic legitimacy upheld the rule of the emirs, so that nationalist sentiments were related to Islamic ideals. Modern nationalists in the south, whose thinking was shaped by European ideas, opposed indirect rule, as they believed that it had strengthened what they considered an anachronistic ruling class and shut out the emerging Westernised elite.

The southern nationalists were inspired by a variety of sources, including such prominent American-based activists as Marcus Garvey and W.E.B. Du Bois. Nigerian students abroad, particularly at British schools, joined those from other colonies in pan-African groups such as the West African Students Union, founded in London in 1925. Early nationalists tended to ignore Nigeria as the focus of patriotism. Their common denominators tended to be based on newly assertive ethnic consciousness, particularly that of the Yoruba and Igbo. Despite the acceptance of European and North American influences, the nationalists were critical of colonialism for its failure to appreciate the antiquity, richness, and complexity of indigenous cultures. They wanted self-government, charging that only colonial rule prevented the unshackling of progressive forces in Nigeria and other states.

Political opposition to colonial rule often assumed religious dimensions. Independent Christian churches had emerged at the end of the nineteenth century. European interpretations of Christian orthodoxy in some cases refused to allow the incorporation of local customs and practices, although the various mission denominations interpreted Christianity in different ways. Most Europeans tended to overlook their own differences and were surprised and shocked that Nigerians wanted to develop new denominations independent of European control. Protestant sects had flourished in Christianity since the Protestant Reformation; the emergence of independent Christian churches in Nigeria (as of black denominations in the United States) was another phase of this history. The pulpits of the independent congregations became avenues for the free expression of critics of colonial rule.

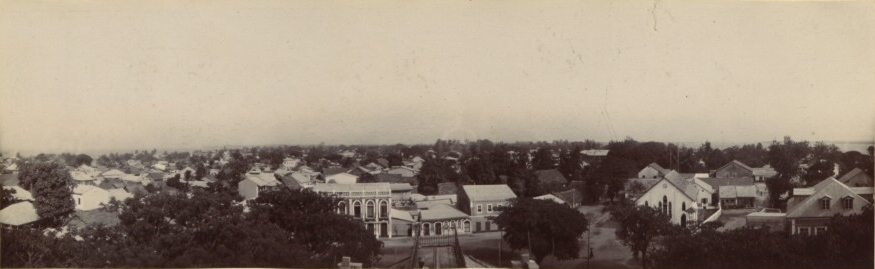
Colonial Lagos circa 1910

In the 1920s, Nigerians began to form a variety of associations, such as professional and business associations, like the Nigerian Union of Teachers; the Nigerian Law Association, which brought together lawyers, many of whom had been educated in Britain; and the Nigerian Produce Traders' Association, led by Obafemi Awolowo. While initially organised for professional and fraternal reasons, these were centres of educated people who had chances to develop their leadership skills in the organisations, as well as form broad social networks.

Ethnic and kinship organisations that often took the form of a tribal union also emerged in the 1920s. These organisations were primarily urban phenomena that arose after numerous rural migrants moved to the cities. Alienated by the anonymity of the urban environment and drawn together by ties to their ethnic homelands—as well as by the need for mutual aid—the new city dwellers formed local clubs that later expanded into federations covering whole regions. By the mid-1940s, the major ethnic groups had formed such associations as the Igbo Federal Union and the Egbe Omo Oduduwa (Society of the Descendants of Oduduwa), a Yoruba cultural movement, in which Awolowo played a leading role. In some cases, British assignment of people to ethnic groups, and treatment based along ethnic lines, led to identification with ethnicity where none had existed before.

A third type of organisation that was more pointedly political was the youth or student group, which became the vehicle of intellectuals and professionals. They were the most politically conscious segment of the population and created the vanguard of the nationalist movement. Newspapers, some of which were published before World War I, provided coverage of nationalist views.

The 1922 constitution provided Nigerians with the chance to elect a handful of representatives to the Legislative Council. The principal figure in the political activity that ensued was Herbert Macauley, often referred to as the father of Nigerian nationalism. He aroused political awareness through his newspaper, the Lagos Daily News. He also led the Nigerian National Democratic Party, which dominated elections in Lagos from its founding in 1922 until the ascendancy of the National Youth Movement in 1938. His political platform called for economic and educational development, Africanization of the civil service, and self-government for Lagos. Significantly, Macauley's NNDP remained almost entirely a Lagos party, popular only in the area whose people already had experience in elective politics.

The National Youth Movement used nationalist rhetoric to agitate for improvements in education. The movement brought to public notice a long list of future leaders, including H.O. Davies and Nnamdi Azikiwe. Although Azikiwe later came to be recognised as the leading spokesman for national unity, when he first returned from university training in the United States, his outlook was pan-African rather than nationalist, and emphasised the common African struggle against European colonialism (this was also reflective of growing pan-Africanism among American activists of the time). Azikiwe had less interest in purely Nigerian goals than did Davies, a student of Harold Laski at the London School of Economics, whose political orientation was considered left-wing.

By 1938, the NYM was agitating for dominion status within the British Commonwealth of Nations so that Nigeria would have the same status as Canada and Australia. In elections that year, the NYM ended the domination of the NNDP in the Legislative Council and worked to establish a national network of affiliates. Three years later, internal divisions arose that were dominated by major ethnic loyalties. The departure of Azikiwe and other Igbo members of the NYM left the organisation in Yoruba hands. During World War II, Awolowo reorganized it as a predominantly Yoruba political party, the Action Group. The Yoruba-Igbo rivalry became increasingly important in Nigerian politics.

=== Second World War ===
During World War II, three battalions of the Nigeria Regiment fought against Fascist Italy in the Ethiopian campaign. Nigerian units also contributed to two divisions serving with British forces in Palestine, Morocco, Sicily and Burma, where they won many honours. Wartime experiences provided a new frame of reference for many soldiers, who interacted across ethnic boundaries in ways that were unusual in Nigeria. The war also made the British reappraise Nigeria's political future. The war years brought a polarization between the older, more parochial leaders inclined toward gradualism and the younger intellectuals, who thought in more immediate terms.

The rapid growth of organised labour in the 1940s also brought new political forces into play. During the war, union membership increased sixfold to 30,000. The proliferation of labour organisations fragmented the movement, and potential leaders lacked the experience and skill to draw workers together.

The Action Group was largely the creation of Chief Obafemi Awolowo, General Secretary of Egbe Omo Oduduwa and leader of the Nigerian Produce Traders' Association. The Action Group was thus the heir of a generation of flourishing cultural consciousness among the Yoruba and also had valuable connections with commercial interests that were representative of the comparative economic advancement of the Western Region. Awolowo had little difficulty in appealing to broad segments of the Yoruba population, but he worked to avoid the Action Group from being stigmatized as a "tribal" group. Despite his somewhat successful efforts to enlist non-Yoruba support, the regionalist sentiment that had stimulated the party initially continued.

Segments of the Yoruba community had their own animosities and new rivalries arose. For example, many people in Ibadan opposed Awolowo on personal grounds because of his identification with the Ijebu Yoruba. Despite these difficulties, the Action Group rapidly built an effective organisation. Its program reflected greater planning and was more ideologically oriented than that of the National Council of Nigeria and the Cameroons. Although lacking Azikiwe's compelling personality, Awolowo was a formidable debater as well as a vigorous and tenacious political campaigner. He used for the first time in Nigeria modern, sometimes flamboyant, electioneering techniques. Among his leading lieutenants were Samuel Akintola of Ogbomoso and the Oni of Ife, the most important of the Yoruba monarchs.

The Action Group consistently supported minority-group demands for autonomous states within a federal structure, as well as the severance of a midwest state from the Western Region. It assumed that comparable alterations would be made elsewhere, an attitude that won the party minority voting support in the other regions. It backed Yoruba irredentism in the Fulani-ruled emirate of Ilorin in the Northern Region, and separatist movements among non-Igbo in the Eastern Region.

The Northern People's Congress (NPC) was organised in the late 1940s by a small group of Western-educated Northern Nigerians. They had obtained the assent of the emirs to form a political party to counterbalance the activities of the southern-based parties. It represented a substantial element of reformism in the North. The most powerful figure in the party was Ahmadu Bello, the Sardauna of Sokoto.

Bello wanted to protect northern social and political institutions from southern influence. He insisted on maintaining the territorial integrity of the Northern Region. He was prepared to introduce educational and economic changes to strengthen the north. Although his own ambitions were limited to the Northern Region, Bello backed the NPC's successful efforts to mobilize the north's large voting strength so as to win control of the national government.

The NPC platform emphasized the integrity of the north, its traditions, religion and social order. Support for broad Nigerian concerns occupied a clear second place. A lack of interest in extending the NPC beyond the Northern Region corresponded to this strictly regional orientation. Its activist membership was drawn from local government and emirate officials who had access to means of communication and to repressive traditional authority that could keep the opposition in line.

The small contingent of northerners who had been educated abroad—a group that included Abubakar Tafawa Balewa and Aminu Kano—was allied with British-backed efforts to introduce gradual change to the emirates. The emirs gave support to limited modernization largely from fears of the unsettling presence of southerners in the north, and by observing the improvements in living conditions in the South. Northern leaders committed to modernization were also firmly connected to the traditional power structure. Most internal problems were concealed, and open opposition to the domination of the Muslim aristocracy was not tolerated. Critics, including representatives of the Middle Belt who resented Muslim domination, were relegated to small, peripheral parties or to inconsequential separatist movements.

In 1950 Aminu Kano, who had been instrumental in founding the NPC, broke away to form the Northern Elements Progressive Union (NEPU), in protest against the NPC's limited objectives and what he regarded as a vain hope that traditional rulers would accept modernization. NEPU formed a parliamentary alliance with the National Council of Nigeria and the Cameroons (NCNC).

The NPC continued to represent the interests of the traditional order in the pre-independence deliberations. After the defection of Kano, the only significant disagreement within the NPC was related to moderates. Men such as Balewa believed that only by overcoming political and economic backwardness could the NPC protect the foundations of traditional northern authority against the influence of the more advanced south.

In all three regions, minority parties represented the special interests of ethnic groups, especially as they were affected by the majority. They were never able to elect sizeable legislative delegations, but they served as a means of public expression for minority concerns. They received attention from major parties before the elections, at which time either a dominant party from another region or the opposition party in their region sought their alliance.

The political parties jockeyed for positions of power in anticipation of the independence of Nigeria. Three constitutions were enacted from 1946 to 1954. While each generated considerable political controversy, they moved the country toward greater internal autonomy, with an increasing role for the political parties. The trend was toward the establishment of a parliamentary system of government, with regional assemblies and a federal House of Representatives.

In 1946 a new constitution was approved by the British Parliament at Westminster and promulgated in Nigeria. Although it reserved effective power in the hands of the Governor-General and his appointed Executive Council, the so-called Richards Constitution (after Governor-General Sir Arthur Richards, who was responsible for its formulation) provided for an expanded Legislative Council empowered to deliberate on matters affecting the whole country. Separate legislative bodies, the houses of assembly, were established in each of the three regions to consider local questions and to advise the Lieutenant Governors. The introduction of the federal principle, with deliberative authority devolved on the regions, signalled recognition of the country's diversity. Although realistic in its assessment of the situation in Nigeria, the Richards Constitution undoubtedly intensified regionalism as an alternative to political unification.

The pace of constitutional change accelerated after the promulgation of the Richards Constitution. It was suspended in 1950 against a call for greater autonomy, which resulted in an inter-parliamentary conference at Ibadan in 1950. The conference drafted the terms of a new constitution. The so-called Macpherson Constitution, after the incumbent Governor-General John Stuart Macpherson, went into effect the following year.

The most important innovations in the new charter reinforced the dual course of constitutional evolution, allowing for both regional autonomy and federal union. By extending the elective principle and by providing for a central government with a Council of Ministers, the Macpherson Constitution gave renewed impetus to party activity and to political participation at the national level. But by providing for comparable regional governments exercising broad legislative powers, which could not be overridden by the newly established 185-seat federal House of Representatives, the Macpherson Constitution also gave a significant boost to regionalism. Subsequent revisions contained in the Lyttleton Constitution, enacted in 1954, firmly established the federal principle and paved the way for independence.

=== Self-governing regions (1957) ===
In 1957, the Western and the Eastern regions became formally self-governing under the parliamentary system. Similar status was acquired by the Northern Region two years later. There were numerous differences of detail among the regional systems, but all adhered to parliamentary forms and were equally autonomous in relation to the Nigerian federal government at Lagos. The federal government retained specified powers, including responsibility for banking, currency, external affairs, defence, shipping and navigation and communications, but real political power was centred in the regions. Significantly, the regional governments controlled public expenditures derived from revenues raised within each region.

Ethnic cleavages intensified in the 1950s. Political activists in the southern areas spoke of self-government in terms of educational opportunities and economic development. Because of the spread of mission schools and wealth derived from export crops, the southern parties were committed to policies that would benefit the south of the country. In the north, the emirs intended to maintain firm control on economic and political change.

Any activity in the north that might include participation by the federal government (and consequently by southern civil servants) was regarded as a challenge to the primacy of the emirates. Broadening political participation and expanding educational opportunities and other social services also were viewed as threats to the status quo. An extensive immigrant population of southerners, especially Igbo, already were living in the north; they dominated clerical positions and were active in many trades.

The cleavage between the Yoruba and the Igbo was accentuated by their competition for control of the political machinery. The receding British presence enabled local officials and politicians to gain access to patronage over government jobs, funds for local development, market permits, trade licenses, government contracts, and even scholarships for higher education. In an economy with many qualified applicants for every post, great resentment was generated by any favouritism that authorities showed to members of their own ethnic group.

In the immediate post-World War II period, Nigeria benefited from a favourable trade balance. Although per capita income in the country as a whole remained low by international standards, rising incomes among salaried personnel and burgeoning urbanization expanded consumer demand for imported goods.

In the meantime, public sector spending increased even more dramatically than export earnings. It was supported not only by the income from huge agricultural surpluses but also by a new range of direct and indirect taxes imposed during the 1950s. The transfer of responsibility for budgetary management from the central to the regional governments in 1954 accelerated the pace of public spending on services and on development projects. Total revenues of central and regional governments nearly doubled in relation to the gross domestic product during the decade.

The most dramatic event having a long-term effect on Nigeria's economic development was the discovery and exploitation of petroleum deposits. The search for oil, begun in 1908 and abandoned a few years later, was revived in 1937 by Shell and British Petroleum. Exploration was intensified in 1946, but the first commercial discovery did not occur until 1956, at Olobiri in the Niger Delta. In 1958 exportation of Nigerian oil was initiated at facilities constructed at Port Harcourt. Oil income was still marginal, but the prospects for continued economic expansion appeared bright and accentuated political rivalries on the eve of independence.

The election of the House of Representatives after the adoption of the 1954 constitution gave the NPC a total of seventy-nine seats, all from the Northern Region. Among the other major parties, the NCNC took fifty-six seats, winning a majority in both the Eastern and the Western regions, while the Action Group captured only twenty-seven seats. The NPC was called on to form a government, but the NCNC received six of the ten ministerial posts. Three of these posts were assigned to representatives from each region, and one was reserved for a delegate from the Northern Cameroons.

As a further step toward independence, the Governor's Executive Council was merged with the Council of Ministers in 1957 to form the all-Nigerian Federal Executive Council. The NPC federal parliamentary leader, Abubakar Tafawa Balewa, was appointed Prime Minister of Nigeria. Balewa formed a coalition government that included the Action Group as well as the NCNC to prepare the country for the final British withdrawal. His government guided the country for the next three years, operating with almost complete autonomy in internal affairs.

=== Constitutional conferences in the UK (1957–58) ===
The preparation of a new federal constitution for an independent Nigeria was carried out at conferences held at Lancaster House in London in 1957 and 1958, which were presided over by The Rt. Hon. Alan Lennox-Boyd, M.P., the British Secretary of State for the Colonies. Nigerian delegates were selected to represent each region and to reflect various shades of opinion. The delegation was led by Balewa of the NPC and included party leaders Awolowo of the Action Group, Azikiwe of the NCNC, and Bello of the NPC; they were also the premiers of the Western, Eastern and Northern regions, respectively. Independence was achieved on 1 October 1960.

Elections were held for a new and greatly enlarged House of Representatives in December 1959; 174 of the 312 seats were allocated to the Northern Region on the basis of its larger population. The NPC, entering candidates only in the Northern Region, confined campaigning largely to local issues but opposed the addition of new regimes. The NCNC backed creation of a midwest state and proposed federal control of education and health services.

The Action Group, which staged a lively campaign, favoured stronger government and the establishment of three new states while advocating the creation of a West Africa Federation that would unite Nigeria with Ghana and Sierra Leone. The NPC captured 142 seats in the new legislature. Balewa was called on to head an NPC-NCNC coalition government, and Awolowo became the official leader of the opposition.

== Independent Nigeria (1960) ==
By a British Act of Parliament, Nigeria became independent on 1 October 1960. Azikiwe was installed as Governor-General of the federation and Balewa continued to serve as head of a democratically elected parliamentary, but now completely sovereign, government. The Governor-General represented the British monarch as head of state and was appointed by the Crown on the advice of the Nigerian prime minister in consultation with the regional premiers. The Governor-General, in turn, was responsible for appointing the prime minister and for choosing a candidate from among contending leaders when there was no parliamentary majority. Otherwise, the Governor-General's office was essentially ceremonial.

The government was responsible to a Parliament composed of the popularly elected 312-member House of Representatives and the 44-member Senate, chosen by the regional legislatures.

In general, the regional constitutions followed the federal model, both structurally and functionally. The most striking departure was in the Northern Region, where special provisions brought the regional constitution into consonance with Islamic law and custom. The similarity between the federal and regional constitutions was deceptive, however, and the conduct of public affairs reflected wide differences among the regions.

In February 1961, a plebiscite was conducted to determine the disposition of the Southern Cameroons and Northern Cameroons, which were administered by Britain as United Nations Trust Territories. By an overwhelming majority, voters in the Southern Cameroons opted to join formerly French-administered Cameroon over integration with Nigeria as a separate federated region. In the Northern Cameroons, however, the largely Muslim electorate chose to merge with Nigeria's Northern Region.

== See also ==
- British West Africa
- Enclaves of Forcados and Badjibo
- Bandele Omoniyi
