= Omoniyi =

- Gender: Male
- Language: Yoruba

Origin
- Origin: Nigeria
- Meaning: The child has honour
- Region of origin: South West, Nigeria

Omoniyi is a Nigerian male given name and surname of Yoruba origin, which means "The child is honour" or "The child has honour/worth/value".

== Given name ==
- Omoniyi Caleb Olubolade (born 1964), Nigerian politician and military officer
- Omoniyi Temidayo Raphael (born 1994), Nigerian rapper and singer

== Surname ==
- Bandele Omoniyi (1884–1913), Nigerian nationalist
- Folashade Omoniyi (born 1968), Nigerian public servant
- Shade Omoniyi (born 1971), Nigerian actress
