= Folashade =

Folashade is a given name. Notable people with the name include:

- Folashade Adefisayo, Nigerian academic
- Folashade Abugan (born 1990), Nigerian sprinter
- Folashade Oluwafemiayo (born 1985), Nigerian athlete
- Folashade Okoya (born 1977), Nigerian businessperson
- Folashade Omoniyi (born 1968), Nigerian businessperson
- Folashade Sherifat Jaji (born 1957), Nigerian civil servant
- Folashade Yemi-Esan (born 1964), Nigerian civil servant
- Grace Folashade Bent (born 1960), Nigerian politician
