= Kwara State Internal Revenue Service =

Nigerian state tax collection agency

The Kwara State Internal Revenue Service (KWIRS), is the sole agency in charge of collecting taxes and all other forms of internally generated revenue for the Kwara State Government with headquarters in Ilorin, Kwara State, Nigeria and area offices in all 16 local governments in Kwara State.

Established on June 22, 2015, when the Kwara State Revenue Administration Law, 2015 (Law No.6 of 2015) was passed, the service took over the responsibility of tax administration from the old Kwara State Board of Internal Revenue which immediately became defunct.

In September 2018, the Kwara State Internal Revenue Service became the first revenue service (IRS) in Nigeria to achieve two ISO certifications and the first state internal revenue service (SIRS) to achieve any ISO certification at all. The service got certified in ISO 9001: 2015 Quality Management System and ISO/IEC 22301: 2012 Business Continuity Management System.

The service is currently under the leadership of Shade Omoniyi who was appointed as Executive Chairman on October 1, 2019. She is part of a cabinet which comprises over 50% women, appointed by Kwara State Governor AbdulRahman AbdulRasaq.
