= Samuel Segun Okoya =

Nigerian academic in applied mathematics

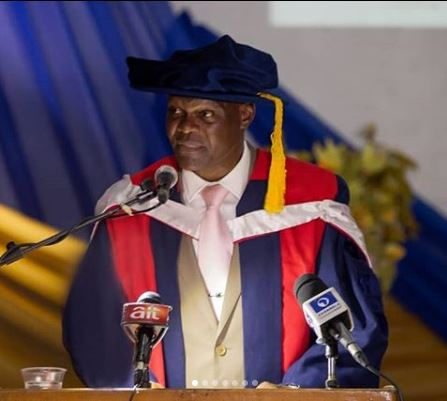
- Born: 20 October 1958 (age 67), Zaria, Kaduna State
- Education: Mathematics
- Alma mater: Obafemi Awolowo University
- Occupation: Professor
- Years active: 1989–present
- Known for: Editor-in-chief, Journal and Notices of the Nigerian Mathematical Society; firstPastor E.A Adeboye Outstanding Professor of Mathematics, (Endowed Professorial Chair) University of Lagos.
- Spouse: Aderonke A. Okoya (Nee Olubakin)
- Children: 3
- Relatives: Razaq Okoya

Samuel Segun Okoya (born 20 October 1958, in Zaria, Kaduna State, Nigeria) is an academic in applied mathematics at Obafemi Awolowo University. He is the editor-in-chief of the Journal and Notices of the Nigerian Mathematical Society and the First Occupier of Pastor E.A Adeboye Outstanding Professor of Mathematics (Endowed Professorial Chair) University of Lagos. He is the alumnus to attain the position of professor and head of the Mathematics Department at Obafemi Awolowo University.

== Education ==
Okoya had his entire tertiary education at Obafemi Awolowo University. He graduated with his bachelor's degree in 1983, earned his master's degree in 1986 and Ph.D. in 1989. His PhD dissertation, supervised by Reuben O. Ayeni, was titled "A Mathematical Model for Explosions with Chain Branching and Chain Breaking Kinetics". He is a Fellow of the Mathematical Association of Nigeria and Nigerian Mathematical Society. He regularly visits the Abdus Salam International Centre for Theoretical Physics, The World Academy of Sciences and International Mathematical Union.
