= Lagos Daily News =

Nigerian daily English newspaper

- Type: Daily newspaper
- Founded: 1925 in British West Africa
- Language: English

The Lagos Daily News is a Nigerian newspaper founded in 1925 that was the first daily newspaper in British West Africa. It was bought by Herbert Macaulay and John Akinlade Caulcrick in 1927. The paper was politically aligned with Macaulay's Nigerian National Democratic Party. It was part of the internal factors that led to the rise and growth of nationalism in Nigeria during the colonial period which led to the decolonization process.
