= Shade Okoya =

Nigerian businesswoman (born 1977)

Shade Okoya MON
- Born: 25 April 1977 (age 49); Lagos State, Nigeria
- Occupation: Businesswoman
- Title: Managing Director of Eleganza Industrial City
- Spouse: Rasaq Okoya (m. 1999)
- Children: 4
- Website: www.shadeokoya.com.ng

Folashade Nimota Okoya MON (born 25 April 1977) is a Nigerian industrialist, businesswoman and fashion commentator. She is the MD/CEO of Eleganza Group, a leading conglomerate in Nigeria's manufacturing industry, founded by her husband, the billionaire industrialist and Aare of Lagos, Chief Razaq Okoya.

== Early life and education ==
Okoya was born on 25 April 1977 to the family of Alhaji Tajudeen Adeleye and Alhaja Nimota Adeleye in Lagos State. She is Yoruba, a Muslim and hails from Ijebu Ode, Ogun State. Okoya is an alumna of Lagos State Polytechnic, where she obtained her National Diploma certificate in Banking and Finance before obtaining a Bachelor of Science degree in Sociology from the University of Lagos.

== Personal life ==
In May 1999, she married Razaq Okoya at the age of 22, while he was 59 years old. The couple resides in Lagos, Nigeria with their four children, Olamide, Subomi, Oyinlola and Wahab.

== Charities and philanthropic interests ==
Okoya is the sponsor of the Folashade Okoya Kids Cup, which held its maiden edition in December 2014 in partnership with the Lagos State Grassroots Soccer Association to celebrate kids at Christmas. She also sponsors 10 students yearly into Higher Institutions via a scholarship scheme and organizes yearly pilgrimage for Muslims to visit the holy land.

== Awards and recognition ==
On 23 August 2014, the European American University awarded Okoya an Honorary Doctorate degree in Business Management and Corporate Leadership. On 11 December 2014, Okoya was awarded the Business Executive of the Year 2014 by the International Centre for Corporate Leadership for Africans and Blacks in Diaspora. She also won the Inspiring Executive Woman of the Year Award in July 2018.
