= Razaq Okoya =

Nigerian industrialist (born 1940)

Chief Razaq Okoya CON
- Born: Razaq Okoya; 12 January 1940 (age 86); Lagos, Nigeria
- Occupations: industrialist, chairman of the Eleganza Group and the RAO Property Investment Company
- Spouses: Alhaja Kuburat Okoya; Dr. Shade Okoya
- Children: Tayo Okoya; Jubril Okoya; Aminat Okoya; Subomi Okoya; Wahab Okoya; Olamide Okoya; Oyinlola Okoya
- Parents: Idiatu Okoya; Tiamiyu Ayinde Okoya
- Relatives: Wosilat Okoya (sister)
- Website: www.eleganzagroups.com

Razaq Akanni OkoyaRazaq_Akanni_Okoya.wav CON (born 12 January 1940) is a Nigerian industrialist and the Aare of Lagos. He is the owner and founder of Eleganza group of companies.

== Early life ==
Okoya is a Yoruba man from the southwestern part of Nigeria. He was born into the family of Tiamiyu Ayinde Okoya in Lagos. He attended Ansar-Un-Deen primary school in Oke Popo, his only formal schooling. He worked in his father's tailoring business, which also included the sale of tailoring accessories. The experience he got gave him the confidence to start tailoring activities on his own. He saved every penny he made until he had 20 pounds. His mother gave him the extra 50 pounds, and with the blessing of his father, he started importing and trading goods from Japan.

== Residence ==
His estate, "Oluwa ni shola" (The Lord bestows honor) at Lekki/Ajah Expressway is his primary residence. The "Oluwa ni shola" estate, also described as an expatriates estate because of the high number of expatriates living there, is equipped with uninterrupted power and water supply, and various amenities and decorations. According to Bellanaija, "the music video [for "Suddenly"] was shot on location at Okoya's "Oluwa ni shola" estate."
