= Bandele Omoniyi =

Nigerian nationalist (1884–1913)

Bandele Omoniyi (6 November 1884 – 1913) was a Nigerian nationalist who is best known for his book A Defence of the Ethiopian Movement (1908), which urged for political reforms in the colonies, warning that otherwise a revolution in Africa might end British rule. According to Hakim Adi, he is one of the earliest examples of the politically active West African student in Britain.

== Biography ==
Bandele Omoniyi was born in Lagos, in present-day Nigeria, and his parents sold their land to finance his studies in Britain, where Omoniyi first went in 1905. Enrolling at Edinburgh University in 1906 to study law, he eventually gave up his studies as he became increasingly involved in political activities, taking up anti-imperial journalism in socialist, Scottish and Nigerian publications. He wrote to various British politicians, including the Prime Minister, Henry Campbell-Bannerman, and the future Labour Party leader Ramsay MacDonald, demanding representation for Africans in the colonies. In 1907, Omoniyi criticised colonial rule in a series of letters to the Edinburgh Magazine. He also wrote articles for the West African press, and in 1908 published his major work, A Defence of the Ethiopian Movement, in Edinburgh, dedicating it "to The Right Honourable and Honourable Members of the British Parliament".

=== A Voice for Reform and Equality ===
In the early 20th century, amidst a backdrop of social upheaval and colonial resistance, Nigerian-born intellectual Bandele Omoniyi emerged as a significant figure advocating for social and political equality within the British Empire. His life and work illustrate the complexities of identity, imperialism, and the quest for reform during a period marked by significant challenges for African professionals.

=== A Context of Change ===
Omoniyi later moved to Brazil around 1910, where he was subsequently arrested for his political activities. He refused assistance from the British Consul. Imprisoned, he contracted beriberi and died, aged 28.
