= Folashade Omoniyi =

Nigerian public servant (born 1968)

Executive Chairman of the Kwara State Internal Revenue Service
- Incumbent
- Assumed office October 2019
- Governor: AbdulRahman AbdulRasaq

Personal details
- Born: March 26, 1968 (age 58) Kano, Nigeria
- Spouse: Biodun Omoniyi
- Education: St Clare's Girls Grammar School; University of Ilorin; Obafemi Awolowo University
- Occupation: I.T professional, public servant
- Website: www.shadeomoniyi.com

Folashade Omoniyi, also known as Shade Omoniyi (born March 26, 1968), is an I. T professional and the executive chair of the Kwara State Internal Revenue Service. She was previously MD/CEO of FBN Mortgages Limited, a subsidiary of First Bank of Nigeria.

== Early life and education ==
Omoniyi was born on 26 March 1968 in Kano State, Nigeria, where she received her early education before moving to Ilorin in 1976, while still in primary school, following her father’s transfer of services from Kano State to Kwara State. She entered secondary school in September 1977. She attended St Clare's Girls Grammar School in Offa, Nigeria. She is ethnic Yoruba and is the first child and only daughter of her parents.

She holds a Bachelor of Engineering (Honours) degree in Electrical Engineering from the University of Ilorin, where she was the only female student in her course of study. She subsequently earned a Master of Business Administration (MBA) from Obafemi Awolowo University, completed between 1999 and 2001.

Omoniyi has also attended executive education programmes at the Harvard Business School, Michigan Ross School, London Business School, Stanford Graduate School of Business, and Lagos Business School (SMP 18).

== Career ==
Omoniyi began her career as an engineer in the information technology industry between 1990 and 1997, working at Tara Systems in Lagos, where she described herself as a pioneer of early networking and IT projects. She then joined African International Bank (AIB) as Head of IT and Systems Administration.

In 2001, Omoniyi joined First Bank of Nigeria as Head of Networks and Communication Management, and subsequently moved from information technology into business development. Over the course of a 17-year career at the bank, she held progressively senior roles spanning business development, retail marketing, public sector banking — where she was responsible for First Bank's public sector business across Lagos State and federal agencies — and branch banking services, rising to Deputy General Manager and Group Head of Branch Banking Services.

In 2016, after fifteen years with the bank, Omoniyi was appointed Managing Director and Chief Executive Officer of FBN Mortgages Limited, First Bank’s mortgage subsidiary.

=== Executive Chairman, Kwara State Internal Revenue Service (2019–present) ===
On 1 October 2019, Omoniyi was appointed Executive Chairman of the Kwara State Internal Revenue Service (KW-IRS) by Governor AbdulRahman AbdulRazaq , a leader whose female appointees outnumbered his male appointees. She was the first woman to hold the position, and was, at the time, reported to be the only female executive chairman of a state internal revenue service in Nigeria.

On taking office, Omoniyi restructured the agency's management, reducing the number of direct reports to the Executive Chairman from approximately twenty-six to nine and reorganising several units into formal departments.

On 23 December 2022, under her leadership, the Kwara State Internal Revenue Service was recognised by the Kwara State Government as the Most Impactful Ministry, Department and Agency (MDA) in the state, one of several awards and recognitions received by the agency during her tenure.

Omoniyi was reappointed for a second and final term effective 3 October 2023. According to the announcement, internally generated revenue had become more efficient under her leadership through the deployment of new technology aimed at blocking leakages and easing revenue collection for the public.

=== Fiscal performance and recognition ===
Under Omoniyi's leadership, Kwara State's ranking in BudgIT's annual State of States Report, which measures subnational fiscal performance across Nigeria, rose from 10th place in 2021 to 4th in 2023 and 3rd in 2024. Speaking at the 2025 KW-IRS Tax Club Quiz Competition, Omoniyi cited the BudgIT 2025 report and stated that the state had recorded 36 per cent year-on-year growth in Internally Generated Revenue between 2023 and 2024, and that Kwara State had become the fifth least dependent state on federal allocations.

In March 2024, Omoniyi received the Long Service Award from the Joint Tax Board (JTB) at a ceremony held at the Transcorp Hilton, Abuja. The award recognises Executive Chairmen who have served more than one term and contributed to the advancement of tax and revenue administration in Nigeria. The citation noted her contribution to various JTB committees and her role in positioning [[Kwara State]] as a trendsetter in subnational revenue administration.

==== Community programmes ====
Under Omoniyi's leadership, KW-IRS introduced the 5-Es Community Impact Programme, structured around five pillars: Enterprise, Energy, Education, Empowerment, and Environment. The initiative includes the agency's annual Tax Club Quiz Competition, run in partnership with secondary schools across Kwara State to promote early tax awareness among students.

==== Presidential Committee on Fiscal Policy and Tax Reforms ====
Omoniyi serves as a member of the Presidential Committee on Fiscal Policy and Tax Reforms inaugurated by President Bola Tinubu in August 2023 and chaired by Taiwo Oyedele, who was later appointed Minister of Finance and Coordinating Minister of the Economy. The committee was mandated to redesign Nigeria's tax architecture and consolidate overlapping revenue agencies; its proposals were transmitted to the National Assembly in October 2024 and signed into law by President Tinubu in June 2025.

===== Professional memberships and certifications =====
Omoniyi is a Fellow of the Chartered Institute of Taxation of Nigeria (CITN) and an Honorary Senior Member of the Chartered Institute of Bankers of Nigeria (CIBN). She is also a member of the Nigerian Society of Engineers (NSE) and of the National Institute of Marketing of Nigeria (NIM).

She holds certifications as a Cisco Certified Network Professional (CCNP), Cisco Certified Network Associate (CCNA), and Microsoft Certified Systems Engineer(MCSE), credentials reflecting her early career in Information technology and banking infrastructure.

== Personal life ==
Omoniyi is married to Biodun Omoniyi, and they have children together.

In 2008, on her fortieth birthday, she funded the renovation of two classroom blocks at her former secondary school, St Clare’s Girls Grammar School in Offa, converting one into a computer centre equipped with eighteen computer systems, an air-conditioning unit, a generator, printers and servers; she was recognised for the gesture by the Kwara State Government.

She was the first president of the 1982 set of the school’s Old Girls Association and has continued to run programmes supporting young female students. In 2023, she and her husband renovated a block of classrooms at the Community School at Okeya-Ipo and installed over 60 computers with other gadgets for the use of the school.

These projects are among several philanthropic interventions attributed to her.
