= Old Essex House =

House in Barnes, London, England

Coordinates: 51.473171°N 0.248064°W

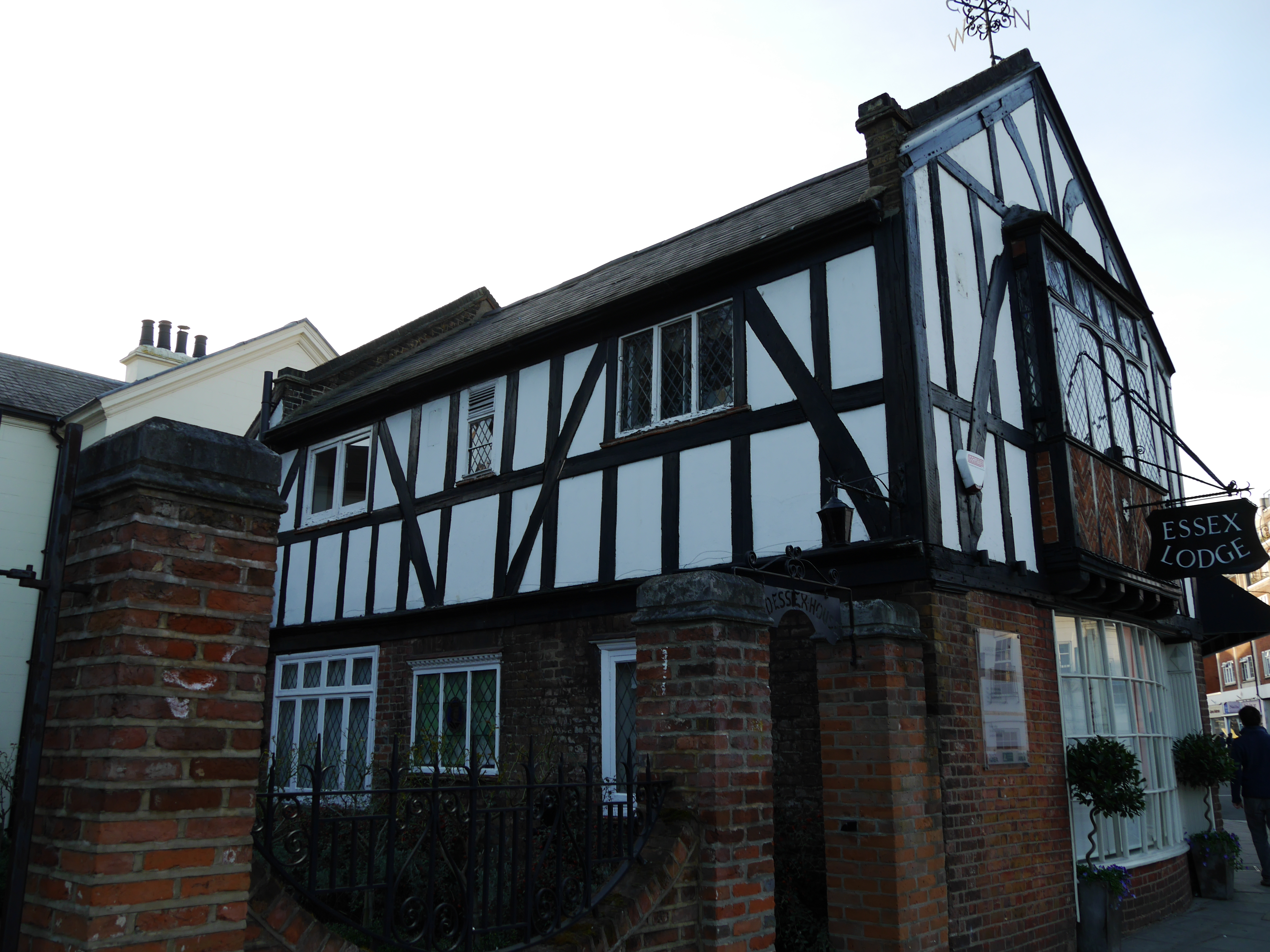
Old Essex House

Old Essex House is a Grade II listed house at Station Road, Barnes, London SW13 0LW. It faces onto Barnes Green and is located close to the junction with Barnes High Street and Church Road.

It has its origins in the late 16th/early 17th centuries. It is now a doctors' surgery.
