= Barnes High Street =

Street in London, England

Coordinates: 51.4736°N 0.2495°W

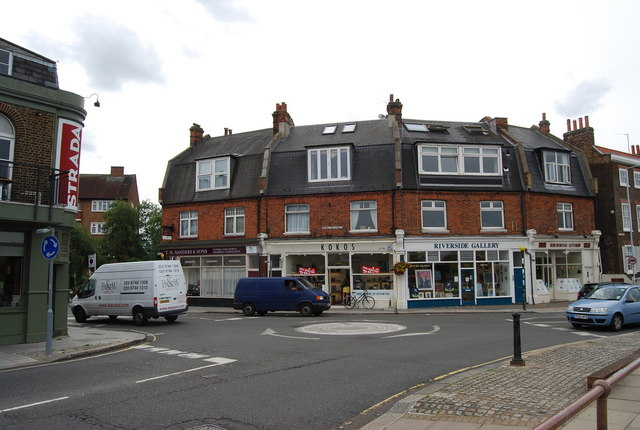
Northern end of the street where it meets The Terrace by the River Thames.

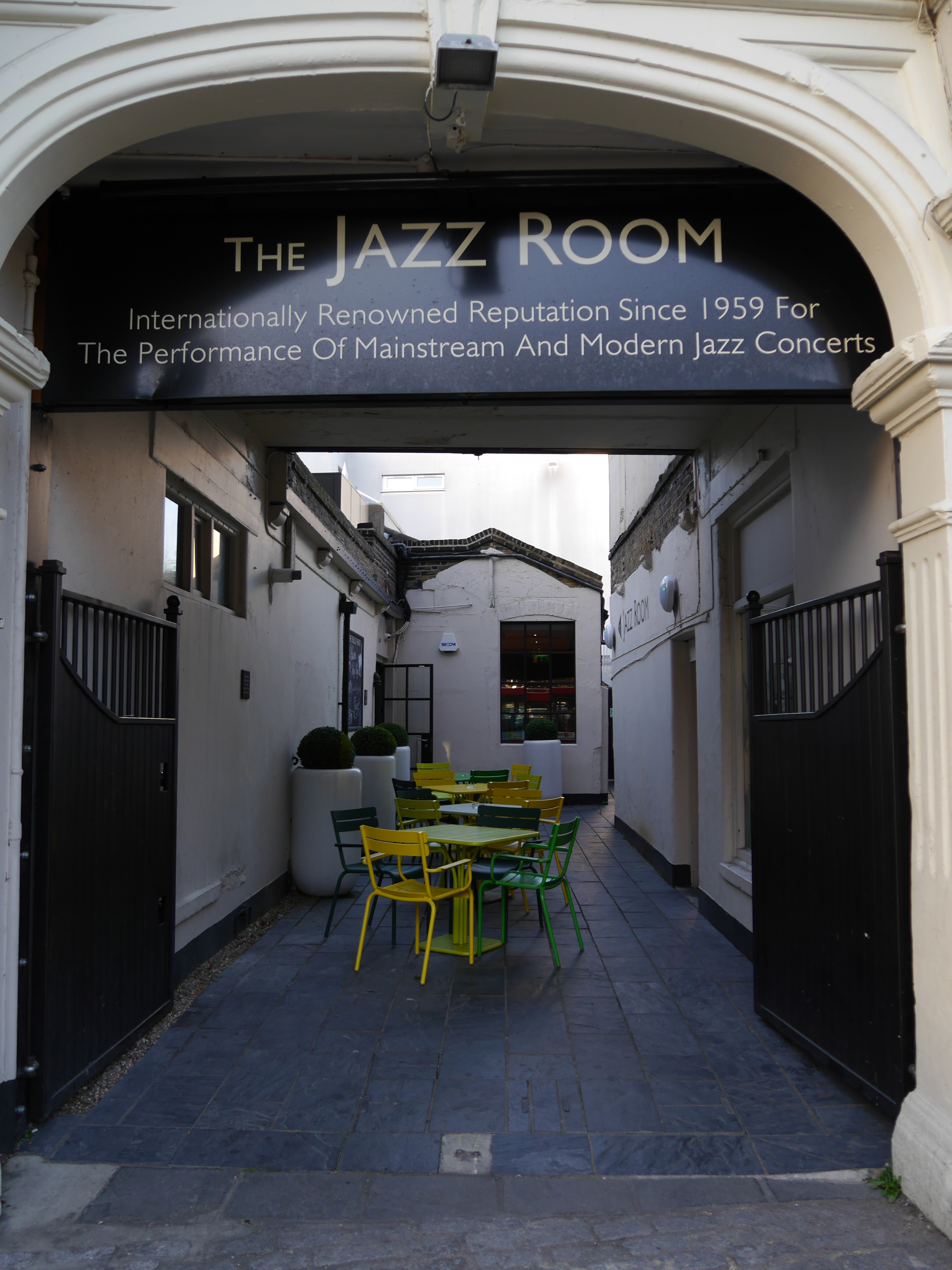
Entrance to The Bull's Head.

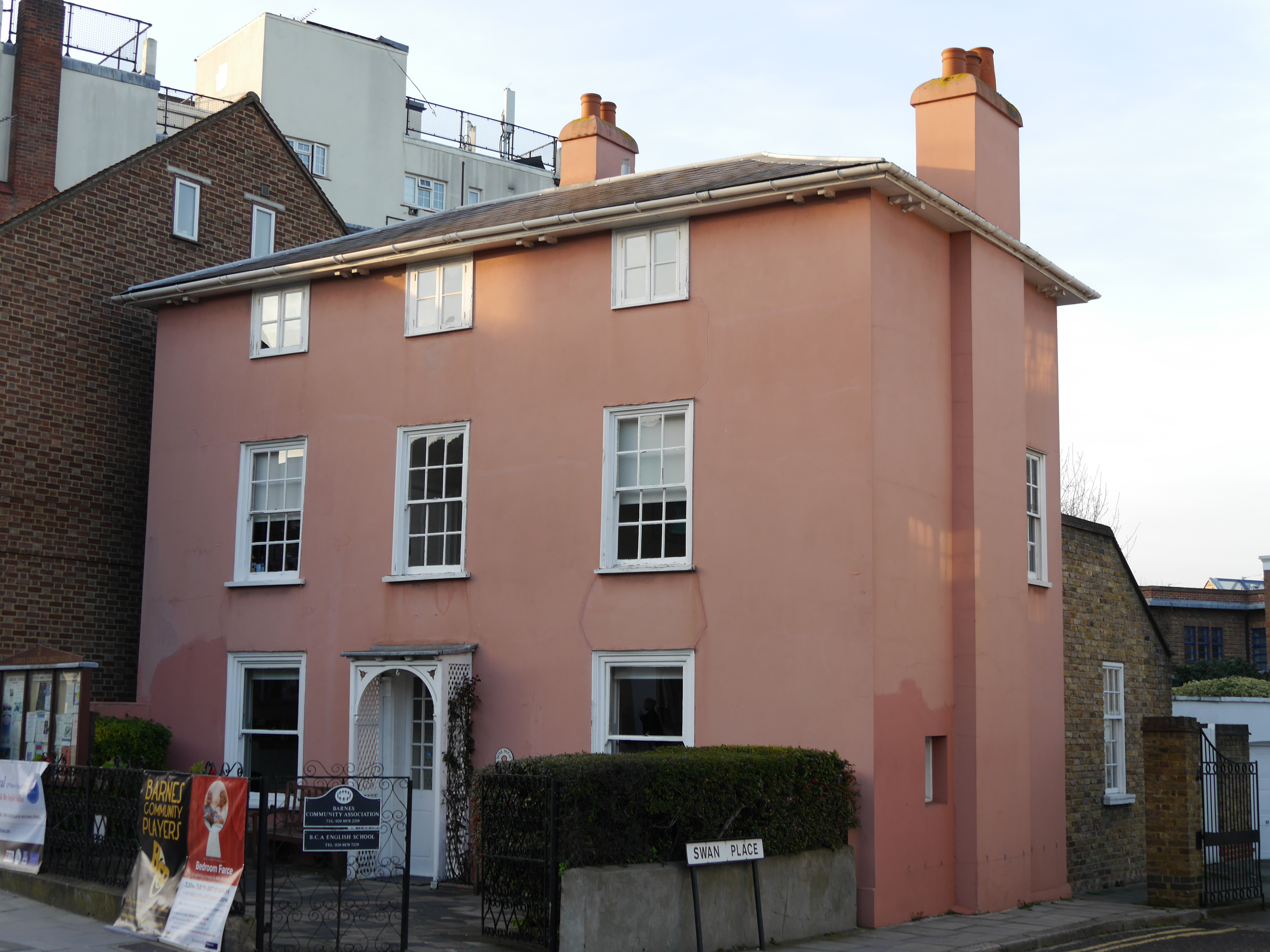
The Grade II listed Rose House at 70 Barnes High Street, located close to the southern end of the street by Barnes Green.

Barnes High Street is a road running through the centre of Barnes in England. It is located in the London Borough of Richmond upon Thames and is the high street of the suburb of Barnes featuring a number of commercial properties including shops and pubs. It is located a short distance from Barnes Bridge railway station.

It runs from The Terrace in the north by the River Thames to Barnes Green where it forks with one route Station Road heading on south towards Barnes railway station and on the other Church Road curving eastwards towards St Mary's Church and onwards in the general direction of Putney. Notable buildings include the Grade II listed Rose House, dating back to the seventeenth century and The Bull's Head pub, which gained fame as a music venue in the twentieth century. Another pub, the Coach and Horses, is located nearby. Old Essex House is located just to the south of the junction with Station Road. The street is referred to in the 1907 novel The City of Pleasure by Arnold Bennett.

== Bibliography ==
- Lang, Paul Howard. Richmond upon Thames Through Time. Amberley Publishing Limited, 2015.
- Pevsner, Nikolaus. London 2: South. Penguin, 1973.

Media related to Barnes High Street at Wikimedia Commons
