= Sun Inn, Barnes =

Pub in Barnes, London

Coordinates: 51.473629°N 0.24747086°W

The Sun Inn, Barnes
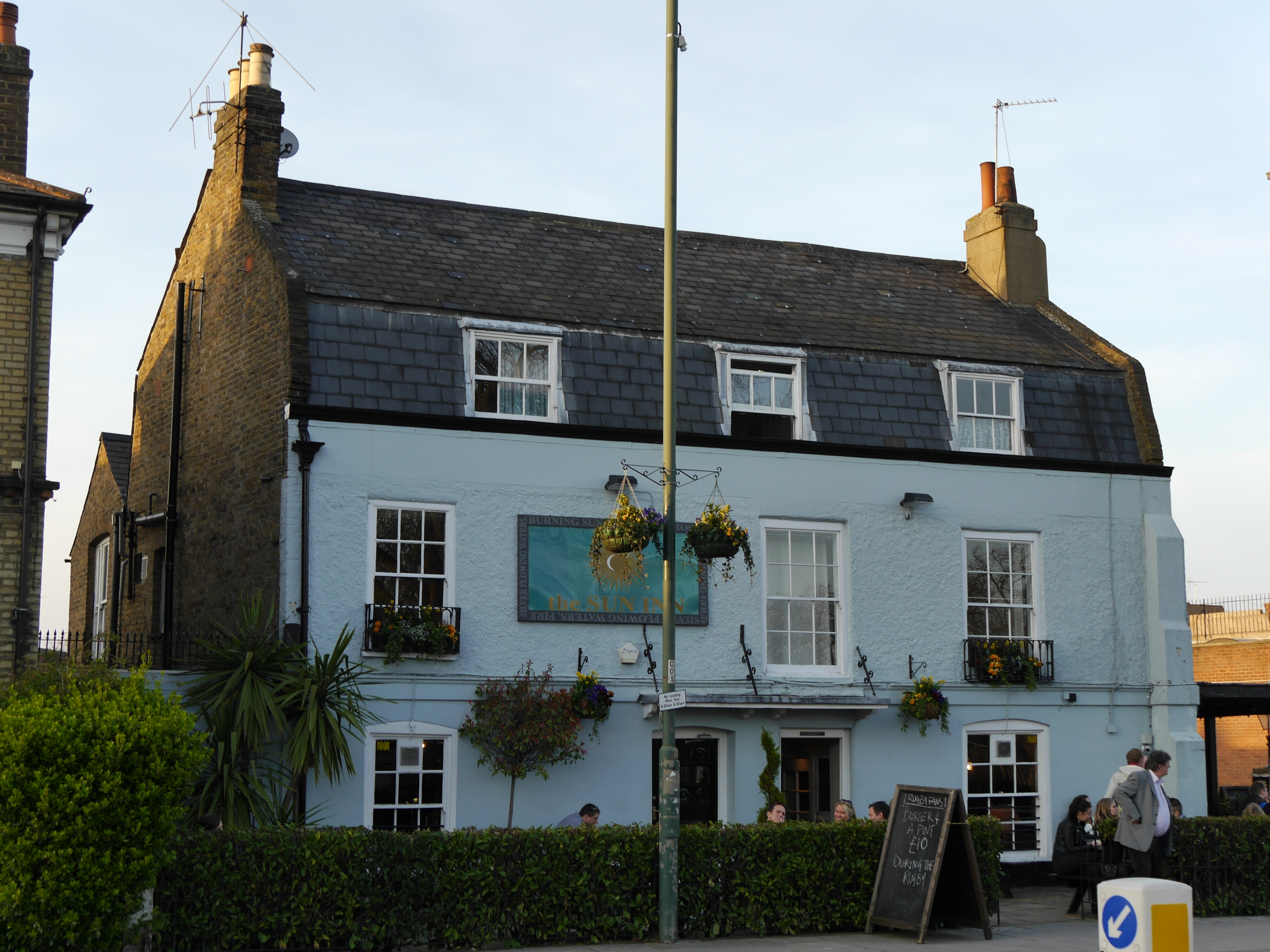
- The Sun Inn

- Location within London Borough of Richmond upon Thames

General information
- Type: Public house
- Location: 7 Church Road, Barnes; London SW13 9HE (London Borough of Richmond upon Thames)

Listed Building – Grade II
- Official name: Sun Inn, Church Road
- Designated: 25 June 1983
- Reference no.: 1261429

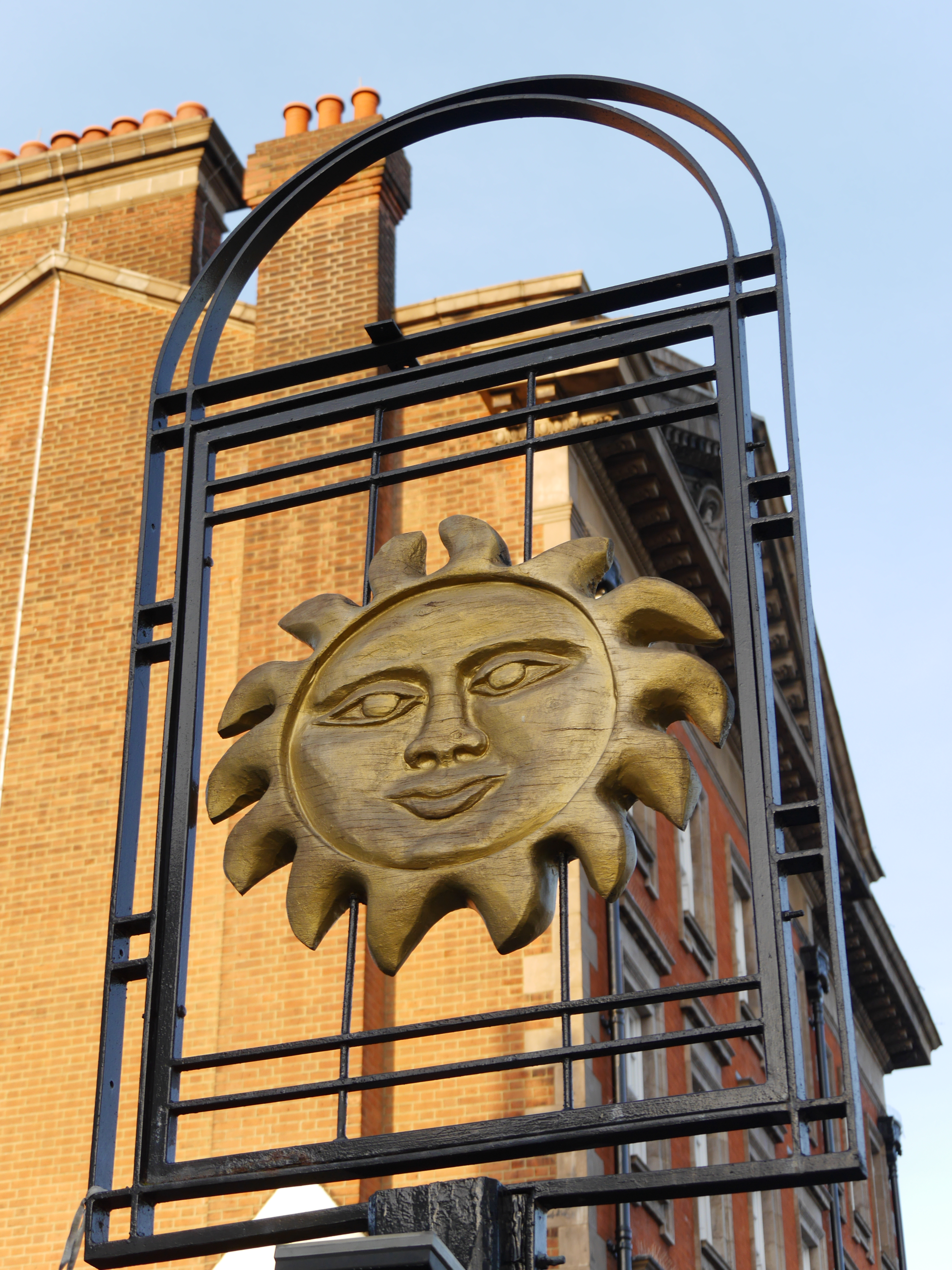
The pub's sign

The Sun Inn is a Grade II listed public house overlooking the village pond at 7 Church Road, Barnes in the London Borough of Richmond upon Thames. It was built as a coffee-house in the mid-18th century, but the architect is not known.

The Sun Inn is now part of the Mitchells & Butlers chain.
