= 70 Barnes High Street =

House in Barnes, London

Coordinates: 51.473593°N 0.248048°W

Rose House, 70 Barnes High Street
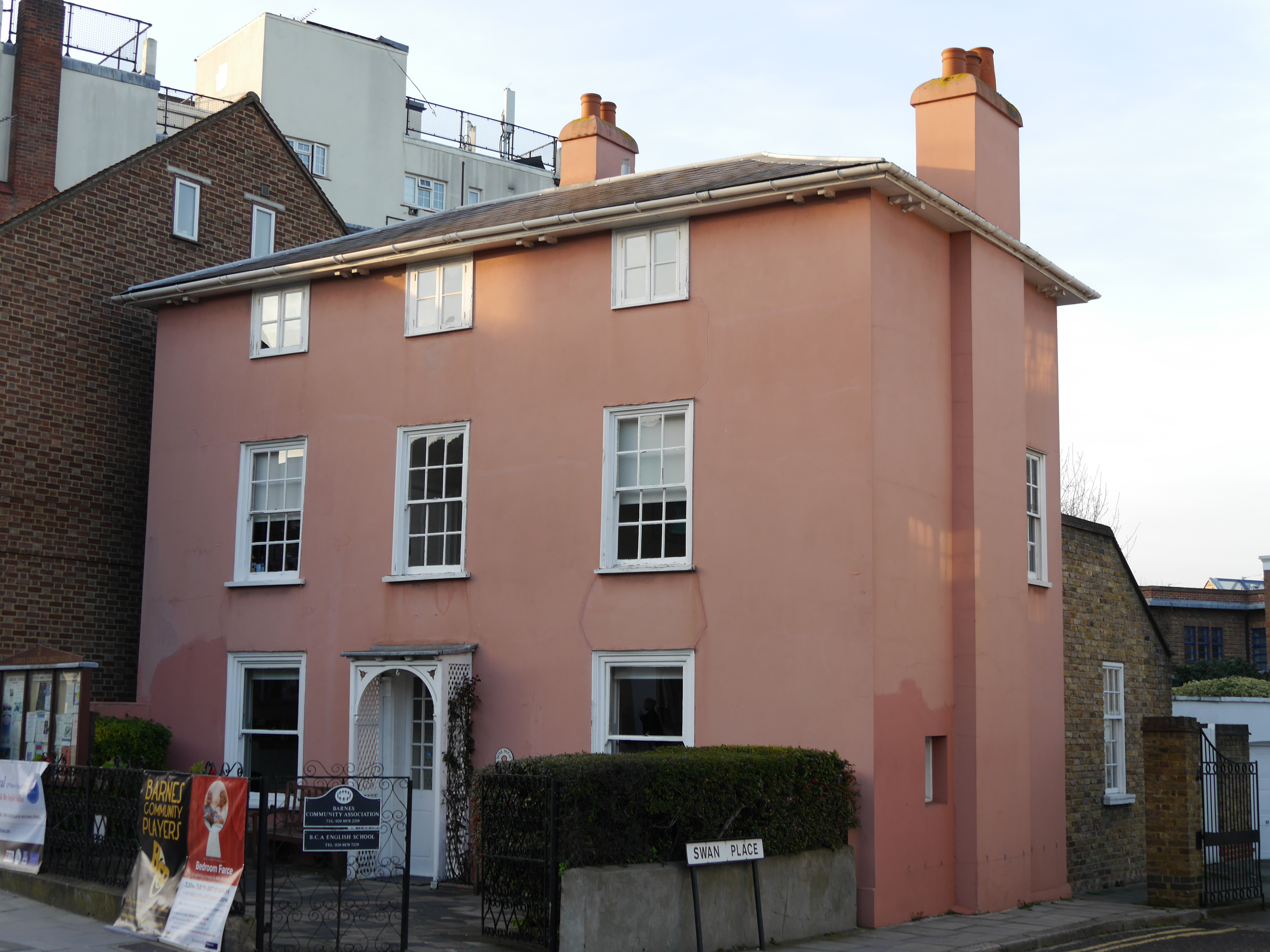
- 70 Barnes High Street, 2014
- Interactive map of the Rose House, 70 Barnes High Street area

General information
- Location: Barnes, Richmond upon Thames, London, England

Listed Building – Grade II
- Official name: 70 High Street, SW13
- Designated: 5 August 1974
- Reference no.: 1193550

70 Barnes High Street, also known as the Rose House, is a Grade II listed house located on Barnes High Street in Barnes, London SW13, which dates from the 17th century. It is now used by the Barnes Community Association as office accommodation.
