= Olympic Studios =

Recording studio in London, England

Coordinates: 51.4752°N 0.2407°W

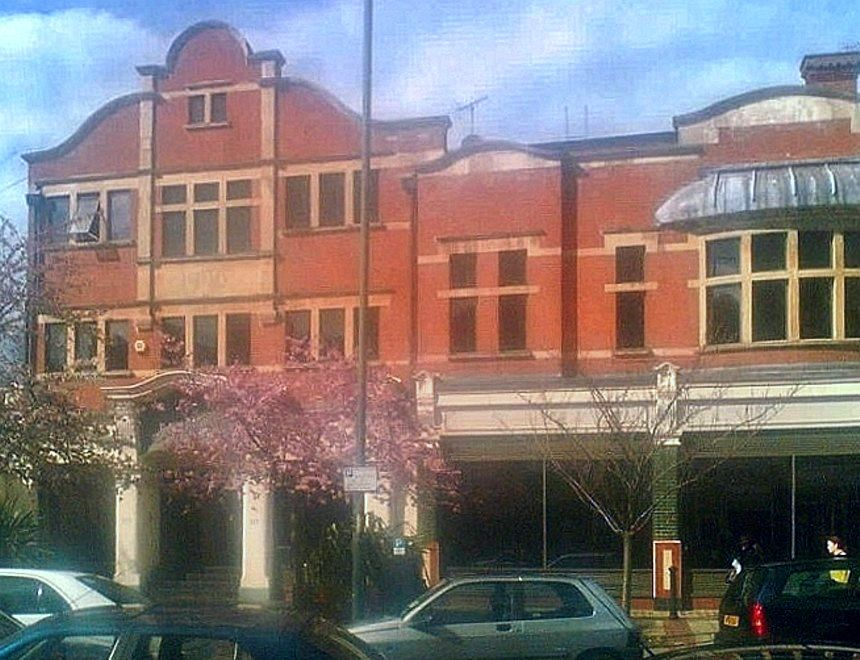
An exterior view of the Olympic Studios on Church Road, Barnes, London, taken in 2008.

Olympic Studios was a British independent recording studio based on Church Road, Barnes, London. It is best known for its recordings of many artists throughout the late 1960s to the first decade of the 21st century, including Jimi Hendrix, the Beatles, the Rolling Stones, Joe Cocker, David Bowie, Marc Bolan, Led Zeppelin, Ella Fitzgerald, Queen, Ray Charles, the Who, B. B. King, Traffic, Prince, the Eagles, Eric Clapton, Family, Adele, Björk, Spice Girls, and MIKA. It is often regarded as being as significant as Abbey Road Studios, and remains an important cultural landmark. The studio's sound mixing desks became famous when the technology and design they pioneered was manufactured commercially.

Although much of Olympic has returned to its original purpose as a cinema, it also still maintains a small recording facility, designed with the help of original members of the studio's staff, who are now also involved in the construction of a much larger studio, performance and teaching space, to run alongside Olympic's cinema at the iconic location.

== First locations ==
The first home of Olympic Sound Studios was in Central London in the late 1950s. It was owned by Angus McKenzie, who had purchased Larry Lyons's Olympia Studio in Fulham. McKenzie then took on a lease for a derelict synagogue situated at Carlton Street, in London's West End.

In conjunction with Richard "Dick" Swettenham, McKenzie opened Olympic's Studio One, with a valve-based recording console from the Olympia Studio. Swettenham designed the first professional transistorised desk in the world, which was installed into Studio One during 1960, along with the first four-track tape recorder in England. The studio first came to prominence in 1958, when its senior sound engineer John Timperley recorded music which was listed in the music magazine Melody Maker's top ten ratings. John Timperley's assistant was Roger Savage, who quickly gained a reputation as a good sound balancer. In 1962, Terry Allen joined the company as an electronic engineer, assisting Dick Swettenham with his new transistorised sound desk. Allen became studio manager, and Timperley left the studios in late 1962, when Keith Grant was given the position of senior sound engineer. Another employee was Michael Ross-Trevor, who later joined CBS Records at the start of a long career in classical music recording. Across both the studio's original locations, several other young staff began their careers at Olympic Studios, among them Gus Dudgeon, who began as a tape operator and was later associated with Elton John, using Olympic Studios for sessions with him as his producer.

Studio One was used by many influential groups, such as the Yardbirds, the Jimi Hendrix Experience, Dave Mason, Alexis Korner, the Seekers and Graham Bond. The Rolling Stones recorded their first single "Come On" at the studio, and Dusty Springfield hits and the Troggs' single "Wild Thing" were also recorded at Olympic during the 1960s. Olympic was a preferred recording studio with A&R staff who worked for record companies including Decca, EMI, Pye and Philips. The studios also hosted London Weekend Television music recordings.

== Relocation to Barnes ==
In 1966, after the lease on the Carlton Street premises was not renewed, McKenzie sold his share of the business to Cliff Adams and John Shakespeare, who moved the studios to Barnes, under the guidance of Keith Grant. Grant oversaw the development of the new studios, bringing in his father, Robertson Grant, as an architect.

Situated at 117 Church Road, the Barnes building was constructed in 1906 and known as Byfeld Hall, a theatre for the Barnes Repertory Company. In its first decade, it was a venue associated with the bioscope, an early form of cinema combined with music hall and instrumentation. Between the 1930s and the post-Second World War era, it was once more a cinema. In the 1950s, the building became television production studios. Actors who played there included John Gielgud and Claude Rains.

== Barnes studios recording history ==
As Grant added to and completed the studio, engineer Eddie Kramer recounted that in 1967 "Olympic Studios was at the cutting edge of technology. We were very innovative and of course we had [I think] the best console in England and possibly the world at the time". "We were ahead in terms of design."

The Rolling Stones were among the first clients of the new Olympic Studios in Barnes, consecutively recording six of their albums there between 1966 and 1973, and becoming such regular visitors that Mick Jagger even contributed to the design of parts of the studio himself. The Stones continued recording, mixing and overdubbing at the studio from 1989 to 1992.

Having been happy with their recording of "Baby, You're A Rich Man" earlier that year, in the summer of 1967 it was at Olympic in Barnes that the Beatles conceived the first parts and ideas of "All You Need Is Love", which a fortnight later debuted as part of Our World, the first ever global satellite broadcast to millions worldwide.

With both bands regularly sharing the studio in the summer of 1967, Lennon and McCartney joined the Rolling Stones recording of "We Love You".

Having moved to the UK in the mid-1960s, Jimi Hendrix also spent a significant proportion of his entire recording career at Olympic, recording large parts of his albums Are You Experienced (1967), Axis: Bold as Love (1967), and Electric Ladyland (1968) at the studio.

For his seminal recording of Bob Dylan's "All Along the Watchtower", Hendrix was joined by two other musicians regularly to be found at Olympic; Dave Mason of Traffic and Brian Jones, the original founder of the Rolling Stones. Hendrix returned to Olympic for sessions in 1969, and, having recently returned from the U.S., for the last time in the first few months of 1970.

In mid-1969, the Beatles were back again at Olympic, this time recording the first parts of "Something" and "You Never Give Me Your Money", as well as ideas for their planned Get Back album. With the band entering their final year and amid periodic disagreements, McCartney on occasion stayed behind on his own to record with other musicians to be found at the studio.

By now, Olympic had also already started being extensively used by Led Zeppelin, who recorded at the studio for all their 1969 debut Led Zeppelin, through to all their studio albums inclusive of Physical Graffiti in 1975, and extending to their single, "Kashmir", of the same year.

In 1969, Ella Fitzgerald arrived to record at the studio, and in 1971 B. B. King arrived to record his In London LP with some of the rock musicians regularly to be found at Olympic.

The Who came to Olympic for their albums Who's Next (1971), Quadrophenia (1973), and Who Are You (1978). Queen recorded part of their landmark album A Night at the Opera (1975), shortly after David Bowie had completed his album Diamond Dogs. Olympic also saw the production of numerous other landmark albums and singles, by the Small Faces, Traffic, Hawkwind, Deep Purple, Soft Machine, Blind Faith, the Seekers and the Moody Blues. Procol Harum recorded all tracks for their eponymous first album Procol Harum (1967) at Olympic, including the single "A Whiter Shade of Pale".

In 1969, Grant commissioned his father to re-design Studio Two, as the now unexpectedly popular studio was causing problems with sound transmission to Studio One. Studio One for example might be recording classical music by Elgar, while Studio Two would be hosting sessions with the Rolling Stones. Robertson Grant successfully innovated a completely floating space weighing seventeen tons, supported by rubber pads. The décor and furnishing of the new Studio Two was designed by Jagger. Later on, Grant added probably the first instant acoustic change, using rough sawn wooden slats which could cover or reveal sound-absorbing panels behind them and change the acoustic sound. This made the room suitable for the recording of both rock and orchestral music, at the pull of a cord.

By the turn of the 1970s, many orchestral works and film scores, such as the original album version of the rock musical Jesus Christ Superstar, were also being recorded at Olympic. The studio produced film music for The Prime of Miss Jean Brodie (1968), The Italian Job (1969), the movie version of Jesus Christ Superstar (1973), The Rocky Horror Picture Show (recorded in Studio Two in 1975) and Life of Brian (1979), amongst others.

Olympic Studios' sound mixing desks were a creation of the maintenance staff and built specially for the studios. They became known as Olympic desks and were developed by Dick Swettenham, Keith Grant, and later Jim McBride in conjunction with Jim Dowler. Swettenham later started to manufacture the consoles commercially as Helios desks. The first desk of this type was commissioned by Grant as Helios One for Studio Two. Olympic desks and their Helios spin-offs are still highly regarded and sought after for their sonic qualities today.

== Virgin Music era ==
For many years, copyright problems with the use of the word "Olympic" prevented the history of the studio from being more widely promoted, which became an important factor in its arch-rival Abbey Road Studios attracting greater recognition, due to promotion by EMI.

In 1987, Virgin Music bought the studios and the property was refitted to a different practical and acoustic specification, further to consulting with Sam Toyoshima, a Japanese studio builder, who declared the studio "unfit to record music in". Barbara Jefferies, then studio manager for Virgin Music at Olympic Studios, instructed that the master tapes of the studio's vast library of recording sessions be discarded. The disposal of these tapes was unsecured. They were put into skips outside the building, remaining there for days. Some were recovered by people unassociated with the studio, and ended up as highly sought-after bootlegs. The revamped studio continued to attract many leading artists during the period of the 1990s and 2000s, such as Adele and Björk.

In December 2008, the Virgin EMI group announced that the longstanding studio facilities would be closed, which occurred the following February.

== New Olympic Studios cinema and studio complex ==
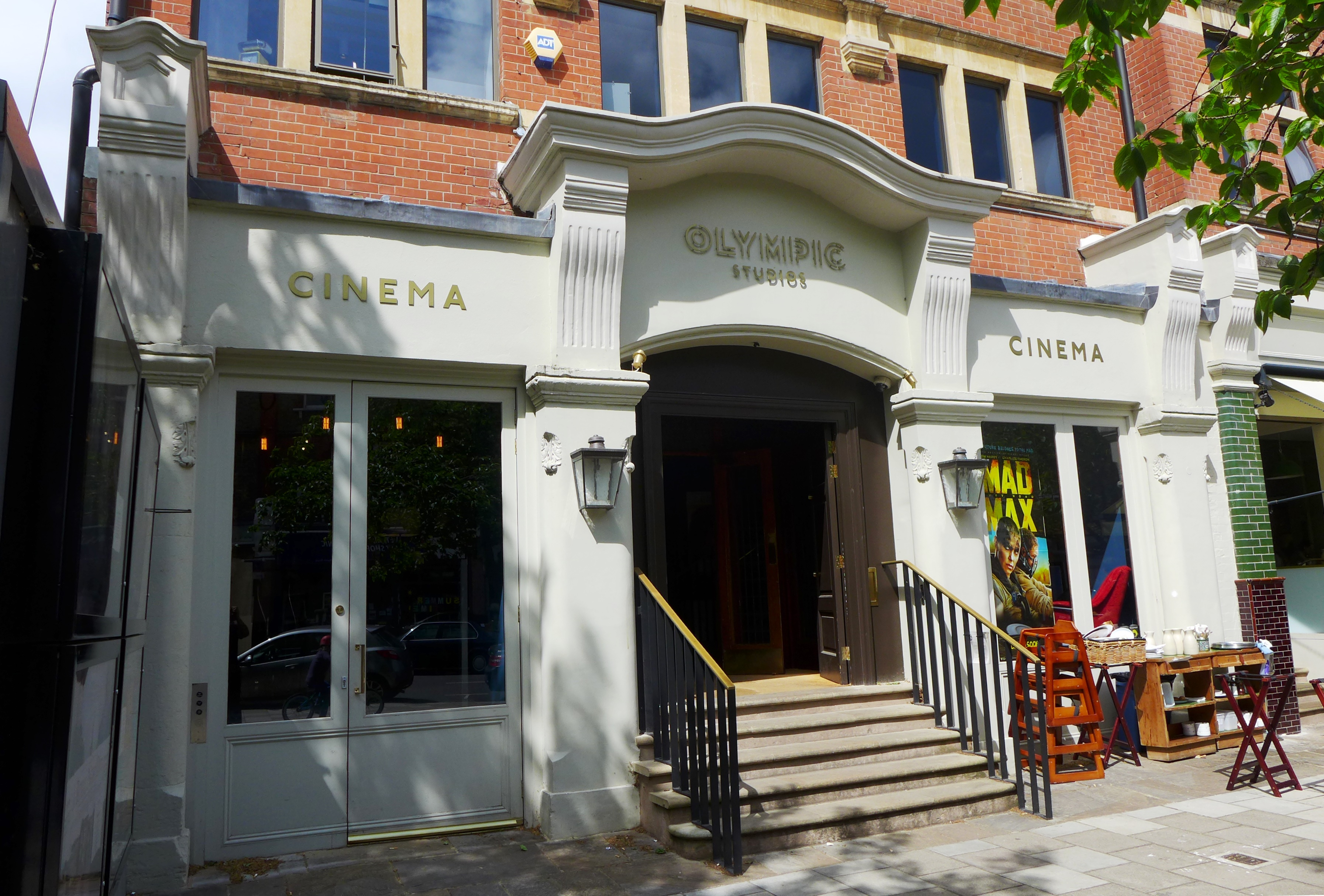
The Olympic Studios cinema in 2015

The London Evening Standard newspaper reported that a buyer for the building as a studio could not be found and it seemed likely that Olympic Studios would lose its musical and cinematic history due to a development of flats and shops. After four years of closure, Olympic Studios re-opened on 14 October 2013 as a cinema with two screens, a café with dining room and a recording studio. The conversion of part of the original building to a small recording studio was undertaken by architect Robertson Grant and the acoustics completed by original studio designer Keith Grant and Russel Pettinger. The new studio facility operates alongside the building's historical role as a cinema using Flare Audio cinema sound. The cinema also uses a Flare sound system.

== Associations ==
Olympic Studios is known for the quality of the recordings produced in its studios, and as a training ground for many successful producers, technicians and engineers, such as:

- George Chkiantz, who is credited with inventing the technique of phasing, on the Small Faces' song "Itchycoo Park".
- Glyn Johns and his brother Andy Johns, best known for their association with the Rolling Stones.
- Gus Dudgeon, who started as a tea boy and became producer for Elton John.
- Roger Savage, who recorded the first Rolling Stones hit "Come On", before moving to Australia, where he became a highly successful engineer, then moving into post-production sound recording with his own company, Soundfirm, which has studios in Melbourne, Sydney, and Beijing.
- Eddie Kramer, Olympic staff engineer who recorded Jimi Hendrix, and is still involved with the post-production of his work.
- Chris Kimsey, best known for his work with the Rolling Stones as producer, and now back at Olympic Studios.
- Jimmy Miller, producer of albums and singles by Family, Traffic, Blind Faith and the Rolling Stones.
- Dick Swettenham, best known for his Olympic console design.
- Roger Mayer, best known for his guitar pedals.
- David Treahearn, Assistant Engineer, now Songwriter, Mixer & Producer with DNR and half of electro duo the Slips.
- Denis O'Regan David Bowie's most prolific photographer, whose first offstage images of the superstar were taken as a teenager outside Olympic Studios during the recording of Diamond Dogs
- Toby Alington, who now has Richmond Studios Productions as his organisation.
- Gerry O'Riordan, best known for his recording and editing skills.
- David Hamilton-Smith, best known for his association with Andrew Lloyd Webber and Tim Rice.
- Terry and Phill Brown, producers of the Who's song "Substitute", and Bob Marley's song "I Shot the Sheriff".
- Paul PDub Walton, best known for work with Björk.
- Doug Bennett, best known for his work with the Stranglers.
- Phil Chapman, film and theatre audio producer.
- Laurence Burrage, producer for XTC.
- Alan O'Duffy, best known for his work with the Rolling Stones, Paul McCartney, Eric Clapton and Rod Stewart.

== Artists at Olympic Studios, 1966–2009 ==
- 808 State
- Roger Alborough
- Adele
- Lily Allen
- Arctic Monkeys
- Babyshambles
- Corinne Bailey Rae
- Shirley Bassey
- The Beatles
- Tony Bennett
- Elmer Bernstein
- Björk
- David Bowie
- The Buzzcocks
- David Byrne
- John Cale
- Lee Towers
- Nick Cave
- Ray Charles
- Eric Clapton
- Joe Cocker
- Elvis Costello
- The Cult
- The Cure
- Sammy Davis Jr.
- Deep Purple
- Depeche Mode
- Donovan
- Dr. Feelgood
- Duran Duran
- The Eagles
- The Electric Blues Company
- Sophie Ellis-Bextor
- Eric Flynn
- Editors
- Brian Eno
- Faces
- Fairport Convention
- Marianne Faithfull
- Family
- Bryan Ferry
- Ella Fitzgerald
- Focus
- Peter Frampton
- Robert Fripp
- Funkadelic
- Peter Gabriel
- Goldfrapp
- Delta Goodrem
- Johnny Hallyday
- Hawkwind
- The Jimi Hendrix Experience
- The Hives
- Hole
- Edmund Hockridge
- Howlin' Wolf
- Humble Pie
- INXS
- The Jam
- Jethro Tull
- Quincy Jones
- Judas Priest
- Kaiser Chiefs
- Berwick Kaler
- Kasabian
- Keane
- The Killers
- B. B. King
- The KLF
- Alexis Korner
- King Crimson
- Kissing the Pink (KTP)
- Jason Kouchak
- Led Zeppelin
- Love
- Kirsty Maccoll
- George Martin
- Massive Attack
- Paul McCartney
- MIKA
- Steve Miller Band
- The Mission
- The Moody Blues
- Van Morrison
- Morrissey
- Mott the Hoople
- The Move
- Motörhead
- Michael Nyman
- The O Band
- Oasis
- Andy Panayi
- Pendulum
- Pink Floyd
- Placebo
- Robert Plant
- Iggy Pop
- Billy Preston
- The Pretenders
- The Pretty Things
- Alan Price
- Primal Scream
- Prince
- Procol Harum
- Pulp
- Suzi Quatro
- Queen
- The Rolling Stones
- Roxy Music
- The Seekers
- Sham 69
- Showaddywaddy
- Slade
- Small Faces
- Spandau Ballet
- Spice Girls
- Soft Machine
- Squeeze
- Cat Stevens
- Stiff Little Fingers
- The Stranglers
- Barbra Streisand
- Suede
- Supertramp
- Bill Tarmey
- Ten Years After
- Thin Lizzy
- Traffic
- Pete Townshend
- The Used
- U2
- The Verve
- Scott Walker
- Paul Weller
- Westlife
- Wishbone Ash
- The Who
- Roger Waters
- Stevie Wonder
- Bruce Woolley and the Camera Club
- The Yardbirds
- The Zombies
- Matt Zimmerman
- The Zutons
