= Church Road, Barnes =

Street in London, England

Coordinates: 51.47429°N 0.24348°W

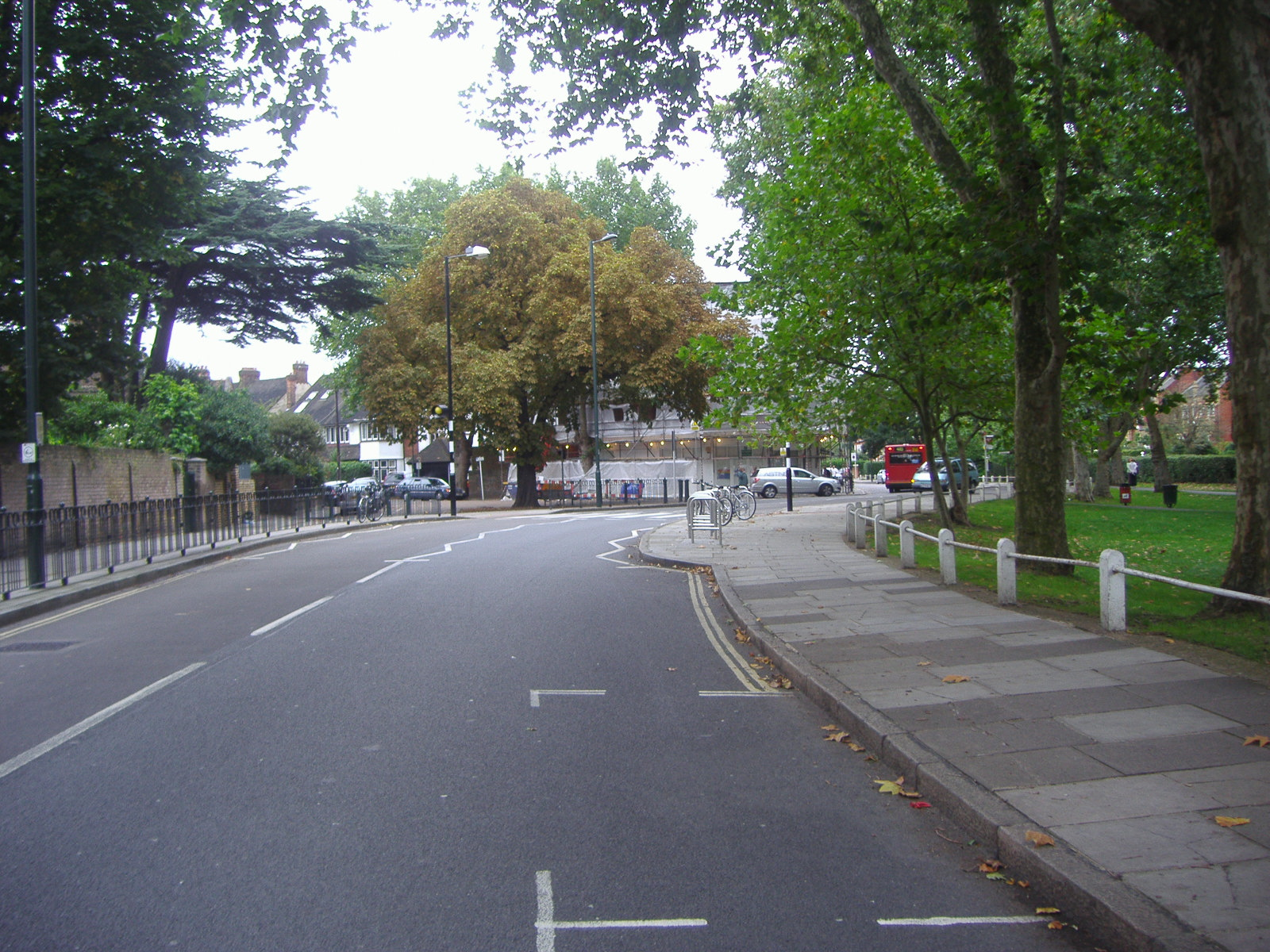
Looking eastwards with Barnes Green on the right.

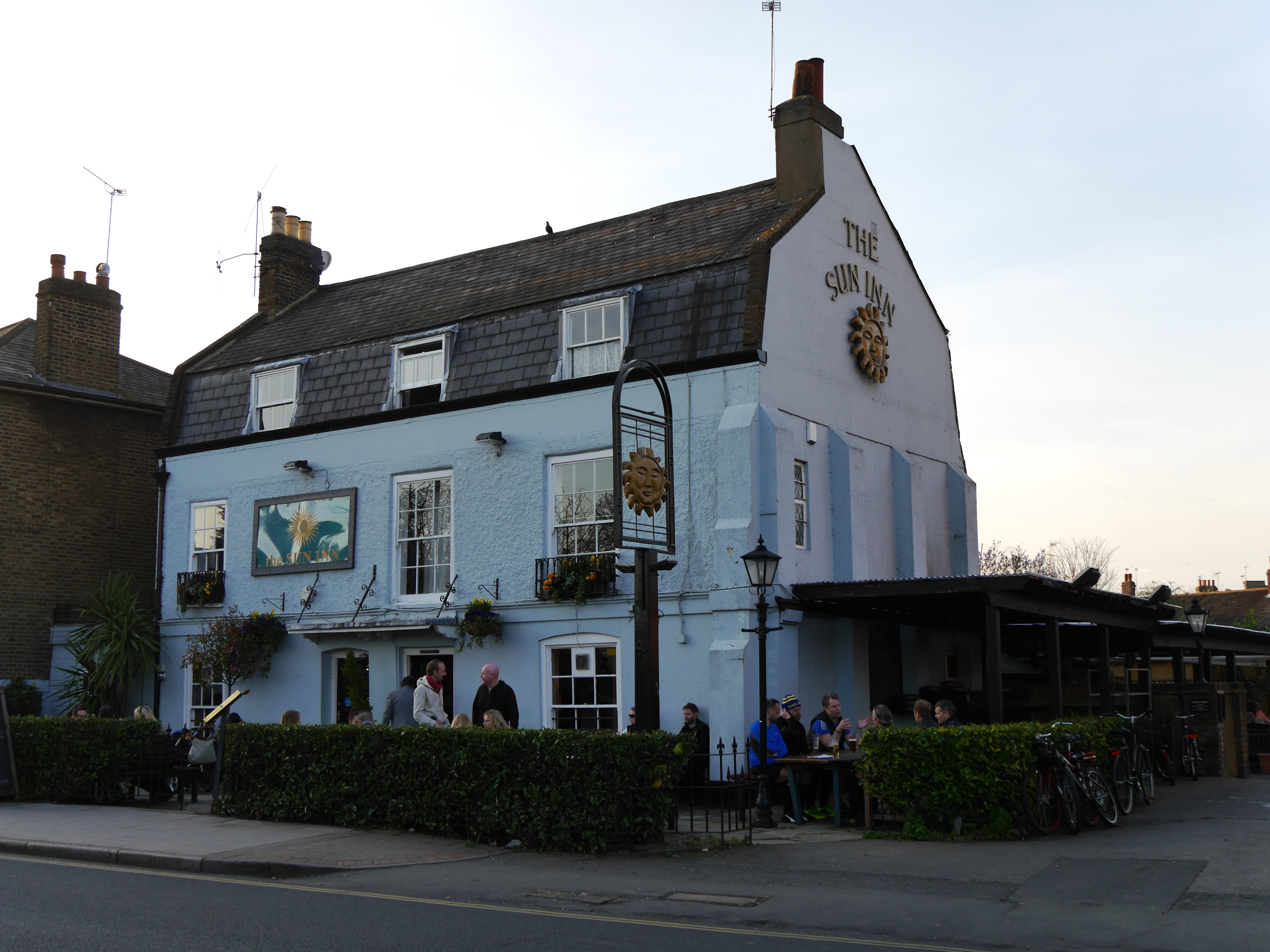
The Sun Inn pub.

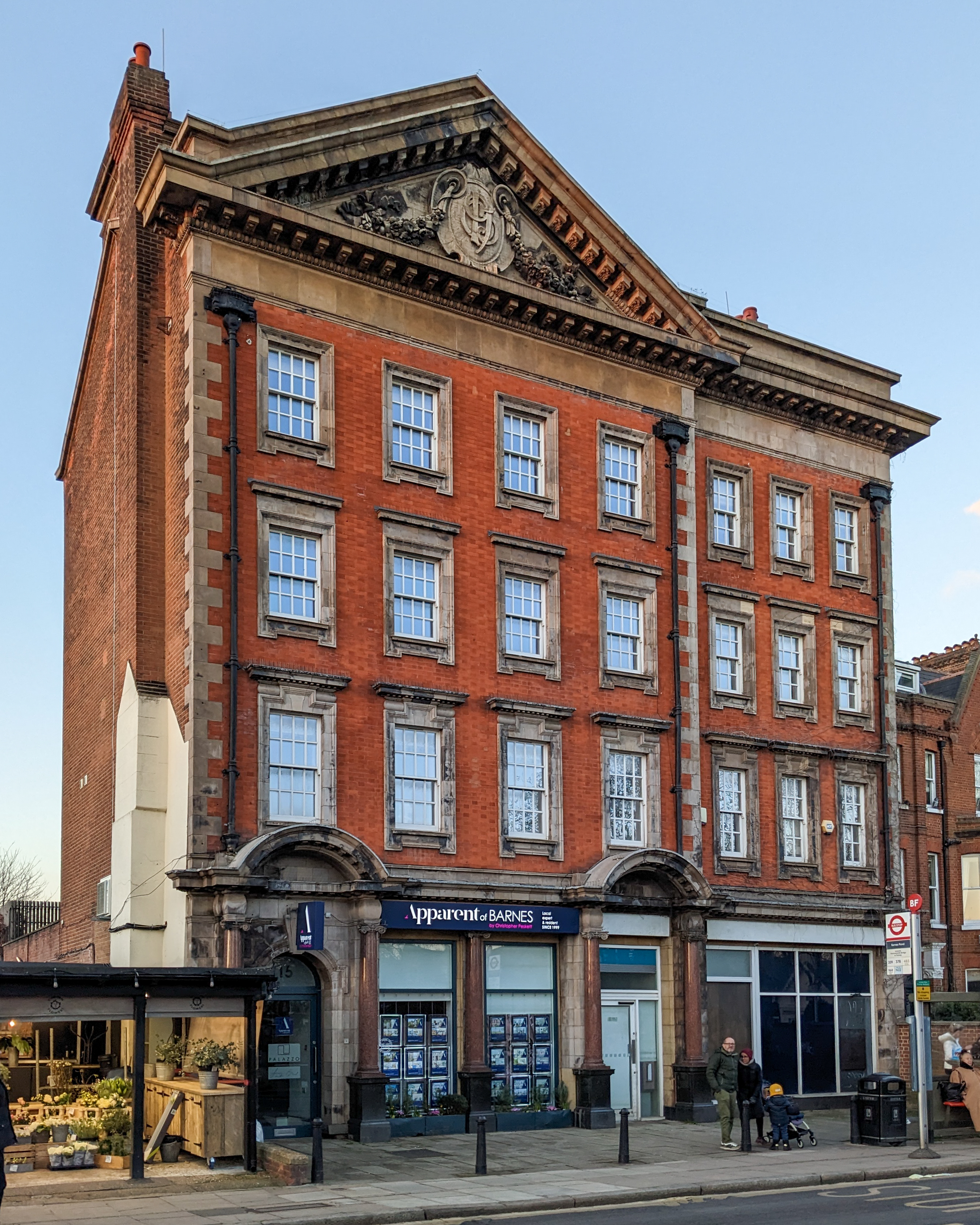
15–17 Church Road, a former bank.

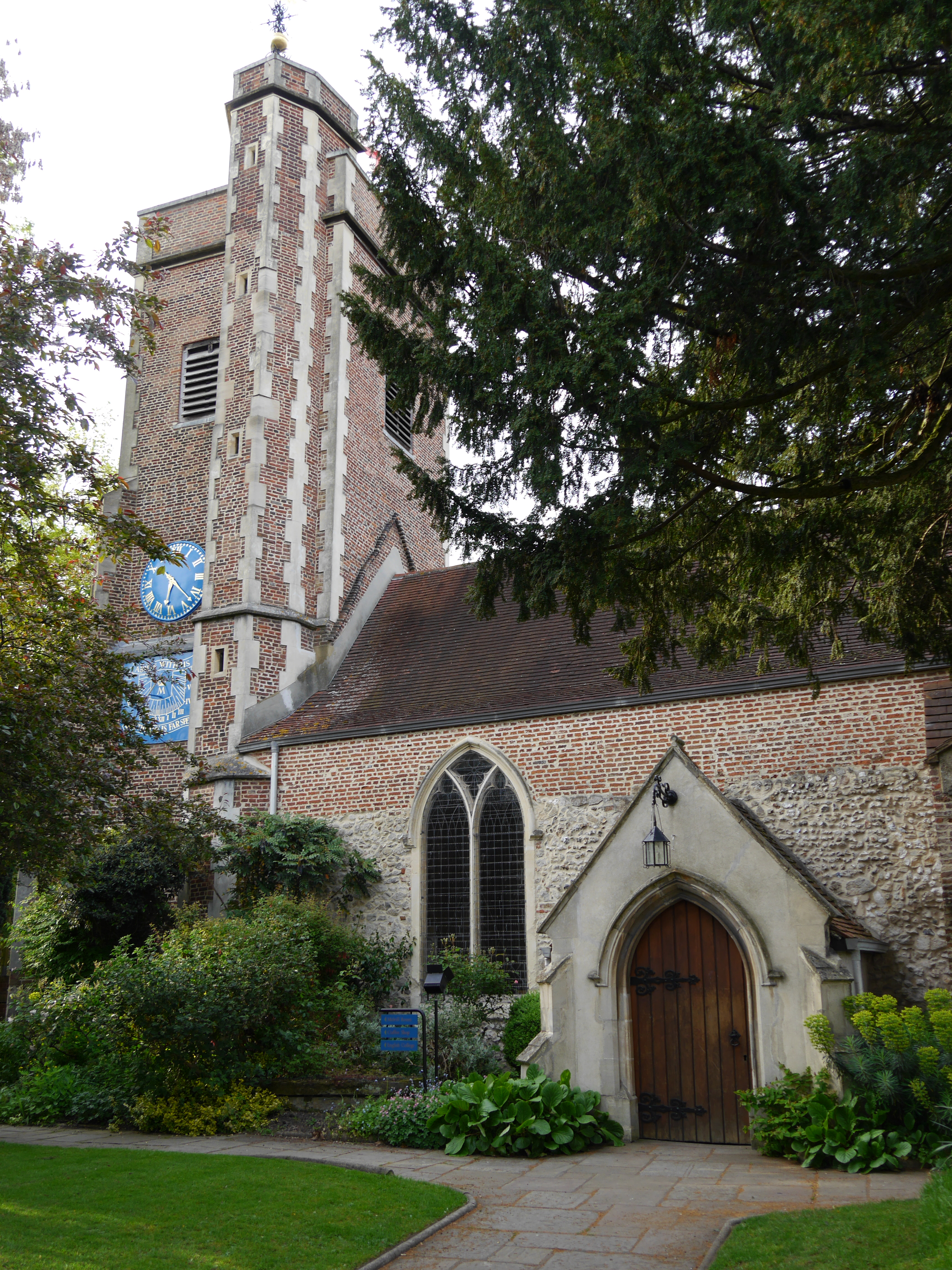
St Mary's Church, which gives the street is name.

Church Road, Barnes is a street in Barnes in the London Borough of Richmond upon Thames. It runs from the junction between Rocks Lane (heading south towards Barnes Common and Barnes Station) and Castlenau (running northwards to Hammersmith Bridge) by the Red Lion pub, westwards to the end of Barnes High Street. It takes its name from the St Mary's Church, a Church of England building dating back to the twelfth century. Also located on the street are the Sun Inn and the early eighteenth century The Homestead, both Grade II listed. Barnes Green runs on the south side of the street. The Olympic Studios were located in the street, notable for the records that Jimi Hendrix made there.

Along with Barnes High Street, it is the historic centre of Barnes. It is a suburb of London, but it was historically a village located several miles away from Central London. With the High Street, it now forms part of the A3003 road. Many of the current buildings date back to the Victorian and Edwardian eras.

== Bibliography ==
- Lang, Paul Howard. Richmond upon Thames Through Time. Amberley Publishing Limited, 2015.
- Pevsner, Nikolaus. London 2: South. Penguin, 1973.
- Saunders, William. Jimi Hendrix: London. Roaring Forties Press, 2010.

Media related to Church Road, Barnes at Wikimedia Commons
