= 2023 Nigerian Senate elections in Bayelsa State =

2023 Senate elections in Bayelsa

- 25 February 2023

All 3 Bayelsa State seats in the Senate of Nigeria
	Majority party	Minority party
Party	PDP	APC
Last election	2	1
Seats before	2	1
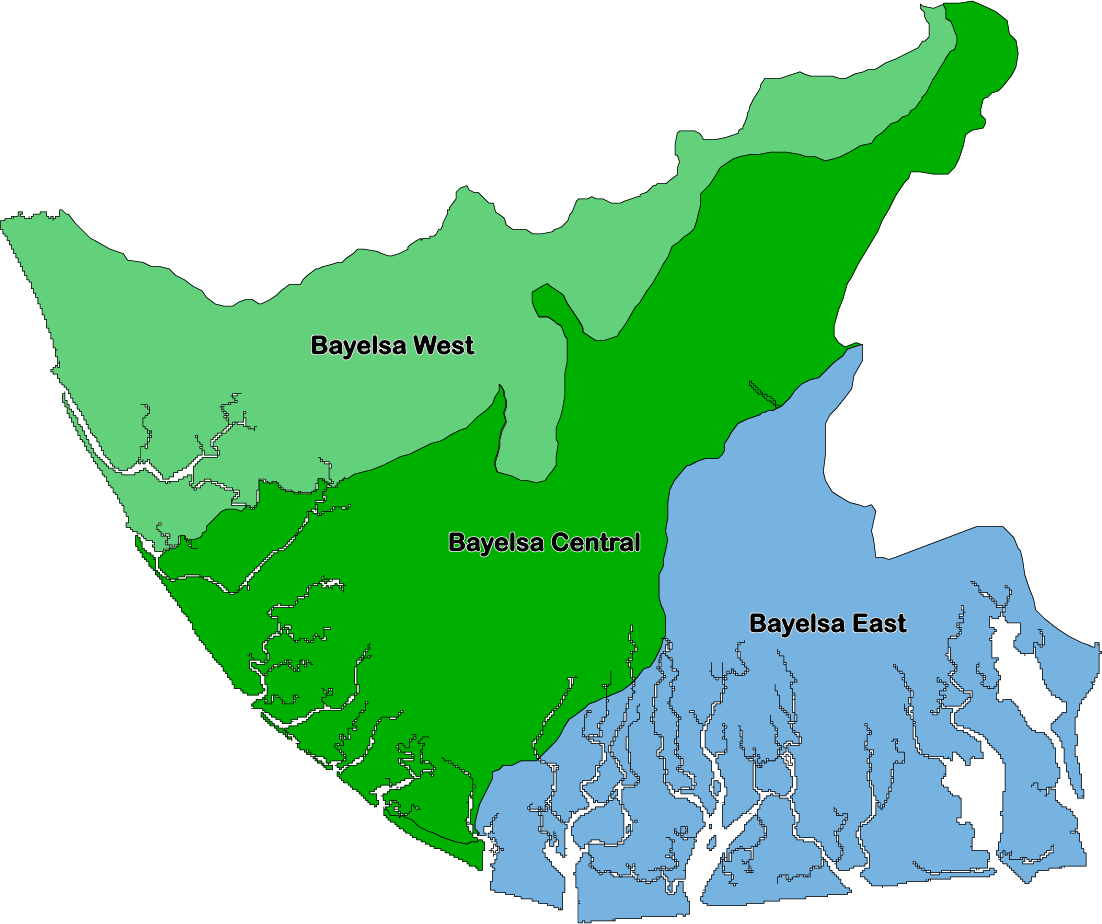
- APC incumbent running for re-election PDP incumbent lost renomination PDP incumbent running for re-election

The 2023 Nigerian Senate elections in Bayelsa State will be held on 25 February 2023, to elect the 3 federal Senators from Bayelsa State, one from each of the state's three senatorial districts. The elections will coincide with the 2023 presidential election, as well as other elections to the Senate and elections to the House of Representatives; with state elections being held two weeks later. Primaries were held between 4 April and 9 June 2022.

== Background ==
In terms of the previous Senate elections, none of the three incumbent senators were returned as both Emmanuel Paulker (PDP-Central) and Ben Murray-Bruce (PDP-East) retired from the Senate while Foster Ogola (PDP-West) lost renomination. In the Central district, Douye Diri retained the seat for the PDP with 54% of the vote while Lawrence Ewhrudjakpo held the West district for the PDP with 71%; on the other hand, Biobarakuma Degi (APC) gained the East district from the PDP with 46% of the vote. These senatorial results were an example of APC gains in the state as the party also gained two House of Representatives seats and Bayelsa swung the most towards Buhari in the presidential election of any state. Later in 2019, the swing towards the APC dramatically increased as its gubernatorial nominee David Lyon controversially won by a large margin but Diri was declared victor after Lyon was disqualified before the inauguration. Ensuing senate by-elections in 2020 were then easily won by the PDP, cementing the state's potentially erratic voting record.

Soon after starting their terms, the three newly elected senators gained notability as all three took part in the 2019 Bayelsa State gubernatorial election: Diri was the PDP nominee with Ewhrudjakpo as his deputy running mate while Degi was deputy running mate to APC nominee David Lyon. Although Lyon won the election, albeit controversially, discrepancies in Degi's documentation led the Supreme Court to disqualify the ticket and award victory to Diri and Ewhrudjakpo. When they took office in February 2020, their Senate seats were vacated leading to December 2020 by-elections. The PDP held both seat with Moses Cleopas gaining 86% in the East district while Henry Seriake Dickson won in the West district also with 86%.

== Overview ==
Affiliation	Party		Total
Affiliation	PDP	APC	Total
Previous Election	2	1	3
Before Election	2	1	3
After Election	3	0	3

== Summary ==
District	Incumbent		Results	
District	Incumbent	Party	Status	Candidates
Bayelsa Central	Moses Cleopas	PDP	Incumbent lost renomination New member elected PDP hold	▌Timipa Tiwei Orunimighe (APC); ▌ ✓ Kombowei Benson (PDP)
Bayelsa East	Biobarakuma Degi	APC	Incumbent lost re-election New member elected PDP gain	▌Biobarakuma Degi (APC); ▌ ✓ Benson Agadaga (PDP)
Bayelsa West	Henry Seriake Dickson	PDP	Incumbent re-elected	▌Wilson Ayakpo Dauyegha (APC); ▌ ✓ Henry Seriake Dickson (PDP)

== Bayelsa Central ==
2023 Bayelsa Central Senatorial District election
- 25 February 2023
Nominee	Timipa Tiwei Orunimighe	Konbowei Benson
Party	APC	PDP
Senator before election
Moses Cleopas
PDP
Elected Senator
To be determined
To be determined

The Bayelsa Central Senatorial District covers the local government areas of Kolokuma/Opokuma, Southern Ijaw, and Yenagoa. In 2019, Douye Diri (PDP) was elected to the seat with 53.9% of the vote; however, Diri was elected Governor of Bayelsa State later that year and left the Senate in February 2020. Thus the incumbent is Moses Cleopas (PDP), who was elected with 85.8% of the vote in a December 2020 by-election. Cleopas sought election to a full term but was defeated in the PDP primary.

=== Primary elections ===
==== All Progressives Congress ====
On 20 April 2022, the APC National Executive Committee announced the party's schedule for senatorial primaries, setting its expression of interest form price at ₦3 million and nomination form price at ₦17 million with a 50% discount for candidates younger than 40 while women and candidates with disabilities get free nomination forms. Forms were to be sold from 26 April to 6 May until the deadline was later extended to 10 May then 12 May. After the submission of nomination forms by 13 May, candidates were screened by a party committee on 14 and 15 May while 18 May was the date for the screening appeal process. Ward congresses and LGA congresses were set for 16 and 17 May to elect delegates for the primary. Candidates approved by the screening process advanced to a primary set for 27 May, in concurrence with other APC senatorial primaries; challenges to the result could be made on 28 May.

On May 28, two candidates contested a direct primary that ended with former Southern Ijaw Local Government Chairman Timipa Tiwei Orunimighe emerging as the nominee after results showed him defeating lawyer Julie Okah-Donli by a significant margin.

APC primary results
Party	Candidate	Votes	%
APC	Timipa Tiwei Orunimighe	38,532	90.59%
APC	Julie Okah-Donli	4,003	9.41%
Total votes		42,535	100.00%

==== People's Democratic Party ====
On 16 March 2022, the national PDP announced its senatorial primary timetable, setting its expression of interest form price at ₦1 million and the nomination form price at ₦20 million with a 50% discount for candidates between 25 and 30. Forms were to be sold until 1 April but the party later extended the deadline four times before reaching a final deadline of 22 April. After the submission of nomination forms by 25 April, candidates were screened by a party committee on 27 April while 2 May was the rescheduled date for the screening appeal process. Ward congresses were set for 29 April and LGA congresses were rescheduled for 10 May to elect delegates for the primary. Candidates approved by the screening process advanced to a primary set for 23 May, in concurrence with other PDP senatorial primaries but due to often violently enforced Monday stay-at-home orders by separatists, southeastern state parties held their primaries on 24 May; challenges to the result could be made on 25 May.

The indirect primary was beset by controversy when Cleopas' name was replaced on the ballot paper with a different name; although the primary organisers eventually printed new ballots, Cleopas had already rejected the process and walked out of the venue. After collation, results showed a sizable win for Konbowei Benson—former Secretary to the State Government and former Speaker of the Bayelsa State House of Assembly. Cleopas challenged the Benson's eligibility at the Federal High Court but Benson's candidacy was upheld in a late November ruling.

PDP primary results
Party	Candidate	Votes	%
PDP	Konbowei Benson	110	83.33%
PDP	Moses Cleopas	22	16.67%
Total votes		132	100.00%

=== General election ===
==== Results ====
2023 Bayelsa Central Senatorial District election
Party	Candidate	Votes	%
A	Nimiye George Suoteigha		
AA	Ayah Enetimi		
APP	Joseph Gerebo		
ADC	James Braithwaite		
APC	Timipa Tiwei Orunimighe		
APM	Abson Abalaba		
LP	Dino Stephen Seleke		
NRM	Clarkson Jackson Ebibode		
New Nigeria Peoples Party	Ogionwo Austin Febo		
PDP	Konbowei Benson		
SDP	Ayebaketemunu Emendu		
ZLP	Kenny Justice Fiseye		
Total votes			100.00%
Invalid or blank votes			N/A
Turnout			

== Bayelsa East ==
2023 Bayelsa East Senatorial District election
- 25 February 2023
Nominee	Biobarakuma Degi	Benson Sunday Agadaga
Party	APC	PDP
Senator before election
Biobarakuma Degi
APC
Elected Senator
To be determined
To be determined

The Bayelsa East Senatorial District covers the local government areas of Brass, Ogbia, and Nembe. The incumbent Biobarakuma Degi (APC), who was elected with 45.7% of the vote in 2019, is seeking re-election.

=== Primary elections ===
==== All Progressives Congress ====
On 20 April 2022, the APC National Executive Committee announced the party's schedule for senatorial primaries, setting its expression of interest form price at ₦3 million and nomination form price at ₦17 million with a 50% discount for candidates younger than 40 while women and candidates with disabilities get free nomination forms. Forms were to be sold from 26 April to 6 May until the deadline was later extended to 10 May then 12 May. After the submission of nomination forms by 13 May, candidates were screened by a party committee on 14 and 15 May while 18 May was the date for the screening appeal process. Ward congresses and LGA congresses were set for 16 and 17 May to elect delegates for the primary. Candidates approved by the screening process advanced to a primary set for 27 May, in concurrence with other APC senatorial primaries; challenges to the result could be made on 28 May.

In the months before the primary, controversy emerged over Degi's re-election campaign; according to opposing community groups and others, the office is meant to be rotated between the district's three local government areas and Degi's renomination would violate this informal zoning agreement. Despite the scandal, on May 28, Degi was renominated over former House of Representatives member Sodaguo Festus Omini in a landslide.

APC primary results
Party	Candidate	Votes	%
APC	Biobarakuma Degi	43,433	94.56%
APC	Sodaguo Festus Omini	2,497	5.44%
Total votes		45,930	100.00%

==== People's Democratic Party ====
On 16 March 2022, the national PDP announced its senatorial primary timetable, setting its expression of interest form price at ₦1 million and the nomination form price at ₦20 million with a 50% discount for candidates between 25 and 30. Forms were to be sold until 1 April but the party later extended the deadline four times before reaching a final deadline of 22 April. After the submission of nomination forms by 25 April, candidates were screened by a party committee on 27 April while 2 May was the rescheduled date for the screening appeal process. Ward congresses were set for 29 April and LGA congresses were rescheduled for 10 May to elect delegates for the primary. Candidates approved by the screening process advanced to a primary set for 23 May, in concurrence with other PDP senatorial primaries but due to often violently enforced Monday stay-at-home orders by separatists, southeastern state parties held their primaries on 24 May; challenges to the result could be made on 25 May.

On the primary date, three candidates contested an indirect primary that ended with former Chief of Staff to the State Government Benson Sunday Agadaga winning the nomination after results showed him defeating Jude Amiditor Rex-Ogbuku—former Executive Secretary of the Federal Character Commission—by a 24% margin.

PDP primary results
Party	Candidate	Votes	%
PDP	Benson Agadaga	67	60.91%
PDP	Jude Amiditor Rex-Ogbuku	41	37.27%
PDP	Nyenami Odual	2	1.82%
Total votes		110	100.00%
Invalid or blank votes		0	N/A
Turnout		110	Unknown

=== General election ===
==== Results ====
2023 Bayelsa East Senatorial District election
Party	Candidate	Votes	%
A	Happiness Ewa		
APP	Inisaziba Rufus Ogoniba		
ADC	Ebikpolade Fuludu		
APC	Biobarakuma Degi		
APM	Omubo Benibo		
NRM	Kenneth Youngman		
New Nigeria Peoples Party	Nabhomam Ibibo		
PDP	Benson Sunday Agadaga		
Total votes			100.00%
Invalid or blank votes			N/A
Turnout			

== Bayelsa West ==
2023 Bayelsa West Senatorial District election
- 25 February 2023
Nominee	Wilson Ayakpo Dauyegha	Henry Seriake Dickson
Party	APC	PDP
Senator before election
Henry Seriake Dickson
PDP
Elected Senator
To be determined
To be determined

The Bayelsa West Senatorial District covers the local government areas of Ekeremor and Sagbama. In 2019, Lawrence Ewhrudjakpo (PDP) was elected to the seat with 70.9% of the vote; however, Ewhrudjakpo was elected Deputy Governor of Bayelsa State later that year and left the Senate in February 2020. Thus the incumbent is Henry Seriake Dickson (PDP), who was elected with 86.3% of the vote in a December 2020 by-election. Dickson is running for election to a full term.

=== Primary elections ===
==== All Progressives Congress ====
On 20 April 2022, the APC National Executive Committee announced the party's schedule for senatorial primaries, setting its expression of interest form price at ₦3 million and nomination form price at ₦17 million with a 50% discount for candidates younger than 40 while women and candidates with disabilities get free nomination forms. Forms were to be sold from 26 April to 6 May until the deadline was later extended to 10 May then 12 May. After the submission of nomination forms by 13 May, candidates were screened by a party committee on 14 and 15 May while 18 May was the date for the screening appeal process. Ward congresses and LGA congresses were set for 16 and 17 May to elect delegates for the primary. Candidates approved by the screening process advanced to a primary set for 27 May, in concurrence with other APC senatorial primaries; challenges to the result could be made on 28 May.

On May 28, two candidates contested a direct primary that ended with Wilson Ayakpo Dauyegha—MHA for Ekeremor II—defeating Robinson Etolor in a landslide.

APC primary results
Party	Candidate	Votes	%
APC	Wilson Ayakpo Dauyegha	23,187	91.54%
APC	Robinson Etolor	2,142	8.46%
Total votes		25,329	100.00%

==== People's Democratic Party ====
On 16 March 2022, the national PDP announced its senatorial primary timetable, setting its expression of interest form price at ₦1 million and the nomination form price at ₦20 million with a 50% discount for candidates between 25 and 30. Forms were to be sold until 1 April but the party later extended the deadline four times before reaching a final deadline of 22 April. After the submission of nomination forms by 25 April, candidates were screened by a party committee on 27 April while 2 May was the rescheduled date for the screening appeal process. Ward congresses were set for 29 April and LGA congresses were rescheduled for 10 May to elect delegates for the primary. Candidates approved by the screening process advanced to a primary set for 23 May, in concurrence with other PDP senatorial primaries but due to often violently enforced Monday stay-at-home orders by separatists, southeastern state parties held their primaries on 24 May; challenges to the result could be made on 25 May.

In the months before the primary, controversy emerged over Dickson's re-election campaign; according to opposing community groups and others, the office is meant to be rotated between the district's two local government areas and Dickson's renomination would violate this informal zoning agreement. In contrast, pro-Dickson groups claim that the zoning agreement was never followed or recognized and thus Dickson can run for re-election. Despite the controversy, Dickson was renominated over Donald Daunemeghan in a landslide.

PDP primary results
Party	Candidate	Votes	%
PDP	Henry Seriake Dickson	57	95.00%
PDP	Donald Daunemeghan	3	5.00%
Total votes		60	100.00%

=== General election ===
==== Results ====
2023 Bayelsa West Senatorial District election
Party	Candidate	Votes	%
AA	Keme-epigha Pius Akusi		
APP	Olando Isaiah Salo		
ADC	Goodnews Young Baraburu		
APC	Wilson Ayakpo Dauyegha		
APM	Dennis Michael Enebi		
NRM	Headman Jonah Eseburuku		
New Nigeria Peoples Party	Oweifie Ebi Ayeku		
PDP	Henry Seriake Dickson		
YPP	Tombra Mohammed		
ZLP	Alexander Peretu		
Total votes			100.00%
Invalid or blank votes			N/A
Turnout			

== See also ==
- 2023 Nigerian Senate election
- 2023 Nigerian elections
