= 2023 Bayelsa State gubernatorial election =

State election in Nigeria

- 11 November 2023
Nominee	Douye Diri	Timipre Sylva
Party	PDP	APC
Running mate	Lawrence Ewhrudjakpo	Joshua Maciver
Popular vote	175,196	110,108
Percentage	60.93%	38.29%
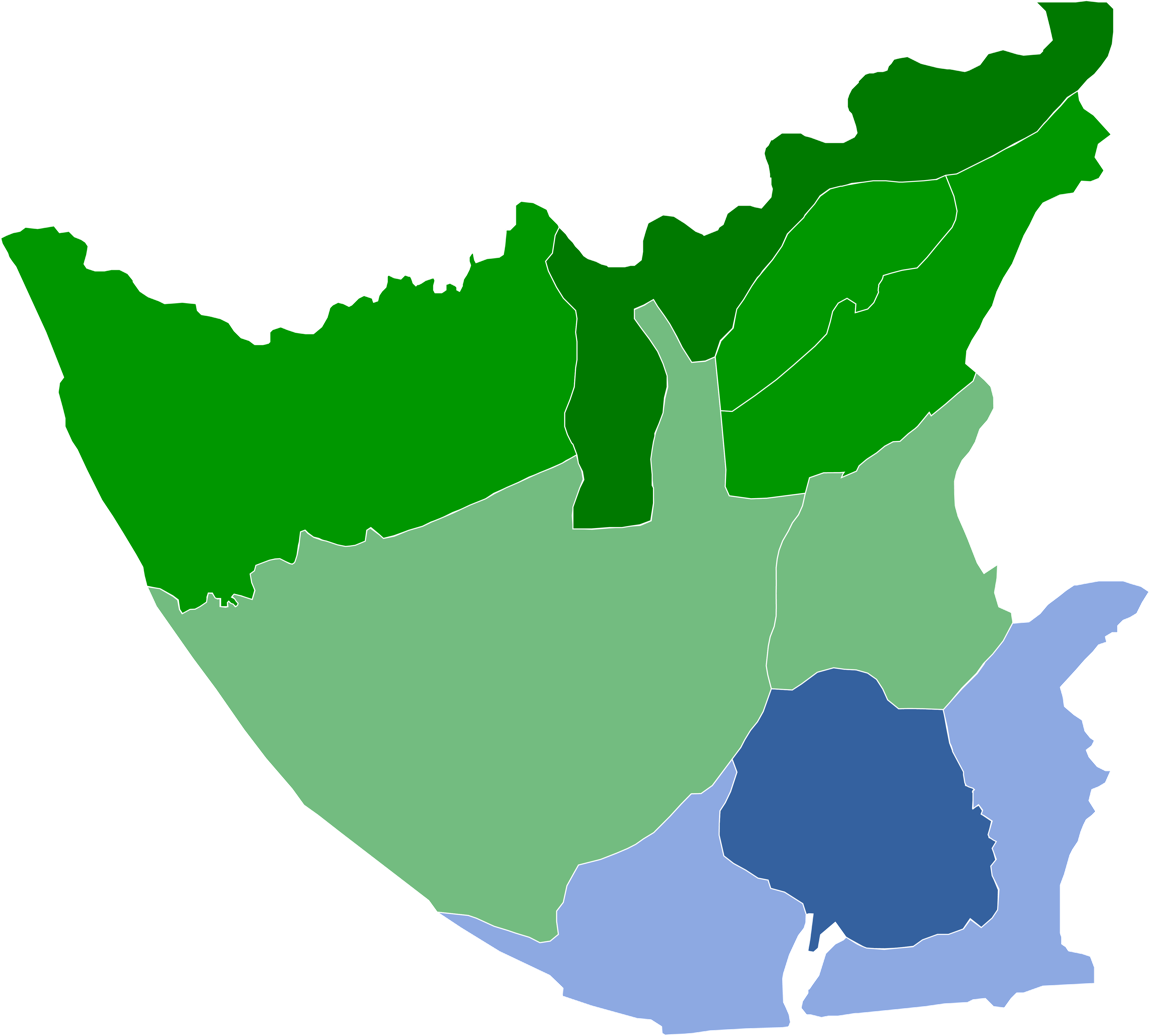
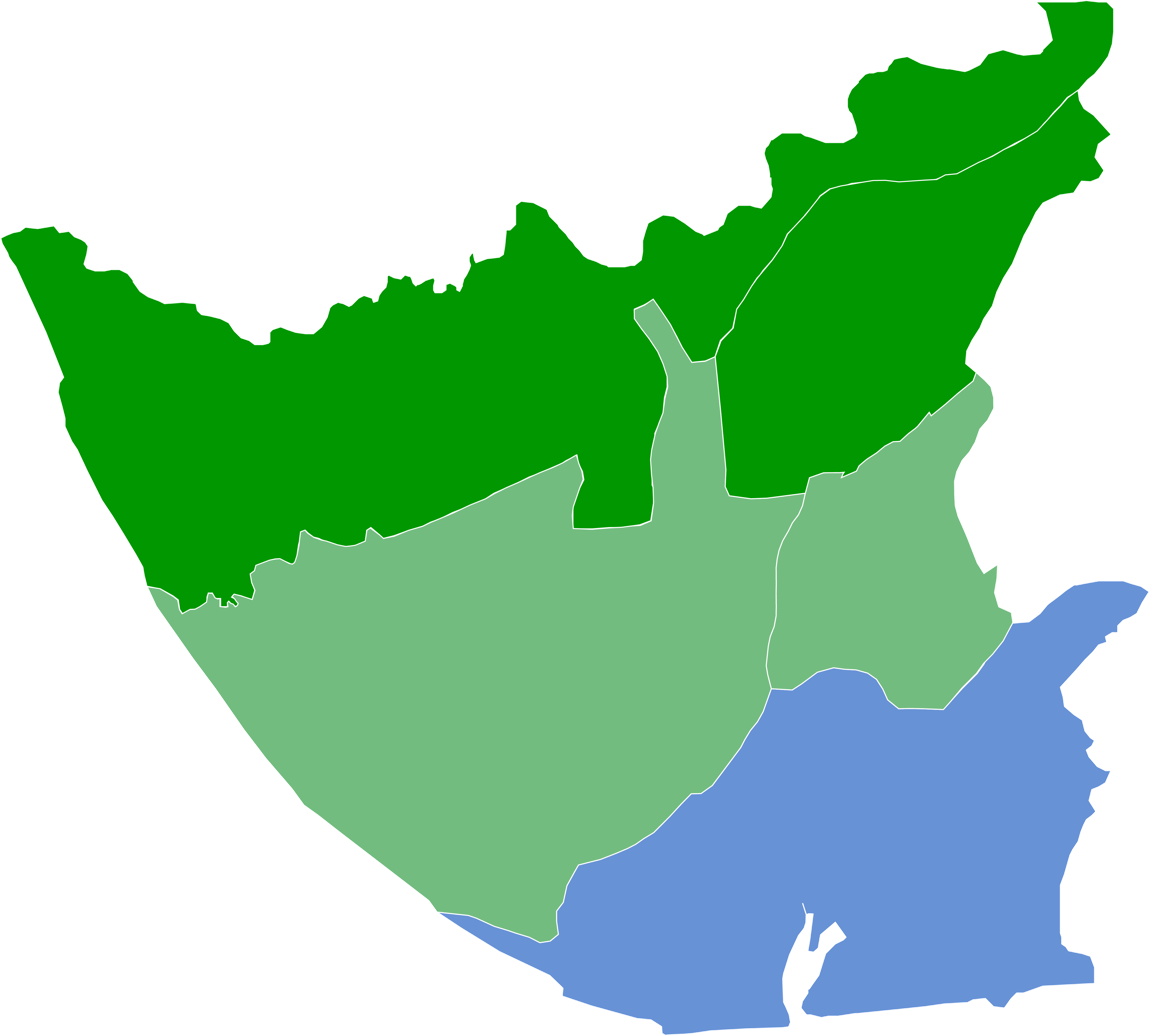
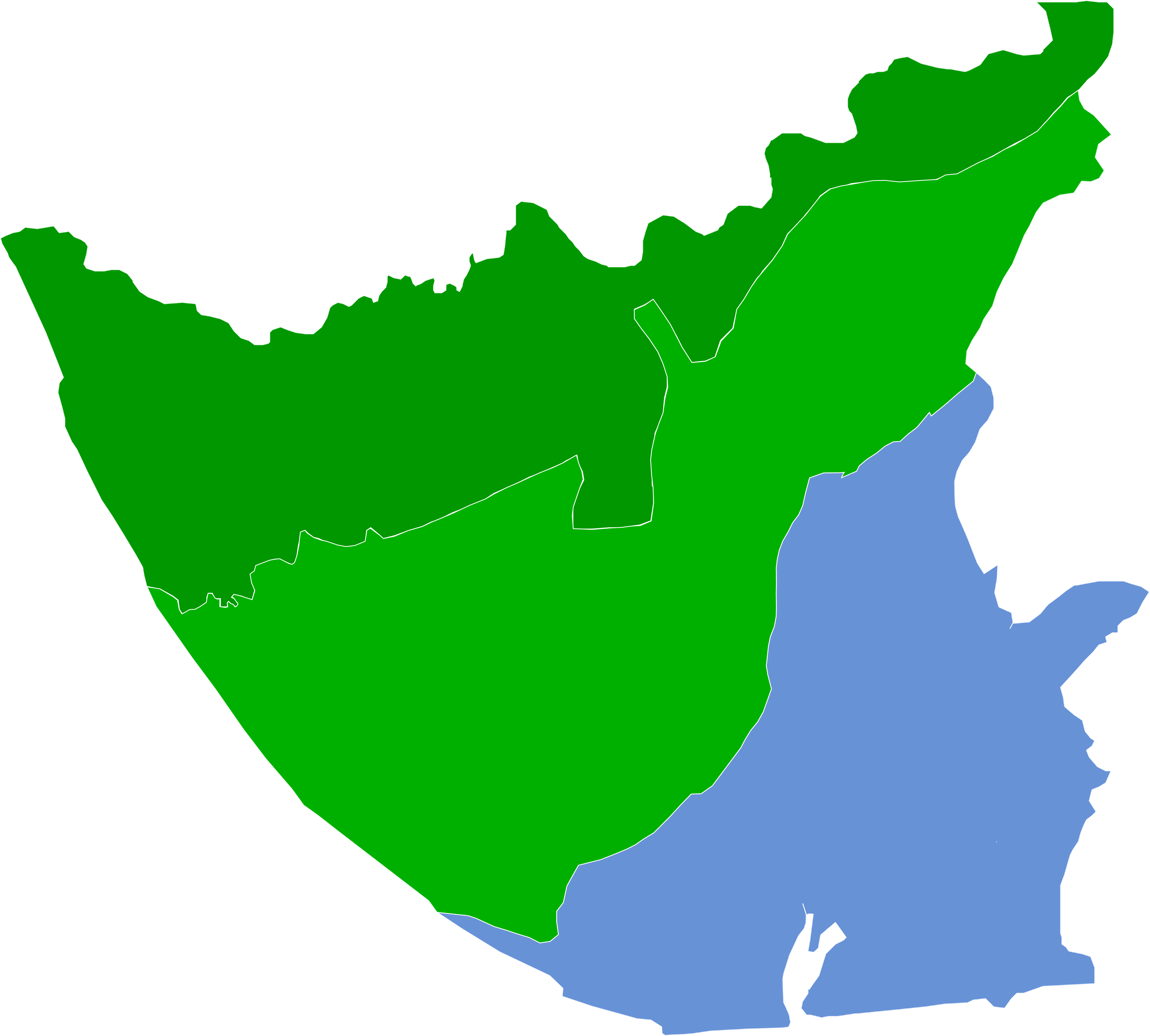
- Sylva: 50–60% 60–70% 70–80% 80–90% Diri: 50–60% 60–70% 70–80% 80–90%
Governor before election
Douye Diri
PDP
Elected Governor
Douye Diri
PDP

The 2023 Bayelsa State gubernatorial election took place on 11 November 2023 to elect the Governor of Bayelsa State. Incumbent PDP Governor Douye Diri won election to a second term by a 23.6% margin of victory over former Governor Timipre Sylva, the APC nominee.

The primaries, scheduled for between 27 March and 17 April 2023, resulted in Diri being renominated by the Peoples Democratic Party unopposed on 12 April while the All Progressives Congress nominated Sylva on 15 April.

On 21 March, INEC declared Diri as the victor with official totals showing him winning about 175,000 votes (~61% of the vote) to defeat Sylva with about 110,000 votes (~41% of the vote). Due to alleged irregularities, Sylva rejected the results and filed a challenge at the electoral tribunal. The legal case eventually reached the Supreme Court, which upheld the election of Diri in an August 2024 judgment.

== Electoral system ==
The Governor of Bayelsa State is elected using a modified two-round system. To be elected in the first round, a candidate must receive the plurality of the vote and over 25% of the vote in at least two-thirds of local government areas. If no candidate passes this threshold, a second round will be held between the top candidate and the next candidate to have received a plurality of votes in the highest number of local government areas.

== Background ==
Bayelsa State is a small state in the South South mainly populated by Ijaw peoples; although its oil reserves make it one of the most resource-rich states in the nation, Bayelsa has faced challenges in security and environmental degradation in large part due to years of systemic corruption and illegal oil bunkering.

Politically, the state's early 2019 elections were categorized as the continuation of the PDP's dominance albeit with the APC making considerable gains by gaining one senate and two House of Representatives seats. The APC also gained ground in the assembly election and Bayelsa also was the state that swung the most towards Buhari in the presidential election, although that could be chalked up to former Governor Goodluck Jonathan no longer being PDP nominee. Later in 2019, the swing towards the APC dramatically increased as its gubernatorial nominee David Lyon won by a large margin but Diri was declared victor after Lyon was disqualified before the inauguration. Ensuing senate by-elections in 2020 were then easily won by the PDP, cementing the state's potentially erratic voting record.

During its term, the Diri administration's stated focuses included economic diversification, agricultural development, and the completion of the Bayelsa International Airport. In terms of his performance, Diri was commended for the completion of the airport and the Nembe Unity Bridge while being criticized for forcing his way past airport security checkpoints in August 2021 and praising former military dictator Sani Abacha.

== Primary elections ==
The primaries, along with any potential challenges to primary results, will take place between 27 March and 17 April 2022.

=== All Progressives Congress ===
In February 2022, the national APC announced its gubernatorial primaries' schedule, setting its expression of interest form price at ₦10 million and nomination form price at ₦40 million with a 50% nomination form discount for candidates younger than 40 while women and candidates with disabilities get free nomination forms. Both primary forms were sold from 14 to 22 February 2023. The form submission deadline was set for 22 February while candidates would be screened between 24 and 26 February. Ward congresses were set for 8 April in Bayelsa and Imo states to elect delegates for the primary while the Kogi congresses had been held on 8 February. Candidates approved by the screening process advanced to a primary set for 10 April, in concurrence with the other APC gubernatorial primaries; challenges to the result could be made on 12 April.

==== Purchased forms ====
- David Lyon: 2019 APC gubernatorial nominee
- Timipre Sylva: Minister of State for Petroleum Resources (2019–present), 2015 APC gubernatorial nominee, and former Governor (2007–2008; 2008–2012)

==== Potential ====
- Peremobowei Ebebi: 2020 Bayelsa West senatorial by-election nominee and former Deputy Governor
- Heineken Lokpobiri: former Minister of State for Agriculture and Rural Development (2015–2019) and former Senator for Bayelsa West (2007–2015)

=== People's Democratic Party ===
On 1 December 2022, the national PDP announced its gubernatorial primaries' schedule. Both primary forms—the expression of interest and nomination forms—were sold from 16 to 31 January 2023, aside from Kogi State where the deadline was later extended to 13 February. Similarly, all form submission deadlines were pushed back from 13 February to 1 March. Ward congresses were set for 28-29 March and LGA congresses were rescheduled for 8 April to elect delegates for the primary. Candidates approved by the screening process advanced to a primary set for 14-15 May, in concurrence with all other PDP gubernatorial primaries; challenges to the result could be made in the following days.

==== Cleared by screening committee ====
- Douye Diri: Governor (2020–present)

==== Declined ====
- Timi Alaibe: 2019 PDP gubernatorial candidate and former NDDC Managing Director/CEO

== Conduct ==
=== Electoral timetable ===
On 25 October 2022, the Independent National Electoral Commission released the timetable, setting out key dates and deadlines for the election.

- 14 November 2022 – Publication of Notice of Election
- 27 March 2023 – First day for the conduct of party primaries
- 17 April 2023 – Final day for the conduct of party primaries, including the resolution of disputes arising from them
- 24 April 2023 – First day for submission of nomination forms to INEC via the online portal
- 5 May 2023 – Final day for submission of nomination forms to INEC via the online portal
- 9 June 2023 – Publication of final nominee list
- 14 June 2023 – Commencement of the official campaign period
- 9 November 2023 – Final day of the official campaign period

== General election ==
=== Results ===
Candidates' vote share
1. Douye Diri (PDP) (60.9%)
2. Timipre Sylva (APC) (38.3%)
3. Other candidates (0.78%)

2023 Bayelsa State gubernatorial election
Party	Candidate	Votes	%
A			
AA			
ADP			
APP			
AAC			
ADC			
APM			
APC			
APGA			
BP			
LP			
New Nigeria Peoples Party			
NRM			
PDP			
PRP			
SDP			
YPP			
ZLP			
Total votes			100.00%
Turnout			

==== By senatorial district ====
Percentage of the vote won by each major candidate by district.

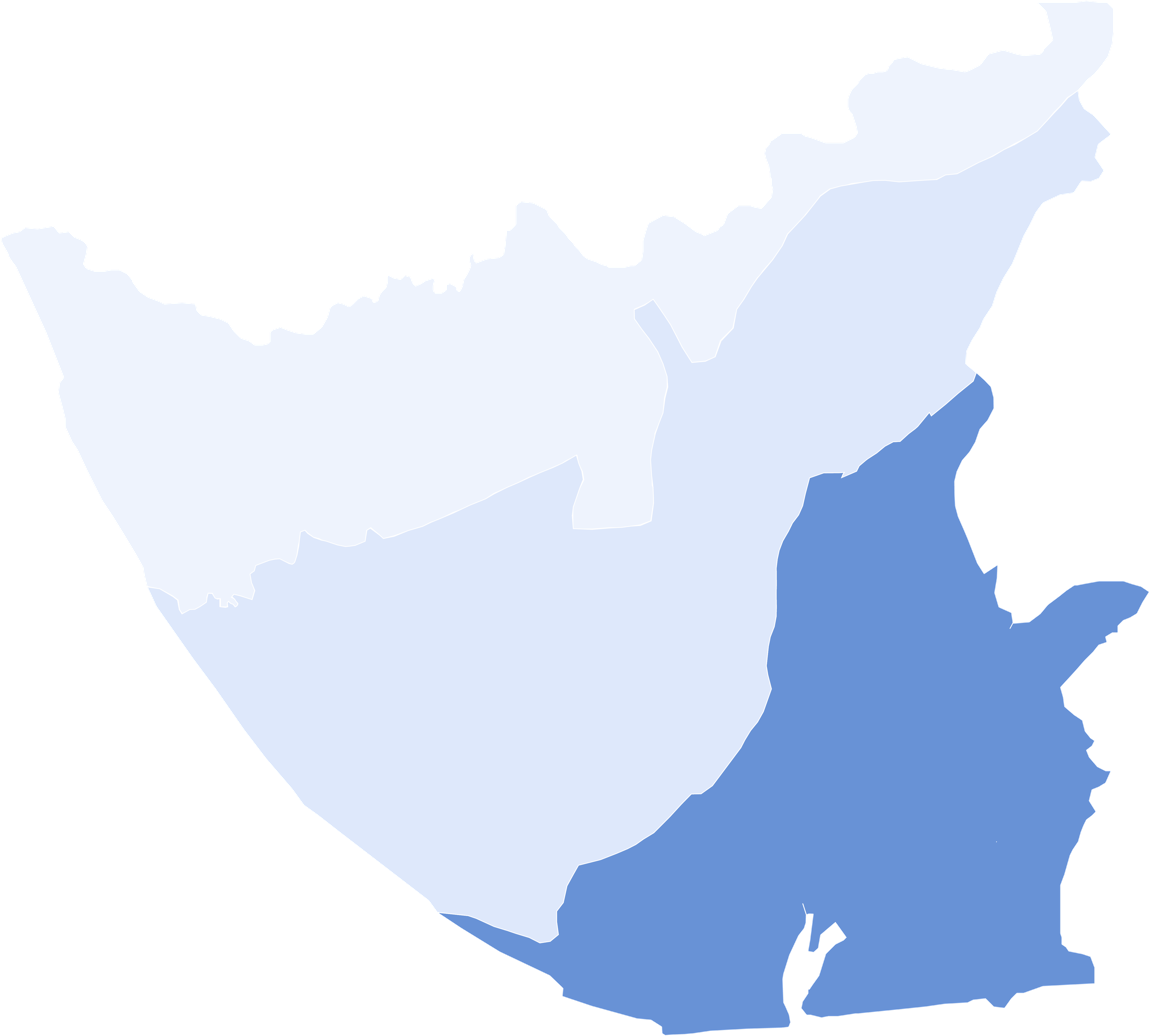
Sylva <30% 30–40% 60–70%

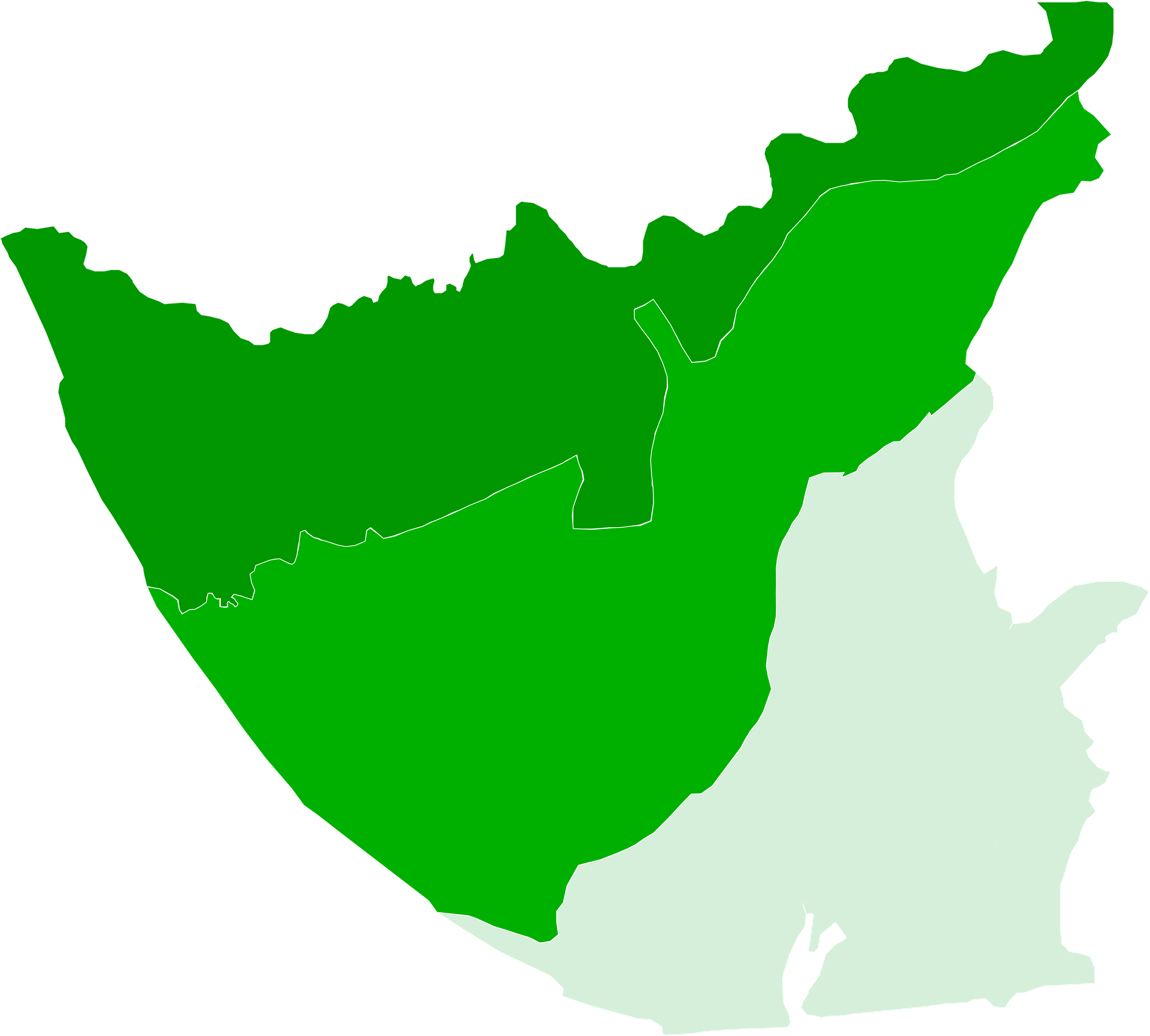
Diri; 30–40% 60–70% 70–80%

The results of the election by senatorial district.

Senatorial District	Timipre Sylva APC		Douye Diri PDP		Others		Total Valid Votes
Senatorial District	Votes	Percentage	Votes	Percentage	Votes	Percentage	Total Valid Votes
Bayelsa Central Senatorial District (Note: Comprising the local government areas of Kolokuma/Opokuma, Southern Ijaw, and Yenagoa.)	38,052	31.68%	80,927	67.37%	1,149	0.96%	120,128
Bayelsa East Senatorial District (Note: Comprising the local government areas of Brass, Ogbia, and Nembe.)	56,998	61.14%	35,593	38.18%	627	0.67%	93,218
Bayelsa West Senatorial District (Note: Comprising the local government areas of Ekeremor and Sagbama.)	15,053	20.28%	58,676	79.07%	479	0.65%	74,208
Totals	110,108	60.93%	175,196	38.29%	2,250	0.78%	287,554

==== By federal constituency ====
Percentage of the vote won by each major candidate by constituency.

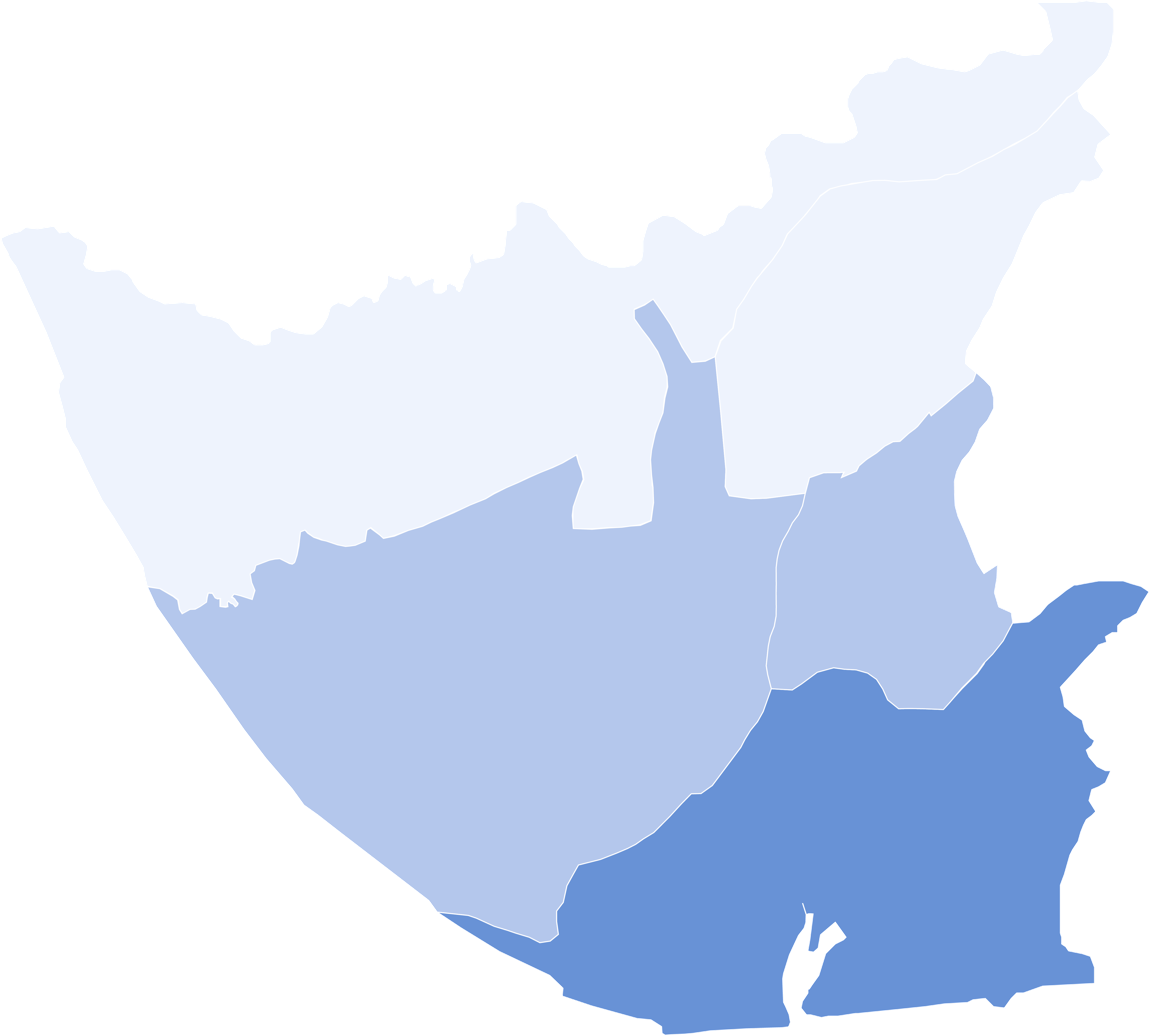
Sylva <30% 40–50% 60–70%

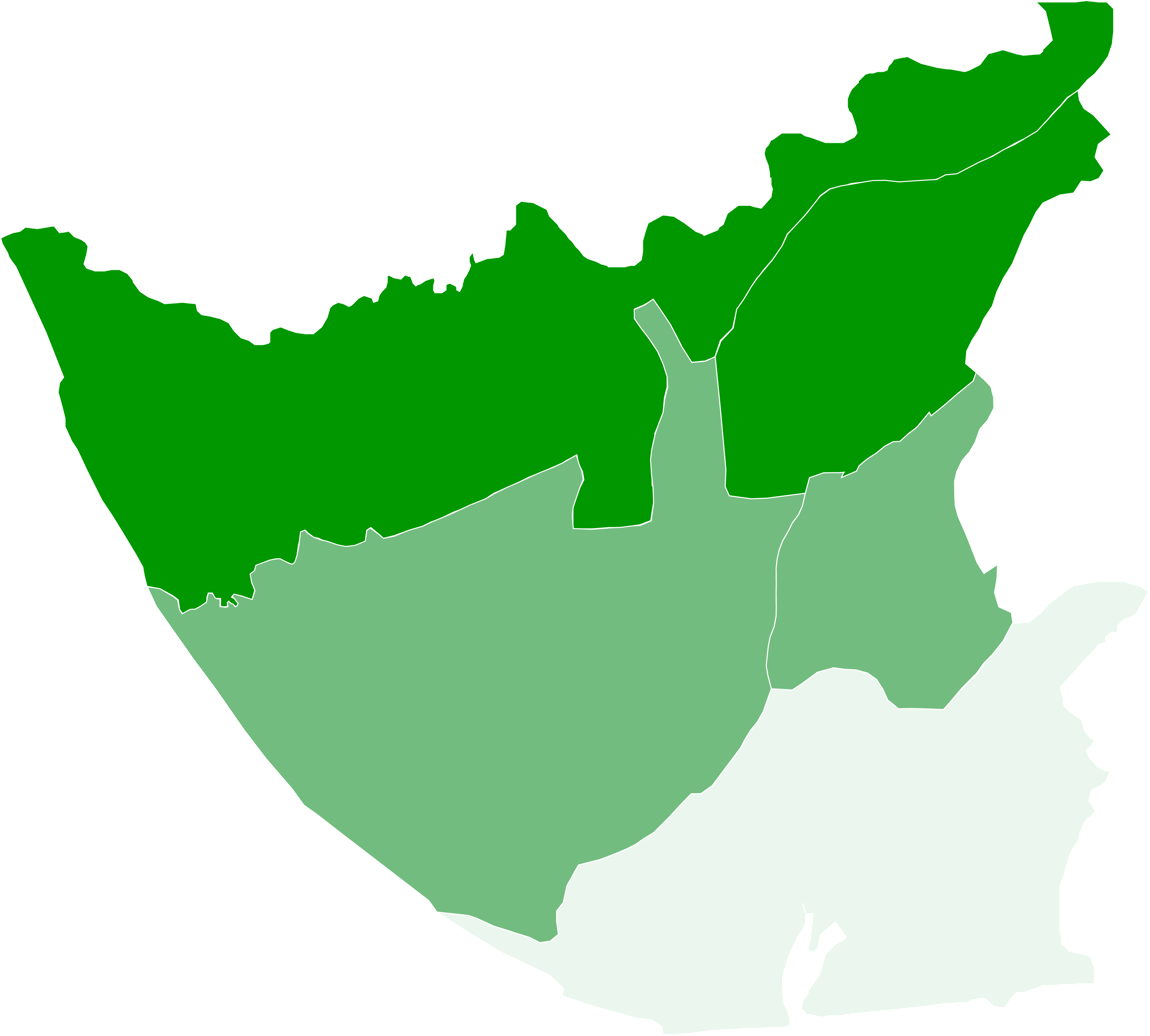
Diri <30% 50–60% 70–80%

The results of the election by federal constituency.

Federal Constituency	Timipre Sylva APC		Douye Diri PDP		Others		Total Valid Votes
Federal Constituency	Votes	Percentage	Votes	Percentage	Votes	Percentage	Total Valid Votes
Brass/Nembe Federal Constituency (Note: Comprising the local government areas of Brass and Nembe.)	40,679	69.84%	17,158	29.46%	410	0.70%	58,247
Ogbia Federal Constituency (Note: Comprising the local government area of Ogbia.)	16,319	46.66%	18,435	52.72%	217	0.62%	34,971
Sagbama/Ekeremor Federal Constituency (Note: Comprising the local government areas of Ekeremor and Sagbama.)	15,053	20.28%	58,676	79.07%	479	0.65%	74,208
Southern Ijaw Federal Constituency (Note: Comprising the local government area of Southern Ijaw.)	18,174	42.11%	24,685	57.20%	299	0.69%	43,158
Yenagoa/Kolokuna/Opokuma Federal Constituency (Note: Comprising the local government areas of Kolokuma/Opokuma and Yenagoa.)	19,878	25.83%	56,242	73.07%	850	1.10%	76,970
Totals	110,108	60.93%	175,196	38.29%	2,250	0.78%	287,554

==== By local government area ====
The results of the election by local government area.

LGA	Timipre Sylva APC		Douye Diri PDP		Others		Total Valid Votes	Turnout Percentage
LGA	Votes	Percentage	Votes	Percentage	Votes	Percentage	Total Valid Votes	Turnout Percentage
Brass	18,431	59.05%	12,602	40.38%	178	0.57%	31,211	34.10%
Ekeremor	8,445	26.61%	23,172	73.00%	124	0.39%	31,741	23.37%
Kolokuma/Opokuma	5,344	22.34%	18,465	77.20%	109	0.46%	23,918	36.98%
Nembe	22,248	82.29%	4,556	16.85%	232	0.86%	27,036	27.67%
Ogbia	16,319	46.66%	18,435	52.72%	217	0.62%	34,971	30.91%
Sagbama	6,608	15.56%	35,504	83.60%	355	0.84%	42,467	30.89%
Southern Ijaw	18,174	42.11%	24,685	57.20%	299	0.69%	43,158	27.20%
Yenagoa	14,534	27.40%	37,777	71.21%	741	1.40%	53,052	24.90%
Totals	110,108	60.93%	175,196	38.29%	2,250	0.78%	287,554	36.23%

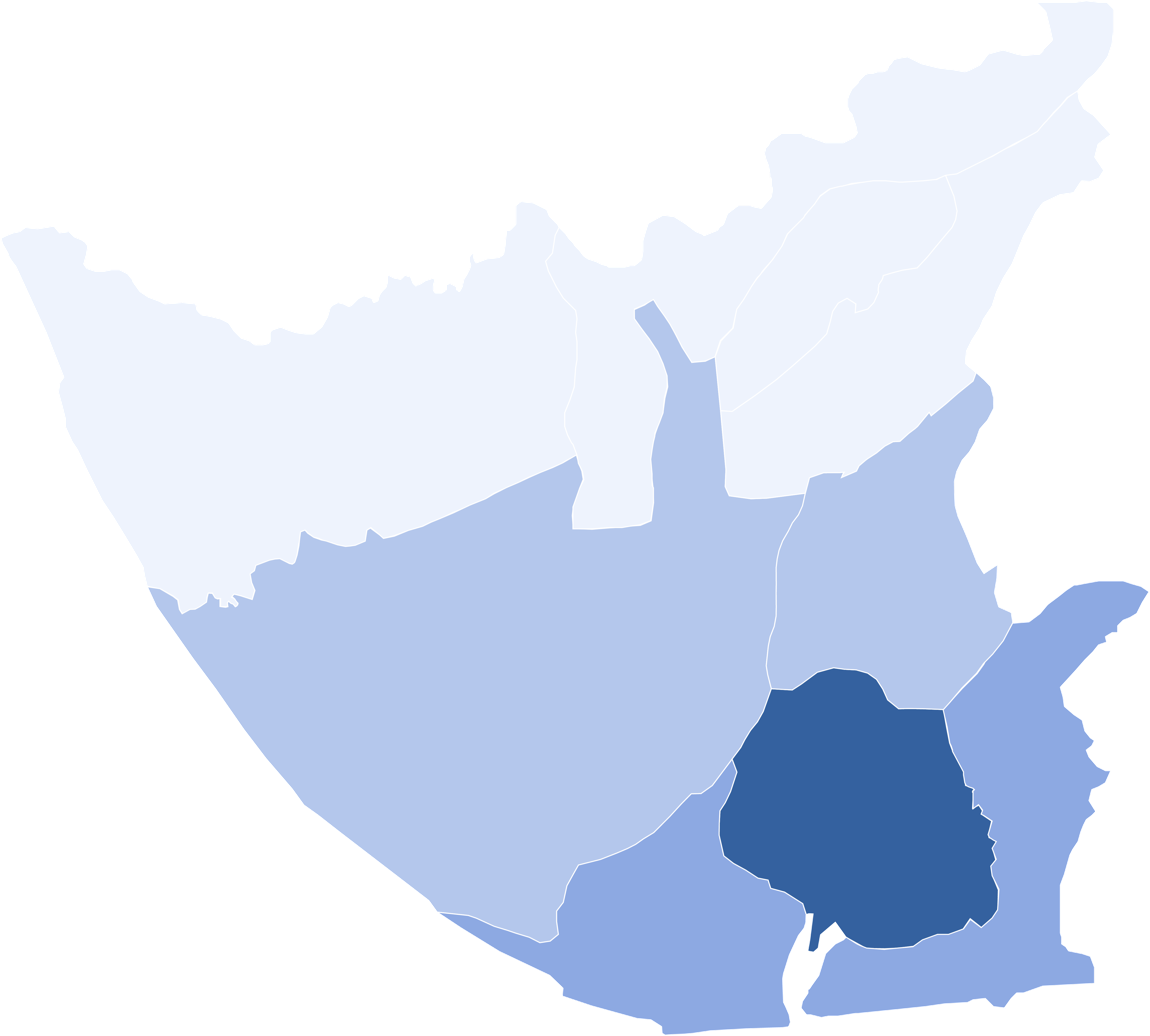
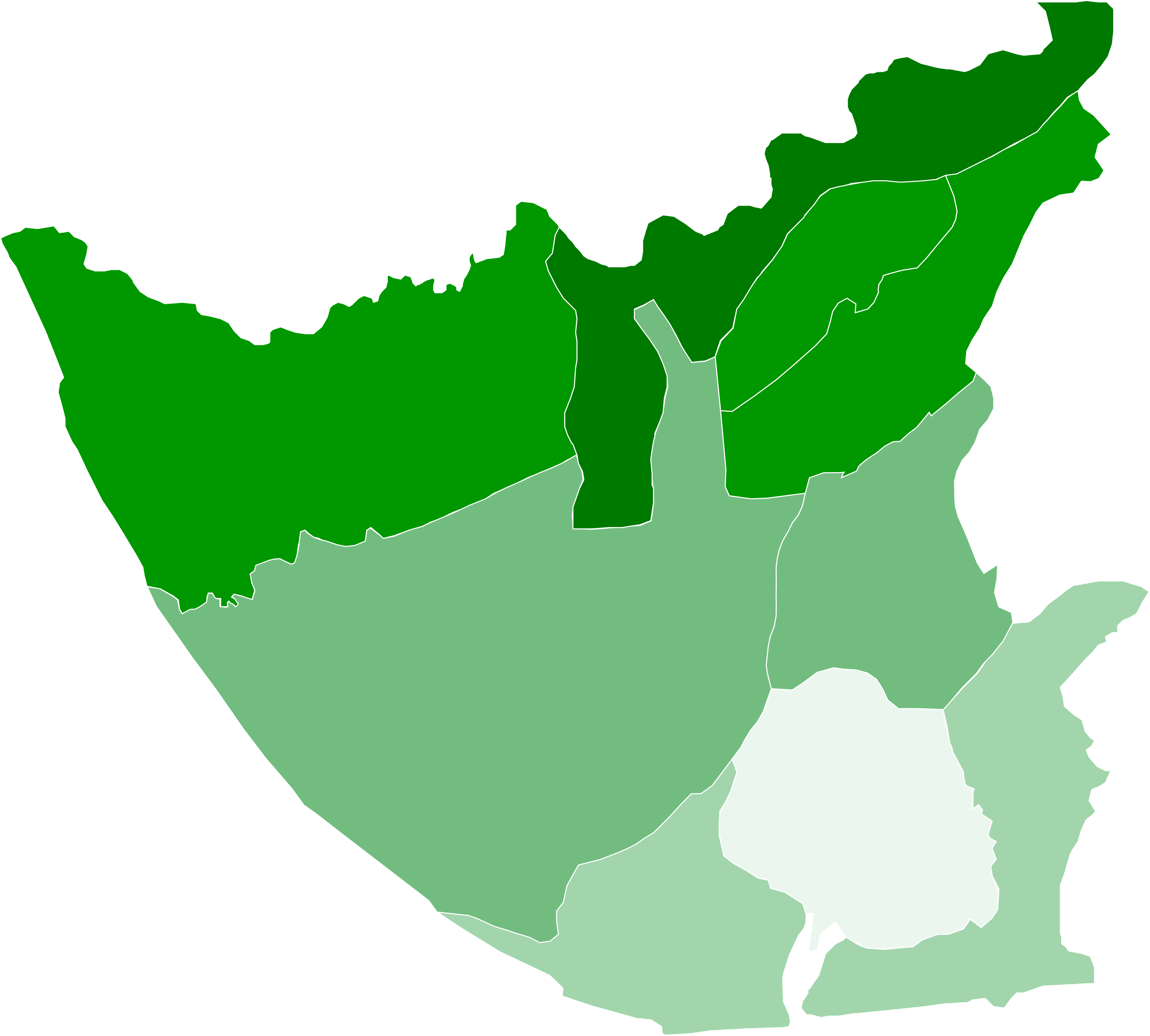
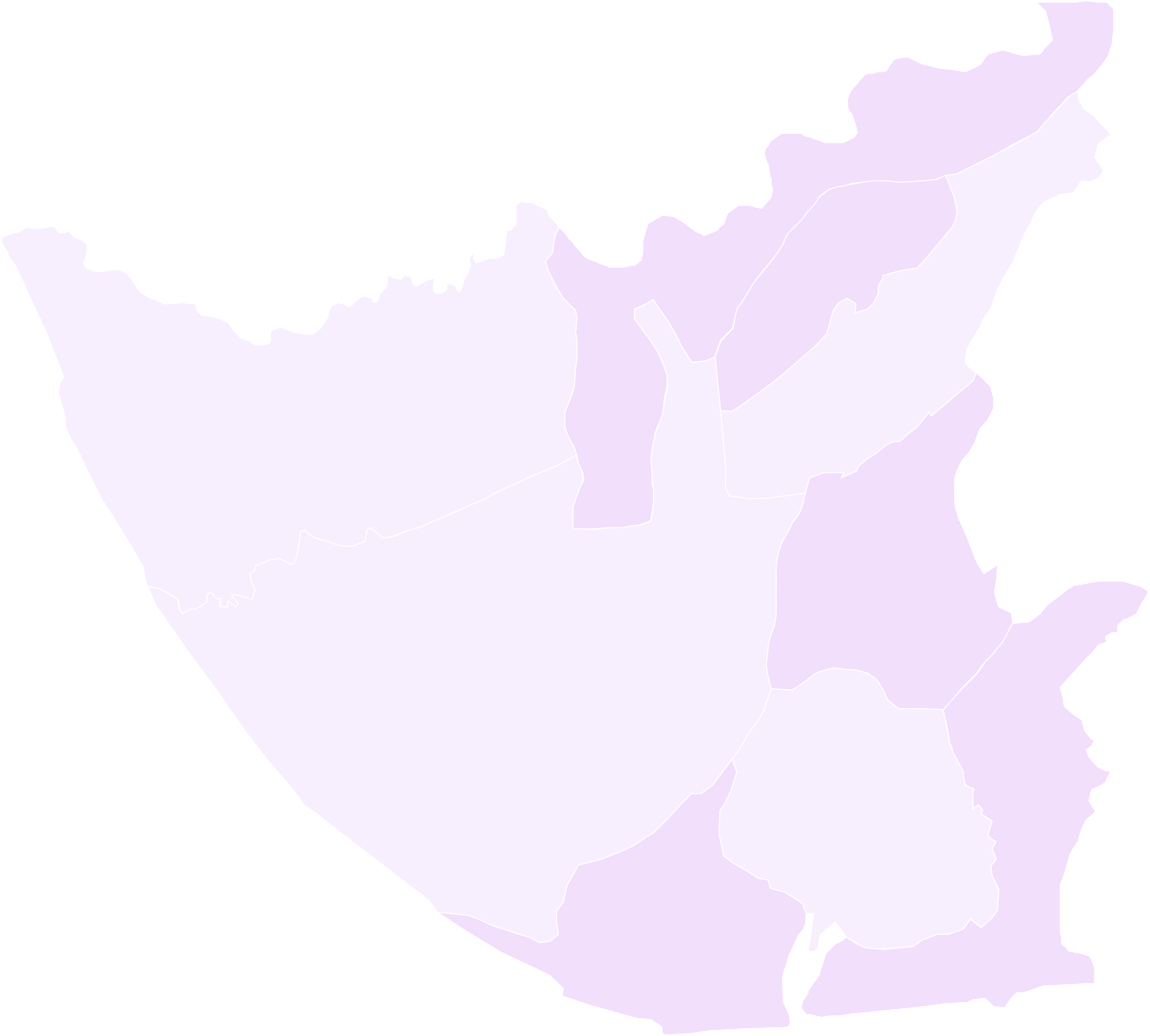
Percentage of the vote won by each major candidate by LGA.		Turnout Percentage by LGA
Sylva <30% 40–50% 50–60% 80–90%	Diri <30% 40–50% 50–60% 70–80% 80–90%	Turnout <30% 30–40%
