= 2023 Nigerian presidential election in Bayelsa State =

- 25 February 2023 (Note: Due to disruptions on Election Day, INEC postponed voting in 141 polling units to 26 February.)
- Opinion polls
- Registered: 1,056,862
- Turnout: 16.78%
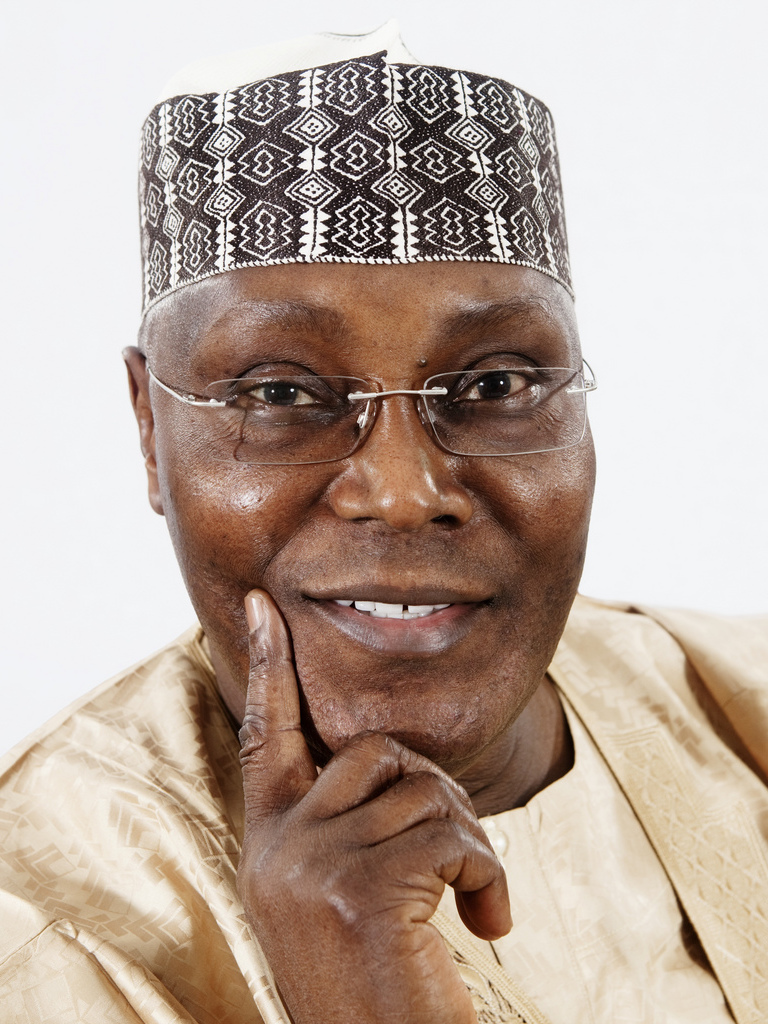

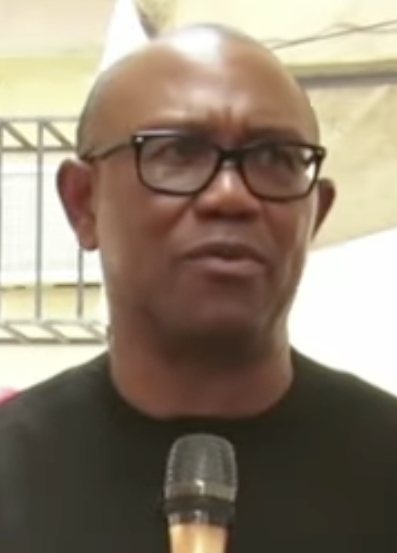

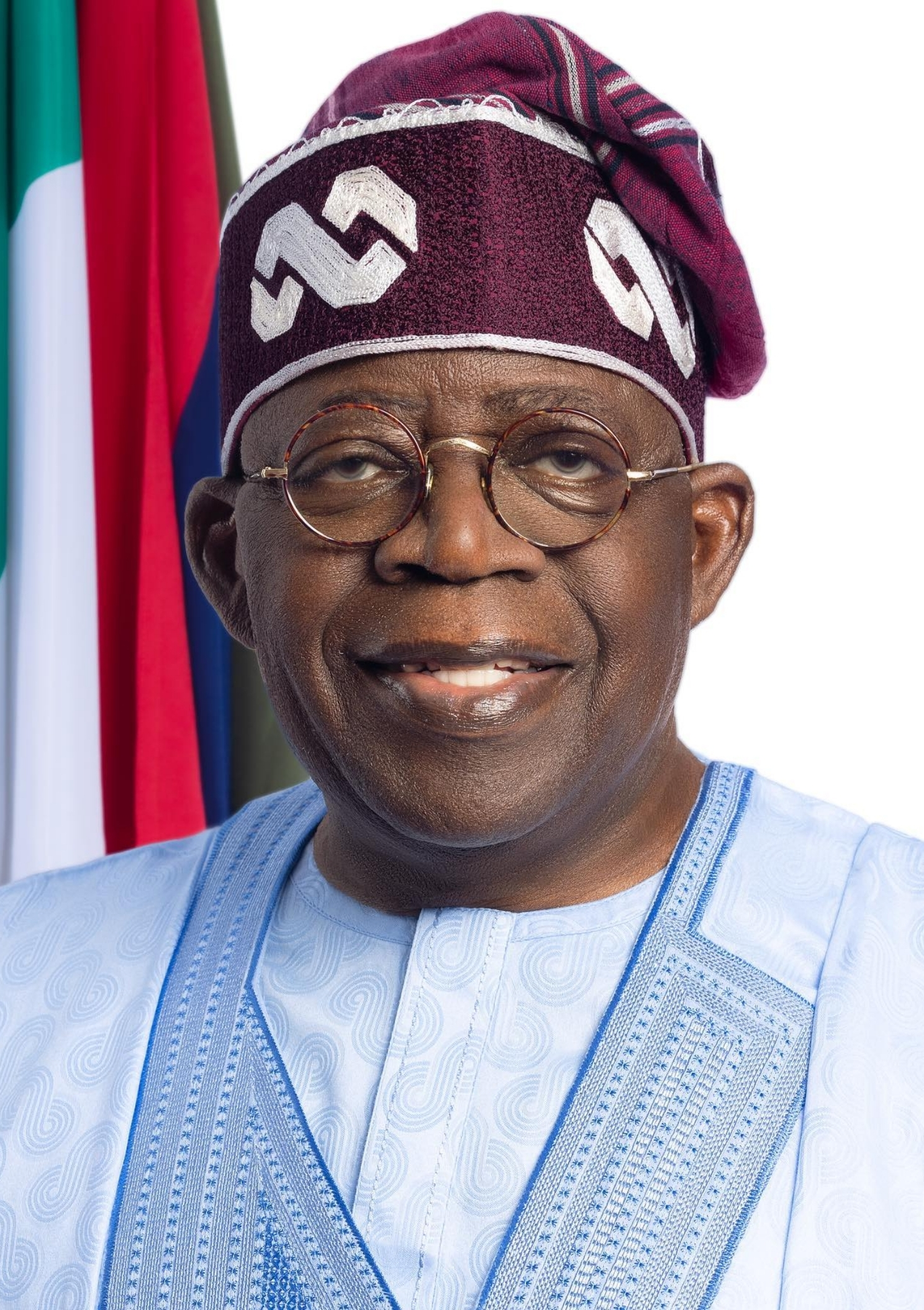
Nominee	Atiku Abubakar	Peter Obi	Bola Tinubu
Party	PDP	LP	APC
Home state	Adamawa	Anambra	Lagos
Running mate	Ifeanyi Okowa	Yusuf Datti Baba-Ahmed	Kashim Shettima
Popular vote	68,818	49,975	42,572
Percentage	41.63%	30.23%	25.75%
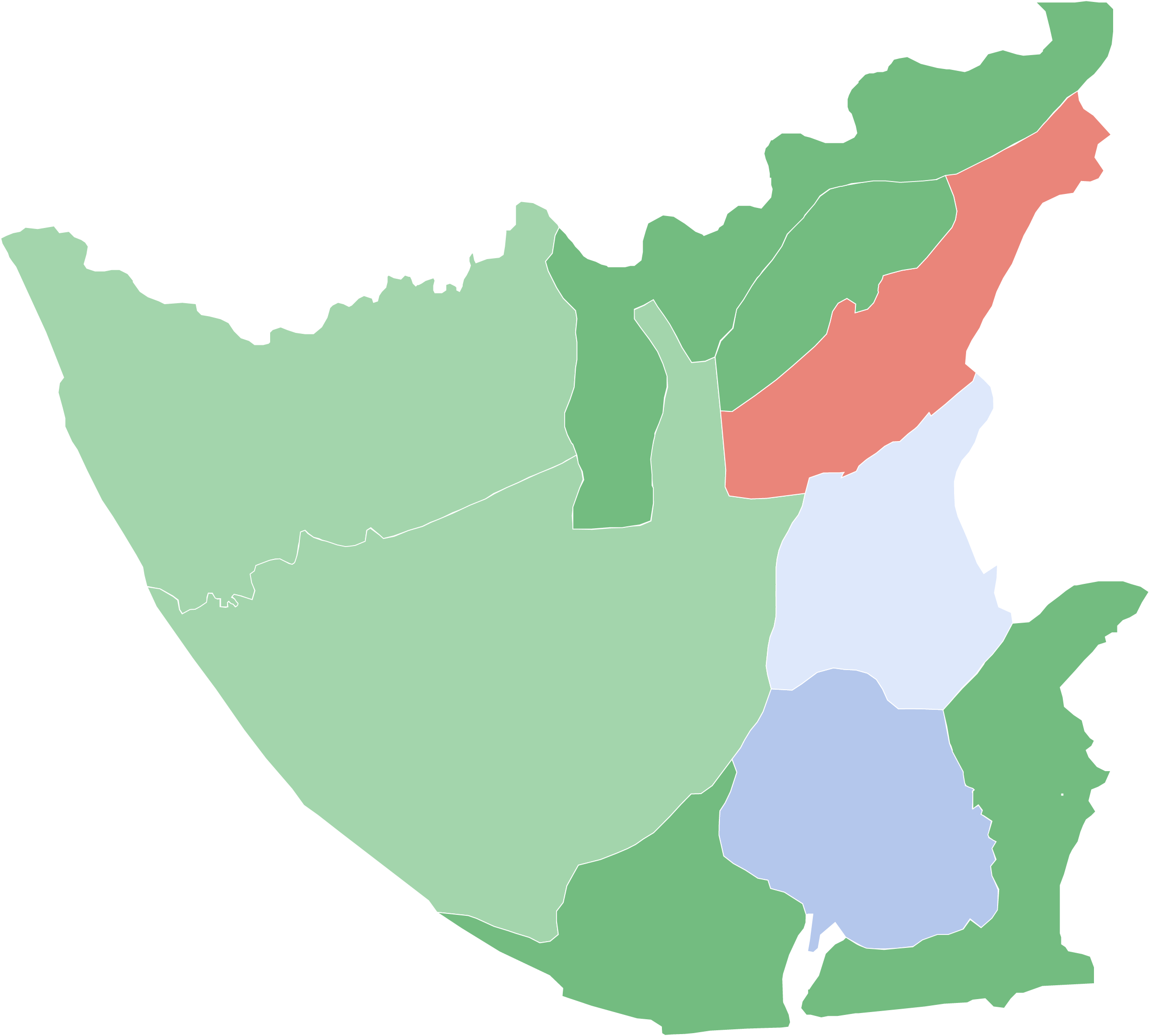
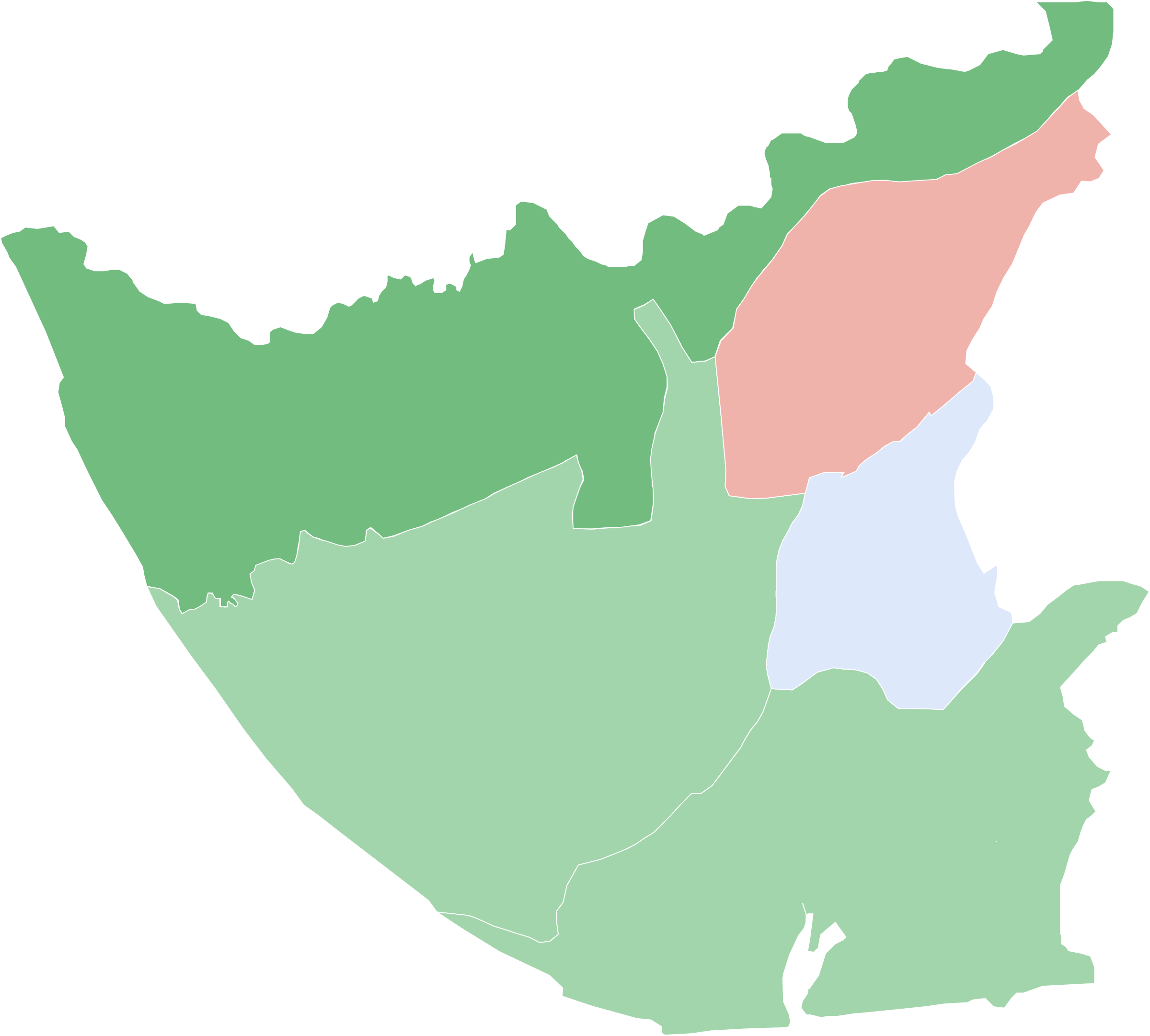
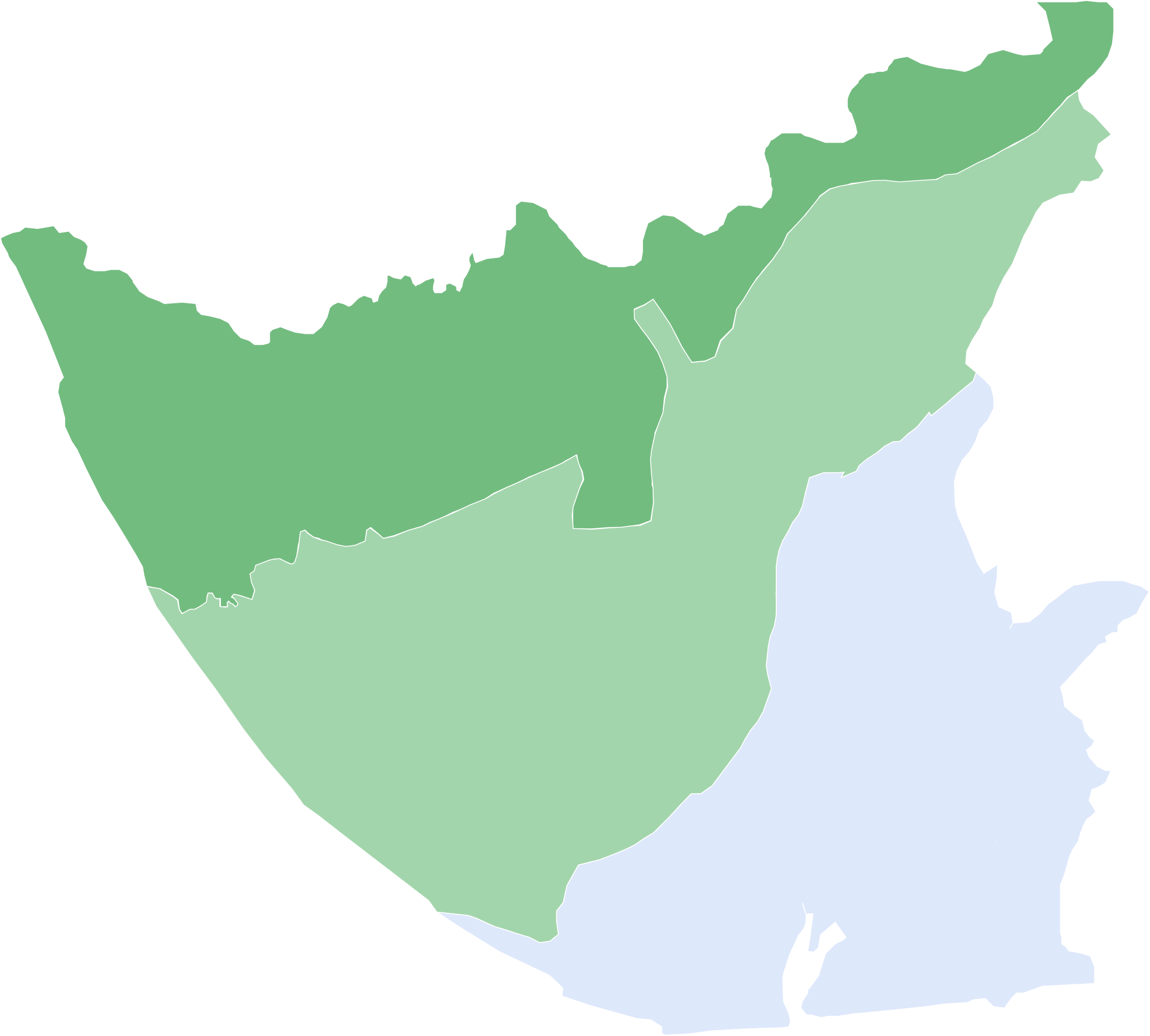
- LGA results Tinubu: 30–40% 40–50% Obi: 40–50% 50–60% Abubakar: 40–50% 50–60%
President before election
Muhammadu Buhari
APC
Elected President
Bola Tinubu
APC

The 2023 Nigerian presidential election in Bayelsa State will be held on 25 February 2023 as part of the nationwide 2023 Nigerian presidential election to elect the president and vice president of Nigeria. Other federal elections, including elections to the House of Representatives and the Senate, will also be held on the same date while state elections will be held two weeks afterward on 11 March.

== Background ==
Bayelsa State is a small state in the South South mainly populated by Ijaw peoples; although its oil reserves make it one of the most resource-rich states in the nation, Bayelsa has faced challenges in security and environmental degradation in large part due to years of systemic corruption and illegal oil bunkering.

Politically, the state's early 2019 elections were categorized as the continuation of the PDP's dominance albeit with the APC making considerable gains by gaining one senate and two House of Representatives seats. The APC also gained ground in the assembly election and Bayelsa also was the state that swung the most towards Buhari in the presidential election, although that could be chalked up to former Governor Goodluck Jonathan no longer being PDP nominee. Later in 2019, the swing towards the APC dramatically increased as its gubernatorial nominee David Lyon won by a large margin but Diri was declared victor after Lyon was disqualified before the inauguration.

== Polling ==
Polling organisation/client	Fieldwork date	Sample size					Others	Undecided	Undisclosed	Not voting
Polling organisation/client	Fieldwork date	Sample size	Tinubu APC	Obi LP	Kwankwaso NNPP	Abubakar PDP	Others	Undecided	Undisclosed	Not voting
BantuPage	January 2023	N/A	9%	27%	2%	13%	–	13%	20%	16%
Nextier (Bayelsa crosstabs of national poll)	27 January 2023	N/A	11.4%	62.9%	–	20.0%	–	5.7%	–	–
SBM Intelligence for EiE (Bayelsa crosstabs of national poll)	22 January-6 February 2023	N/A	9%	41%	–	47%	–	2%	–	–

== Projections ==
Source	Projection		As of
Africa Elects (Note: Africa Elects projections predict the likelihood of a candidate winning a state by categorizing a state as "Safe" for exceedingly likely, "Likely" for somewhat likely, and "Lean" for least likely. If no clear determination could be made, states are categorized as "tossups".)	Lean Obi		24 February 2023
Dataphyte (Note: Dataphyte projections predict candidates' projected votal shares in each state.)
Dataphyte	Tinubu:	20.87%	11 February 2023
Dataphyte	Obi:	45.03%	11 February 2023
Dataphyte	Abubakar:	28.05%	11 February 2023
Dataphyte	Others:	6.05%	11 February 2023
Enough is Enough- SBM Intelligence (Note: EiE-SBM projections predict which candidates will win states.)	Abubakar		17 February 2023
SBM Intelligence (Note: SBM projections predict which candidates will win states or, if no determination could be made, categorizes states as "Too close to call" (TCC).)	Abubakar		15 December 2022
ThisDay (Note: ThisDay projections predict candidates' projected votal shares in each state.)
ThisDay	Tinubu:	20%	27 December 2022
ThisDay	Obi:	30%	27 December 2022
ThisDay	Kwankwaso:	–	27 December 2022
ThisDay	Abubakar:	40%	27 December 2022
ThisDay	Others/Undecided:	10%	27 December 2022
The Nation (Note: SBM projections predict which candidates will win states or, if no determination could be made, categorizes states as "Battlegrounds.")	Abubakar		12-19 February 2023

== General election ==
=== Results ===
Candidate	Running mate	Party	Votes	%
Atiku Abubakar	Ifeanyi Okowa	PDP	68,818	41.63
Peter Obi	Yusuf Datti Baba-Ahmed	LP	49,975	30.23
Bola Tinubu	Kashim Shettima	APC	42,572	25.75
Rabiu Kwankwaso	Isaac Idahosa	NNPP	540	0.33
Other candidates	–	Others	3,420	2.07
Total			165,325	100.00
Valid votes			165,325	95.50
Invalid/blank votes			7,786	4.50
Total votes			177,368	–
Registered voters/turnout			1,056,862	16.78

==== By senatorial district ====
The results of the election by senatorial district.

Senatorial district	Bola Tinubu APC		Atiku Abubakar PDP		Peter Obi LP		Rabiu Kwankwaso NNPP		Others		Total valid votes
Senatorial district	Votes	%	Votes	%	Votes	%	Votes	%	Votes	%	Total valid votes
Bayelsa Central Senatorial District (Note: Comprising the local government areas of Kolokuma/Opokuma, Southern Ijaw, and Yenagoa.)	18,438	21.72%	34,560	40.70%	30,056	35.40%	413	0.49%	1,439	1.69%	84,906
Bayelsa East Senatorial District (Note: Comprising the local government areas of Brass, Ogbia, and Nembe.)	15,133	35.79%	14,905	35.26%	10,801	25.55%	87	0.21%	1,351	3.20%	42,277
Bayelsa West Senatorial District (Note: Comprising the local government areas of Ekeremor and Sagbama.)	9,001	23.60%	19,353	50.74%	9,118	23.91%	40	0.10%	630	1.65%	38,142
Totals	42,572	25.75%	68,818	41.62%	49,975	30.23%	540	0.33%	3,420	2.07%	165,325

==== By federal constituency ====
The results of the election by federal constituency.

Federal constituency	Bola Tinubu APC		Atiku Abubakar PDP		Peter Obi LP		Rabiu Kwankwaso NNPP		Others		Total valid votes
Federal constituency	Votes	%	Votes	%	Votes	%	Votes	%	Votes	%	Total valid votes
Brass/Nembe Federal Constituency (Note: Comprising the local government areas of Brass and Nembe.)	6,689	33.68%	8,543	43.02%	4,080	20.54%	40	0.20%	508	2.56%	19,860
Ogbia Federal Constituency (Note: Comprising the local government area of Ogbia.)	8,444	37.67%	6,362	28.38%	6,721	29.98%	47	0.21%	843	3.76%	22,417
Sagbama/Ekeremor Federal Constituency (Note: Comprising the local government areas of Ekeremor and Sagbama.)	9,001	23.60%	19,353	50.74%	9,118	23.91%	40	0.10%	630	1.65%	38,142
Southern Ijaw Federal Constituency (Note: Comprising the local government areas of Southern Ijaw.)	7,650	32.22%	11,280	47.51%	4,400	18.53%	190	0.80%	224	0.94%	23,744
Yenagoa/Kolokuna/Opokuma Federal Constituency (Note: Comprising the local government areas of Kolokuma/Opokuma and Yenagoa.)	10,788	17.64%	23,280	38.06%	25,656	41.95%	223	0.36%	1,215	1.99%	61,162
Totals	42,572	25.75%	68,818	41.62%	49,975	30.23%	540	0.33%	3,420	2.07%	165,325

==== By local government area ====
The results of the election by local government area.

Local government area	Bola Tinubu APC		Atiku Abubakar PDP		Peter Obi LP		Rabiu Kwankwaso NNPP		Others		Total valid votes	Turnout (%)
Local government area	Votes	%	Votes	%	Votes	%	Votes	%	Votes	%	Total valid votes	Turnout (%)
Brass	3,684	29.70%	6,209	50.06%	2,273	18.32%	25	0.20%	213	1.72%	12,404	13.86%
Ekeremor	4,398	24.00%	9,113	49.73%	4,489	24.49%	16	0.09%	310	1.69%	18,326	13.71%
Kolokuma/Opokuma	4,137	24.63%	8,972	53.42%	3,395	20.21%	34	0.20%	259	1.54%	16,797	26.65%
Nembe	3,005	40.30%	2,334	31.30%	1,807	24.24%	15	0.20%	295	3.96%	7,456	7.81%
Ogbia	8,444	37.67%	6,362	28.38%	6,721	29.98%	47	0.21%	843	3.76%	22,417	20.89%
Sagbama	4,603	23.23%	10,240	51.68%	4,629	23.36%	24	0.12%	320	1.61%	19,816	17.13%
Southern Ijaw	7,650	32.22%	11,280	47.51%	4,400	18.53%	190	0.80%	224	0.94%	23,744	13.50%
Yenagoa	6,651	14.99%	14,308	32.25%	22,261	50.18%	189	0.43%	956	2.15%	44,365	21.41%
Totals	42,572	25.75%	68,818	41.62%	49,975	30.23%	540	0.33%	3,420	2.07%	165,325	16.38%

== See also ==
- 2023 Bayelsa State elections
- 2023 Nigerian presidential election
