= 2015 Nigerian Senate elections in Bayelsa State =

The 2015 Nigerian Senate election in Bayelsa State was held on March 28, 2015, to elect members of the Nigerian Senate to represent Bayelsa State. Foster Ogola representing Bayelsa West, Ben Murray-Bruce representing Bayelsa East and: Emmanuel Paulker representing Bayelsa Central all won on the platform of the People's Democratic Party.

== Overview ==
Affiliation	Party		Total
Affiliation	APC	PDP	Total
Before Election	0	3	3
After Election	0	3	3

== Summary ==
District	Incumbent	Party	Elected Senator	Party
Bayelsa Central	Emmanuel Paulker	PDP	Emmanuel Paulker	PDP
Bayelsa West	Heineken Lokpobiri	PDP	Foster Ogala	PDP
Bayelsa East	Clever Ikisikpo	PDP	Ben Murray-Bruce	PDP

== Results ==
=== Bayelsa Central ===
People's Democratic Party candidate Emmanuel Paulker won the election, defeating All Progressives Congress candidate Aganaba Steven and other party candidates.

2015 Nigerian Senate election in Bayelsa State
Party	Candidate	Votes	%
PDP	Emmanuel Paulker		
APC	Aganaba Steven		
Total votes			
PDP hold			

=== Bayelsa West ===
People's Democratic Party candidate Foster Ogola won the election, defeating All Progressives Congress candidate Eddi Julius and other party candidates.

2015 Nigerian Senate election in Bayelsa State
Party	Candidate	Votes	%
PDP	Foster Ogola		
APC	Eddi Julius		
Total votes			
PDP hold			

=== Bayelsa East ===
People's Democratic Party candidate Ben Murray-Bruce won the election, defeating All Progressives Congress candidate Timipre Sylva and other party candidates.

2015 Nigerian Senate election in Bayelsa State
Party	Candidate	Votes	%
PDP	Ben Murray-Bruce		
APC	Timipre Sylva		
Total votes			
PDP hold			
