= Nigerian senators of the 9th National Assembly =

Senators of the 9th National Assembly of Nigeria

Senate composition by party: APC / PDP / NNPP / YPP / APGA / LP / SDP / Vacant

The table below shows the list of Nigerian senators of the 9th National Assembly. The Senate includes three senators from each of the 36 states, plus one senator for the Federal Capital Territory. The Senate president is the head of the house, and assisted by the deputy Senate president. The Senate president and his deputy also work with the principal officers in the house including the majority leader, deputy majority leader, minority leader, deputy minority leader, chief whip, deputy chief whip, minority whip and deputy minority whip.

== Principal officers ==
=== Presiding officers ===
Office	Party	Senator	District	Since
Senate President	APC	Ahmad Lawan	Yobe North	11 June 2019
Deputy Senate President	APC	Ovie Omo-Agege	Delta Central	11 June 2019

=== Majority leadership ===
Office	Party	Senator	District	Since
Senate Majority Leader	APC	Abdullahi Ibrahim Gobir (Note: In July 2019, Kebbi North Senator Yahaya Abubakar Abdullahi became Majority Leader, however, Abdullahi resigned after defecting to the PDP in June 2022. APC leadership chose Gobir as his replacement.)	Sokoto East	27 July 2022
Deputy Senate Majority Leader	APC	Robert Ajayi Boroffice	Ondo North	2 July 2019
Senate Majority Whip	APC	Orji Uzor Kalu	Abia North	2 July 2019
Deputy Senate Majority Whip	APC	Aliyu Sabi Abdullahi	Niger North	2 July 2019

=== Minority leadership ===
Office	Party	Senator	District	Since
Senate Minority Leader	PDP	Philips Tanimu Aduda (Note: In July 2019, Abia South Senator Enyinnaya Abaribe became Majority Leader; however, Abaribe resigned after defecting to APGA in May 2022. The next month, PDP leadership chose Aduda as his replacement.)	FCT	21 June 2022
Deputy Senate Minority Leader	PDP	Shuaibu Isa Lau (Note: In July 2015, Taraba South Senator Emmanuel Bwacha became Deputy Minority Leader; however, Bwacha resigned after switching to the APC in February 2022. PDP leadership chose Lau as his replacement.)	Taraba North	8 February 2022
Senate Minority Whip	PDP	Utazi Chukwuka (Note: In July 2015, FCT Senator Philips Tanimu Aduda became Minority Whip; however, Aduda was nominated as Minority Leader in June 2022. At the same time, PDP leadership chose Chukwuka as his replacement.)	Enugu North	21 June 2022
Deputy Senate Minority Whip	PDP	Danjuma Laah (Note: In July 2019, Zamfara North Senator Sahabi Yaú became Deputy Minority Whip, however, Yaú resigned before switching to the APC in June 2021. PDP leadership chose Sokoto South Senator Ibrahim Abdullahi Danbaba as his replacement. However, Abdullahi Danbaba defected too, in April 2022, so PDP leadership chose Kaduna South Senator Danjuma Laah for the position.)	Kaduna South	11 May 2022

== Membership by zone ==
As of 14 November 2022:

Zone	APC	PDP	NNPP	YPP	APGA	LP	SDP	Vacant	Total	States included
North-Central	9	5	0	0	0	0	1	1	16	BE, FCT, KO, KW, NA, PL
North-East	12	3	2	0	0	0	0	1	18	AD, BA, BO, GO, TA, YO
North-West	15	5	0	0	0	0	0	1	21	JI, KD, KN, KT, KE, SO, ZA
South-East	3	9	0	1	1	1	0	0	15	AB, AN, EB, EN, IM
South-South	3	14	0	1	0	0	0	0	18	AK, BY, CR, DE, ED, RI
South-West	17	4	0	0	0	0	0	0	21	EK, LA, OG, ON, OS, OY
Total	59	40	2	2	1	1	1	3	109	

== Changes ==
Changes in seats held (2019–2023)
Seat	Before				Change		
Seat	Date	Member	Party	Reason	Date	Member	Party
Imo West	11 June 2019	Vacant		Alleged forced election declaration	13 June 2019	Rochas Okorocha	APC
Imo North	11 June 2019	Vacant		Alleged election irregularities	26 July 2019	Benjamin Uwajumogu	APC
Niger East	14 June 2019	David Umaru	APC	Court awarded primary election win to opponent	2 July 2019	Sani Musa	APC
Kogi West	23 August 2019	Dino Melaye	PDP	Court annulled general election; opponent won re-run	4 December 2019	Smart Adeyemi	APC
Sokoto South	30 October 2019	Abubakar Shehu Tambuwal	APC	Court awarded general election win to opponent	19 November 2019	Ibrahim Abdullahi Danbaba	PDP
Ekiti South	6 November 2019	Adebayo Clement Adeyeye	APC	Court awarded general election win to opponent	14 November 2019	Abiodun Olujimi	PDP
Akwa Ibom North-West	9 November 2019	Chris Ekpenyong	PDP	Court partially annulled general election; sacked senator won supplementary election	30 January 2020	Chris Ekpenyong	PDP
Imo North	18 December 2019	Benjamin Uwajumogu	APC	Died	27 April 2021	Frank Ibezim	APC
Plateau South	10 February 2020	Ignatius Datong Longjan	APC	Died	15 December 2020	Nora Daduut	APC
Bayelsa Central	14 February 2020	Douye Diri	PDP	Member elected Bayelsa Governor	15 December 2020	Moses Cleopas	PDP
Bayelsa West	14 February 2020	Lawrence Ewhrudjakpo	PDP	Member elected Bayelsa Deputy Governor	15 December 2020	Henry Seriake Dickson	PDP
Cross River North	23 March 2020	Rose Okoji Oko	PDP	Died	16 December 2020	Stephen Odey (Note: The PDP's Stephen Odey and Agom Jarigbe fought in court over the by-election's PDP nomination; Odey won both initial court decisions and the by-election before taking office late in December 2020. However, Jarigbe later won several court challenges which declared him the legitimate PDP nominee and thus Senator. Jarigbe took office in September 2021.)	PDP
Lagos East	15 June 2020	Adebayo Osinowo	APC	Died	15 December 2020	Tokunbo Abiru	APC
Adamawa North	25 November 2020	Ishaku Elisha Abbo	PDP	Party switch			APC
Delta North	25 June 2021	Peter Nwaoboshi	PDP	Party switch			APC
Zamfara Central	29 June 2021	Hassan Muhammed Gusau	PDP	Party switch			APC
Zamfara North	29 June 2021	Sahabi Alhaji Yaú	PDP	Party switch			APC
Zamfara West	29 June 2021	Lawali Hassan Anka	PDP	Party switch			APC
Cross River North	30 July 2021	Stephen Odey	PDP	Court awarded primary election win to opponent	15 September 2021	Agom Jarigbe	PDP
Anambra North	26 August 2021	Stella Oduah	PDP	Party switch			APC
Taraba South	3 February 2022	Emmanuel Bwacha	PDP	Party switch			APC
Zamfara Central	23 February 2022	Hassan Muhammed Gusau	APC	Member appointed Zamfara Deputy Governor	Vacant		
Borno North	12 April 2022	Abubakar Kyari	APC	Resigned	Vacant		
Nasarawa West	12 April 2022	Abdullahi Adamu	APC	Resigned	Vacant		
Katsina North	20 April 2022	Ahmad Babba Kaita	APC	Party switch			PDP
Sokoto South	27 April 2022	Ibrahim Abdullahi Danbaba	PDP	Party switch			APC
Anambra North	28 April 2022	Stella Oduah	APC	Party switch			PDP
Oyo South	6 May 2022	Mohammed Kola Balogun	PDP	Party switch			APC
Kano Central	18 May 2022	Ibrahim Shekarau	APC	Party switch			NNPP
Abia South	27 May 2022	Enyinnaya Abaribe	PDP	Party switch			APGA
Kebbi Central	28 May 2022	Adamu Aliero	APC	Party switch			PDP
Bauchi South	31 May 2022	Lawal Yahaya Gumau	APC	Party switch			NNPP
Edo North	3 June 2022	Francis Alimikhena	APC	Party switch			PDP
Kebbi North	8 June 2022	Yahaya Abubakar Abdullahi	APC	Party switch			PDP
Bauchi Central	19 June 2022	Halliru Dauda Jika	APC	Party switch			NNPP
Imo East	21 June 2022	Ezenwa Francis Onyewuchi	PDP	Party switch			LP
Nasarawa North	1 July 2022	Godiya Akwashiki	APC	Party switch			SDP
Akwa Ibom North-East	15 July 2022	Bassey Albert Akpan	PDP	Party switch			YPP
Kano Central	29 August 2022	Ibrahim Shekarau	NNPP	Party switch			PDP
Bauchi North	9 November 2022	Adamu Muhammad Bulkachuwa	APC	Party switch			PDP

== See also ==
- Nigerian Senate
