= 2019 Nigerian Senate elections in Bayelsa State =

The 2019 Nigerian Senate election in Bayelsa State was held on February 23, 2019, to elect members of the Nigerian Senate to represent Bayelsa State. Douye Diri representing Bayelsa Central, and Lawrence Ewhrudjakpo representing Bayelsa West both won on the platform of the People's Democratic Party (Nigeria), while Biobarakuma Degi representing Bayelsa East won on the platform of All Progressives Congress.

== Overview ==
| Affiliation | Party | | Total |
| Affiliation | APC | PDP | Total |
|---|---|---|---|
| Before Election | 0 | 3 | 3 |
| After Election | 1 | 2 | 3 |

== Summary ==
| District | Incumbent | Party | Elected Senator | Party |
|---|---|---|---|---|
| Bayelsa Central | Emmanuel Paulker | PDP | Douye Diri | PDP |
| Bayelsa West | Foster Ogola | PDP | Lawrence Ewhrudjakpo | PDP |
| Bayelsa East | Ben Murray-Bruce | PDP | Biobarakuma Degi | APC |

== Results ==
=== Bayelsa Central ===
A total of 14 candidates registered with the Independent National Electoral Commission to contest in the election. PDP candidate Douye Diri won the election, defeating APC candidate Festus Sunday Daumiebi and 12 other party candidates. Douye received 53.88% of the votes, while Daumiebi received 45.55%.

2019 Nigerian Senate election in Bayelsa State
| Party | Candidate | Votes | % |
|---|---|---|---|
| PDP | Douye Diri | 83,978 | 53.88% |
| APC | Festus Daumiebi | 70,998 | 45.55% |
| Others | | 898 | 0.58% |
| Total votes | | 155,874 | 100% |
| PDP hold | | | |

=== Bayelsa West ===
A total of 16 candidates registered with the Independent National Electoral Commission to contest in the election. PDP candidate Lawrence Ewhrudjakpo won the election, defeating APC candidate Matthew Ado Karimo and 14 other party candidates. Ewhrudjakpo received 70.92% of the votes, while Karimo received 28.73%.

2019 Nigerian Senate election in Bayelsa State
| Party | Candidate | Votes | % |
|---|---|---|---|
| PDP | Lawrence Ewhrudjakpo | 49,912 | 70.92% |
| APC | Matthew Karimo | 20,219 | 28.73% |
| Others | | 246 | 0.35% |
| Total votes | | 70,377 | 100% |
| PDP hold | | | |

=== Bayelsa East ===
A total of 16 candidates registered with the Independent National Electoral Commission to contest in the election. APC candidate Biobarakuma Degi won the election, defeating PDP candidate Ipigansi Blessing Izagara and 12 other party candidates. Biobarakuma Degi received 45.71% of the votes, while Izagara received 34.16%.

2019 Nigerian Senate election in Bayelsa State
| Party | Candidate | Votes | % |
|---|---|---|---|
| APC | Biobarakuma Degi | 43,303 | 45.71% |
| PDP | Ipigansi Izagara | 32,363 | 34.16% |
| Others | | 19,068 | 20.13% |
| Total votes | | 94,734 | 100% |
| APC hold | | | |

== Bye-Elections ==
On 13 February 2020, the Supreme Court of Nigeria invalidated the results of the 2019 Bayelsa State gubernatorial elections on the grounds that the running mate of the actual winner of the election, David Lyon, submitted a fake certificate to the Independent National Electoral Commission. The court ordered Douye Diri to be issued a certificate of return, and installed governor with Lawrence Ewhrudjakpo as his deputy. This development left the Senatorial seats in Bayelsa West and Bayelsa Central vacant. A bye-election was conducted on December 5, 2019, ushering in Cleopas Moses representing Bayelsa Central and Seriake Dickson representing Bayelsa West both on the platform of People's Democratic Party
