= Ogola (surname) =

Ogola is a surname, and may refer to:

- Margaret Ogola (1958–2011), Kenyan novelist
- Brian Ogola (born 1989), Kenyan actor
- Foster Ogola, Nigerian politician
- Francis Ogola (born 1973), Ugandan sprinter
