= Benson Sunday Agadaga =

Nigerian senator from Bayelsa East Senatorial District

- Born: Bayelsa
- Occupation: Nigerian politician
- Notable work: He served as Special Adviser on Establishment in the government of Governor, Seriake Dickson.
- Political party: People Democratic party

Benson Sunday Agadaga (born 12 June 1956) is a Nigerian politician and a senator from Bayelsa East Senatorial District.

== Background ==
Benson Sunday Agadaga, born on July 12, 1956, in Bayelsa State, hails from the Urohobo tribe. His father, Chief Sunday Ebenezer Agadage, and mother, Mrs. Virginia Erenimugha Agadage.Benson Agadaga is wedded to Mrs. Regina Apuega Agadage.

== Educational career ==
Benson Sunday Agadaga Started his educational journey at ST. Luke School in Ologoghe, where he completed his primary education from 1960 to 1967. Secondary education at ST. Michael High School in Oloibiri, academic years 1969 to 1970.

He attended Rivers State College of Education in Port Harcourt from 1976 to 1979. Benson continued his academic career at Ahmadu Bello University in Zaria from 1981 to 1983. In the years 1998 to 2000, he furthered his studies at the University of Calabar, followed by enrollment at the Federal University of Technology in Owerri from 2000 to 2004. Benson received Master of Business Administratiom (MBA) post graduate diploma in Human Resources in 2006.

== Achievement ==
Benson Agadage held the position of principal at C.S.S Kolo from 1988 to 1993. He served as the principal at G.G.S Ukubie from 1995 to 1996. He assumed the role of principal at C.S.S Zarama from 1996 to 1998.

== Political career ==
He served as Special Adviser on Establishment in the government of Governor, Seriake Dickson of Bayelsa State. In 2019, he declared his intention to run for the governor of Bayelsa State but later drop his ambition. Agadaga was appointed a chief of staff to the governor of Bayelsa State, Douye Diri on 20 February 2020 and served till 2022 when he resigned his appointment to run for the Bayelsa East Senatorial District seat. He won the People's Democratic Party's, PDP nomination with 67 votes defeating Rex Jude Ogbuku who scored 41 votes and Nyenami Odual who received only two delegate votes.

In the February 25, 2023 Senate election, Agadaga polled 22,517 defeated the incumbent senator Fremieyo Degi of the All-Progressives Congress, APC.
