= A CommonSense Revolution =

Book written Ben Murray-Bruce

- Front cover
- Author: Ben Murray-Bruce
- Language: English
- Published: February 19, 2016
- Publisher: Ezekiel Press
- Publication place: Nigeria
- Media type: Print
- ISBN: 978-0-9968715-9-4 (Paperback)

A CommonSense Revolution is a book written by Ben Murray-Bruce, a Nigerian businessman and politician.

== Background ==
Reviewed by Michael Moszynski, A CommonSense Revolution was published and presented on February 19, 2016 at Eko Hotels and Suites.

== Criticism ==
Upon its release, the book was met with different reactions among critics. Igboeli Arinze of Leadership Newspaper criticized the motive of the book stating that "the trouble with Bruce’s Common Sense Revolution is that one cannot discern whether it is a publicity drive or a genuine cause to salvage Nigeria".
