= Okah =

Okah is a surname. Notable people with the surname include:

- Adaobi Okah (fl. 2023), Nigerian footballer
- Charles Okah (fl. 2010–2019), Nigerian terrorist, brother of Henry Okah
- Emmanuel Okah (fl. 2015), Nigerian lawyer and politician
- Henry Okah (born 1965), Nigerian presumed guerrilla leader, brother of Charles Okah
- Judith Okah (born 2006), Nigerian footballer
- Julie Okah-Donli (born 1966), Nigerian lawyer, chartered secretary and administrator, Director General of the National Agency for the Prohibition of Trafficking in Persons
