= Konbowei Benson =

Nigerian politician (born 1962)

Konbowei Friday Benson (born 3 February 1962) is a Nigerian politician and senator representing Bayelsa Central Senatorial District under the Platform of the Peoples Democratic Party (PDP).
