= Edumanom Forest Reserve =

Nigerian Forest Reserve

- Forest reserve
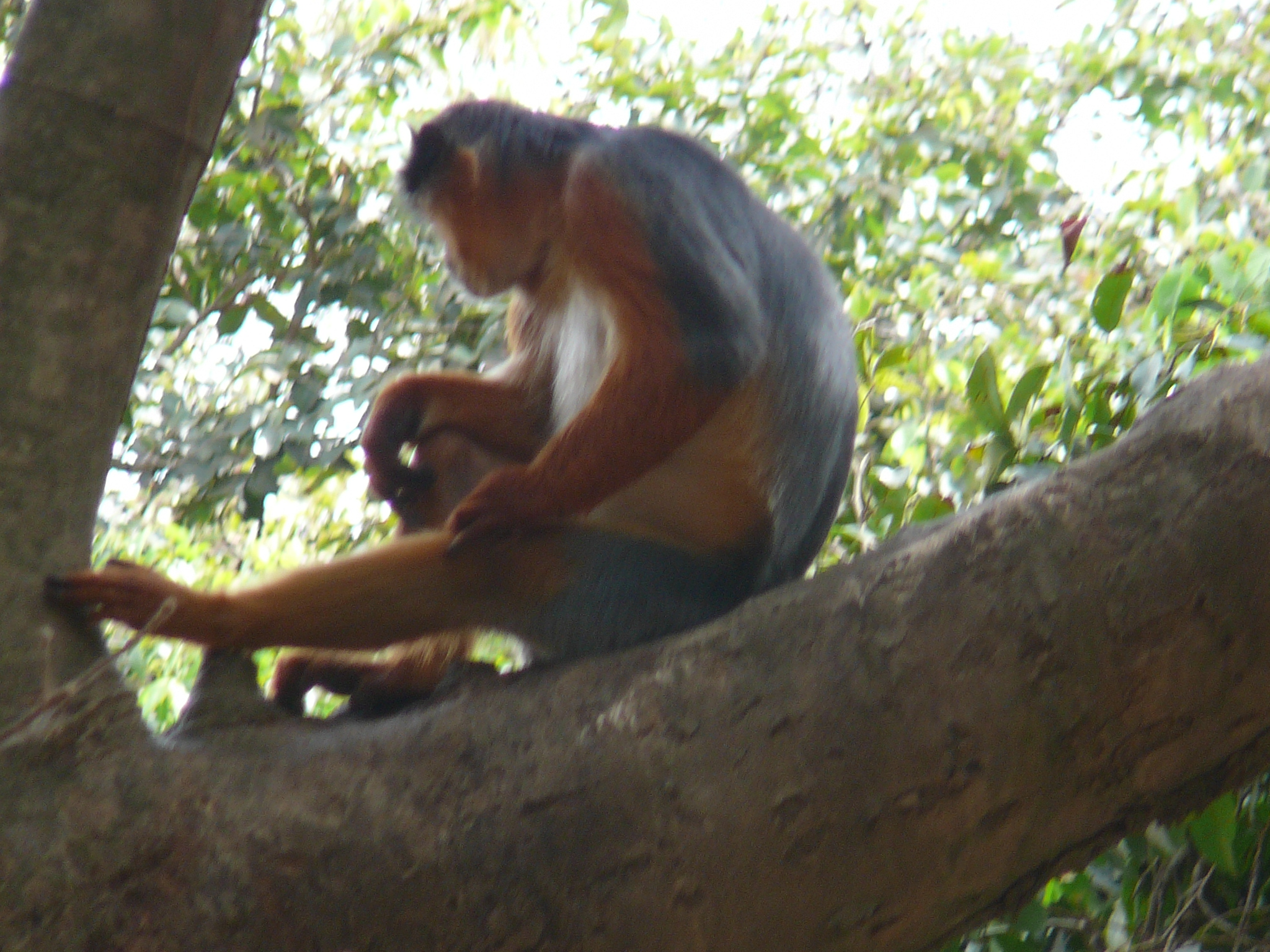
- Temminck's red colobus, Procolobus badius temminckii in Gambia

- Location within Nigeria
- Coordinates: 4°24′54″N 6°27′1″E
- Country: Nigeria
- State: Bayelsa State; Rivers State

Area
  - Total: 93.24 km^{2} (36.00 sq mi)

The Edumanom Forest Reserve is an area in the Niger Delta region of South East Nigeria that is home to some of the last chimpanzees in Nigeria. It covers part of the old Nembe Kingdom, which is now divided into the Nembe and Brass local government areas, in Bayelsa State and the Akuku Toru local government area of Rivers State.

The Edumanom forest reserve is a freshwater swamp forest with an area of 9,324 hectares (36.00 sq mi; 23,040 acres).

The habitat has been degraded by the oil industry and logging operations. Although there are relatively few roads in the region, hunters can gain access to the forest through the creeks and along oil pipelines. The forest is also under threat from the expansion of oil palm plantations. A proposed federal road from Ogbia to Nembe would run between two of the patches inhabited by chimpanzees in the Edumanom forest.

In 1995, hunter's reports suggested that there were 5-10 small chimpanzee groups in the general area, probably with no more than 50 individuals. Older hunters tended to avoid chimpanzee, but younger hunters boasted of killing them. Young chimps captured as a result of hunting typically are sold as pets or to zoos. A June 2008 report noted that the reserve was the last known site for chimpanzees in the Niger Delta.

The reserve also shelters the endemic Sclater's guenon and other IUCN Red List species olive colobus and Niger Delta red colobus. The Sclater's monkey was considered vulnerable but not endangered in 2008. It is hunted throughout the area, except in very few places where it is held sacred and is managing to survive. A 2005 report recommended that it be protected within the Edumanom and other reserves in Nigeria. There used to be red-capped mangabeys in the forest, but these are now thought to be extirpated. The Edumanom was since proposed as a forest reserve but essentially is used and managed as community forest land. The site is about 87 km^{2} (34 sq mi).The area overlaps both Ogbia and Nembe Local Government Area in Bayelsa State and includes patches of forests utilized by the Emago-Kugbo community in Rivers State.

== History ==
The roots of Edumanom Forest Reserve trace back to 1970 when it was singled out as one of the proposed Forest Reserves by the Rivers State Government, a compilation encompassing 11 distinct regions. At that time, the Governor of Rivers State, acting under the authority vested by Section 28 of the Land Use Act, rescinded all prevailing Rights of Occupancy associated with the land enveloping Edumanom Forest Reserve. Subsequently, the Commissioner of Agriculture and Natural Resources, sanctioned by Section 8 of the Forestry Law Cap 55 of the Laws of Eastern Nigeria, 1963, officially labeled the region as a forest reserve. The forest reserve derives its name from the Edumanom family in Otuabagi (Ogbia LGA), the entity possessing the largest segment of the reserve.

Edumanom Forest Reserve holds significance as one of the last habitats for chimpanzees in Nigeria. It spans a portion of the former Nembe Kingdom, now partitioned into the Nembe and Brass local government areas within Bayelsa State. This forest reserve is accessible to both tourists and historians alike.

== Climate ==
According to the Köppen-Geiger classification, the Edumanom Forest Reserve falls under the Af category, indicating a tropical rainforest climate.

The Edumanom Forest Reserve receives a significant amount of rainfall, with an annual average of approximately 2,562 mm (100.9 in). The wettest month is June, with an average rainfall of 363 mm (14.3 in), while the driest month is January, with an average rainfall of 73 mm (2.9 in).

The forest reserve experiences warm temperatures throughout the year, with an annual average temperature of 26.4 °C (79.5 °F). The warmest month is March, with an average maximum temperature of 27.5 °C (81.5 °F), while the coolest month is August, with an average minimum temperature of 24.9 °C (76.8 °F).

The relative humidity in the forest reserve shows a slight variation over the year, with September having the highest humidity at approximately 87.22%, while January experiences the lowest relative humidity at around 80.95%.

October is the month with the maximum rainy days, averaging 22 days, whereas January has the fewest rainy days, with 14 days.

Edumanom Forest Reserve enjoys an average of approximately 78.06 hours of sunshine per month, totaling around 2372.49 hours of sunshine throughout the year. January experiences the highest daily hours of bright sunshine, with an average of 7.93 hours per day.

Climate data for Edumanom Forest Reserve (Brass)
| Month | Jan | Feb | Mar | Apr | May | Jun | Jul | Aug | Sep | Oct | Nov | Dec | Year |
|---|---|---|---|---|---|---|---|---|---|---|---|---|---|
| Mean daily maximum °C (°F) | 29 (85) | 29.5 (85.1) | 29 (85) | 29.3 (84.8) | 28.7 (83.6) | 27 (81) | 26.4 (79.6) | 26.4 (79.5) | 26.7 (80.1) | 27.6 (81.6) | 28.4 (83.2) | 29.2 (84.5) | 28.1 (82.8) |
| Daily mean °C (°F) | 27.1 (80.7) | 27.4 (81.3) | 27.5 (81.5) | 27.4 (81.3) | 26.8 (80.3) | 25.7 (78.2) | 25.1 (77.1) | 24.9 (76.9) | 25.2 (77.3) | 25.7 (78.3) | 26.4 (79.6) | 27.1 (80.7) | 26.4 (79.4) |
| Mean daily minimum °C (°F) | 25.3 (77.6) | 26.0 (78.8) | 26.2 (79.1) | 25.8 (78.5) | 25.3 (77.5) | 24 (76) | 23.9 (75.1) | 24 (75) | 23.9 (75.1) | 24.3 (75.7) | 24.9 (76.8) | 25.5 (77.9) | 24.9 (76.9) |
| Average precipitation cm (inches) | 5.1 (2) | 7.6 (3) | 15 (6) | 18 (7) | 25 (10) | 36 (14) | 30 (12) | 20 (8) | 28 (11) | 28 (11) | 18 (7) | 7.6 (3) | 238.3 (94) |
| Average rainy days | 14 | 16 | 19 | 19 | 21 | 20 | 20 | 21 | 21 | 22 | 20 | 17 | 230 |
| Average relative humidity (%) | 81 | 83 | 83 | 84 | 85 | 86 | 86 | 86 | 87 | 87 | 85 | 83 | 85 |
| Mean daily sunshine hours | 7.9 | 7.6 | 7.4 | 7.3 | 6.7 | 5.5 | 5.0 | 5.2 | 5.3 | 5.9 | 6.5 | 7.7 | 6.5 |
Source: climate-data.org

== Fauna ==
Species identified in the Edumanom Forest Reserve include chimpanzees, manatees, and three sympatric crocodile species. Several of the species found in the reserve are of significant concern to conservationists.
