= Foster Ogola =

Nigerian politician

Senator 8th National Assembly
- Constituency: Bayelsa West senatorial district

Personal details
- Party: Peoples Democratic Party (Nigeria) (PDP)
- Occupation: Politician

Foster Ogola is a Nigerian politician. He served as a Senator representing Bayelsa West senatorial district in the 8th National Assembly.
