= Lawrence Ewhrudjakpo =

Nigerian politician (1965–2025)

His Excellency Lawrence Ewhrudjakpo
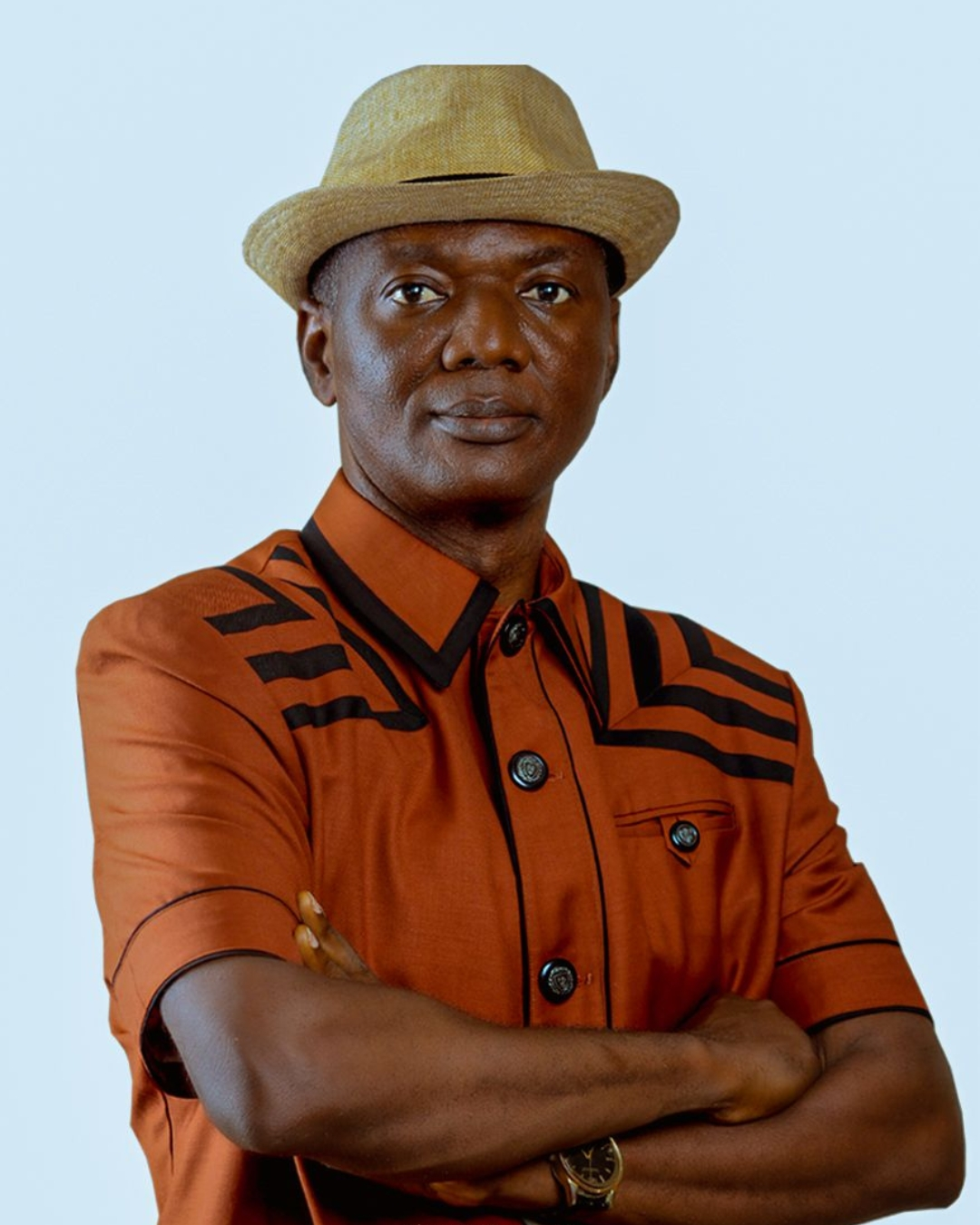

Deputy Governor of Bayelsa State
- In office 14 February 2020 – 11 December 2025
- Governor: Douye Diri
- Preceded by: Gboribiogha John Jonah

Senator for Bayelsa West
- In office 11 June 2019 – 11 February 2020
- Preceded by: Foster Ogola
- Succeeded by: Seriake Dickson

Personal details
- Born: Lawrence Oborawharievwo Ewhrudjakpo; 5 September 1965 Sagbama, Eastern Region, Nigeria (now Bayelsa State)
- Died: 11 December 2025 (aged 60) Yenagoa, Bayelsa, Nigeria
- Party: Peoples Democratic Party
- Spouse: Beatrice Ewhrudjakpo
- Education: Rivers State University of Science and Technology; Rivers State College of Health Science and Technology
- Occupation: Politician; lawyer

Lawrence Oborawharievwo Ewhrudjakpo (5 September 1965 – 11 December 2025) was a Nigerian politician who served as the deputy governor of Bayelsa State from 2020 until his death in 2025. He was the senator representing Bayelsa West Senatorial District from 2019 to 2020 in the 9th National Assembly.

== Early life and education ==
Ewhrudjakpo was born on 5 September 1965, into the family of Chief and Mrs. Awhowho Ewhrudjakpo in Ofoni at Sagbama, then Eastern Region. He attended the Ebikimiye Primary School, Kpakiama where he graduated in 1976, he continued his education at Government College Bomadi in 1982 and later completed his secondary education at Community Secondary School, Ofoni where he obtained his West African School Certificate (WASC) in 1987. He obtained a diploma in community health at Rivers State College of Health Science and Technology, Port Harcourt, Rivers State, between 1989 and 1991. He also attended the Rivers State University of Science and Technology, Port Harcourt between 1991 and 1996 where he obtained a Bachelor of Science (B. Sc.) in secretarial administration. In 1998, he obtained his Master's in Business Administration and also obtained an MBA, Management Option in 2000 at Rivers State University of Science and Technology. He later studied law between 2002 and 2007 at the Rivers State University of Science and Technology and was called to the bar in 2009. He was conferred Doctor of Philosophy (PhD) in Human Rights and Labour Law on 16 December 2023 by the Rivers State University of Science and Technology.

== Political career ==
On 4 October 2018, Ewhrudjakpo was announced as the winner of the PDP Bayelsa West primary election. On 23 February 2019, in the Bayelsa West senatorial election, he was announced winner having defeated Mathew Karimo of the APC having polled 49,912 votes as Karimo polled 20,219 votes.

Ewhurdjakpo was picked as the running mate to Douye Diri in the Bayelsa state governorship election. On 16 November 2019, Bayelsa Governorship Election, the candidate of the APC, David Lyon was declared winner having polled 352,552 votes to defeat Douye Diri, who polled 143,172 votes.

On 13 February 2020, the supreme court in Abuja ordered the Independent National Electoral Commission to withdraw the Certificate of Return issued to the All Progressives Congress candidate David Lyon as his running mate Degi Eremienyo Wangagra had been found guilty of presenting false certificates. The court also asked INEC to issue a new certificate of return to the candidate of the party with the next highest votes and with the required constitutional spread of votes.

On 21 February 2020, an Area Court in Lugbe Abuja ordered the Department of State Services (DSS) to investigate the allegation of forgery of a National Youth Service Corp (NYSC) certificate levelled against Ewhrudjakpo.

== Public service ==
Ewhrudjakpo served as Commissioner for Works and Infrastructure under the Restoration Government of the immediate past Governor of Bayelsa State, His Excellency, Senator Henry Seriake Dickson. He held this position for the full eight-year tenure of the administration.

One of his most significant achievements during this period was the construction of the Bayelsa International Airport. Despite the challenging economic climate marked by a national recession, Senator Ewhrudjakpo demonstrated resilience and commitment in ensuring the successful execution of this landmark project, alongside several other key infrastructural developments.

Later serving as the Deputy Governor of Bayelsa State under the Prosperity Administration led by Governor Douye Diri, Ewhrudjakpo played a critical role in resolving numerous long-standing inter- and intra-communal disputes. His efforts in conflict resolution significantly contributed to the stabilisation of local communities and enhanced the security of vital national assets, including oil pipelines across the state's creeks.

In addition to his responsibilities in Bayelsa, Ewhrudjakpo was appointed Chairman of the Nigerian International Coastal Border Platform. This strategic platform comprises the coastal states of Lagos, Delta, Ogun, Akwa Ibom, Cross River, Ondo, and Bayelsa. Its primary objective is to harmonise maritime laws, including the effective implementation of the Suppression of Piracy and other Maritime Offences (SPOMO) Act, to combat piracy and other maritime-related crimes across Nigeria’s coastal borders.

== Death ==
On 11 December 2025, Ewhrudjakpo slumped and was rushed to the Federal Medical Centre, Yenagoa, for urgent medical attention. It was later announced that he had died at the age of 60.
