= Julie Okah-Donli =

Nigerian lawyer (born 1966)

Chairperson, United Nations Voluntary Trust Fund for Victims of Trafficking in Persons (UNVTF), Executive Chairman, Roost Foundation
- In office December 2020 – December 2023
- President: Muhammadu Buhari
- Preceded by: Imaan Sulaiman-Ibrahim

Personal details
- Born: 30 December 1966 (age 59) Bayelsa State, Nigeria
- Education: Ahmadu Bello University
- Occupation: Chairperson, United Nations Voluntary Trust Fund for Victims of Trafficking in Persons (UNVTF), Executive Chairman, Roost Foundation and Former Director-General, National Agency for the Prohibition of Trafficking in Persons (NAPTIP)
- Known for: Author: Parenting in the 21st Century, Murky Waters and Ending Human Trafficking in Nigeria Human rights activism and philanthropy • legal career

Julie Okah-Donli (born 30 December 1966) is a Nigerian lawyer, chartered secretary and administrator, who served as the Director General of the National Agency for the Prohibition of Trafficking in Persons (NAPTIP), an agency established by the Federal Government of Nigeria in 2003 to tackle human trafficking and other related matters. She is the founder of the Julie Donli Kidney Foundation, an NGO that supports people with kidney disease and also mother of the musician, Lady Donli.

== Early life and education ==
Julie Okah-Donli was born on 30 December 1966 to the family of Navy Commander. and Mrs. Okah; she comes from Bayelsa State, Nigeria. She is the author of Parenting in the 21st Century, Murky Waters and Ending Human Trafficking in Nigeria

She obtained a Diploma in Law and a Degree in Law from the Ahmadu Bello University, Zaria, and was called to the bar in 1992. She won the Deans Award of Moot Court Competition.

== Career ==
From 1996 to 2002, Okah-Donli worked at Anthony Igbene & Co. S. O Ajayi as an Associate. She worked as executive assistant to Chief Timipre Sylva, former governor of Bayelsa State. She had also worked with the Securities and Exchange Commission (SEC), and also a one-time head of UBA Trustees. Okah-Donli established a Legal Firm: Julie Okah & Co (Legal Practitioners) which she was the principal partner. She later founded the Julie Donli Kidney Foundation.

On April 13, 2017, she was appointed by President Muhammadu Buhari to become the Director-General of NAPTIP. She has been leading the federal agency to tackle human trafficking, including organ trafficking and ritual killing.

Okah-Donli has advocated for more funding to tackle human trafficking and in inter-agency collaboration. Under her leadership as DG of NAPTIP, a Whistle Blowing Policy for Human Trafficking was formed.
