= Biobarakuma Degi =

Nigerian politician (born 1959)

Senator for Bayelsa East
- Incumbent
- Assumed office 11 June 2019
- Preceded by: Ben Murray-Bruce

Personal details
- Born: 22 February 1959 (age 67)
- Party: All Progressives Congress
- Occupation: Politician

Biobarakuma Wangagha Degi Eremienyo (born 22 February 1959), is a Nigerian politician and the senator representing Bayelsa East senatorial district of Bayelsa State at the 9th National Assembly. In 2019, he was appointed the vice chairman senate committee on gas resources and vice chairman senate committee on special duties.

== Early life and education ==
Degi is from Basambiri, Nembe, Bayelsa State. In 1990, he graduated from Rivers State University with a degree in agricultural economics/extension, before proceeding to receive a master of business administration from the same university.

== Political career ==
Degi started his political career in the 1980s. In 1990, he became a member of the local chamber in Nembe Local Government Area, becoming the vice-chairman in 1993 and chairman of the local government area in 1999. Later in his career, he served as a commissioner for rural development and chieftaincy affairs and also as a commissioner for health in Bayelsa State. He served as a member of the governing council of Federal University of Agriculture, Abeokuta and as executive director of human resources in FERMA.

In the 23 February 2019 general elections in Nigeria, Degi was elected as the senator representing Bayelsa East, he got 43,303 votes to beat the PDP candidate, Ipiganai Izagara who got 32,363 votes. On 10 September 2019, Degi was announced as David Lyon's running mate in the 16 November 2019 Governorship Election in Bayelsa State. On 12 November 2019, the federal high court in Abuja disqualified Degi as Lyon's running mate for the Bayelsa State governorship election on the basis of falsification of academic documents. The Court of Appeal in Abuja had halted the judgement disqualifying him as Lyon's running mate for allegedly filing false academic information on 15 November 2019.

On 16 November 2019, he was declared the deputy governor-elect of Bayelsa State by the Independent National Electoral Commission, INEC. On 13 February 2020, a day prior to his swearing-in as deputy governor, his election was invalidated by the Supreme Court of Nigeria on grounds that he submitted a fake certificate to the Independent National Electoral Commission.
