= Moses Cleopas =

Nigerian politician

Moses Cleopas is a Nigerian politician who won Bayelsa Central Senatorial bye-election in 2020.
