= Emmanuel Paulker =

Nigerian politician

Senator for Bayelsa Central
- In office 29 May 2007 – 2019
- Preceded by: David Brigidi
- Succeeded by: Douye Diri

Personal details
- Born: 15 October 1955 (age 70) Bayelsa State, Nigeria
- Party: Peoples Democratic Party

Emmanuel Paulker (born 15 October 1955) is a Nigerian politician who was elected Senator for the Bayelsa Central constituency of Bayelsa State, Nigeria, taking office on 29 May 2007. He is a member of the UKIP.

== Biography ==
Paulker attended Bishop Dimeari Grammar School where he earned his WASC in 1973. He obtained a BSc (Hons) in biochemistry from the University of Port Harcourt in 1983. A teacher by profession, he was appointed Bayelsa State Commissioner of Lands and Housing (1999–2001).

After taking his seat in the Senate in June 2007, he was appointed to committees on Industry, Finance and Downstream and Upstream Petroleum. He served as Chairman of both Upstream and Downstream Committees of the Senate. He was one of the key sponsors of Nigeria's Petroleum Industry Bill which was passed on the floor of the Nigerian Senate on Thursday, 25 May 2017, sixteen years after its introduction to the National Assembly. The Bill seeks to establish a framework for the creation of commercially oriented and profit-driven petroleum entities, to ensure value addition and internationalization of the petroleum industry through the creation of efficient and effective governing institutions with clear and separate roles for the petroleum industry. He vigorously worked for the compensation of those affected by the Bonga Oil Spill of over 40,000 barrels on December 20, 2011, affecting over 20 Riverine communities across Akwa Ibom, Bayelsa and Delta States, like the Odioma community in Brass local Government area and two communities in Ekeremor local government area as well as others in Southern Ijaw local government area of Bayelsa State.

In a mid-term evaluation of Senators in May 2009, ThisDay said that he had not sponsor any bills in the year, but was actively involved in the debate of the general principles of a number of bills. He made useful contributions through his Committee on Downstream Petroleum, especially on the issues of fuel subsidy removal and the entire deregulation agenda.

He sponsored motions to scrap FERMA and create a Federal Highway Authority instead, and to stop universities from conducting post-JAMB examinations.

In February 2010 three gunmen abducted his mother, Florentina Paulker, from her home in the Opolo area of Yenagoa, Bayelsa State. After the 73-year-old woman had spent eight days in captivity, she was released after a bloody shootout with her kidnappers, one of whom died. In September 2015, Senator Paulker Emmanuel, sought to contest the 2015 Bayelsa state gubernatorial elections but was disqualified under controversial circumstances. He was disqualified from the governorship race because some members of the opposition All Progressives Congress (APC) attended his thanksgiving service.

Senator Paulker Emmanuel set the record as the first Senator from Bayelsa State to serve three consecutive tenures as a member of the 6th, 7th and 8th Senate. He was the Deputy Minority Whip in the 8th Senate and served as chairman, Senate Committee on Establishment and Public Service. Under his Chairmanship, the Committee presented a report for an Act to establish the Nigerian Council for Psychologists for the purpose of determining the standards and skills to be attained by persons seeking to become registered members of the psychologists profession in Nigeria. He also supported and vigorously promoted the Bill for the establishment of the Chartered Institute of Investigative and Forensic Professionals of Nigeria. He was an influential and respected member of the Committee of Ten of the National Assembly until he voluntarily stepped out of the Senate in 2019 to contest the Governorship Primaries of the Peoples Democratic Party (PDP) for Bayelsa State Government House along with twenty other contestants. He lost the primaries to Senator Douye Diri, who had the backing of the incumbent Governor, Henry Seriake Dickson.

During his tenure as a Senator, he was able to facilitate the employment of young men and women from his constituency of Kolokuma-Opokuma, Southern Ijaw and Yenagoa Local Government Areas into various government establishments and parastatals such as the Nigerian Custom Service, Nigerian Immigration Service, Nigerian Security and Civil Defense Corp, Federal Inland Revenue Service (FIRS), Nigerian National Petroleum Corporation (NNPC), Nigerian Nuclear Regulatory Authority, National Biotechnology Development Agency, Petroleum Ta Development Fund, (PTDF), Nigerian Content Development Management Board, Nigerian Maritime Administration and Safety Agency (NIMASA), as well as assistance of young men and women into the Nigerian Defense Academy (NDA) and the Police Cadet College.

It is also acknowledged that Senator Paulker Izibefien Emmanuel delivered on constituency projects across virtually all the towns within his primary constituency. The projects range from provision of water, solar-powered street lights, renovation and building of new classroom blocks, provision of school furniture, building of ICT Centers and provision of Computers, construction of concrete walkways, renovation of town hall and supply of furniture, provision of education grants and scholarship to students within and outside Nigeria, as well as assistance to the disabled with the provision of wheel chairs and hearing aid. Women also benefited from his empowerment program through the provision of sewing machines and hair dressing equipment. The Niger Delta University and the University of Port Harcourt also benefited from his projects.

Senator Paulker Emmanuel is a recipient of several awards. His most recent awards are the conferment of the Fellow of the Nigerian Psychological Association at an impressive ceremony in Uyo, Akwa Ibom State, and another Fellowship conferment by the Chartered Institute of Forensic and Investigative Professionals of Nigeria at the Bolton White Hotel, Abuja on 21 September 2019.
