= Ben Murray-Bruce =

Nigerian politician (born 1956)

Ben Murray-Bruce OON

Senator for Bayelsa East
- In office 9 June 2015 – 9 June 2019
- Preceded by: Clever Ikisikpo
- Succeeded by: Biobarakuma Degi

Personal details
- Born: 18 February 1956 (age 70) Lagos, British Nigeria (now in Lagos State, Nigeria)
- Party: Peoples Democratic Party
- Spouse: Evelyn Murray-Bruce (m. 1980; died 2021)
- Children: 4
- Education: St. Gregory's College, Lagos; Iowa State University; University of Southern California
- Occupation: Politician; entrepreneur; motivational speaker
- Known for: Silverbird Group
- Website: benbruce.org; benmurraybruce.com

Benedict Murray-Bruce OON (born 18 February 1956) is a Nigerian business magnate and politician. He is the founder of Silverbird Group. A member of the People's Democratic Party, he was elected to the Senate of Nigeria in March 2015 where he represented the Bayelsa East Senatorial District, in Bayelsa State, Nigeria.

== Early life and education ==
Ben Murray-Bruce was born in Lagos, to mixed race Ijaw parents Mullighan and Margaret Murray-Bruce who both hail from Akassa, Bayelsa State, Nigeria. His surname is of Scottish origin. He attended Our Lady of Apostles, Yaba, Lagos, where he completed his primary education and St Gregory College, Obalende where he obtained the West African School Certificate before he proceeded to the University of Southern California in the United States, where he received a bachelor's degree in Marketing in 1979.

== Personal life ==
Ben Murray-Bruce was married to Evelyn Murray-Bruce for 41 years. On 20 March 2021, he announced her death after battling with cancer.

== Career ==
=== Early beginnings ===
Ben has served in various public positions. He served as Director-General of Nigerian Television Authority from 1999 to 2003. Prior to starting Silverbird Group, he promoted the Miss Universe Nigeria Pageant in 1983, Miss Intercontinental Pageant, 1986–1994 and to date, he promotes the annual Most Beautiful Girl in Nigeria Pageant which he began in 1986. He is currently a Member of the Board of National Arts Theatre, Nigerian Film Corporation, Federal Films Censors Board, National Film Distribution Company and Nigerian Anti- Piracy Action Committee.

=== Show business ===
In an interview with Connect Nigeria, Ben said he got into show business "by accident". His passion for show business made he and his wife establish the now defunct Silverbird Magazine in 1980 with a loan from his father. Ben later went into promoting concerts.

=== Politics ===
In 2011, Ben Murray-Bruce ran for the governorship of Bayelsa State which was unsuccessful after he was screened out of the gubernatorial race under the umbrella of the People's Democratic Party. On 27 October 2014, Ben later declared his intention to represent Bayelsa East Senatorial District at the National Assembly under the umbrella of the People's Democratic Party which he went on to win.

=== Public speaking ===
Bruce has spoken at a number of national and international events, in January 2018 he shared the stage alongside politicians and thought leaders at the inaugural Nigerian American Business Forum in Tampa, Florida, figures such as; senator Mohammed Shaaba Lafiagi, Media pioneer Biodun Shobanjo, NSE chairman Abimbola Ogunbanjo, motivational speaker Fela Durotoye, former governor Peter Obi and Award-winning technologist Ade Olufeko.

== Awards and recognition ==
- "Showbiz Icon of the Year Award" (2005)
- ""Top Ten" Significant Nigerian Businessmen Award" (2006)
- "Life Achiever Award" (2006)
- "Champion for Nation Building Award" (2007)
- "Excellent Personality Award" (2009)
- "Officer of the Order of the Niger" (2014)
