= Sagbama =

Sagbama SALGA
- LGA and town
- Interactive map of Sagbama
- Location in Nigeria
- Coordinates: 5°10′N 6°12′E
- Country: Nigeria
- State: Bayelsa State

Area
  - Total: 945 km^{2} (365 sq mi)

Population (2024 est)
  - Total: 318,200
  - Density: 337/km^{2} (872/sq mi)
- Time zone: UTC+1 (WAT)
- 3-digit postal code prefix: 561
- ISO 3166 code: NG.BY.SA

Sagbama is a town and Local Government Area in Bayelsa State, Southern part of Nigeria. Part of the area of the LGA lies within the Bayelsa National Forest.

It has an area of 945 km^{2} and an estimated population of 318,200 as at 2024. Sagbama LGA is in the town of Sagbama and consists of the districts of Aduku, Sagbama, Ossiama, OFONI, Odoni, Agbere, Asamabiri, Angalabiri, Ebedebiri, Osekwenike, Agoro, Toru Ebeni, Anyama Ibeni, Akeddie and Trofani, Eriama, Adagbabiri, Kabiama, Daganagbene, Esoni, Ogbonugbene, Egbepulugbene, Angiama, etc and the LGA is under Bayelsa West Senatorial District.

The postal code of the area is 561.

The local government chairman is Alice Tangi.

== Climate ==
In Sagbama community, the wet season is warm and overcast, the dry season is hot and mostly cloudy, and it is oppressive year round. Over the course of the year, the temperature typically varies from 70 °F to 88 °F and is rarely below 62 °F or above 91 °F. Sagbama is surrounded by water which mainly come from the Forcados River, sometimes referred to as Sagbama River.

The Sagbama river which a major source of drinking water in region, has been faced with diverse kinds of pollution, including crude oil pollution and open defecation by indigenes in the community.

== Communities in Sagbama ==
=== SALGA Constituency 1 ===
1. OFONI

2. ANGALABIRI

3. TORU ORUA

4. EBEDEBIRI

5. TORU ANGIAMA

6. BOLOU ORUA

=== SALGA Constituency 2 ===
7. OGOBIRI

8. SAGBAMA

9. AGOROGBENE

10. AGORO

11. OKUMBIRI

12. TORU-EBENI

13. ERIAMA

14. OSIAMA

15. KABIAMA Agoro

16. AKEDDIE

17. DAGANA-GBENE

18. EGBEPULUGBENE

19. EWEGBENE

20. OGBONUGBENE

21. ANYAMA-IBENI

22. ISONI

=== SALGA Constituency 3 ===
23. TUNGBABIRI

24. ADAGBABIRI

25. ELEMEBIRI

26. TROFANI

27. ISOKENIKE

28. ODONI

29. AGBERE

30. TUNGBO

31. ANIBEZE

32. OSIFO kingdom

33. ADUKU

34. KENAN

35. ABUOTOR

36. EKPERIWARE

37. OGBOKIRI

38. ASAMABIRI
