= Brass, Nigeria =

Brass Balga
- LGA
- Interactive map of Brass
- Location in Nigeria
- Coordinates: 4°18′54″N 6°14′30″E
- Country: Nigeria
- State: Bayelsa State
- Headquarters: Twon-Brass

Government
  - Type: Local Government Council
  - Local Government Chairman: Alabo Hanson Karima (PDP)

Area
  - Total: 1,404 km^{2} (542 sq mi)
- Elevation: 3 m (9.8 ft)

Population (2024 est)
  - Total: 426,150
  - Density: 303.5/km^{2} (786.1/sq mi)
- Time zone: UTC+1 (WAT)
- 3-digit postal code prefix: 562
- ISO 3166 code: NG.BY.BR

Brass is a Local Government Area in Bayelsa State, southern Nigeria. Its headquarters are in the town of Twon-Brass on Brass Island along the coast, it has a coastline of approximately 90 km on the Bight of Bonny. Much of the area of the LGA is occupied by the Edumanom National Forest.

It has an area of 1,404 km^{2} and an estimated population of 426,150 as at 2024.

The postal code of the area is 562.

== History ==
It is a traditional fishing village of the Nembe branch of the Ijo people. It became a slave-trading port for the state of Brass (Nembe) in the early 19th century. It was ruled by African merchant "houses", which were encouraged by the European traders. The state's chief slave-collecting centres (Brass and Nembe) often sent war canoes into the interior—especially through Igbo country—to capture slaves.

== Economy of Brass ==
Brass has enormous deposits of crude oil and natural gas and because of the rich natural resourceshas the presence of several national and international oil mining companies. The activities of these oil mining companies has contributed most of the economic development of the Brass area.

The Brass people are also known as farmers as farming is also an important economic activity with crops such as oil palm, plantain, and sugarcane grown in the Brass area. Another economic activities of the Brass people to sustain livelihood are Fishing and the making of fishing nets, construction of canoes also is another key economic features of the Brass area.

== Climate ==
The climate of Brass is tropical monsoon (classification: Am). The district experiences a yearly temperature of 29.05 °C (84.29 °F), which is -0.41% colder than the average for Nigeria. About 244.95 millimetres (9.64 inches) of precipitation and 300.37 wet days (82.29% of the time) are experienced annually in Brass.

== Notable people ==
- Kingsley Akpososo (born 1990), footballer
