= Nembe =

Local government area in Bayelsa, Nigeria

Nembe NELGA
- LGA and town
- Interactive map of Nembe
- Location in Nigeria
- Coordinates: 4°32′12.85″N 6°24′22.36″E
- Country: Nigeria
- State: Bayelsa State

Government
  - Local Government Chairman: Samuel Akalaguo (PDP)

Area
  - Total: 760 km^{2} (290 sq mi)

Population (2024 est)
  - Total: 327,500
  - Density: 430/km^{2} (1,100/sq mi)
- Time zone: UTC+1 (WAT)
- 3-digit postal code prefix: 562
- ISO 3166 code: NG.BY.NE

Nembe is a town and Local Government Area of Bayelsa State, Nigeria. The people of Brass, Nembe and Southern Ijaw Councils of Bayelsa State have bemoaned their neglect by oil companies operating in their areas.

They also lamented years of oil spillages that have destroyed their environment, aquatic life, as well as air and water pollution and called on the Bayelsa State Oil and Environmental Commission (BSOEC) and international communities to come to their rescue.

== History ==
It has an area of 760 km^{2} and an estimated population of 327,500 as at 2024. The postal code of the area is 562. Much of the area of the LGA is occupied by the Edumanom National Forest.

Nembe is one of the major communities in Bayelsa State, Nigeria. The Nembe people primarily reside in Nembe Local Government Area, as well as in the towns of Twon Brass and Okpoama in Brass Local Government Area. They are also present in other coastal parts of Bayelsa State, reflecting their traditional livelihoods as fishermen, traders, and farmers.

The Nembe people speak the Nembe language, a sub-dialect of the Ijaw language. Like many other ethnic groups, they observe traditional customs and taboos. In Nembe Kingdom, the killing of snakes—particularly pythons—is forbidden and regarded as a serious offense. According to local folklore, the people have a longstanding cultural relationship with pythons, a connection passed down through generations.

=== Masquerade Culture in Nembe ===
The masquerade culture of the Nembe people is inherited from ancient times. The masquerade culture is an ageless and ancient traditional practice amongst the Nembe people. The masquerade culture has retained its basic features, and have continued to colour the social and cultural landscape of the Nembe people.

History or tradition has it that masquerades are spirit beings, and the belief of the Nembe people is that masquerades are spirit beings, signifying that the ancestors of the community are embodied in them. Masquerades appears in different forms and shapes and can perform in daytimes as well as in odd hours of the night. In Nembe land, masquerade displays are commonly seen in festive occasions or periods, and in burial of prominent personalities such as kings and chiefs. The Masquerade dance is also common during coronation ceremonies.

The Nembe masquerade culture can be traced to a dance club called Sekiapu. Claims have it that Sekiapu was founded in the 18th century by Meinyai Orugbani, the last son of King Mein of Nembe. He introduced the Sakiapu club which became a unified umbrella body of many masquerades from Kula, his maternal home.

== List of towns and villages in Nembe LGA ==
Nembe Local Government Area consists of many villages and towns, below is the list:

1. Adukiri
2. Agada
3. Agbakabiriyai
4. Agrisaba
5. Akalukiri
6. Akakumana
7. Allagaokiri
8. Amasara
9. Atubo
10. Bendick-kiri
11. Benkiri
12. Dorgu-Ewoama
13. Dumobi-Kumakiri
14. Ekperikiri
15. Elemuama
16. Enyumuana
17. Etiema
18. Ewokiri
19. Fantuo
20. Fekorukiri
21. Igbeta-Ewoama
22. Ikensi
23. Isaiahkiri
24. Iseleogona
25. Iserekiri
26. Kalabile-ama
27. Mini
28. Namapogu
29. Nembe creek
30. Obiama
31. Obiata
32. Odekiri
33. Okipiri
34. Okokokiri
35. Okoroba
36. Okparantaba
37. Ologoma
38. Olusasiri
39. Oromabiri
40. Otatubu
41. Otumakiri
42. Sabatoru
43. Sangakubu
44. Shellkiri
45. Tengelkiri
46. Tengikokiri
47. Tombi

== Notable people ==
- Frederick William Koko Mingi VIII of Nembe

Chief Ebiegberi Joe Alagoa (born 14 April 1933) OON, FNAL, is a Nigerian academic and author. He is a fellow of the Nigerian Academy of Letters.

== Climate ==
The wet season is warm and overcast in Nembe, the dry season is hot and mostly cloudy, the temperature typically varies from 72 °F to 86 °F over the cost of the year and is rarely below 65 °F or above 89 °F.
