= Bayelsa East senatorial district =

Bayelsa East senatorial district in Bayelsa State, Nigeria, covers three local government areas of Brass, Ogbia and Nembe. The headquarters of Bayelsa East is Brass. As of 2019, Bayelsa East senatorial district has 36 Registration Areas (RA) and 622 polling units. The collation centre is in the Brass Local Government INEC office.

== List of senators representing Bayelsa East ==
Senator	Party	Year	Assembly
