= Bayelsa Central senatorial district =

Senatorial district in Nigeria

Bayelsa Central senatorial district in Bayelsa State, Nigeria covers four local governments of Kolokuma/Opokuma, Southern Ijaw and Yenagoa which is the state capital. This district has 43 Registration Areas (RAs) and 789 polling units (PUs). The collation centre is Yenagoa LGA Council Hall.

== List of senators representing Bayelsa Central ==
Senator	Party	Year	Assembly
