= Bayelsa West senatorial district =

Bayelsa West senatorial district in Bayelsa State covers two local governments of Ekeremor and Sagbama. Sagbama is the headquarters of Bayelsa West senatorial district. This district has Registration Areas (RA) and 394 polling units with the collation centre located at the INEC office in Sagbama LGA.

== List of senators representing Bayelsa West ==
Senator	Party	Year	Assembly
