= Nestor Binabo =

Nigerian politician

- Binabo in 2012

10th Governor of Bayelsa State (Acting)
- In office 27 January 2012 – 14 February 2012
- Preceded by: Timipre Sylva
- Succeeded by: Henry Dickson

Speaker of the Bayelsa State Assembly
- In office 7 July 2010 – 20 February 2012
- Deputy: Fini Angaye
- Preceded by: Werinipre Seibarugo
- Succeeded by: Kombowei Benson

Personal details
- Died: 29 June 2023 Abuja, Nigeria
- Party: All Progressives Congress (since 2015)
- Other political affiliations: People's Democratic Party (until 2015)
- Spouse: Martha Binabo

Nestor K. Binabo (died 29 June 2023 in Abuja, Nigeria) was a Nigerian politician and teacher who briefly served as the acting Governor of Bayelsa State, from January to February 2012. A member of the Peoples Democratic Party, he also served as Speaker and Deputy Speaker of the Bayelsa State House of Assembly. After leaving office, he was a member of the All Progressives Congress until his death in 2023.

== Political career ==
=== Pre-speakership and early career ===
Binabo began his political career in the Sagbama Local Council.

Later, Binabo was elected to the Bayelsa State Assembly, and served as deputy speaker and the State Commissioner of Youths and Conflict Resolution. He also served as acting speaker.

=== Speakership (2010–2012) ===
Binabo was elected speaker in July 2010, after his predecessor, Werinipre Seibarugo, was appointed deputy governor following the impeachment and removal of Peremobowei Ebebi. Binabo himself was initially floated as a candidate for the position. During his tenure, he drew controversy for allegedly supporting a plan to fire 500 government workers. In 2011, he was put on trial for allegedly failing to disclose that he was terminated from a position at Rivers State Ministry of Education and forging certificates presented to the Independent National Electoral Commission, which would have disqualified him from public office. He was found innocent in October.

==== Acting governorship (January–February 2012) ====
He was made acting Governor of Bayelsa on 27 January 2012, after Timipre Sylva, along with four other governors nationwide, was removed by the Supreme Court. During his brief tenure as acting governor, he fired several members of Sylva's cabinet, and threatened legal action against Chevron following a high-profile oil spill. He left office on 14 February 2012, and was succeeded by Henry Dickson of the People's Democratic Party. He subsequently resigned the speakership, citing the fact that both he and Dickson hail from the same senatorial district. He was succeeded by Kombowei Benson.

=== Post-speakership (2012–present) ===
In June 2012, after Benson was impeached and removed from the speakership by a majority of the Assembly, Binabo successfully nominated his own former deputy speaker, Fini Angaye, to fill the vacant slot.

==== Split from PDP and joining APC (2015) ====
He was expelled from the People's Democratic Party in May 2015 due to alleged anti-party activities in the 2015 general election. He, along with several dozen other PDP chieftains, formally defected to the All Progressives Congress in August 2015. In the years since, he took on increasingly anti-PDP political positions.

==== APC years (2015–2023) ====
In November 2015, in a speech in Yenagoa, he accused then-governor and former ally Henry Dickson of threatening to assassinate him over a local political rivalry. Dickson and the PDP denied all accusations and characterized them as lies.

As of May 2018, he was the leader of one of the two major factions of the Bayelsa APC. The leader of the other major faction was Timipre Sylva.

He was one of several prominent Bayelsa State APC politicians who endorsed President Muhammadu Buhari's 2019 reelection bid.

He died on 29 June 2023. Former president Goodluck Jonathan and governor of Bayelsa State Douye Diri sent their condolences through their spokespersons.

== Personal life ==
Binabo hailed from Okunbiri, Sagbama. Before entering politics, he worked for the Rivers State Ministry of Education as a teacher. He was fired in 1987 for indiscipline, which later became a scandal in his political career.

In March 2008, Binabo's 22-year-old son, Oyeinmomoemi Binabo, was abducted from campus at Niger Delta University. He escaped by running along the banks of the River Nun approximately 24 hours after the initial kidnapping.

Binabo's office at the Assembly was burgled in September 2011. Money and several valuables were stolen.

On 29 June 2015, Nestor Binabo's wife, Martha Binabo, was kidnapped from her workplace by unidentified gunmen in military uniforms. She was released, unharmed, in Rivers State on 5 July after a ransom was paid. She was released with a bag of fish and a N18,000 transport fare. Reportedly, the kidnappers told her to prepare pepper soup for her husband with the fish.

Binabo survived being physically attacked or assaulted at least three times, including a home invasion resulting in a fatality in 2010. He died after a lengthy illness on 29 June 2023, in Abuja.
