= 2019 Bayelsa State gubernatorial election =

2019 gubernatorial election in Bayelsa State, Nigeria

- 16 November 2019
- Turnout: 54.83%
Nominee	David Lyon	Douye Diri
Party	APC	PDP
Running mate	Biobarakuma Degi	Lawrence Ewrujakpor
Popular vote	352,552	143,172
Percentage	70.59%	28.66%
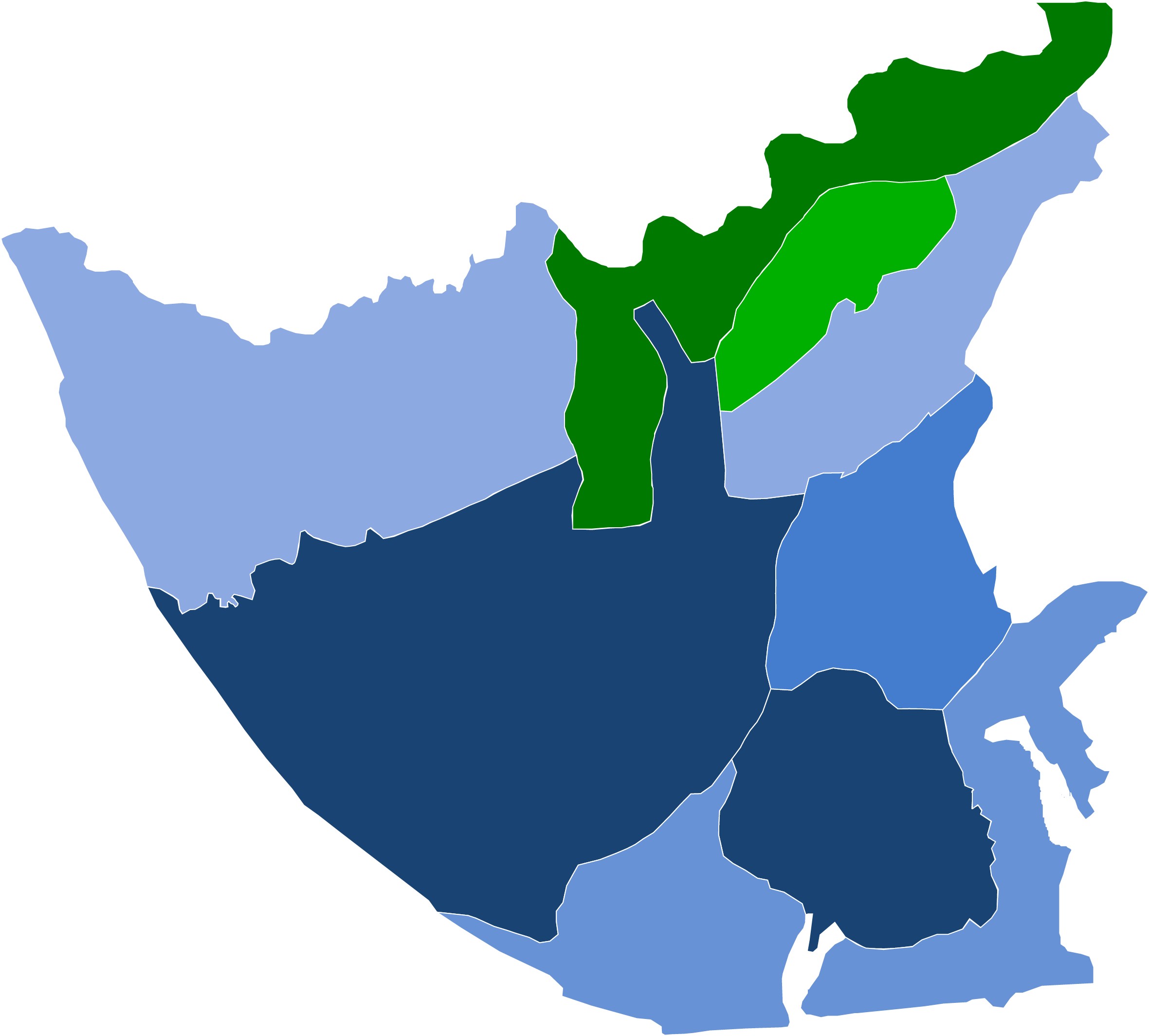
- LGA results Lyon: 50–60% 60–70% 70–80% >90% Diri: 60–70% 80–90%
Governor before election
Henry Seriake Dickson
PDP
Elected Governor
Election results annulled
Douye Diri becomes governor

The 2019 Bayelsa State gubernatorial election occurred on 16 November 2019, the APC nominee David Lyon won the election, defeating Douye Diri of the PDP.

David Lyon emerged APC gubernatorial candidate after defeating his closest rival, Diseye Nsirim. He picked Biobarakuma Degi as his running mate. Douye Diri was the PDP candidate with Lawrence Ewrujakpor as his running mate. 45 candidates contested in the election.

On 14 February 2020, due to irregularities in the filing of the candidacy of David Lyon's running mate, the Supreme Court annulled the election results. Under Nigerian election law, Douye Diri, as the second highest earner of votes, became governor.

== Electoral system ==
The Governor of Bayelsa State is elected using a modified two-round system. To be elected in the first round, a candidate must receive the plurality of the vote and over 25% of the vote in at least two-thirds of local government areas. If no candidate passes this threshold, a second round will be held between the top candidate and the next candidate to have received a plurality of votes in the highest number of local government areas.

== APC primary ==
The APC primary election was held on 4 September 2019. David Lyon won the primary election with 42,138 votes against 5 other candidates. His closest rival was Diseye Nsirim, who came a distant second with 1,533 votes.

=== Candidates ===
- David Lyon, businessman
- Diseye Nsirim
- Heineken Lokpobiri, former senator
- Preye Aganaba
- Prince Amgbare
- Maureen Etebu

=== Results ===
APC primary results
Party	Candidate	Votes	%
APC	David Lyon	42,138	92.0
APC	Diseye Nsirim	1,533	3.3
APC	Prince Amgbare	633	1.3
APC	Heineken Lokpobiri	571	1.2
APC	Maureen Etebu	564	1.2
APC	Preye Aganaba	354	0.7
Total votes		45,793	100.0

== PDP primary ==
The PDP primary election was held on September 3, 2019. Douye Diri won the primary election with 561 votes against 20 other candidates. His closest rival was Timi Alaibe, a former managing director of the Niger Delta Development Commission, who came second with 365 votes, Gboribiogha Jonah, the incumbent deputy governor, scored 62 votes.

=== Candidates ===
- Douye Diri, senator
- Keniebi Okoko
- Timi Alaibe, former managing director of the Niger Delta Development Commission
- Gboribiogha Jonah, incumbent deputy governor
- 17 other candidates

=== Results ===
PDP primary results
Party	Candidate	Votes	%
PDP	Douye Diri	561	46.0
PDP	Timi Alaibe	365	29.9
PDP	Keniebi Okoko	142	11.6
PDP	Gboribiogha Jonah	62	5.0
PDP	Other candidates	87	7.1
Total votes		1,217	100.0

== Results ==
A total number of 45 candidates registered with the Independent National Electoral Commission to contest in the election.

The total number of registered voters in the state was 922,562, while 517,883 voters were accredited. Total number of votes cast was 505,884, while number of valid votes was 499,551. Rejected votes were 6,333.

Candidate	Party	Votes	%
David Lyon	All Progressives Congress	352,552	70.57
Douye Diri	People's Democratic Party	143,172	28.66
Other candidates		3,827	0.77
Total		499,551	100.00
Valid votes		499,551	98.75
Invalid/blank votes		6,333	1.25
Total votes		505,884	100.00
Registered voters/turnout		922,562	54.83
Source: TVC News

=== By local government area ===
LGA	David Lyon APC		Douye Diri PDP		Total votes
LGA	#	%	#	%	#
Yenagoa	24,607		19,184		
Brass	23,831		10,410		
Nembe	83,041		874		
Sagbama	7,831		60,339		
Ogbia	58,016		13,763		
Kolokuma/Opokuma	8,934		15,360		
Southern Ijaw	124,803		4,898		
Ekeremor	21,489		18,344		
Totals	352,552		143,172		499,551
