= Ebi Ololo =

Nigerian politician

Ebi Ben Ololo

Commissioner for Environment, Bayelsa State
- In office 2024–incumbent
- Governor: Douye Diri

Personal details
- Party: People's Democratic Party
- Education: B.Sc. in Environmental Science
- Profession: Environmental professional, politician

Ebi Ben Ololo is a Nigerian environmental professional and Politician who serves as the Commissioner for Environment in Bayelsa State under Governor Douye Diri.

== Early life and education ==
Ololo holds a Bachelor of Science degree in Environmental Science from Niger Delta University and has postgraduate certification in Environmental Management and Policy from the Nigeria Institute of Ecology and Environment. He has also received training in Environmental Impact Assessment (EIA) practices and oil spill remediation techniques.

== Political career ==
Ebi was appointed Commissioner for Environment in Bayelsa State by Governor Douye Diri’s cabinet.

In January 2025, he ordered the indefinite closure of forest activities in the state to protect forest resources and promote sustainable forestry practices. He emphasized that logging and the transport of forest products were suspended without proper authorization to help preserve biodiversity and ecological balance.

He has also condemned illegal soil, unauthorized mining activities and sand excavation near critical infrastructure, and has also welcomed environmental activists and groups advocating for tree planting and greener practices.

== See also ==
- Executive Council of Bayelsa State
