= Beke Sese =

Nigerian politician, agricultural scientist

Commissioner for Agriculture and Natural Resources, Bayelsa State
- In office 2024–incumbent
- Governor: Douye Diri

Personal details
- Party: Peoples Democratic Party
- Education: B.Sc. Agricultural Science; M.Sc. Agronomy; Ph.D. in Soil and Crop Management
- Profession: Agricultural scientist, politician

Beke Sese is a Nigerian agricultural scientist and politician who serves as the Commissioner for Agriculture and Natural Resources in Bayelsa State under Governor Douye Diri.

== Early life and education ==
Beke Sese holds a Bachelor of Science in Agricultural Science from the University of Port Harcourt, a Master of Science in Agronomy from the University of Ibadan, and a Ph.D. in Soil and Crop Management from the Federal University of Agriculture, Makurdi.

== Career ==
=== Professional career ===
Sese is an academic and agricultural professional. He served as Head of the Department of Crop and Soil Science at Niger Delta University and worked as a consultant to the Federal Ministry of Agriculture on soil fertility initiatives. He was also a technical advisor on climate-resilient agriculture for projects supported by the United Nations Development Programme (UNDP) in the Niger Delta region.

=== Political career ===
Sese was appointed Commissioner for Agriculture and Natural Resources in Bayelsa State when Governor Douye Diri expanded his cabinet in 2024. Beke has also supported partnerships and projects to boost commercial food production and food security in collaboration with national and international programmes such as the IFAD-supported Livelihood Improvement Family Enterprise Project (LIFE-ND). Prof. Beke, led a ten-day official working visit to South Korea, organised by the Korean International Cooperation Agency (KOICA). The visit resulted in the donation of mechanised agricultural equipment worth over $500,000 from the Government of South Korea in January 2025, including tractors, rice milling machines, and rice seed beds.

== See also ==
- Executive Council of Bayelsa State
