= 2012 Bayelsa State gubernatorial election =

2012 gubernatorial election in Bayelsa State, Nigeria

- (Nigeria)
- February 11, 2012
- Turnout: 72%
Nominee	Henry Seriake Dickson
Party	PDP
Running mate	Gboribiogha John Jonah
Popular vote	417,500
Percentage	89%
Governor before election
Timipre Sylva
PDP
Elected Governor
Seriake Dickson
PDP

The 2012 Bayelsa State gubernatorial election occurred on February 11, 2012. PDP's Seriake Dickson won election for a first term, defeating other party candidates. Dickson received 89% of the total vote.

Seriake Dickson emerged the PDP candidate in the gubernatorial primary election. His running mate was Gboribiogha John Jonah.

== Electoral system ==
The Governor of Bayelsa State is elected using the plurality voting system.

== Primary election ==
=== PDP primary ===
The PDP primary election was scheduled to be held on November 19, 2011. The two main contenders were: Timipre Sylva and Henry Seriake Dickson. Sittinɡ governor, Seriake Dickson, was appointed by the party's working committee in the state as their candidate.

Timipre Sylva, the immediate past governor was disqualified from contesting in the primaries by the Supreme Court, after winning the party's primary election in 2011, just two months to the 2012 election.

=== Candidates ===
- Party nominee: Seriake Dickson
- Running mate: Gboribiogha John Jonah.
- Timipre Sylva: Disqualified.

== Results ==
PDP candidate Seriake Dickson won the election for a first term, defeating other party candidates. Dickson received 89% of the votes. Voters turnout statewide was put at about 72%.

The total number of registered voters in the state was 591,870. Total number of votes cast was 467,004.

Candidate	Party	Votes	%
Seriake Dickson	People's Democratic Party	417,500	
Timi Alaibe	Labour Party (Nigeria) (LP)		
Others			
Total			
Registered voters/turnout		591,870	–
