= Maxwell Ebibai =

Nigerian politician

Commissioner for Finance, Bayelsa State
- Incumbent
- Assumed office 2016
- Governor: Henry Seriake Dickson; Douye Diri

Personal details
- Profession: Accountant, public administrator
- Website: Bayelsa State Ministry of Finance Profile

Maxwell Ebibai is a Nigerian politician, accountant and public administrator who serves as the Commissioner for Finance in Bayelsa State, Nigeria. He was appointed to the State Executive Council in 2016 under Governor Henry Seriake Dickson

== Career ==
Before joining the Bayelsa State Executive Council, Ebibai worked in Nigeria’s financial sector, including serving as Senior Vice President and Head of Loan Administration at the Asset Management Corporation of Nigeria (AMCON). He has also held board positions in the private sector, including as a non-executive director at Linkage Assurance Plc.

Ebibai was appointed as the Commissioner for Finance in 2016, by Governor Henry Seriake Dickson, and was later reappointed under Governor Douye Diri, He is responsible for the state’s fiscal policy, budget planning, treasury operations, salary management, capital project funding, and oversight of financial reforms aimed at improving transparency and efficiency in public finance.

== See also ==
- Executive Council of Bayelsa State
