= Helen Kezie Nwoha =

Human rights advocate

- Born: Nigeria
- Education: Master's in Gender and International Development; Master's in Business Administration; Bachelor of Science in Zoology
- Occupations: Feminist, women's human rights defender, peace activist
- Known for: Executive Director at Women's International Peace Centre; Chair of Gender Is My Agenda Campaign (GIMAC)
- Notable work: 12 publications on regional gender discourse
- Board member of: Women Human Rights Defenders Network (Uganda); Network of African Women Mediators; African Union ECOSOC Advisory Group on Women, Peace, and Security in Africa

Helen Kezie Nwoha is a Nigerian feminist, women human rights defender and peace activist. She is the Executive Director at Women’s International Peace Centre, an organisation that is formerly known as Isis Women’s International Cross Cultural Exchange (Isis-WICCE). The Centre is focused on promoting women’s rights. In her role, Helen meets regional feminists and shares ideas on advancing gender and peace for women and girls in conflict situations . Helen has performed her leadership oversight and engaged in organizing thematic meetings like the "Situation Room in Election Efficacy" to advocate for justice in women empowerment and inclusion in elective politics at both national and International dimensions.

== Education ==
Helen pursued a Masters degree in Gender and International Development. She also holds Master’s degree in Business Administration and a Bachelors of Science in Zoology with over 20 years experience working on women’s rights and gender issues.

== Career ==
Helen has authored 12 publications about regional gender discourse. She has over 20 years experience working on women’s rights, gender, peace building, conflict resolution and governance. She has led advocacy initiatives, programs at regional and international levels. Helen has a background in research, fundraising and organisational development and is part of the Board of Directors for Women Human Rights Defenders Network in Uganda.

Helen is chair of Gender Is My Agenda Campaign (GIMAC), a network of over 55 organizations advocating for gender mainstreaming at the African Union. She is a member of the Network of African Women Mediators, and a member of the African Union Economic, Social and Cultural Council (ECOSSOC) Advisory Group on Women, Peace and Security in Africa.

== See also ==
- Jennifer Adighije
- Aisha Sulaiman Achimugu
- Joy Odiete
