= Alfred Watson Belemote =

Nigerian politician

Commissioner for Community Development, Bayelsa State
- In office 2024–incumbent
- Governor: Douye Diri

Personal details
- Profession: Politician

Alfred Watson Belemote is a Nigerian politician who serves as the Commissioner for Community Development in Bayelsa State under Governor Douye Diri.

== Political career ==
Belemote was appointed Commissioner for Community Development in Bayelsa State when Governor Douye Diri expanded his cabinet in June 2024.

As commissioner, he has overseen community development programmes aimed at improving socio-economic conditions and promoting peace and capacity building across communities. He also serves as the Chairman of the Bayelsa State Peace Architecture, promoting community peace and conflict resolution in the region.

In October 2025, Belemote resigned from the Peoples Democratic Party (PDP).

== See also ==
- Executive Council of Bayelsa State
