= Alfred Nimizigha =

Nigerian politician

Alfred Kemepado Nimizigha

Commissioner for Youth Development, Bayelsa State
- In office 21 June 2024 – incumbent
- Governor: Douye Diri

Personal details
- Party: Peoples Democratic Party

Alfred Kemepado Nimizigha is a Nigerian politician who serves as the Commissioner for Youth Development in Bayelsa State. He was sworn in as commissioner on 21 June 2024 when the Bayelsa State government re-established the Ministry of Youth Development under Governor Douye Diri.

== Career ==
He was nominated by Governor Douye Diri and subsequently confirmed by the Bayelsa State House of Assembly as Commissioner for Youth Development when the ministry was reconstituted on 21 June 2024.

== See also ==
- Executive Council of Bayelsa State
