= Godspower Oporomo =

Nigerian politician and cultural leader

Commissioner for Ijaw National Affairs, Bayelsa State
- In office 2023–incumbent
- Governor: Douye Diri

Personal details
- Party: Peoples Democratic Party
- Profession: Public administrator, community leader

Godspower Oporomo is a Nigerian public administrator and cultural leader who has served as the Commissioner for Ijaw National Affairs in Bayelsa State since 2023 under Governor Douye Diri. In this role, he has been involved in initiatives aimed at cultural preservation, community development, and advocacy for Ijaw interests.

== Political Career ==
Chief Oporomo has held leadership roles connected to community and cultural affairs. He was appointed Commissioner for Ijaw National Affairs in Bayelsa State, where he is responsible for overseeing policies and programs related to the Ijaw people and their cultural identity.

== See more ==
- Executive Council of Bayelsa State
