= Clement Andie =

Nigerian politician (1963–2015)

Clement Andie (July 23, 1963 – 2015) was a Nigerian politician and businessman from Ndoro, Bayelsa. He was elected to the Nigerian House of Representatives in 1999. He represented the Sagbama/Ekeremor Federal Constituency in Bayelsa, as a member of the Alliance for Democracy political party in the 4th National Assembly of Nigeria. In 2001, Andie is noted to have urged Shell Petroleum Development Company to honour a Memorandum of Understanding signed with Ogbotubo Community, accusing the company of not complying with multiple provisions. In 2006, Andie lost the Peoples Democratic Party's primary for the 2007 Bayelsa State gubernatorial election, having gained only 2 out of 2,450 votes. In 2010, he was a Chairman of Tamic Nigeria. In November 2012, representing Bayelsa, Andie was among three nominees confirmed by the senate for the Federal Character Commission.
