= Komuko Kharin =

Nigerian politician

Komuko Akari Kharin

Commissioner for Power, Bayelsa State
- In office 2024–incumbent
- Governor: Douye Diri

Personal details
- Party: Peoples Democratic Party
- Education: Rivers State University of Science and Technology; University of Port Harcourt
- Profession: Engineer, politician

Komuko Akari Kharin is a Nigerian engineer and politician who serves as the Commissioner for Power in Bayelsa State under Governor Douye Diri.

== Background ==
Kharin is from Ogbia Local Government Area in Bayelsa State.

== Education ==
Kharin studied Electrical Engineering at the Rivers State University of Science and Technology, where he obtained a bachelor's degree. He later earned a master's degree in Energy Management from the University of Port Harcourt. He is professionally registered with the Council for the Regulation of Engineering in Nigeria (COREN).

== Career ==
=== Professional career ===
Akari is an engineer. He has worked with the Niger Delta Power Holding Company (NDPHC). He also participated in electrification initiatives within Bayelsa State, including projects focused on expanding access to electricity in rural and underserved communities.

He has worked as a consultant on power-related projects, including independent power solutions and off-grid energy systems in the Niger Delta region. He is a member of the Nigerian Society of Engineers (NSE).

=== Political career ===
Komuko was appointed as Commissioner for Power in the Executive Council of Bayelsa State. He is responsible for addressing energy generation and distribution challenges, supporting infrastructure projects, and coordinating efforts to improve the electricity supply in Bayelsa State.

Kharin has responded to power sector challenges such as vandalism of transmission infrastructure, including collaborating with security agencies to address incidents that disrupted power distribution in parts of the state and neighbouring areas.

== See also ==
- Executive Council of Bayelsa State
