= Rex Flint George =

Nigerian politician

Commissioner for Budget and Economic Planning, Bayelsa State
- In office 2024–incumbent
- Governor: Douye Diri

Personal details
- Party: People's Democratic Party
- Profession: Politician

Rex Flint George is a Nigerian politician who serves as the Commissioner for Budget and Economic Planning in Bayelsa State under Governor Douye Diri.

== Political career ==
Flint was first appointed as Commissioner for Special Duties (Bayelsa Central). In April 2024, he was reappointed as Commissioner for Budget and Economic Planning in Bayelsa State.

In his role, he leads the Ministry of Budget and Economic Planning, which is responsible for preparing the state’s budgets, coordinating economic planning, and advising the government on fiscal policy.

== See also ==
- Executive Council of Bayelsa State
