= Keku Godspower =

Nigerian politician

Commissioner for Culture, Bayelsa State
- In office 2024–incumbent
- Governor: Douye Diri

Personal details
- Party: Peoples Democratic Party
- Profession: Politician

Keku Godspower is a Nigerian politician who serves as the Commissioner for Culture in Bayelsa State under Governor Douye Diri.

== Political career ==
In 2019, Keku was the Bayelsa State chapter of the People’s Democratic Party (PDP) secretary.

Keku Godspower was appointed Commissioner for Culture when Governor Douye Diri swore in a new set of commissioners to the Bayelsa State Executive Council in 2024. In this role, he is responsible for policies and programmes related to cultural preservation, promotion of heritage, and development of cultural industries in Bayelsa State.

== See also ==
- Executive Council of Bayelsa State
