= 2015 Bayelsa State gubernatorial election =

2015 gubernatorial election in Bayelsa State, Nigeria

- December 5, 2015
Nominee	Henry Seriake Dickson	Timipre Sylva
Party	PDP	APC
Running mate	Gboribiogha John Jonah	Wilberforce Titus Igiri
Popular vote	134,998	86,852
Governor before election
Henry Seriake Dickson
PDP
Elected Governor
Henry Seriake Dickson
PDP

The 2015 Bayelsa State gubernatorial election occurred in Nigeria on December 5, 2015. The PDP nominee Henry Seriake Dickson won the election, defeating Timipre Sylva of the APC.

Henry Seriake Dickson emerged PDP as the sole candidate. He picked Gboribiogha John Jonah as his running mate. Timipre Sylva was the APC candidate with Wilberforce Titus Igiri as his running mate.

== Electoral system ==
The Governor of Bayelsa State is elected using the plurality voting system.

== Primary election ==
=== PDP primary ===
The PDP primary election was held on September 24, 2015. Henry Seriake Dickson emerged PDP flag bearer after polling 447 votes as the sole candidate. Henry Seriake Dickson picked Gboribiogha John Jonah as his running mate.

=== APC primary ===
The APC primary election was held on September 30, 2015. Timipre Sylva emerged the party's flag bearer after polling 981 votes against 18 other candidates. His closest rival, Godknows Powel, who polled 39 votes while Wallman Agoriba came third with 28 votes. Timipre Sylva picked Wilberforce Titus Igiri as his running mate.

== Results ==
A total number of 20 candidates registered with the Independent National Electoral Commission to contest in the election.

The total number of registered voters in the state was 654,493, while 242,114 voters were accredited. Total number of valid votes was 225,520. Rejected votes were 6,647.

Candidate	Party	Votes	%
Henry Seriake Dickson	People's Democratic Party	134,998	60.42
Timipre Sylva	All Progressives Congress	86,852	38.87
Moses Siasia	People's Democratic Movement	1,572	0.70
Total		223,422	100.00
Valid votes		223,422	97.11
Invalid/blank votes		6,647	2.89
Total votes		230,069	100.00
Registered voters/turnout		654,493	35.15
Source: Channels TV

== Candidates and their parties ==
- Ken Gbahligha Gbalikuma, ACPN
- Chief Osain Dumome, ADC
- Abbey E.G Daniel, APA
- Timipre Marlin Sylva, APC
- Hon. Deacon Christopher Fullpower Enai, APGA
- Eneyi Gideon Roloand Zidougha, CPP
- Henry Pereokosifa Apeli, DPC
- Pius Abudou Waritimi, DPP
- Major Newline Dengeyifa Sam Yaudugagha, ID
- Isaac Suoyo Nathan KOWA
- Ogoriba Timiniderimo Kaiser, LP
- Ekubo Prince Tari, MPPP
- Namatebe Inko, NNPP
- Ere Hendrix Obragono, PDC
- Moses Ebipadou Siliko Siasia, PDM
- Dickson, Henry Seriake, PDP
- Alexander Peretu, PPA
- Enu Otonye, PPN
- Joy Prince Oniekpe, SDP
- Willams Woyinkuro Berezi, UPP
