= 2008 Bayelsa State gubernatorial by-election =

2008 gubernatorial election in Bayelsa State, Nigeria

2008 Bayelsa State gubernatorial election
- May 24, 2008
Nominee	Timipre Sylva	Ebitimi Amgbare
Party	PDP	AC
Running mate	Peremobowei Ebebi
Popular vote	538,204	26,635
Governor before election
Timipre Sylva
PDP
Elected Governor
Timipre Sylva
PDP

The 2008 Bayelsa State gubernatorial election occurred on May 24, 2008. Incumbent PDP Governor Timipre Sylva won re-election in the supplementary election, defeating AC candidate, Ebitimi Amgbare, to emerge winner. Sylva won in six LGAs of the state.

Timipre Sylva emerged winner in the PDP gubernatorial primary election. His running mate was Peremobowei Ebebi.

== Electoral system ==
The Governor of Bayelsa State is elected using the plurality voting system.

== Results ==
The two main contenders registered with the Independent National Electoral Commission to contest in the re-run election were PDP Governor Timipre Sylva, who won the contest by polling 538,204 votes, and AC's Ebitimi Amgbare, who follows closely with 26,635 votes. There were 588,399 valid votes altogether.

Candidate	Party	Votes	%
Timipre Sylva	People's Democratic Party (PDP)	538,204	91.58
Ebitimi Amgbare	Action Congress of Nigeria (ACN)	26,635	4.53
All Nigeria Peoples Party (ANPP)	6,892	1.17	
Progressive Peoples Alliance (PPA)	6,537	1.11	
All Progressives Grand Alliance (APGA)	2,172	0.37	
MRDD	1,719	0.29	
Democratic People's Party (DPP)	1,511	0.26	
Labour Party (LP)	1,186	0.20	
New Democratic Party (NDP)	1,180	0.20	
African Democratic Congress (ADC)	992	0.17	
RPN	630	0.11	
Total		587,658	100.00
Source: NDI
