= Peter Akpe =

Nigerian politician, academic, and public administrator

His Excellency Peter Akpe

Deputy Governor of Bayelsa State
- Incumbent
- Assumed office 25 February 2026
- Governor: Douye Diri
- Preceded by: Lawrence Ewhrudjakpo

Chief of Staff, Government House
- In office 2024 – February 2026
- Governor: Douye Diri

Member of the Bayelsa State House of Assembly
- Constituency: Sagbama I

Personal details
- Born: Peter Pereotubo Akpe Ebedebiri, Sagbama, Bayelsa State, Nigeria
- Party: Peoples Democratic Party
- Spouse: Favour Akpe
- Education: Rivers State University; University of Port Harcourt
- Occupation: Politician; academic; public administrator; clergyman

Peter Pereotubo Akpe is a Nigerian politician, academic, and public administrator who has served as the deputy governor of Bayelsa State since February 2026. He previously served as Chief of Staff to Governor Douye Diri, Majority Leader of the Bayelsa State House of Assembly, and a member of the Executive Council of Bayelsa State.

== Early life ==
Akpe was born in Ebedebiri, the Sagbama Local Government Area of Bayelsa State. He attended primary and secondary schools in Bayelsa State before proceeding to Rivers State University (then Rivers State University of Science and Technology), where he earned a Bachelor of Science (B.Sc.) degree in Technical Education with a specialisation in Electrical/Electronics, as well as a Master of Education (M.Ed.) degree in Educational Management and Planning. He later obtained his Doctor of Philosophy (PhD) degree in Educational Management and Planning from the University of Port Harcourt.

== Career ==
Prior to entering elective political office, Akpe spent over two decades in the civil service of Rivers State and Bayelsa State, rising through administrative ranks to become an Assistant Director before retiring. During his civil service career, he served as Head of Administration in the Office of the Deputy Governor of Bayelsa State.

He has participated in executive management and leadership programs at several international institutions, including Georgetown University, the University of Cambridge, and Stellenbosch Business School. Akpe is a Certified Management Consultant (CMC) and a Fellow of the Nigerian Institute of Management (FNIM).

== Political career ==
Akpe entered active public service through an appointment as a commissioner in the Bayelsa State House of Assembly Service Commission. He was subsequently elected to represent the Sagbama I constituency in the Bayelsa State House of Assembly for two terms, during which he served as the Majority Leader of the House and chaired the House Committee on Finance and Appropriation.

In executive administration, Akpe served as a cabinet commissioner in the Executive Council of Bayelsa State. He was later appointed Deputy Chief of Staff to Governor Douye Diri, briefly serving as Acting Chief of Staff before becoming the Chief of Staff at Government House in Yenagoa.

=== Deputy Governor of Bayelsa State ===
Following the death of Deputy Governor Lawrence Ewhrudjakpo in December 2025, Governor Douye Diri nominated Akpe as his replacement. His nomination was screened and confirmed by the Bayelsa State House of Assembly on 24 February 2026. He was officially sworn into office on 25 February 2026 by the Chief Judge of Bayelsa State, Justice Matilda Ayemieye, at Government House, Yenagoa.

== Distinctions ==
- Certified Management Consultant (CMC)
- Fellow, Nigerian Institute of Management (FNIM)
- Associate Member, Chartered Institute of Taxation of Nigeria (CITN)

== Personal life ==
Akpe is married to Favour Akpe, and they have children and grandchildren. He is an ordained pastor in the Redeemed Christian Church of God.
