= Linda Somiari Stewart =

Nigerian politician and author

Hon. Linda Somiari Stewart

Member, Rivers State House of Assembly
- Incumbent
- Assumed office 2023
- Constituency: Okrika Constituency

Personal details
- Party: All Progressives Congress (since 2025)
- Other political affiliations: Peoples Democratic Party (until 2025)
- Occupation: Politician, author, journalist

Linda Somiari Stewart is a Nigerian politician, author, and journalist who represents Okrika Constituency in the Rivers State House of Assembly.

== Career ==
In addition to her political role, Somiari Stewart has worked in journalism and literary writing. She has published works focused on African folklore and oral traditions.

Her published works include Woyingi: God Is a Woman, and The Legend of Tari-Ere: The Picky Virgin.

=== Political career ===
Somiari Stewart contested in the 2023 general elections and was elected to the Rivers State House of Assembly to represent Okrika Constituency. She serves as Deputy Majority Leader of the 10th Assembly. On 5 December 2025, she was among 16 lawmakers, including the Speaker, who defected from the Peoples Democratic Party (PDP) to the All Progressives Congress (APC).
