= Biriyai Dambo =

Nigerian lawyer and politician

Biriyai Dambo SAN

Attorney General and Commissioner for Justice, Bayelsa State
- In office 25 August 2020 – incumbent
- Governor: Douye Diri

Personal details
- Party: Peoples Democratic Party
- Profession: Lawyer, politician

Biriyai Dambo, SAN (born 8 July 1961) is a Nigerian lawyer and politician who serves as the Attorney General and Commissioner for Justice of Bayelsa State, Nigeria.

== Early life and background ==
Biriyai was born on 8 July 1961 in Lagos, Nigeria, and hails from Nembe-Bassambiri in Bayelsa State.

== Education ==
He attended Government Comprehensive Secondary School, Borikiri in Port Harcourt and later Federal Government College, Port Harcourt. He earned a Bachelor of Laws (LL.B) degree from the University of Lagos in 1986. He also completed his training at the Nigerian Law School, after which he was called to the Nigerian Bar in 1988.

Dambo earned a Master of Laws (LL.M) from the University of Lagos in 2003. He was conferred with the rank of Senior Advocate of Nigeria (SAN) in 2013.

== Career ==
=== Legal career ===
Before ressuming the role of Attorney General and Commissioner for Justice, Dambo practised law. He founded the legal firm Biriyai Dambo & Co in 1994, and served as the Principal Partner.

He has held various positions in legal practice, including roles that expanded his expertise into corporate governance, maritime law, and community legal issues.

=== Political career ===
On 25 August 2020, Dambo was appointed Attorney General and Commissioner for Justice of Bayelsa State, and re-appointed in April 2024. He has served in legal-related committees such as reconciliation and technical committees addressing state and community issues.

== See also ==
- Executive Council of Bayelsa State
