= Elizabeth Bidei =

Nigerian politician

Commissioner for Women, Children Affairs, Empowerment and Social Development, Bayelsa State
- In office 2023–2024
- Governor: Douye Diri

Personal details
- Party: Peoples Democratic Party

Elizabeth Timilaemi Bidei was a Nigerian public administrator who served as the Commissioner for Women, Children Affairs, Empowerment and Social Development in Bayelsa State until her death in December 2024.

== Career ==
Elizabeth obtained a Bachelor's Degree in Sociology at the University of Port Harcourt. Thereafter she obtained a Master's Degree in Development Studies from Rivers State University. Furthermore, she trained at the institute of Social Studies in The Hague, Netherlands, thereby earning a professional certificate in Gender Development Planning. Bidei was a member of the Bayelsa State Executive Council and was responsible for policies and programmes aimed at improving the welfare of women and children, as well as promoting empowerment initiatives within the state.

Bedei also worked with other development partners including UNICEF to implement child protection frameworks, especially in coastal and riverine communities vulnerable to trafficking, abuse, or neglect.

Her contributions to public service and women’s empowerment were recognised by Governor Douye Diri and other members of the executive council following her death.

Her Key achievements during here tenure include:

- Launching of the Bayelsa State Action Plan to Combat Gender-Based Violence.
- Establishment of Women Empowerment Resource Centres across five LGAs.
- Partnership with the Ministry of Justice to set up gender-sensitive mediation units.
- Coordination of the state's safe Motherhood initiative and campaigns on menstrual health.

== Death ==
Elizabeth died on Monday, 30 December 2024.

== See also ==
- Executive Council of Bayelsa State
