= Onuma Johnson =

Nigerian politician

Commissioner for Special Duties - General Services, Bayelsa State
- In office 2024–incumbent
- Governor: Douye Diri

Personal details
- Party: Peoples Democratic Party
- Profession: Politician

Mazi Onuma Johnson is a Nigerian politician who serves as the Commissioner for Special Duties - General Services in Bayelsa State under Governor Douye Diri.

== Early life and background ==
Onuma is from Abia state, Nigeria.

== Political career ==
Onuma Johnson was appointed as Commissioner for Special Duties - General Services in Bayelsa State as part of the cabinet of Governor Douye Diri. The Ministry of Special Duties (General Services) was among several portfolios created or restructured when the governor expanded his executive council in 2024.

Before he was appointed commissioner, Johnson served as Special Adviser on Non-Indigene Affairs to Governor Diri, overseeing matters related to non-indigenous residents and fostering inclusive governance in the state.

== See also ==
- Executive Council of Bayelsa State
