= Abel Ebifemowei =

Nigerian politician

Chief Abel Ebifemowei (AKA Osuwo 1) was born in Amassoma, Ogboin North Local Government Area, Bayelsa State, southern Nigeria on 6 December 1963 to Late Chief Abel Femowei and Mrs Yoruba Ere. He is a cousin to the former governor of Bayelsa State, Chief Diepreye Alamieyeseigha. He was also the special adviser to Chief Diepreye during his time in office.

Before he had anything to do with politics, he studied aviation electronics and missiles explosives at the Russian Military Academy. He also worked as a specialist on missiles assembly at the Ministry of Defence in the old Soviet Union. He came back home on the invitation of his cousin, Chief D.S.P. Alamieyeseigha, to join the governor’s cabinet as a special adviser on youth logistics and government house transport.

In September 2005, Chief Abel was accused to be among the family members who allegedly helped Alamieyeseigha to launder public funds into private accounts. An attempt to assassinate Chief Abel was made on Saturday 12 December 2009 in Yenagoa, which he narrowly escaped.
