= 2022 Bayelsa State floods =

Major floods in Nigeria in 2022

2022 Bayelsa State Flooding
- Date: September to November 2022
- Location: Bayelsa State, Nigeria
- Cause: Release of water from Lagbo Dam in Cameroun and Long-term rainfall leading to flash floods and river overflowing
- Property damage: 300 communities underwater and 1.3 million people displaced

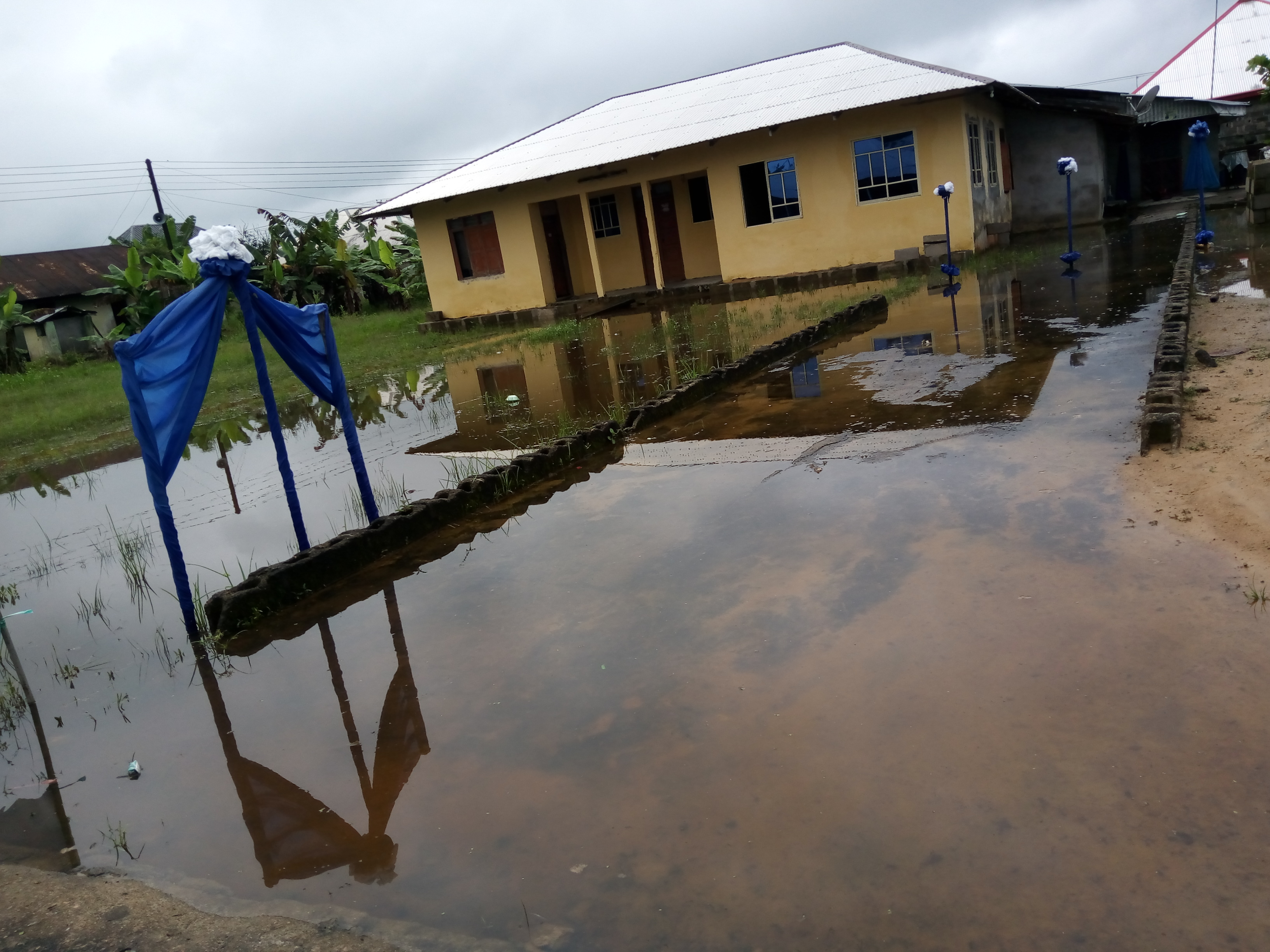
Flood in Bayelsa

The 2022 Bayelsa State Flooding took place between September and November 2022 in Bayelsa State, Nigeria. It displaced at least 1.3 million people as confirmed by the Bayelsa State Emergency Management Agency.

== Causes ==
Release of water from Lagbo Dam in Northern Cameroun to avoid bursting and overstretching of the dam and its surroundings was one of the main cause of the flood. Also the consistent weeks of rainfall led to flash floods, discharges and overflowing of rivers in the state which led to submerging of farmlands and residential living areas.

The governor, Douye Diri accused the federal government of negligence during the floods after the Minister of Humanitarian Affairs, Disaster Management and Social Development, Sadiya Farouq said that the state was not one of the worst hit.

This claim was countered by the governor and the United Nations who described the state flood as one of the worst hit and needing urgent attention.

== Effects on climate change ==
The flood affected the major East West road and the Patani axis in Delta State leading to closure of the road for commutants during the period of the flood. The flood was similar to the one that happened in the state in 2012 where communities were submerged in the state.

Due to the massive nature of the floods and the disaster, close to 6,000 IDP camps were established in the state at Oxbow lake and at the Igbogene centre.
