= Preye Broderick =

Nigerian politician

Commissioner for Transport, Bayelsa State
- In office 2023–incumbent
- Governor: Douye Diri

Personal details
- Party: Peoples Democratic Party

Preye Broderick is a Nigerian politician serving as the Commissioner for Transport in Bayelsa State. She was appointed to the position under the administration of Governor Douye Diri and is a member of the Peoples Democratic Party.

== Political career ==
In April 2024, Governor Douye Diri re-swore in a new batch of commissioners for his second term, and Preye Broderick, who previously served as Commissioner for Special Duties (East), was redeployed to the Ministry of Transport.

== See also ==
- Executive Council of Bayelsa State
