= Moses Teibowei =

Nigerian politician

Commissioner for Works and Infrastructure, Bayelsa State
- Incumbent
- Assumed office 2020
- Appointed by: Douye Diri

Personal details
- Profession: Estate surveyor, public administrator

Moses Teibowei is a Nigerian politician, estate surveyor and public administrator who serves as the Commissioner for Works and Infrastructure in Bayelsa State under the administration of Governor Douye Diri.

== Education ==
Teibowei attended State School, Odi from 1970 to 1976, followed by Government Secondary School, Odi from 1976 to 1981. He obtained a Bachelor of Technology in Estate Management from Rivers State University of Science and Technology, Port Harcourt in 1987.

== Career ==
Teibowei worked as an auxiliary teacher at Government Secondary School, Odi from 1981 to 1983. During his university years he had an attachment at the Rivers State Housing and Property Development Authority in 1985.

In 1989 he joined the public service of Rivers State as Assistant Stadium Manager at the Rivers State Stadia Authority, Port Harcourt in 1989.

After creation of Bayelsa State, he became Head of the Bayelsa Stadia Authority, Yenagoa from 1996 to 1998; later he moved to the State Ministry of Lands and Housing, where he advanced to Head of Lands Department and subsequently Director of Lands. He was appointed Permanent Secretary, Ministry of Lands & Survey, Bayelsa State, where he serverd from 2012 to 2020.

In August 2020, he was appointed Commissioner for Works and Infrastructure for Bayelsa State. He was re-appointed on 29 April 2024 to continue in the same role for the administration’s second tenure.

== Fellowship ==
He is a Fellow of the Nigerian Institution of Estate Surveyors and Valuers (NIESV).

== See also ==
- Executive Council of Bayelsa State
