= King Tamuno-Omisiki Opuiyo Ogube =

Nigerian ruler (born 1961)

King Air Commodore Tamuno-Omisiki Emmanuel Opuiyo Ogube (rtd), JP, DSS, fdc, (born 15 June 1961) is a Traditional Ruler whose contributions span military service, governance, philanthropy and traditional leadership. As the Amayanabo (king) of Kirike Kingdom, Ogube reflects a lifetime of excellence in public service, military leadership, societal reform, growth and sustainable development.

== Early life ==
Born in Okrika, Rivers State, Nigeria, to Pa Rhode Iniokwoinari Opuiyo and Dawuta Senibofori Kingoli, his early years were spent in Okrika. He attended St. John's State School, Port Harcourt, and Ibuluya/Dikibo Primary School, Okrika, between 1968 and 1974. Ogube had his secondary education at the Okrika Grammar School where he graduated in 1980.

== Military career ==
Ogube's journey into the Nigerian Air Force marked the beginning of an illustrious military career. He gained admission in 1981 at the then Rivers State University of Science and Technology (now Rivers State University), where he earned his bachelor's degree in accounting. He emerged as one of the only two students from the formal Rivers State (comprising present day Rivers and Bayelsa States) to be awarded the Defence Scholarship into the Nigerian Air Force University Cadet Course II, commissioning as a Pilot Officer in 1984. His career in the Air Force spanned 31 years, during which he rose to the rank of Air Commodore before voluntarily retiring in 2015.

His military education includes the Senior Finance Administrator's Course (Berlin, Germany) and the Senior Staff Course from the Armed Forces Command and Staff College (AFCSC), Jaji. He was awarded the Forces Service Star (FSS), Meritorious Service Star (MSS) and the Distinguished Service Star (DSS), among other military honours.

== Traditional leadership ==
In 2015, Ogube was unanimously elected and installed as Chief and Head of the Ogube War Canoe House. By 2017, he was chosen by his people to be coronated as the Amayanabo of Kirike Kingdom, a position that places him at the pinnacle of traditional authority over more than 64 War Canoe Houses and 72 towns, villages and hamlets. He was recognized officially by the Governor of Rivers State on December 27, 2017.

As a traditional ruler, Ogube has worked to bridge relationships between the Niger Delta and other parts of Nigeria. He was part of the delegation of leaders of Pan Niger Delta Forum (PANDEF) who visited President Tinubu to discuss matters concerning the Niger Delta.

== Awards and honours ==
Ogube has been honoured with numerous awards, including the Most Outstanding Royal Father of the Year by National Network Newspaper, Pilar of the South South Media and Entertainment Awards and various commendations for his contributions to peace and economic development.

== Family life ==
He is married to Queen Barrister Elizabeth Tamunoibuomi Opuiyo Ogube, DSSKK, a lawyer and public servant dedicated to women's empowerment. Together, they have raised six children.
