= Amassoma =

Amassoma is a community located in Wilberforce Island, Ogboin North of Southern Ijaw Local Government Area in Bayelsa State, Nigeria.

The Amananaowei of Amassoma Community, Major Graham Pele-Ebimo Naingba, JP, Oboro VII was laid to rest in January 2023.

The community plays host to the Niger Delta University.

The Bayelsa State Airport is located near Amassoma.

== Climate ==
=== Cloud cover ===
In Amassoma, the average percentage of the sky covered by clouds experiences significant seasonal variation over the course of the year. The clearest month of the year in Amassoma is December, the cloudiest month of the year in Amassoma is April.

=== Humidity ===
The month with the fewest muggy days in Amassoma is January, with 23.7 days that are muggy or worse.
