= Alanyingi Sylva =

Former first lady of Bayelsa State

First Lady of Bayelsa State
- In role 29 May 2007 – 29 May 2015
- Governor: Timipre Sylva
- Preceded by: Patience Jonathan
- Succeeded by: Rachael Dickson

Personal details
- Born: Uduak Alanyingi Sylva Eket, Akwa Ibom State, Nigeria
- Spouse: Timipre Sylva
- Occupation: politician; administrator; health coach

Alanyingi Sylva is a former First Lady of Bayelsa State and spouse of Timipre Sylva. She is the Chairperson of the Center for Gender Values and Culture and in 2021 was honored as the humanitarian person of the year at the Focus Africa Awards.

== Personal life ==
Alanyingi Sylva is married to the politician Timipre Sylva. They have three children: Taria, Timipre and Pagabio.

== See also ==
- Patience Jonathan
