= Gboribiogha John Jonah =

Nigerian politician and retired naval officer

Deputy Governor of Bayelsa State
- In office 14 February 2012 – 14 February 2020
- Governor: Henry Seriake Dickson
- Preceded by: Peremobowei Ebebi
- Succeeded by: Lawrence Ewhrudjakpo

Acting Governor of Bayelsa State
- In office 2012–2012

Chief of Naval Engineering, Nigerian Navy

Personal details
- Born: March 6, 1954 (age 72) Nembe, Bayelsa State, Nigeria
- Party: People's Democratic Party (PDP)
- Occupation: Naval officer, politician

Military service
- Branch/service: Nigerian Navy
- Rank: Rear Admiral

Gboribiogha John Jonah (born March 6, 1954, in Nembe, Nigeria) is a Nigerian politician and retired naval officer. He served as the deputy governor of Bayelsa State. He was speculated to be a candidate for Governor of Bayelsa State in 2019, but he did not run for health reasons. David Lyon went on to win.

== Early life and education ==
Jonah was born on 6 March 1954 in Nembe, Bayelsa State, Nigeria. He attended St. Luke's Primary School, Nembe, and Nembe National Grammar School. He later joined the Nigerian Defence Academy.

== Military career ==
Jonah served in the Nigerian Navy and attained the rank of Rear Admiral. During his military career, he held different positions, including serving as Chief of Naval Engineering at the Naval Headquarters before retiring from the Navy.

== Political career ==
Jonah joined politics after retiring from the Nigerian Navy. He served as Deputy Governor of Bayelsa State from 14 February 2012 to 14 February 2020 under Governor Henry Seriake Dickson. He briefly served as Acting Governor of Bayelsa State in 2012 when the governor was unable to perform his duties.

In 2019, Jonah expressed interest in contesting the Bayelsa State governorship election under the People's Democratic Party (PDP) but later withdrew from the process.
