= Aisha Sulaiman Achimugu =

Nigerian Business leader, philanthropist, entrepreneur

Aisha Sulaiman Achimugu OFR
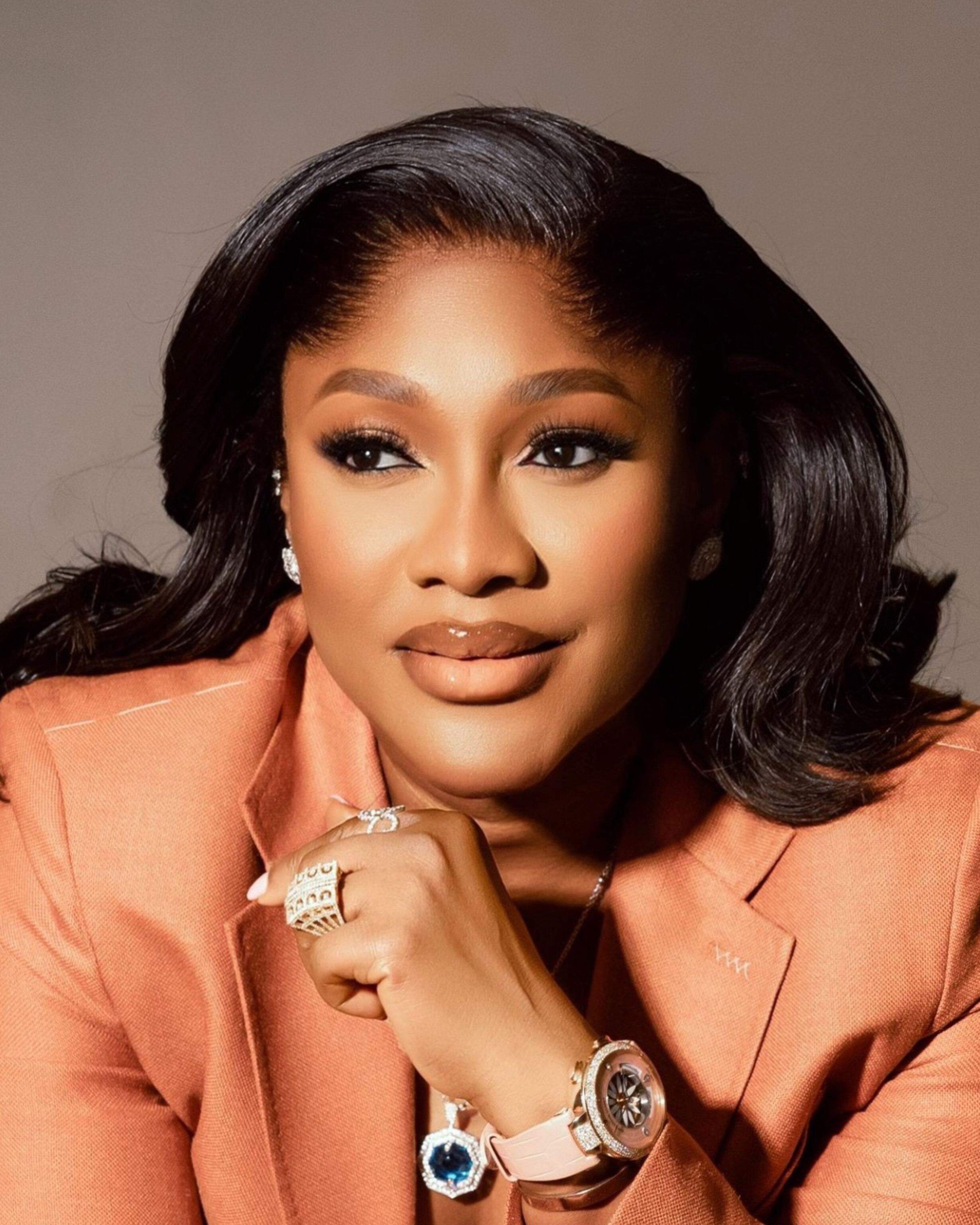
- Aisha Sulaiman Achimugu in 2025
- Born: January 22, 1974 (age 52); Benue State, Nigeria
- Occupations: Business magnate; philanthropist; entrepreneur
- Years active: 1998–present
- Organization: Felak Group
- Website: aishaachimugu.com

Aisha Sulaiman Achimugu OFR (born 22 January 1974) is a Nigerian business executive, entrepreneur and philanthropist. She is the Group Managing Director and Chief Executive Officer of Felak Group, a diversified Nigerian conglomerate operating across engineering, maritime, oil and gas, ICT and development sectors. She also serves as Chairman and Board member of Bluewave Exploration and Production Limited. Achimugu is recognized for her leadership in Nigeria’s energy and infrastructure sectors and for her philanthropic work through the Sam Empowerment Foundation.

== Early life and education ==
Aisha was born on 22 January 1974 to Captain J.E.A. Adole (Rtd.) and Mrs. Adole. She is an indigene of Ofu Local Government Area of Kogi State. She attended Federal Government Girls Science School, Kuje, Abuja, before proceeding to the University of Jos, where she obtained a Bachelor of Science degree in Accountancy in 1998. She later earned a Master’s degree in Business Management from the University of Belize. In 2010, she received an Honorary Doctorate Degree from Commonwealth University, Belize. She also completed the Advanced Leadership Programme in Corporate Governance at the Møller Institute, University of Cambridge.

== Career ==
Aisha began her career in business after completing her master's degree programme. She subsequently went on to establish and lead ventures in the engineering and services sectors and later became the Group Managing Director and Chief Executive Officer of Felak Group, a Nigerian technical and professional consortium operating across engineering, maritime, oil and gas, information and communications technology (ICT), and development services. The group includes companies such as Oceangate Engineering Oil & Gas Limited and has expanded its operations into areas such as energy services, infrastructure development, engineering consulting, and corporate training. She has also been associated with initiatives supporting the development of a deep-sea port project in the South-South region of Nigeria.

She also serves as Chairman and Board Member of Bluewave Exploration and Production Limited. In addition to her professional work, Aisha completed the Advanced Leadership Programme in Corporate Governance and Administration at the Møller Institute, University of Cambridge, and obtained certification in Legislative Engagement on the Petroleum Industry Bill.

== Philanthropy ==
Aisha founded the Sam Empowerment Foundation, the corporate social responsibility arm of Felak Group. Through the foundation, she supports programmes focused on community development, women and youth empowerment, humanitarian outreach, and other social impact initiatives across Nigeria.

== Personal life ==
Aisha Sulaiman Achimugu was married to Engineer Sulaiman Akao Achimugu, a former Managing Director of the Pipelines and Products Marketing Company (PPMC). He died in 2020 due to complications from COVID-19. The marriage was blessed with three children.

== Awards and recognition ==
Year	Award ceremony	Prize	Result
2013	City People Magazine Award	Personality of the Year	Won
2013	PAN African Youth Parliament	African Woman Personality of the Year Award	Won
2016	Pan African Humanitarian Award	Award on Enterprise and Service to Humanity	Won
2016	African Transparency Initiative	Most Outstanding/Successful Entrepreneur	Won
2018	Rotary International Award	Award of Excellence	Won
2022	Le Meridien Ile Maurice, Mauritius	Best Employer Brand Award	Won
2022	Forbes Best of Africa	Innovative Leadership Award	Won
2024	US Presidential Lifetime Achievement Awards	Lifetime Achievement Award	Won
2025	SUN Awards 2025	Entrepreneur of the Year	Won
