= Jennifer Adighije =

Nigerian engineer

Managing Director and CEO of Niger Delta Power Holding Company
- Incumbent
- Assumed office August 2024
- Appointed by: Bola Tinubu
- Preceded by: Chiedu Ugbo

Personal details
- Born: 15 April 1983 (age 43) Lagos State
- Education: University of Lagos (B.Sc.); Queen Mary University of London (MSc)

Jennifer Adighije (b. 15 April 1983) is a Nigerian engineer who has served as the managing director and chief executive officer of the Niger Delta Power Holding Company since August 2024. Appointed by President Bola Tinubu, she is the first woman to be appointed to the office.

== Early life and education ==
Adighije is the daughter of Senator Chris Adighije, who once represented Abia Central Senatorial District in the Red Chamber of the National Assembly. She earned her BSc in electrical and electronics engineering from the University of Lagos, and her MSc in wireless networks and telecommunications from Queen Mary University of London and MPhil from the Catholic University of Murcia, Spain, in 2025.

== Career ==
Adighije began her career as a transmission maintenance engineer at the Power Holding Company of Nigeria. She later worked at Globacom as a Network Switching Subsystem (NSS) specialist and subsequently joined Helios Towers Nigeria as Head of Operations and Planning. She transitioned into financial services, serving as a Value Engineer and Cost Controller at the Central Bank of Nigeria. In 2023, she was appointed as senior special assistant to the president on entrepreneurship development in communications, innovation, and the digital economy.

In August 2024, Adighije was appointed as the first female managing director and CEO of the Niger Delta Power Holding Company by President Bola Tinubu, hence the successor of Chiedu Ugbo.

In 2009, Adighije founded House of Silk (HOS), a fabric retail and tailoring company. The brand gained recognition in Nigeria's fashion industry and was a finalist in the MTN Lagos Fashion and Design Week Awards in 2012.

== Awards and recognition ==
Adighije is a Fellow of the Nigerian Society of Engineers. She received the Young Achievers Award by This Day as well as the Energy Times Award in 2025.
