= 2007 Bayelsa State gubernatorial election =

State election in Nigeria

- 14 April 2007
| Nominee | Timipre Sylva | Ebitimi Amgbare |
| Party | PDP | ACN |
| Popular vote | 776,715 | 10,789 |
Governor before election
Goodluck Jonathan
PDP
Elected Governor
Timipre Sylva
PDP

The 2007 Bayelsa State gubernatorial election was the 3rd gubernatorial election of Bayelsa State. Held on 14 April 2007, the People's Democratic Party nominee Timipre Sylva won the election, defeating Ebitimi Amgbare of the Action Congress of Nigeria.

== Results ==
Timipre Sylva from the People's Democratic Party won the election, defeating Ebitimi Amgbare from the Action Congress of Nigeria. Registered voters was 955,279.

2007 Bayelsa State gubernatorial election
| Party | Candidate | Votes | % | ±% |
|---|---|---|---|---|
| PDP | Timipre Sylva | 776,715 | 0 | |
| ACN | Ebitimi Amgbare | 10,789 | 0 | |
| PDP hold | | | | |
