= Harold Dappa-Biriye =

Nigerian politician and arts patron

Chief Harold Jenewari Dappa-Biriye was a Nigerian politician who was a chairman of the Niger Delta Congress and was known for his advocacy of minority rights in Nigeria. He was also a chairman of the Nigeria National Council of Arts and Culture and it was during his tenure that the first international festival of African arts and culture (FESTAC) was held. An arts patron, he promoted events such as Bonny's traditional war canoe regattas.

As a rights activist, he believed that Nigerian states should have prominent roles in the control of their economic, political and social policies.

== Life ==
Biriye was born on September 26, 1920, as Harold Wilcox, the son of Rowland and Rebecca Wilcox of Peterside, Bonny. He studied at Bonny Government School, then proceeded to King's College, Lagos. After King's College, he worked for less than a year at the Post and Telecommunications and the Public Works Departments, mostly writing electricity bills, but his attitude was not predisposed to civil service work. Upon leaving civil service, he engaged in the exportation of commodities such as black pepper, piassava and rattan canes.

In 1941, he co-founded the Ijo Peoples League, a platform to unite Ijos that were in different divisions of the Eastern region under one province.

After the end of World War II, Biriye was involved in politics; he was an early member of the NCNC but his experience of the competition between the NCNC and the AG formed his understanding that ethnic minorities needed better representation as the core base of both parties came from the majority Igbo and Yoruba ethnic groups. He began a campaign for the creation of Rivers State. In 1953, he gained the support of the Action Group for the creation of an independent state but the plan to include Old Calabar and the Ogoja provinces as part of a new COR state pushed him away from the group.

In response to the need of the 1957 Constitutional Conference to include all shades of opinions, Biriye pressed for the representation of Ijaws among the delegates. He was supported by the Conference of Rivers Chiefs which gave him the mandate to represent the Ijaw region at the conference and also to present their case that the area should be accorded the same status as it was in the 1880s when the Oil Rivers chiefs of Bonny, Nembe, Brass, Ogoni, Ahoada and Degema signed treaties with the British. Unsuccessful legal presentations were made by Biriye and Udo Udoma that granting independence to Nigeria without adequate protection of the rights of the Rivers Provinces as a separate state would be a violation of the treaties. In 1959, he became the chairman of the Bonny County Council.

In 1967, changes in the structure of governance led to the creation of Rivers State and in 1969, Biriye was appointed a commissioner. He was commissioner for Agriculture and later redeployed to work in the state's Ministry of Works.

Biriye was appointed chairman of the National Council of Arts and Culture by General Yakubu Gowon, the council was involved in the preparation of FESTAC 77. During the Festac festival, Biriye was the Admiral of the regatta event while in 1956, his father was Admiral of the regatta that welcomed Queen Elizabeth II during her visit to Nigeria.
