= Toru-Ndoro =

Town in Bayelsa State, Nigeria

Toru-Ndoro or Ndooola is a community located in Ekeremor Local Government Area of Bayelsa State, Nigeria.

== Background ==
It is divided in to two sub parts which are; Tamo-biri and Tubu-biri. Tamobiri is made up of Pere-egede, Abuko-bolou, Bioweizi, Waidirimo, Tarapere, and Ayama-egede, while Tubu-biri section of the community has Kuwazi-egede, Siboulo/Si-egede, and Andeigbene

In January 2018, some groups of militants invaded Ndotto community which led to the killings of some village members.
