= Niger Delta Power Holding Company =

Nigerian electricity company

- Founded: 2005
- Headquarters: Abuja, Nigeria
- Key people: Jennifer Adighije (Managing Director)
- Services: Electricity
- Website: ndphc.net

The Niger Delta Power Holding Company (NDPHC) was founded in 2005 as a privately held company under Nigerian law. Its ownership is divided among the federal state and local governments of Nigeria.

NDPHC is the successor of the Power Holding Company of Nigeria (PHCN). It owns the power stations being built through the National Integrated Power Projects (NIPP). The creation of the NDPHC was financed with funds from the Excess Crude Oil Account (ECOA).

In May 2024, the NDPHC cancelled a debt of N200 billion owned by electricity operators and the government.

== Managing directors ==
- 2016-2024: Joseph Chiedu Ugbo
- Since 2024: Jennifer Adighije
