= Werinipre Seibarugo =

Nigerian politician

8th Governor of Bayelsa State (Acting)
- In office 16 April 2008 – 27 May 2008
- Preceded by: Timipre Sylva
- Succeeded by: Timipre Sylva

Werinipre Seibarugo is a People's Democratic Party politician who was appointed acting Governor of Bayelsa State in southern Nigeria from 16 April 2008 to 27 May 2008.

Seibarugo took office after the election of governor Timipre Sylva was annulled on the basis that the Independent National Electoral Commission had failed to file a summary of results from polling units, and that the election had therefore never taken place. As speaker of the Bayelsa State House of Assembly, Seibarugo was sworn in as governor on 16 April 2008, with a new election to be held within three months. The election took place on 24 May 2008. Sylva was elected with an overwhelming majority and was sworn in again on 27 May 2008.
