= Okrika =

- LGA and town
- Okrika
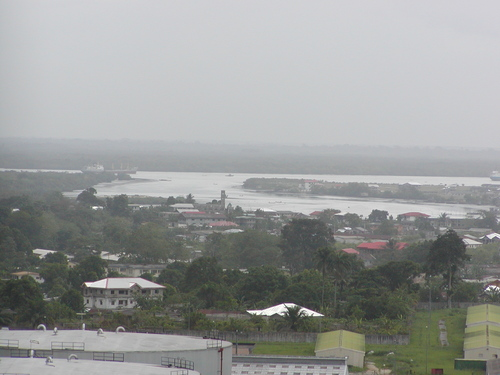
- Aerial view of part of Okrika mainland (foreground) and island (background)
- Interactive map of Okrika
- Location within Nigeria
- Coordinates: 4°44′23″N 7°4′58″E
- Country: Nigeria
- State: Rivers State

Government
  - LGA Chairman: Achese Igwe
  - Deputy LGA Chairman: Charity Igbulubo (PDP)
  - Wards: Ward 1: Gilbert Wakama (PDP); Ward 2: I Ibinabo Williams (PDP); Ward 3: Otonye Titus (PDP); Ward 4: Hebron Nyanabo (PDP); Ward 5: Paul Godwill Abam (PDP); Ward 6: Tomquin Sobere (PDP); Ward 7: Joshua Tomquin JP (PDP); Ward 8: Tamunokuro Fubara George (PDP); Ward 9: Prince Godwin Bipialaka (PDP); Ward 10: Reuben Iselema (PDP); Ward 11: Virginia Fimie (PDP); Ward 12: Royal Clifford Ateke (PDP)
- Elevation: 452 m (1,483 ft)

Population
  - Estimate (2022): 379,000
- Time zone: UTC+1 (WAT)
- Postal Code: 500103

Okrika // is a town and Local Government Area (LGA) in Rivers State, Nigeria, with Okrika town serving as its administrative headquarters. Okrika LGA is one of the 10 ijaw LGAs in Rivers State. It lies within the Rivers East Senatorial District and shares boundaries with Eleme LGA to the north and east, Ogu/Bolo LGA to the south, and Port Harcourt LGA to the west.

As of 2022, the Rivers State Primary Health Care Management Board estimated the population of Okrika LGA at over 379,000, distributed across 143 communities.

Okrika's primary economic activity is fishing, while Christianity is the dominant religion, with some residents practicing African Traditional Religion. Many residents in Okirika are from neighbouring Ijaw villages, which has influenced Okirika culture.

The town is located at an average elevation of 452 m (1,483 ft) and lies to the north of the Bonny River on Okrika Island, approximately 56 km (35 mi) from the Bight of Bonny. It is accessible to vessels with a maximum draft of 9 m (30 ft).

Initially established as a fishing settlement by Ijaw migrants from various central Ijaw clans and from the Wilberforce Island region, Okrika became the capital of the Okrika Kingdom in the early 17th century. During this period, the community, like others in the region, was involved in the slave trade. After the abolition of the slave trade in the 1830s, Okrika became a port for exporting palm oil, though it was less prominent than Bonny (46 kilometres or 29 miles to the south) and Opobo (81 kilometres or 50 miles to the east-southeast).

By 1912, Okrika had lost its significance as a trading hub, overshadowed by Port Harcourt. It regained commercial relevance in 1965 with the completion of the Port Harcourt refinery and the construction of pipelines to a jetty on Okrika Mainland. The area also hosts the Alakiri gas plant, which supplies gas to the refinery and other facilities.

Currently, refined petroleum products are one of Okrika's main exports. The town also engages in local trade of fish, oil palm products, processed salt, cassava, taro, plantains, and yams. However, the fishing industry has been impacted by environmental pollution linked to crude oil activities.

== Socio-cultural organisation ==
Before 1913, the Okrika Kingdom was composed of nine traditional towns: Kirike, Ogoloma, Ogu, Bolo, Ogbogbo, Ibaka, Ele, Isaka, and Abuloma. These towns often included satellite villages. Over time, the addition of Koniju Town (Koni-ama) brought the total to ten towns.

The Okrika people are originally of Ijaw origin, with their culture significantly shaped over time, as result of migration, intermarriage, trade relations, and shared settlement spaces, many aspects of Okrika culture reflects their ties to Ijaw. These include language features, traditional practices, attire, dances, songs, religious expressions, and elements of social organisation such as marriage customs. Historical factors (particularly regional migration patterns, the trans-Atlantic trade era, and the palm oil economy) further deepened the cultural blending between Okrika and their Ijaw neighbours.

Language has played an important role in the historical relationship between Kalabari and Okrika. The Okrika people speak the Okrika language, similar to the neighbouring Kalabari language; although distinct, both languages have developed mutual influence due to prolonged contact, trade, and geographical proximity. This interaction has produced some degree of oral intelligibility and shared linguistic features, which is also seen among neighbouring communities in Rivers and Bayelsa States. While each group maintains its own language and written forms, the similarities that have emerged through centuries of interaction have supported communication and social exchange between them.

Marriage has long played a central role in sustaining ties between the two groups, with intermarriage remaining common even during periods of conflict. In Okrika, the traditional form of marriage is the Igwa (small dowry) system, which historically structured marital relations, lineage affiliation, and inheritance. The Iya/Ya marriage (large dowry), by contrast, was not originally an Okrika practice. It developed among neighbouring like Kalabari where it was associated with kings, chiefs, and wealthy families due to its substantial cost and the elevated inheritance rights it conferred on the wife and her children. Okrika later adopted the Iya/Ya system from these communities, using it as a marker of prestige among families who could afford the higher bridewealth. Over time, this borrowed practice became more widespread as economic circumstances improved.

In Okrika, traditional marriage practices are closely linked to inheritance norms and the position of women within the lineage. A key feature of Okrika custom is that girls who marry outside their father’s household generally lose inheritance rights in their natal lineage. This reflects an Igbo cultural influence, as patrilineal inheritance restrictions for married daughters are characteristic of many Igbo communities. As a result, married Okrika women are typically buried in their husband’s community rather than in their father’s compound.

The Igwa marriage, which involves a smaller dowry, historically limited inheritance rights for both the wife and her children, favouring patterns of succession that did not fully integrate the children into the father’s lineage. However, contemporary practice in Okrika increasingly allows children from Igwa unions to inherit from their fathers, particularly when they reside with or are raised by them. These evolving marriage and inheritance customs illustrate the dynamic interplay between traditional norms and changing social expectations within Okrika society.

=== Festivals ===
Iria Festival: The Iria festival dates back to the 16th century; an annual ceremony of womanhood that is held at a market square in Okrika, an ancient town in Rivers State, Nigeria. Breasts-baring maidens are seen being initiated by the people into womanhood. Virgins are presented and kept in the fattening room, where they are taken care of for the festival

== List of towns and villages in Wakirike Kingdom ==
- Abam
- Abiobo
- Abuloma
- Amadi
- Agbkien
- Andi-kiri
- Asemeningolike
- Bolo
- Daka Ama
- Dan-kiri
- Dikibo
- Ekerekana
- Ele
- George
- Gbelabo Ama
- Ibaka
- Ibuluya/Dikibo
- Ikiriko
- Ikpo-kiri
- Isaka
- Iyo-kiri
- Kalio
- Koko Ama
- Mbi-kiri
- Ngbagbeboko
- Ngolo
- Oba
- Obianime
- Obumuton-chiri
- Odokorobie
- Ogan
- Ogbogbo
- Ogoloma
- Ogu
- Ojimba
- Okochiri
- Okujagu
- Okumgba
- Okuru
- Omoaobi
- Omodere
- Opuada
- Otobipi
- Owuogono
- Ozuboko
- Sara
- Semembiri
- Tere
- Teriapu-Kiri
- Wakama

- Aberepikima

== Autonomous Communities ==
The Okrikans are organised into autonomous communities. Okrika is composed of several autonomous communities, each with its own traditional leadership structure, lineage history, and cultural heritage. These communities collectively form the Okrika Local Government Area in Rivers State but maintain internal autonomy through their traditional institutions, most notably the Amanyanabo (traditional ruler) and Council of Chefs.

The major autonomous communities in Okrika include:

1. Kirike Town: This is the historical center of the Okrika people. It contains several wards and compounds (war canoe houses) that trace their origins to the earliest settlers of the area. Kirike Town remains the political and cultural seat of the Okrika Kingdom.
2. Ogbogbo: A distinct autonomous community known for its fishing settlements and waterfront economy. Ogbogbo maintains its own chieftaincy structures while participating in broader Okrika affairs.
3. Ibaka Town: A distinct autonomous community known for its fishing settlements and waterfront economy like other clans, maintains its own chieftaincy structures while participating in broader Okrika affairs.
4. Ogu (Ogu Community): Although often associated with Okrika culturally and historically, Ogu is an autonomous community with its own Amanyanabo and governance institutions. It shares close kinship, marital, and cultural ties with Okrika.
5. Bolo (Bolo Community): Bolo is another autonomous group with a long-established traditional authority system. It plays a key role in the southern part of the Okrika cultural zone, maintaining strong historical links with Okrika Town and other neighbouring communities.
6. Ogoloma (Ogoloma Community): Located near the Port Harcourt axis, Ogoloma is an autonomous community known for its strategic location, commercial activities, and its own distinct cultural institutions.

=== Structure and Function of Autonomous Communities ===
Each autonomous community in Okrika:

- Operates through a traditional governance system headed by an Amanyanabo and supported by chiefs, war canoe houses, and community elders.
- Maintains communal identity through festivals, traditional titles, linguistic variations, and ancestral heritage.
- Exercises control over internal cultural practices, land administration, conflict resolution, and community development.

While they function independently, these communities cooperate under the larger framework of the Okrika Kingdom, particularly on matters of culture, inter-community relations, and representation within Rivers State.

== Language ==
The language spoken by Okrika people is Okirika language. The language is mutually intelligible with its neighboring dialects Ibani and Kalabari.

== Religion ==
Historically, the Okrika people of old were polytheist believing in several gods and deities. Others were animist who believed in many spirits including marine spirits and in the spirits of their ancestors. Finibeso was considered the chief god of the ancient Okrika people and his priest where most reverend among other priests. The Fenibeso shrine was most sacred and divine. Traditionally, no restrictions were imposed on the worship of any god.

In modern Okrika, Christian religion has emerged as the dominant religion and the St. Peter's Cathedral is the most prominent religious building in Okrika. Traditional religion however still exists side by side with Christianity.

There are several Christian denominations in Okrika today. Some of the Christian denominations in Okrika are as follows:

The Anglican Church, the first African Church (FAC), the Roman Catholic Church, the Christ Army Church (CAC), the Assemblies of God Church, the Redeemed Christian Church of God (RCCG), Three Cross, Apostolic Church, Deeper Life, Seventh-Day Adventist Church, Greater Evangelism, El Shaidai Bible Church, Church of God Mission, The Living Faith Church (Winners Chapel), Christ Embassy, Cherubim and Seraphim, Salvation Ministries, Brotherhood of the Cross and Star etc.

== Government ==
Okrika Local Government Area has its headquarters located in Okrika town with the districts of Kalio, Ogoloma, Okirika and Ogan. A Chief is the head of a War Canoe House; for example, the Orufingbe War Canoe house of a Ngeme Biri and a War Canoe house is made up of Furos (Families).

== Economic ==
Okrika LGA is rich in deposits of crude oil and natural gas with the activities of oil mining and refining companies contributing immensely to the economy of the area. Also, Fishing is another popular economic activity engaged in the by the Okrika people as with the area's many rivers and tributaries making them being rich in sea food. Farming is another occupation that the Okrika people are known for with the cultivation of several crops which include cassava, oil palm, yam, and plantain.

Before the onset of oil and gas activities, the Okrika people were and are still known for fishing, farming and trading; these economic activities sustain their livelihood.

== Environmental problems ==
The Okrika kingdom is faced with a serious threat of Environmental pollution that is causing unmitigated disaster to the land of Okrika local government area of Rivers state. The daily outcry or agony of the Okrika people is that they are in the grip of death and short life span as a result. Their aquatic foods such as freshwater fishes, periwinkles and oysters are going into extinction because of oil-related chemicals from the Port – Harcourt Refinery. Air pollution is another hazard in the area as it is caused by the flaring of gas in the oil and gas refinery which could cause large quantity in greenhouse warming of gases that could lead to acidic rain and ozone layer depletion, meanwhile the men production capabilities are weakened by this activity. Also, the Okrika kingdom aquatic life suffers greater threat of species extinction due to the continuous spill of oil mostly caused by bunkering and pipeline vandalism in the region and this results to poor economic sustainability as a large number of residents and indigenes are Fishermen. The aquatic life suffers firstly from the emanation of oil waste product that comes from the refinery. It has been on a continuous spill that goes straight into the river and it has been spilling long before there was any bunkering or oil vandalism.

As of March 2017, residents have complained of soot in the air due to the destruction of makeshift illegal refineries that have sprouted all over the state.
