= David Lyon (Nigerian politician) =

Nigerian politician

- Born: David Lyon Perewonrimi; 20 December 1970 (age 55); Olugbobiri, Southern Ijaw, Bayelsa State, Nigeria
- Political party: All Progressives Congress

David Lyon Perewonrimi (born 20 December 1970) is a Nigerian politician and the former governorship candidate of the All Progressives Congress in the 2019 Bayelsa gubernatorial election. He was declared winner of the election, but a day to his swearing-in as governor, his election was invalidated by the Supreme Court of Nigeria. The Apex court ruled that his running mate Degi Eremienyo Wangagra submitted a fake certificate to the Independent National Electoral Commission, while ordering that Douye Diri of People's Democratic Party who came second in the election be issued a certificate of return, which would make him governor-elect.

== Early life and education ==
Lyon was born to Mr and Mrs Arukubu Lyon Ekpeke of Abebiri family of Eubiri compound, Olugbobiri community in Olodiama clan, Southern Ijaw Local Government Area, Bayelsa State, Nigeria. From 1978 to 1983, he attended his primary education at Saint Gabriel's State School Olugbobiri and secondary education at Community secondary school, Olugbobiri, from 1984 to 1988. He went to Rivers State College of Education for his National Certificate of Education (NCE) in Mathematics and Chemistry.

== Career ==
Lyon started his career as a foreman in Western Geophysical Company Limited, before moving on to become the chief executive officer (CEO) of Darlon Oil and Gas Nigeria Limited, Darlon Group Nigeria Limited and Arutex and Sons Nigeria Limited.

Lyon joined politics in the Third Republic, as a member of the defunct, National Republican Congress (NRC). He contested and won a councilorship election at Ward 4 in Southern Ijaw, but the military incursion aborted his tenure in 1997. He went on to become a founding member of the People's Democratic Party (PDP) in Southern Ijaw. He was later appointed as the Caretaker Committee Chairman of Apoi Olodiama Local Government Development Center in 2000.

In 2015, he decamped to the All Progressives Congress and contested the Bayelsa State governorship primary election in September 2019, where he emerged as the party's candidate.

On 18 November 2019, he contested in the governorship elections and was declared the governor-elect of Bayelsa State by the Independent National Electoral Commission, INEC.

On 13 February 2020, a day prior to his swearing-in as governor, his election was invalidated by the Supreme Court of Nigeria. The Apex court ruled that his running mate Degi Eremienyo Wangagra submitted a fake certificate to the Independent National Electoral Commission, while ordering that Douye Diri of People's Democratic Party who came second in the election be issued a certificate of return, which would make him governor-elect.
