= Timi Alaibe =

Nigerian politician (Born 1962)

Managing Director of NDDC
- In office 2007 – 2009; Executive Director in charge of Finance and Administration of NDDC
- In office 2001–2007

Personal details
- Born: Timi Alaibe; 10 June 1962 (age 64) Opokuma, Bayelsa State

Timi Alaibe (born June 10, 1962) is a Nigerian technocrat, businessman and politician from Bayelsa State. He is a former Managing Director of the Niger Delta Development Commission (NDDC)

== Early life and family ==
Ndutimi (Timi) Alaibe is a Nigerian technocrat, businessman and politician from Bayelsa State, Nigeria. He is the former Managing Director of the Niger Delta Development Commission (NDDC).

He was born on the 10th day of June,1962 in the Ijaw village of Igbainwari in Opokuma, Bayelsa State, Nigeria, to the family of late Pa Emmanuel Mmadu Alaibe. He is the third of five children.

His early life was quite tumultuous and difficult as his parents were of modest, but hardworking background. However, despite his humble beginnings, young Timi encouraged by his parents.

When not in school, Timi would accompany his parents to the farm a trip that entailed crossing the river in crude wooden canoe.

When he is not attending to chores or helping his parents in the farm, young Timi spent much of his childhood, with his age mates, frolicking in the local village river, and going fishing with locally made fishing rods and hooks. The bond of friendship he forged with his childhood playmates during those early years of his life are still as strong today.

Despite his having achieved great success in life, Timi Alaibe is a man that has never forgotten where he came from. He is purported to feeling most at home in his village of Igbainwari in Opokuma.

== Education ==
=== Primary education ===
Timi Alaibe began his elementary education at Isoko Primary School, Marine Beach, Apapa, Lagos from 1967 to 1970. When his parents moved to Port Harcourt in 1970, he was enrolled at Christ the King School, Oromenike, Port Harcourt between 1970 through 1973. There, he earned his First School Leaving Certificate. Upon completing his primary education, young Timi returned to his village of Igbanwari in Opokuma.

=== Secondary education ===
He enrolled at the Government Secondary School, Kaiama, in Bayelsa State for his secondary education, from 1974 through 1979, where he earned his West African School Certificate. Academically, Timi Alaibe was an exceptionally bright student distinguishing himself in both English and mathematics.

Timi still managed to graduate with honors, despite the fact that he had to cross the local river on canoe to attend school at Kaiama—a testament to his tenacity and dedication to learning.

He never allowed his underprivileged background to hinder his academic progress. It has been recounted by those who knew him well during his childhood days, that even at an early age. Timi nurtured a single minded determination to succeed in life.

=== Tertiary education ===
Timi Alaibe soon gained admission into the River State University of Science and Technology, from where he graduated with a Bachelors of Science (BSc) degree in Accounting.

After a brief professional career, Timi Alaibe felt a need to enhance his academic credentials. He figured that a post graduate degree would further equip him for the corporate world.

He applied to, and gained admission into the Obafemi Awolowo University (OAU) Ile Ife, Nigeria for his post graduate studies in Business Administration. He obtained a master's degree in Business Administration (MBA) form Obafemi Awolowo University.

== Career ==
Timi Alaibe is a seasoned banker with private sector experience of over twenty five years of service.

He is an entrepreneur who has established and managed successful businesses which has created thousands of jobs for Nigerians across the country.

His public service experience has spanned more than ten years.

He was one of the Board of Directors in Niger Delta Development Commission (NDDC) from 2001 to 2004.

=== Private sector ===
Upon completion of his master's degree program, Timi Aaibe returned to professional life at Peat Marwick Ani Ogunde and Co (now KPMG) initially as a trainee accountant.

In 1986, he joined African Continental Bank. He started as Head of Operations and rose to become branch manager at Okrika branch, in River State worked at different positions at the Bank for several years, before deciding to move on to other professional challenges.

He then soon secured a position at the All States Trust Bank in 1991, as Assistant Manager in charge of risk management and credit control.

A year later, in 1992, he was appointed as the Vice President of the Cosmopolitan Bancshares Ltd a top tier finance and investment company.

In 1994, he joined Societe Generale Bank Ltd (now Heritage Bank PLC) as a manager, Corporate Banking Division. He soon rose to the position of Senior Manager. He subsequently played a critical role in the bank's corporate repositioning project, in 1996. He served as the bank's assistant general manager in 1998 and then its General Manager, Corporate and Investment Banking, in 2000.

He is currently the Chairman of Zomay Group of companies, a wholly Nigerian company with interest in Dredging, Civil Construction and Offshore Marine Logistics, and Support services. He is also the Chairman of Juanita Hotel, Port Harcourt.

=== Public sector ===
His foray into the public sector came in 2001, when the then Nigerian President, Olusegun Obasanjo noticing his managerial and leadership capabilities, appointed him as the Executive Director, in charge of Finance and Administration, at the then newly created Nigerian Federal Government's Niger Delta Development Commission (NDDC). His office instituted an effective and efficient governance structure that guided the management of the commission.

He was instrumental in the establishment of a prudent fiscal regime that ensured efficient management of the financial resources that were allocated to the commission.

Along with his colleagues, he set in motion a coordinated response mechanism to address the short, medium and long-term challenges of the Niger Delta. These included integrated Regional Development Master Plan Interim Action Plan for key projects in the Niger Delta States, as well as programmes for skill acquisition and re-orientation and empowerment of youths in the region.

Due to his passion and dedication to ending violence in the Niger Delta region through empowerment, Timi Alaibe was on more than one occasion appointed as the interim (acting) Managing Director of NDDC, during his time at the commission.

Then, in April 2007, he was finally appointed as the principle Managing Director and Chief Executive Officer of the Commission a position he held until April 2009 when his tenure expired.

== Political involvement ==
He has been an activist champion of nonviolent solution to the problems of the Niger Delta region of Nigeria. His effective leadership role in the peaceful resolution of the Niger militancy crisis earned him national accolade and admiration, and a significant following among his core constituents—especially in his home State of Bayelsa.

== Social activism ==
=== Demobilisation ===
He was saddled with the more challenging task of nurturing the Demobilisation, Rehabilitating and Re-integration of the ex-combatants back into society. His immediate constituents were 20,192 warring youth who accepted the Amnesty Proclamation in 2009. He took the challenge with the zeal of priesthood. Although he held the office for about a year, he put in place a five-year framework for the efficient implementation of the Demobilisation, Demobilisation and Reintegration Program. Today, as the Federal Government reflects on some of the initial successes of this program, Timi Alaibe stands tall as the midwife of that process.

=== Niger Delta Regional Development Master Plan ===
Timi Alaibe believes that the path to peace and security for both the Niger Delta and our dear Country is for us to confront and reconcile ourselves with our obstructive structural contradictions. He believes that a Marshall Plan type approach for massive infrastructural and economic development of the Niger Delta in line with the Niger Delta Regional Development Master Plan and the 2008 Technical Committee Report supported by a coherent Niger Delta policy will fundamentally address some of the underlying grievances. He was a member of the Niger Delta Technical Committee appointed by the President Yar’Adua administration in to collate, review and distill the various reports, suggestions and recommendations on the Niger Delta from the Willinks Commission Report (1958) to the present, and propose a summary of recommendations that will enable the Federal Government achieve sustainable development, peace, human and environmental security in the Niger Delta Region.

== Awards ==
Alaibe holds the National Honours of the Commander of the Order of the Niger (CON).
