= Henry Seriake Dickson =

Nigerian politician (born 1966)

Senator for Bayelsa West
- Incumbent
- Assumed office 15 December 2020
- Preceded by: Lawrence Ewhrudjakpo

11th Governor of Bayelsa State
- In office 14 February 2012 – 14 February 2020
- Deputy: Gboribiogha John Jonah
- Preceded by: Nestor Binabo
- Succeeded by: Douye Diri

Member of the House of Representatives of Nigeria
- In office 5 June 2007 – 13 February 2012

Attorney General of Bayelsa State
- In office 2006–2007
- Governor: Goodluck Jonathan

Personal details
- Born: 28 January 1966 (age 60) Sagbama, Eastern Region, Nigeria (now in Bayelsa State)
- Party: Nigeria Democratic Congress
- Spouse: Rachael Dickson
- Education: Rivers State University of Science and Technology (LL.B.); Nigerian Law School
- Occupation: Politician, lawyer

Henry Seriake Dickson CON (born 28 January 1966) is a Nigerian lawyer and politician. He has been the Senator representing Bayelsa West senatorial District since 2020 in the 9th National Assembly and also from 2023 in the 10th Assembly. He was the governor of Bayelsa State from 14 February 2012 to 14 February 2020. He was a member of the House of Representatives from 2007 until 2012.

== Early life and education ==
Henry Seriake Dickson was born on 28 January 1966 in Toru-Orua Town of Sagbama Local Government Area of Bayelsa State, Nigeria. He is a descendant of the King Kapadia Royal House of Tarakiri Kingdom.

Dickson attended Kolobiriowei Primary School, Toru-Orua, from 1972 to 1978, where he obtained his First School Leaving Certificate and proceeded to Government Secondary School, Toru-Ebeni, in 1978 to 1983 where he got his West African School Certificate (WASSCE/GCE).

Dickson enrolled in the Rivers State University of Science and Technology, Port Harcourt, to study law in 1988. He earned his LL.B in 1992. In 1993, he went on to earn his Bachelors in Law from the Nigerian Law School and was also called to the Nigerian Bar shortly thereafter.

== Legal career ==
Henry Seriake Dickson joined the Nigeria Police Force in 1986. Upon his graduation from law school in 1993, he was appointed a cadet assistant superintendent of police, from where he proceeded to Nigeria Police Academy in Kano for Officers' Training. During his training, he resigned from the police force after nearly a decade in the field, in favour of practicing law.

As a lawyer, he worked with Serena David Dokubo & Co. as an associate solicitor from 1994 to 1995 and moved to Aluko & Oyebode, a prominent law firm in Lagos, also as an associate solicitor, between 1995 and 1996. He founded Seriake Dickson & Co. in Port Harcourt and later Yenagoa, serving as its managing solicitor from 1996 to 2006. He was elected pioneer publicity secretary of the Nigerian Bar Association (NBA) Yenagoa, serving in this role from 1996 to 1998.

== Political career ==
=== Alliance for Democracy ===
Dickson began his political career as a member of Alliance for Democracy (AD) (Nigeria) and was elected as the Bayelsa State chapter chairman of the party from 1998 to 2000. The political party produced a senator representing Bayelsa West, a member of the House of Representatives representing Sagbama - Ekeremor Federal Constituency and three members of the State House of Assembly from Brass Local Government. After his tenure as chairman elapsed, he was elected national legal adviser of the Alliance for Democracy and served in that position between 2000 and 2002.

=== Attorney General of Bayelsa State (2006–2007) ===
In January 2006, Dickson was appointed the attorney-general and commissioner for justice of Bayelsa State (2006 to 2007) by the then Governor, Dr. Goodluck Ebele Jonathan GCFR.

As attorney general, he was a member of the Body of Benchers, a member of the Council of Legal Education and vice chairman of the State Advisory Judicial Service Commission.

=== House of Representatives ===
Dickson was elected to the National Assembly's House of Representatives in 2007 and was appointed chairman, the House Committee on Justice and member of several committees including Defence, National Security, Intelligence and Foreign Affairs

In April 2011, he was elected for a second term, a then-unaccomplished feat in his constituency. In his second term, he was appointed Chairman House Committee on Special Duties.

At the National Assembly, he sponsored/co-sponsored several bills, which include:

- The Economic and Financial Crimes Commission (Establishment) Act (Amendment) Bill, 2009.
- The Corrupt Practices and Other Related Offences (Establishment) Act (Amendment) Bill, 2009.
- The Political Parties(Internal Democracy)Bill, 2008.
- The Constitution Alteration Bill, 2010.
- The Legislative Houses, Powers and Privileges Act (Amendment) Bill, 2009.
- The Evidence Bill, 2009.
- The Kidnapping and Hostage Taking (Prohibition) Bill, 2009.
- The Freedom of Information Bill, 2007.
- The Court Ordered Elections (Streamlining of Tenure of Office) Bill, 2008.
- The Prevention of Terrorism Bill, 2009.
- Transmission of power by a President or Governor amendment Bill (section 145), 2010

=== Senate ===
On 5 December 2020, Dickson won the Bayelsa West Senatorial Bye-Election with over 80% of the total votes and was sworn in as Senator into the 9th Senate replacing Senator Lawrence Ewhrudjakpo on 15 December 2020.

He won his re-election bid to the senate on 25 February 2023 and was named the chairman, of the Senate committee on ecology/ climate change of the 10th senate on 8 August 2023.

On 28 May 2023, Dickson was conferred with Commander of the Order of the Niger (CON) by Former President Buhari. Dickson was also awarded Excellence in Environmental Leadership Award 2023 by the Global Initiative for Climate and Environmental Sustenance in August 2023

== Gubernatorial career ==
In the 2012 Bayelsa State gubernatorial election, the Independent National Electoral Commission reported that Henry Seriake Dickson won over 90% of the votes. They went on to say that this helped in "further strengthening the PDP's stronghold on power there since Jonathan became president."

Shortly after taking over gubernatorial duties, Dickson said that he was "painfully transiting to the executive arm of government." He indicated that he may return to the National Assembly someday.

Dickson was re-elected Governor of Bayelsa State in the 2015 Bayelsa State gubernatorial election. On 14 February 2020, Dickson officially handed over to Douye Diri as the Governor of Bayelsa State.

=== Key legislation ===
While in office, Governor Dickson sent over 50 bills to the Bayelsa State House of Assembly (BSHA) including the State Transparency Law, Thanksgiving Law and the Judicial Autonomy Law for which he has received commendations from the Attorney General of the Federation and the Honorable Chief Justice of Nigeria.

Governor Dickson enacted the Right to Education Law, which obliges parents, guardians of children and the state government to ensure that children are schooled up to the age of 18.

=== Education ===
Through the Right to Education Law, Henry Seriake Dickson instituted free and compulsory educations in Bayelsa State for students in primary and secondary schools. Dickson's administration also introduced compulsory boarding education and constructed 13 boarding schools, the first of their kind in the state. This included the launch of the Ijaw National Academy in 2017 (renamed as the Captain Samuel Timinipre Owonaro Academy in 2020), which began with 1,000 students and as of May 2026 had grown to over 1,500 students on full scholarship. Per its namesake, the school aims to foster young leadership from the Ijaw ethnic group, accepting community members in Bayelsa and the five other states where the Ijaw predominate: Rivers, Edo, Akwa Ibom, Ondo and Delta. As part of Dickson's boarding school system program, his administration built more than 25 constituency secondary schools.

Dickson's education reforms were attributed to Bayelsa's greatly improved ranking in the education development index of Nigeria's 36 states. Whereas the state had ranked 28th upon Dickson's election in 2012, by 2014 it ranked among the top five states in the West African Examination Council (WAEC) index, a position it maintained consistently for four years. Similarly, in 2017 Bayelsa placed third in the National Examination Council (NECO), which highlighted the students' excellence in the subjects English, Mathematics and Science.

The Dickson led Restoration government also established the University of Africa, Toru-Orua and the Bayelsa Medical University, Bayelsa State Polytechnic, Aleibiri and other non degree awarding tertiary institutions such as Bayelsa School of Agriculture, Bayelsa State Sports Academy Asoama, the first in Nigeria, The Bayelsa International Institute of Catering and Hospitality, Yenagoa, Bayelsa Driving School to take care of the teeming population of students in need of world class tertiary education. These institutions are affiliated to several world class universities.

The Government of Governor Dickson also made huge investments to upgrade the facilities and programs in the Niger Delta University, the Bayelsa State College of Education as well as the Bayelsa State School of Nursing and Midwifery and Bayela State School of Health Technology of which they all have full accreditation from their respected regulatory bodies.

Governor Dickson by law established the Bayelsa Education Development Trust Fund, the first in the country, continuing a passion for education that has currently made Bayelsa the educational hub and epicenter of human capital development in Nigeria especially with the establishment of several institutions of learning.

Just like the Education Trust Fund, Governor Dickson introduced the Bayelsa State Student Loan board, backed by law to give loans to deserving Bayelsa students who require financial assistance to pursue their education with their certificates as collateral. Dickson says that this was done to ensure that every Bayelsa student has the opportunity to pursue their education without restrictions.

The establishment of the Bayelsa State Teachers Training and Certification Board backed by Law, another innovation to ensure the continuous training and retraining of all teachers in Bayelsa. The law provides for certification of teachers to be eligible to be employed for teaching in Bayelsa and that program has since commenced. These key policies as well as the legal framework have received commendation by the National Council on Education and has been recommended as the benchmark for revitalizing the educational sector by all states in Nigeria.

Governor Dickson built over 500 residential quarters for headmasters and teachers of primary schools in several rural communities to solve accommodation problems, Governor Dickson also built and renovated several primary schools. Audtors have revealed that Governor Dickson's restoration project spent over N80 billion in educational infrastructure in his 8 years as Governor of Bayelsa State.

=== Healthcare ===
Governor Dickson made unprecedented provisions of healthcare facilities in the state in line with his restoration agenda. He built the Bayelsa Diagnostics Centre, The Bayelsa State Forensics Centre and the Bayelsa Drug Mart to tackle incidents of fake drugs in the state both commissioned by former President Olusegun Obasanjo. He also built the fully equipped 100 bed Bayelsa Specialist Hospital which is renowned for its world class facilities and built 80 bed hospitals in Kaiama, Sagbama, Ekeremor and Southern Ijaw local governments. Governor Dickson also completely refurbished and equipped the general hospital in Brass. Governor Dickson's plan as part of his restoration agenda was to build a health centre and health workers' quarters in all 105 political wards in the state. He, however, completed this in 83 wards under the implementation of the Bayelsa State Primary Healthcare Board inaugurated by his administration. Governor Dickson also announced a special allowance for pregnant women who registered and attended antenatal in the state upon verification. Governor Dickson received wide recognition and praise for his work in the Maternal and Child Healthcare by several healthcare professional groups in Nigeria. By the end of his administration, there was a significant drop in maternal and infant mortality in Bayelsa State, from being one of the highest in the country to being the least in the South South.

Governor Dickson's legacy in healthcare is cemented in the establishment of Bayelsa State Health Insurance Scheme backed up by law which has become a reference point among health administrators in the country. The board runs one of the most successful health insurance schemes in Nigeria which has become a template for several health insurance programs of other states that visit Bayelsa to understudy the scheme. The scheme currently has over 100,000 beneficiaries, the scheme has also successfully funded 1,771 surgeries in Bayelsa since its establishment.

=== Economy ===
Governor Dickson expanded the Bayelsa State Economy which laid the foundation for bringing prosperity to Bayelsa people. Governor Dickson created the Bayelsa State Micro finance Bank, the first in Bayelsa known as Izon Ibe Microfinance Bank duly licensed by the Central Bank of Nigeria with branches in every Local Government headquarters in the state. The purpose of the bank was for people in rural communities and MSES to be able to access loans. Governor Dickson built the largest Cassava processing plant in Nigeria to enable out-growers to have loans to plant cassavas that will feed the plant with cassavas. Governor Dickson also built a massive poultry and turned Bayelsa to the center of aquaculture taking advantage of its natural topography and history but with the current issues of river pollution which has largely affected a predominantly fishing people, Governor Dickson set up an Aquaculture Village in Yenegwe which has 500 ponds of 50 by 20 meters equipped with processing units, feed mills, storage facilities, processing plants, hatchery and other facilities such as cafeteria, school on an over 127 hectares of land. Several young people were trained in Songhai farm and a number of them have already began work at the fish ponds. A second aquaculture village sited at Igeibiri in Southern Ijaw will host 1000 ponds. Land for this purpose was acquired and cleared with Local Government Areas designated and discussions reached an advanced stage with the Central Bank on its NIRSAL supervised Anchor Borrowers Program. In addition, two mechanized fish farms were given to contractors to build, one in Ogbogero in Yenagoa LGA to an Israeli Firm, the second one in Angalabiri; which has been completed.

Governor Dickson signed a law declaring all land in Bayelsa as urban and subject to the Governor's Certificate of Occupancy to free up the wealth that has been frozen in the state by rural land owners. Dickson revolutionized the land administration system by computerizing land administration in Bayelsa. The Bayelsa Geographic Information Service established by law which guarantees that Certificate of Occupancy will be processed and presented within 30 days. Dickson's administration partnered with landlords to number all buildings and plots in the state capital to enable revenue collection and effective man management and administration.

Governor Dickson's biggest impact in the Bayelsa economy is perhaps driving the state's internal generated revenue from a meager ₦50 million per month in 2012 at the beginning of his administration to ₦1.2 billion per month as at the end of his administration through several economic reforms. In addition, he employed over 5000 young Bayelsa graduates into the civil service, and implemented policies to stop casualization of workers.

=== Infrastructure ===
Governor Dickson advanced infrastructural upgrades in the state, including in the construction of several roads and bridges. He oversaw completion of the ₦55 billion Bayelsa International Airport, which commenced operations on 15 February 2019. Governor Dickson started and finished several road and infrastructural projects including

• Completion of the Toru-Ebeni Bridge project

• Completion of the Etegwe-Tombia-Amassoma Road with eight bridges

• Construction of the Bayelsa Central Senatorial Road project

• Construction of the Bayelsa West Senatorial Road project

• Yenagoa Restoration Flyover

• Dualization of the Road Safety Road

• Dualization of the Hospital Road

• Dualization of the Imiringi-Elebele Road

• Dualization of the Azikoro Road

• Dualization of the Diette Spiff Road

• Construction of four new secretariat annexes

• Dualization of the Isaac Boro Road

• Renovation of the Old State Secretariat

• New Government House Car Park

• Work on the Ogbia-Nembe Road

• The Agge Deep Seaport

• Rural electrification projects to link communities to the National Grid

• Completion of Transparency Plazas

• Construction of the New Governor and Deputy Governor's Office complex

• Construction (Dualization) of the Igbogene-GloryLand Drive

• New Okaka Low-Cost Housing Estate

• Construction of Boro Town

• Multi-Door Court House

• Rehabilitation/Upgrading of the Samson Siasia Stadium

• Construction of the Nembe City Sports Stadium

• Renovation/Remodeling Gabriel Okara Cultural centre

• Reconstruction of the Bayelsa State Traditional Rulers Council secretariat.

=== Women and Youth ===
Dickson pursued an empowerment of women and youth in Bayelsa which was unprecedented at the time. A high number of women and youths were given sensitive government positions at local councils and state level. At one time in his administration, all Vice Chairmen in the local councils in Bayelsa were women. Before the end of his tenure, Dickson implemented a special affirmative action that led to 40% of elected Councillors being women in the last local government council elections in June 2019 superintended by him. Bayelsa had the highest number of female appointees in Government during his administration including Commissioners, Special Advisers, Senior Special Assistants, Board Members and others. Governor Dickson recruited, sponsored and supported more women in elective offices in the State and National Assembly. A large percentage of youths were mentored, trained and given several sensitive positions at state and local government level creating sustainable manpower in the process and giving them a sense of direction and purpose. Governor Dickson set up the Henry Seriake Dickson Foundation which would further train and mentor young people in Bayelsa, Niger Delta and in Nigeria.

=== Environment ===
As governor, Dickson gave priority to environmental protection in the Bayelsa State and the Niger Delta, which has witnessed decades of environmental degradation, largely owing to oil companies operating in the area. He advanced scientific surveys assessing the adverse impact of the oil companies' activities, and sponsored awareness campaigns such as the Rise for Bayelsa campaign. He oversaw the establishment of the first ever of Bayelsa State Oil and Environmental Commission in March 2019, chaired by the Archbishop of York Rt Honorable Dr John Sentamu with a high level panel of international experts and was inaugurated by Governor Dickson. The committee's commission of inquiry submitted an interim report to Governor Dickson in November 2019. The Commission's final 211-page report, titled "An Environmental Genocide: Counting the Human Cost of Oil in Bayelsa, Nigeria", elaborated on the environmental effects of 60 years of oil exploration, especially from pollution caused. The Bayelsa State Oil and Environmental Commission's report was considered the first major step by any government of a Nigerian state to draw public and policy awareness on environmental risks, the impact on oil companies and the challenges to communities living in the affected area, and has encouraged stakeholders to advocate that the federal government implements report's recommendations. Beyond his term, Dickson continues to be a major voice in the environment and has made that one of the major concerns of the Henry Seriake Dickson Foundation.

=== Security ===
Governor Dickson started his administration in 2012 by addressing the issues of security which had crippled the economic and social life in Bayelsa and led to an exodus of companies from the state. Governor Dickson set up operation Doo-Akpo (peaceful life) which was approved by the President for a special contingent from the Nigeria Police Force Headquarters in Abuja. The deployed Officers were trained and retrained at a special base set up for them and special allowances with daily feeding and medicare were also approved to motivate them. Governor Dickson also provided high tech vehicles and gunboats specially designed with communication devices. Governor Dickson also built the Bayesla State Command and Control centre named the General Owoye Azazi Building which is equipped with modern communication and security devices and a 911 Emergency and fully computerized distress call center which records calls and responses and ensures 4 minute response time. This initiative won Dickson several local and international awards on security as the most security conscious Governor. Governor Dickson also built special checkpoints around Yenegoa, the state capital and in other strategic locations in the state, he introduced a State Wide communication program linked to the Security Command and Control Room to communicate directly with all deployed security assets, vehicles and gunboats in any part of the state. Governor Dickson also introduced a special motorized patrol team as part of the Operation Doo-Akpo. Governor Dickson also set up the Bayelsa State Vigilante Service and strengthened the Bayelsa Volunteers to ensure that Youth and Community leaders were brought into the security architecture. Governor Dickson also built several facilities to support Law Enforcement in the state such as Police Divisions in Yenagoa and Sagbama, The Counter Terrorism Unit office and the Special protection unit, the Nigerian Army Engineering Regiment in Toru-Ora, The Nigerian Navy Base also in Toru-Ora, the only Naval presence between Warri and Onitsha. Dickson donated facilities for the take off of the Nigerian Regiment Training School, The SSS Training school and The Commando Training School. Governor Dickson also donated secondary schools to all Armed Forces present in the state. Governor Dickson also donated a building to serve as the headquarters of the Nigerian Civil Defence in Yenagoa. Bayelsa State was named the safest state in South South Nigeria by Police records during his administration.

=== Ijaw Nationalism and Integration ===
Governor Dickson promised during his campaigns and inaugural address an aggressive mobilization and defense of Ijaw people split into the 6 states in Nigeria. He christened Bayelsa as the Jerusalem of the ijaw nation, a description that eventually stuck. He created the ministry of Ijaw national affairs and appointed the first non Bayelsa commissioner cabinet member from Delta state, the first president of Ijaw Youth Congress as pioneers to head the new ministry and several appointees numbering over 100 from across states of Ijaw origins across the south south. Scholarships and employment opportunities were also available to them. Governor Dickson in the midst of unfair national criticism established by law the Bayelsa state flag, coat of arms and an anthem or state song and insisted it was an inherent exercise of the federalist powers of the state, an argument that eventually ended the debate. Today the Bayelsa colors and coat of arms have stayed as an integral part of Bayelsa-Ijaw identity with Governor Dickson saying it is an important aspect of cultural identity. He also made Bayelsa the center of gravity of Niger Delta issues as well as the natural place to host meetings of geo-ethnic nationalities and platforms seeking equality in Nigeria. This is reflected in the set up of the flagship Ijaw National Academy by Governor Dickson which has over 1,500 students on full scholarship with beneficiaries drawn from Ijaw communities in six states of Rivers, Edo, Akwa Ibom, Ondo and Delta. Governor Dickson built and commissioned the Ijaw National Heroes Memorial Park to honour Ijaw people who have excelled in public service to Nigeria while advancing the Ijaw struggle. In May 2013, Dickson brought back the remains of Late Major Isaac Adaka Boro to Bayelsa to be buried and a befitting mausoleum was built in his memory. Late General Owoye Andrew Azazi, Ijaw Nation's first 4 star Military General who served Nigeria as one time Chief of Army Staff, Chief of Defense Staff and National Security Adviser was also buried at the park and has a mausoleum built in his memory. Other prominent Ijaw icons who have been laid to rest or have mausoleums built to honor them at the Ijaw National Heroes Park are Chief Melford Okilo, Harold Dappa Biriye, Gabriel Okara, Rex Jim Lawson, Rear Admiral Bossman Soroh, Ernest Okoli, Reverend Ockiya, the first man to translate the Bible in to Nembe Language and other associates of Major Isaac Adaka Boro. Governor Dickson set up a historical committee, Ijaw History project, coordinated by a State Historian to oversee and determine those eligible to be immortalized at the Ijaw National Heroes Memorial Park.

=== Promotion of Religion ===
Governor Dickson is an ardent practicing Christian and is known to popularly use the quote "He serveth God well, who serveth man". Dickson says his faith is the basis for his life and political service and that the whole essence of his political career is anchored on the statement "Service to man is service to God". This statement is engraved on the emblems of the two Universities he established as Governor, The University of Africa and the Bayelsa Medical University. Governor Dickson's administration began with a statewide fasting and prayer in 2012 and the first bill he sent to the Bayelsa State House of Assembly was to proclaim a Bayelsa State Thanksgiving Law, the only state in Nigeria to do so as at the time. This bill gave birth to November 2as the official Thanksgiving Day and a public holiday in Bayelsa State, this has held for 8 years of his administration. Governor Dickson started a daily morning devotional service in the Bayelsa State Government House and never missed a service. He also instituted weekly prayers for all Women in the state every Wednesday which was chaired and coordinated by his wife and first lady of Bayelsa State, Rachael Dickson. Governor Dickson started a monthly praise night which he never missed throughout his 8 years in office. All these religious precepts he instituted are still being practiced in Bayelsa state as a part of the religious culture. Governor Dickson built the 10,000 seating capacity Bayelsa State Ecumenical Center, the largest by any state Government in Nigeria which was commissioned by Pastor E. A. Adeboye of the Redeemed Christian Church of God in the presence of Vice President Yemi Osinbajo. The Ecumenical Center currently serves as the quarters of the Christian Association of Nigeria, Bayelsa Branch and is managed by a Dickson-inaugurated board set up by law to manage it. Governor Dickson also approved an office space in the Ecumenical Center for Nigeria Prays led by General Yakubu Gowon. Governor Dickson maintained an open mindedness by showing tolerance to religious persuasions other than Christianity.

== See also ==
- List of governors of Bayelsa State
