= Wilberforce Island =

Island in Nigeria

Wilberforce Island is an island located in Bayelsa State, Nigeria, covering a total area of approximately 23,197.05 hectares (89.5643 mi^{2}). This area includes 446.76 hectares (1.7250 mi^{2}) of water, with the remaining 22,750.29 hectares (87.8394 mi^{2}) consisting of residential areas, landfills, beaches, forests, farmlands, and vegetation.

The island hosts key facilities such as the Bayelsa International Airport and the Niger Delta University. While the airport is located on the island, it is not in Amassoma, where the Niger Delta University is situated.

Wilberforce Island stretches across two local government areas: Southern Ijaw and Yenagoa. It includes several towns, such as Amassoma, Agudama, Oguobiri, and others, contributing to the island's diverse landscape and communities.
