= Bayelsa International Airport =

Airport in Nigeria

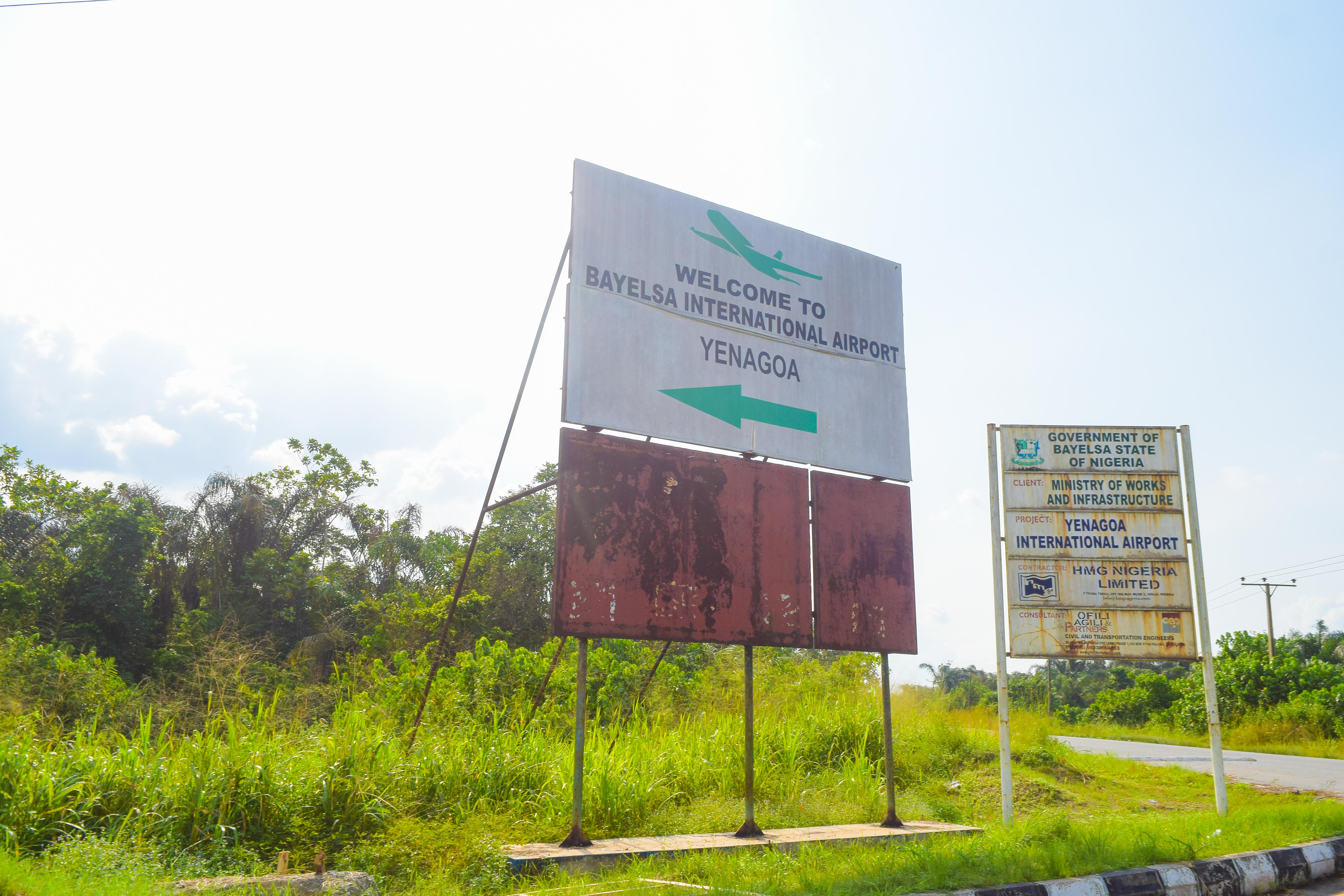
- Signpost to Bayelsa International Airport, Yenagoa, Bayelsa
- IATA: none; ICAO: DNBY

Summary
- Airport type: Public
- Owner: Bayelsa State Government
- Operator: Bayelsa Airport Company Limited
- Serves: Yenagoa, Bayelsa
- Location: Wilberforce Island, Nigeria
- Time zone: WAT (UTC+01:00)
- Interactive map of Bayelsa International Airport

Runways
Direction	Length		Surface
Direction	m	ft	Surface
06/24	3,700	12,139	Asphalt

Bayelsa International Airport (also known as BIA) is an international airport located at Wilberforce Island, Bayelsa State, with GPS coordinates: 4°57′46″N 6°12′20″E.

The airport is operated by the Bayelsa Airport Company Limited.

== History ==
The airport was commissioned for construction in 2012 by Bayelsa State ex-Governor Henry Seriake Dickson. The airport had its inaugural flight on 14 February 2019.

The airport was officially commissioned for operation on Monday, 10 February 2020 by the former Governor of Bayelsa State Sen. Henry Seriake Dickson, a year after its inaugural flight.

Bayelsa International Airport was on the 17 April 2021 granted commercial flight operations approval by Nigerian Civil Aviation Authority (NCAA).

== Airlines and destinations ==
Airlines	Destinations	Refs
Ibom Air	Abuja	
United Nigeria Airlines	Abuja, Lagos	
