= Timipre Sylva =

Nigerian politician (born 1964)

Timipre Sylva CON

Minister of State for Petroleum Resources
- In office 21 August 2019 – 31 March 2023
- President: Muhammadu Buhari
- Minister: Muhammadu Buhari
- Preceded by: Emmanuel Ibe Kachikwu
- Succeeded by: Heineken Lokpobiri (Oil); Ekperikpe Ekpo (Gas)

7th & 9th Governor of Bayelsa State
- In office 27 May 2008 – 27 January 2012
- Preceded by: Werinipre Seibarugo
- Succeeded by: Nestor Binabo
- In office 29 May 2007 – 16 April 2008
- Preceded by: Goodluck Jonathan
- Succeeded by: Werinipre Seibarugo

Special Assistant to Minister of State for Petroleum Resources
- In office 2004–2007

Personal details
- Born: 7 July 1964 (age 62) Okpoama-Brass, Eastern Region (now in Bayelsa State), Nigeria
- Party: All Progressives Congress
- Spouse: Alanyingi Sylva
- Children: 3
- Education: University of Port Harcourt; UBIS University
- Occupation: Politician

Timipre Marlin Sylva CON (born 7 July 1964) is a Nigerian politician who served as the minister of state for Petroleum Resources of Nigeria from 2019 to 2023. He previously served as governor of Bayelsa State from 2007 to 2012.

== Early life and background ==
Sylva was born in Brass, Bayelsa (formerly Rivers State, of which Bayelsa State was split off from in 1996), He got part of his education in Bayelsa and in Lagos, the former capital of Nigeria. He was a member of the Rivers State House of Assembly in the 1990s.

== Education ==
Sylva graduated from the University of Port Harcourt with distinction in English (Linguistics) in 1986. At the time, he was the best graduating student from his department and departmental valedictorian. He was subsequently awarded a Doctor in International Relations (Honoris causa) by the UBIS University in 2011. Sylva was awarded his second Doctorate (Honoris Causa) in public administration on 2 December 2020 by AiPA (African Institute of Public Administration), Leading Edge Foundation and LBBS.

== Political career ==
Sylva's political career started in 1992 when he won a seat in the House of Assembly Election representing Brass constituency in old Rivers State. At the time, he was the youngest of all the members in the house of Assembly. His political career continued when he was appointed as the Special Assistant to the Minister of State for Petroleum in 2004 under the auspices of Edmund Daukoru. He continued in that position until he resigned to join the PDP gubernatorial primaries in 2006 in Bayelsa State, in which he placed second behind Goodluck Jonathan. After the PDP presidential primaries election Jonathan was appointed as a running mate to Umaru Musa Yar'Adua, the gubernatorial candidacy for PDP became vacant, and conventional wisdom took the better of the political actors and Sylva was elevated to occupy the position of PDP gubernatorial candidate.

As a candidate of the People's Democratic Party Sylva won the 2007 Bayelsa State gubernatorial election and succeeded Goodluck Jonathan who went on to the position of Vice President. During his inauguration he said that Bayelsa was "the least developed industrially and commercially" of all 36 states.

Sylva's opponent in the 2007 election, Ebitimi Amgbare of the Action Congress, legally challenged his victory. Although the Bayelsa State Election Petitions Tribunal upheld Sylva's election, Amgbare took the matter to the Appeal Court in Port Harcourt which overturned the Tribunal's decision and nullified Sylva's election on 15 April 2008. The Appeal Court's five justices were unanimous in their decision and ordered that Speaker Werinipre Seibarugo be sworn in to replace Sylva as acting Governor, with a new election to be held within three months.

A new election was held on 24 May 2008, and Sylva, again running as the PDP candidate, was overwhelmingly elected with 588,204 out of about 598,000 votes. He was sworn in again on 27 May, saying on this occasion that he would form a broadly inclusive unity government. On 27 January 2012, his tenure was terminated by the Supreme Court with an acting governor appointed to oversee the state until the election of February 2012. Sylva was appointed by President Buhari on Wednesday, 21 August 2019, as the Nigerian Cabinet Minister of State for Petroleum Resources.

== Corruption allegations ==
Senate President Ahmad Lawan has strongly denied allegations that members of the national assembly, including himself and House Speaker Femi Gbajabiamila, received $10 million in bribes to pass the Petroleum Industry Bill (PIB) in August 2021. The allegations suggested that financial incentives were distributed among legislators to support the bill, with Sylva and Akwa Ibom North-East Senator Bassey Albert Akpan allegedly coordinating the process. Lawan condemned the spread of fake news and misinformation, emphasising the importance of the PIB for Nigeria's economic development. He insisted the bill was passed on its merits after thorough debate and review. Lawan urged Nigerians to use their freedom of expression responsibly and to think positively about their leaders and administrations.

== Award ==
In October 2022, a Nigerian national honour of Commander of the Order of the Niger (CON) was conferred on him by President Muhammadu Buhari.

== See also ==
- List of governors of Bayelsa State
