= Niger Delta University =

Government funded university in Bayelsa State, Nigeria

- N.D.U.
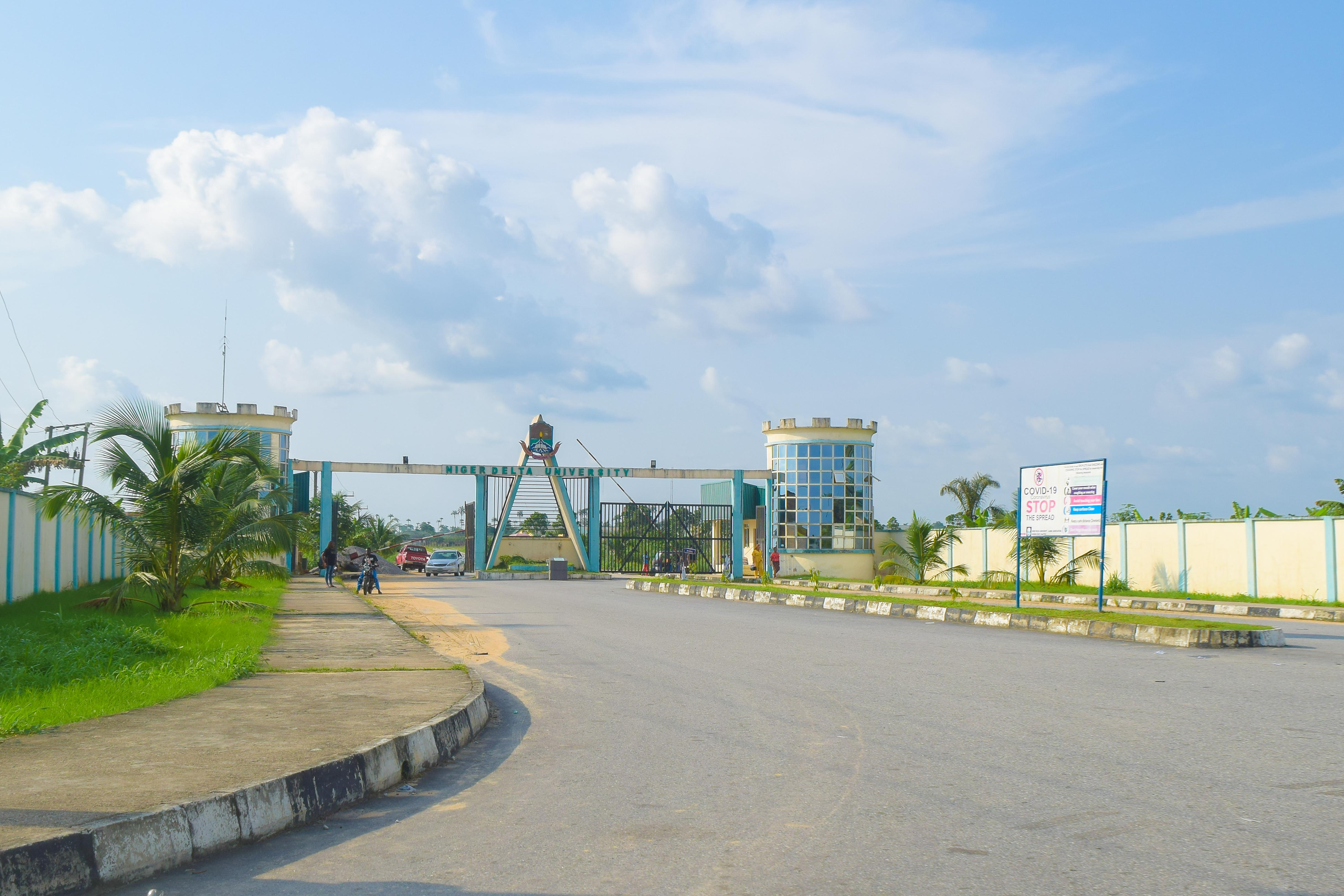
- Motto: Creativity, Excellence and Service
- Type: Urban (state government funded)
- Established: 2000
- Chancellor: Shehu of Borno, Dr Abubakar Ibn Umar Garbai El-kanemi
- Vice-Chancellor: Prof. Allen A. Agih
- Students: Above 20,000
- Location: Wilberforce Island, Amassoma, PMB 071, Bayelsa State, Nigeria; 4°58′29″N 6°06′17″E
- Campus: Amassoma and Yenagoa
- Website: www.ndu.edu.ng

Niger Delta University (NDU) is in Wilberforce Island, Bayelsa State in the southern part of Nigeria. It was established in 2000. It is a Bayelsa state government-funded university which was established by Chief D.S.P. Alamieyeseigha, then governor of Bayelsa state. It has two main campuses, one in the state capital, Yenagoa, which houses the law faculty, and the other in Amassoma. It also has its teaching hospital known as Niger Delta University Teaching Hospital (NDUTH) in Okolobiri.

The university offers education at Bachelor, Masters and PhD levels. It is a member of the Association of Commonwealth Universities. It is accredited and recognized by the National Universities Commission (NUC)

== Faculties ==
The University has thirteen (13) faculties. The faculties and their respective departments are:

=== Faculty of Agricultural Technology ===
- Department of Agricultural Economics and Rural Sociology
- Department of Crop Production
- Department of Fisheries
- Department of Livestock Production

=== Faculty of Arts ===
- Department of English and Literary Studies
- Department of History/Diplomacy
- Department of Philosophy
- Department of Religious Studies
- Department of Theatre Arts

=== Faculty of Environmental Sciences ===
- Department of Architecture
- Department of Fine and Applied Arts
- Department of Quantity Surveying
- Department of Environmental Management
- Department of Urban planning and Regional planning
- Department of Building

=== Faculty of Basic Medical Sciences ===
- Department of Biochemistry
- Department of Medical laboratory science
- Department of Anatomy
- Department of Physiology
- Department of Pathology
- Department of Pharmacology

=== Faculty of Clinical sciences ===
- Department of Community Medicine and Public Health
- Department of Family Medicine
- Department of Radiology
- Department of Dentistry
- Department of Surgery
- Department of Medicine
- Department of Obstetrics and Gynaecology
- Department of Paediatrics

=== Faculty of Engineering ===
- Department of Agricultural Engineering
- Department of Chemical/Petroleum/Petrochemical Engineering
- Department of Civil Engineering
- Department of Electrical/Electronic Engineering
- Department of Marine Engineering
- Department of Mechanical Engineering

=== Faculty of Education ===
- Department of Curriculum and Instruction with options in Biology, Chemistry, Economics, English Language, Fine and Applied Arts, French, Geography, Health Education, History, Mathematics, Physics, Physical Education, Political Science and Religious Studies.
- Educational Foundations with options in Adult Community Education, Education Administration, Guidance and Counseling and Primary Education
- Department of Vocational/Industrial Education with options in Agricultural Education, Business Education, Secretarial Education and Technical Education

=== Faculty of Law ===
Source:

=== Faculty of Management Sciences ===
- Department of Accountancy
- Department of Banking, Finance and Insurance
- Department of Business Administration
- Department of Marketing
- Department of Office Management Technology

=== Faculty of Pharmacy ===
- Department of Clinical Pharmacy and Pharmacy Practice
- Department of Pharmaceutical & Medicinal Chemistry
- Department of Pharmacognosy & Herbal Medicine
- Department of Pharmaceutics & Pharmaceutical Technology
- Department of Pharmaceutical Microbiology & Biotechnology
- Department of Pharmacology & Toxicology

=== Faculty of Sciences ===
- Department of Biological Science
- Department of Computer Science
- Department of Geology
- Department of Mathematics
- Department of Microbiology
- Department of Physics
- Department of Pure and Applied Chemistry

=== Faculty of Social Sciences ===
- Department of Economics
- Department of Geography and Environmental Management
- Department of Political Science
- Department of Sociology
- Department of Mass Communication

== Former Vice Chancellors ==
- Professor John Cecil Buseri {Pioneer VC}
- Professor Chris Ikporukpo
- Professor Humphrey Ogoni
- Professor Samuel Gowon Edoumiekumor
- Prof. Allen Aziba-Odumosi Agih {current}

== History ==
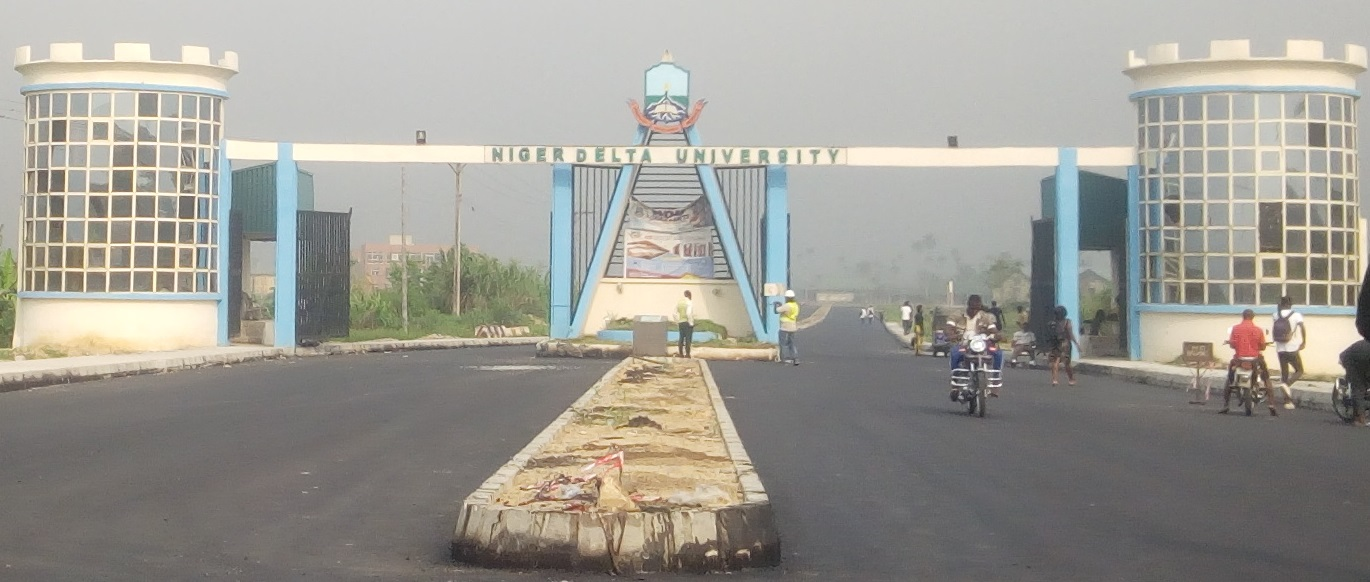
Entrance to campus

The establishment of the University through a law in 2000 was a significant turning-point in the educational and socio-economic history of Bayelsa State in particular and Nigeria in general.

The University, which started academic activities in the 2001/2002 session, had its pioneer set of graduating students in the 2004/2005 academic year. Although, the student population was only 1,039 at inception, this increased to 4,636 in 2003/2004 and later 10,294 in 2006/2007. The University maintains the quota provided by the National Universities Commission (NUC). There has been a significant increase in the number of academic and non-teaching staff.

== Campuses ==
The university is in Wilberforce Island, approximately 32 km from the state capital Yenagoa and is made up of three campuses: Gloryland (main campus), College of Health Sciences, and the temporary campus of the Faculty of Law in Yenagoa. A new campus, which is an extension of the Gloryland campus, is being developed with Standard Faculty buildings, School of Postgraduate Studies, DOCERAD, Senate Building(Under Construction), inter alia.

== Notable alumni ==
- Idyl (Musician - The Voice 2017 winner)
