= Executive Council of Bayelsa State =

Nigerian governmental body

The Bayelsa State Executive Council (also known as the Cabinet of Bayelsa State) is the highest governmental body that plays important roles in the Government of Bayelsa State headed by the Governor of Bayelsa State. It consists of the Deputy Governor, the Secretary to the State Government, Chief of Staff, Commissioners who preside over ministerial departments, and the Governor's special aides.

== Functions ==
The Executive Council exists to advise and direct the Governor. Their appointment as members of the Executive Council gives them the authority to execute power over their fields.

== Current cabinet ==
The current Executive Council of Commissioners and Principal Officers also known as The Bayelsa State Cabinet is serving under the Duoye Diri's administration.

=== Commissioners and Principal Officers ===
The Bayelsa State Executive Council, also referred to as the Cabinet of Bayelsa State, functions as the state's highest decision-making body, operating under the leadership of the Governor as Governor-in-Council. This key council includes the Deputy Governor, the Secretary to the State Government, the Chief of Staff, Head of Service, and Commissioners responsible for managing various ministries and departments. The current composition of the Bayelsa State Executive Council consists of:

Office	Incumbent
Governor	Douye Diri
Deputy Governor	Lawrence Ewhrudjakpo
Secretary to the State Government	Nimibofa Ayawei
Attorney General & Commissioner of Justice	Biriyai Dambo (SAN)
Chief of Staff	Dr. Peter P. Akpe
Head of Service	Biobele Charles-Onyema
Commissioner of Finance	Hon. Maxwell Ebibai
Commissioner of Works & Infrastructure	Surv. Moses Teibowei
Commissioner of Education	Hon. Dr. Emelah Gentle
Commissioner of Lands & Survey	Barr. Perepuighe Biewari
Commissioner of Women Affairs & Social Development	Mrs. Elizabeth Bidei
Commissioner for Special Duties (General Services)	Mazi Onuma Johnson
Commissioner for Water Resources	Engr. Komuko Akari Kharin
Commissioner for Special Duties (West)	Hon. Micheal Magbisa
Commissioner of Youths & Sports Development	Mr. Daniel B. Igali
Commissioner of Power	Engr. Kharin Komuko
Commissioner of Agriculture and Natural Resources	Prof. Beke Sese
Commissioner of Local Government and Chieftaincy Administration	Chief Thompson Amule
Commissioner of Trade, Industry & Investment	Dr. Ebieri Jones
Commissioner for Labour, Employment and Productivity	Chief Saturday Omiloli
Commissioner for Environment	Hon. Ebi Ben-Ololo
Commissioner for Health	Prof. Seiyefa Brisibe
Commissioner for Lands & Housing	Barr. Perepuighe Biewari
Commissioner for Culture and Tourism Development	Hon. Alla John
Commissioner Mineral Resources	Hon. Peter Afagha
Commissioner for Communication, Science and Technology	Hon. Gibson Munalayefa
Commissioner for Budget and Economic Planning	Hon. Rex Flint George
Commissioner for Transport	Hon. Preye Broderick
Commissioner for Ijaw National Affairs	Chief Godspower Oporomo

=== General Managers and Directors ===
Office	Incumbent
Director of the Aviation Services	Akpama Elizabeth Daitare
Managing Director of Bayelsa Airlines	Henry O. Ungbuku
Managing Director of the Bayelsa Dredging and Construction Company	Waritimi Amos
Managing Director of the Bayelsa Geographic Information System	Igo Assembly Goin
Managing Director and Chief Executive Officer of Bayelsa Hotels & Tourism	Enokie Kelvin Bribena
Director-General of the Bayelsa Investment Promotion Agency	Patience Ranami Abah
Director-General of the New Yenagoa City Development Agency	Emi Faloughi
Executive Chairman of the Bayelsa Library Board	Seiyifa Koroye
Managing Director of the Bayelsa Oil Company Limited	Dorgu Ebikabowei Charles
Managing Director of the Bayelsa Property and Investment Company Limited	Doubra Godwin Konyefa
General Managing Director of the Bayelsa State Agriculture Development Corporation	Helen Ajuwa
Director-General of the Bayelsa State Co-operative Bureau	Joseph Enie Alla
Director of the Bayelsa State Council for Arts and Culture	Payeboye Ebikomboere Festus-Lukoh
Director-General of the Bayelsa State Directorate of Schools Inspection and Policy Services	Stella Peremoboere Ugolo
Managing Director of the Bayelsa State Electricity Company Limited	Olice Kemenanabo
Rector of the Bayelsa State Institute of Entrepreneurship	Ayekeme Masa
Director-General of the Bayelsa State Medical Services Agency	Monica Azazi-Olarinde
Director-General of the Bayelsa State Microfinance and Enterprise Development Agency	Ebiekure Jasper Eradiri
General Manager of the Bayelsa State Newspaper Corporation	Alfred Egbegi
Director-General of the Bayelsa State Partnership Agency	Stanley Enaibagba Braboke
Chairman of the Bayelsa State Project Monitoring and Evaluation Board	Dio Wenapere Ambakederemo
Director-General of the Bayelsa State Public Service Training Institute	Christian Telimoye Ikelemote
Director-General of the Bayelsa State Tourism Development Agency	Patricia Garcia Henry
Managing Director and the CEO of the Bayelsa Trading Company Limited	Faith Opene Orubo
General-Manager of the Bayelsa Transport Company	Emomotimi Fanama
Director-General of the Centre for Women Development	Naomi Ogoli
Director-General of the Centre for Youth Development	Victor Okubonanabo
Director-General of the Directorate of Diaspora Affairs	Charles Preye Zuofa
General-Manager of the Directorate of Policy and Programmes	Idumange John Agreen
Director-General of the Due Process Bureau	Amaebi Ikpitibo
Head Marshall of the Education Safety Corps	Curbeth Aleibiri Mezeh
Director-General of the Girl Child Protection Bureau	Juliet Puluzibe Zifawei
Director-General of the Housing and Property Development Authority	Enokie Kelvin Bribena
Provost of the Isaac Jasper Adaka Boro College of Education	Timothy Epidi
Managing Director of the Izon Micro Finance Bank	Nengi Rufus-Spiff
Director-General of the NGO’s and Civil Societies Agency	Joseph Glory Kemeagbeye
Director of New Media	Ebizimor Koroye
General-Manager of the Niger Delta Television	Tamarakuro Oweifei
Executive Secretary of the Physical Planning and Development Board	Iboro Yilaziba Ige-Idaba
General-Manager of the Radio Bayelsa (Glory FM 97.1)	Febabor Tari
Director of Small Business Development at the Flour Mills, Port Harcourt	Prince Efere
Director-General of the Special Services Bureau 1 for the Secretary to the State Government's Office	Iboro Yilaziba Ige-Idaba
Acting Director-General of the State Action Committee on AIDS (SACA)	Lawrence Omoru
Director of the Students’ Welfare	Florence Ogbotiti Amaso
Director of VIP Protocol	David K. Nanakumo

=== Heads of Boards and Committees ===
Office	Incumbent
Chairman of the Assembly Service Commission	Perediyegha Ajoko
Chairman of the Bayelsa Committee on the Management and Control of Ranches	Shittu Mohammed
Chairman of the Bayelsa Directorate of Project Monitoring and Evaluation Board	Wenepere Ambakederemo Dio
Chairman of the Bayelsa Education Development Trust Funds Board	T. T. Isoun
Chairman of the Bayelsa Emergency Management Agency Board	Zedekiah Isu
Chairman of the Bayelsa Geographical Information Systems	Alex Ekiotenne
Chairman of the Bayelsa Independent Electoral Commission	Bertola Perekeme
Chairman of the Bayelsa Land Use and Allocation Committee	Joseph Akedesuo
Chairman of the Bayelsa Micro-Finance Bank Limited	Francis Doukpola
Chairman of the Bayelsa Physical Planning and Development Tribunal	Hon. Justice Y. E. Ogola
Chairman of the Bayelsa State Health Service Scheme	Onyaye Euphemia Kunle-Olowu
Chairwoman of the Bayelsa State Parks and Gardens	Roseline Endeley Princewill
Chairwoman of the Bayelsa State Pensions Board	Jane Alek
Chairman of the Bayelsa State Pilgrims Welfare Board	Ege Israel Eniyekenimi
Secretary of the Bayelsa State Procurement Board	Ebikake Godwin Ebikipah
Chairwoman of the Bayelsa State Science and Technology Education Board	Ayebaemi Spiff
Chairman of the Bayelsa Water Ways Security Committee	Africanus Ukparasia
Chairman of the Board of BDIC	Serena Dokubo-Spiff
Chairman of the Board of the State Ecumenical Centre	Doutimi Patience Amatare
Chairman of the Governing Council of the Bayelsa College of Health Technology	T.K.O Okorotie
Chairman of the Local Government Pensions Board	Frazer Okuoru
Chairman of the Physical Planning and Urban Development Board	Waribiegha Ebi Wanimi Wokojiezi
Chairman of the Physically Challenged Person's Welfare Committee	Bishop Akponanabofa
Chairman of SUBEB	Victor Okubonanabo
Chairman of the Special Committee on the Niger Delta University	Stephen Odiowei
Chairman of Swali Ultra - Modern Market Management Committee	Kemelayefa Festus Akpowei
