= Douye Diri =

Nigerian politician (born 1959)

His Excellency Douye Diri
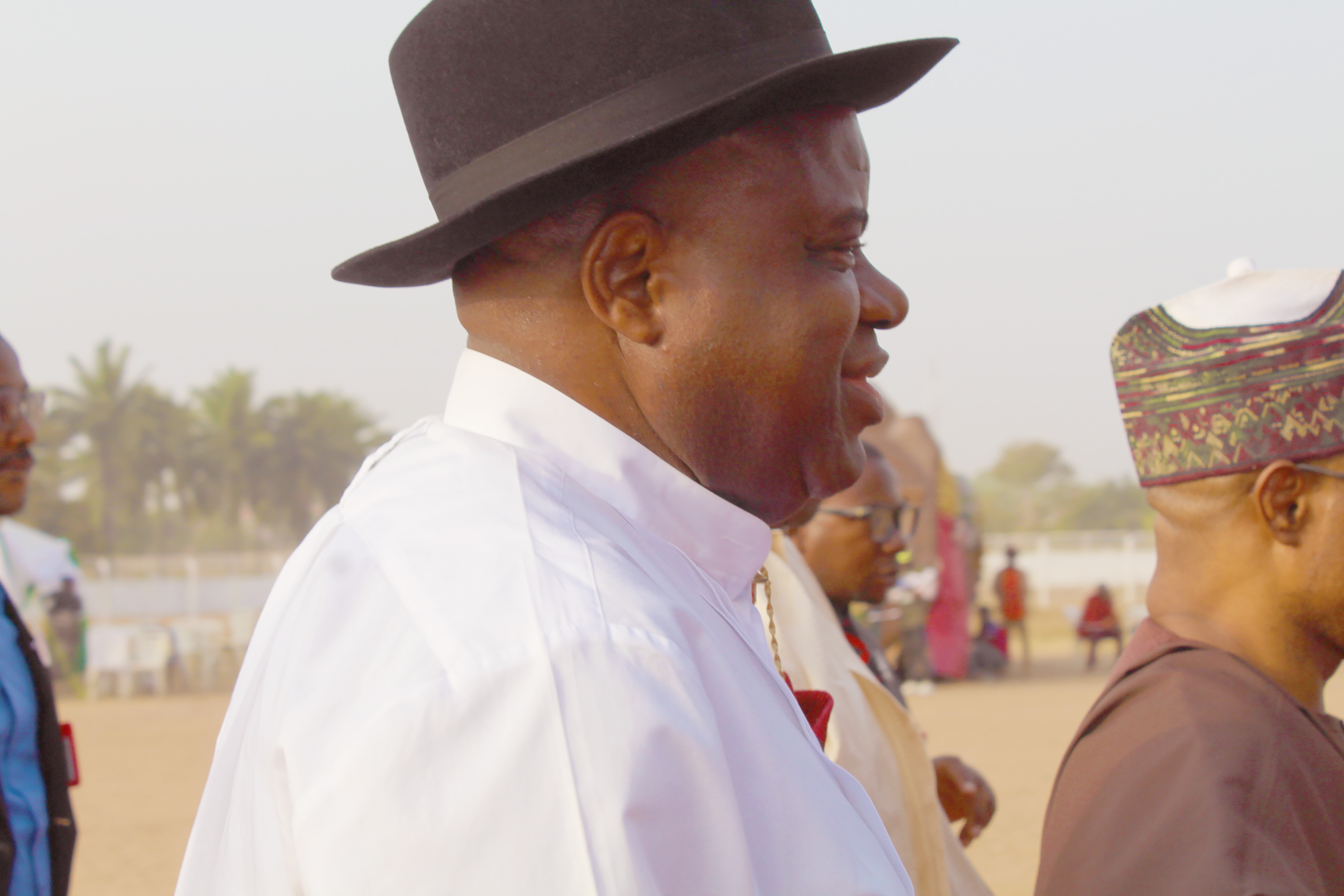
- Diri in December 2024

12th Governor of Bayelsa State
- Incumbent
- Assumed office 14 February 2020
- Deputy: Lawrence Ewhrudjakpo (2020–2025); Peter Akpe (since 2026)
- Preceded by: Seriake Dickson

Senator for Bayelsa Central
- In office 11 June 2019 – 11 February 2020
- Preceded by: Emmanuel Paulker
- Succeeded by: Moses Cleopas

Personal details
- Born: 4 June 1959 (age 67)
- Party: All Progressives Congress
- Spouse: Gloria Diri
- Education: College of Education, Port Harcourt; University of Port Harcourt (B. Ed)
- Occupation: Politician

Douye Diri (born 4 June 1959) is a Nigerian politician who has served as the governor of Bayelsa State since 2020. He was the senator representing Bayelsa Central Senatorial District from 2019 to 2020 in the 9th National Assembly.

== Early life ==
Douye Diri was born on 4th June 1959 in Sampou, Kolokuna/Opokuma Local Government Area of Bayelsa State, Nigeria. He began his early education at Okoro Primary School, Sampou, and concluded it at Rev. Proctor Memorial Primary School, Kaiama, in 1977, where he obtained his First School Leaving Certificate. He later attended Government Secondary School, Odi, in Bayelsa. Douye studied at the College of Education, Port-Harcourt, Rivers State, where he obtained a National Certificate in Education (NCE) in 1985. He also attended the University of Port-Harcourt, obtaining a Bachelor of Education (B.Ed.) degree in political science in 1990.

== Governor of Bayelsa ==
On 13 February 2020, the Supreme Court of Nigeria invalidated the results of the 2019 Bayelsa State gubernatorial elections on grounds that the running mate of the actual winner of the election, David Lyon, submitted a confidential certificate to the Independent National Electoral Commission. The court ordered Diri to be issued a certificate of return, which would make him governor-elect.

On 14 February 2020, he was sworn in as the governor of Bayelsa State.

=== August 2020 court rulings ===
On 17 August 2020, a tribunal at Abuja, Nigeria, ordered Diri sacked as the state governor. However, on 2 October 2020, a court of appeal sitting in Abuja overruled the tribunal court and confirmed him as governor.

== Airport security controversy ==
In August 2021, it was reported that Diri and his aides had forced their way through security checkpoints at Murtala Muhammed International Airport while trying to board the inaugural United Nigeria Airlines Lagos-to-Yenagoa flight.

== See also ==
- List of governors of Bayelsa State
- Executive Council of Bayelsa State
