= List of villages in Bayelsa State =

This is a list of villages and settlements in Bayelsa State, Nigeria, organised by local government area (LGA) and district or area. Postal codes also given.

== By postal code ==
Below is a list of districts, that includes towns and villages, arranged properly by postal code

LGA	District / Area	Postal code	Villages
Brass	Brass	562101	Abadikiri; Abedigbene; Abolikiri; Abulobiri; Adaakou; Adamkiri; Agbakabiriyai; Agubagaha; Akassa; Akipelai; Amagbefeu; Ampogu; Aparanbio; Arumhikiri; Atubo; Awajeakiri; Awazakiri; Ayagirikiri; Bamankiri; Beletiama; Benkiri; Biantubu; Boama; Bonneykiri; Brass; Buogboko; Burukiri; Cape Formosa; Captninakiri; Clarendon; Curpen; Duokumgbene; Ebelegbene; Ebikiri; Edebarikiri; Egbedekiri; Egbilaba; Egekiri; Egeletia; Egeregere; Egereogo; Egwema; Egwema Pogu; Ekemakiri; Ekesitoko; Elgitekin; Eluenigbene; Enegalogo; Ereweibio; Etabolagone; Ewediri; Eweisuo; Ewoama; Ewokiri; Eyenkiri; Fantuo; Fiwaritimi; Ganigbene; Gbene Ghama; Gold Coast; Golubokiri; Guorogbene; Ibelebiekiri; Ibtufra-Makiri; Idema; Igbabele; Igbabopiri; Ijawki; Imbiri; Iniedoyey-Ekiri; Isikara; Iwoama; Jekegbene; Kabuke; Kalabilema; Kallah Oroba Island; Kamikiri; Kemmers Town; Kinkiamabugo; Kirigupo; Kirikakiri; Kongho; Kpangbokiri; Kurogbaba; Liama; Location; Mabokubu; Mansiorkiri; Mbaskiri; Mileokiri; Minibeleu; Misakiri; Moborokiri; Monikiri; Munighakiri; Namatebe; Nampoju; Oaroweiama; Obama; Obi; Obudogbene; Odioma; Ofo Market; Ogalkiri; Ogbonotroko; Oimiekiri; Okiinibiriba; Okinbiriboteu; Okobotruo; Okoribukio; Okparanaba; Okpoama; Okpokiri; Olugama; Olukama; Olukugbene; Omonikiri; Omugopogu; Onunu; Onunwypele; Opolochi; Oporoma; Opu Akassa; Opuorubo; Orawo; Oro-Foniweitoro; Orukiri; Orukutu; Osugbene; Otatubei; Otolo; Otufor; Peribe; Philippo; Sabatoru; Saikiri; sanekubo; Sangana; Sasuokiri; Sounkiri; Sowegbene; Spiffis Town; Tana; Tengikiri; Tereke; Ton Kiri; Tuluama; Wabokiri; Wagite; Waribokikiri; Warise Gbene; Warri
Ekeremor	Ekeremor	561102	Aiegbe; Aleibiri; Amabulour; Ananagbene; Angalawei-gbene; Ayamassa; Bown-Adagbabiri; Azagbene; Eduwini; Ekeremor; Feremoama; Fontoru-Gbene; Isampou; Isreal o-Zion; Lalagbene; Norhene; Obrigbene; Ogbogbene; Ogbosuwar; Oporoma; Opukushi; Oyiakiri; Peretou-Gbene; Tamogbene; Tamu-Gbene; Tarakiri; Tietiegbene; Toru-Foutorugbene; Toru-Ndoro
Kolokuma/Opokuma	Kolokumma	560102	Akaibiri; Aya-Ama; Ayibabiri; Ayokoroma; Gbarama; Igbanwa; Igbedi; Kaiama; Ịdị; Ofonibiri; Okolobaa; Oloibiri; Oyobu; Sabagreia; Sampou
Nembe	Nembe	562102	Adukiri; Agada; Agrisaba; Akakumana; Allagaokiri; Amasara; Benkiri; Dorgu-Ewoama; Dumobi-Kumakiri; Ekpeikiri; Elemuama; Enyumuana; Etieme; Ewokiri; Fekorukiri; Igbeta-Ewoama; Ikensi; Isaiahkiri; Iseleogona; Iserekiri; Mini; Nembe; Obiama; Obiata; Odekiri; Okokokiri; Okoroba; Ologoma; Olusasiri; Oromabiri; Otumakiri; Sabatoru; Sangakubu; Shellkiri; Tengelkiri; Tengikokiri; Tombi
Ogbia	Ogbia	562103	Abobir; Akolomani; Amorokeni; Amuruto; Anyama; Egeleama; Elebele; Emadike; Emago; Emakalakala; Emegai; Epebu; Ewama; Ewoi; Igbo; Imiringi; Iyakiri; Kolo; Obakilolo; Obelebiri; Obuaba; Ogbia; Ogboama; Ogireyankiri; Okiki; Okodi; Olobiri; Ologi; Ologoghe; Oluaganagu; Onuebum; Opume; Oruma; Otegila; Otegwe; Otuabagi; Otuabai 1; Otuabula 1; Otuabula 11; Otuaganagu; Otuakeme; Otuedu; Otueke; Otuegwe; Otuekpein; Otuogidi; Otuogori; Otuokpoti; Qutar; Sagatama; Sobo Camp; Warbugoama
Sagbama	Sagbama	561101	Abuku; Adagbabiri; Agbere; Agoro; Agorogbene; Akeddei; Angalabiri; Anibeze; Asamabiri; Bolou-Orua; Dagnnama; Ebedebiri; Egbepulougbene; Ekperiware; Elemebiri; Igoni; Ikpidiama; Kanan; Odoni; Ofoni; Ogobiri; Ogobokiriama; Ogoni; Okumbiri; Osibiri; Osssiama; Sagbama; Toru-Angiama; Toru-Ebeni; Toru-Orua; Trofani; Tungbabiri; Tungbo
Southern Ijaw	Kolu-Ama	560104	Akaragbene; Akpobeleiowei; Alagbene; Alisogbene; Amataugbene; Apoi; Arikaripo; Aziama; Babatonogbene; Bayentorugbene; Bikirubogbene; Birieigbene; Birisyegbene; Bitou; Bokomgbene; Buragbene; Burukububo; Consingbere; Diogbegbene; Donkerogbene; Douglasgbene; Dubagbene; Ebatimogbene; Ebidargbene; Eduregbene; Egberime 1; Egberime 11; Ekeogbene; Ekinigbene; Erebugbene; Etemere; Fiesigbene; Foniweitoro; Fungbene; Gbaran; Glologbene; Guaregbene; Hewigbene; Hittargbene; Hopin Point; Ibikologbene; Idebugbene; Izonagbene; Kalarogbene; Kalawarigbene; Kamboira Boria; Kasoma; Kogbene; Kokologbene; Koluama; Komobiama; Komoforagbene; Kugbogbene; Lasofa; Lobia; Lofamagbene; Loinbirikibi; Magbogbene; Ngakoro; Ngukuiagbene; North Point; Nyuseyegbene; Obomikorogbene; Odeigbene; Ofmiegbene; Ofogbene; Ogbogbene; Ogbogero; Ogboidigbene; Ogodikoro; Ogolangorugbene; Okoboudob; Okpofuwari; Olobia; Olodi; Oloogbene; Oporogbene; Osugbene; Paratubo; Pepegbene; Pepelegbene; Peresisofogbene; Petugbene; Piebolegbene; Pisegbene; Port-Harcourt-gbene; Rituagbene Saugagbene; Segpe; Sonamadingbene; Sonotubogbene; Tacadosgene; Talegbene; Tangagae; Tebitubufor; Teibidaba; Tipama; Tofiagbene; Tologbene; Tuimpeigbene; Ukptatube; Ukubie; Watchmangbene; Yedogbene
Southern Ijaw	Oporoma	560103	Abagbene; Abolgbene; Agidigbere; Aguobiri; Aleegbene; Amassoma; Angiama; Angiama-gbene; Ayama; Ayougbene; Azuzuama; Baberegbene; Betterland; Biabugbene; Biagbogbene; Bolongbene; Boma; Climonbene; Diebu; Egarebeni; Ekeni; Ekowe; Emete; Eniwari; Erefumakomogbene; Ezetu; Foinbiri; Furopa; Gboloketise; Igbomatoru; Ikebiri; Ikeingbabiri; Ikiambiri; Ikoromogbene; Ikpirigbene; Isaihgbene; Jermaih-gbene; Kemeligbene; Keregbene; Korokorsei; Korumogbene; Laisukugbene; Lalgbene; Livergbene; Luckygbene; Luduon; Nengigbene; Nicholas-Gbene; Ogilagbene; Ogoubiri; Ohugbabiri; Okigbene; Okpolububo; Olobobene; Olugbogbene; Olugbobiri; Ondewari; Onyoma; Oporoma; Opuama; Orikowe; Osiama; Otuan; Oweikorogba; Oyeregbene; Ozezebiri; Peremabiri; Polobugo; Saberugbene; Sibiri; Sundaugbene; Sungbene; Tomgbene; Waribugo-gbene
Yenagoa	Yenagoa (Rural)	569101	Abasere; Agbia; Agbobiri; Agorogbene; Agudama; Agudama-Epie; Akada; Akpide; Akunomi; Amarata; Amasso; Anyamabele; Atissa; Azikoro; Bebelibiri; Betaland; Biogbolo; Biseni; Bumodi; Ede-Pie; Egbebiri; Ekeki; Ekpetiama; Emblama; Epie; Fangbe; Freetown; Gbarain; Gbaramtoru; Ibia; Igbogene; Ikarama; Ikibiri; Ikolo; Jackbiri; Kaiama; Kalaba; Karama; Korama; Kpansia; Nyanbiri; Obungha; Ogboloma; Ogoniforu; Ogu; Ojogbolo; Okolobiri; Okorodia; Okotiama; Okutukutu; Omom; Onura; Opolo; Ovelemini; Polaku; Tein; Tombia; Tuburu; Yenegwe; Yeniozue-Epie; Zarama; Zarama Epie

== By electoral ward ==
Below is a list of polling units, including villages and schools, organised by electoral ward.

LGA	Ward	Polling Unit Name
Brass	Brass 1	Town Community School Building; Gbundu Open Space; Ada Open Space; Agip Site (Industrial) Open Space; Shidi Compound Open Space; Market Square Open Space; Igbodo 1 Open Space; Agip Site Open Space; Alafie Open Space; Boutibi Open Space; Andrew Polo Open Space; Inabuna Open Space; Ingo Polo Open Space; Cameroun Open Space; Sambo I Open Space; George Polo Open Space; Apostolic Community Hall; Erefamokuma Open Space; Egla Compound Open Space; Jane Compound Open Space; Sampson Compound Open Space; Eninah Open Space
Brass	Brass Ward II	Twon Community Kemmer Open Space; Consulate (Open Space); Fire Station Open Space; General Hospital Open Space; Dogiye Polo Open Space; Sunny Polo Open Space; Twon Kubu Community Hall; Location Kiri Community Hall; G. S. S Twon School Building; Kalaorobou Open Space; Sinteh Polo Open Space; Customary Court Court Hall; Mansonkiri Open Space; Asnogbakiri Open Space; Onabago; Micah - Kiri Open Space
Brass	Ewoama/Fantuo	Sieri Polo Community Hall; Sieri Polo Open Space; John Polo Open Space; Iti-Kiri Open Space; Powgu Polo Open Space; Dirikiri School Building; Opourubou Community Hall; Kurogbagba Open Space; Opu-Polotri Open Space; Joshua Polo-Fantuo - Open Space; Gold Coast Community Hall; Eg-Ein Kiri Open Space; Walter Kiri Open Space
Brass	Okpoama	Aguma Polo Open Space; S. S. Okpoama School Buikding; Orukumo Polo Open Space; Dukuraku Central Open Space; Isele - Ama Open Space; G. S..S Okpoama Open Space; Town Hall - Town Hall; Opu - Polo North Open Space; Gbana Polo Open Space; Seaside Kiri Open Space; Ogbo - Polo Central Open Space; Dukuma Tubu Open Space; Opu-Polo Open Space; Jonisoniyaikiri Open Space; Tokin Hall Open Space
Brass	Odioma/Diema	Ogbo-Polo Community Hall; Otokolo Kiri Open Space; Ikei Diema Open Space; Diema Seaside Open Space; Elemuama Diema Open Space; Beleu Polo Diema Open Space; Ogono Polo Open Space; Adumu - Ama - Community Hall; S. S. Ibidi School Building; Akabeleu Community Hall; C. S. S. Odioma Open Space; S. S.. Odioma Open Space; Owubio Open Space; Oyankia Open Space
Brass	Cape Farmosa	State School, Egweama; Open Space, Egweama; Town Hall, Egweama; Wagitia, Open Space; Mkt. Square, Egweama; Egeregere, Open Space; Egweama -Ogbo, Open Space; Gbene, Open Space; Potakotikiri, Open Space; Joweikiri, Open Space; State School, Liama; Liama - Ogbo, Open Space; Sikokodu, Open Space; Diopolo Open Space; Bududie, Open Space; Ogbopolo, Open Space; Igbagele Secondary Sch, Igbagele; Opu Polo Tikiri, Open Space; Brutus Compound, Igbagele; Holy Land, Igbagele; Ikpirikiripolo, Igbagele
Brass	Kongho	Ereweibie Community Hall; Hrm Palace Kongino Open Space; B C M Open Space; Ogbokiri Open Space; Kotikiri Open Space; Abazigbene Open Space; Yabie Open Space; Ikwakiri School Building; G. S. S. Akass Community Hall; Ombukorogha Polo Open Space; Buoama Open Space; Ingonabo Compound Open Space; Ihonogbene Open Space; Ibitimi Polo Open Space; Poku Polo Open Space
Brass	Oginibiri	Opu - Oginibiri Community Hall; S. S. Oginibiri School Building; Tobugbene Community Hall; Obonga-Agba Open Space; Obudegbene Open Space; Nanakiri - Kolobie Open Space; Opu - Gbene Open Space; Liberia - Kolobie Open Space; Bounbie Open Space; Amaingbene Open Space; Kulegha Polo Open Space; Ogoni Camp Open Space
Brass	Minibie	Segikiri Open Space; Abad Polo Open Space; Minibileie Open Space; Miniangba Open Space; Silver Polo Open Space; Tobugbene Open Space; Otongbene Open Space; Pominakiri Open Space; Itohono - Ama Open Space; U. A. C. Open Space; Amanyanabo Polo Open Space; Bekekiri Open Space; Okumbiri Open Space; S. S. Okumbiri School Building; S. S. Minibie School Building; Tonteremie Compound Open Space; Tempruah Polo Open Space; Sampson Polo
Brass	Sangana	Tomshai Sangana Open Space; Tomshai Sansana; C. S. S. Sabsaba - School Building; Community Sec. Sch., Sangana Sch. Building; State Sch. Sangana Open Space; Owi Polo Open Space; Moko Polo Open Space; Kiani - Biri Open Space; S. S. Otuo Open Space; Kalama Town Hall; Ago Gbene Open Space; S. S. Otioniweitoru Open Space; Katagbene Open Space
Ekeremor	Tarakiri	Benitengha Qtrs.; Ayamabiri Compound; Ogbeinbiri Qtrs; Obrienware Qtrs.; Akpass Ware Qtrs.; Edisibou Compound; Akebiri Compound; Harama Centre Zion; Health Centre Qtrs.; Larama Zion Town Square; Tamobiri Qtrs; Gbainwari Town Hall; Fuobiri Compound; Egboinwari/Ayamabiri Compound; Baneare Compound; Egbewari Qtrs.; Sukulukiri Compound; Titiberi Compound; Boudubuku Qtrs; Ogboyour Qtrs; Zideware Zide Qtrs
Ekeremor	Oyiakiri I	Kalatuware Compound; Ololuware Square; Feideiware Square; Atentuaware Square; Yeidirodeware Pri. Sch; Ogbosuware Pri. Sch.; Mainware Square; Ridonkumoware Square; Boumoware; Gagaraware Square; Priete/Diunbo Primary School; Ayanabiri Square
Ekeremor	Oyiakiri II	Medeware Square; Kereware Square; Ededeware Square; Deis Ware Square; Abogbaiware Square; Ambalabaware Compound; Ekparibagha; Amakubuware Square; Tekeware Square; Foubiri I Compound; Foubiri II / Akkpeitu
Ekeremor	Oyiakiri III	Kanren/Omgbontu; Ebideseighabofa Primary School; Ogboloserigbene Primary School; Agbogidi Dudu Square; Tietiegbene Qtrs; Agada Square; Konfagbene/Neniezion Qtrs; Ayokorogbene/Tikigbene Square; Akeyagbene/Kurubougbene
Ekeremor	Oyiakiri IV	Lalagbene Primary School; Ebiama Qtrs; Ofoniwaregbene Square; Akatomu/Adagbabiri Primary School; Kunole Primary School; Ogbosuware Primary School; C. P. S Ogbosuware Qtrs; Aduku Ams Qtrs; Amatebe Primary School.
Ekeremor	Oporomor I	Bolougbene Square; Tugbenue Qtrs; Dadiware Qtrs; Ogege Ware Qtrs; Bomobiri Qtrs; St. Julu Zion Qtrs; Tarakenegbene Qtrs; Ebikemegbene Qtrs; Otongbobiri; Afantan Qtrs; Amaika Zion Qtrs; Eniehaware Qtrs I; Endukeware Qtrs II; Awipiware Atrs; Bozimoware Qtrs; Akpobougbene Qtrs; Zion Qtrs
Ekeremor	Oporomor II	Bolou Egede Primary School; Sagba Egede Sec. School; Ofuru Egede Square; Clark-Gbere Square; Abuko Egede Square; Nurgbena/Apodobia; Eniededumu/Taraiza Pri. Sch.; Azagbene Square; Dibe/Apede-Egba Egede Square; Omion-Ware Sq; Orogbene Sec School; Azagboware Square; Taraiza Qtrs; Beautiful Gate Square; Peretu Egede Square; Feremams Town Hall
Ekeremor	Oporomor III	Egbalebokogbene/Atimigbene/Egbi Rigbenue/Egbede-Qtrs; Kumorgbene/Octoba-Ama Compound; Okorotie-Gbene Qtrs; Zincgbene/Etinbiri Qtrs; Duwoibal/Ogbobobou/Desin Perepor/Otiewei/Egbiriopomu- Compound; Akagbegbene/Zioton Ghagbene/Bemapude-Qtrs; Gbene/Akpama/Church/ Kirikaneye Compound; Weky Pacace Qtrs; California/Marcus Qtrs; Tomubulou/Egougboun. Compound; Okpegbene/Asenegbene - Opomugbene Compound; Olafagbene/Sapelegbene Qtrs; Olougbene/Omukorogbene/Compound; Seigha; Brango Qtrs; Agbanaware Qtrs I; Agomoware Qtrs II; Azikpoware Qtrs; Duwoisuoghaware Qtrs; Pena-Oweiware; Ogbosainware Qtrs; Emgbidiware; Adenekeware; Ayeware Qtrs; Ayama I; Ayama II; Ayama III; Azuzuware I Square I; Azuzuware II Square II; Azidekeoreyeine Square; Ayama IV; Ayama V; Ayama VI; Eselemoeregbene/Ondudumogbene/Okortiegbene; Agomoware 11
Ekeremor	Oporomor IV	Abiri I Square; Abiri II Qtrs I; Abiri III Qtrs II; Birierewou I Compound I; Birierewou II Compound II; Azazibiri Square; Bou Square; Daunemughan Compound; Ekambara Square; Ekiere Square; Fiefie; Odoh I; Odoh II; Ebikakebiri Square; Sanah I; Sanah II Qtrs.; Tounbolapere Qtrs; Gedebiri Qtrs; Akologbene Qtrs; Akono Qtrs
Ekeremor	Oporomor V	Biowei Pri. School; Andeigbene Square; Ayana Egede Square; Fou Egede Square; Pere Egede Square; Si - Egede Square; Tarepere -Egede/ Square; Tamo-Ndoro/Afarou Qtrs; Suogbene Qtrs; Glory Zion Qtrs; Abuko Bulou Qtrs; Gwaze Square; Owegbene Pri. Sch.; Church Edumu Square; Okokodia Edumu; Oyakpadekumor Qtrs
Ekeremor	Eduwini I	Zafawei/Igbons/Akori/Aginabiri Square; Ayams/Bakiri Zion Square; Agberigbari/Guode. Square; Market/Yapregba Zion Square; Azatitor/Famous Zion Qtrs; Amazer; Osumaibic/Warebakefe; Agge Palm Bush Qtrs; Iduere/Egbe Ebe Qtrs; Amatuf/Azamabiri Square; Ogberintu Square; Orobiri Square
Ekeremor	Eduwini II	Tobobiri/Poubiri; Biobiri Square; Tonor Square; Ebiribodo Square; Bessingbene Square; Fiye Edumu Hall; Agudugu T. Hall; Pentuware T. Hall; Azagbeane; Aya Idumu Square; Tunu Qtrs; Idoro -Idumu Qtrs; Tobubiri Pri. School; Tobugbene - Toru Qtrs; Opukushi Square; Foubopolo Square; Clough Creck Square; Bebetorudigausee Square; Koromotoru Square; Censetebe Square
Kolokuma/Opokuma	Odi (North) I	Yainmoama Town Hall; Yainmoama Market Square I; Yainmoama Market Square II; Yainmoama Ogbo Town Hall; Ebereze (Ekperi) Open Space; Kemenanabo Town Hall; Olodani Town Hall; Amakiriebiama Village Square; Amakiebiama Town Hall; Amakiribiama Open Square
Kolokuma/Opokuma	Odi (Central) II	Ogiema Town Hall; Ogienma Town Hall; Fishing Camp Town Hall; Fishing Camp; Ifidiedewari Town Hall; Edeware Town Hall; Edeware Square; Edeware - Ogbo Market Square; Kolony Town Hall I; Kolony Town Hall II; Edebeinmo Town Hall; Edebeinmo Square; Edebeinmo Sch. Building; Ebiware Town Hall; Teikiri Town Square
Kolokuma/Opokuma	Odi (South) III	Ogboloma Town Hall; Ogboloma Town Hall (II); Ogboloma Town Square; Oboribeingha Town Square; Oboribeingha Town Square (II); Oboribeingha Town Square (III); Ubaka Town Hall; Ubaka Square Town Square; Ubaka Square Market (I); Ubaka Square Market (II); Isounbiri Sch. Compound; Isounbiri Town Square (I); Isounbiri Town Square (II); Isounbiri Play Ground
Kolokuma/Opokuma	Kaiama	Ikatibiri Town Hall; Ikatiware Town Hall; Ikatibiri Town Square I; Ikatibiri Town Square II; Idowari Town Hall I; Idowari Town Hall II; Odowari Town Square; Odowari Market Square; Odowari Plg Ground; Foruware Town Hall I; Foruware Town Hall II; Ekpeinama Town Hall; Ekpeinbiri Town Hall
Kolokuma/Opokuma	Kaiama/Olobiri	Kilegbegha Town Hall; Kigbeghawari Town Hall; Kigbegha Open Space; Talawari Town Hall I; Wari Out Town Hall; Ereweri Customary Court; Erewari Open Space; Wanka Town Hall; Olobiri Play Ground; Olobiri Town Hall; Imgbelawari Town Hall; Agbarawari Town Hall; Nigeriawari Town Square; Etierebau Town Square; Olobirigbene Town Hall; College Kiri Sch. Hall
Kolokuma/Opokuma	Sampou/Kalama	Sampou North Town Hall I; Sampou North Town Hall II; Ibaba Wari Pri. School; Kalaowe Owei; Kalama North Town Square; Kalama Town Hall; Southern Kalama Town Hall; Kalama Town Square
Kolokuma/Opokuma	Opokuma North	Ofonibiri Town Hall; Ofonibiri Square; Orubirib Ogbo Town Hall; Orubiri Town Square; Ayakoroama Town Square; Gbaranama Town Square I; Gbaranama Town Square II; Abuwari Town Hall; Expuwari Village Square I; Expuwari Village Square II; Expuwari Town Hall; Igbainwari Town Hall I; Igbainwari Town Hall II; Igbainwari Town Square
Kolokuma/Opokuma	Opokumasouth	Eweliwari Town Square; Evikagbene Town Hall; Baraware Town Hall; Siki Gbene Town Hall; Gbaranbiri Waiting Shed Town Hall; Play Ground Town Hall; Oruogbo Town Hall; Aya Ogbo Pri. School; Odonbade Town Hall; Rest House Town Hall; Oyobu Waiting Shed I; Oyobo Waiting Shed II; Odukurugha Town Hall; Teikiri Playground
Kolokuma/Opokuma	Seibokorogha (Sabagreia) 1	Foubiri Market Square I; Foutiri Market Square II; Foubiri Town Hall; Aseibiri Town Hall; Aseibiri Awou Town; Egbedani Town Hall; Kemebiama Town Hall; Town Square Town Hall Egbedani; Amatu Town Hall Egbedani; Datu Gbebe-Kalama Town Hall; Kalama Town Hall I; Kalama Town Hall II; Kalama Town Square I; Kalama Town Square II; Opu - Kalama Town Square; Amaseitiri Town Hall; Kalama Owugbene; Abobiri Town Hall; Zipre - Bo - Kalama
Kolokuma/Opokuma	Okoloba (Sabagreia) II	Olodani Town Hall I; Olodani Town Hall II; Isedani Open Space; Tamu/Isedani Open Space; Abadani Pri. School; Opu-Abadani Town Hall; Abadani Town Square; Burudani Town Hall; Igbanibo Gbene; Igbanibo Square
Kolokuma/Opokuma	Igbedi	Gbagbawari Town Hall I; Gbagbawari Town Hall II; Balibou Town Square; Ubaka Town Square; Ogboin Gbene Pri. School; Fouebiri Pri School; Orubiri Town Hall; Okpotulubo Town Hall; Adiebiri Town Hall; Boutoru Town Hall
Nembe	Ogbolomabiri 1	Isoukiri 1/Isoukiri Village Square; Ockiya Ewoama/Iwoama Square; Isoukiri 11/Yekorogha Comp; Ogiriki Polo/Community Square; Madiara Polo/Madiara Square; Ch. Amain Comp/Uac; Ch. Amain Comp/St. Lukes Nembe; Tubopiri/Tubopiri Square; Akparanta/Community Square; Isikara/Egwe Ewoama/Village Square; Akparanta II Open Space
Nembe	Ogbolomabiri 11	Isoukiri Comp/Post Office; C. P. S/School Compound; Owusegi Polo/Owusegi Polo Square; Obiene Compound/Health Centre; Chief Ockiya Comp/Ockiya Comp. Square; Dedesaratibi/Dedesaratibi Square; Agbutubu Polo/Market Square; Igabu Polo/Igabu Polo Square; Beleupogu/Beleupogu Square; Poni Polo/Poni Polo Square; Poni Polo11/Aruwari Square; Chief Kuku/Chief Kuku Square; Sekiapu Wari/Sekiapu Wari Square; Chief Amangi/Chief Amangi Square
Nembe	Ogbolomabiri 111	Ogbari Polo/Ogbari Polo Square; Ayamain Polo/Ayamain Polo Square; Ayamain Polo/N. N. G. S. Compound; Otari Open Space; Ogipiri/Hospital; Chief Basuo Polo/Basuo Compound. Square; Chief Ikata Polo/Ikata Comp. Square; Major Nyanayo Polo/Ikata Compound Square; Bundu Area/Cyristal Nur. Prim. School Area (Amasara).; Otatubu 1/School Compound; Otatubu 11/Opupolo Tiri; Biantubu/Village Square
Nembe	Bassambiri 1	Sikaka Polo/King Ogbodo Square; Sikaka Polo/Ina Polo Square; Onyoma/Compound Square; Ilulu 1/Agric Quarters; Oruamabiri/Town Square; Oruamabiri/Opupogu Open Space; G. S. S Nembe/School Compound; Chief Ngozi/Chief Ngozi Square; Biatubu / Village Square; Ilulu 11/Lga Staff Quarters; Ilulu 111/Alabarabas Compound
Nembe	Bassambiri 11	Mein Polotiri/ Mein Musel Square; Mein Polotiri Mein Polo Square; Esewdu Area/ School I Compound; King Ralph Iwowari /Civic Centre; Egbelu Polo/ Egelu Musel; Pegi Polo/Pegi Polo Square; Osain Polo/Pegi Polo Square; Otiotio Polo/Otiotio Square; Igbebeleu Polo/Derri Square; Omiekiri/Omie Square; Derrikiri/Derri Compound Square; Sandfield Area/S. S II Compound; Sandfield Area/L. G. A Square; First Baptist Church Area/ Church Mission
Nembe	Bassambiri 111	Okipiri/Village Square; Okipiri/School Compound; Kalabila Ama/Village Square; Kalabila Ama/School Compound; Botokiri/ Village Square; Akalukiri/Village Square; Butubugo/Village Square; Fedel Polo
Nembe	Bassambiri 1v	Obioku/Town Hall; Adumama/Village Square; Seriakiri/Village Square; Nyounkiri/Village Square; Dannikiri/Village Square; Akanaga/Village Square; Monday Kiri/Monday Kiri Square; Eyeritekiri Open Space
Nembe	Igbeta-Ewoama/Fantuo	Igbeta-Ewoama/Iwodu Polo; Opupolotiri/Opupolotiri Square; Igbeta-Ewoama Central/Ideridu Polo Square; Etiema/School Compound; Kiri Pogu Ewokiri/School Compound; Sabatoru/School Compound; Obiama/Central Hall; Amapogu/Kiminin/Central Hall; Agbakabiriyai/School Compound; Ijaw Kiri/Fish Camp; Igabukiri/School Compound; Ebikiri/Edwinikiri/Fish Camp; Onunu-Ama/Onunu-Ama Square; Burukiri/Burukiri Village Square; Kukukiri/Village Square; Okokokiri/School Compound; Iselema Borikiri/Fish Camp; Dongo Iwogha/Dongoi Wogha Square; Ewelesuo/School Compound; Kpongbokiri/Fish Camp (17); Oigonotokolo/Kiniama/Fish Camp; Nembe Creek/S. S. Compound; Warisegbene/Village Square (18); Angalakoro Bousei/Fish Camp; Abuja/School Compound; Sch. Compound Fantuo
Nembe	Okoroma 1	Chief Kanty Comp/Chief Kanty Square; Chief Ovo Comp/Chief Ovo Square; Chief Ovo Comp 11/School Building; Akakumama/Town Square; Adikiamaadikiama Square; Ombukiri/Ombukiri Market; Eminama/School Compound; Obakilolo/School Compound; Akariakiri Open Space; Ibu Open Space; Ogbatigbekiri Village Square; Diete Polo/Diete Compound; Adah Polo Open Space; Edika Polo Open Space; Ekperikiri/Ekperikiri Village Square; Basuokiri/Basuo Village Square; Oluwuama Open Space; Golubokin Open Space; Onibugo/Onibugo Village Square
Nembe	Okoroma 11	Ologoama Sch. Compound; Ologoama 11 Village Square; Ewokiri Village Square; Doguewoama Village Square; Alagoitereke Village Square; Kagokiri Village Square; Dogu Ewoama II Open Space; Elepa Village Square; Oguama 1 Village Square; Oguama 11 School Compound; Sangakubu Village Square; Orukarikiri Orukarikiri Square; Oguama III Open Space; Sounkiri Village Square; Mansonkiri Mansoni Square
Nembe	Mini	Agrisaba Village Square; Obemeke Village Square; Agrisaba School Compound; Enyumama School Compound; Egunelugu Village Square; Fikorukiri Village Square; Sangabene Village Square; Abalama Village Square; Edoghoama Edoghoama; Jimama Jimama Square; Eleliama Eleiama Square; Akariama Akari Square; Okoroba Village Square; Elemama Village Square; Abuama Polo Village Square; Apolologi Comound Square; Izagama Hospital Area; Elemuama II Open Space
Nembe	Ikensi	Ikensi Town Square; Korobokiri Compound Square; Iwokiri Ikensi Compound Square; Ss Ikensi School Building; Amabitteama Town Hall; Agada Town Square; Agada School Compound; Agada Compound Square; Obita Compound Square; Obita School Building; Obita Community Hall; Atubo School Building; Atubo Town Hall; Atubo Opupugo; Sangapiri Village Square; Biokponga Town Hall; Biokponga School Building; Iseleogono Town Square; Iseleogono School Building; Ndatiri Village Square; Shellkiri School Compound; Sansan Village Square; Sonikiri Village Square; Omielakiri Village Square; Kampala Village Square; Ikirikari Village Square; Tweni Tweni Square; Peter Town Village Square
Nembe	Oluasiri	Otumama Town Square; Tengelekiri Town Square; Benama Town Square; Ijawkiri Town Square; Amieseikiri Village Square; Etukekiri Village Square; Waribonkiri Village Square; Monibokiri Village Square; Wenikiri Village Square; Oiduani Village Square; Isaiahma Village Square; Iserekiri Village Square; Karikiri Village Square; Dumoebikumakiri Village Square; Fikoruama Village Square; Dualambokibi Village Square
Ogbia	Ogbia	G. S. S. Ogbia Town; Market Square Ogia Town; Apologbo - Ogbia; Akumugi - Ogbia; Pyn - Ogbia; Victory - Ogbia; Upe - Ogbia; Adionin - Ogbia; Obodiri - Idema; Okiroma - Idema; Emalo - Idema; Eboh - Idema; Obeduma - Obeduma; Adueni - Idema
Ogbia	Otuokpoti	Oguta - Otuokpoti; Agosuan - Otuokpoti; S. S. Otuokpoti 1; C. S. S. Otuokpoti; Agotoma Otuokpoti; Obenema - Otuokopi; S. S. - Otuokpoti 11; S. S. - Otuogori; S. S. - Otuegwe 1; Town Square - Otuegwe 1; S. S. Onuebum; Otuam Camp-Onuebum; Eboko Camp-Onuebum; Otama - Ebum - Onuebum; Igobasi - Onuebum; Obaguo - Onuebum; Abhokasi - Onuebum; Iribo - Onuebum; Iduguna - Otuegwe 1
Ogbia	Ologi	Derime - Ayakoro; S. S. Ayakoro; Deinbo - Ayakoro; Igbikina - Ayakoro; Omomema - Ayakoro; Ogbuku - Ayakoro; Orua - Ayakoro; Obein - Ayakoro; Ogbara - Ayakoro; Ode Camp - Ologi; S. S. Ologi; Apolo - Ogbo- Ologi; Obenari - Ologi; Village - Ologi; Omyi - Ologi; Obaguo - Ologi; S. S. Otuedu; Camp Square - Otuedu; Obaku - Otuedu
Ogbia	Anyama	S. S. Anyama- Anyama Town I; S. S. Anyama - Anyama Town II; Aduba - Anyama Town; Igwe - Anyama Town; Otu Igoin Anyama Town Hall; Adema - Anyama Town; Anyama - Anyama Town; Atari - Anyama Town; Ikpesu - Anyama Town; Ewi - Anyama Town; G. S. S - Anyama Town; S. S. Ologohe; Apolo - Osuan - Ologohe; Apolo - Otama - Ologohe; Apolo - Ogbo - Ologohe; S. S. Otuobhi - Otuobhi Town; Atubu - Otuobhi Town; Obes - Otuobhi Town; Obhi-Iyi - Otuobhi Town; S. S. Okiki- Okiki Town; Emadug- Okiki Town; Okiki (2) - Okiki Town; Otuakanagu, S. S.; S. S. Otuekpein; Apologbo - Otuepein
Ogbia	Okodi	Town Hall - Okodi; S. S. Okodi - Okodi Town; Etirologi - Okodi; Ogalaga - Okodi; Iyowoi - Okodi; Jeremiah Camp - Okodi; Sunny Camp - Okodi; Owede Camp - Okodi; Imiki Camp - Okodi; S. S. Ewama - Ewama Town; S. S. Epebu; Town Hall - Epebu Town; Krakrama - Epebu Town; Apologbo - Epebu Town; Otutu - Epebu Town; S. S. Emadike; Otukuru - Emadike; Town Hall - Emadike; London Area Epebu; Obed Camp; Owili Camp; Jacsony Camp
Ogbia	Otuasega	G. S. S. Otuasega; Otuasega Town Hall; Otuasega Town Centre; New Layout - Otuasega; S. S. Otuasega; Oruma Town Hall; S. S. Oruma I; Oruma Newlayout; Olodiama - Oruma; Amayanaowe- Oruma; Olodiama II - Oruma; S. S. Oruma II; Funtiri - Oruma; Otue - Egwe II Town Hall; S. S. Ibelebiri; New Avenue - Ibelebiri; Ibelebiri Town Hall
Ogbia	Emeyal	Emeyal I Town Hall; Emeyal I Obenema; Town Hall - Emeya II; Awusa Comp. - Emeya II; Ogbarakim - Emeya II; R. C. M. - Emeya II; Oil Mill - Emeya II; Elema - Emeya II; Otuogboruma - Emeya II; Town Hall - Emeyal II; Cat Guest House 11; Ekpodidi - Emeyal II
Ogbia	Imiringi	Obenema - Imiringi; Imiringi Town Hall; Iyi - Imiringi; S. S. Imiringi; Power Station; Chief Owudogu - Imiringi; Better Land Elebele; Town Hall - Elebele; Apolo-Ogbo - Elebele; Risonpalm J. R. Q - Elebele; S. S. - Elebele; Obenema Elebele; Ebel - Elebele; Idibol - Elebele; Shell Station Imiringi; Village Sq-Imiringi; Apolo-Otama-Elebele; Apolo-Osuan Elebele
Ogbia	Kolo	Kolo I Town Hall; Health Centre Kolo 1; Kolo II Town Hall; Waiting Shed Kolo II; Open Ground Kolo II; Kolo III Town Hall; Police Station Kolo III; Civic Centre Kolo III; S. S. Amorokeni; Kolo II Play Ground; Otuodu Centre Kolo II; Otuogle Kolo II; Kolo Health C. Kolo I; Out - Adigi Kolo III
Ogbia	Oloibiri	O. G. S. Oloibiri; S. K. Ibegu-Oloibiri; Native Court Oloibiri; Play Ground - Oloibiri; Amangala - Oloibiri; Ewoama - Oloibiri; S. S. - Oloibiri; Iyokpo - Oloibiri; Civic Centre - Oloibiri; Oloibiri Court Hall
Ogbia	Opume	Otuekon - Opume; Amarokon - Opume; Paradise - Opume; Adumo Sq - Opume; Oze - Opume; S. S. - Opume; Esan - Opume; Oyilolo - Opume; Imoti - Opume; Okoin - Opume; Inetimi - Opume; Isibo - Opume; Otu/Igwe-Opume; Owei - Emakalakala; Aribo Square (Emakalakala); S. S. Emakalakala; Ibidi Square - Emakalakala; Dede Sq. - Emakalakala; Owaba - Emakalakala; Igababa - Akipelai; Aba - Akipelai; Akaraka; School Mission, Akipelai; Akipelai Play Ground
Ogbia	Otakeme	Otuogal - Otakeme; Dangosu - Otakeme; Mac-Eteli Comp - Otakeme; S. S. - Otakeme; Apolo-Suan - Otakeme; Odogu - Otakeme; S. S. Otegila - Otakeme; Otuogidi S. S. - Otuogidi; Efawari - Otuogidi; Ikeni Camp - Otuogidi; Fabere - Otuogidi; S. S. Abobiri Abobiri Town; Abobiri Town Hall; Agric Station - Abobiri; U. P. E. - Otabagi; B. S. A. Square. Otabagi; Ibholans - Otabagi; Ebede Camp - Otabagi; S. S. Otabi - Otabi Town; Waiting Shed - Otabi; Town Hall - Otabi; S. S. Akoloman - Otabi; Ndele Camp, Otabagi; Ozu Camp Otuogidi; Shell Otuogidi
Ogbia	Otuabula	S. S. Otuabula I; Otuagberisi - Otubula 1; Ologo - Gbo - Otuabula; Ogurumata - Otuabula; Afe - Otuabula I; Abi - Otuabula I; Obanema - Otuabula I; Alagba - Otuabula I; Akalaogolo - Otuabula I; Mission - Otuabula I; S. S. Otuabula II; Obakubo - Otuabula II; Apolo - Ogbo - Otuabula II; Agbal - Otuabula II; Akpemkpem - Otuabula II; S. S. Otuoke - Otuoke Town; Oru Comp. Otuoke Town; Aworabhi - Otuoke Town; Apolo - Otama - Otuoke Town; Apolo Osuan - Otuoke; Ewokiri - Otuoke; S. S. Otuaba - Otuaba Town; Otuaba Town Hall; Apolo - Ogbo - Otuaba; Adema - Otuaba Town; Otama - Otuaba Town; Elabio - Otuaba Town; Emabi - Otuaba Town; Ogotoru - Otuaba Town; S. S. Ewoi - Ewoi Town; Atubu - Ewoi Town; Otuayeleba - Ewoi Town; Ituma's Palace - Ewoi Town; Abula Camp - Otuabula I; Omomema - Otuaka; Oyain Otuaba; Ogbogi Otuaba; Otuase Otuabula; Otazi Play Ground; Orubiri Open Square
Sagbama	Agbere	Ayama; Cps Hall I; Tuburukunu - Cps Hall 11; Kakarabiri, Cps Hall III; Tambiri, Cps Hall Iiii; Biugbene, Comm. Square; Egbonnei - Awa, Comm. Square; Gboku/Abarugu-Ama, Comm. Square; Opokumaowei/Ovuruama Town; Odokowari, Comm. Square; Ogbokiriama, Comm. Square
Sagbama	Angalabiri	Bemaware; Cps Hall I; Bemaware; Cps Hall II; Okaugbene - Comp Square; Deiware - Town Hall; Oruereware - Comp. Square; Tamobiri - Tamobiri Comp.; Akpanakakaware - Cps Hall; Afromata - Cps Hall II; Odumarighagbene - Css Hall; Ogidipelei - Css Hall; Tuburubiri - Comp. Square; Ayaogbo - Comp. Square; Ogbigbene - Comp. Square I; Ogbigbene - Comp. Square II; Welsonware, Prim. School Hall; Egbeinware - Primary School Hall; Guaware - Guare Square; Aramabiri - Primary School Hall II; Kalaboye - Kalaboye Square; Torukubu - Comm. Town Hall; Olodiamaware - Comp. Square; Owologbebe - Town Square; Taramagbene - Sec. Sch. Hall; Dukunu - Comm. Town Hall; Teinkunu - Town Square; Ozigboware - Comp. Square; Teinkunu - Town Square II
Sagbama	Ofoni I	Ogberidoloediagbo - Town Hall; Ogberedafe - Town Hall; Ugbegoro - Ugbegoro House; Okedi - Cps I Ofoni; Etefe - Cps III Ofoni; Ovwodokpokpo - Ogbe Cps III; Kalabai - Css Ofoni; Erhuruto - Cps IV Ofoni; Egbo - Town Hall; Okedi II - Cps I Ofoni; Egbo II - Town Hall
Sagbama	Ofoni II	Ogberiroro - Cps II Ofoni; Ogberufuoma - Cps II Ofoni; Eamuto - Ogbe Hall; Ekadeya - Ogbe Hall; Ubrowhawha - Town Hall; Ubrogbo - Town Hall; Esefena - Cps IV Ofoni; Utorode - Cps II Ofoni; Estitsora - Town Hall; Ovwodokpokpo - Cps I Ofoni
Sagbama	Ebedebiri	Agbobuware - Govt. Rest, House; Ayarenware - Cps Hall I; Ebunuanware - Rest House; Ayetoroware - Town Square; Etuaware Town Square; Abeniware - Town Square; Ayamaware/Ogonuwari - Cps Hall; Egereware - Govt. Rest House; Ogbazi - Comp Sqr; Oforu Ware - Comp. Square; Ayabiri - Ayabiri Hall; Opoubagbene - Market Hall; Foubiri - Market Square; Olokaware - Market Square; Epanbogbene - Cps Hall; Arehware -Cps Hall; Tiegbede - Comp. Square; Okoloma - Comp. Square; Oforipeepei - Market; Boubiri - Market Square
Sagbama	Ossiama	Tanyin - Town Hall; Kurobiri/Kingpolo - Town Hall; Akoromobiri - Market Square; Omubiri/Kpankpoware - Town Hall; Kilebiri - Town Hall; Warrigbene - Cps Hall; Egbepulogbene Cps I; Opupolo - Cps Hall II; Awegbene - Town Hall; Ogbonugbene Compound Square 1; Ogbonugbene Compound Square 11
Sagbama	Asamabiri	Ayama - Primary School; Tamukunu - Primary School; Ebiegbede Town Hall; Odubogbaogbo - Comp. Square; Olomu - Comp. Square; Eproh - Anam Camp; Ekperiware - Town Hall; Akpedi - Comp Hall; Kariazi - Primary School Hall; Africa - Sec. School Hall; Ofoniawor - Comp, Square; Akpede - Town Hall; Oruama - Comp. Square; Otuasamoh - Comp. Square
Sagbama	Odoni	Gbekebor - Comp Square; Ogbo - Odoni - Comp . Square; Pou-Odoni - Comp. Square; Tamu - Odoni - Comp. Square; Eweri - Comp. Square; Ubagbene/Amakiri Ogbo - Comp Square; Gbetam - Ama-Comp. Square; Owoubiriama - Comp. Square; Nakuna - Ama- Comp. Square; Owusa Beniniama - Comp. Square; Aduku - Cps Hall; Akemi - Comp. Square
Sagbama	Trofani	Abazi - Comp. Square; Pinaboseigha - Sec. Sch. Hall; Afiaware - Sec. Sch. Hall; Okpobiri - Comp Square; Abrudonor - Comp Square; Ekorikori - Comp. Square
Sagbama	Sagbama	Oweinamazi/Ozala - Comp. Square; Embarebazi - Comp. Square; Adweze/Azawozi - Comp. Square; Indiamazi/Ayama - Comp Square; Kokpo - Comp Square; Sagbama - Comp Square; Okorozi - Comp Square; Oguoumugudu - Comp Square; Oluozi/Obuware -Comp Square; Bank Road - Comp. Square; Ayama -Comp. Square; Olieware - Comp. Square; Yindimie -Comp. Square; Amadikurumor -Comp. Square; Ereware -Comp. Square
Sagbama	Agoro	Donyeware - Town Hall; Tambiri - Comp Square; Ogiowouware - Comp. Square; Koriabiri -Comp. Square; Bolougbene - Comp. Square; Egogobiri Camp Square; Ogboinbiri - Comp. Square; Eselemere - Comp. Square; Agidigbo - Agidigbosquare; Ayaogbo - Ayaogbo Square; Ekodoware/Kinside - Town Hall; Awotoware - Awotoware Hall; Lolokunu - Rest House; Abukobiri - Tare Comp.; Tamobiri - Town Hall; Ayama - Rest House; Ogboinbiri - Town Hall; Foupele - Market Square; Afoubiri-Afoubiri Square; Okoroware Compound Square; Tikpiware Compound Square
Sagbama	Toru-Ebeni	Ayama/Egbabiri - Sec. Sch. Hall; Emgbelebiri - Prim. Sch. Hall; Eneinware - Prim. Sch. Hall; Toborobiri - Prim. Sch. Hall; Tamobiri - Tamobiri Hall; Agouware - Agouware Square; Okoroware Comp. Square; Tikpiware - Comp. Square; Agbanabiri/Kingpolo - Town Hall; Okoroware Square; Asenware/Agbereware - Town Hall
Sagbama	Adagbabiri	Ayama - Ayama Square I; Ayama - Ayama Square II; Ogboinbiri - Community Square; Ogboinbiri - Prim. Sch. Hall; Olobodo - Olobodo Square; Ezewo/Eruewe, Eruewe Square; Ayama/Undubiri - Sec. Sch. Hall; Balawae -Sec. Sch. Hall; Tambiri - Sec. Sch. Hall; Okuru Ogbo - Ware - Comp. Square; Apoyibiri - Comp Square; Kanabiri - Comp. Square; Aroribiri - Comp. Square; Akereye/Ekumotimi/Ekumotu - Town Hall; Ekumokou - Towh Hall; New Patani/Aye Adagba Biri - Comp. Square
Sagbama	Osekwenike	Osekwenike Town Hall; Okpowowo/Irri - Waiting Shade; Oyede/Uto - C. P. S. I. Hall; Uwekpe - Comm. Rest House; Ogborogbo - Market Square; Obou - Market Square; Okugbazu - Lane - Rest House; Atu - Osekwenike Comp. Square; Osifo - Comm. Town Hall; Abuetor - Rest House; Opata - C. P. S. Hall I; Okudeli - Church Comm.; Kanan - Town Hall; Kanan - C. P. S. Hall I
Southern Ijaw	Oporoma 1	Wenike Community Hall; Koluama Community Square; Ogboinbiri Community Square; Agigbebiri Town Hall I; Agigbebiri Town Hall II; Korobiri Town Hall; Ogumin Polo Primary School; Opubiri Primary School I; Opubiri Primary School II; Opubiri Primary School III; Synclair Primary School; Ayakoro Community Square; Alama Community Square; Ala - Owu Community Square; Kelsy Community Square; Seaman Community Square; Fuoebi Community Square; Agidi Gbene Primary School; Gbene Primary School; Olomasumu/Logi Primary School; Tarighe Primary School; Laka Secondary School; Ebeleke Secondary School; Toruyai / Ogio Comm. Square; Opuindi / Ogbuah Comm. Square; Ogbopolo Comm. Square; Perewari Comm. Sqr.; Alomobiri Pri. Sch.; Fiaboubiri Pri. Sch.; Perealomo Pri. Sch.; Asumapolo Comm. Sqr.; Akebiripolo Comm. Sqr; Buru Mene Comm. Sqr.; Odu's Compound Pri. Sch.; Akoris Compound Pri. Sch.
Southern Ijaw	Oporoma II	Adubabiri Open Space I; Adubabiri Open Space II; Isianlubo Open Space; Olotubiri Open Space; Toborukunu Open Space; Okolobiri Open Space; Aguo Open Space; Igonibiri Open Space; Iyorobiri Open Space; Anyamawari Open Space; Duamabiri Open Space; Amiebiri Open Space; Ombuwari Open Space; Samwari Open Space; Osokoama Open Space I; Osokoama Open Space II; Igburu Open Space; Ogbobiri Pri. Sch.; Otuobiri Pri. Sch.; Okuta Pri. School; Agbolo Pri. Sch.; Obolobiri Comm. Square; Oweikorogha Toru Comm. Square; Obubarabiri Comm. Square
Southern Ijaw	Olodiama I	Samsipou Open Space; Eguewari Open Space; Owoso Polo Open Space; Seibiri Open Space; Igaliwari Open Space; Egbedebiri Open Space; Akabawari Comm. Square; Iginama Comm. Sqr; Danlo / Opetu Pri. Sch.; Ikpabiri Pri. Sch.; Kumo Open Space; Opu - Kumo Open Space; Kala - Kumo Open Space; Ikemeke Pri. Sch.; Tamakunu Pri. Sch.; Ogbain Pri. Sch.; Ikebiri Pri. Sch.; Okosi Comm. Square; Okomo Torupa; Asoko Polo Open Space; Apuntaghe Open Space; Sorighe Open Space; Amawele / Dumu Open Space; Okoko - Odu Open Space; Odu - Polo Open Space; Umbu Primary School
Southern Ijaw	Olodiama II	Abebiri Open Space; Aborowari Open Space; Esumie Lubo Open Space; Akpokowari Open Space; Ikpesewari Open Space; Izumo / Oloubiri Open Space; Sasei / Oloubiri Open Space; Okonro Open Space; Karabai Wari Open Space; Eregbolo Wari Open Space; Oluobiri II Open Space; Otokogbene Open Space; Otoruwei Wari Open Space; Bomoboro Open Space; Toni Wari Open Space; Iwere Wari Open Space; Diriki; Leghe; Zingoghe; Ebeke Open Space; Tebi Open Space; Oka Open Space; Azime Open Space; Ogbointuwa Open Space; Akpotu Open Space; Sere Open Space; Korodou Open Space; Zuwoniwari Open Space; Zuwen Open Space
Southern Ijaw	Otuan	Opouwari Open Space; Punguwari Open Space; Orousuodei Polo Open Space; Okotowari Comm. Square; Egei Polo Comm. Square; Miekoromoyifa Pri. School; Anye Pele Wari Pri. Sch.; Odou - Polo Pri. Sch.; Atila Comm. Square; Ayama Polo Comm. Square; Agbewari Open Space; Lucky Wari Open Space; Kanguru Open Space; Ombolo Open Space; Digifa Comm. Square; Biekaton Pri. Sch.; Okosuagbe Pri. Sch.; Koruowei - Wari Comm. Square; Kpewari Secondary Sch.; Adeyin Town Hall; Akpoafagha Secondary Sch.; Egbebiri Secondary School; Ofoni Wari Secondary Sch.
Southern Ijaw	West Bomo	Zion Open Space; Opue Dule Open Space; Egbewari Open Space; Boutuwari / Efefe Open Space; Ofongo Polo Open Space; Lasukugbene Comm. Square; Churchikiri Church Square; Agadakuro Comm. Square; Saka Comm. Square; Inigulu Comm. Square; Oputu - Gbene Comm. Square; Oseke - Gbene Comm. Square; Babere Gbene Comm. Square I; Babere Gbene Comm. Square II
Southern Ijaw	Central Bomo I	Ipain Polo Comm. Square; Igula Polo Comm. Square; Ogbobiri Comm. Square; Tamakunu Comm. Square; Torububou - Gbene Comm. Square; Lue - Gbene Comm. Square; Amien You - Gbene Pri. Sch.; Asun Gbene Pri. Sch.; Ikitibobiri Pri. Sch.; Dugo - Gbene Pri. Sch.; Nange - Gbene Open Space; Bile Open Space; Duncan Open Space
Southern Ijaw	Central Bomo II	Alamie Polo Open Space; Akubiri / Akutabi Open Space; Iba Polo Open Space; Isunibiri Open Space; Ogbain / Omounibiri Open Space; Ikoromo Gbene Open Space; Oyeregbene Open Space I; Amasuo / Okokodia Comm. Square; Alamain / Ibeli / Yekpu Comm. Square; Bodei / Idomu Comm. Square; Oyeregbene Play Ground
Southern Ijaw	Amassoma I	Ofiou / Oporoma Open Space; Apoi / Ogoi II Open Space; Ogoi I / Enere Open Space; Bala - Biri Comm. Square; Ogula Sadiemo Comm. Square; Ama - Ogbo Comm. Square; Diegbegha Comm. Square; Avi Open Space; Okosi Town Hall; Agbedi Town Hall; Owolo Market Square; Amiekoro Market Square; Ebiede Comm. Square; Oyinki Comm. Square; Ere Comm. Square; Agbologbo Pri. Sch.; Binatongha Pri. Sch.; Kime Open Space; Asenekiri Town Hall; Adegbeduno Town Hall; Okodi Open Space; Aruko - Owei Open Space; Ayibe Open Space; Berenengi Open Space; Bowman's Egbe Hall
Southern Ijaw	Amassoma II	Dick Secondary School; Biriabebe Secondary Sch.; Saniyigha Secondary Sch.; Eneware Secondary Sch.; Asare Secondary Sch.; Sikdi Secondary School; Alamie Comm. Square; Meinmein Comm. Square; Tuguru Comm. Sch.; Preye Comm. Square; Subiriowei Comm. Square; Igoniwari Comm. Square; Igariowei Comm. Square; Kabonwei Market Square; Ekpere Market Square; Fiayigha Market Square; Tonweriyai Market Square; Makpah Market Square; Awogbo Comm. Square; Katar Comm. Square; Amatolo Comm. Square I; Amatolo Comm. Square II; Amatolo Comm. Square III; Oba - Aka I; Oba - Aka II; Oba - Aka III
Southern Ijaw	Amassoma III	Ebuku Open Space; Emen Open Space; Gbese Open Space; Fekorigha Open Space; Onuguru Open Space; Omonibo Comm. Hall; Tangbe Open Space; Agbesi Open Space; Koroimbi Open Space; Dide Open Space; Ibomo Open Space; Korobonumugha Pri. Sch.; Biowei Comm. Square; Isoboduno Comm. Square; Ayateme Comm Square; Olotukeme Open Space; Okoyagba Town Hall; Asia - Asia Town Hall; Adaka Town Hall; Dazi Town Hall; Zukumo Pri. Sch. I; Zukumo Pri. Sch. II; Zukumo Pri. Sch. III; Zukumo Pri. Sch. IV
Southern Ijaw	East Bomo I	Ikoli / Toru Polo Open Space; Aruweribrir / Owo Open Space; Emeinkiri / Ikolikiri Open Space; Ajalakiri /Kpougbene Open Space; Gospel Kiri / Kekekiri Open Space; Obodo Open Space; Foni Open Space; Kele Open Space; Finidei Open Space; Imgbele / Ikelibiri Pri. Sch.; Alegbebiri / Tamakunu Pri Sch.; Ogiobiri / Ayakoro Pri. Sch.; Ololubiri /Ogbionasa Pri. Sch.; Ogulapolo / Alegbebiri Pri. Sch.; Imgbele / Ikelibiri Open Space; Alegbebiri / Tamakunu Open Space; Ayama Open Space; Osewaribiri Town Hall; Orugbe Town Hall; Osainpolo Town Hall; Arugbe Town Hall; Ayakoro Gbene Town Hall; Pata Gbene Town Hall; Ayakoroama Town Hall; Ayakoro Town Hall; Asain Town Hall; Osei Town Hall; David Polo Town Hall; Emete 76 Comm. Sqr
Southern Ijaw	East Bomo II	Opupolo; Ibubu Polo Open Space; Ozonigbopo Open Space; Outabiri Open Space; Lakabiri Open Space; Tugogbene Open Space; Opu Polo Open Space; Ayougbene Open Space; Opupolo Open Space; Abagbene Comm. Square; Ipirigbene Comm. Square; Ogilagbene Comm. Square; Kemeingbene Comm. Square; Akpomugbene Comm. Square; Akamabugo Open Space; Okigbene Open Space; Ayama Open Space; Dukugbene Open Space; Miegbene Open Space; Fire Bagbene Open Space
Southern Ijaw	Foropa	Binibeleu Open Space I; Binibeleu Open Space II; Bobai - Idumu Comm. Square I; Bobai - Idumu Comm. Square II; Kurubiri Comm. Square I; Kurubiri Comm. Square II; Apie - Idumu I; Kasa Bobou Pri. Sch.; Oputa Raita Pri. Sch.; Okuntu Furu Gbene Pri. Sch.; Tangbe Ghegbene Pri. Sch.; Dukugbene Pri. Sch.; Ambekigbene Pri. Sch.; Anthony Gbene Comm. Square; Ekeni I Open Space I; Ekeni II Open Space II; Ekeni III Open Space III; Ekeni IV Open Space IV; Ezetu Pri. Sch.; Apalakiri Pri. School; Ogogoro Pri. Sch.; Azaigbo Comm. Square; Finfiasa Comm. Square; Opuaduno Comm. Square; Geligeli Gbene Comm. Square; Lalabein Comm. Square; Suobougbene Pri. Sch.; Zion Open Space; Sikotua Open Space
Southern Ijaw	Apoi	Apoitub Open Space; Kalasuogobene Open Space; Akobeleuwei Open Space; Tubutu Pri. Sch.; Oduagbene Pri. Sch.; Asio Gbene Pri. Sch.; Kala Gbene Pri. Sch.; Tubu Gbene Pri. Sch.; Tebu Gbene Pri. Sch.; Ogidi / Zakana Comm. Square; Okuku / Ayela Comm. Square; Otongholozi / Opuama; Diefa / Opu - Zion Comm. Square; Ekenbiri / Ondegbene Open Space; Tebikuno Open Space; Kurukuru Open Space; Kapabiri / Imen Polo Comm. Square; Agbezi Polo Comm. Square; Dapolo / Afuwo Polo; Kpuruwei Comm. Square; Agi Polo Comm. Square; Fangbe Polo Comm. Square; Ogboinbiri Comm. Square; David House Hamlet Open Space; Okpowari Hamlet Open Space; Azama Open Space; Tuboyanbiri Open Space; Sampou Open Space; Tugboyanbiri Open Space
Southern Ijaw	Ukubie	Oweibowari Open Space; Oloubra Open Space; Yamiwari Open Space; Ediri Open Space; Ukubie Feu Open Space; Agie Open Space; Yabitarighe/Binibientei Open Space; Gbozu-Ama/Ebioruama Open Space; Olou/Ogbodo-Idumu Open Space; Okolobiri Open Space; Ebizum Open Space; Lobia II Primary School; Lobia Market Mkt Square; Tabenacle Zion Mkt Square; Royal Zion Open Space I; Royal Zion Open Space II; Dada Comp Community Square; Ariwei Polo Community Square; Dada's Comp Community Square; Ongeghe Polo Community Square; Olodo Polo Community Square; Ayarau Community Square; Duwoun Community Square; Abi-Otu Primary School; Ofieseighe Primary School; Kpile Primary School; Ebikiri Zion Primary School; Donbo Idumu Primary School; Agoro Polo Primary School; Dauebi Open Space; Ebitei Open Space; Koko Open Space; Tonyon Primary School; Aaron Primary School
Southern Ijaw	Koluama	Akpele Open Space; Nana/Goli Open Space; Mangi Open Space; Pafe Open Space; Sapere Primary School; Gbinegbene Primary School; Beinhin Open Space; Ikalamo Open Space; Osaisaikiri Open Space; Loveday Open Space; Betto Open Space; Apele Open Space; Nanabo Open Space; Goli Open Space; Mangge Open Space; Adowei I Open Space; Adowei II Open Space; Koluama Feu Open Space; Kiriseighe Gbene Open Space
Yenagoa	Attissa I	Peletia Town Hall; Fankpo Square; Erigbe Comp. Square; Fankile Town Hall; Government House Agric; Peletie Comp. Primary School; Ibanni Comp. Square; U. A. C. Compound Square; Ogosi Compound Town Hall; Agric Meeting Hall; Yangosi Comp. Hall; Otobo Water Front Square; Fekumo Primary School; Kemekrogha Square; Ogbopele B. D. G. S; Fangide U. P. E; Fambue Square; Bunapamo Town Hall; Ebeneke Open Square; Fambuke Town Hall; Simeon Com. Square; Inewurubou Square; Fankebe Town Hall; Fandue Square; Fanmeme Town Hall; Fanogbo Square
Yenagoa	Attissa II	Ekperiwari Primary School; Igbunuwari Play Ground; Egbe Compound Square; Opinini Primary School; Bungata Square; Ogbian Square; Akasuo Town Hall; Yeneque Play Ground; Yenidah Primary School; Yenikpa Town Hall
Yenagoa	Attissa III	Yenekwe Town Hall Square; Ogbian Comp. Square; Ogbolo Primary School; Ogbolokiri Town Square; Biokpo Primary School; Yenigumu Town Square; Ibolo Primary School; Ibolokiri Compound Square; Fanye Primary School; Otuokpo Town Square; Ikile Square; Fangide Compound Square
Yenagoa	Epie I	Fankoa Town Square; Aruenghene Primary School; Yenikile Community Pri. Sch.; Fankpanigha Town Hall; Yenikeku Square; Izifa Sch. Hall; Otubogene Square; Biogbolo Primary School; Igumowei Square; Ogbobiri Community Pri. Sch.; Okulo Compound Hall; Makadiari (Azivie) Open Space; Okoria Market Square; Ogbosi Square; Pokoso Town Hall; Akenpai Town Hall; Yenegwe Town Hall
Yenagoa	Epie 11	Fantukua Primary School; Fambee School Hall; Fambee Polo Square; Isiebi Town Hall; Fambule Hall; Ozyi Square Community Sec. Sch.; Kenigbi Sch Hall; Utofa Town Square; Odudoba Primary School; Emmanuel Market Square; Finimighafi Primary School; Fanwa Ekunu Square; Fanwa Town Hall; Ekunu Old Town Hall; Barama Primary School; Fangule Square; Amawere Primary School; Awenne Town Hall; Akali Square; Abikaiwari Primary School; Okalikumo Town Hall
Yenagoa	Epie III	Ayamaze Comp.; Atamawolo Square; Fankien Square; Fanaba Primary School; Fanaye Square; Yenezue Town Hall; Central Kpansia Hall; Kpansia Sisibi Primary School; Odudoba Town Hall; Fanghe Primary School; Yenada Mk Square; Fambaramata Town Hall; Fambarata Square; Fankulubo Hall; Fakulu Primary School (East); Fankulu Primary School(West); Isiogu Town Square; Ogriga Town Hall; Fankuku Health Centre
Yenagoa	Gbarain I	Akiriwari Comp. Square; Ekewari Primary School; Ugbuouwari Square; Water Works Square; Ekenibiri Open Space; Teibiri Open Space; Boguwari Open Space; Igbenbiri Open Space; Okpobiri Open Space; Oguruwari Open Space; Oguru Open Space; Egburuwari Open Space; Eguru Open Space; Okipaliwari Open Space; Oguguwari Open Space; Wariogur II Open Space; Wariakpali Open Space
Yenagoa	Gbarain II	Tamukunu Open Space; Tuburukunu Open Space; County Hall; Agalama Open Space; Agbinpele Open Space; Okurupele Open Space; Asaingbene Open Space; Okotiama Open Space; Igbelepere Open Space; Anyamabiri Open Space; Olomani Open Space; Amakiriebiama Open Space; Umgbo/Tunu/Odunu Open Space; Okoni/Odia Open Space; Tarapa Open Space; Saibiri Open Space; Osando Open Space
Yenagoa	Gbarain III	Agwe Open Space; Agwerepolo Open Space; Bin/Sunnt Open Space; Igbain/Ukun Open Space; Oruama Open Space; Odubou Open Space; Amabiriwari Open Space; Beimo Open Space; Amabiri Open Space; Ize/Yewari Open Space; Opoku Open Space; Tamakunu Open Space; Oyoro Open Space
Yenagoa	Ekpetiama I	Toborokunu Open Space; Ogboele Open Space; Ikibiri Open Space; Isoumobon Open Space; Oyekewariopen Space; Ekwerewari Open Space; Olomowari Open Space; Agobypass Open Space; Oyeke Open Space; Ekwere Open Space; Daipere Open Space; Opotopo Open Space; Eguebiri Open Space; Isianlegi Open Space; Waxsongbene Open Space; Keiwari Open Space; Yengiwari Open Space; Igboumuwari Open Space
Yenagoa	Ekpetiama 11	Imagbelebiri Open Space; Birifabiri Open Space; Aduwo Open Space; Funyawari Open Space; Opuowei Open Space; Ayamabiri Open Space; Ubabiri Open Space; Dau-Okolo Open Space; Pinafuro Open Space; Dirimafuro Open Space
Yenagoa	Biseni 1	Ogointi Open Space; Tambiri Open Space; Oweiwari Open Space; Ajefonwari Open Space; Obumawari Open Space; Krisala Open Space; Kilamakunu Open Space
Yenagoa	Biseni 11	Apiawari Town Square; Ikoguwari Primary School; Ndiwari Town Square; Ivuruwari Primary School; Omediwari Square; Bulodisiwari -Hall; Erewari - Square; Obuwaniwari - Square; Ebilubo Square; Bodiwari Open Square; Okosikawari Square; Ozakarawari Square
Yenagoa	Okordia	Kala-Akumoni Open Space; Okubile-Akumoni Open Space; Okubile Open Space; Tein Open Space; Tuburu Open Space; Kaladu Open Space; Ikarama Open Space; Kaladuo Open Space; Free Town Open Space
Yenagoa	Zarama	Ayama School; Yame Play Ground; Gburu - Square; Bakovie Town Square; Bokunu Open Space; Bede Open Space; Okpufa Open Space; Ishotubo Open Space; Afineki Open Space; Midinabo Play Ground; Agba Square
