= Joy Nunieh =

Nigerian lawyer

Managing Director of Niger Delta Development Commission
- In office June 2019 – 19 February 2020
- Succeeded by: Kemebradikumo Pondei

Personal details
- Born: November 11
- Education: Rivers state University of Science and Technology

Joy Yimebe Nunieh is a Nigerian lawyer and former managing director of Niger Delta Development Commission (NDDC). She was sacked on 19 February 2020 by President Buhari and replaced immediately by Kemebradikumo Pondei. Nunieh was at the centre of NDDC scandal which laid allegations against Goodswill Akpabio.

== Early life and education ==
Nunieh was born on November 11, 1965, and grew up in a family of notable legal and political influence. She completed her law studies at the Rivers State University of Science and Technology (RSUST) in Port Harcourt, where she earned a law degree. Additionally, she attended the University of Port Harcourt for her undergraduate studies, establishing her as a well-educated and ambitious individual early in her career.

== Career ==
Nunieh is best known for her role as the Acting Managing Director of the Niger Delta Development Commission (NDDC), a position she held amidst considerable controversy. Before her tenure at NDDC, she had a career in law and public service, contributing to the development of her community and the wider region.

== Controversy ==
In January 2020, Nunieh found herself at the center of a corruption-related controversy when a civil society organization, the Anti-Corruption and Accountability Coalition Against Corruption, petitioned President Muhammadu Buhari. The group alleged that she had forged her educational certificates. According to their claims, she had fabricated documents to justify her qualifications. This led to a police investigation regarding the authenticity of her certificates, including her call-to-bar certification and other academic records.

Nunieh reportedly claimed in an affidavit that after the death of her sister, Barr. Mrs. Ledee Ndorbu-Ebenezer, she was unable to access her educational documents, which were in the possession of her late sister’s husband. The affidavit stated that despite repeated attempts, she could not recover these important documents.

The National Youth Service Corps (NYSC) was also involved in the controversy. While a letter from the Council of Legal Education confirmed Nunieh's mobilization for the NYSC program in 1989/1990, the NYSC Directorate could not find any records indicating that she had participated in the scheme.
