= Preye Oseke =

Nigerian politician from Bayelsa State

Preye Influence Goodluck Oseke (born 27 May 1976) is a Nigerian politician and member of the Federal House of Representatives in the 9th National Assembly.

== Background and education ==
Oseke was born in 1967 in Ogboinbiri, southern Ijaw Local Government Area of Bayelsa State. He began his primary school education in 1983 at Apoi Clan Central School in Ogboinbiri town where he earned a First School Leaving Certificate in 1987. He enrolled in Bishop Dimieari Grammar School (BDGS) Yenagoa for his secondary education and finished with Senior Secondary School Certificate, SSCE in 1993. He earned a bachelor's degree in Public Administration from the University of Port Harcourt in 2012.

== Political career ==
Oseke was elected to the Federal House of Representatives from Southern Ijaw Federal Constituency on the ticket of All Progressives Congress in 2019. His election was challenged in courts but reaffirmed as the winner of the election. In 2021, his lawyer, Andrew Chukwuemerie a law professor and Senior Advocate of Nigeria, SAN sued Oseke for defaulting to pay legal fees for his 2019 election litigations. Oseke was a member of the House Committee on Diaspora in the 9th assembly.

In 2022, he won the nomination of APC with 16,511 votes to run for a second term in the House of Representatives. In the February 25, 2023, election he was defeated by the candidate of the People's Democratic Party, PDP who polled 13,992 while incumbent Oseke scored 12,992 votes.
