= Edem (name) =

Edem is both a surname and a given name. Notable people with the name include:

== Surname ==
- Edem (rapper) (Denning Edem Hotor, born 1986), Ghanaian musician
- Emem Edem (born 1983), Nigerian sprinter
- Mike Edem (Anie-Ebiet Michael Edem, born 1989), Canadian football player
- Offiong Edem (born 1986), Nigerian table tennis player
- Samuel Edem (fl. from 2005), Nigerian diplomat
- Theresa Edem (born 1986), Nigerian actress and filmmaker

== Given name ==
- Edem Adzaho (fl. from 2012), Ghanaian human resource consultant
- Edem Atovor (born 1994), Ghanaian footballer
- Edem Awumey (born 1975), Togolese-Canadian writer
- Edem Kodjo (1938–1920), Togolese politician
- Edem Mahu (fl. from 2020), Ghanaian marine scientist
- Edem Mortotsi (born 1993), Ghanaian footballer
- Edem Muradosilov (fl. 1980s), Soviet canoeist
- Edem Rjaïbi (born 1994), Tunisian footballer
