= Edem (disambiguation) =

Edem may refer to:

- Edem, an ancient kingdom in Nigeria
- Edem (name), including a list of people with the name
- Edem (rapper) (Denning Edem Hotor, born 1986), Ghanaian musician
