= Toru-Orua =

Community in Bayelsa State, Nigeria

- Town
- Location in Nigeria
- Coordinates: 5.1029°N 6.0666°E
- Country: Nigeria
- State: Bayelsa State
- LGA: Sagbama
- Time zone: UTC+1 (West Africa Time)

Toru-Orua is a community located in Sagbama Local Government Area of Bayelsa State, Nigeria. It is one of the several communities in Bayelsa State. The community is largely an agrarian community surrounded by water. The indigenes of the community primarily engage in fishing and farming. The community is of the Tarakiri Kingdom of the Ijaw nationality located along River Forcados.

== Flooding ==
Given that the community is surrounded by water, it has always suffered from flooding, causing many residents to flee their homes.

== Educational institutions ==
The community is host to the University of Africa, Toru-Orua.

== Notable people ==
- Seriake Dickson

== See also ==
- Bayelsa State
- Opukushi
