= Onyema Ugochukwu =

Nigerian economist

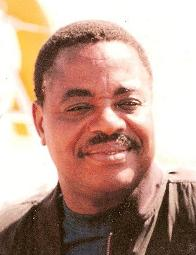
Onyema Ugochukwu

Onyema Ugochukwu // CON (born 9 November 1944) is a Nigerian economist, journalist, and politician. Ugochukwu served as the senior Special Adviser on Communication to Nigerian President Olusegun Obasanjo and the first Executive Chairman of the Niger Delta Development Commission (NDDC). On 25 February 2008, an Abia State elections tribunal declared Ugochukwu the winner of the 2007 gubernatorial election and Governor-elect of Abia State. However, on 11 February 2009 an appeal court in Port Harcourt overturned the ruling, declaring that Theodore Orji of the PPA had in fact won the election.

== Early life ==
Onyema Ugochukwu was born on 9 November 1944 in Ohuhu, Umuahia, Abia State, Nigeria. He graduated from the University of Nigeria, Nsukka, with a BSc in Economics. He is married with four children.

== Biafran War ==
The political turmoil which followed the first military coup in 1966 escalated into a civil war when the south-east region of Nigeria seceded as the Republic of Biafra a year later. Ugochukwu enlisted in the Biafran Army and rose to the rank of captain before the war ended in 1970.

== Career ==
=== Economics ===
Upon graduation from college, Ugochukwu was hired as an Economic Research Assistant by the Central Bank of Nigeria (CBN). He remained with CBN for two years before he abandoned a promising career in economics to pursue his true passion, journalism.

=== Journalism ===
Ugochukwu joined the Business Times group as an Economic Analyst and a pioneer staff of what would later become the most influential financial newspaper in Nigeria. Ugochukwu rose in the ranks to become the Editor of the Business Times newspaper (1977 to 1982). In 1983, Ugochukwu became Editor in Chief of the London-based West Africa magazine, where he wrote extensively on development issues, to provide a better understanding of the African debt crisis. He eventually returned to Nigeria to become the Editor in Chief of the Daily Times of Nigeria and he was subsequently appointed to its board as the Executive Director of Manpower and Development. He retired from newspaper journalism in 1994 as the Executive Director of Publications. Ugochukwu remained active as a media consultant for the Dow Jones Financial News Service. Throughout his distinguished career as a journalist, Ugochukwu has met and interviewed numerous Heads of States – including then British Prime Minister Margaret Thatcher, South African President Nelson Mandela, Jamaican Prime Minister P. J. Patterson, French President Jacques Chirac, Venezuelan President Hugo Chavez, Cuban President, Fidel Castro, Nigerian presidents Ibrahim Babangida, Muhammadu Buhari, Sani Abacha, and Abdusalami Abubakar – and presented papers on African economic and political development at various forums including Oxford University, England, and Uppsala University.

== Politics ==
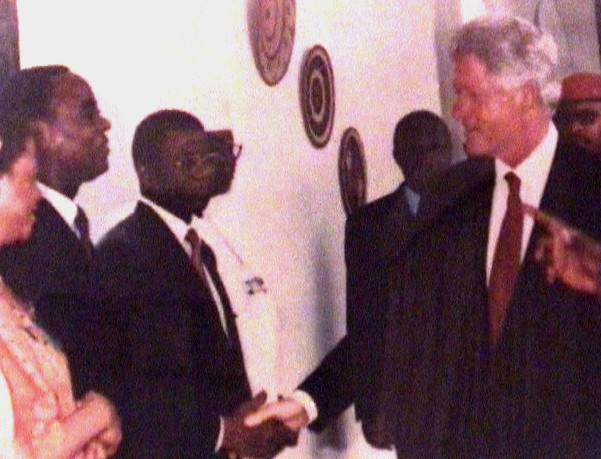
Ugochukwu with United States President, Bill Clinton

With Nigeria's return to democracy in 1998, Ugochukwu became the Director of Publicity at the "Obasanjo for President" Campaign Organisation, and contributed immensely to the election of Olusegun Obasanjo as the President of Nigeria. Ugochukwu was appointed as the Senior Special Assistant to the President on National Orientation and Public Affairs. He spearheaded a "National Rebirth" campaign aimed at instilling patriotic virtues into a national psyche ravaged by years of political instability and corruption. It was on this platform that Ugochukwu launched "The Nigerian Declaration of Human Responsibilities", which declares in part: "This Character on Human Responsibilities… Seeks to bring freedom and responsibility into a better balance, to highlight and increase awareness of the obligation which we owe each other and to our nation."

=== Niger Delta crisis ===
To soothe the political unrest in the oil-rich Niger Delta region of southern Nigeria, President Obasanjo signed the Niger Delta Development Commission (NDDC) act of 2000 into law. Ugochukwu was appointed as the pioneer chairman of the newly created commission, charged with developing the nine oil producing states of the country, with excess oil revenues.

Ugochukwu helped to articulate the president's vision of sustainable development in the Niger Delta region, and developed a policy which encouraged partnership amongst its stakeholders—Niger-delta communities and their tribal chiefs, youth militia, oil companies and their executives, the Nigerian government, and Non-Government Organizations, and international organisations like the United Nations Development Programme (UNDP) and the World Bank. During Ugochukwu's tenure, the NDDC focused mainly on economic revival and prosperity, environmental rehabilitation, and the development of social and physical infrastructure.

=== Campaign for Abia Rebirth (CARE) ===
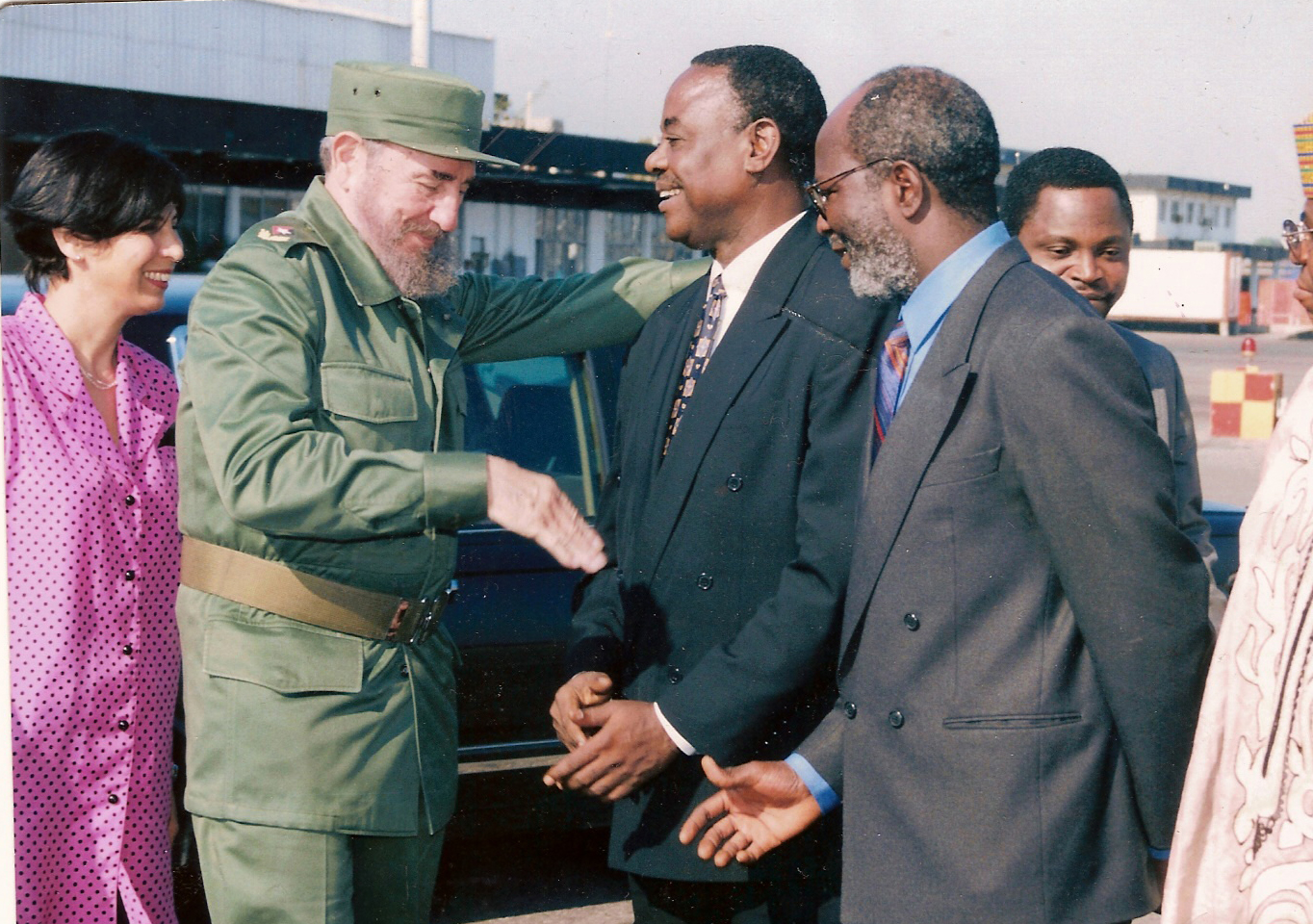
Ugochukwu (center) with Cuban President Fidel Castro, at José Martí International Airport, Havana, Cuba.

At the end of his four-year tenure at NDDC, Ugochukwu returned to Abuja and continued to serve as the President's Special Adviser on Communications. He took an interest in state politics, and resigned from office to join the Abia State gubernatorial race. In 2006, the Campaign for Abia Rebirth (CARE) was launched, with a promise to rebuild the state. On 13 December 2006, Ugochukwu emerged as the People's Democratic Party (PDP) candidate for the 2007 Abia State gubernatorial elections. The hotly contested race was marred by allegations of electoral malpractice, and violence, all of which culminated in the election of Ugochukwu's rival, Theodore Orji of the Progressive Peoples Alliance (PPA).

==== Assassination attempt ====
There was an attempt on Ugochukwu's life during the Abia State Gubernatorial elections on 14 April 2007. The assailants fired shots at his motorcade, fatally wounding one of his State Security Service (SSS) bodyguards, who suffered gunshot wounds through his head and hands. Ugochukwu, the PDP candidate and frontrunner in the election, blamed the attack on his political opponents in the All Nigeria Peoples Party (ANPP) and Progressive Peoples Alliance (PPA).

==== Election Petition Tribunal ====
Ugochukwu sought redress at the Abia State Election Petition Tribunal. Governor Theodore Orji's election was annulled on 25 February 2008, on the grounds that he was ineligible to contest for the office. Orji and his deputy had failed to resign their respective positions in the Abia State government, 30 days prior to the election as stipulated in the 1999 Constitution. The Tribunal also cited Governor Orji's failure to prove beyond a reasonable doubt, his affiliation with a secret cult.

Ugochukwu was thus declared the lawful winner of the April 2007 gubernatorial election, and Governor-elect of Abia State – pending the outcome at the Port Harcourt Appeals Court. However, on 11 February 2009 an appeal court in Port Harcourt overturned the ruling, declaring that Theodore Orji of the PPA had in fact won the election.

== Works ==
- Power and Governance: The Legacy of Dr. Michael Okpara (ISBN 978-027-264-X)

== See also ==
- Niger Delta Development Commission (NDDC)

== Sources ==
- Ugochukwu wins Abia PDP guber primaries
- Campaign for Abia Re-Birth
- Dan Okereke (28 December 2006). "Nigeria 2007 – Ugochukwu Factor in Abia Guber Contest". Daily Champion.
- 2006 Nigerian National Honours conferred on 263 distinguished Nigerians and friends of Nigeria.
- Group commends FG over Ugochukwu’s award (CON)
- Ugochukwu promises industrial parks in Abia
- Ibiso Dakoru (6 August 2001). "NDDC Won't Inherit OMPADEC Contractors – Ugochukwu". ThisDay. Archived from the original on 30 September 2007.
- Why I'm contesting for Abia gov — UGOCHUKWU
- "The environmental challenge of developing the Niger Delta". Alexander's Gas and Oil Connections. 23 December 2003.

Preceded by None	Chairman of the Niger Delta Development Commission (NDDC); 2000–05	Succeeded by Samuel Edem
