= OPL 245 bribery affair =

Corruption scandal over Nigerian oil prospecting licences

Timeline of the OPL 245 bribery affair
Date	Event
29 April 1998	OPL 245 awarded to Malabu Oil & Gas for a US$20 million signature bonus while petroleum minister Dan Etete secretly held a stake.
July 2001	President Olusegun Obasanjo’s administration revokes Malabu’s licence and reassigns the block to Shell, triggering years of litigation.
2006	A settlement briefly returns the block to Malabu, but legal disputes continue among Malabu, Shell and the Nigerian government.
29 April 2011	Three-way agreement: Malabu relinquishes OPL 245; Shell and Eni pay US$1.092 billion plus a US$208 million signature bonus for full rights to the field.
4 May 2011	Funds are deposited in a Nigerian escrow account at JPMorgan in London.
August 2011	US$875 million is released from the escrow account to accounts controlled by Malabu and intermediaries.
2014	Milan prosecutors open an international-corruption investigation into Shell, Eni and executives over the deal.
30 March 2016	The UK Serious Fraud Office confirms cooperation with Italian and Dutch authorities on the OPL 245 probe.
May 2018	Criminal trial begins in Milan against Shell, Eni and 13 individuals for alleged bribery related to OPL 245.
September 2018	Middlemen Emeka Obi and Gianluca Di Nardo receive four-year sentences (later overturned) in a parallel fast-track proceeding.
17 March 2021	Milan Tribunal acquits all defendants, ruling there is “no case to answer.”
24 June 2021	Appeal court quashes the convictions of Obi and Di Nardo for lack of evidence.
14 June 2022	London High Court dismisses Nigeria’s US$1.7 billion negligence claim against JPMorgan over the escrow transfers, citing no breach of the bank’s Quincecare duty.
July 2022	Italian prosecutors drop their appeal; criminal proceedings definitively closed.
11 November 2022	Milan appeals court rejects Nigeria’s US$1.092 billion civil claim against Shell and Eni.
November 2023	Nigeria withdraws its remaining civil actions in Italy; Shell confirms the London civil suit is discontinued; Eni and Nigeria suspend ICSID arbitration to negotiate licence conversion.
March 2024	Federal Capital Territory High Court (Abuja) discharges former attorney-general Mohammed Adoke and others after upholding no-case submissions in EFCC proceedings.
8 May 2024	U.S. Representatives Maxine Waters and Joyce Beatty urge the DOJ to reopen an FCPA investigation into Shell and Eni over OPL 245.
10 October 2024	A Brescia court convicts former Milan prosecutors Fabio De Pasquale and Sergio Spadaro of withholding exculpatory evidence during the OPL 245 trial, giving each an eight-month suspended sentence.

The OPL 245 bribery affair, also known as Malabu oil deal scandal, centres on a 2011 agreement in which Royal Dutch Shell and Italy’s Eni paid US $1.3 billion to acquire Nigeria’s deep-water oil licence OPL 245, a block believed to hold nine billion barrels of crude. Prosecutors and activists alleged that almost US $1.1 billion of the purchase price was channelled through middlemen to politicians and officials, including former petroleum minister Dan Etete, whose company Malabu Oil & Gas had originally been awarded the field. The affair gave rise to criminal trials in Italy, civil suits in the United Kingdom, parallel investigations in Nigeria, the Netherlands and the United States, and has become one of the largest cross-border corruption sagas in the history of the oil industry.

== Background ==
Oil Block 245 is an offshore petroleum field located at depths of approximately 2,000 metres in the southern Niger Delta region of Nigeria. The field has estimated reserves of around 9 billion barrels of oil, accounting for about one-quarter of Nigeria's total proven oil reserves, along with substantial but unspecified quantities of natural gas. Approximately 30% of Nigeria's allocated oil blocks have achieved commercial production.

== History ==
Oil Prospecting Licence 245 was awarded on 29 April 1998 to Malabu Oil & Gas for a US $20 million signature bonus while Etete was petroleum minister under General Sani Abacha. It was later revealed that Etete himself secretly held a major stake in Malabu, effectively giving himself rights to the huge oil field. Malabu paid only $2 million of the $20 million expected for the granting of the lease, and after the end of military rule the subsequent government of President Olusegun Obasanjo revoked the license in July 2001. The block was then assigned to Shell, sparking protracted legal disputes between Shell, Malabu, and the Nigerian government over the rightful ownership.

Shell initially agreed to acquire a 40% stake from Malabu in 2001, but the deal collapsed when the license was revoked. Shell began arbitration over the revocation, while Malabu petition for reinstatement. A 2006 settlement briefly restored the block to Malabu, but the parties remained locked in litigation until the Jonathan administration sought a global resolution in 2010.

On 29 April 2011, the Nigerian government brokered a three-way deal: Malabu relinquished OPL 245 to the state for US $1.092 billion, and Shell and Eni simultaneously paid the same sum to the government (plus a US $208 million signature bonus) in exchange for full rights to the block. In effect, Shell and Eni funded the transfer by paying the federal government, which then was to compensate Malabu. Five days later, the funds were placed in a Nigerian escrow account at JPMorgan in London; by August 2011, $875 million had been released to accounts controlled by Malabu.

Most of the $1.1 billion intended for Nigeria’s treasury was instead diverted as kickbacks to officials and intermediaries. Prosecutors later alleged that then-President Goodluck Jonathan was among those slated to receive a share, an accusation he has denied. Dan Etete, who, as oil minister in 1998, first awarded the block to his own company, emerged as a central figure and chief beneficiary. Etete had been convicted in France in 2007 on unrelated money-laundering charges, yet Shell and Eni executives continued to negotiate with him directly during the OPL 245 deal, fully aware they were dealing with him for the licence. The diverted funds were reportedly used by Etete and his associates to buy private jets, armored vehicles, luxury real estate, and other assets around the world.

Following the 2011 settlement, Shell and Eni each acquired a 50% operating stake in the OPL 245 block. However, due to the emerging corruption allegations and ensuing legal disputes, the companies were never able to develop the field. No oil production has ever occurred on OPL 245, and for years the block remained idle despite its potential value. The Nigerian government, which received only a $210 million official "signature bonus" from the deal, saw none of the $1.1 billion that went to Malabu, prompting public outrage and calls for accountability.

== Investigations and legal action ==
=== Italy ===
The main part of criminal proceedings arising from the OPL 245 scandal took place in Italy. Italian prosecutors in Milan, led by anti-corruption investigator Fabio De Pasquale, investigated Eni and Shell for international corruption, given that Eni’s headquarters and several executives are based in Italy. The Milan probe began around 2014 and culminated in charges being brought in 2017 against a total of 13 individuals and the two companies. Those indicted included Eni's CEO Claudio Descalzi, his predecessor Paolo Scaroni, several Eni executives and intermediaries, as well as Shell’s former head of exploration Malcolm Brinded and two ex-Shell employees who had been British MI6 officers (hired by Shell as advisers) suspected of negotiating with Etete.

The trial in Milan began in May 2018. Prosecutors presented evidence of email communications, financial transactions, and testimonies to show that the 2011 OPL 245 deal was essentially a “handout to thieves” – with $1.1 billion allegedly siphoned to pay off a who’s who of Nigerian power brokers. In a parallel fast-track proceeding in September 2018, two middlemen, Nigerian businessman Emeka Obi and Italian Gianluca Di Nardo, received four-year sentences, together with asset seizures of about US $120 million. An appeal court quashed those convictions in June 2021 for lack of evidence.

After a three-year trial the Milan Tribunal acquitted all defendants on 17 March 2021, finding “no case to answer.” The verdict survived prosecution appeals: in July 2022 criminal proceedings were finally dropped, and on 11 November 2022 the Milan appeals court rejected Nigeria’s US $1.092 billion civil claim. In November 2023, Nigeria told Italy’s Court of Cassation it would withdraw its remaining actions, effectively ending the case there.

In October 2024, a Brescia court convicted former Milan prosecutors Fabio De Pasquale and Sergio Spadaro of withholding exculpatory material during the OPL 245 trial, imposing eight-month suspended sentences and highlighting deep divisions inside the Italian judiciary.

=== United Kingdom ===
The United Kingdom became involved in the OPL 245 saga primarily through its financial system and its cooperation in international investigations. Although the bribe conspiracy was not prosecuted in UK courts as a criminal matter, London played a key role as the venue for related legal actions and as a source of evidence. In particular, the London branch of JPMorgan Chase was the bank that handled the escrow account holding the OPL 245 funds, and it executed the transfer of funds to Malabu in 2011.

Britain's Serious Fraud Office (SFO) worked with Italian and Dutch authorities to assist the OPL 245 investigation.

Nigeria also sued JP Morgan in London for alleged negligence in releasing the US $875 million to Malabu. The case centred on the English common-law “Quincecare duty,” which holds that banks must refuse to execute a customer’s instruction if carrying it out might facilitate a fraud on that customer. JPMorgan, for its part, maintained that its role was simply to follow valid instructions from the Nigerian government’s designated officials, and that it had no authority to second-guess the legitimacy of the deal once it received approval from relevant authorities.

The JPMorgan trial began in London in late February 2022 and lasted about six weeks. The High Court dismissed the US $1.7 billion claim on 14 June 2022, holding that the bank had not breached its duty of care. A separate Commercial Court lawsuit against Shell and Eni was discontinued by Nigeria in November 2023.

=== United States ===
The United States became involved in the OPL 245 matter through investigations by U.S. enforcement agencies, given that both Shell and Eni have significant presence in the U.S. Around 2016–2017, the U.S. Department of Justice (DOJ) and the Securities and Exchange Commission (SEC) opened inquiries into the OPL 245 transaction under the Foreign Corrupt Practices Act, coordinating with their European counterparts. The DOJ and SEC requested information to determine if either company (or their executives) had violated U.S. anti-bribery laws, since some of the alleged conduct or money flows touched U.S. jurisdictions.

However, after reviewing the evidence, U.S. authorities ultimately declined to bring any charges. By 2019, the DOJ had quietly closed its investigation without filing an indictment, and the SEC likewise decided not to pursue civil enforcement.

On 8 May 2024, U.S. Representatives Maxine Waters and Joyce Beatty urged the Department of Justice to reopen a Foreign Corrupt Practices Act investigation into Shell and Eni, arguing that the Italian acquittals left substantial evidence of bribery untested and cost Nigeria an estimated US $6 billion in future revenue.

=== Nigeria ===
In Nigeria, the OPL 245 transaction sparked parliamentary inquiries and law-enforcement investigations amid accusations that it was not conducted in the country’s best interest. In 2014, the Nigerian House of Representatives voted to cancel the OPL 245 deal, declaring it illegal and “contrary to the laws of Nigeria”.

The Economic and Financial Crimes Commission (EFCC) and other Nigerian authorities opened criminal cases against key officials involved in the deal. In 2017, the EFCC charged former petroleum minister Dan Etete (Malabu’s owner) and former attorney-general Mohammed Adoke with offences including money laundering and corruption related to OPL 245. Nigerian prosecutors alleged that these officials corruptly orchestrated the 2011 agreement for personal gain. In April 2019, a Nigerian court issued arrest warrants for Etete, Adoke, and a former Minister of Finance (allegedly involved as well), preparatory to formal charges. Etete remained a fugitive abroad, but Adoke was detained; he was arrested in late 2019 in Dubai and extradited to Nigeria to stand trial. His trial (alongside other Nigerian defendants such as businessman Aliyu Abubakar, who was implicated as a recipient of Malabu funds) proceeded in Nigeria’s courts. As of 2022, those proceedings were ongoing, with some defendants claiming they were pressured to falsely implicate higher officials.

The EFCC filed 40-count charges in 2020 against Adoke, Etete, Malabu, and the Nigerian subsidiaries of Shell and Eni. In March 2024, the Federal Capital Territory High Court upheld no-case submissions and discharged all defendants, criticising the prosecution’s evidence.

=== Netherlands ===
In February 2016, Dutch financial police, the FIOD, and prosecutors, in coordination with Italy, conducted a search at Shell’s headquarters in The Hague, seizing documents and communications related to the OPL 245 deal.

By March 2019, the Dutch Public Prosecutor's Office signalled that it was preparing to file criminal charges against Shell over OPL 245. Shell later disclosed in its filings that it was a subject of the Dutch bribery probe stemming from OPL 245.

The Dutch case progressed slowly and largely behind closed doors. Officials coordinated closely with the Italian trial rather than pressing forward independently, perhaps waiting to see the outcome in Milan. Following the acquittal of Shell and its executives in Italy in 2021 (upheld in 2022), the trajectory of the Dutch investigation became uncertain. As of 2025, there has been no public report of a Dutch trial or resolution of charges against Shell regarding OPL 245.

=== Other proceedings ===
Eni also initiated investment-treaty arbitration against Nigeria at the World Bank’s ICSID; the parties mutually suspended the case in November 2023 to negotiate conversion of the prospecting licence to a mining lease.
