= Samuel Edem =

Nigerian diplomat

Samuel Edem was a former Nigerian ambassador and a former chairman of the Niger Delta Development Commission (NDDC). He hails from Ndiya, Nsit-Ubium, Akwa Ibom State in southern Nigeria.

Preceded by Onyema Ugochukwu	Chairman of Niger Delta Development Commission (NDDC); 2005–present	Succeeded by incumbent
