= Chiedu Ebie =

Nigerian politician

Chairman of the Governing Board Niger Delta Development Commission
- Incumbent
- Assumed office November 2023

Personal details
- Born: 2 January 1970 (age 56) Ibadan, Oyo State, Nigeria
- Education: University of Benin (Nigeria) University of London
- Occupation: Lawyer; Entrepreneur; Politician

Chiedu John Ebie (born 2 January 1970) is a Nigerian politician, lawyer, oil and gas consultant, and public servant. He has held roles in both the public and private sectors.

== Early life and education ==
Ebie was born in Ibadan, Oyo State, Nigeria, to Professor John C. Ebie and Mrs. Eunice Ebie. He spent his early years in Benin City, Edo State.

He completed his secondary education at Air Force Military School, Jos. In 1991, he earned a Bachelor of Laws degree from the University of Benin and was called to the Nigerian Bar in 1992. He later pursued further studies, obtaining a Postgraduate Diploma in Law from the University of London in 2012.

== Career ==
Ebie served as commissioner for basic and secondary education in Delta State from 2015 to 2019, implementing reforms in teacher development, curriculum updates, and education policy. From 2019 to 2021, he was secretary to the Delta State Government under Governor Ifeanyi Okowa, coordinating state operations and chairing committees on flood risk management and the COVID-19 response.

In 2023, he was appointed chairman of the Governing Board of the Niger Delta Development Commission (NDDC) by President Bola Ahmed Tinubu, tasked with supervising developmental projects and initiatives in the Niger Delta region.

Ebie’s private-sector experience includes roles in legal practice and consulting. He was a partner at Punuka Attorneys & Solicitors. As Managing Partner at Cranston Pitt Oil & Gas Consultancy, he focused on delivering strategic solutions to challenges in the oil and gas sector.

== Legal challenges ==
Following his appointment as chairman of the NDDC, a group of Niger Delta residents filed a lawsuit alleging violations of the NDDC Act. The Federal High Court in Abuja dismissed the case, ruling in favor of the respondents, including Ebie and the Nigerian government.
