= Eniwari =

Eniwari is a community located in Southern Ijaw Local Government Area in Bayelsa State, Nigeria.

Izon dialect is the language spoken by the people in the community.
