= Ondewari =

Community in Southern Ijaw

Coordinates: 4°46′21″N 6°00′30″E

Ondewari is a community located in Southern Ijaw Local Government Area in Bayelsa State, Nigeria. It is a coastal line community and houses the Nigerian Agip Oil Company. The community has records of oil spillage which has affected lives and properties in recent times.
