= Postal codes in Nigeria =

Postal codes in Nigeria are issued by the Nigerian Postal Service (NIPOST). A six-digit numeric system was replaced on 1 October 2026 by the National Digital Alphanumeric Postcode System (NDAPS), which gives each building an 11-character code.

== Six-digit system ==
The earlier postal codes were numeric, consisting of six digits. NIPOST divided the country into nine regions, which made up the first digit of the code. The second and third digits, combined with the first, were the dispatch district for outgoing sorting. The last three digits represented the delivery location. A delivery location could be any of the following; a post office facility, a rural area, or an urban area.

The main postal head office in each region had a postal code ending in 0001, so Garki Main HO in Abuja had the postal code 900001, Ikeja HO in Lagos had 100001, Lokoja in Kogi had 270001 and Port Harcourt had 500001. The lowest postcode was 100001 and the highest was 982002. In addition there were some postal code for some states in Nigeria, as Enugu's postal code was 400001, while Imo state's was 460001.

== National Digital Alphanumeric Postcode System ==
On 1 October 2026, the Nigerian Postal Service launched the National Digital Alphanumeric Postcode System. It gives each building an 11-character alphanumeric code, such as FC 02 A09 DB 09. A code identifies a location at five levels: state, local government area, district, area, and building. The system replaces the six-digit numeric postcodes.

== See also ==
- Lists of villages in Nigeria
- Nigerian Postal Service
