= Olugbobiri =

Olugbobiri is a community located in Southern Ijaw Local Government Area in Bayelsa State, Nigeria.

It is a riverine community and one of the communities affected by flood disaster in Bayelsa State.

== Climate ==
March has the highest temperatures in Olugbobiri.
