= Aleibiri =

Aleibiri Town is a village located in Bayelsa State's Ekeremor Local Government Area beside Bolou Toru Creek.The main attributes of the Aleibiri people are their aptitude for football, politics, fishing, farming, wrestling, and education. Her neighbors also saw the town as a commercial and industrial center. People travel from near and far to Aleibiri in order to buy and trade.

Report has it that Prominent grassroots female politicians from Aleibiri Kingdom of Ekeremor Wards 2 and 3 announced their support for Chief Henry Seriake Dickson, the former governor of the state and senatorial candidate for the Peoples Democratic Party, on Thursday. Chief Peremobowei Ebebi, the All Progressives Congress senatorial candidate, was born and raised in Aleibiri, where the women were visiting from.

== Schools in Aleibiri ==
There are various schools in Aleibiri community such as:

- The Bayelsa State Polytechnic is situated at Aleibiri town of Bolou Toru Creek in Ekeremor Local Government Area, with a distance of approximately 51 km from Yenagoa, the Capital City. The Polytechnic is geographically located on Longitude 4.946 N and Latitude 5.684 E. The Polytechnic situated in Aleibiri Town can be accessed from Yenagoa through the Sagbama/Toru-Orua Road, and from Delta State through Bomadi Road.
- Community Secondary School, Aleibiri.
