= List of villages in Nigeria =

Villages in Nigeria

Lists of villages in Nigeria organised by state:

- List of villages in the Federal Capital Territory, Nigeria
- List of villages in Abia State
- List of villages in Adamawa State
- List of villages in Akwa Ibom State
- List of villages in Anambra State
- List of villages in Bauchi State
- List of villages in Bayelsa State
- List of villages in Benue State
- List of villages in Borno State
- List of villages in Cross River State
- List of villages in Delta State
- List of villages in Ebonyi State
- List of villages in Edo State
- List of villages in Ekiti State
- List of villages in Enugu State
- List of villages in Gombe State
- List of villages in Imo State
- List of villages in Jigawa State
- List of villages in Kaduna State
- List of villages in Kano State
- List of villages in Katsina State
- List of villages in Kebbi State
- List of villages in Kogi State
- List of villages in Kwara State
- List of villages in Lagos State
- List of villages in Nasarawa State
- List of villages in Niger State
- List of villages in Ogun State
- List of villages in Ondo State
- List of villages in Osun State
- List of villages in Oyo State
- List of villages in Plateau State
- List of villages in Rivers State
- List of villages in Sokoto State
- List of villages in Taraba State
- List of villages in Yobe State
- List of villages in Zamfara State
