= Aiegbe =

Town in Bayelsa State, Nigeria

Aiegbe is a town located in Ekeremor, Bayelsa State, Nigeria with the postal code 561102.
