= Aliebiri =

Aliebiri is a community located in Ekeremor Local Government Area in Bayelsa State, Nigeria.

It is one of the communities affected by yearly floods in Bayelsa State.

The community is home to the Bayelsa State Polytechnic.
