= Kemebradikumo Pondei =

Acting managing director of NDDC

Acting Managing Director of Niger Delta Development Commission
- Acting
- In office 19 February 2020 – 12 December 2020
- Preceded by: Joi Nunieh
- Succeeded by: Effiong Okon Akwa

Personal details
- Education: University of Lagos; University of Nottingham

Kemebradikumo Daniel Pondei is a Nigerian professor and the former acting managing director of Niger Delta Development Commission. He was appointed by the President of Nigeria, Muhammadu Buhari on 19 February 2020.

== Early life and education ==
Pondei is from Bayelsa State, Nigeria. He attended Federal Government College, Port Harcourt for his secondary education. He studied medicine and surgery at University of Lagos before going to University of Nottingham where he got his doctorate degree in Microbiology.

== Career ==
Pondei started his career in 2001 as a lecturer. He later served as the acting head of department of medical microbiology and parasitology and acting dean of faculty of basic medical sciences at College of Health Sciences, Niger Delta University. He served as the chairman of the Nigerian Medical Association, Bayelsa State. Later in his career, he became a professor of medical microbiology and served as the provost of College of Health Sciences, Niger Delta University.

== Acting managing director of NDDC ==
On 19 February 2020, the President of Nigeria, Muhammadu Buhari appointed Pondei as the acting managing director of Niger Delta Development Commission to replace Joi Nunieh.

=== Corruption scandal ===
On 20 July 2020, Pondei slumped while being questioned by a probing panel in the House of Representatives over an alleged abuse of ₦81.5bn between October 2019 to 31 May 2020.

On 13 December 2020, Pondei was removed from his position and replaced with after an restraining order was issued against the interim management committee of the organisation was approved.
