= Edem Adzaho =

Ghanaian writer

Edem Adzaho is a trainer, author, public speaker and Ghanaian human resource consultant. She was voted 17th on the 2015 Most Influential Young Ghanaian list.

== Career ==
Edem consults for the British Council in Ghana. She has held positions such as Intercultural Fluency Master Trainer, External Consultant and has served on the assessment board for selecting Ghanaians for the Tullow Group Scholarship Scheme which was facilitated by the British Council since 2012 until it was ended in 2016. Tullow Oil's flagship scheme was dedicated to giving young Ghanaians the opportunity to benefit from the country's recently discovered oil resources. She is an external facilitator for the University of Ghana Business School's Centre for Management and Professional Development. She has written two books: Your Degree Will Never Be Enough and The Global Graduates. She was a speaker for TEDxAccra in 2016. Edem is the Founder and Lead Trainer at The Global Graduate Academy. She is also the CEO of SPEC Consult Limited, an award-winning HR and Training Consultancy focusing on coaching and training young professionals, senior executives and companies who are keen to be globally competitive for nearly a decade. Edem is also a writer, an educator and a traveller and has experienced 42 countries so far.

== Awards ==
- Human Capacity Development 2014 award by SME Ghana
- Listed on Most Influential Young Ghanaian 2015 list
