= Edem Mahu =

Ghanaian Marine Biogeoscientist

- Born: Ghana
- Education: University of Ghana
- Scientific career
- Workplaces: San Jose State University; University of Ghana

Edem Mahu is a Ghanaian marine scientist who is an associate professor at the University of Ghana. Her research considers ocean health, oyster fisheries and climate change. She was awarded the 2022 American Geophysical Union Africa Award for Research Excellence in Ocean Sciences.

== Early life and education ==
Mahu applied to study medicine at university, but decided to move into oceanography and fisheries. She earned her doctorate in oceanography at the University of Ghana. Upon receiving the 2022 American Geophysical Union Africa Award for Research Excellence in Ocean Sciences, Mahu reflected on her choice of careers:

I must confess that the decision to pursue a career in ocean sciences in West Africa was intrepid. The most rewarding aspect of this journey has been my ability to serve our global community, mentor several young scientists, and facilitate the development of ocean science capacity in Africa, while at the same time striving to develop my research as a young woman scientist.

Her research made use of radioisotopes in reconstructing the pollution history of heavy metals in the shores of the Gulf of Guinea. She analyzed sediment cores and built a database that described trace metal distribution and toxicity. During her doctoral research, she completed two research placements in the San Jose State University, where she worked at the Moss Landing Marine Laboratories. After earning her doctorate, Mahu became the first marine biogeochemist in Ghana.

== Research and career ==
Mahu started working on an Organization for Women in Science for the Developing World project to develop cheap android coupled soil nutrient test kits for Ghanaian farmlands. Mahu works on an International Foundation for Science project that looks to understand the toxicity of heavy metal pollution in Ghana. She is a member of "Employment of female researchers in Key Assignments" (ERIKA), part of the Partnership for Observation of the Global Oceans (POGO) forum that looks to improve the representation of women in marine research. She is trustee of the Partnership for Observation of the Global Ocean.

Mahu's research seeks to improve ocean health through restoring declining oyster population in Ghana.

== Awards and honors ==
- 2020 Affiliate of the African Academy of Sciences
- 2020 Royal Society Future Leaders – African Independent Research (FLAIR) fellowship
- 2021 National Geographic Society Emerging Explorer Award
- 2022 American Geophysical Union Africa Award for Research Excellence in Ocean Sciences

== Selected publications ==
- Stella Aseye Adika; Edem Mahu; Richard Crane; et al. (2020). "Microplastic ingestion by pelagic and demersal fish species from the Eastern Central Atlantic Ocean, off the Coast of Ghana". Marine Pollution Bulletin. 153 110998. doi:10.1016/j.marpolbul.2020.110998. PMID 32275547. Wikidata Q91804697.
- Edem Mahu; Elvis Nyarko; Samuel Hulme; Kenneth H Coale; Mahu, E.; Nyarko, E.; Hulme, S.; Coale, K.H. (2015). "Distribution and enrichment of trace metals in marine sediments from the Eastern Equatorial Atlantic, off the Coast of Ghana in the Gulf of Guinea". Marine Pollution Bulletin. 98 (1–2): 301–307. doi:10.1016/j.marpolbul.2015.06.044. PMID 26139460. Wikidata Q53091008.
- Chico-Ortiz, Nicole; Mahu, Edem; Crane, Rich; Gordon, Chris; Marchant, Rob (November 2020). "Microplastics in Ghanaian coastal lagoon sediments: Their occurrence and spatial distribution". Regional Studies in Marine Science. 40 101509. Bibcode:2020RSMS...4001509C. doi:10.1016/j.rsma.2020.101509. hdl:10871/123278. ISSN 2352-4855. S2CID 225107193.
