= Ogobiri =

Town in Bayelsa State, Nigeria

Ogobiri is a community located in Sagbama Local Government Area in Bayelsa State, Nigeria.
