= Opukushi =

Village in Bayelsa State, Nigeria

Coordinates: 4°54′36″N 5°46′26″E

Opukushi is a village located in Ekeremor Local Government Area, Bayelsa State, Nigeria. Opukushi is one of the oil producing communities in Nigeria and it has an oil field named "Opukushi oil field" which is controlled by Shell Petroleum. In 2022, Premium Times reported that Opukushi natives had interfered with oil development at a Shell Petroleum Development Company (SPDC) oilfield onshore.
