= Oporoma =

Oporoma is a community located in Southern Ijaw Local Government Area in Bayelsa State, Nigeria.

== Climate ==
In Oporoma, the wet season is mostly warm and overcast, the dry season is hot and mostly overcast, and it is oppressive year round. Over the course of the year, the temperature typically varies from 72 °F to 86 °F and is rarely below 65 °F or above 89 °F.
