= Federal Polytechnic, Ekowe =

Coordinates: 4.7093°N 6.0913°E

- Type: Public
- Established: 2009
- Rector: Dr. Agbabiaka Adegoke L.
- Location: Ekowe, Bayelsa State, Nigeria
- Website: Official website

The Federal Polytechnic, Ekowe is a federal government higher education institution located in Ekowe, Bayelsa State, Nigeria. The current substantive Rector is Dr. Agbabiaka Adegoke L. The Polytechnic offer programmes in different fields of human knowledge, including Social Sciences, Basic Sciences and Agricultural Sciences. The institution award National Diploma (ND) and Higher National Diploma (HND) certificates.

== History ==
The Federal Polytechnic, Ekowe was established in 2009.

== Courses ==
The institution offers the following courses:

- Statistics
- Computer Science
- Local Government Studies
- Accountancy
- Electrical/Electronic Engineering Technology
- Business Administration and Management
- Science Laboratory Technology
- Public Administration
