= Ogboloma =

Town in Bayelsa State, Nigeria

Coordinates: 5°03′03″N 6°19′57″E

Ogboloma is a community located in Yenagoa Local Government Area, It is part of the Gbarin Clan alongside communities including Okolobri, Polacu, Nedugo Agbia, and Tombia Village. It is an Oil producing region in Bayelsa State, Nigeria..
