= Dan Etete =

Nigerian politician

Federal Minister of Petroleum
- In office 1995–1998

Personal details
- Born: 25 January 1945 (age 81)

Dan Etete (born 26 January 1945) aka Chief Dauzia Loya Etete, was the former Nigerian Minister of Petroleum (1995–1998), under the regime of Gen. Sani Abacha's 1995 and was convicted as a money-launderer in the year 2007.

== Biography ==
Dan Etete, was found guilty of money laundering by a French court in 2007. He was also found to have used illicit funds to buy a speedboat and a chateau. Since then, Dan Etete has been involved in series of illegal and fraudulent business practices both local and abroad. In the year 2007, he was convicted and sentenced to 3 years imprisonment also with a fine of 300,000 euros(about $440,000) by the French Government for money laundering. Later on he was pardoned by the French government in the year 2014, Dan Etete's illegal involvement or activities did not stop there but continued as he was said to have been involved in helping to facilitate the illegal transfer $1.3 billion for the sale of the oil block owned by Malabu Company from Shell and Eni and transferred to the company during the former Nigerian President Goodluck Jonathan's administration, who was also claimed to be involved in the fraudulent deal in 2011.

== Corruption ==
In 2011, as a former Minister of Petroleum under military dictator General Sani Abacha, Dan Etete facilitated the transfer of payment of $1.1 billion to Malabu Oil and Gas. Malabu was set up in 1998 by Dan Etete using a false identity so as to award himself a lucrative oil block, OPL 245, for which he paid only $2 million of the $20 million legally required by the state.

At the time of Goodluck Jonathan's government, Dan Etete was said to have helped facilitate the transfer of payment from Shell and Eni to Malabu Oil and Gas. The Economist reports that only $800 million out of the $1.1 billion meant for Malabu Oil and Gas was ever remitted by the Nigerian government. The Nigerian Attorney General, Mohammed Bello Adoke, who signed the documents involved in facilitating the payments, denied the rest was shared by public officials. The transfer to convicted felon, Dan Etete, only came to public light when a Russian lawyer that claimed to have helped Malabu negotiate a deal with the Jonathan's government sued in New York for a $66 million unpaid commission.

Both Shell and Eni, as of September 2014, are under investigation for corruption by the UK and Italy authorities for the incidence.

In 2017, e-mails obtained by anti-corruption charities Global Witness and Finance Uncovered apparently revealed that Shell's executives were negotiating directly with Dan Etete for a year before the oil deal that corruptly enriched Dan Etete was finalised.
