= Southern Ijaw =

Southern Ijaw SILGA
- LGA
- Interactive map of Southern Ijaw
- Location in Nigeria
- Coordinates: 4°42′N 5°58′E
- Country: Nigeria
- State: Bayelsa State
- Headquarters: Oporoma (Osokoma)

Government
  - Local Government Chairman: Lucky Okodeh (PDP)

Area
  - Total: 2,682 km^{2} (1,036 sq mi)

Population (2024 est)
  - Total: 572,732
  - Density: 213.5/km^{2} (553.1/sq mi)
- Time zone: UTC+1 (WAT)
- 3-digit postal code prefix: 560
- ISO 3166 code: NG.BY.SI

Southern Ijaw is a Local Government Area of Bayelsa State, Southern part of Nigeria. Its headquarters are in the town of Oporoma (or Osokoma) in the north of the area at 4°48′17″N 6°04′44″E. The area has a coastline of approximately 60 km on the Bight of Benin.

The people and their language are known as Izon. The LGA also has a wide practice of religion such as Traditionalism and Christianity.

It has institutions like the Niger Delta University (NDU), the Bayelsa state airport in Wilberforce Island and Federal Polytechnic, Ekowe. It is the home of Kolu United FC of Koluama II.

The first democratically elected governor, Chief Diepreye Alamieyeseigha (DSP) hailed from the area.

It has an area of 2,682 km^{2} and an estimated population of 572,732 as of 2024.

The postal code of the area is 560. The local government is made up of several towns and villages which include Igbomotoro, Peremabiri, Opuama, Eniwari, Angiama, Diebu, Ondewari, and Aziama.
