= Niger Delta Development Commission =

Nigerian federal government agency

- Formation: June 5, 2000
- Headquarters: Port Harcourt, Rivers State, Nigeria
- Chairman: Chiedu Ebie
- Managing Director: Chief Dr. Samuel Ogbuku
- Website: nddc.gov.ng

The Niger Delta Development Commission (NDDC) is a federal government agency established by former Nigerian president Olusegun Obasanjo in the year 2000, with the sole mandate of developing the oil-rich Niger Delta region of Nigeria. In September 2008, President Umaru Yar'Adua announced the formation of a Niger Delta Ministry, with the Niger Delta Development Commission to become a parastatal under the ministry. One of the core mandates of the commission is to train and educate the youths of the oil rich Niger Delta regions to curb hostilities and militancy, while developing key infrastructure to promote economic diversification and productivity.

== Background ==
The NDDC was created largely as a response to the demands of the population of the Niger Delta, a populous area inhabited by a diversity of minority ethnic groups. During the 1990s, these ethnic groups, most notably the Ijaw and the Ogoni established organisations to confront the Nigerian government and multinational oil companies such as Shell. The minorities of the Niger Delta have continued to agitate and articulate demands for greater autonomy and control of the area's petroleum resources. They justify their grievances by reference to the extensive environmental degradation and pollution from oil activities that have occurred in the region since the late 1950s. However, the minority communities of oil producing areas have received little or no currency from the oil industry and environmental remediation measures are limited and negligible. The region is highly underdeveloped and is poor even by Nigeria's standards for quality of life.

Sometimes violent confrontation with the state and oil companies, as well as with other communities has constrained oil production as disaffected youth or organisations deliberately disrupt oil operations in attempts to effect change. These disruptions have been extremely costly to the Nigerian oil industry, and both the multinationals and the federal government have vested interests in permitting uninterrupted extraction operations; the NDDC is a result of these concerns and is an attempt to satisfy the demands of the delta's population.

== Mandate and operations ==
The NDDC mandate:

- Formulation of policies and guidelines for the development of the Niger Delta area.
- Conception, planning and implementation, in accordance with set rules and regulations, of projects and programs for sustainable development of the Niger Delta area in the field of transportation including roads, jetties and waterways, health, employment, industrialization, agriculture and fisheries, housing and urban development, water supply, electricity and telecommunications.
- Surveying the Niger Delta in order to ascertain measures necessary to promote its physical and socio-economic development.
- Preparing master plans and schemes designed to promote the physical development of the Niger Delta region and the estimation of the member states of the commission.
- Implementation of all the measures approved for the development of the Niger Delta region by the Federal Government and the states of the commission.
- Identify factors inhibiting the development of the Niger Delta region and assisting the member states in the formulation and implementation of policies to ensure sound and efficient management of the resources of the Niger Delta region.
- Assessing and reporting on any project being funded or carried out in the region by oil and gas companies and any other company, including non-governmental organizations, as well as ensuring that funds released for such projects are properly utilized.
- Tackling ecological and environmental problems that arise from the exploration of oil mineral in the Niger Delta region and advising the Federal Government and the member states on the prevention and control of oil spillages, gas flaring and environmental pollution.
- Liaising with the various oil mineral and gas prospecting and producing companies on all matters of pollution, prevention and control.
- Executing such other works and performing such other functions, which in the option of the commission are required for the sustainable development of the Niger Delta region and its people

== Abandoned or incomplete projects & programmes ==
By 2021, more than 13,000 projects and programmes by NDDC have either been abandoned or are uncompleted. The agency is said to have received ₦6tr between 1999 and 2021. 953 of the abandoned projects are sited in Rivers State. President Mohammed Buhari had ordered a forensic audit NDDC from 2001 to 2019. This led to termination of contracts of which there had been no activities on the contract site.

=== Fiber Optics/Telecoms and Oil Spill ===
In 2015, the NDDC started a three months twin certification programme in December 2015, running into billions of naira that was abandoned two months into the training - The Fiber Optics/Telecoms (Owerri) and Oil Spill Management (Port Harcourt) Training for youths of the Niger Delta region. The two programmes were abandoned by the NDDC and its contractors Mr. Alex Duke (CEO of GreenData Limited). GreenData abandoned the 200 trainees in various hotels in Owerri. This is 2019, and the programmes are still not completed. The Presidency, the NDDC nor its contractor Mr. Alex Duke have said when the training will resume. This and other issues have led the current board of the commission to cancel some contracts. This is not the first time contracts worth billions of naira have been abandoned and monies going into private pockets, which has brought the NDDC into the watchful eyes of the Presidency. One of the core mandates of the commission is to train and educate the youths of the oil rich Niger Delta regions to curb hostilities and also to reduce poverty.

=== Deferred by pandemic ===
In the year 2020 the NDDC Executive Management mandated G2TEL Consortium (George Oruma) a freelance Environmentalist/Engineering personnel to assist the organization in the area of developing and procurement of Garbage/Waste Trucks for the use and sanitizing the states of Niger Delta Development Commission. Due to pandemic disaster and situations affecting operations all over the world, the projects has been postponed to 2021. The sum of $65M has been budgeted for the entire project, including maintenance.

== Executive Chairman ==
The position of Executive Chairman of the NDDC has been a subject of much debate. A compromise was reached where the position would be rotated within the nine oil producing states in alphabetical order: Abia, Akwa Ibom, Bayelsa, Cross River, Delta, Edo, Imo, Ondo and Rivers.

Name	Post	Term of Service
Chiedu Ebie	Chairman of the Governing Board	2023–Present
Sen. Victor Ndoma-Egba	Chairman of the Governing Board	2016
Engr. Dr. Emmanuel Audu-Ohwavborua	Acting Managing Director/CEO	2022
Mr. Mene Derek	Executive Director (Finance and Admin)	2016
Engr. Adjogbe Samuel	Executive Director, Project	2016
Chief Dr. Samuel Ogbuku	Managing Director	2023-Present
Laureta Onochie	Chairman of the Governing Board	2023

=== Sole administrators ===
- Effiong Akwa, 2020-2022

However, On December 12, 2020, President Buhari named as sole administrator, Effiong Akwa, a lawyer and accountant, former Special Assistant, Finance at the NDDC, and former Acting Executive Director, Finance.

On the 20th of October 2022, The President appointed a new Acting Managing Director, Engr Emmanuel Audu-Ohwavborua, for the Niger Delta Development Commission.
