= Bayelsa State =

State of Nigeria

Coordinates: 4°45′N 6°05′E

Bayelsa
- State
- Bayelsa State Government of Nigeria
- Flag
- Nicknames: "Glory of all lands"
- Motto: Truth, Service and Justice
- Location of Bayelsa State in Nigeria
- Country: Nigeria
- LGAs: 8
- Geopolitical Zone: South South
- Created: 1 October 1996
- Capital: Yenagoa

Government
  - Body: Executive Council of Bayelsa State
  - Governor: Douye Diri (APC)
  - Deputy Governor: Peter Akpe
  - Legislature: Bayelsa State House of Assembly
  - Senators: C: Moses Cleopas (PDP); E : Benson Sunday Agadaga (PDP); W: Henry Seriake Dickson (PDP)
  - Representatives: List

Area
  - Total: 10,773 km^{2} (4,159 sq mi)
  - Rank: 27th

Population
  - Estimate (2024): 3,724,225
- Ranked 36th
- Demonym: Bayelsan

GDP (PPP)
  - Year: 2021
  - Total: $29.97 billion 9th of 36
  - Per capita: $11,379; 2nd of 36
- Postal/Zip Code: 560001
- ISO 3166 code: NG-BY
- HDI (2022): 0.573 medium · 20th of 37
- Website: bayelsastate.gov.ng

Bayelsa is a state in the South South region of Nigeria, located in the core of the Niger Delta. Bayelsa State was created in 1996 and was carved out from Rivers State, making it one of the newest states in the federation. The capital, Yenagoa, is susceptible to high risk of annual flooding. It shares a boundary with Rivers State to the east and Delta State to the north across the Niger River for 17 km and the Forçados River for 198 km, with the waters of the Atlantic Ocean dominating its southern borders. It has a total area of 10,773 square kilometres (4,159 sq mi). The state comprises eight local government areas: Ekeremor, Kolokuma/Opokuma, Yenagoa, Nembe, Ogbia, Sagbama, Brass and Southern Ijaw. Bayelsa state is regarded as the least populous state in Nigeria with an estimated population of over 3,700,000 as of 2024. Being in the Niger Delta, Bayelsa State has a riverine and estuarine setting, with bodies of water within the state making the development of significant road infrastructure, quite difficult.

The state is the primary and ancestral home of the Ijaw people, from where migration took place to other Ijaw settlements. The languages spoken are Ijaw, Ogbia, Nembe, Epie, . The state is just the ancestral home of the larger Ijaws also in the Sagbama local government area.

As a state in the oil-rich Niger Delta, Bayelsa State's economy is dominated by the petroleum industry. The state is the site of Oloibiri Oilfield, where oil was first discovered in Nigeria, and as of 2015 the state was estimated to produce 30-40% of the country's oil. The state has the largest gas reservoir (18 trillion cubic feet) in Nigeria. Though it is the site of one of the largest crude oil and natural gas deposits in the country contributes to local economic development, the state remains plagued by rampant poverty as well as pollution stemming from oil spills.

== History ==
During the 20th century, demanding a new, majority-Ijaw state to be drawn in the Niger Delta Region became common. Between 1941 and 1956, numerous Ijaw nationalist organizations supportive of an Ijaw-majority state in Southern Nigeria were founded. Isaac Adaka Boro, a prominent Ijaw rights activist during the 1960s who was born in Oloibiri, attempted to proclaim a "Niger Delta Peoples Republic" in 1966. Bayelsa State was created out of Rivers State on 1 October 1996 by the Sani Abacha military government. Its name was derived from the first few letters of the names of the major local government areas from which it was formed: Brass LGA (BALGA), Yenagoa LGA (YELGA) and Sagbama LGA (SALGA).

On 20 November 1999, the Nigerian military committed what is now referred to as the Odi massacre. The death toll remains disputed to this day, though Nnimmo Bassey, executive director of Environmental Rights Action, claims that nearly 2500 civilians were killed.

In response to environmental degradation in the state caused by the oil industry, movements such as the "Rise for Bayelsa" campaign have emerged to push for protecting the local water supply. In 2019, the Bayelsa State government launched the first formal inquiry into the crisis of oil pollution in the state.

== Economy ==
Bayelsa State has one of the largest crude oil and natural gas deposits in Nigeria. As a result, petroleum production is substantial in the state. Even though Bayelsa State is well-endowed with natural resources, the state "enjoys very minimal dividends from its oil wealth due to the structural inequities in the national revenue allocation system in the practice of fiscal federalism in the country".

== Geography ==
Bayelsa has a riverine and estuarine setting. Many communities are almost (and in some cases) surrounded by water, making them inaccessible by road. The state is home to the Edumanom Forest Reserve, in June 2008 the last known site for chimpanzees in the Niger Delta.

Other important cities besides Yenagoa include Akassa, Lobia, Wilberforce Island (the location of the Bayelsa Airport), Amassoma and Ogobiri (the host communities of the Niger Delta University (NDU), Eniwari, Ekeremor, Aliebiri, Anyama-Ogbia, Anyama-Ijaw, Peretoru, Twon-Brass, Egwema-Brass, Kaiama, Nembe, Odi, Ogbia, Okpoama, Brass, Oporoma, Korokorosei, Otuan, Koroama, Okolobiri, Obunagha, Ogboloma, Sagbama, Olugbobiri, Peremabiri, Ekowe, and Swali.

The Akassa Lighthouse has stood since 1910.

=== Climate ===
Bayelsa has a tropical monsoon climate with yearly temperature of 28.64 °C or 83.55 °F, which is 0.82 percent lower than Nigeria's averages. The state typically receives about 2,900 millimetres or 114 inches of rain and has 296.16 rainy days (81.14% of the time) annually.

The Bayelsa region experiences tropical monsoon weather. All year long, there are high temperatures and a lot of rain. The average humidity is 82% and the UV-index is 6.

Climate data for Bayelsa State
Month	Jan	Feb	Mar	Apr	May	Jun	Jul	Aug	Sep	Oct	Nov	Dec	Year
Record high °C (°F)	40.0 (104.0)	42.0 (107.6)	39.0 (102.2)	39.0 (102.2)	38.0 (100.4)	36.0 (96.8)	32.0 (89.6)	32.0 (89.6)	34.0 (93.2)	34.0 (93.2)	36.0 (96.8)	39.0 (102.2)	42.0 (107.6)
Mean daily maximum °C (°F)	35.69 (96.24)	34.42 (93.96)	33.5 (92.3)	33.54 (92.37)	32.48 (90.46)	30.14 (86.25)	28.52 (83.34)	28.65 (83.57)	29.18 (84.52)	30.72 (87.30)	32.53 (90.55)	34.39 (93.90)	31.98 (89.56)
Daily mean °C (°F)	30.8 (87.4)	30.41 (86.74)	30.0 (86.0)	29.96 (85.93)	29.13 (84.43)	27.42 (81.36)	26.28 (79.30)	26.35 (79.43)	26.73 (80.11)	27.65 (81.77)	28.91 (84.04)	29.98 (85.96)	28.64 (83.55)
Mean daily minimum °C (°F)	24.19 (75.54)	25.26 (77.47)	25.77 (78.39)	25.71 (78.28)	25.2 (77.4)	24.08 (75.34)	23.53 (74.35)	23.5 (74.3)	23.78 (74.80)	24.13 (75.43)	24.72 (76.50)	24.38 (75.88)	24.52 (76.14)
Record low °C (°F)	19.0 (66.2)	21.0 (69.8)	22.0 (71.6)	24.0 (75.2)	22.0 (71.6)	20.0 (68.0)	19.0 (66.2)	20.0 (68.0)	19.0 (66.2)	20.0 (68.0)	21.0 (69.8)	20.0 (68.0)	19.0 (66.2)
Average rainfall mm (inches)	56.33 (2.22)	127.78 (5.03)	182.43 (7.18)	226.58 (8.92)	302.0 (11.89)	339.79 (13.38)	388.13 (15.28)	293.59 (11.56)	379.35 (14.94)	340.96 (13.42)	204.2 (8.04)	57.05 (2.25)	2,898.19 (114.11)
Average rainy days (≥ 1.0 mm)	10.45	19.09	27.45	26.27	27.82	29.09	30.27	28.0	29.27	29.09	26.91	12.45	296.16
Average relative humidity (%)	64.94	73.23	77.34	78.4	81.11	85.19	86.07	83.96	85.37	84.72	81.46	68.96	79.23
Source: tcktcktck

Bayelsa State has mostly received the effects of climate change due to environmental degradation and high levels of carbon emissions.

=== Environmental issues ===
Bayelsa State has been described as one of "most polluted places on Earth after decades of oil spills that have hurt farming and fishing."

==== Soot pollution ====
This is a black hazardous carbonate substance that pollutes the area due to its illegal burning of crude oil (locally called Kpo-fire). This carcinogenic chemical causes illnesses such as lung cancer, skin irritation, allergies, respiratory tract infections, eye problem, etc. Its effect is also meted on the environment as it causes air pollution, soil pollution, water pollution which has led to the death of both plants, humans and animals.

==== Flooding ====
This is a common annual problem in Bayelsa because it is located on the coast of the Atlantic Ocean. The rise of seawater is the major cause. The flooding has affected many communities, properties and human lives. Almost all areas in Bayelsa state are affected by flooding but Ekeremor, Southern Ijaw, Sagbama, Kolokuma/Opokuma and Yenagoa areas of Bayelsa state are more prone to flooding as it affects these areas yearly. Poor town planning is another major cause of flooding in Bayelsa State.

As of August 2022, the state was stricken with a flood, displacing over 1.3 million people and destroying livestock and properties.

==== Oil spillage ====
This is one of the major environmental issues in Bayelsa State due to the activities of major oil companies. Oil spillage has affected farmlands, aquatic life and the health of the people. Almost every day, Udengs Eradiri is informed of another oil spill in Bayelsa state, in the Niger Delta.

Eradiri said Bayelsa used to be green. You could go to a farm or go fishing and have a very impressive harvest. You could spend hours in the water and have a handful of fish. "Today," Eradiri adds, "you could spend the whole day without catching a glimpse of a fish."

Another major environmental issue in Bayelsa state is air pollution (soot). Today, many people in Bayelsa state lament that they cannot breathe due to the exposure of emissions of soot, a hazardous black amorphous carbon that has almost completely polluted the air in the areas.

However, stakeholders in the affected areas had in 2018 reportedly initiated a campaign with the common refrain; "Save Rivers from this soot of death", in the Rivers state region.

== Natural resources ==
Bayelsa State's natural resources include:

=== Mineral raw materials ===
- Natural gas
- Crude oil
- Salt

=== Agro raw materials ===
- Cassava
- Coco-yam
- Plantain
- Timber
- Maize
- Rice
- Yam
- Sugar-cane
- Oil palm

== Religion ==
The Catholic Church comprises parts of Bomadi Diocese (1991) under Bishop Hyacinth Oroko Egbebo (2009), a suffragan of the Archdiocese of Benin City.

== Transport ==
Major roads include the Isaac Adaka Boro Expressway 17 km north from Yenagoa to join A2 the Elele-Alimini-Patani East-West Rd east to Rivers State at Mbiama and northwest across the Forçados River to Delta State by the 850 m bridge (2014) at Patani.

Waterways are essential for transport as many communities are not accessible by road.

Bayelsa Airport on Wilberforce Island opened in 2019, with international flights approved in 2021.

== Languages ==
The major language spoken is Ijaw with dialects such as Kolokuma, Nembe. Other languages include Epie-Atissa, and Ogbia. Like the rest of Nigeria, English is the official language.

Languages of Bayelsa State listed by LGA:

LGA	Languages
Brass	Abureni, Southeast Ijo, Ogbia, Kugbo
Ekeremor	Izon
Kolokuma Opokuma	Kolokuma
Nembe	Abureni, Nembe, Ijaw
Ogbia	Abureni, Southeast Ijo, Odual, Ogbia, Oruma
Sagbama	Buseni, Isoko, Izon, Okodia, Urhobo
Southern Ijaw	Southeast Ijo, Izon
Yenagoa	Engenni, Epie-Atissa, Izon

== Notable people ==
- Diepreye Alamieyeseigha, former Nigerian politician and governor of Bayelsa State
- Diezani Alison-Madueke, former Minister of Solid Minerals, Transport and Petroleum resources
- General Owoye Andrew Azazi, Chief of Army Staff (Nigeria), Chief of Defense Staff under President Olusegun Obasanjo and National Security Adviser under President Goodluck Jonathan
- Noah Sarenren Bazee, professional footballer who plays for Bundesliga side Hannover 96
- Major Isaac Adaka Boro, Nigerian Civil War hero (Nigerian Army)
- Timi Dakolo, musical artist
- HRM Edmund Daukoru, Nigerian Minister of State for Energy, former Secretary General of the Organization of the Petroleum Exporting Countries in 2006
- Henry Seriake Dickson, former governor and politician
- King Alfred Diete-Spiff, former governor of Rivers State, HRM
- Senator Douye Diri, businessman, politician and lawmaker; governor of Bayelsa State
- Timini Egbuson, Nollywood actor
- Dakore Egbuson-Akande Nigerian actress
- Tamara Eteimo, also known by her stage name Tamara; from Angiama, Southern Ijaw local government of Bayelsa state; R&B singer-songwriter and actress
- Dan Etete, Minister of Petroleum Resources
- Finidi George, Super Eagles player
- Daniel Igali, Canadian Olympic gold medalist and world wrestling champion
- Ernest Ikoli, journalist and pre-independence freedom fighter
- Dr. Goodluck Jonathan GCFR GCON, 14th president of Nigeria
- Heineken Lokpobiri, Minister of State for Agriculture, Minister of State for Petroleum Resources (Oil)
- Senator Ben Murray-Bruce, represented Bayelsa East Senatorial District at the National Assembly; from Akassa in Bayelsa State of Nigeria
- Dr. Eruani Azibapu Godbless, businessman, politician and former Bayelsa State Commissioner for Health.
- Ebikibina Ogborodi, acting registrar of NECO
- Gabriel Okara, novelist and poet
- Chief Melford Okilo, 1st governor of Rivers State, former Senator, former Nigerian Minister
- Kemebradikumo Pondei, acting managing director of Niger Delta Development Commission
- Ebinabo Potts-Johnson, born in Bayelsa state; model and actress
- Samson Siasia, Super Eagles player and coach
- Timipre Sylva, former governor of Bayelsa state, Minister of State for Petroleum Resources
- Timaya, musical artist
- Patience Torlowei, fashion designer and artist

== Diaspora ==
Due to massive overseas scholarship programs implemented by the old Rivers State in the 1970s and recent Bayelsa State governments, large numbers of Bayelsa professionals reside in Europe and North America. This is part of the general brain-drain trend affecting many African communities.

== Education ==
The major tertiary institutions in Bayelsa state are:

- Bayelsa Medical University
- Federal Polytechnic Ekeowe
- Federal University Otuoke
- Isaac Adaka Boro College of Education
- Niger Delta University
- University of Africa, Toru Orua

== Local Government Areas ==
Bayelsa State consists of eight local government areas:

- Brass
- Ekeremor
- Kolokuma/Opokuma
- Nembe
- Ogbia
- Sagbama
- Southern Ijaw
- Yenagoa

== Politics ==
The state government is led by a democratically elected governor who works closely with members of the state House of Assembly. The Capital city of the state is Yenagoa.

== Electoral system ==
The electoral system of Bayelsa state is selected using a modified two-round system. To be elected in the first round, a candidate must receive the plurality of the vote and over 25% of the vote in at least two-thirds of the State's local government Areas. If no candidate passes the threshold, a second round will be held between the top candidate and the next candidate to have received a plurality of votes in the highest number of local government Areas.
