= Brass River =

River in Africa

- 2005 satellite view of Niger Delta. Brass River to the right

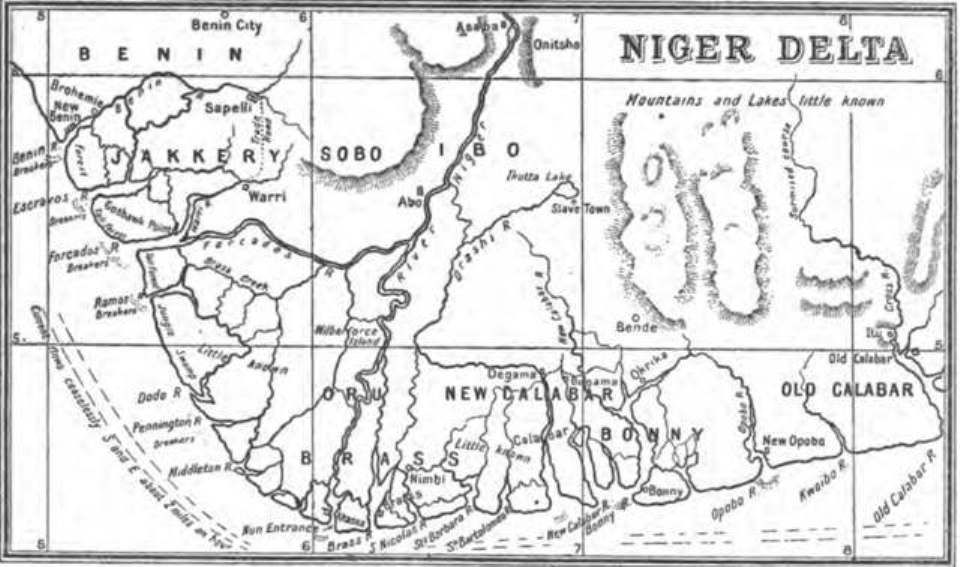
- Niger Delta in 1898. The Niger flows from the north, and bifurcates just below Abo. The Forçados flows west and the Nun continues south. The Brass leaves the east side of the Nun about half way to the coast at Yenagoa.

Location
- Country: Nigeria

Physical characteristics
- Source
  - coordinates: 4.944439°N 6.250647°E
- Mouth
  - coordinates: 4.317373°N 6.224294°E
- Length: 161 km (100 mi)

The Brass River is one of the branches of the Nun River, which in turn is a branch of the Niger River, in the Niger Delta in Nigeria. In the 19th century the river was an important trading route, first for slaves and later for palm oil. Brass River Crude Oil is named for a refinery on the river.

== Name ==
The name "Brass" is European, said to have been given to the Nembe coastal villages because they traded for brass pans and neptunes to use for salt boiling. The "Brass Ijo" were all the Ijaw people from Cape Formosa to the Santa Barbara River. The name was used specifically for Twon village on the Brass river, the route to the Nembe capital in the interior. In the 1884 and 1886 treaties "Brass" referred to the Nembe state. The Brass river was also called the Rio Bento, or St. John river.

== Course ==
The Brass River is a branch, or distributary, of the Nun River, which flows to the west. The Nun River is itself a continuation of the Niger River, which divides into the Nun and Forçados Rivers about 32 kilometres (20 mi) downstream from Aboh. The Brass leaves the east side of the Nun at Yenagoa and flows south to discharge into the Gulf of Guinea. The tidal flats of the river have a reticulate drainage pattern, with higher elevation at the edges of the flats than at the center. Discharge varies depending on the season and state of the tide:

Season	Tidal state	Width of estuary (m)	Av. Current Speed (m/s)	Total discharge (m^{3}/s)
Dry	Ebb	2,450.25	0.38	2,314.43
Dry	Flood	2,329.46	0.32	9,797.25
Wet	Ebb	2,441.90	0.95	20,637.63
Wet	Flood	2,411.99	0.32	9,669.77

An 1893 navigation guide says of the river,

The entrance is 3/4 mile wide, and lies between two points, which, when the entrance bears N.7° E. (N. 23° E. mag.), appear well defined, the trees on the western point being more rugged and lower than those on the eastern point, Within the entrance points, the river expands to 2 miles in width abreast the factories, (Note: The word "factories" is used in the old sense of trading posts, which were run by factors) which breadth it maintains as far as Opulobo or Big island, lying nearly in the middle of the river, 4 miles from the entrance.

The mouth of the river is protected by a sand bar, which in 1893 could not be crossed by vessels with more than 16 feet (4.9 m) draft. Akassa creek, 1.5 miles (2.4 km) inland from the mouth of the river, provided a route from the Brass river to the Nun river for vessels of 7 feet (2.1 m) draft. It was often used by merchant steamers trading on the Niger, since the entrance of the Brass was easier than that of the Nun. Many factories lay on the east shore of the Brass just inside the entrance, handling the extensive trade in palm oil and ivory. At that time Akedo, about 26 miles (42 km) above cape Nun, was the market place for traders from the Brass river.

The town of Twon-Brass lies near the mouth of the Brass River. This was a slaving port in the early 19th century, and later a collection point for palm oil and kernels. In 2005 the Nigerian Agip Oil Company (NAOC) was producing oil from 146 wells, and operated an export terminal at Brass River. Brass River Crude Oil is a sweet medium light crude.

== Early European exploration ==
In the 17th and 18th centuries the Portuguese controlled the Brass River, which was closed to British traders and was an outlet for shipping slaves to the Americas. The town of Brass was inaccessible, reached only via the creeks. After 1807 the British began trying to suppress the slave trade. Don Pablo Frexas, in alliance with the chiefs of Brass and Bonny, was the main organizer of the river's slave trade. James Holman visited the Guinea coast during his 1827−32 voyage round the world. Holman observed that all the rivers between the Bonny and Cape Formosa communicate with each other in the interior, and all were navigable by canoes. He wrote,

The river Nun, or First Brass River, is the main branch of the Quorra, (Note: "Quorra" or "Kwara" is the early European name for the lower Niger River) from whence you pass (in about two hours) through a creek, in an easterly direction, into the Second Brass River, which is also a large branch of the Quorra. ... Brass, properly speaking consists of two towns of nearly equal size, containing about a thousand inhabitants and built on the borders of a kind of basin, which is formed by a number of rivulets, entering it from the Niger, through forests of mangrove bushes.

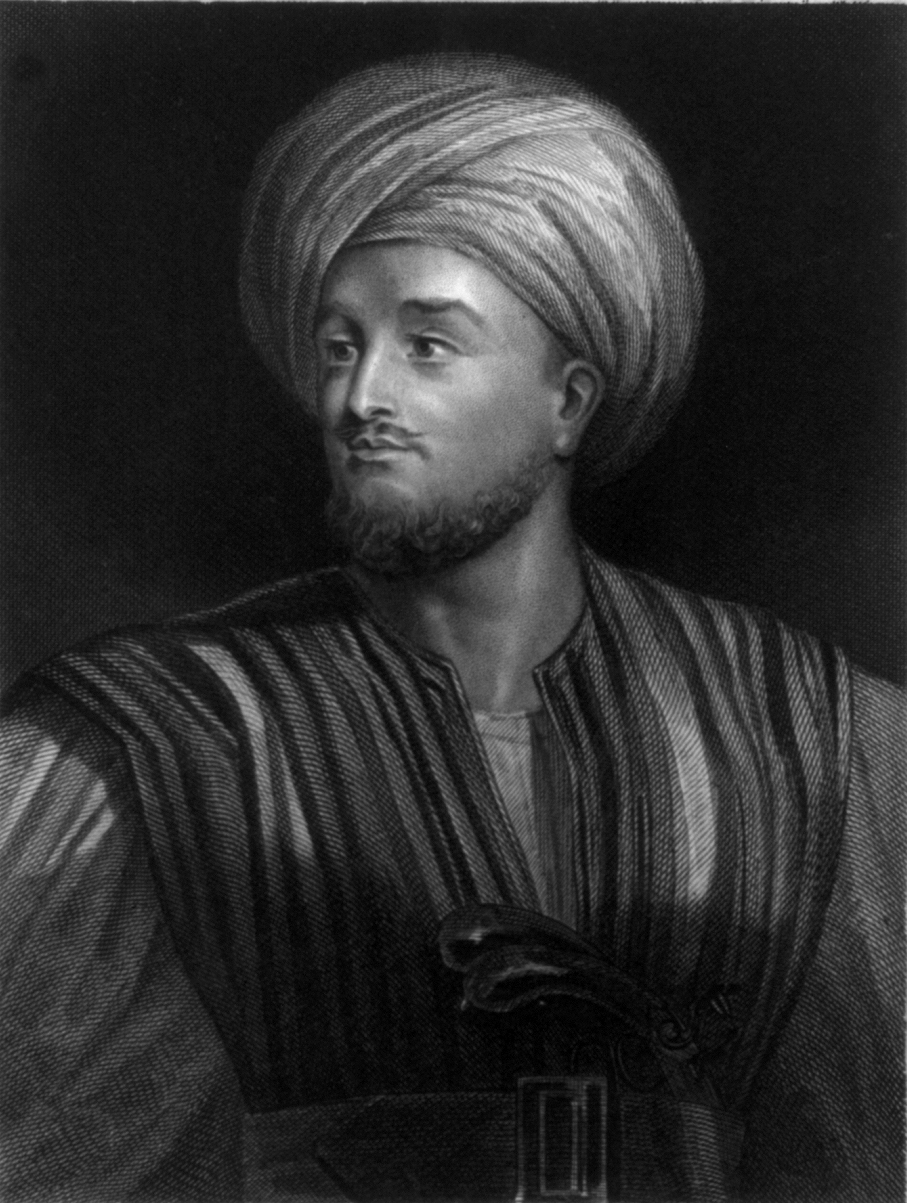
Richard Lemon Lander determined in 1830 that the Brass was one of the branches of the Niger

In June 1830 the explorer Richard Lemon Lander and this brother John reached Bussa on the Niger, the place where Mungo Park had died. After exploring the region, they started down the Niger on 20 September 1830, and reached Brass Town on 14 November 1830. Brass Town at this time was built on a large creek, which connected with the main Nun and Brass rivers by numerous winding rivulets. An account of the journey says,

On the evening of the 17th of November, Richard Lander, who had preceded his brother, arrived in the "Second Brass River," which is a large branch of the Quorra; and, half an hour afterwards, heard :the welcome sound of the surf on the beach." At seven o'clock on the following morning he arrived in the "First Brass River," (or the main branch of the Quorra,) which proved to be the stream already known to Europeans by the name of the Nun...

In 1838 the boats of H.M.S. Viper ascended the Brass river for about 60 miles (97 km). They reported that it was 400 yards (370 m) wide, and 9 to 10 fathoms (54 to 60 ft; 16 to 18 m) deep. The banks were fringed with impenetrable mangroves. On the return voyage they were assisted by a current running at 7 knots (13 km/h; 8.1 mph) along the western shore.

== Slave trade ==
An 1842 report to the British House of Commons said that "Slaves may be taken from the Bonny to the Brass River, and are taken there; the Brass River is not under King Peppel, and separate treaties must be made with the kings ... The slave trade up the Brass is carried on by agents from the Brazils and from the Havannah. King Peppel seldom makes good his engagements, He may be concerned in the slave trade on the Brass River. There have been no slave vessels at Bonny since the treaty with King Peppel, and the trade in the creeks of the Brass River is much reduced." The report included the testimony of Captain Gentle Brown, who said,

The slave trade is carried on by Spanish vessels, of from 80 to 200 tons, who procure false papers, and proceed from Havannah to Brass and other rivers in the Bight, there procure a cargo which is on shore at the town, ready to be shipped at an hour's notice, or when the vessel arrives. ... The principal slave trade is carried on in the Brass River, there being a number of slaves brought from the interior and sold for a mere trifle. ... [The slave trade] is, I believe, carried on by a Spanish resident at the town of Brass, and others of Spanish or Portuguese birth, and by all the natives. ... The principal number of slaves come from Eboe, Qua, and Brass, but all tribes, more or less, sell anybody they can catch, either by war or kidnapping. ... The price is 30 dollars, or about 5 [pounds] sterling, in goods, for a good slave."

On 17 November 1856 Thomas Joseph Hutchinson, Her Britannic Majesty's Consul for the Bight of Biafra and the Island of Fernando Po, concluded a treaty with the kings of the territories adjacent to the Brass River. They agreed to stop the slave trade, and agreed on pilots' fees, duties and other terms of trade. Hutchinson reported of a visit to Brass on 9 July 1857,

Through the whole passage of tortuous creeks that lead up to Brass there is not an inch of terra firma for human residence; and there is no trace of an abode at the town where any members of the human family (save the wretched negro denizens of this part of the world) could locate themselves. The ruin of an old slave-trading establishment, with partitions made of tin-plates, and so dilapidated as not to afford shelter even for a lizard, constitutes the only relic of the Traffic in the town.

== Later trade ==
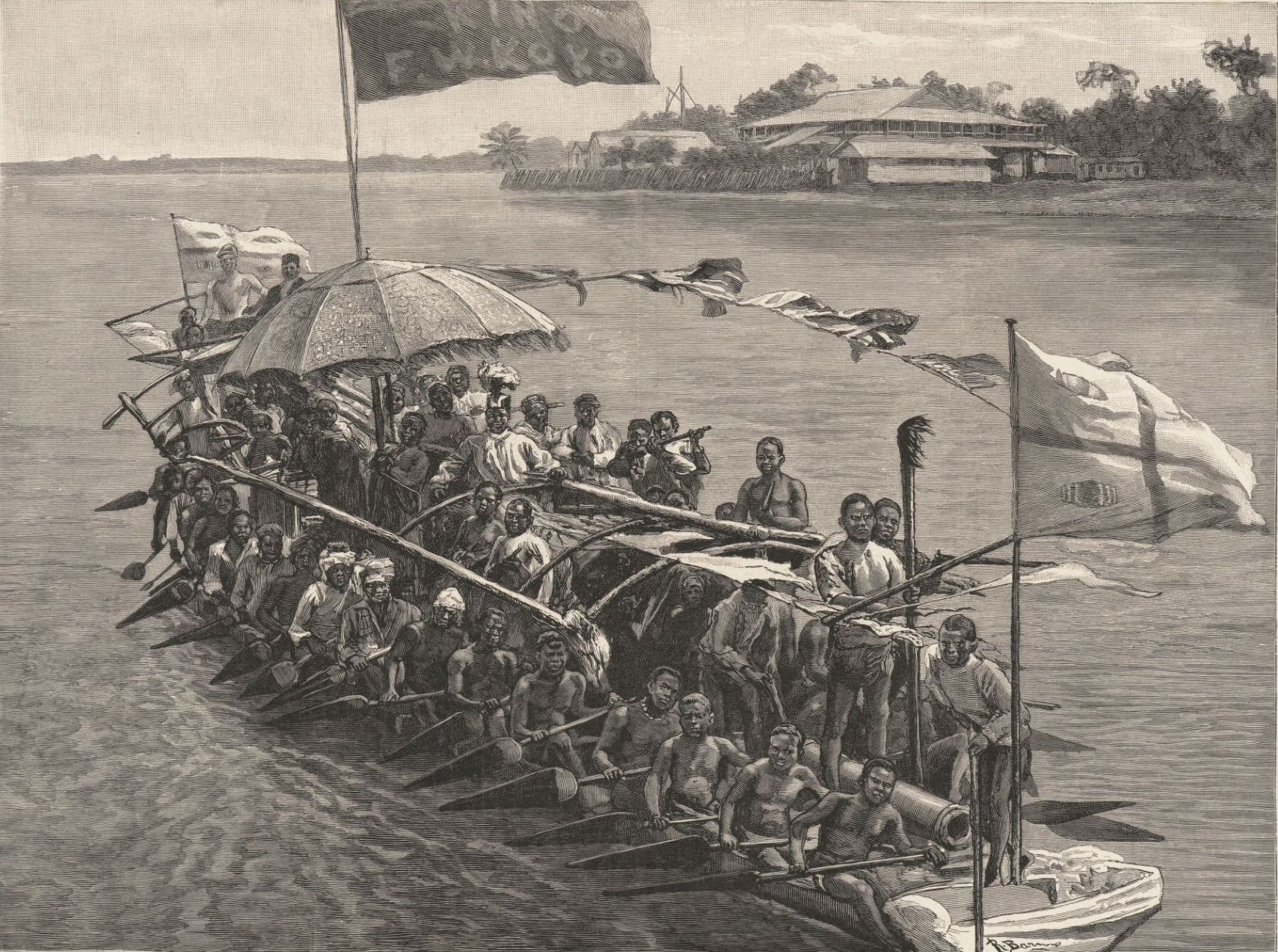
King Koko in His War Canoe on His Way Down the River, The Rising of the Brassmen on the Guinea Coast (1895)

In 1847 the new partnership of Stuart and Douglas bought a 282-ton barque, the Adriana, and sent it to the Brass River. Their agent was told to offer the local chiefs a share of the profits from palm oil trading on condition they stopped trading in slaves. This was the start of a lucrative new trade. The prominent Nigerian journalist and nationalist John Payne Jackson at first wanted to be a merchant. After traveling throughout West Africa, in the late 1860s he found work with the prominent Lagos merchant J. S. Leigh. He was sent to the Brass River in the 1870s to manage Leigh's station there. Jackson branched out into trading palm products on his own account, but was forced out of business by European competitors, an experience that may have affected his outlook towards Europeans.

S. A. Crowther, Bishop of Niger Territory, reported in 1885 that the native converts at Nembe, Brass River, had contributed towards building an iron church. It was opened on 9 October 1884 in presence of the congregation of 1,202 people. The congregation of St. Barnabas at Tawn, (Note: Presumably by "Tawn" the bishop meant "Twon") Brass River, had started to raise contributions for a similar iron church.

At one time the town of Twon-Brass was the main port of the Nembe Kingdom, called by one historian "the Venice of the Niger Delta", and was dominant in the palm oil trade of the region. When the Royal Niger Company became an increasingly strong rival in the trade, the town's economy was severely damaged. In January 1895 the Nembe king William Koko led a dawn attack of more than a thousand warriors on the company's headquarters at Akassa, which triggered a retaliatory raid that destroyed the kingdom's inland capital of Nembe. The British already had a consulate in Twon-Brass, from which after the fall of Koko they administered the area.

== Sources ==
- "Brass Nigeria". Encyclopædia Britannica.
- "Brass River Crude Oil". A Barrel Full.
- Chisholm, Hugh, ed. (1911). "Brass" . Encyclopædia Britannica. Vol. 4 (11th ed.). Cambridge University Press. p. 433.
- Crowther, S. A. (1887). "Diocese of the Niger River". The Official Year-book of the Church of England. Society for Promoting Christian Knowledge.
- Diop, Salif; Barusseau, Jean-Paul; Descamps, Cyr (2014). The Land/ocean Interactions in the Coastal Zone of West and Central Africa. Springer. ISBN 978-3-319-06388-1.
- Falola, Toyin (1 January 2007). Encyclopedia of the Middle Passage. Greenwood Publishing Group. ISBN 978-0-313-33480-1.
- Falola, Toyin; Genova, Ann (1 January 2005). The Politics of the Global Oil Industry: An Introduction. Greenwood Publishing Group. ISBN 978-0-275-98400-7.
- Geary, Sir W. (1927). Nigeria under British Rule.
- Great Britain. Hydrographic Dept (1885). Africa Pilot, Or Sailing Directions for the West Coast of Africa ...: North Atlantic islands & Cape Spartel to river Cameroon.
- Great Britain. Parliament. House of Commons (1842). House of Commons Papers. H.M. Stationery Office.
- Holman, James (1834). A Voyage Round the World: Including Travels in Africa, Asia, Australasia, America, Etc. Etc. from MDCCCXXVII to MDCCCXXXII. Smith, Elder. p. 369.
- Hutchinson, Thomas J.; Mitchell, John P. (1858). "Correspondence". Accounts and Papers of the House of Commons. Ordered to be printed.
- Jones, G. I. (1 January 2000). The Trading States of the Oil Rivers: A Study of Political Development in Eastern Nigeria. LIT Verlag Münster. ISBN 978-3-8258-4777-7.
- McCall, Ian (2010). "NIGERIA, A PERSONAL HISTORY Chapter 11 - GEORGE GOLDIE (2): From Economic to Political Power". Ian McCall. Archived from the original on 13 March 2004.
- Murray, Hugh (1832). Narrative of discovery and adventure in Africa: from the earliest ages to the present time : with illustrations of the geology, mineralogy, and zoology. Oliver & Boyd, Tweeddale-Court.
- "Nun River". Encyclopædia Britannica.
- Obichere, Boniface I. (27 July 2005). Studies in Southern Nigerian History: A Festschrift for Joseph Christopher Okwudili Anene 1918-68. Routledge. ISBN 978-1-135-78108-8.
- Omu, Fred I. A. (December 1974). "Journalism and the Rise of Nigerian Nationalism: John Payne Jackson, 1848-1915". Journal of the Historical Society of Nigeria. 7 (3). Historical Society of Nigeria: 521–539. JSTOR 41857035.
- Parker, John (1838). The Life and Travels of Mungo Park; with the Account of His Death, from the Journal of Isaaco, the Substance of Later Discoveries Relative to His ... Fate ..., and the Termination of the Niger. J. W. Parker.
- Nyananyo, B.L.; Okeke, C.U.; Mensah, S (March 2006). "Physico-chemical conditions and distribution of phytoplankton in the Brass River, Nigeria". J. Appl. Sci. Environ. MGT. 10 (1).
- "Tourism in Bayelsa State". Bayelsa State Union of Great Britain and Ireland. Archived from the original on 1 March 2010.
- United States. Hydrographic Office (1893). West Coast of Africa, from Cape Spartel to Cape Agulhas: Including the Islands in the Bight of Biafra, Ascension, St. Helena, Tristan Da Cunha, and Gough Islands. U.S. Government Printing Office.
- Wilkinson, Susan (2007). Mimosa: The Life & Times of the Ship that Sailed to Patagonia. Y Lolfa. ISBN 978-0-86243-952-1.
