= Igbo people in the Atlantic slave trade =

The Igbo of Igboland (in present-day Nigeria) became one of the principal ethnic groups to be enslaved during the Atlantic slave trade. An estimated 14.6% of all enslaved people were taken from the Bight of Biafra, a bay of the Atlantic Ocean that extends from the Nun outlet of the Niger River (Nigeria) to Limbe (Cameroon) to Cape Lopez (Gabon) between 1650 and 1900. The Bight's major slave trading ports were located in Bonny and Calabar.

== History ==
The majority of enslaved Igbo were acquired during village raids. The journey for enslaved Igbo often began in the ancient Cave Temple that was located in Arochukwu Kingdom. During this period, the three Igbo Kingdoms followed the same culture and religion, yet tended to operate very differently from each other. The Kingdom of Nri and the Independent Igbo States (confederation of independently ruled Igbo states) did not practice slavery, and enslaved people from neighbouring lands would often flee to these kingdoms in order to be set free. Arochukwu, on the other hand, practiced a system of indentured servitude that was remarkably different from chattel slavery in the Americas.

The Aro Confederacy's relationship with the Europeans was driven not just by economic goals, but also by the need to counter another external threat as they're facing them. Europeans began their encroachment on Igbo territory, causing the kingdoms to desire weaponry to defend themselves. In order to obtain European goods and weaponry, Arochukwu began to raid villages of the other Igbo kingdoms – primarily those located in the Igbo hinterlands. People would be captured, regardless of gender, social status, or age. Enslaved people could have been originally farmers, nobility, or even people who had committed petty crimes. These captured people would be taken and sold to European slave traders on the coast. Another way people were enslaved was through the divine oracle who resided in the Cave Temple complex, as part of the Osu Caste System.

All Igbos practised divination called odinala, but the Kingdom of Arochukwu was different because it was headed by a divine oracle who was in charge of making decisions for the king. During this time, if someone committed a crime, was in debt, or did something considered an "Osu" meaning "abomination" (for example, the killing of certain kinds of animals was considered an abomination due to its association with certain deities), they would be taken to the cave complex to face the oracle for sentencing. The oracle, who was also influenced by the demands of European slave traders, would sentence these people to slavery, even for small crimes. The victim would be commanded to walk further into the cave so that the spirits could "devour" them, but, in reality, they were taken to an opening on the other side and loaded directly onto a waiting boat. This boat would take them to a slave ship en route to the Americas.

Igbo people were known to be rebellious and even having a large percentage of suicide in order to avoid slavery.

== Dispersal ==
Igbo people were dispersed mainly to the British West Indies, of which Jamaica received the highest amount of enslaved Igbo people.

Enslaved Igbo were dispersed to Jamaica, Barbados, Trinidad and Tobago, Cuba, Haiti, & the United States.

Some recorded populations of people of African descent on Caribbean islands recorded 2,863 Igbo on Trinidad and Tobago in an 1813 census; 894 in Saint Lucia in an 1815 census; 440 on Saint Kitts and Nevis in an 1817 census; and 111 in Guyana in an 1819 census. (Note: Slave population born in Africa may not express the complete number of people in these countries with Igbo ancestry at the time.)

=== Barbados ===
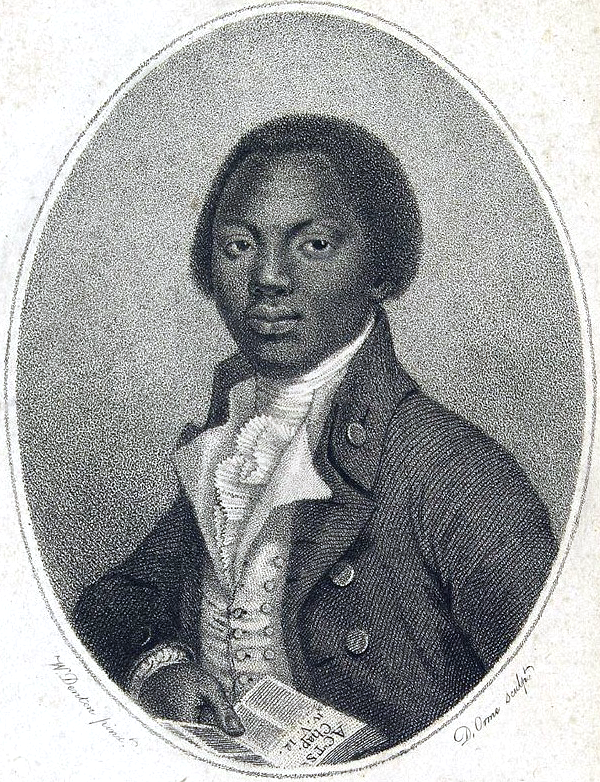
Olaudah Equiano

The Igbo were dispersed to Barbados in large numbers. Olaudah Equiano, a famous Igbo author, abolitionist and formerly enslaved person, was dropped off there after being kidnapped from his hometown near the Bight of Biafra. After arriving in Barbados he was promptly trafficked to Virginia. At his time, 44 percent of the 90,000 Africans disembarking on the island (between 1751 and 1775) were from the bight. The links between Barbados and the Bight of Biafra had begun in the mid-seventeenth century, with half of the African captives arriving on the island originating from there.

=== Haiti ===
Haiti had many enslaved Igbo. There is still the Creole saying of Nou se Igbo (We are Igbos). Aspects of Haitian culture that exhibit this can be seen in the loa, a Haitian loa (or deity) created by the in the Vodun religion.

=== Jamaica ===
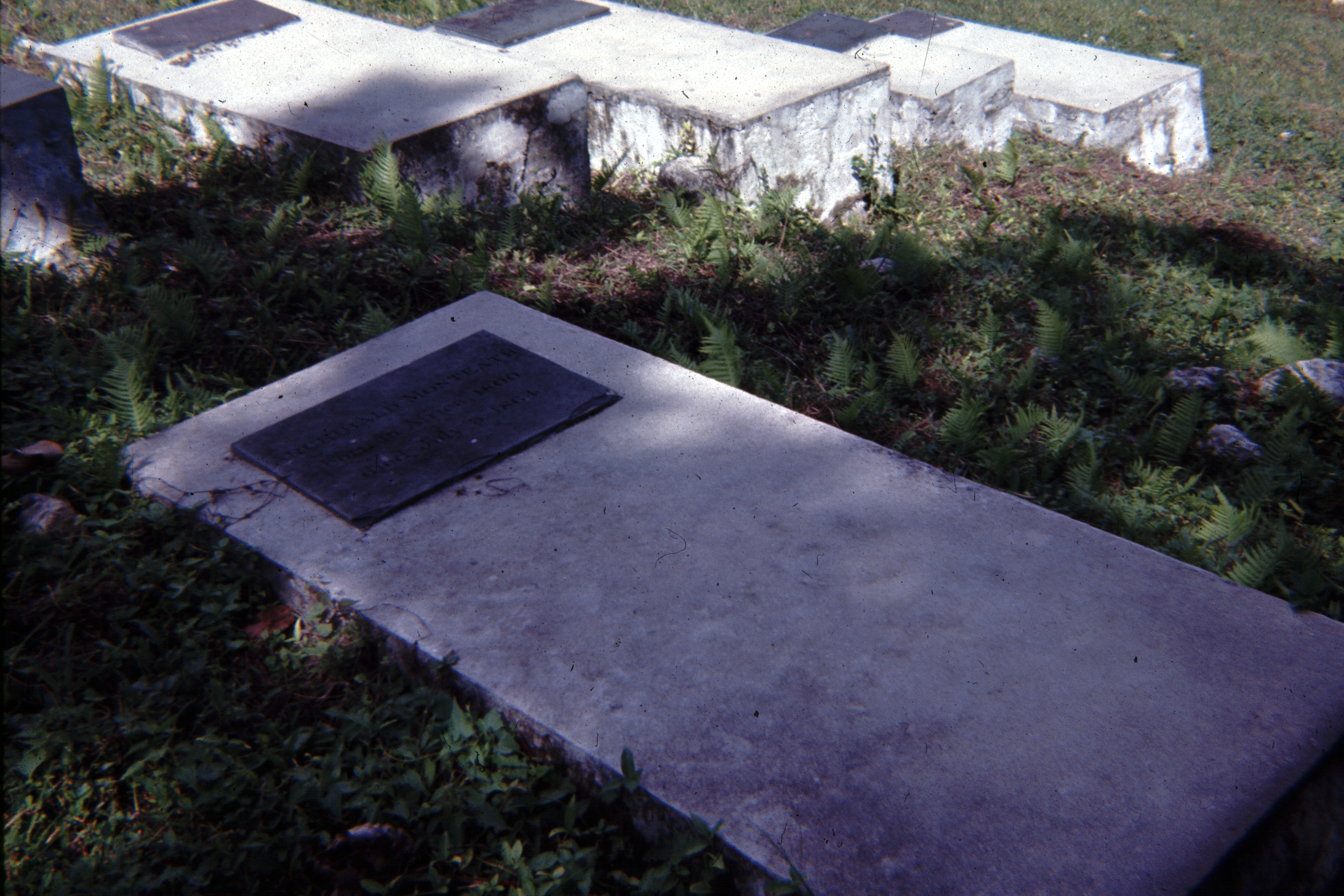
The grave of an enslaved Igbo, Archibald Monteith (1800–1864), in the Carmel Moravian Church of Westmoreland.

Bonny and Calabar emerged as major embarkation points of enslaved West Africans destined for Jamaica's slave markets in the 18th century. Dominated by Bristol and Liverpool slave ships, these ports were used primarily for the supply of enslaved people to British colonies in the Americas. In Jamaica, the bulk of enslaved Igbo arrived relatively later than the rest of other arrivals of Africans on the Island in the period after the 1750s. There was a general rise in the number of enslaved people arriving to the Americas, particularly British colonies, from the Bight of Biafra in the 18th century; the heaviest of these forced migrations occurred between 1790 and 1807. The result of such slaving patterns made Jamaica, after Virginia, the second most common destination for enslaved people trafficked from the Bight of Biafra; as the Igbo formed the majority from the Bight, they became largely represented in Jamaica in the 18th and 19th centuries.

=== United States ===
From the mid-1600s to 1830, the US trafficked enslaved Igbos to the states of Virginia and Maryland in order to profit from their labour on tobacco plantations. The presence of the Igbo in this region was so profound that the Frontier Culture Museum of Virginia decided to erect a full-scale traditional Igbo village in Staunton, Virginia.

In 1803, 75 Igbos committed suicide after arriving in Dunbar Creek in Savannah, Georgia. The act of resistance is known as Igbo Landing today. The Natchez planter, William Dunbar, wrote in 1807 that enslaved Igbos were not preferred in his district.
