= Ralph Iwowari =

Nigerian traditional ruler (1930–2013)

Ralph Michael Iwowari, or Mein VII (1930 – 2013), was the Amanyanabo, or traditional ruler of Nembe-Bassambiri, one of the sections of the Nembe Kingdom in Bayelsa State, Nigeria.

In July 1973, Ralph Iwowari was aide-de-camp to the military Governor of Rivers State, Naval Commander Alfred Diete-Spiff. it was alleged he became furious with a journalist who published a critical article on the governor's birthday, and ordered him to be given 24 strokes of the cane and to have his head shaved with an old blade.

Violence is endemic in the region, in part due to problems caused by oil exploitation and in part due to traditional rivalries. In August 2003 Iwowari, chairman of Bayelsa State's council of traditional rulers, met with the state Governor Diepreye Alamieyeseigha, who noted that it had become necessary for traditional rulers to initiate vigilante groups to combat piracy in the creeks and rivers of the Niger Delta.

In 2003 or 2004, Nembe Bassambiri was involved in fighting with a rival community in which many homes were destroyed, people were killed and others fled and went into hiding. The cause was a dispute over revenue from oil extraction in nearby Obioku village by Shell Nigeria, which was claimed by both Nembe Bassambiri and by the village of Odioma. In October 2004, Iwowari conducted elaborate ceremonies to mark the end of the crisis.

In January 2009, thugs supporting an unpopular political candidate invaded the Bassambiri community. Early reports said over 40 people might have died, the King's palace had been barred with palm fronds signifying danger fortunately he was not hurt. After things had settled down, just one body was found floating in a canal, although there were many injuries. The state governor invited Iwowari and local leaders to a meeting to find a solution to the conflict.

In April 2010, the Bayelsa State government attempted once more to resolve the ongoing discord between the Bassambiri and Ogbolomabiri communities, bringing together Ralph Michael Iwowari MEIN VII, Amanyanabo of Nembe-Bassambiri with Edmund Daukoru, Amanyanabo of Nembe Kingdom and other chiefs to find a solution. After the meeting, both kings said they were optimistic that the differences between the two feuding communities could be resolved.

He died in 2013 and was buried on 30 November 2014.
