= Twon-Brass =

Community in Nigeria

Coordinates: 4°19′N 6°15′E

The Brasstown Sign

Twon-Brass, previously known simply as Brass or Brasstown, is a Nembe speaking community on Brass Island in the Nun River estuary of Southern Bayelsa State, Nigeria, in the Brass Local Government Area. Twon Brass was found in the year, 1895 The traditional ruler is King Alfred Diete-Spiff, Amanayabo of Twon-Brass, The town is on the east shore of the Brass River, one of the branches of the Nun River, which in turn is a branch of the Niger River.

== History ==
Brass began as a mining village of the Nembe people. In the early 19th-century it was an important location in the slave trade.

At one time the town was the main port of the Nembe Kingdom, called by one historian "the Venice of the Niger Delta", and was dominant in the palm oil trade of the region. When the Royal Niger Company became an increasingly strong rival in the trade, the town's economy was severely damaged. In January 1895 the Nembe king William Koko led a dawn attack of more than a thousand warriors on the company's headquarters at Akassa, which triggered a retaliatory raid that destroyed the kingdom's inland capital of Nembe. The British already had a consulate in Twon-Brass, from which after the fall of Koko they administered the area.

In the mid-20th century it was the base of several fisheries and a center for the shipping of palm products. It was also a location for the shipment of rubber.

There are plans for a multibillion-dollar gas facility on Brass Island. Agip Oil Company and Nigeria Liquefied Natural Gas operate terminals in the town. In February 2009 gunmen in two speedboats attacked troops guarding the Agip oil terminal, but were repelled. The Movement for the Emancipation of the Niger Delta (MEND) had threatened to target Italian companies since Italy had apparently offered to supply two attack boats to the Nigerian military.

Tourist attractions include beautiful Atlantic Ocean beaches, the graves of British soldiers who died in the Nembe-British fighting of 1895 and the old consulate buildings, which were in use till the end of the colonial period in 1960.

== Climate ==
In Twon-Brass, the wet season is overcast, the dry season is mostly overcast, and it is oppressive and warm year round.
