= 2026 Bayelsa boat disaster =

2026 boat sinking in Nigeria

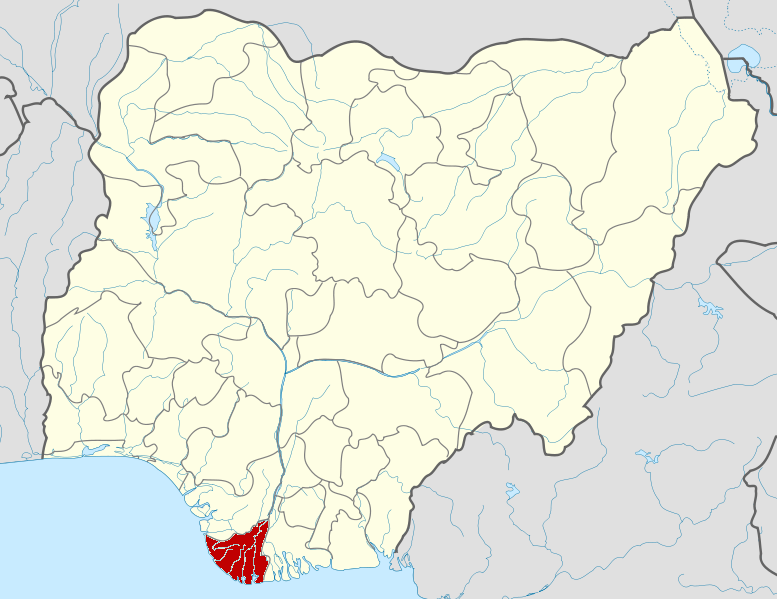
- Date: 20 November 2026
- Time: 11:00 am local time
- Location: Nun River near the Oweikorogha Community, Bayelsa State, Nigeria; Near 04°52′17.8″N 6°10′20.5″E
- Type: Shipwreck
- Cause: Capsizing
- Deaths: 50+
- Injuries: 24
- Missing: 300

On 20 November, 2026, a barge carrying a large group of funeral-goers capsized in the Nun River near the Oweikorogha Community of Bayelsa State, Nigeria. At least 50 people died, while around 300 are reported missing and 24 are rescued but injured. Search and rescue operations are ongoing.

== Accident ==
The barge, known as Love Boat, was travelling to the Ukubie Community, Bayelsa State and carrying more than 330 people for a funeral ceremony. According to some witnesses, several of the passengers had requested that the boat make a stopover in the Oweikorogha Community to let some people disembark, but this request was ignored.

According to the Bayelsa Police, while sailing in the Nun River and after passing the Oweikorogha Community, the barge experienced a mechanical problem possibly caused by overloading around 11 a.m. West Africa Time and capsized, throwing hundreds of people into the water.

Preliminary casualty figures by local authorities stated that at least 50 people are dead and 300 are missing. At least 24 people were rescued from the river, with various degrees of injuries, and transported to local hospitals. As of November 21 at least 50 bodies were recovered from the water and brought to local morgues.

== Aftermath ==
The boat's operator reportedly fled the accident, while the manager of the boat company was taken into custody. Several local residents and divers have volunteered to help in the rescue operations.
