= Tony Ezenna =

Nigerian businessman

- Born: 21 April 1957 (age 69)
- Education: St. David Primary School
- Occupations: Businessman, founder of Orange Drugs Nigeria Limited
- Spouse: Elizabeth Ezenna
- Children: 3

Anthony Ifeanyichukwu Ezenna (born 21 April 1957) is a Nigerian businessman and philanthropist. He is the founder of Orange Drugs Nigeria Limited, a company that specializes in the distribution of pharmaceutical and beauty products from Indonesia, Germany, Italy, and the United States to Nigeria.

== Early life ==
Ezenna was born in Port Harcourt, River State, Nigeria, where he grew up before moving to Onitsha. He attended St. David Primary School in Owerre Akokwa, followed by Christ the King College, Onitsha for his high school education. He later paused his education due to financial hardship and joined his father's business.

== Personal life ==
He is married to Elizabeth Ezenna and is a devout Christian.

Since 2017, they reside in Houston, Texas. They have two children: Ezra and Olanna.

His other son, Ernest, married Adaobi, the daughter of Chief Paul Nweke, on 10 August 2024.

Ezenna's brother, Chief Chinedu Ezenna, passed away two months before the wedding.

In 2018, he returned to Nigeria, where he became a neighbour of the current President of Nigeria, Asiwaju Bola Tinubu.
