= Patrick Utomi =

Nigerian professor and politician

Patrick Okedinachi Utomi
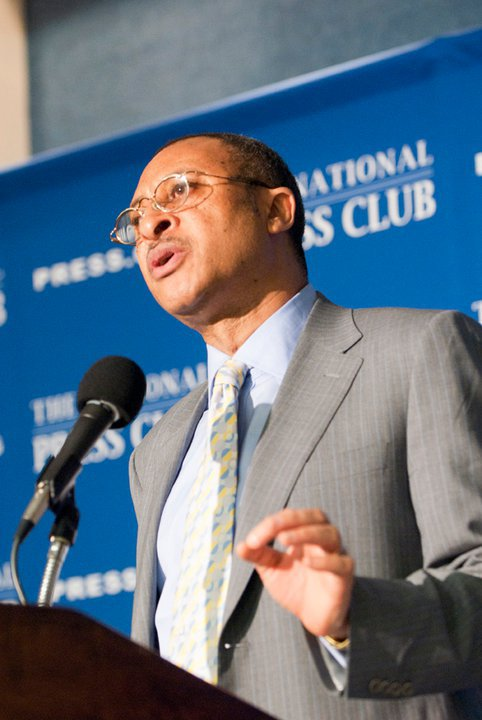

Professor Lagos Business School

Personal details
- Born: 6 February 1956 (age 70) Kaduna, Nigeria
- Education: Indiana University
- Profession: Professor

Patrick Okedinachi Utomi (born 6 February 1956) is a Nigerian professor of political economy and management expert. He is a Fellow of the Institute of Management Consultants of Nigeria and a former presidential candidate. He is the founder of Centre for Value in Leadership (CVL) and the political party, the African Democratic Congress. He is a professor at Lagos Business School, and has served in senior positions in government, as an adviser to the president of Nigeria, the private sector, as Chief Operating Officer at Volkswagen Nigeria.

== Background ==
Patrick Utomi was born in Kaduna, he is a descent of Igbuzo in Oshimili North Local Government Area of Delta State. He had his primary education at St. Thomas, Kano 1960 - 1962; Our Lady of Fatima, Gusau 1962 - 1966; Christ the King College, Onitsha and Loyola College, Ibadan, finishing his secondary education at the age of 15. The entry age for university education was 17, so he enrolled at the Federal School of Arts and Science in the interim. He later got admission into the University of Nigeria, Nsukka in 1973 to study Mass Communication. Patrick Utomi graduated from University of Nigeria Nsukka in 1977, He attended Indiana University, Bloomington, Indiana, USA, where he got his Ph.D. MPA, MA. He was appointed Professor of Social and Political Economy Environment of Business and Entrepreneurship at Lagos Business School in 2003. he has been a scholar-in-residence at the Harvard Business School and the American University in Washington, D.C.

== Career ==
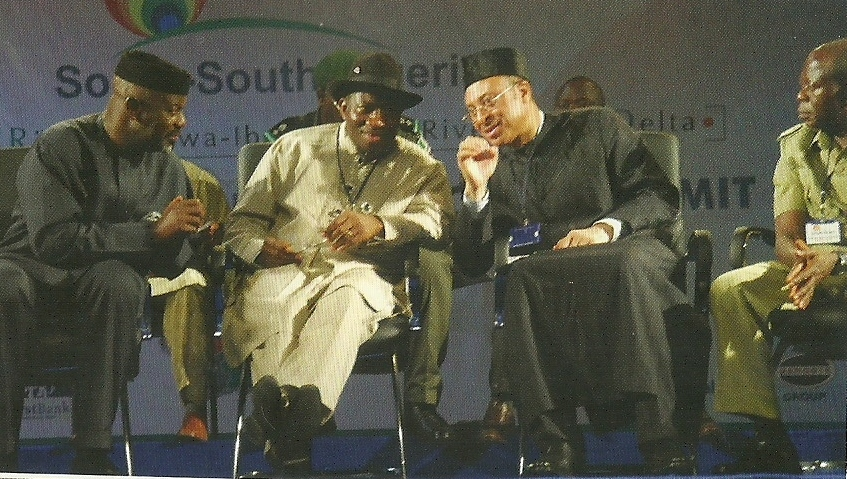
South South Economic Summit 2009 - Gov. Imoke, President Goodluck Jonathan, Pat Utomi Gov. Oshiomole

A few months after his return to Nigeria, Pat got enlisted by the former Vice President Alex Ekwueme to provide consultancy services on some public policy papers. Soon after, he was appointed Special Assistant by former President Shehu Shagari a position he lost following the military coup of December 1983, which terminated the Second Republic.

Following the end of the Second Republic, he became Chairman/Chief Executive Officer, Utomapp Holdings Limited, 1984 – 1986, and Assistant General Manager, Corporate Affairs, Volkswagen Nigeria Lagos, 1983 - 1993.

Utomi was Scholar-in-Residence, American University, Washington DC, USA, 1996 and Research Associate, the Harvard Business School, Boston, Massachusetts, USA, 1996. (Lagos Business school started operating in 1991.)

Utomi also belongs to many professional bodies. He is a member of the Nigerian Institute of Public Relations, NIPR, Institute of Directors, IOD, Nigeria Economic Summit Group and Nigeria Economic Society.

Utomi coordinated the establishment of several civil society groups on good governance and accountability such as Transparency in Nigeria, the Centre for Values in Leadership, the Concerned Professionals, and the Restoration Group. In the business sphere, Utomi was the Vice Chairman of Platinum–Habib Bank. He is a columnist and chairman.

Utomi has served in various private sector associations including the Lagos Chamber of Commerce and Industry (LCCI), the National Council of the Manufacturers Association of Nigeria, he is also the Chairman of Poise Nigeria Limited, and the Nigeria Employers Consultative Association (NECA). He has spoken on issues in the following areas on various international platforms; growth economics, comparative development, leadership, oil, and China's economic surge and growing influence in Africa. He has collaborated frequently with the Center for Strategic and International Studies (CSIS) in Washington, and Chatham House, in the UK. He has also written commissioned papers for the UK's DFID including the latest collaboration with Colleagues from Oxford on the Political Economy of growth in Nigeria (2006).

Utomi also ran a failed attempt for presidency of Nigeria in 2011. In 2021, Pat and other political stakeholders pioneered the formation of a new political opposition ahead of the 2023 Nigerian general elections.

== Governorship candidacy ==
Pat Utomi was declared as the governorship candidate of the All Progressive Congress for the 2019 general election in Delta State by a faction of the All Progressive Congress. The national working Committee of the All Progressive Congress later overturned the declaration and announced Chief Great Ogboru as its Delta state gubernatorial candidate for the 2019 general elections.

== Honors and awards ==
- Nominated and voted by the Public as one of Nigeria's top ten Living Legends in the Vanguard/Silverbird Television Awards.
- Great Nigeria Lives of the 20th Century;
- Who is who in Africa

== Books and selected publications ==
- Utomi P., Nigeria as an Economic Power House, Can it be Achieved in Robert P Rothberg (ed) Crafting the New Nigeria – Confronting the Challenges. Lynne Rienner Publishers Boulder Co. 2004 pg 125 – 138
- Utomi P. Nigeria “Changes as Prospects” in the Africa Competitiveness Report (ed) Jeffrey Sachs, World Economic Forum 2000
- Utomi P, Performance under Constraints. The Nigeria Press Under Military Rule. Gazette Vol 28 1982
- Utomi P, Historical – Philosophical Foundations of Government Ownership of Newspapers in Nigeria. Gazette vol 27 no 1 1981
- Utomi P, Values and Economic Stagnation in Africa: A Paradox of Poverty in Nigeria. The International Journal of African Studies Vol. 3.2. Spring 2004
- Utomi P, Managing Uncertainty: Competition and Strategy in Emerging Economies. Ibadan. Spectrum Books 1998
- Utomi P, To Serve is to Live. Ibadan. Spectrum Books, 1999
- Utomi, Patrick Okedinachi. To Serve is to Live: Autobiographical Reflections on the Nigerian Condition. Spectrum Books Limited, 2002.
- Utomi P, Critical Perspectives in Political Economy and Management, Ibadan. Spectrum Books, 2000
- Utomi P, Why Nations are Poor, Lagos. Business Day Books 2006
- Utomi P, Business Angel as a Missionary, London. Makeway Press, 2010
- Utomi P, Conscience: Opinions in the Struggle for Nation Building, Lagos Patike Book 1999
- Utomi P, Perspectives: Further Thoughts in the Quest for National Rebirth Patike Books, 2000.
- Edited Volumes of Interview with Pat Utomi. Golden Thoughts compiled by Godfrey Obioma Intec Press 2004.
- In the words of Pat Utomi edited by Uju Onyechere, Lagos. Benson Edwards Publications, 2003
- Pat Utomi: A Purpose driven life: Interviews of Pat Utomi by Godfrey Obioma
- The Duty to Lead: An article by Pat Utomi
- Contributor to 40 First Job: A book by Ukinebo Dare
- The Art of Leading: Open Secrets of Leadership Effectiveness. CVL/Makeway Press, 2015
- Pat Utomi.“Power, Politics, Public Policy Process and Performance”
- Utomi, Patrick Okedinachi. Golden Thoughts: Creative Views and Writings of Professor Pat Utomi on the Nigerian Economy, Politics and Social System. Godfrey Obioma, 2004.

== Keynotes speeches ==
Keynote speaker at the Annual Conferences of the following:

- Nigerian Institute of Management
- Nigeria Institute of Quantity Surveyors
- Institute of Personnel Management of Nigeria (4 times)
- Nigeria Institute of Public Relations
- Nigeria Institute of Marketing
- Law Society, Obafemi Awolowo University, Ife

Has been guest speaker at the annual Business Club meetings of the Africa Business Club at the Harvard Business School, Wharton, Kellogg School and the TedxEuston at the University of London.
