= Alfred Diete-Spiff =

Nigerian soldier and politician (born 1942)

Alfred Papapreye Diete-Spiff

Military Governor of Rivers State
- In office 28 May 1967 – July 1975
- Preceded by: Chukwuemeka Odumegwu Ojukwu (Eastern Region)
- Succeeded by: Zamani Lekwot

Personal details
- Born: 30 July 1942 (age 84)

Alfred Papapreye Diete-Spiff (born 30 July 1942) was the first Military Governor of Rivers State, Nigeria after it was created from part of the old Eastern Region, Nigeria. He held office from May 1967 until July 1975 during the military administration of General Yakubu Gowon. He was also a member of the Supreme Military Council.

Diete-Spiff is an Ijaw from Bayelsa State and the Amayanabo (King) of Twon-Brass, Bayelsa State, born on 30 July 1942. He was educated at St. Joseph's College in Western Cameroon and Britannia Royal Naval College in Dartmouth, England. He joined the Nigerian Navy and was commissioned ships diving officer in 1964. When appointed Military Governor of Rivers State in 1967, he was a Naval Lieutenant Commander at the age of 25.

In 1973, a correspondent for the Nigerian Observer wrote an article about an impending teacher's strike, which was published on Diete-Spiff's birthday. Taking this as a deliberate insult, Diete-Spiff's aide Ralph Iwowari had the reporter's head publicly shaved and had him beaten with 24 lashes of a cane.

In December 2009, Diete-Spiff was National Chairman of the Nigerian Association of Auctioneers.

He was in the 2005 Confab and served in the Committee on Models and Structure of Government.

He has a son who auditioned for Nigerian Idols Season 7.

== Awards ==
In October 2022, a Nigerian national honour of Commander of the Order of the Federal Republic (CFR) was conferred on him by President Muhammadu Buhari.
