= Christ the King College, Onitsha =

Boys high school in Onitsha, Nigeria

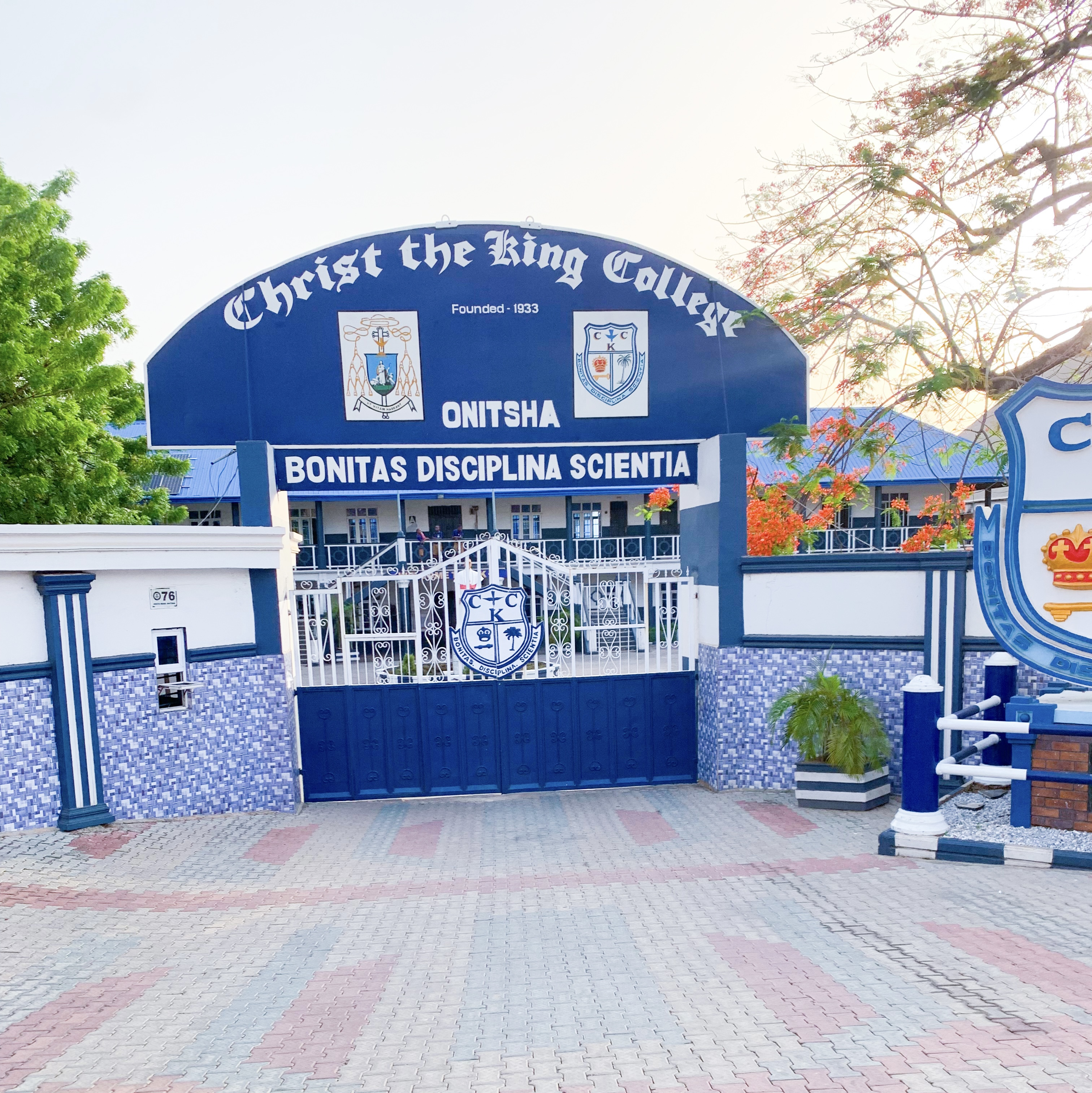

Location
- Oguta Road, Onitsha, Anambra; Nigeria; 6.14284°N 6.79086°E

Information
- Former name: Heerey High School (1973-1976)
- Type: Private Non-profit All-boys secondary education institution
- Motto: Bonitas, Disciplina, Scientia (Latin); Goodness, Discipline, Knowledge (English)
- Religious affiliation: Roman Catholic
- Established: 2 February 1933
- Founder: Archbishop Charles Heerey
- Head teacher: Rev.Father Celestine Arinze Okafor
- Colours: Royal Blue and White
- Website: http://www.ckconitsha.com/

Christ the King College, Onitsha (CKC), popularly known as CKC Onitsha, or Amaka Boys, is a Catholic all-boys secondary school in Onitsha, Nigeria. It is ranked the top-ranked high school in Nigeria and 36th in the top 100 best high schools in Africa as of February 2014.

CKC was founded on February 2, 1933, by the late Archbishop Charles Heerey, CsSp, along with Fredrick Akpali Modebe and his wife Margret, who (like in the other schools they founded) not only provided the land, but also built the first administration block and the first hostel accommodation. Heerey remained the proprietor of the school until his death in the spring of 1967.

The chief mission of the school is to develop indigenous manpower and leadership skills from the vast pool of Nigerian youths and in a Catholic tradition and environment. The first principal of the college was Fr Leo Brolly.

== History ==
CKC was affected adversely by the Nigerian Civil War (1967–1970). Most of its infrastructure was destroyed. The school was taken over by the East Central State Government in 1973 and renamed "Heerey High School", after its founder. However, following representations by its alumni, the school's name was changed back to its original name, "Christ The King College (CKC)" in 1976, and the pre-war first indigenous principal of the school, Rev. Fr. Nicholas Tagbo, was also brought back that year to reorganize, rebuild, and re-energize the school. CKC was finally returned to the Catholic Mission by the state government on 1 January 2009.

== The school ==
CKC is located on Oguta Road in Onitsha, Anambra State, Nigeria. Its motto is Bonitas, Disciplina, Scientia (Latin) (Goodness, Discipline, and Knowledge). As of February 2014, the school is currently ranked the number 1 (the best) high school in Nigeria, and 36th in the top 100 best secondary schools in Africa. The school's colours are White and Royal Blue. The college has active alumni associations in Nigeria (Abuja, Benin-City, Enugu, Lagos, Onitsha, Owerri, and Port-Harcourt), and in the United States ("Christ the King College Onitsha Alumni Association USA").

=== School population ===
Throughout the years prior to the civil war, the school's population was pegged at 600 to ensure appropriate student/teacher ratio and high-quality education. After the civil war, in the 1970s, the student population ballooned to over 4,000. However, following years of reorganization, the school's student population is now 2,597, split between (Grades 7- 12); Junior Secondary School (1,350) and Senior Secondary School (1,247).

== Sporting and extra-curricular activities ==
The school plays association football, track and field athletics, handball, hockey and lawn tennis. Its football (soccer) team won the World Secondary School Championship in Dublin, Ireland in 1977.

== Houses ==
The dormitories are classified as school houses for administration, management and sports competition purposes. The current houses are: Tagbo, Brolly, Azikiwe, Heerey, Okagbue, Modebe, Arinze, Aniogu, Mbanefo, Orjiakor, Allagoa, Butler, and Flanagan.

The pre-civil war Houses were: St. Charles, St. Gabriel, St Williams, St Michael's, and St. Joseph.

== School publications ==
- The X-Ray (Students)
- Bonitas (Students)
- The Amaka Gazette (Alumni)
- Amaka's Voice (Alumni)

== List of principals ==
- 1st Rev Fr. W.L. Brolly: 1933–1937
- 2nd Rev. Fr. M Flanagan: 1938–1941
- 3rd Rev. Fr J. Keane: 1942–1943
- 4th Rev. Fr. A. Callaghan: 1943
- 5th Rev. Fr. M. Flanagan: 1943–1948
- 6th Rev. Fr. M. Clifford: 1949–1953
- 7th Rev. Fr. W Butler: 1953–1954
- 8th Rev. Fr. J. Keane: 1955–1956
- 9th Rev. Fr. J. FitzPatrick: 1956–1963
- 10th Rev. Fr. Nicholas Tagbo: 1963–1972 (First indigenous principal)
- 11th Chief A.A.O. Ezenwa: 1973–1974
- 12th Rev. H. Chiwuzie: 1974–1975
- 13th Mr. P. E. Ezeokeke: 1975–1976
- 14th Rev. Fr. N.C. Tagbo: 1976–1985
- 15th Mr. M. N. Enemou: 1985–1987
- 16th Rev. Dr. V. A. Nwosu: 1987–1996
- 17th Mr. J.E. Chukwurah: 1996–1997
- 18th Mr. E. C. Umeh: 1997–2000
- 19th Chief N. E. Olisah: 2000–2008
- 20th Chief A. Obika: 2008–2009
- 21st Mr. E. Ezenduka: 2009–2010
- 22nd Rev. Fr. Charles Okwumuo: 2010–2019
- 23rd Rev. Fr. Dr. Celestine Arinze Okafor: 2019–present

Source: Honor Roll of CKC Principals, 1993–2011

== Notable alumni ==
- Olisa Agbakoba (b 29 May 1953) lawyer, former president of Nigeria Bar Association, NBA, and human rights activist.
- Justice Anthony Aniagolu, justice of the supreme court of Nigeria and chairman of the 1988–89 Constituent Assembly
- Justice Chukwunweike Idigbe, Justice of the Supreme Court of Nigeria
- Chike Francis Ofodile, OFR (November 20, 1924 - August 3, 2014) former Attorney General and the Minister for Justice of Nigeria from (1985 - 1991) and former Judge of the International Court of Justice from (1984 - 1985). He was once the traditional Prime Minister of Onitsha
- Gov. Peter Obi (b 19 July 1961) Former governor of Anambra State
- Gov. Willie Obiano (b 8 August 1955) Former Governor of Anambra State.
- Archbishop Valerian M. Okeke (b 20 October 1953) Archbishop of the Archdiocese of Onitsha since 1 September 2003
- Dr. Pius N.C. Okigbo (6 February 1924 – 2000) economist from Ojoto
- John Munonye (April 1929 – 10 May 1999), one of the most prolific Nigerian literary writers of the 20th century, and author of The Only Son (African Writers Series) among many others.
- Justice Chukwudifu Akunne Oputa (22 September 1924 - 5 May 2014) (retired Justice of the Supreme Court of Nigeria), former Chairman of the Human Rights Violation and Investigation Commission (popularly called Oputa Panel)
- Prof. Patrick Utomi (b 6 February 1956) Founder Lagos Business School, African Democratic Congress presidential candidate (2007)
- Ezeolisa Allagoa (24 August 1914 – 17 February 2003) was traditional ruler of Nembe Kingdom
- Dr. Peter Odili (15 August 1948) Former Executive Governor of Rivers State (1999-2007)
- Ezeolisa Allagoa 1st Indigenous Chief Judge of Old Rivers State and Amanyanabo of Nembe
- Mr Oseloka H. Obaze, (b 9 April 1955) Diplomat, politician and author.
- Justice Peter N. C Umeadi, (b 4 July 1955), Jurist, Chief Judge of Anambra State.
- Arc. Frank Nwobuora MBANEFO, (1927-2015), Class of 1948, (http://www.ckconitshausa.net/uploads/Ode_to_Arc_Mbanefo.pdf) renown international Architect and one of the founding members of the Nigerian Institute of Architects, of which he later became a Fellow and National President. He helped set-up the science and geography lab in CKC in 1948 and was the science tutor, before heading to England in 1950 to study architecture. He was member of the RIBA (Royal Institute of British Architects) and two-time Vice President - AFRICA of the CAA (Commonwealth Association of Architects) in 1963-1965, 1974-1977. He was an influential past national president of the CKC Alumni and worked closely with Principal Fr. Tagbo in improving CKC after the Biafran War.
