= Edmund Daukoru =

Nigerian politician

Edmund Maduabebe Daukoru
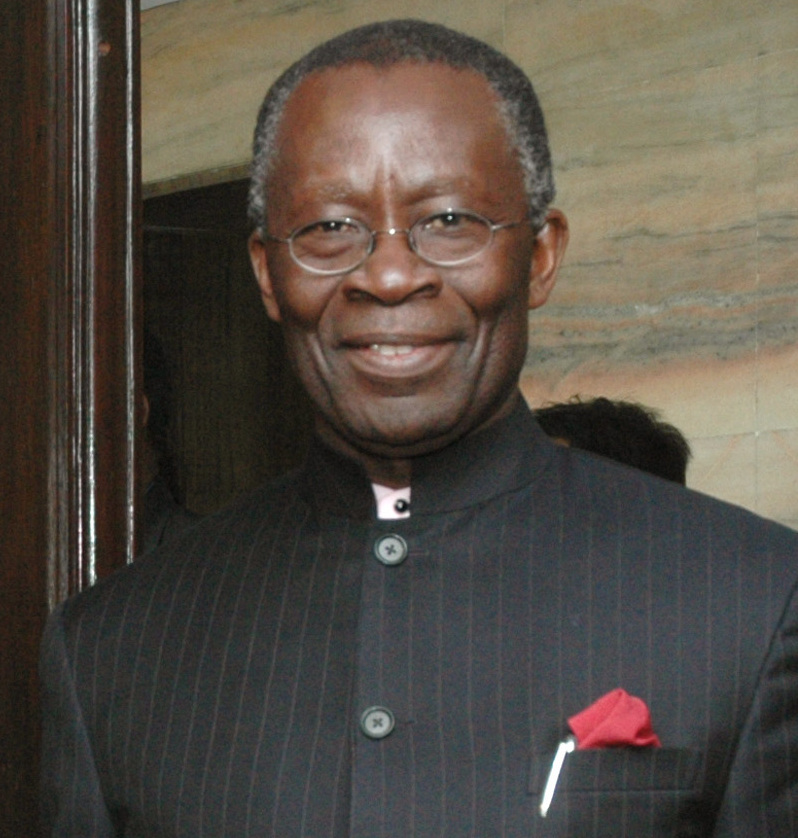
- Daukoru in 2007

Amayanabo of Nembe
- Incumbent
- Assumed office 23 February 2008
- Preceded by: Kien Ambrose Ezeolisa Alagoa, Mingi XI

Minister of Petroleum Resources
- In office May 2007 – 18 December 2008
- Preceded by: Olusegun Obasanjo
- Succeeded by: Rilwanu Lukman

26th Secretary General of OPEC
- In office 1 January 2006 – 31 December 2006
- Preceded by: Ahmed Al-Fahad Al-Ahmed Al-Sabah
- Succeeded by: Abdallah Salem el-Badri

Minister of State for Energy
- In office July 2005 – May 2007

Personal details
- Born: 13 October 1943 (age 82)

Edmund Maduabebe Daukoru (born 13 October 1943) is a former Nigerian Minister of State for Energy and was Secretary General of the Organization of the Petroleum Exporting Countries (OPEC) in 2006. He became the Amayanabo, or traditional ruler, of Nembe Kingdom in 2008. Also Chairman of South South Monarchs forum in the PGEJ regime.

== Background ==
Daukoru was born on 13 October 1943 in the oil-rich Bayelsa State.

He obtained a Ph.D. in Geology from Imperial College London. He was employed by Shell International Petroleum Company from 1970, where he rose from Chief Geologist to General Manager of Exploration in Nigeria.

In 1992, he became Group Managing Director of the Nigerian National Petroleum Corporation.

== Political career ==
In 2003, Daukoru became Presidential Advisor on Petroleum and Energy, and in July 2005 was appointed Minister of State for Energy in the cabinet of President Olusegun Obasanjo.

He was appointed Secretary General of OPEC on 1 January 2006 for a one-year term.

== Traditional ruler ==
Daukoru was appointed the Amayanabo, or traditional ruler of Nembe Kingdom in Bayelsa state, taking the name Mingi XIII.

Rivalries between the Bassambiri and Ogbolomabiri communities of the old Nembe Kingdom date back over 200 years.

In April 2010 the Bayelsa State government attempted once more to resolve these issues, bringing together Daukoru with Ralph Iwowari, Amanyanabo of Nembe Bassambiri, and other chiefs to find a solution.

After the meeting both kings said they were optimistic that the differences between the two feuding communities could be resolved.

In August 2010 Daukoru's palace was attacked by armed youths in speedboats who tied up the guards, stole the traditional regalia and destroyed the palace.
