= Enclaves of Forcados and Badjibo =

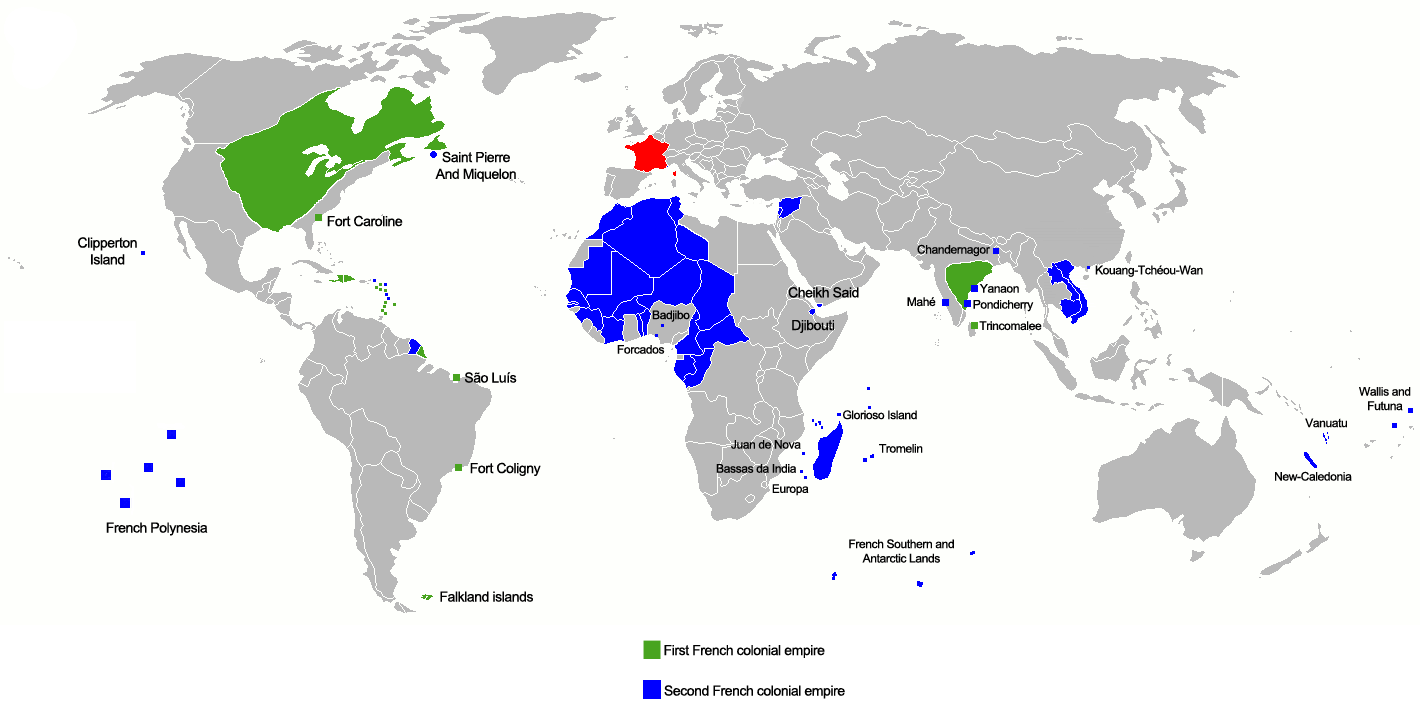
Map of the French colonial empire, showing Forcados and Badjibo in Nigeria

The enclaves of Forcados and Badjibo were two territories close to the river Niger, in modern Nigeria, leased to France by the United Kingdom under the Anglo-French Convention of 1898. They were obtained by France after several expeditions along the Niger, by Hourst (1894), Granderye (1898–99), Toutée (1895 and 1899-1900), and Lenfant (1901–02, etc.). France wanted to determine whether its colonies in French Sudan could more easily be supplied upstream along the Niger rather than via the traditional Dakar route.

== Terms of the lease ==
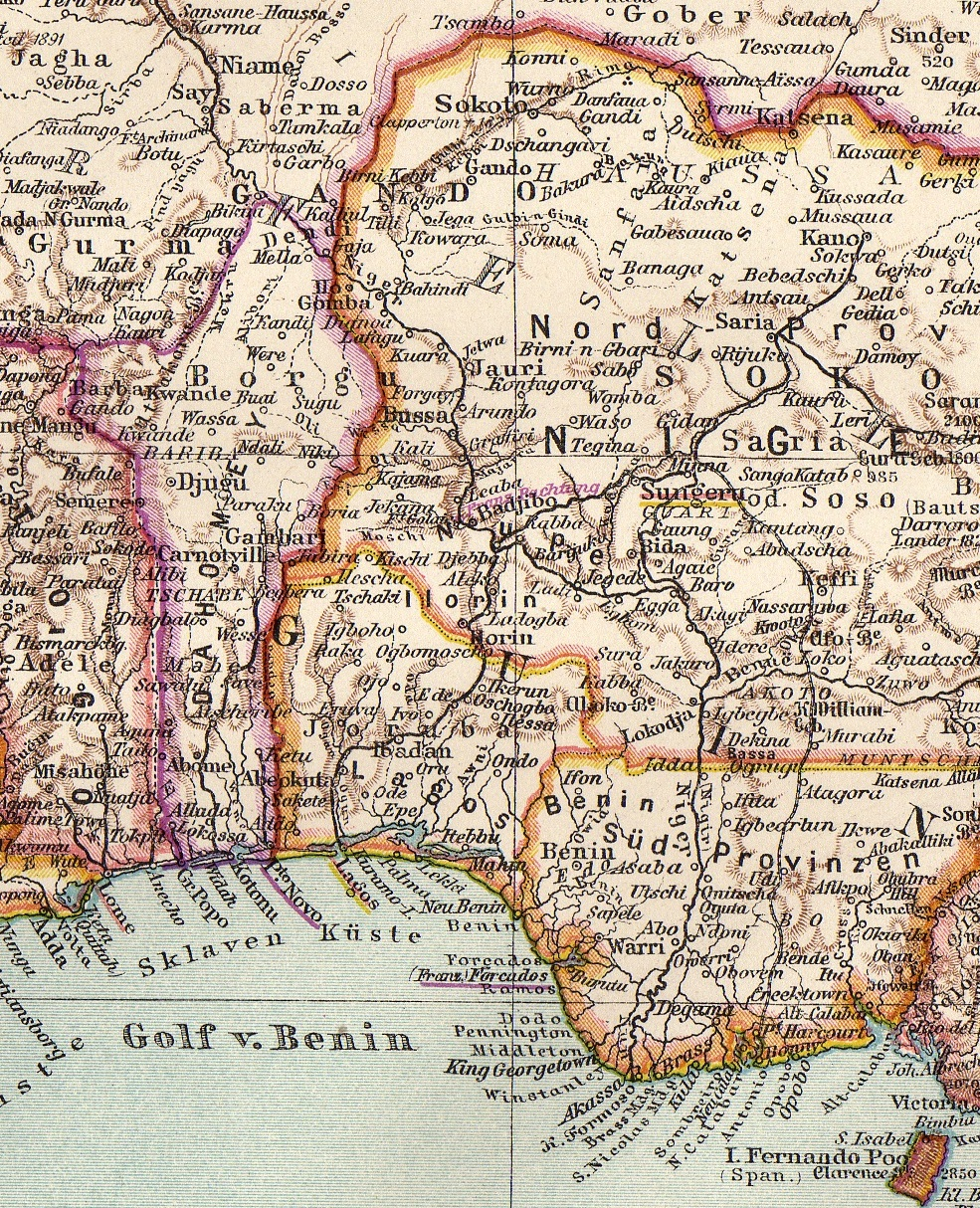
1907 German map showing Forcados (underlined) and Badjibo

Lease terms were determined by agreements signed on 20 May 1903 giving effect to article 8 of the convention of 14 June 1898 by the French Foreign Minister Théophile Delcassé, and Sir Edmund Monson, British Ambassador to France. The agreement was reached in the context of the Entente cordiale between the two countries, ending a period of tension and competition over territories in Africa, and based on the principle of freedom of navigation along the length of the Niger.

Each leased territory amounted to approximately 47 hectares (less than 0.2 square miles) and was designated for the unloading, storing and transshipping of goods, with residents confined to staff employed for these purposes together with their families and servants. The lease was for a renewable period of thirty years in each case, and included conditions such as a requirement to enclose the area and to forbid retail trading. The annual rent was set at one franc per year.

The enclaves were mentioned in French textbooks in 1926 and described as unoccupied in 1929. The leases were not renewed at the end of the initial thirty-year period.

== Forcados ==
The name 'Forcados' (meaning 'forked') was given to the area by the first Portuguese slave traders to explore the Niger delta in the current Bayelsa State. The leased area was trapezoid in shape, with the short side on the estuary of the Forcados River near the village of Gula, opposite Ogidiba, and stretching back 700m from the water's edge. Although not signed until 1903, the lease was deemed to run for thirty years from 28 June 1900 and the leased area remained under the law then in force in the British Southern Nigeria Protectorate.

== Badjibo ==
The Badjibo enclave (not to be confused with the place of the same name in Gabon) was located at the confluence of the Niger with the much smaller Doko, about 36 km upstream from Jebba and downstream from the Boussa rapids where Mungo Park died. It consisted of a parcel of land in the shape of a parallelogram, with a waterfront of 400m and a depth of 200m, opposite the village of Badjibo. It was next to Fort Arenberg, founded in 1895 by Georges Joseph Toutée and named in honour of Auguste d'Arenberg before being abandoned. For this reason it is sometimes referred to as the Arenberg enclave. Though not signed until 1903, the lease was deemed to have taken effect on 5 June 1900 and the enclave remained under the law then in force under the British Northern Nigeria Protectorate.

== See also ==
- Colonial Nigeria
- List of French possessions and colonies
- Niger River
- French West Africa
- Scramble for Africa

== Bibliography ==
- Lupton, Kenneth, ‘The Partitioning of Borgu in 1898 and the French Enclaves in Nigeria, 1900-1960’, Journal of the Historical Society of Nigeria, 12.3–4 (1984), 77–94.
