= Forçados =

Town in Buruntu, Delta State, Nigeria

Forcados Forçados
- Location within Nigeria
- Coordinates: 5°35′57″N 5°34′59″E
- Town: Nigeria

Area
  - Total: 6.02 km^{2} (2.32 sq mi)

Population
  - Estimate (2016): 2,000

Forçados is a small town in Burutu LGA of Delta State, Nigeria. It is most noted for the Forcados River, which is a major navigable channel of the Niger Delta. The river starts about 20 miles (32 km) downstream from Aboh and flows through zones of freshwater swamps, swamps, and coastal sand ridges before completing its 198-kilometre (123 mi) course to the Bight of Benin.

History reveals that Forçados and neighbouring Burutu played a significant role in slave trade era. The Portuguese built a slave dungeon in 1475, where slaves were kept before being exported to Europe and America. The Forçados slave wharf is one of the longest in Africa; it was built by the Portuguese in 1472, and renovated by Royal Niger Company in 1886 when they took over the town. The Royal Niger Company built a prison in 1887 and it was the first in West Africa. The famous Forçados sea wall was built in 1616, also by the Portuguese, to protect their houses from flooding. The Portuguese also built a windmill in 1472. The abandoned Burutu sea port was built by the Royal Niger Company in 1887; it was the first modern sea port in Africa.

The Forçados Infectious Diseases General Hospital, built in 1890, was the first in Nigeria and West Africa. Newly trained medical personnel from abroad began their first medical work in Forçados. The hospital still functions partially, renovated by Delta State government.

All the structures discussed are just a few of those built by the Portuguese and the British, who settled in Forçados and Burutu to do business. The structures discussed above and many more are still visible, but are fast decaying due to lack of maintenance by the government.

Forçados was the administrative headquarters that hosted the Portuguese, and played a vital role in the colonial era in Nigeria. The community today has a total human population of approximately 2000 inhabitants, predominantly Ijaws, with fishing as their main source of livelihood.

== See also ==
- Forcados River
- Enclaves of Forcados and Badjibo
