= Anthony Aniagolu =

Nigerian judge

Justice of the Supreme Court of Nigeria
- In office January, 1978 – October 1987
- Nominated by: Olusegun Obasanjo

Personal details
- Born: October 22, 1922 Udi LGA
- Died: June 28, 2011 (aged 88)
- Education: University of Bristol

Anthony Aniagolu was a Nigerian judge who served as Chief Judge of Anambra State from 1976 to 1978 and was a justice of the Nigerian Supreme Court from 1978 to 1987. In 1988, he chaired a Constituent Assembly to propose a draft constitution for Nigeria's Third Republic.

== Life ==
Aniagolu was born in Eke to the family of Aniagolu and Monica Onwusi, his father was a farmer; his uncle was Onyeama Onwusi, the Warrant Chief of Eke, and he was a cousin of Charles Onyeama, a judge of the World Court. His father died when he was young, and he was briefly supported by his uncle until the latter's death in 1933. Aniagolu attended two primary schools in Eke and Udi and then, he was awarded a scholarship to study at Government College, Umuahia; he finished in secondary education at Christ the King College, Onitsha. After completing his education in Onithsa, he was a briefly a teacher at his alma mater and also completed an intermediate law program as an external student. From 1948-1952, he studied at the University of Bristol where he earned his law degree. Thereafter, he established a law practice in Enugu until 1965 when he became a judge of the High Court of Eastern Nigeria.

While practicing law in Enugu, he was a member of the Federal Electoral Commission of Nigeria from 1958 to 1965. In 1963, he became the chairman of Eastern Nigeria Festival of Arts Committee.

In 1975, he was made acting Chief Judge of the East Central State and on the creation of Anambra State in 1976, he became the state's first Chief Judge. He was nominated to become a justice of the Nigerian Supreme Court in 1978.
