= Ezeolisa Allagoa =

Ambrose Ezeolisa Allagoa
- His Majesty
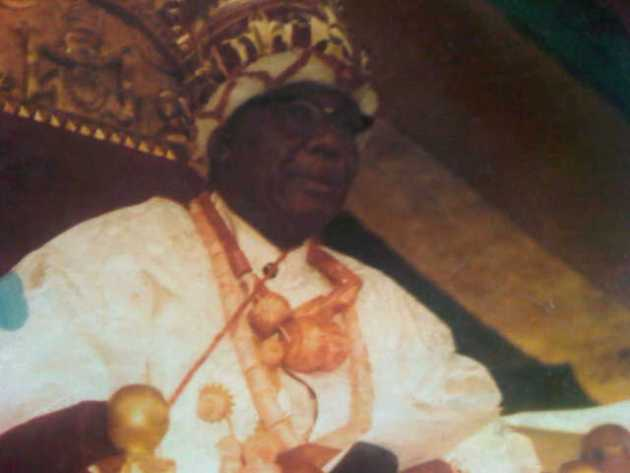
- Ezeolisa Allagoa at his coronation
- Reign: 12 April 1980 – 17 February 2003
- Predecessor: Francis Ossomade Joseph Allagoa (Mingi X)
- Born: 24 August 1914
- Died: 17 February 2003 (aged 88)
- Spouse: Francisca Ngozi Allagoa
- House: Amain-Kien-Allagoa-Koki
- Father: His Royal Majesty Francis Ossomade Joseph Allagoa
- Mother: Madam Nwaokiri Rose Onyeka

His Majesty Ambrose Ezeolisa Allagoa (24 August 1914 – 17 February 2003) was King of Nembe Kingdom from 1980 until his death. Additionally, he has a blood relationship with the royal family of Ossomari through his grandmother Omu Okwei (the merchant queen of Onitsha). He succeeded his father His Royal Majesty Francis Ossomade Joseph Allagoa (Mingi X) Amanyanabo of Nembe on 12 April 1980, being styled His Royal Majesty Ambrose Ezeolisa Allagoa Mingi XI Amanyanabo of Nembe-Ibe Kingdom

== Early life ==
Ambrose Ezeolisa Allagoa MINGI XI was born on 24 August 1914, the second son of His Royal Majesty King Francis Ossomade Joseph Allagoa MINGI X and Madam Nwaokiri Rose Onyeka. He was educated at the Government School Owerri in 1927; the St Mary's Primary School in Port Harcourt (1927–32), and a pioneer student of Christ the King College, Onitsha (1933–36). He joined the Lincoln's Inn in November 1944 and was subsequently called to the English bar on 26 January 1950.

== Political career ==
After successfully being called to the English Bar in 1950, he returned to the city of Port Harcourt in the old eastern Region of Nigeria where the independence movement was growing. He served as Deputy Mayor of Port Harcourt Municipal Council between 1951 and 59, when he was elected as the 2nd Mayor of Port Harcourt Municipal Council taking over from Mayor Richard Okwosha Nzimiro in 1959. He served in this capacity for three years, giving the city of Port Harcourt the name Garden City.

He served his tenure as mayor of Port Harcourt where he invited the Prime Minister of Nigeria Sir Alhaji Tafawa Balewa and the Premier of the Eastern Region, Chief Michael Okpara to the city of Port Harcourt.

== Working career ==
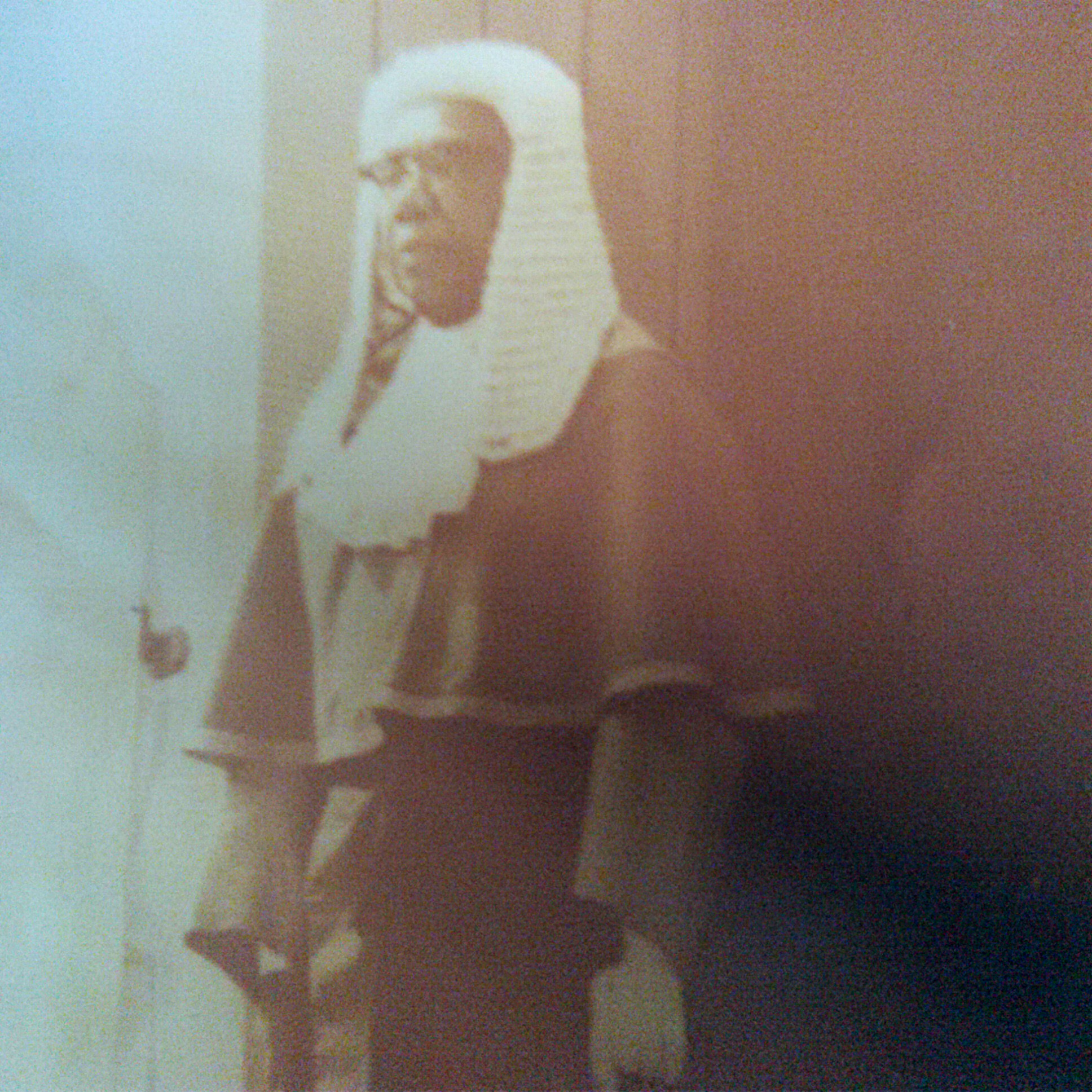

Upon completion of his secondary school education at Christ the King College, Onitsha, young Ambrose successfully sat for and made distinctions in his senior Cambridge Certificate exam and was subsequently employed in the Civil Service of the then Eastern Region of Nigeria where he worked as a clerk in the judiciary of the Eastern Region government for a few years. He gained a lot of exposure and experience which were vital in his life. His working career took him to Lagos, Enugu and Port Harcourt where he served diligently as a clerk of court before proceeding to the Lincoln's Inn for his qualification as a lawyer.

On his return from England as a lawyer, he commenced his legal practice, setting up his Law firm in the oil rich city of Port Harcourt, Nigeria. He had a successful career in the legal profession and this won him the respect and admiration of many lawyers. He was elevated to the bench as a High Court Judge in 1962 by the then Eastern Region of Nigeria Government where he served as a Judge of the Eastern Region in cities like Abakaliki, Nsukka, Ikot Ekpene, Umuahia, and Port Harcourt. In 1976, he was appointed the first indigenous Chief Judge of Old Rivers State in 1976. And the second Chief Judge of Rivers state. He retired three years later on 24 September 1979, having attained the requisite retirement age of 65 years. He is mostly remembered for his judgement in the case Amakiri v. Iwowari.

== Religion ==
His maternal great grandfather (King Atamanya- Nzedegwu of Ossomari) invited Roman Catholic priests into his Ossomari Kingdom and the young Ambrose growing up in Ossomari became an adherent catholic faithful. His Majesty Ambrose Ezeolisa Allagoa was a devout Catholic; he fully identified with the objectives of the Roman Catholic Church and was a worthy knight of the Roman Catholic Church.

According to an oration presented by The Order Of the Knights of Saint Mulumba, KSM, Port Harcourt in honor of His Majesty the King:

"We recall the crucial role he played as a Catholic in post-war Rivers state. At the end of the civil war, Catholics generally were haunted in Rivers state. In spite of this unwholesome phenomenon, he not only stood firm in the Catholic Church, but also participated and supported the persecuted clergy. He assisted the Catholic Church immensely in identifying and recovering some of her properties at the end of the war in Rivers state. His full participation during Corpus Christi procession, in spite of acute challenges of age, epitomized his commitment to the Catholic faith."

== Reign ==
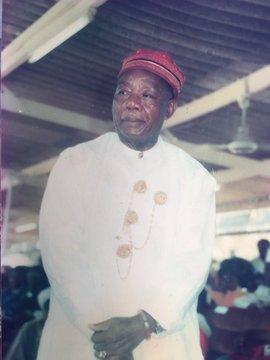

His Majesty Ambrose Ezeolisa Allagoa was crowned king on 12 April 1980 in succession to his father and as Mingi XI he reigned for 23 years. Upon the creation of Bayelsa state out of the old River state in 1996, he contributed immensely to the success of the newly created state. His Majesty was the Chairman of the Traditional Rulers Council both in Rivers State and in Bayelsa State where he moved to restore peace among the coastal communities.

=== Titles ===
Monarchical style of King Ambrose Allagoa Amanyanabo of Nembe, Mingi the 11th

- Reference style: His Majesty
- Spoken style: Your Majesty
- Alternative style: Mingi XI

== Honours ==
- Commander of the Order of the Niger, CON in 1978
- Grand Knight of Saint Sylvester conferred on him by Pope Paul VI in 1977
- Knight of St. Gregory conferred on him by Pope John XXIII in 1978
- Honorary Citizen of Maryland, USA conferred on him by Governor Preston Smith in 1972
- Pro-Chancellor, University of Ilorin 1978
- Pro-Chancellor, University of Sokoto 1982-83,
- Chancellor, Federal University of Technology, Owerri 1985-2000.

== Sources ==
- Ebiegberi Joe-Allagoa: Genealogy of His Majesty Justice Ambrose Ezeolisa Allagoa, MINGI XI Amanyanabo of Nembe (c) 2006
- Funeral Oration Presented by The Order Of The Knights Of Saint Mulumba, KSM, Port Harcourt (c) 2006
- Robert Nabena: The Royal Root Of His Royal Majesty Francis Ossomade Joseph Allagoa MINGI X Amanyanabo of Nembe. A Historical *Perspective: The Culture, Tradition, Monuments And Economic Life Of The Nembe People. (c) 2014
- Robert Nabena: Break Off The Limits (c) 2013, Green And Cherished Limited.
- Robert Nabena: LIFE & TIMES OF HRM AMBROSE E. ALLAGOA
- Ebiegberi Joe Alagoa: Kaliye Opuye, Opuye Kaliye 2018.
