= Carmel Moravian Church =

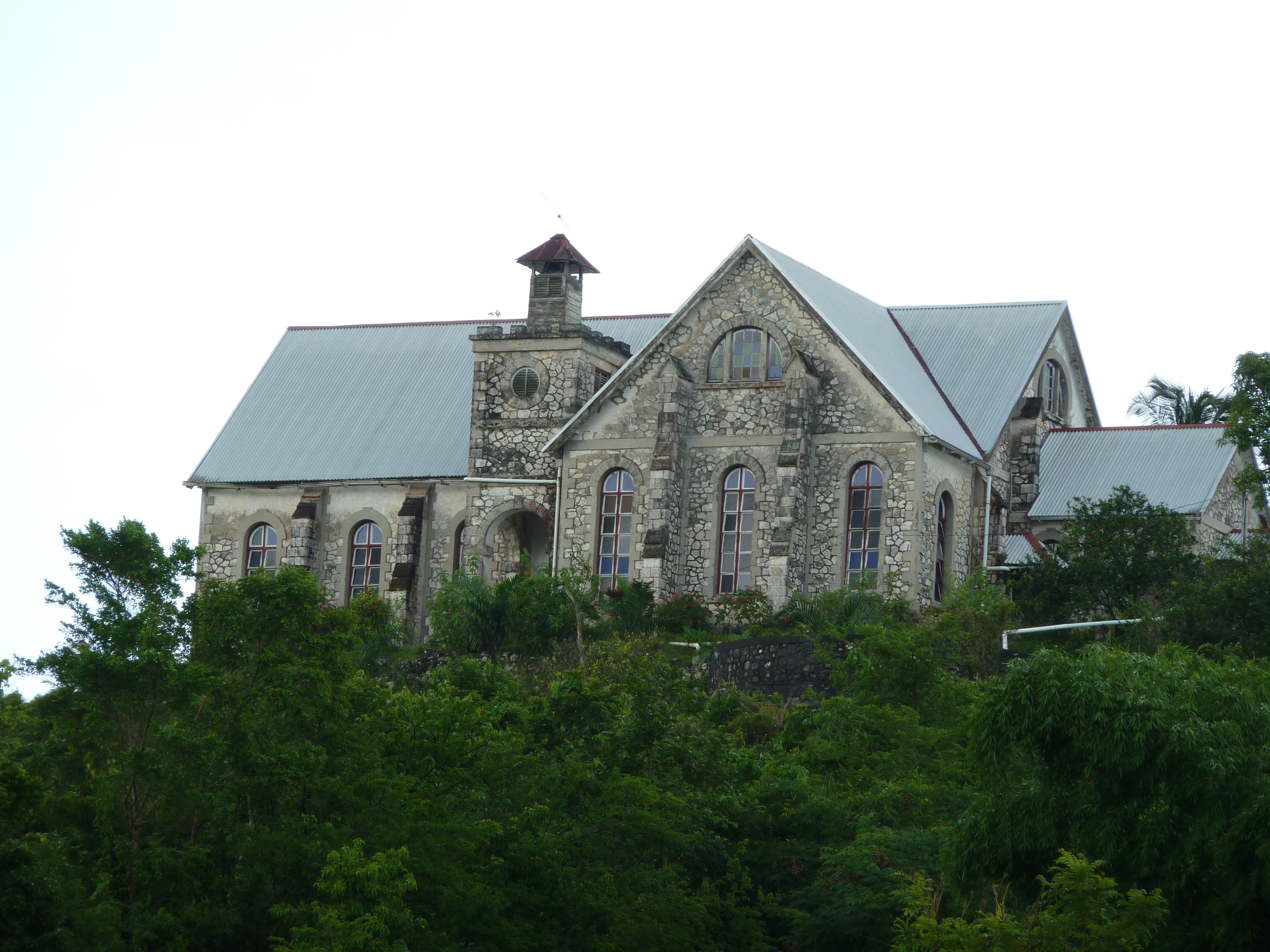
- Carmel Moravian Church c2010.

- Location within Jamaica
- 18.1642°N 77.9379°W
- Location: Westmoreland
- Country: Jamaica
- Denomination: Moravian

History
- Status: Church
- Founded: 1827
- Founder(s): Mr and Mrs Hutchinson Muir Scott

Architecture
- Functional status: Active
- Completed: 1826 temporary 1828 original 1859 enlarged

Specifications
- Length: 120 ft (37 m)
- Width: 73 ft (22 m)

Administration
- District: Western
- Province: Jamaica Province of the Moravian Church

Clergy
- Bishop: Stanley George Clarke

Carmel Moravian Church sits dramatically atop a hill 1.5 miles (2.4 km) west of the small market town of Newmarket in Westmoreland, Jamaica. It was founded in 1827 at the behest of a local family of planters who wished to teach Christianity to their slaves.

== History ==
Planters Mr. and Mrs. Hutchinson Muir Scott owned properties in the area and starting in 1818 made several attempts to find a Christian minister for their slaves.

Eventually, c1820, they invited Moravian missionaries to begin regular services on their estates.

A hill top site was chosen by the Scotts in 1826 and a road built up to the temporary building they had constructed there.

John Scholefield was appointed as the first minister of Carmel in 1827 and oversaw work on a new church which started the same year and was completed in 1828. It was soon found to be too small and as a result services had to be held both morning and evening to satisfy the demand. The church was enlarged in 1859 resulting in the magnificent building, 120 feet (37 m) long and 72 feet (22 m) wide at the transept, which still stands today.

== Buildings ==
=== Church ===
A cut stone and mortar structure with a large masonry belfry to the south topped by a wooden cupola and containing one bell.

A pipe organ was obtained from Germany circa 1895.

=== Manse ===
A 20th-century building of rendered breeze blocks with a zinc roof. Rain water was channeled by gutters from the roof to a large storage tank to the south of the building from where it was daily pumped by hand into a header tank of old oil drums and gravity fed to taps.

=== School ===
There is a Primary and infant school a little downhill to the west of the church, opposite the main entrance.

== Burial ground ==
Running downhill to the north of the church is a small and sparsely used God's Acre of about 1,700m^{2}.

== Ministers ==
1827-??	John Scholefield
...	
1903-17	G.H. Lopp
1917-34	Fredrick Weiss
1934-44	C.F. Smith
1944-47	H.T. Cuthbert
1947-49	Robert Burd
1949-55	John Berry
1956-63	H. Ashton-Smith
1963-70	John McOwat
1970-72	Desmond Quaite
1972-74	Michael Smith
1974-76	Geoffrey Tate
1976-79	Orville Neil
1979-86	Clinton Robinson
1987-94	Levi Watson
1994-2001	Desna Goulbourne
2001-2006	Devon Anglin
2006- 2012	Reginald Seymour
2013- 2024	Christopher Euphfa

== Notable members ==
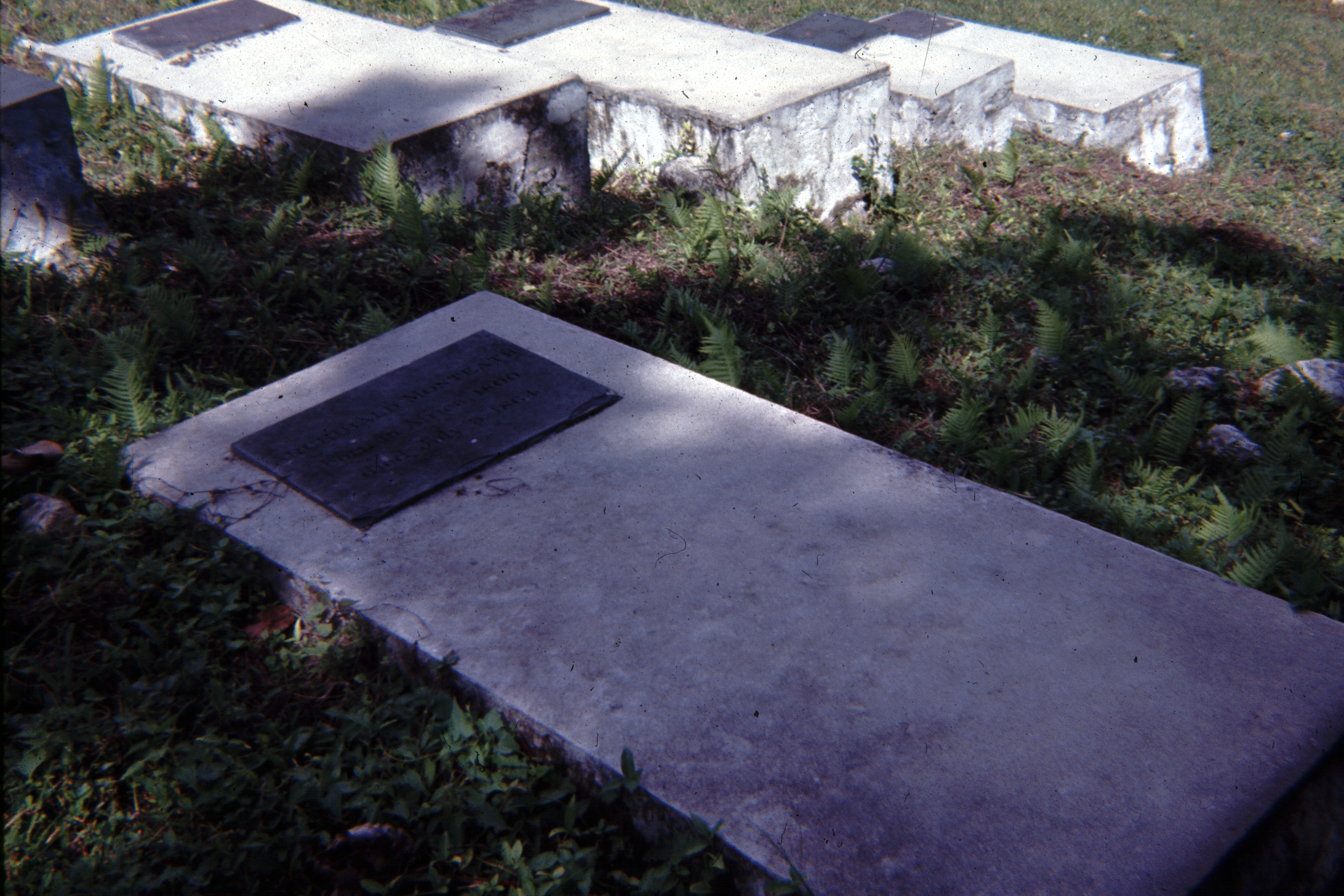
Archibald Monteith's grave.

- Archibald Monteith, an ex-slave who was called 'Aneaso' born in Africa, and brought to Jamaica and later wrote an autobiography.

== Bibliography ==
- Hastings, S U & MacLeavy, B L (1979), Seedtime and Harvest (A Brief History of the Moravian Church in Jamaica 1754-1979), The Moravian Church Corporation
