= Odioma =

Odioama Ibeawo
- Location in Nigeria
- Coordinates: 4°20′N 6°26′E
- Country: Nigeria
- State: Bayelsa State

Odioama is an ancient community located in Brass Local Government Area Bayelsa State, one of major Nembe speaking community in Bayelsa. Nigeria, in an area where oil was found by Shell Nigeria. It was largely destroyed in February 2005, when soldiers burned buildings, killed perhaps 17 villagers and raped women, ostensibly in revenge for previous killings by local rebels led by one militant leader Mr. Kitikata who killed a team of local government counselors and security operatives on a peace keeping mission The underlying cause was apparently a dispute by the nearby community of Nembe Bassambiri over who would receive payments from the oil extraction.
