= Forçados River =

River in Nigeria

Coordinates: 5°18′30″N 6°25′0″E

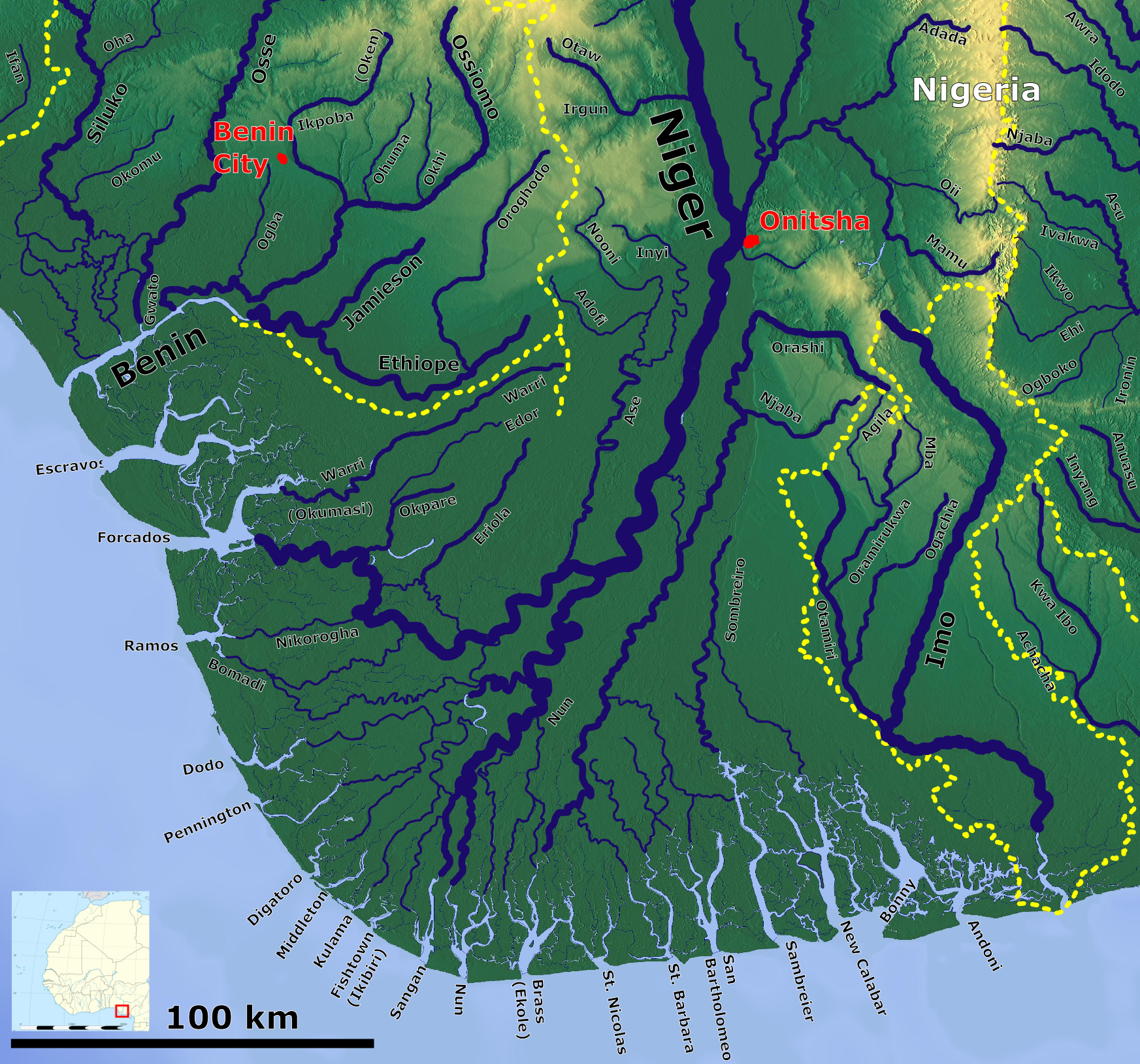
The Niger Delta with the Forcados (middle left).

A video showing the Forçados River near Burutu, Delta State, Nigeria. The clip captures the natural river environment, water flow, and surrounding vegetation in the Niger Delta region.

The Forçados River (originally Forcados) is a channel in the Niger Delta, in southern Nigeria. It flows for approximately 198 kilometres (123 mi) and meets the sea at the Bight of Benin in Delta State. It is an important channel for small ships. The Forçados River splits from the Niger River at Toru-Abubou near Agbere Town in Sagbama Local Government Area of Bayelsa State, the same point as the Nun River.

People have been fishing on this river for years and then came to a dock on the Niger River to sell/store and use for personal consumption.

In the early years of the 20th century, Forçados was a destination port for steamers from England until the river silted up.

A large hoard of bronze artefacts (1 armlet, 7 bells, 3 bracelets, 1 knife and 3 manillas) from the Forçados River can be found in the British Museum's collection.

== Pollution ==
The majority of the rivers in Niger Delta region including Forçados River, experience and suffer pollution, the region had been an extraction for crude oil for more than 3 decades. Extraction of fossil fuels causes damages leading to excess air, water and soil pollution which are hazardous to the residents health. The location of Forcados River had been a passage for several oil companies in Niger Delta region for conveying crude oil which in return causes water pollution, killing and chasing the aquatic lives in the which the fishermen of the region survives on, and causes degradation of the environment

== Flood ==
Flooding of the Forçados River causes degradation in the area it is located, forcing residents to evacuate while flooding continue to destroy their properties and belongings, it also led to the set back in the agricultural sector where farmers were forced to harvest their farm products prematurely.

== See also ==
- Forcados
- Enclaves of Forcados and Badjibo
- https://m.wikidata.org/wiki/Q503509
