= Frederick William Koko Mingi VIII of Nembe =

King of Nembe (1853–1898)

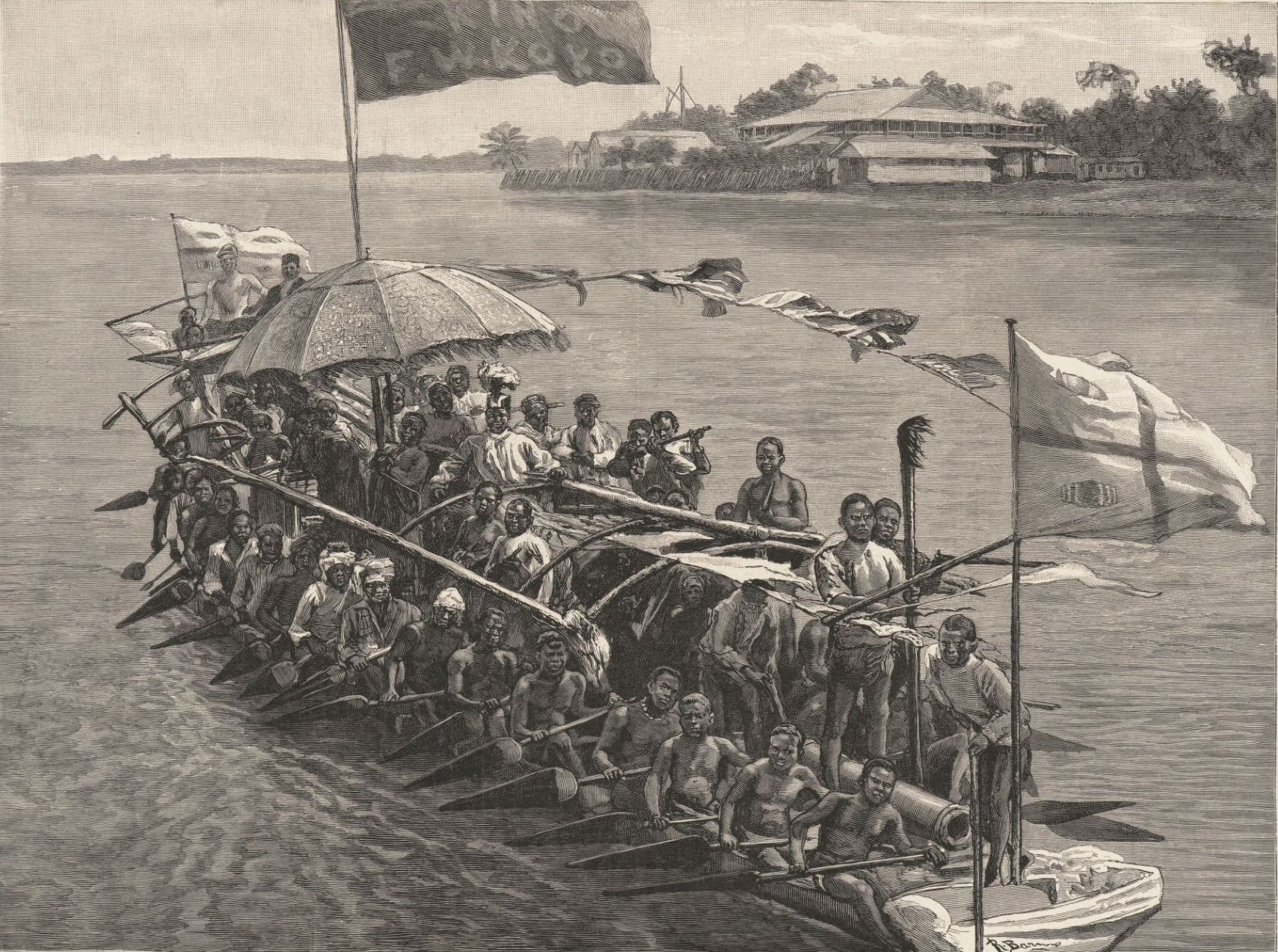
King Koko in His War Canoe on His Way down the River, from The Daily Graphic of March 30, 1895

King Frederick William Koko, Mingi VIII of Nembe (1853–1898), known as King Koko and King William Koko, was an African ruler of the Nembe Kingdom (also known as Nembe-Brass) in the Niger Delta, now part of southern Nigeria.

A Christian when chosen as king of Nembe in 1889, Koko's attack on a Royal Niger Company trading post in January 1895 led to a retaliatory raid by the British in which his capital was sacked. Following a report on the Nembe uprising by Sir John Kirk which was published in 1896, finding that 43 of Koko's hostages had been murdered and ceremoniously eaten, Koko was offered a settlement of his grievances but found the terms unacceptable, so was deposed by the British. He died in exile in 1898.

== Life ==
An Ijaw, Koko was a convert to Christianity who later returned to the local traditional religion. Before becoming king (amanyanabo), he had served as a Christian schoolteacher, and in 1889 this helped him in his rise to power. The leading chiefs of Nembe, including Spiff, Samuel Sambo, and Cameroon, were all Christians, and after having ordered the destruction of Juju houses a large part of their reason for choosing Koko as king in succession to King Ockiya was that he was a fellow-Christian. However, there was at the same time a coparcenary king, the elderly Ebifa, who ruled at Bassambiri and was Commander-in-Chief until his death in 1894.

With the settlement of European traders on the coast, Nembe had engaged in trade with them, but it was poorer than its neighbours Bonny and Calabar. Since 1884, Nembe had found itself included in the area declared by the British as the Oil Rivers Protectorate, within which they claimed control of military defence and external affairs. Nembe was the centre of an important trade in palm oil, and it had refused to sign a treaty proposed by the British, opposing the Royal Niger Company's aim of bringing all trade along the kingdom's rivers into its own hands.

=== Akassa raid ===
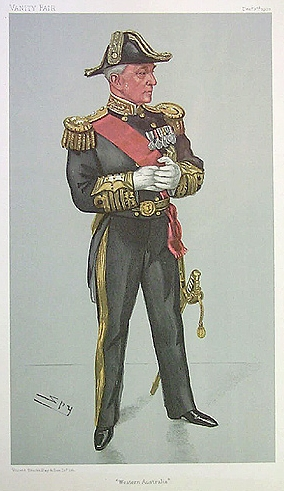
Admiral Bedford, who routed Koko's forces in 1895

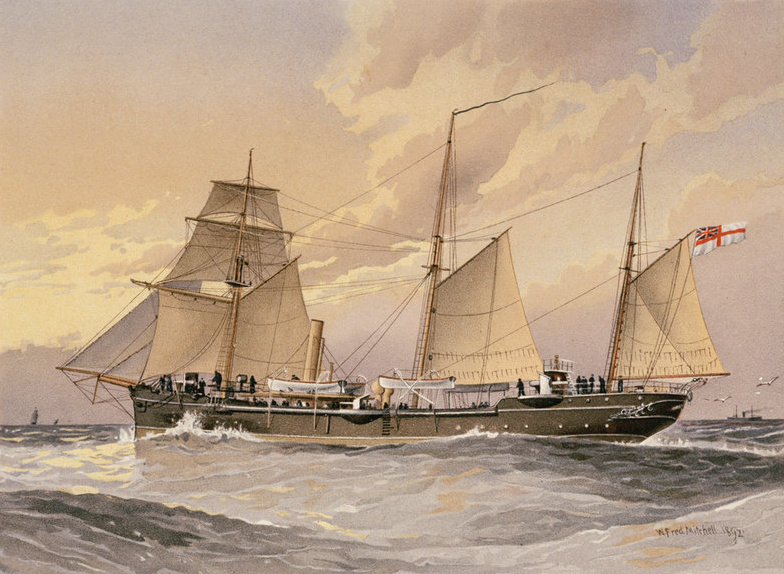
HMS Thrush

By the 1890s, there was intense resentment of the Company's treatment of the people of the Niger delta and of its aggressive actions to exclude its competitors and to monopolise trade, denying the men of Nembe the access to markets which they had long enjoyed. As king, Koko aimed to resist these pressures and tried to strengthen his hand by forming alliances with the states of Bonny and Okpoma. He renounced Christianity and in January 1895, after the death of Ebifa, he threw caution to the winds and led more than a thousand men in a dawn raid on the Royal Niger Company's headquarters at Akassa. Arriving on 29 January with 22 war canoes and 1,500 foot soldiers from different parts of the Ijo nation to attack the RNC depot in Akassa. They destroyed the warehouses and offices, vandalised official and industrial machines, and burnt down the entire depot. While about 70 men were said to have been captured, 25 were killed, and 32 white men were taken hostage as part of the spoils of war to Nembe and 13 were not accounted for. Many of the white men were later executed in cold blood at the "Sacrifice Island" the next day, January 30, 1895.

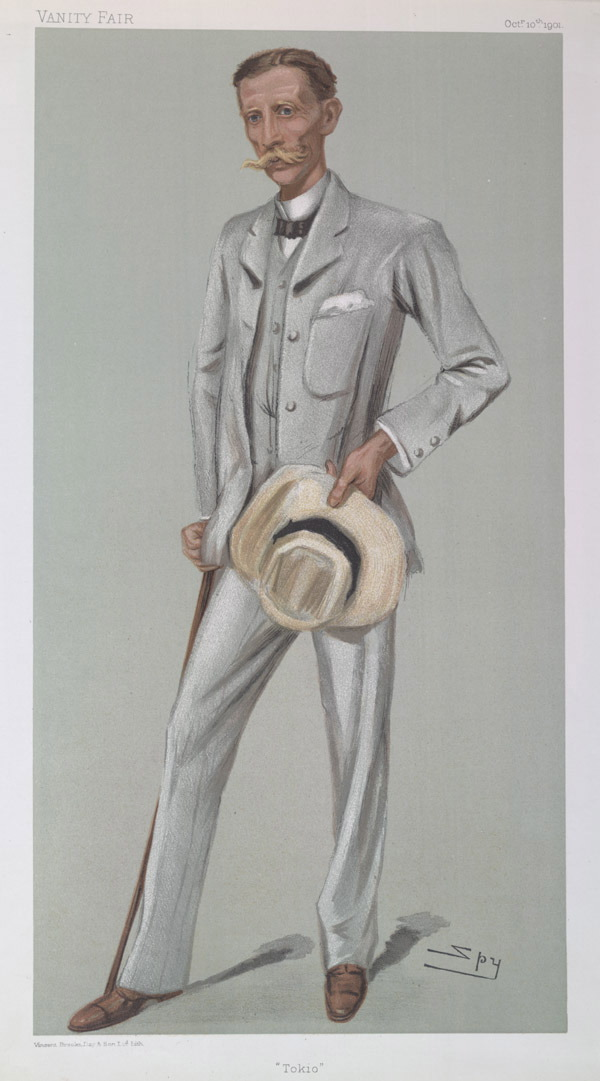
Sir Claude MacDonald, British consul-general at Brass

Koko then sought to negotiate with the Company for the release of the hostages, his price being a return to free trading conditions, and on 2 February he wrote to Sir Claude MacDonald, the British consul-general, that he had no quarrel with Queen Victoria but only with the Niger Company. MacDonald noted of what Koko said of the Company that it was "complaints it had been my unpleasant duty to listen to for the last three and a half years without being able to gain for them any redress". Despite this, the British refused Koko's demands, and more than forty of the hostages were then ceremoniously eaten. On 20 February, a Royal Navy expedition launched a retaliatory raid against the Nembe Kingdom, capturing and razing the kingdom's capital city of Nembe. Many more of his people died from a severe outbreak of smallpox.

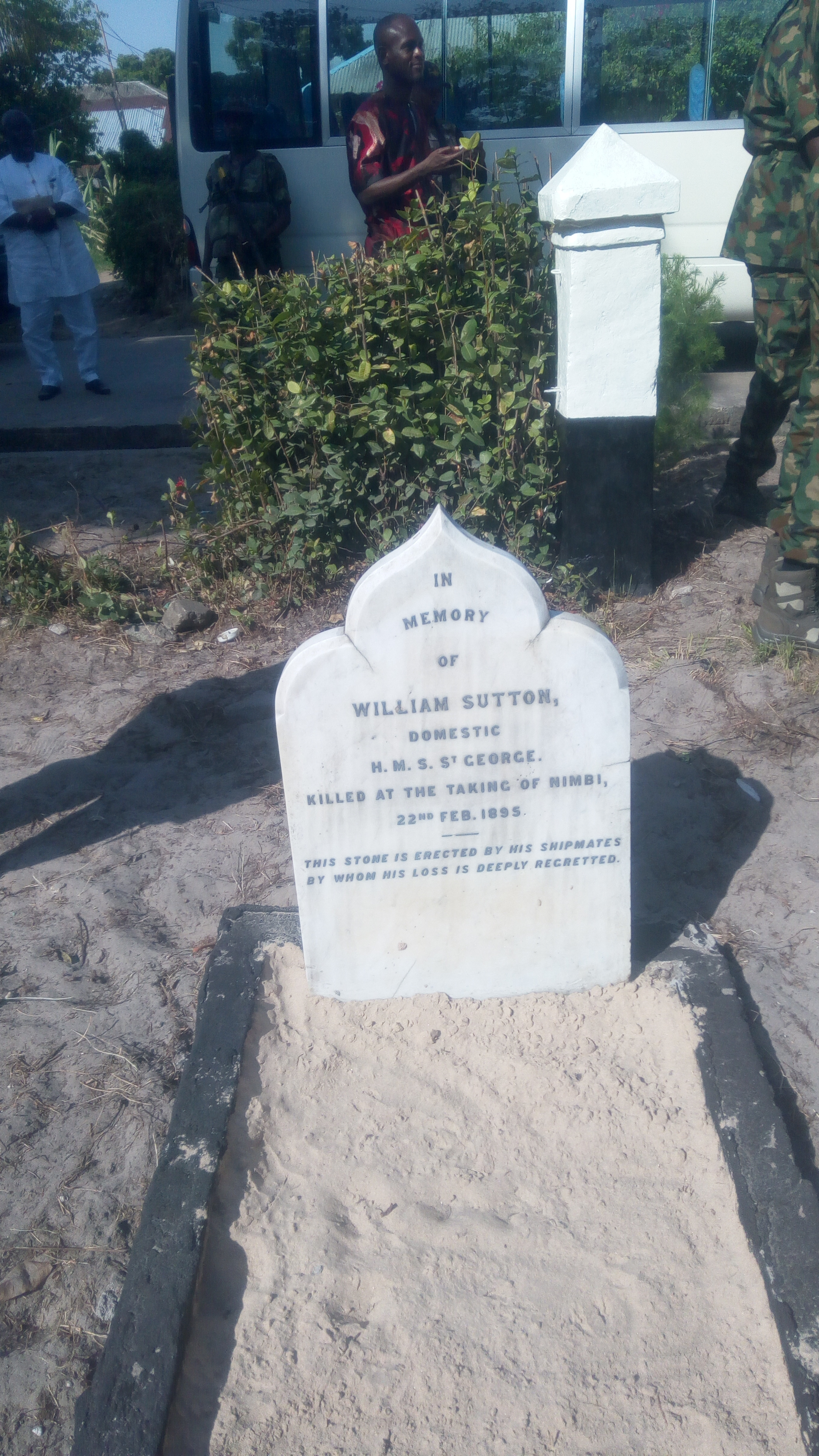
Grave of William Sutton of HMS St George, killed on 22 February

Rear Admiral Sir Frederick Bedford, who had led the British forces against Koko, sent the following telegram to the Admiralty from Brass on 23 February:

Left Brass on February 20, with HMS Widgeon, HMS Thrush, two steamers of the Niger Company, and the boat of HMS St George, with Marines and Protectorate troops; anchored off Nimbi Creek and seized Sacrifice Island the same afternoon; the approach was obstructed by stockades, which are also under construction on the island; 25 war canoes came out and opened an ineffectual fire; three were sunk, and the rest retired. On February 21 the intricate channels were buoyed and the creek reconnoitred. At daybreak on February 22 we attacked, and, after an obstinate defence of a position naturally difficult, a landing was gallantly effected and Nimbi completely burned. In the evening the force was withdrawn, after King Koko's and other chiefs' houses were destroyed.

Bedford sent a further despatch from Brass on 25 February:

Fishtown destroyed today. Brass chiefs and people implicated in attack Akassa have now been punished. No more casualties. Wounded progressing favourably. No further operations contemplated. Consul-General concurs. I am leaving for Loanda to-morrow evening. Two ships remain in vicinity for present.

On 23 March Sir Claude MacDonald arrived at Brass in his yacht Evangeline towing sixteen of Koko's war canoes which had been surrendered, but the king himself had not been captured. Towards the end of April 1895, the area returned to business as usual, with MacDonald fining the men of Brass £500, an amount which sympathetic traders on the river volunteered to pay. Koko assured the British that his part in the rising had been exaggerated, and returned several cannon and a machine-gun looted from Akassa. There was then an exchange of prisoners. Public opinion in Britain came down against the Royal Niger Company and its director George Goldie, who was seen as having goaded Koko into hostilities. The Colonial Office commissioned the explorer and anti-slavery campaigner Sir John Kirk to write a report on the events at Akassa and Brass, and in August Koko came to Brass to meet MacDonald, who was about to sail for England, but quickly took to the bush again. On MacDonald's arrival at Liverpool he told reporters that the people of Nembe-Brass were waiting for the outcome of Kirk's report.

Sir John Kirk's Report was presented to both Houses of Parliament by command of Her Majesty the Queen in March 1896. One key finding was that forty-three of Koko's prisoners had been murdered and eaten. In April 1896 Koko refused the terms of a settlement offered to him by the British and was declared an outlaw. Reuters reported that the Niger stations were strongly defended in preparation for a possible new attack. However, no attack came. A reward of £200 was unsuccessfully offered for Koko, who was forced to flee from the British, hiding in remote villages.

On 11 June 1896, in reply to a question by Sir Charles Dilke in the House of Commons, George Nathaniel Curzon, Under-Secretary of State for Foreign Affairs, said

The Commissioner has in his possession a plan prepared by the chairman of the Royal Niger Company for the admitting of the Brass men into markets hitherto closed to them on the Niger. It was, however, subject to acceptance by King Koko, which it has been impossible to obtain as, since the attack on Akassa and subsequent cannibalism of captives in his capital, he has declined to meet any of the British authorities, including Sir John Kirk. In consequence of this behaviour he has been deposed. The settlement is now dependent upon the organization of a new native government in Brass, and will, it is hoped, very soon be arrived at.

Koko fled to Etiema, a remote village in the hinterland, where he died in 1898 in a suspected suicide. The next year, the charter of the Royal Niger Company was revoked, an act seen as partly a consequence of the short war with Koko, and with effect from 1 January 1900 the Company sold all its possessions and concessions in Africa to the British government for £865,000.

== Popular culture ==
King Koko day (2012).

In his book for children Doctor Dolittle's Post Office (1923), Hugh Lofting created the West African kingdom of Fantippo, ruled over by a king named Koko. Before his encounters with Dolittle, the fictional King Koko had sometimes made war on others and had sold some of his prisoners as slaves.

== See also ==
- Benin Expedition of 1897
- Nigerian traditional rulers
- Scramble for Africa
