= Nembe Kingdom =

Former kingdom in Nigeria

- Traditional state
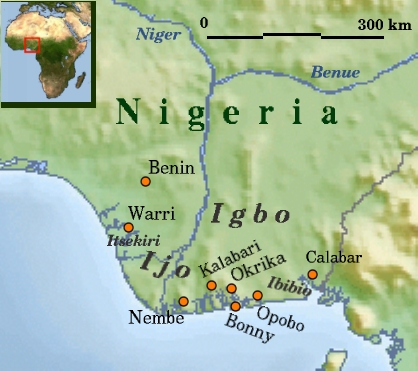
- Ijaw States, including Nembe
- Coordinates: 4°32′N 6°25′E
- Country: Nigeria
- State: Bayelsa State

The Nembe Kingdom is a traditional state in Niger Delta. It includes the Nembe and Brass Local Government Areas of Bayelsa State, Nigeria. The traditional rulers take the title "Amanyanabo". Today, leadership is split between the Amanyanabos of Ogbolomabiri, Bassambiri, Okpoama, Odioama and Twon Brass.

== History ==
The Nembes are an Izon people of the Niger Delta region, settled in the region that now includes the Edumanom Forest Reserve.

The date of foundation of the old Nembe kingdom is unknown. Tradition says that the tenth king was called Ogio, ruling around 1639, the ancestor of all subsequent kings. A civil war later split the city into two factions. At the start of the 19th century, king Ogbodo and his followers moved to a new settlement at Bassimibiri, while king Mingi remained at Nembe city.

With the arrival of Europeans on the coast, the Nembe kingdom became a trading state, but was relatively poor compared to Bonny and Calabar.

The Nembe slave trade picked up in the second quarter of the 19th century when the British attempted to suppress slave-trading in Africa by blockading the ports of Bonny and Calabar. The position of Nembe town 30 miles up the Brass River became an advantage in these circumstances. However, with dwindling demand for slaves, by 1856 the palm-oil trade had become more important and trade had moved to the town of Twon-Brass on the coast. In the later 19th century, Christian missionaries contributed to the existing factional tensions among the Nembe. Ogbolomabiri acquired a Christian mission in 1867, while Bassambiri remained "heathen".

After 1884, the Nembe kingdom was included in the area over which the British claimed sovereignty as part of the Oil Rivers Protectorate. The Nembe, who by now controlled the palm oil trade, at first refused to sign a treaty and sought to prevent the Royal Niger Company obtaining a trade monopoly. In January 1895 the Nembe King William Koko led a dawn attack of more than a thousand warriors on the company's headquarters at Akassa. This triggered a retaliatory raid in which an expeditionary force led by Sir Frederick Bedford captured and sacked Nembe, occurring concurrently with a devastating outbreak of smallpox in the Kingdom. The British later established a consulate in Twon-Brass, from where they administered the area. Traditional rulers were reinstalled in the 1920s, but with an essentially symbolic role which they retain today.

== Rulers ==
=== Ogbolomabiri ===
Rulers of Ogbolomabiri:

Start	End	Ruler
1745	1766	Mingi I
1766	1788	Ikata Mingi II
1788	1800	Gboro Mingi III
1800	1832	Kuko Mingi IV "King Forday"
1832	1846	Amain Mingi V "King Boy"
1846	1846	Kuki
1846	1863	Kien Mingi VI
1863	1879	Joshua Constantine Ockiya Mingi VII
1879	1889	vacant
1889	1896	Frederick William Koko Mingi VIII (d. 1898)
1896	1926	vacant
1926	1939	Joshua Anthony O. Ockiya Mingi IX (c.1873 – 1939
1939	1954	vacant
1954	1979	Francis O. Joseph Allagoa Mingi X (d. 1979)
1979	2007	Ambrose Ezeolisa Allagoa Mingi XI (1914–2003)
2008		Edmund Maduabebe Daukoru, Mingi XII (b. 1943)

=== Bassambiri ===
Later rulers of Bassambiri:

Start	End	Ruler
	1870	Arisimo "King Peter"
1870	1894	Ebifa
1894	1924	vacant
1924	1927	Albert Oguara
1928		Ben I. Warri
1978	1993	King Collins Festus Amaegbe-Eremienyo Ogbodo VII (1930–1993)
1996	2013	Ralph Michael Iwowari (1930–2013)
