= Nun River =

River in Bayelsa State, Nigeria

- 2005 satellite view of Niger Delta. Nun River in the center

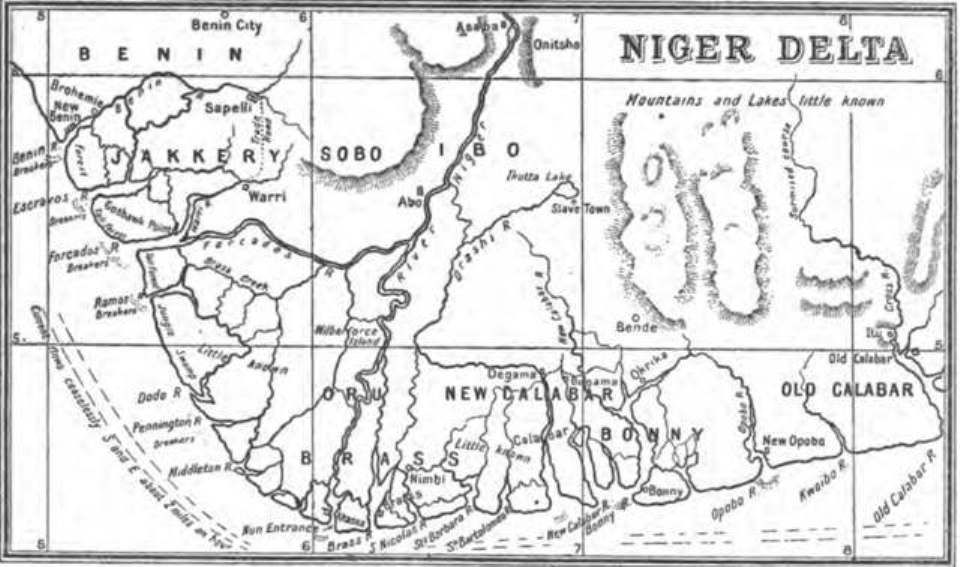
- Niger Delta in 1898.

Location
- Country: Nigeria
- State: Bayelsa State

Physical characteristics
- Source
  - coordinates: 5.298847°N 6.414350°E
- Mouth
  - coordinates: 5.308333°N 6.416667°E
- Length: 160 km (99 mi)

The Nun River, also known as Rio Nun, is a river in Bayelsa State, Nigeria. The river is formed when the Niger River splits into two at Toru-Abubou, near Agbere Town in Sagbama Local Government Area of Bayelsa State, forming the Nun and the Forcados rivers.

Upon emerging from its parent river, Niger, the Nun River flows for almost 160 kilometres (100 mi) south to the Gulf of Guinea at Akassa. Its course runs mainly through thinly settled areas and swamps.

In the 19th century, the Nun was a hub for trade between Europe and the Igbo people – based at Aboh. The river's trading history began with the trade of slaves but was later replaced by palm oil export. However, at the turn of the century, the river mouth silted heavily, blocking the passage. Subsequently, traders began using the more accessible waters of the Forcados River.

The Nun River is immortalized in the poetry of Gabriel Okara. His poem The Call of the River Nun is a nostalgic ode to the river that passes through his home.

== Pollution ==
Oil spill pollution has remained a source of several international litigations in the Niger Delta region of Nigeria. Impacts of small recurrent crude oil spills on the physicochemical, microbial and hydrobiological properties of the Nun River, a primary source of drinking water, food and recreational activities for communities in the region. Samples were collected from six sampling points along the stretch of the lower Nun River over a 3-week period. Temperature, pH salinity, turbidity, total suspended solids, total dissolved solids, dissolved oxygen, phosphate, nitrate, heavy metals, BTEX, PAHs and microbial and plankton contents were assessed to ascertain the quality and level of deterioration of the river. The results obtained were compared with the baseline data from studies, national and international standards. The results of the physicochemical parameters indicated a significant deterioration of the river quality due to oil production activities. Turbidity, TDS, TSS, DO, conductivity and heavy metals (Cd, Cr, Cu, Pb, Ni and Zn) were in breach of the national and international limits for drinking water aquatic health. They were also significantly higher than the initial baseline conditions of the river. Also, there were noticeable changes in the phytoplankton, zooplankton and microbial diversities due to oil pollution across the sampling zones.

== Climate ==
Nun Rivers climate range at the moment has a water temperature is 24°C and the average water temperature is 24°C.

== Events ==
On 27 September 2017, the Nun burst its banks overnight and submerged residential homes along its bank in Yenagoa, the Bayelsa State capital.

On 16 November 2019, four journalists returning from a polling station, on governorship election duties, were rescued when their boat capsized.
