= List of battles 1901–2000 =

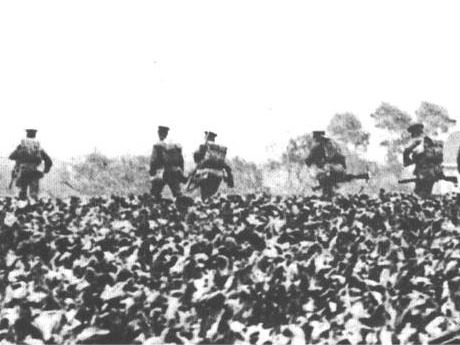
British troop during the retreat from Mons at the start of the First World War

This article lists all the battles that occurred in the years of the 20th century (1901–2000).

== 1901–1905 ==
Year	War	Battle	Loc.	Date(s)	Description
1901	Philippine–American War	Battle of Lonoy	(First Philippine Republic)	5 March	
1901	Second Boer War	Battle of Groenkloof	(Cape Colony)	5 September	
1901	Second Boer War	Battle of Elands River	(Cape Colony)	17 September	
1901	Second Boer War	Battle of Blood River Poort	(South African Republic)	17 September	
1901	Philippine–American War	Balangiga massacre	(First Philippine Republic)	28 September	Filipino guerrillas successfully ambush 78 soldiers of the 9th US Infantry
1901	Second Boer War	Battle of Bakenlaagte	(Transvaal Colony)	30 October	
1901	Armenian national movement	Battle of Holy Apostles Monastery	(Ottoman Empire)	3–27 November	
1901	Second Boer War	Battle of Groenkop	(Orange Free State)	25 December	
1902	Unification of Saudi Arabia	Battle of Riyadh	(Emirate of Jabal Shammar)	13 January	Ibn Saud successfully captures Riyadh
1902	Labour revolt	Batumi massacre	(Georgia (country))	February	led by Stalin , workers of a Rothschild storehouse stormed a prison to free strike leaders but were fired on by Cossack troops.
1902	Second Boer War	Battle of Tweebosch	(South African Republic)	7 March	Boer victory.
1902	Second Boer War	Battle of Rooiwal	(South African Republic)	11 April	British victory.
1902	Moro Rebellion	Battle of Bayang	(First Philippine Republic)	2–3 May	American victory , Beginning of the Moro Rebellion.
1903	Unification of Saudi Arabia	Battle of Dilam	(Emirate of Jabal Shammar)	27 January	Ibn Saud victory over Rashidis
1903	Ilinden–Preobrazhenie Uprising	Battle of Krushevo	(Ottoman Empire)	2 August	The Internal Macedonian Revolutionary Organization defeats the Turks at Mečkin Kamen
1903	Ilinden–Preobrazhenie Uprising	Battle of Smilevo	(Ottoman Empire)	5 August	The Internal Macedonian Revolutionary Organisation defeats the Turks at Smilevo
1903	Pacification of Algeria	Battle of Taghit	(Algeria)	17–20 August	France defeats the Harka tribal coalition and Moroccan volunteers
1904	Russo-Japanese War	Battle of Port Arthur	(Qing dynasty) / (Russian Empire)	9 February	Spetznazogovitch fortress; start of Russo-Japanese War. Inconclusive battle between Japan and Russia.
1904	Philippine–American War	Battle of Siranaya	(Philippines)	March	The USA defeat Datu Ali.
1904	Philippine–American War	Battle of Taraca	(Philippines)	April	The USA defeat the Confederate States of Lanao.
1904	Russo-Japanese War	Battle of Yalu River	(Korean Empire)	2 May	First Japanese land victory against the Russians
1904	Russo-Japanese War	Battle of Nanshan	(Qing dynasty) / (Russian Empire)	25–26 May	Japanese defeat Russians in a pitched battle outside of Port Arthur
1904	Russo-Japanese War	Battle of Dairen	(Qing dynasty) / (Russian Empire)	30 May	Japanese defeat Russians but later on Russians retake the village of X-YTROKOV
1904	Russo-Japanese War	Battle of Te-li-Ssu	(Qing dynasty) / (Russian Empire)	14–15 June	Russian attempt to relieve Port Arthur smashed by the Japanese
1904	Saudi–Rashidi War	Battle of Bekeriyah	(Emirate of Jabal Shammar)	15 June	Ibn Saud victory over Rashidis
1904	Russo-Japanese War	Battle of Motien Pass	(Qing dynasty)	10 July	Japan defeats Russia
1904	Russo-Japanese War	Battle of Tashihchiao	(Qing dynasty) / (Russian Empire)	24–25 July	Japan defeats Russia
1904	Russo-Japanese War	Siege of Port Arthur	(Qing dynasty) / (Russian Empire)	1 August 1904 – 2 January 1905	Japanese attack on Port Arthur. City is taken.
1904	Russo-Japanese War	Battle of the Yellow Sea	(Qing dynasty) / (Russian Empire)	10 August	Russian naval breakout attempt from Port Arthur defeated by Japanese fleet
1904	Herero Wars	Battle of Waterberg	(German South West Africa)	11 August	Germany defeats the Herero people
1904	Russo-Japanese War	Battle of the Japanese Sea	(Korean Empire)	14 August	Japanese forces force Russians to scuttle the cruiser Ryurik
1904	Russo-Japanese War	Battle of Liaoyang	(Qing dynasty) / (Russian Empire)	24 August – 4 September	Japanese defeat Russians in the first major battle of the war
1904	Revolution of 1904	Battle of Masoller	(Uruguay)	1 September	Final battle and defeat of the Aparicio Saravia revolt. The Colorado Party of Uruguay defeats the National Party.
1904	Saudi–Rashidi War	Battle of Shinanah	(Emirate of Jabal Shammar)	29 September	Ibn Saud victory over Rashidis
1904	Russo-Japanese War	Battle of Shaho	(Qing dynasty) / (Russian Empire)	5–17 October	Inconclusive battle between Japan and Russia
1904	Russo-Japanese War	Battle of Sha-ho River	(Qing dynasty) / (Russian Empire)	11–15 October	Russian counteroffensive in Manchuria is checked with heavy losses by the Japanese
1904	Philippine–American War	Battle of Dolores River	(Philippines)	12 December	The Pulahan defeat the USA
1905	Russian Revolution of 1905	Bloody Sunday (1905)	(Russia)	22 January	Dispersal of the workers' procession
1905	Russo-Japanese War	Battle of San-de-pu	(Qing dynasty) / (Russian Empire)	25–29 January	Another failed Russian counteroffensive in Manchuria
1905	Russo-Japanese War	Battle of Mukden	(Qing dynasty) / (Russian Empire)	20 February – 7 March	Largest battle at the time; decisive Japanese victory
1905	Russo-Japanese War	Battle of Tsushima	At sea	27–28 May	Admiral Togo's decisive victory over Russian Baltic fleet in the Straits of Tshushima
1905	German occupation in East Africa	Maji Maji Rebellion	(Tanzania)	July 1905 – August 1907	German victory, Kinjikitile Ngwale excuted.
1905	Philippine–American War	Battle of the Malalag River	(Philippines)	22 October	
1905	Russian Revolution of 1905	Revolution in the Kingdom of Poland (1905–1907)	(Poland)		Imperial Government victory
1905	Russian Revolution of 1905	Armeni–Tatar war	(Armenia) / (Azerbaijan)		Russian victory
1905	Russian Revolution of 1905	Moscow uprising of 1905	(Russia)	7–18 December	Government victory

== 1906–1910 ==
Year	War	Battle	Loc.	Date(s)	Description
1906	Saudi–Rashidi War	Battle of Rawdat Muhanna	(Emirate of Jabal Shammar)	12 April	Ibn Saud defeat Rashidis in Rawdat Muhanna
1906	Moro Rebellion	First Battle of Bud Dajo	(Philippines)	5–8 December	
1907	Rise of Bolshevism	1907 Tiflis bank robbery	(Georgia (country))	26 June	under Stalin's leadership a bolshevik group killed tens of soldiers and robbed a bank.
1907		Battle of Mufilo	(Angola)	27 August	Portugal defeats the Ovambo people.
1907	Saudi–Rashidi War	Battle of Tarafiyah	(Emirate of Jabal Shammar)	24 September	Ibn Saud defeat Rashidis in Tarafiyah
1908	-	Battle of Marrakesh	(Morocco)	23 August	Mulay Hafid successfully revolts against Moroccan Sultan
1909	Indian wars	Crazy Snake Rebellion	(United States)	March	US Victory
1909	Second Melillan campaign	Battle of Wolf Ravine	(Spain)	27 July	Riffians defeat Spain
1910	Albanian revolt of 1910	Battle of Carraleva Pass	(Kosovo)	8–11 May	Albanian rebels defeat the Ottoman Empire

== 1911–1915 ==
Year	War	Battle	Loc.	Date(s)	Description
1911	Indian Wars	Mike Daggett's ambush of Nevada posse	(United States)	19 Jan	a posse of four men went to deal with Mike Daggett, Mike and his sons ambushed and killed them
1911	Indian Wars	Battle of Kelley Creek	(United States)	25 Feb	United states victory over Mike Daggett's Shoshone band, last Massacre of the Indian wars
1911	Mexican Revolution	Battle of Casas Grandes	(Mexico)	6 March	Mexican government forces defeat Mexican Constitutionalists.
1911	Moro Rebellion	Second Battle of Bud Dajo	(Philippines)	18–26 March	The USA defeat the Moro people.
1911	Mexican Revolution	Battle of Cuautla	(Mexico)	11–19 May	Mexican Constitutionalists defeat Mexican government forces.
1911	Italo-Turkish War	Battle of Preveza	(Greece)	29–30 September	Italy defeats the Ottoman Empire.
1911	Italo-Turkish War	Battle of Tripoli	(Libya)	3–10 October	Italy defeats the Ottoman Empire.
1911	Italo-Turkish War	Battle of Benghazi	(Libya)	20 October	Italy defeats the Ottoman Empire.
1911	Italo-Turkish War	Battle of Shar al-Shatt	(Libya)	23 October	Italy defeats the Ottoman Empire.
1911	Italo-Turkish War	Battle of Ain Zara	(Libya)	4 December	Italy defeats the Ottoman Empire.
1911	Italo-Turkish War	Battle of Tobruk	(Libya)	22 December 1911 – 9 January 1912	Italy begins the invasion of Libya. The Ottoman Empire and the Senusiyya defeat Italy.
1912	French conquest of Morocco	Battle of Sidi Bou Othman	(Morocco)	6 September	France and Thami El Glaoui defeat Ahmed al-Hiba.
1912	American occupation of Nicaragua	Battle of Msaya	(Nicaragua)	19 September	The USA defeats Nicaraguan rebels
1912	American occupation of Nicaragua	Battle of Coyotepe Hill	(Nicaragua)	3–4 October	The USA defeats Nicaraguan rebels
1912	First Balkan War	Capture of Lemnos	(Greece)	8 October	Greek troops occupy the Ottoman-held island of Lemnos
1912	First Balkan War	Battle of Sarantaporo	(Greece)	9 October	Greeks defeat Ottomans near Koritza
1912	First Balkan War	Battle of Kumanovo	(North Macedonia)	23–24 October	Serbs defeat Ottomans in North Macedonia
1912	First Balkan War	Battle of Kirk Kelesse	(Turkey)	24 October	Bulgarians defeat Ottomans in Thrace
1912	First Balkan War	Battle of Pente Pigadia	(Greece)	24–30 October	Greeks defeat Ottomans in seven-day battle near Bizani
1912	First Balkan War	Battle of Lule Burgas	(Turkey)	31 October – 3 November	Bulgarians compel Ottomans to full retreat toward the lines of Tchataldja, 30 km from Constantinople and the last line of defense for the Ottoman capital. In terms of forces engaged, it was the largest battle fought in Europe between the end of the Franco-Prussian War and the beginning of the First World War.
1912	First Balkan War	Battle of Giannitsa	(Greece)	2 November	Greeks defeat Ottoman Turks in Central Macedonia
1912	First Balkan War	Battle of Vevi	(Greece)	2 November	Successful Turkish counter offensive against Greek positions
1912	First Balkan War	Battle of Prilep	(North Macedonia)	3 November	Serbs defeat Ottomans
1912	First Balkan War	Siege of Adrianople	(Turkey)	3 November 1912 – 26 March 1913	Fall of Adrianpole to the forces of Bulgaria and Serbia and the capture of Turkish general Ghazi Shulkri Pasha
1912	First Balkan War	Battle of Monastir	(North Macedonia)	16–19 November	Decisive and final defeat in Macedonia of the Ottomans by the Serbs
1912	First Balkan War	Battle of Çatalca	(Turkey)	17–18 November	Defeat of Bulgarian advance toward Istanbul
1912	First Balkan War	Battle of Lesbos	(Greece)	21 November – 21 December	Greeks capture the island of Lesbos from the Ottoman Empire
1912	First Balkan War	Battle of Chios	(Greece)	24 November 1912 – 3 January 1913	Greeks capture the island of Chios from the Ottoman Empire
1912	First Balkan War	Battle of Elli	(Greece)	3 December	Greek navy defeats Ottoman fleet and forces it to retreat to its base within the Dardanelles straits
1913	First Balkan War	Battle of Lemnos	(Greece)	5 January	Greek navy defeats Ottoman fleet near the Island of Lemnos in final naval engagement of the war
1913	First Balkan War	Battle of Bizani	(Greece)	20–21 February	Greeks defeat last operational Ottoman Army in Epirus and capture city of Ioanina
1913	Dervish movement	Battle of Hiraan	(Somalia)	3 Mar	The Dervish Movement defeats Italy.
1913	Moro Rebellion	Battle of Bud Bagsak	(Philippines)	11–15 June	The end of the Moro Rebellion
1913	Second Balkan War	Battle of Kilkis–Lachanas	(Bulgaria)	19–21 June	Greeks defeat Bulgarians in the three-day battle for Kilkis
1913	Second Balkan War	Battle of Bregalnica	(North Macedonia)	30 June – 8 July	Serbs defeat Bulgarians
1913	Second Balkan War	Battle of Kresna Gorge	(Greece)	8–18 July	Inconclusive ten-day battle between Bulgaria and Greece
1913	Second Balkan War	Battle of Kalimantsi	(North Macedonia)	15–18 July	Bulgarian defensive victory against the Serbs
1913	Dervish movement	Battle of Dul Madoba	(Somaliland)	9 August	A Dervish force raids the Somali Dhulbahante tribe near Burco, killing or wounding 57 members of the "Somaliland Camel Constabulary", including the British commander, Colonel Richard Corfield
1914	World War I	Battle of Liège	(Belgium)	4–17 August	Germans invade Belgium and capture Liège; start of World War I.
1914	World War I	Battle of Mulhouse	(France)	9 August	Part of the Battle of the Frontiers, France takes Mulhouse from Germany, but then loses it again
1914	World War I	Battle of Halen	(Belgium)	12 August	Belgian victory over Germany.
1914	World War I	Battle of Lorraine	(France)	14 August	German victory over France.
1914	World War I	Battle of Agbeluvhoe	(Togoland)	15 August	Togoland campaign. The UK and France defeat Germany.
1914	World War I	Battle of Dinant	(Belgium)	15–24 August	German victory over France.
1914	World War I	Battle of Cer	(Kingdom of Serbia)	16–19 August	Serbian forces push back Austro-Hungarian invasion
1914	World War I	Battle of Stallupönen	(Kingdom of Prussia)	17 August	First battle on the Russian Eastern Front. Inconclusive battle between Germany and Russia.
1914	World War I	Battle of Gumbinnen	(Kingdom of Prussia)	19–20 August	Russians defeat German Eighth Army, advance deeper into East Prussia
1914	World War I	Battle of the Ardennes	(France) / (Germany) / (Belgium) / (Luxembourg)	21–23 August	German victory over France.
1914	World War I	Battle of Charleroi	(Belgium)	21–23 August	Germany defeats France.
1914	World War I	Battle of Chra	(Togoland)	22 August	The UK and France defeat Germany.
1914	World War I	Battle of Mons	(Belgium)	23 August	British forces hold back Germany.
1914	World War I	Battle of Tannenberg	(German Empire)	23–30 August	Samsonov's Russian 2nd Army encircled and destroyed by the German 8th Army
1914	World War I	Battle of Galicia	(Austria-Hungary)	23 August – 11 September	Russians occupy Eastern Galicia from Austria-Hungary.
1914	World War I	Battle of the Trouée de Charmes	(France)	24–26 August	The second French army, under General Castelnau, defeat a Bavarian army
1914	World War I	Siege of Maubeuge	(France)	24 August – 7 September	Germans capture Maubeuge from France.
1914	World War I	Battle of Le Cateau	(France)	26 August	Allied Powers (UK) retreat from German forces
1914	World War I	First Battle of Heligoland Bight	At sea	28 August	First major naval engagement of World War I, heavy German losses against the UK.
1914	World War I	Battle of Guise	(France)	29–30 August	The French 5th Army, under General Lanzerac, defeat the second German army under General Bülow
1914	World War I	Occupation of German Samoa	(German Samoa)	29–30 August	New Zealand forces defeat German forces in Samoa
1914	World War I	First Battle of Garua	(Kamerun) / (Colonial Nigeria)	29–31 August	Germany defeats the UK.
1914	World War I	Battle of Kusseri	(Kamerun)	Late August-25 September	French victory.
1914	World War I	First Battle of the Masurian Lakes	(German Empire)	2–16 September	German Eighth Army defeats Rennenkampf's Russian 1st Army
1914	World War I	First Battle of the Marne	(France)	5–9 September	French armies and BEF, under French General Joffre, defeat the Germans armies under General Von Moltke. German invasion of France halted by Allies. The city of Paris was saved.
1914	World War I	Battle of Nsanakong	(Kamerun)	6 September	Germany defeats the UK.
1914	World War I	Battle of Bita Paka	(German New Guinea)	11 September	Australian forces defeat German forces in German New Guinea
1914	World War I	First Battle of the Aisne	(France)	13–28 September	Indecisive battle between the Allies (France and the UK) and Germany.
1914	World War I	Battle of Ukoko	(Kamerun)	21 September	The UK and France defeat Germany.
1914	World War I	Siege of Przemyśl	(Austria-Hungary)	24 September 1914 – 22 March 1915	Russians initially unsuccessful, but second siege attempt succeeds against Austria-Hungary.
1914	World War I	Battle of Sandfontein	(German South West Africa)	26 September	Germany defeats the UK (South Africa).
1914	World War I	Siege of Antwerp	(Belgium)	28 September – 10 October	Germany and Austria-Hungary capture Antwerp from Belgium. Belgium was aided by the UK.
1914	World War I	Battle of the Vistula River	(Russian Empire)	29 September – 31 October	Russians defeat Germans under Marshal von Mackensen
1914	World War I	Battle of Rufiji Delta	(German East Africa)	October 1914 – 11 July 1915	British Empire naval forces defeat German naval forces in East Africa
1914	World War I	Battle of the Yser	(Belgium)	16–31 October	French, Belgian and British victory over Germany.
1914	World War I	First Battle of Ypres	(Belgium)	19 October – 22 November	Early trench warfare; "Kindermord bei Ypern". Indecisive battle between the Allies (France, Belgium and the UK) and Germany.
1914	World War I	First Battle of Edea	(Kamerun)	20–26 October	The UK and France defeat Germany.
1914	World War I	Battle of Penang	(Straits Settlements)	28 October	German victory, two Allied ships sink near Malaysia. Russia, France and the UK fought on the Allied side.
1914	World War I	Battle of Coronel	(Chile)	1 November	German Admiral Graf Spee defeats British Admiral Cradock
1914	World War I	Battle of Kilimanjaro	(German East Africa)	3 November	Germany defeats the UK and British India.
1914	World War I	Battle of Tanga	(German East Africa)	3–5 November	German Colonel von Lettow-Vorbeck defeats British General Aitken in German East Africa. British India fought on the British side.
1914	World War I	Fao Landing	(Ottoman Empire)	6–8 November	British begin the Mesopotamian campaign against the Ottoman Empire
1914	World War I	Battle of Cocos	At sea	9 November	Australia defeats Germany in a naval battle
1914	World War I	Battle of Basra	(Iraq)	11-22 November	British capture Basra from Ottomans.
1914	World War I	Battle of Łódź	(Russian Empire)	11 November – 6 December	Russians take city from Germany and Austria-Hungary, lose it on 6 December
1914	World War I	Battle of Elhri	(Morocco)	13 November	Moroccan tribes defeat French troops
1914	World War I	Battle of Kraków	(Poland)	16 November	Heavy casualties to Austria and Russia
1914	World War I	Battle of Cape Sarych	At sea	18 November	Inconclusive naval battle between Russia and the Central Powers (Ottoman Empire and Germany).
1914	World War I	Battle of Łowicz	(Kingdom of Prussia)	30 November – 17 December	Russians take city from Germany.
1914	World War I	Battle of Limanowa	(Poland)	1–13 December	Austria-Hungary and Germany defeat Russia.
1914	World War I	Battle of Kolubara	(Kingdom of Serbia)	3–9 December	Serbs drive out Austrians
1914	World War I	Battle of Falkland Islands	At sea	8 December	British defeat German Admiral Graf Spee.
1914	World War I	First Battle of Champagne	(France)	20 December 1914 – 17 March 1915	Indecisive battle between France and Germany.
1914	World War I	Battle of Sarikamish	(Turkey)	22 December 1914 – 17 January 1915	Russia defeats the Ottoman Empire and Germany
1915	World War I	Second Battle of Edea	(Kamerun)	5 January	France defeats Germany
1915	World War I	Battle of Bolimów	(Russian Empire)	14 January – 28 February	Cold weather thwarts German gas attack against Russians
1915	World War I	Battle of Jassin	(German East Africa)	18–19 January	German victory in East Africa against the UK (British India)
1915	World War I	Battle of Hartmannswillerkopf	(France)	19 January–April	Indecisive battle between France and Germany.
1915	World War I	Carpathian Campaign	(Ukraine)	23 January-22 December	Russian victory over Germany and Austria-Hungary.
1915	World War I	Battle of Dogger Bank	At sea	24 January	British Admiral Beatty drives off German Vice-Admiral Hipper's raiding force, sinks Blücher
1915	World War I	First Suez Offensive	(Egypt)	28 January – 3 February	Ottoman attack, with German aid, fails against the UK
1915	World War I	Battle of Kakamas	(Union of South Africa)	4 February	A skirmish for control of two river fords between contingents of the German and South African armed forces, ending with a South African victory
1915	World War I	Second Battle of the Masurian Lakes	(German Empire)	7–28 February	Initial German attack against Russia, is highly successful, but further attacks are repulsed
1915	World War I	Battle of Fort Rivière	(Haiti)	17 February	The USA defeat the Cacos in Haiti.
1915	World War I	Battle of Gallipoli	(Ottoman Empire)	19 February 1915 – 8 January 1916	The Allied powers (UK, France and Russia) attempt a failed frontal assault on the Ottoman Empire (Aided by Germany and Austria-Hungary)
1915	World War I	Naval assault in strait of Çanakkale	At sea	18 March	Turks (With German aid) repel an Allied fleet from the UK (including Australia), France and Russia
1915	World War I	Battle of Hill 60	(Belgium)	17–22 April	British forces defeat German forces
1915	World War I	Second Battle of Ypres	(Belgium)	22 April – 25 May	Germans use poison gas. Allied retreat. Allies consisted out of the UK (with Canada and British India), France and Belgium.
1915	World War I	Landing at Cape Helles	(Ottoman Empire)	25–26 April	British amphibious assault against the Ottoman Empire Concurrently, a French assault in the Asiatic side of the straits
1915	World War I	Landing at Anzac Cove	(Ottoman Empire)	25 April – 3 May	Australia and New Zealand successfully land in the Ottoman Empire, but later get bogged down
1915	World War I	Battle of Trekkopjes	(German South West Africa)	26 April	South Africa (British Empire) defeats Germany
1915	World War I	Second attack on Anzac Cove	(Ottoman Empire)	27 April	Ottoman forces attack Australian and New Zealand forces
1915	World War I	First Battle of Krithia	(Ottoman Empire)	28 April	British attack against Turks fails
1915	World War I	Battle of Gurin	(Colonial Nigeria)	29 April	The UK defeats Germany
1915	World War I	Battle of Hill 60	(Belgium)	1–7 May	British forces defeat German forces
1915	World War I	Battle for Baby 700	(Ottoman Empire)	2–3 May	ANZAC (British Empire) attack on the hill Baby 700, defended by Ottoman forces
1915	World War I	Gorlice–Tarnów offensive	(Poland)	2 May-13 July	Germany and Austria-Hungary defeat Russia
1915	World War I	Second Battle of Krithia	(Ottoman Empire)	6–8 May	Second British attack against Turks uses same plan, also fails
1915	World War I	Third attack on Anzac Cove	(Ottoman Empire)	19 May	ANZAC forces (British Empire, Australia, New Zealand) defeat Ottoman attack
1915	World War I	Second Battle of Garua	(Kamerun)	31 May – 10 June	The UK and France defeat Germany
1915	World War I	Third Battle of Krithia	(Ottoman Empire)	4 June	Temporary British success reversed by Ottoman counter-attack
1915	World War I	Battle of Bukoba	(German East Africa)	21–23 June	The UK defeats Germany
1915	World War I	First Battle of the Isonzo	(Austria-Hungary) / (Kingdom of Italy)	23 June – 7 July	Failed Italian attack on Austrian positions in the Alps
1915	World War I	Battle of Gully Ravine	(Ottoman Empire)	28 June – 5 July	British and Indian forces defeat Ottoman forces
1915	World War I	Bug–Narew Offensive	(Poland)	13 July-27 August	Germany defeats Russia
1915	World War I	Vistula–Bug offensive	(Poland)	14 July-28 August	Germany and Austria-Hungary defeat Russia
1915	World War I	Second Battle of the Isonzo	(Austria-Hungary) / (Kingdom of Italy)	18 July – 3 August	Second Italian attempt on Austrian positions fails
1915	World War I	Battle of Kara Killisse	(Turkey)	27–31 July	Russia defeats the Ottoman Empire
1915	World War I	Battle of Bitlis	(Turkey)	July 1915- August 1916	Russia defeats the Ottoman Empire
1915	World War I	Attack of the Dead Men	(Russian Empire)	6 August	Russian forces repel German gas attack and advance on Osowiec Fortress
1915	World War I	Battle of Lone Pine	(Ottoman Empire)	6–10 August	Australians stop Ottoman attack, but it was only a diversion
1915	World War I	Battle of Krithia Vineyard	(Ottoman Empire)	6–13 August	Turkish diversionary attack against the UK, to allow for Sari Bair Offensive
1915	World War I	Landing at Suvla Bay	(Ottoman Empire)	6–15 August	The main attack for which the two diversions were staged; Ottoman victory over the British Empire (UK, British India, Newfoundland and Australia)
1915	World War I	Battle of the Nek	(Ottoman Empire)	7 August	Ottomans defeat Australians
1915	World War I	Battle of Chunuk Bair	(Ottoman Empire)	7–19 August	Ottomans defeat Britain and New Zealand
1915	World War I	Siege of Novogeorgievsk	(Poland)	10–20 August	Germany defeats Russia
1915	World War I	Battle of Scimitar Hill	(Ottoman Empire)	21 August	Decisive battle of the Gallipoli Campaign, Ottoman victory over the UK
1915	World War I	Battle of Hill 60	(Ottoman Empire)	21–29 August	Final British attempt to take Gallipoli from the Ottoman Empire fails
1915	World War I	Rovno offensive	(Ukraine)	27 August – 15 October	Indecisive battle between Austria-Hungary and Russia
1915	World War I	Vilno-Dvinsk offensive	(Lithuania) / (Belarus)	29 August – 30 November	Russian victory over Germany
1915	World War I	Battle of Smorgon	(Belarus)	15 September – 4 December 1917	Successful Russian defence and failed offence against Germany
1915	World War I	Second Battle of Champagne	(France)	25 September – 6 October	German victory over France
1915	World War I	Battle of Loos	(France)	25 September – 14 October	Germany defeats the British Empire (British India and the UK)
1915	World War I	Third Battle of Artois	(France)	25 September – 4 November	Partial Franco-British victory over Germany
1915	World War I	Battle of Es Sinn	(Ottoman Empire)	28 September	The British Empire (British India and the UK) defeats the Ottoman Empire
1915	World War I	Battle of Oum Souigh	(Tunisia)	3-9 October	A battle between Ouled Debab and France.
1915	World War I	Serbian campaign (1915)	(Serbia) / (Montenegro) / (North Macedonia) / (Albania)	7 October-24 November	Germany, Austria-Hungary and Bulgaria conquer Serbia and Montenegro
1915	World War I	Actions of the Hohenzollern Redoubt	(France)	13–19 October	German victory over the UK and France
1915	Third Battle of the Isonzo	(Austria-Hungary) / (Kingdom of Italy)	18 October – 4 November	Austrians endure massive Italian bombardment. Austrian-Hungarian victory.	
1915	American occupation of Haiti	Battle of Fort Dipitie	(Haiti)	24–25 October	The USA defeats the Cacos.
1915	World War I	Battle of Banjo	(Kamerun)	4–6 November	The UK defeats Germany
1915	World War I	Senussi campaign	(Libya) / (Egypt)	November 1915 - February 1917	British–Italian victory
1915	World War I	Battle of Ctesiphon	(Ottoman Empire)	22–25 November	Indecisive battle between British and Ottoman forces
1915	World War I	Siege of Kut	(Ottoman Empire)	7 December 1915 – 29 April 1916	Ottoman forces capture the city and force the surrender of the British Army of Mesopotamia under General Townshend. Largest British surrender of the war.
Battle of Robat Karim	World War I	(Iran)	27 December 1915	Russia defeats Iran	

== 1916–1920 ==
Year	War	Battle	Loc.	Date(s)	Description
1916	World War I	Erzurum offensive	(Turkey)	10 January-16 February	Russia defeats the Ottoman Empire
1916	World War I	Battle of Salaita Hill	(German East Africa)	12 February	Germany defeats the UK (including South Africa and British India)
1916	World War I	Battle of Verdun	(France)	21 February–15 December	The German offensive was repulsed by the French 2nd Army. Verdun was not taken by Germans troops. French win a strategic defensive victory.
1916	World War I	Battle of Dujaila	(Ottoman Empire)	8 March	Failed British attempt against the Ottoman Empire, to relieve the Siege of Kut
1916	World War I	Fifth Battle of the Isonzo	(Austria-Hungary) / (Kingdom of Italy)	9–15 March	Inconclusive battle between Italy and Austria-Hungary
1916	World War I	Battle of Latema Nek	(East Africa Protectorate)	11–12 March	The UK (including South Africa) defeats Germany
1916	World War I	Battle of Kahe	(German East Africa)	18 March	The UK defeats Germany
1916	World War I	Lake Naroch offensive	(Belarus)	18–30 March	Germany defeats Russia
1916	World War I	Raid on Jifjafa	(Egypt)	11–14 April	Successful Australian raid on Ottoman forces
1916	Irish revolutionary period	Easter Rising	(United Kingdom of Great Britain and Ireland)	24 April	Irish rebellion against the British occupation centered in Dublin
1916	World War I	Battle of Bondoa Irangi	(German East Africa)	7–10 May	Germany defeats the UK (South Africa)
1916	World War I	Battle of Asiago	(Kingdom of Italy)	15 May – 10 June	Massive Austrian counter-offensive against Italy
1916	World War I	Battle of Jutland	At sea	31 May	Last engagement of the German High Seas Fleet. Inconclusive battle between the UK and Germany
1916	World War I	Brusilov Offensive	(Kingdom of Galicia and Lodomeria)	4 June – 20 September	Russia nearly collapses Austria but losses are staggering
1916	World War I	2nd Battle of Albert	(France)	1 July	Opening day of the Allied offensive against Germany, known as the Battle of the Somme. Allies consisted out of the UK (including Newfoundland) and France.
1916	World War I	Battle of the Somme	(France)	1 July – 18 November	Inconclusive major Allied (the UK and France) offensive on the Western Front against Germany
1916	World War I	Battle of Erzincan	(Turkey)	2–25 July	Russia defeats the Ottoman Empire
1916	Banana Wars	Battle of Guayacanas	(Dominican Republic)	3 July	The USA defeats the Dominican Republic
1916	World War I	Baranovichi offensive	(Belarus)	3–25 July	Germany and Austria-Hungary defeat Russia
1916	World War I	Battle of Kostiuchnówka	(Russian Empire)	4–6 July	One of the deadliest battles for the Polish Legions in Austria-Hungarian service against Russia
1916	World War I	Battle of Bazentin Ridge	(France)	14 July	British victory against Germany during the Somme offensive
1916	World War I	Battle of Fromelles	(France)	19–20 July	German victory over the British south of the rest of the Somme offensive, considered the darkest day in Australian history due to the high number of casualties.
1916	World War I	Battle of Pozières	(France)	23 July – 7 August	British and Australian forces take and hold town from Germany
1916	World War I	Battle of Romani	(Egypt)	3 August	Turkish advance on Suez Canal defeated by the British Empire (including British India, Australia and New Zealand). The Ottoman Empire was aided by Germany and Austria-Hungary.
1916	World War I	Battle of Muş	(Turkey)	3–24 August	Russia defeats the Ottoman Empire
1916	World War I	Sixth Battle of the Isonzo	(Austria-Hungary) / (Kingdom of Italy)	6–17 August	Italian victory over Austria-Hungary
1916	World War I	Battle of Mouquet Farm	(France)	8 August – 27 September	Allied powers (Australia, Canada, UK) advance toward German fortification
1916	World War I	Battle of Bir el Abd	(Egypt)	9 August	Ottoman victory against British forces
1916	World War I	Battle of Mlali	(German East Africa)	24 August	The UK defeats Germany
1916	World War I	Battle of Guillemont	(France)	3–9 September	Allied powers (UK and France) capture city from Germany
1916	World War I	Battle of Herkulesfürdő	(Austria-Hungary)	6–10 September	Romania defeats Austria-Hungary and Germany
1916	World War I	Battle of Kisaki	(German East Africa)	7–11 September	Germany defeats the UK (South Africa)
1916	World War I	Battle of Ginchy	(France)	9 September	Irish (British Empire) capture town from Germans, but suffer heavy casualties. France was also involved in the attack.
1916	World War I	Monastir offensive	(North Macedonia)	12 September-11 December	Bulgaria, Germany and the Ottoman Empire defeat France, Serbia, the UK, Italy and Russia
1916	World War I	Battle of Flers–Courcelette	(France)	15–22 September	Bad weather thwarts Allied (UK, New Zealand, Canada and France) attempt to break through German defenses
1916	World War I	Battle of Morval	(France)	25–28 September	British progress resumes after Fleurs-Courcelette, but French unable to match British progress
1916	World War I	Battle of Thiepval Ridge	(France)	26–28 September	German positions captured by Allied powers (Canada, UK, France)
1916	World War I	Battle of Nagyszeben	(Romania)	26–29 September	Germany and Austria-Hungary defeat Romania
1916	World War I	Battle of Le Transloy	(France)	1 October – 5 November	Failed attempt to capture German defenses by the UK and France
1916	World War I	Battle of Kőhalom	(Austria-Hungary)	2 October	Romania defeats Germany and Austria-Hungary
1916	World War I	Battle of Cinghinarele Island	(Kingdom of Romania)	2–8 October	Germany and Austria-Hungary defeat Romania
1916	Mafia–Camorra War	Morello ambushes	(United States)	6 October	the Neapolitan Mafia kills a number of Sicilian Mafia bosses of East Harlem
1916	Palace Coup against Lij Iyasu	Battle of Segale	(Ethiopia)	7 October	Negus Mikael, marching on the Ethiopian capital in support of his son Emperor Iyasu V, is defeated by Fitawrari Habte Giyorgis, securing the throne for Empress Zauditu
1916	World War I	Second Battle of the Jiu Valley	(Romania)	7–17 November	Germany and Austria-Hungary defeat Romania
1916	World War I	Battle of the Ancre	(France)	13–18 November	Allied powers (UK and France) advance further against Germany, final battle of the 1916 Somme Campaign
1916	Banana Wars	Battle of San Francisco de Macorís	(Dominican Republic)	29 November	The USA defeats the Dominican Republic
1916	World War I	Battle of Magdhaba	(Egypt)	23 December	Capture of Turkish garrison in the Sinai by the British Empire (UK, British India, Australia and New Zealand)
1917	World War I	Christmas Battles	(Latvia)	5–11 January	Russian offensive against Germany during Russian Christmas. Minor Russian victory.
1917	World War I	Battle of Rafa	(Egypt) / (Ottoman Empire)	9 January	The British Empire defeats the Ottoman Empire.
1917	World War I	Second Battle of Kut	(Ottoman Empire)	23 February	British forces once again take Kut from the Ottoman Empire.
1917	World War I	Fall of Baghdad	(Ottoman Empire)	8–11 March	British forces capture the city from the Ottoman Empire.
1917	World War I	Battle of Nambanje	(German East Africa)	13 March	Germany defeats the UK.
1917	World War I	Battle of Mount Hamrin	(Ottoman Empire)	25 March	The British Empire defeats the Ottoman Empire.
1917	World War I	First Battle of Gaza	(Ottoman Empire)	26 March	British fail to advance into Ottoman Palestine. Germany and Austria-Hungary helped defend on the Ottoman side.
1917	World War I	Vimy Ridge	(France)	9 April	Canada's finest hour. Canadian and British forces defeat Germany.
1917	World War I	Battle of Arras	(France)	9 April – 16 May	British forces advance but no breakthrough was achieved against Germany.
1917	World War I	Nivelle Offensive	(France)	16 April – 9 May	Indecisive Allied (France, UK and Russia) offensive on Western Front against Germany.
1917	World War I	Second Battle of Gaza	(Ottoman Empire)	17–19 April	Turkey repels British assault on Gaza-Beersheba line
1917	World War I	Battle of Istabulat	(Ottoman Empire)	21 April	The British Empire defeats the Ottoman Empire.
1917	World War I	Action of 4 May 1917	At sea	4 May	British and Australian naval forces indecisive action against German Navy and zeppelin
1917	World War I	Raid on the Beersheba to Hafir el Auja railway	(Ottoman Empire)	23 May	Australian and New Zealand forces raid and destroy Ottoman railway
1917	World War I	Battle of Messines	(Belgium)	7–14 June	British forces advance on Western Front against Germany.
1917	World War I	Battle of Mount Ortigara	(Kingdom of Italy)	10–25 June	Austria-Hungary defeats Italy.
1917	World War I	Battle of Zboriv	(Austria-Hungary)	1–2 July	Part of Kerensky Offensive; the only successful engagement of the last Russian offensive in World War I. Russia and Czechoslovaks fighting on the Russian side defeat Austria-Hungary.
1917	World War I	Battle of Aqaba	(Ottoman Empire)	6 July	The Kingdom of Hejaz and the UK defeat the Ottoman Empire.
1917	World War I	Battle of Passchendaele	(Belgium)	31 July – 10 November	Also known as Third Battle of Ypres, the three-month battle costs Britain 400,000. Indecisive battle of the Allies (British Empire, France and Belgium) versus Germany. Enormous casualties on both sides.
1917	World War I	Battle of Pilckem Ridge	(Belgium)	31 July – 2 August	Allied (British Empire and France) victory over German forces
1917	World War I	Battle of Langemarck	(Belgium)	16–18 August	Indecisive battle between Anglo-French forces and German forces
1917	World War I	Riga offensive	(Latvia)	1–5 September	Germany captures Riga from Russia
1917	World War I	Battle of the Menin Road Ridge	(Belgium)	20–26 September	British Empire victory over German
1917	World War I	Battle of Broodseinde	(Belgium)	4 October	British, Australian, New Zealand victory against German forces on the Western Front
1917	World War I	Battle of Poelcappelle	(Belgium)	9 October	Australian and British forces fight inconclusive battle against German forces
1917	World War I	Operation Albion	(Estonia)	12–20 October	Germany captures the West Estonian archipelago from Russia
1917	World War I	Battle of Wadi Musa	(Ottoman Empire)	23 October	The Kingdom of Hejaz defeats the Ottoman Empire.
1917	World War I	Battle of Caporetto	(Austria-Hungary)	24 October – 19 November	Also known as the Twelfth Battle of the Isonzo; Italians defeated by Central Powers (Austria-Hungary and Germany) and driven back to Venice
1917	World War I	Second Battle of Passchendaele	(Belgium)	26 October – 10 November	Allied (British Empire, France and Belgium) victory over Germans on Western Front
1917	World War I	Battle of Beersheba	(Ottoman Empire)	31 October	Australian Light Horse capture Beersheba. British and Arabs defeat the Ottoman Empire and Germany.
1917	World War I	Battle of Tel el Khuweilfe	(Ottoman Empire)	1–6 November	British forces defeat Ottoman forces
1917	World War I	Third Battle of Gaza	(Ottoman Empire)	1–7 November	British break Turkish defensive line in southern Palestine
1917	World War I	Battle of Hareira and Sheria	(Ottoman Empire)	6–7 November	British, Australian, New Zealand forces Ottoman Army
1917	World War I	Battle of Mughar Ridge	(Ottoman Empire)	13 November	British forces gain victory over Ottoman forces
1917	World War I	Battle of Ayun Kara	(Ottoman Empire)	14 November	The British Empire (New Zealand) defeats the Ottoman Empire.
1917	World War I	Second Battle of Heligoland Bight	At sea	17 November	Indecisive naval battle, Germans lose one torpedo boat against the UK.
1917	World War I	Battle of Cambrai	(France)	20 November – 7 December	First successful use of tanks. The British Empire, France and the USA versus Germany.
1917	World War I	Battle of Ngomano	(Portuguese Mozambique)	25 November	Germans defeat Portuguese and launch invasion of Portuguese East Africa
1917	World War I	Battle of Polygon Wood	(Belgium)	26 September – 3 October	Australian and British forces defeat German forces
1917	World War I	Battle of Buqqar Ridge	(Ottoman Empire)	27 October	British and Australian victory over Ottoman forces
1917	World War I	Battle of Jerusalem	(Ottoman Empire)	17 November – 30 December	British forces capture Jerusalem from the Ottoman Empire
1917	World War I	Occupation of Kharkiv	(Russian Soviet Federative Socialist Republic)	17 December 1917 – 10 January 1918	Soviet victory over Ukraine.
1918	Finnish Civil War	Battle of Kämärä	(Finland)	27 January	The Finnish Socialist Workers' Republic defeats the Finnish White Guard.
1918	World War I	Battle of Kruty	(Ukrainian People's Republic)	29–30 January	Ukrainian victory over Soviet Russia, enables Treaty of Brest-Litovsk
1918	Ukrainian-Soviet War	Kiev Arsenal January Uprising	(Ukrainian People's Republic)	29 January-4 February	Ukrainian People's Republic quells Bolshevik uprising, but starts Battle of Kiev (1918)
1918	Finnish Civil War	Battle of Vilppula	(Finland)	31 January – 18 March	The Finnish White Guard defeats the Finnish Socialist Workers' Republic.
1918	World War I	Battle of Bobruysk	(Russian Republic)	2 February – 11 March	Units of the Polish I Corps in Russia, fought with the Red Army over the control of the city of Babruysk. Polish victory.
1918	World War I	First Battle of Kiev	(Russian Republic) / (Ukrainian People's Republic)	5–8 February	Bolsheviks capture Kyiv from the Ukrainian People's Republic.
1918	Finnish Civil War	Battle of Ruovesi	(Finland)	5 February – 19 March	The Finnish White Guard defeats the Finnish Socialist Workers' Republic and Soviet Russia.
1918	Finnish Civil War	Battle of Antrea	(Finland)	11 February – 25 April	The Finnish White Guard defeats the Finnish Socialist Workers' Republic and Soviet Russia.
1918	World War I	Battle of Rarańcza	(Austria-Hungary)	15–16 February	The Polish Legions defeat Austria-Hungary.
1918	World War I	Operation Faustschlag	(Ukraine) / (Belarus) / (Latvia) / (Estonia)	18 February-3 March	Germany, Austria-Hungary and Ukraine capture huge territories from Soviet Russia
1918	World War I	Capture of Jericho	(Ottoman Empire)	19–20 February	Australians capture Jericho from Ottoman forces
1918	Finnish Civil War	Battle of Varkaus	(Finland)	19–21 February	The Finnish White Guard defeats the Finnish Socialist Workers' Republic.
1918	Finnish Civil War	Battle of Rautu	(Finland)	21 February – 5 April	The Finnish White Guard defeats the Finnish Socialist Workers' Republic and Soviet Russia.
1918	World War I	Battle of Tell 'Asur	(Ottoman Empire)	8–12 March	British and Australian forces defeat Ottoman forces
1918	World War I	Battle of Bakhmach	(Ukrainian People's Republic)	8–13 March	Czechoslovak Legion escape German encirclement. Czechoslovaks and Soviet Russia defeat Germany and Austria-Hungary.
1918	Finnish Civil War	Battle of Tampere	(Finland)	8 March – 6 April	The bloodiest battle in Finnish history at the time. The Finnish White Guard and the Swedish Brigade defeat the Finnish Socialist Workers' Republic.
1918	World War I	Battle of Charah	(Iran)	12–17 March	Assyrian volunteers defeat the Kurdish Shekak tribe
1918	Finnish Civil War	Battle of Länkipohja	(Finland)	16 March	The Finnish White Guard defeats the Finnish Socialist Workers' Republic.
1918	World War I	First Battle of Villers-Bretonneux	(France)	20 March – 5 April	Australian victory over German forces
1918	World War I	First Transjordan attack on Amman	(Ottoman Empire)	21 March –2 April	Ottoman forces defeat British forces
1918	World War I	First Battle of Amman	(Ottoman Empire)	27–31 March	Ottoman victory over British forces
1918	World War I	First Battle of Morlancourt	(France)	28–30 March	Australians led by John Monash defeat Germans
1918	World War I	Battle of the Avre	(France)	4–5 April	German attack fought between German forces and defending Australian and British forces
1918	World War I	Second Battle of Dernancourt	(France)	5 April	Australian forces halt German advance on Amiens
1918	World War I	Battle of Suldouze	(Iran)	8–13 April	Assyrian volunteers defeat the Ottoman Empire
1918	Finnish Civil War	Battle of Ahvenkoski	(Finland)	10 April – 5 May	Germany and the Finnish White Guard defeat the Finnish Socialist Workers' Republic.
1918	Finnish Civil War	Battle of Helsinki	(Finland)	12–13 April	Germany and the Finnish White Guard defeat the Finnish Socialist Workers' Republic.
1918	World War I, Russian Civil War, Ukrainian–Soviet War	Crimea Operation	(Taurida Soviet Socialist Republic)	13–25 April	Germans, Ukrainians, and Crimeans invade Crimea, cause dissolution of the Taurida Soviet Socialist Republic
1918	Finnish Civil War	Battle of Lahti	(Finland)	19 April – 1 May	Germany and the Finnish White Guard defeat the Finnish Socialist Workers' Republic.
1918	World War I	Second Battle of Villers-Bretonneux	(France)	24–25 April	Australian forces capture the town. The British Empire and the French Empire defeat Germany.
1918	Finnish Civil War	Battle of Vyborg	(Finland)	24–29 April	The Finnish White Guard defeat the Finnish Socialist Workers' Republic.
1918	Finnish Civil War	Battle of Viipuri	(Finland)	24-29 April	Finnish White Guard once again defeats Finnish Red Guards, after which Whites initiate Viipuri massacre.
1918	Finnish Civil War	Battle of Syrjäntaka	(Finland)	28–29 April	The Finnish Socialist Workers' Republic defeats Germany.
1918	World War I	Second Battle of Morlancourt	(France)	4–14 May	Australian victory over German forces on Western Front
1918	World War I	Battle of Cantigny	(France)	28 May	U.S. 1st Infantry Division wins in first independent action with French aid against Germany.
1918	World War I	Third Battle of Morlancourt	(France)	10 June	Australian forces defeat German forces
1918	Russian Civil War	Battle of Barnaul	(Russian Soviet Federative Socialist Republic)	13–15 June	White Russian and Czechoslovak victory over Soviet Russia.
1918	World War I	Battle of the Piave River	(Kingdom of Italy)	15–23 June	Downfall of Austria against an allied army from Italy, France, the UK and the USA.
1918	World War I	Battle of Belleau Wood	(France)	25 June	U.S. 2nd Marine Division capture woods. Victory of the USA, France and the UK against Germany.
1918	World War I	Battle of Hamel	(France)	4 July	Australian success with departure from massed frontal assaults, birth of 20th-century combined arms warfare. The British Empire, the USA and France defeat Germany.
1918	World War I	Battle of Abu Tellul	(Ottoman Empire)	14 July	British, Australian and Indian forces successfully defend against German/Ottoman attacks
1918	World War I	Second Battle of the Marne	(France)	15–18 July	French troops, helped by American and British troops, win a great and decisive victory against Germans armies and saved Paris. 95,000 French soldiers killed or wounded, 12,000 Americans killed or wounded and 12,000 British killed or wounded. 180,000 Germans soldiers killed or wounded.
1918	World War I	Battle of Chateau Thierry	(France)	18 July	France, the USA and Belgium defeat Germany.
1918	World War I	Capture of Kazan by the White Army	(Russian Soviet Federative Socialist Republic)	5–7 August	White Army and Czechoslovaks captures Kazan from Soviet Russia.
1918	World War I	Battle of Amiens	(France)	8–11 August	British force Germans to von Hindenburg's line
1918	World War I	Hundred Days Offensive	(France) / (Belgium)	8 August –11 November	Last major Allied (France, British Empire, the USA, Belgium, Italy, Portugal and Siam (modern Thailand)) offensive on the Western Front and the near collapse of the Imperial German Army. Austria-Hungary fought on the German side.
1918	World War I	Battle of Lake Baikal	(Russian Soviet Federative Socialist Republic)	16 August	Czechoslovak forces defeat Reds
1918	World War I	Battle of the Ailette	(France)	17–23 August	France defeats Germany.
1918	World War I	Second Battle of the Somme	(France)	21 August – 2 September	Allied (British Empire and the USA) victory over German forces
1918	Armenian–Azerbaijani war, World War I, Russian Civil War	Battle of Baku	(Azerbaijan)	26 August – 14 September	The Army of Islam of Ottoman Empire and Azerbaijan Democratic Republic captures the city of Baku from the Centrocaspian Dictatorship. The Centrocaspian Dictatorship was aided by the UK and White Russia.
1918	Mexican Revolution, World War I, Mexican Border War	Battle of Ambos Nogales	(Mexico)	27 August	Americans defeat Mexicans
1918	World War I	Battle of Mont Saint-Quentin	(France)	31 August –3 September	Australian forces capture Mont Saint-Quentin from Germany, General Rawlinson calls it the greatest military achievement of the war
1918	Russian Civil War	Kazan Operation	(Russian Soviet Federative Socialist Republic)	5–10 September	Second battle of Kazan, Red Army recaptures the city from White Russia and Czechoslovaks.
1918	World War I	Battle of Havrincourt	(France)	12 September	British victory, German morale begins to weaken
1918	World War I	Battle of Saint-Mihiel	(France)	12–19 September	Americans defeat Germans
1918	World War I	Vardar offensive	(North Macedonia)	15–29 September	Serbia, France, the UK, Greece and Italy defeat Bulgaria and Germany
1918	World War I	Battle of Épehy	(France)	18 September	British and Australians defeat Germans
1918	World War I	Battle of Tulkarm	(Ottoman Empire)	19 September	British Empire victory over Ottomans
1918	World War I	Battle of Tabsor	(Ottoman Empire)	19–20 September	British Empire victory over Ottomans
1918	World War I	Battle of Megiddo	(Ottoman Empire)	19–25 September	Allenby's British forces crush Ottoman Army
1918	World War I	Battle of Sharon	(Ottoman Empire)	19–25 September	British Empire victory over Ottoman Empire
1918	World War I	Battle of Nablus	(Ottoman Empire)	19–25 September	British Empire victory over Ottoman Empire
1918	World War I	Capture of Jenin	(Ottoman Empire)	20 September	Australian and British forces capture Jenin from the Ottoman Empire
1918	World War I	Second Battle of Amman	(Ottoman Empire)	25 September	British forces land victory over Ottoman forces
1918	World War I	Capture of Damascus	(Ottoman Empire)	26 September – 1 October	Australian Light Horse capture the city of Damascus from Ottoman forces
1918	World War I	Battle of Meuse	(France)	26 September – 11 November	Argonne Forest, largest AEF action of the war; Allied victory. On 8 October, Corporal Alvin York, outnumbered 19:1, leads capture of German machine-gun nest. France, the USA and Siam defeat Germany.
1918	World War I	Battle of Jisr Benat Yakub	(Ottoman Empire)	27 September	Australian and British forces defeat Ottoman forces
1918	World War I	Battle of St Quentin Canal	(France)	29 September – 10 October	British, Australian and American forces decisive Allied victory over German forces
1918	Ukrainian War of Independence	Battle of Dibrivka	(German Empire)	30 September	Ukrainian anarchists defeat Austro-German forces.
1918	World War I	Battle of Durazzo	At sea	2 October	Allied (Italy, Albania, the British Empire and the USA) naval forces defeat Austro-Hungarian naval forces
1918	World War I	Pursuit to Haritan	(Ottoman Empire)	3–27 October	British forces defeat Ottoman forces final phase of the Middle East Campaign
1918	World War I	Battle of Vittorio Veneto	(Kingdom of Italy)	24 October – 3 November	Italy, the UK, France and the USA defeat Austria-Hungary.
1918	World War I	Battle of Aleppo	(Ottoman Empire)	25 October	Allied (Kingdom of Hejaz and the British Empire) victory against Ottoman/German forces
1918	World War I	Charge at Haritan	(Ottoman Empire)	26 October	Ottoman victory.
1918	World War I	Second Battle of the Sambre	(France)	4 November	Allied power victory during final phase of World War I. The British Empire, France and the USA versus Germany.
1918	Polish–Ukrainian War	Battle of Przemyśl	(Austria-Hungary)	11–12 November	Polish forces capture town from Ukrainians
1918	Russian Civil War	Battle of Tulgas	(Russian Soviet Federative Socialist Republic)	11–14 November	The British Empire, the USA and White Russia defeat Soviet Russia.
1918	Estonian War of Independence	Battle of Narva	(Estonia)	28 November	Red Army captures Narva isthmus.
1918	Russian Civil War	First North Caucasus Operation	(Russian Soviet Federative Socialist Republic)	December 1918 – January 1919	Whites capture all of the Northern Caucasus minus Astrakhan from Soviet Russia.
1919	Ukrainian–Soviet War, Ukrainian War of Independence	Khotyn Uprising	(Kingdom of Romania) / (Ukrainian People's Republic)	7 January – 1 February	Ukrainian uprising in Romania fails
1919	Greater Poland uprising	Battle of Ławica	(Weimar Republic)	9 January	Poland defeats Germany
1919	Russian Civil War	Battle for the Donbas	(Ukrainian People's Republic)	12 January – 31 May	White Army victory. South Russia, the Don Republic and the Kuban People's Republic defeat Soviet Russia and the Makhnovshchina.
1919	Estonian War of Independence	Battle of Utria	(Estonia)	17–20 January	Estonian victory over Soviet Russia
1919	Estonian War of Independence	Battle of Laagna	(Estonia)	18 January	Estonian victory over Soviet Russia
1919	Soviet–Ukrainian War, Russian Civil War	Second Battle of Kiev	(Ukrainian People's Republic)	18 January – 5 February	Soviets capture Kyiv from Ukraine.
1919	Russian Civil War	Battle of Shenkursk	(Russian Soviet Federative Socialist Republic)	19–25 January	Soviet Russia defeats the UK, the USA, the Provisional Government of the Northern Region and Canada.
1919	Russian Civil War	Battle of Vystavka	(Russian Soviet Federative Socialist Republic)	27 January – early March	Bolsheviks defeat Americans
1919	Polish–Czechoslovak War	Battle of Skoczów	(Second Polish Republic)	28–30 January	indecisive battle
1919	Estonian War of Independence	Battle of Paju	(Estonia)	31 January	Estonians and Finnish volunteers defeat the Red Latvian Riflemen in southern Estonia
1919	Polish-Soviet War	Battle of Bereza Kartuska	(Second Polish Republic)	14 February	Polish victory, first battle of the Polish–Bolshevik War
1919	Hungarian–Romanian War	Battle of Zalău	(Romania)	23-26 February	Inconclusive battle between Hungary and Romania.
1919	1919 Egyptian revolution	British crackdown on the Egyptian revolution	(Egypt)	15–31 March	800 Egyptians, 30 British soldiers and 31 Europeans killed, Saad Zaghlul released from exile and allowed to return to Egypt.
1919	1919 Egyptian revolution	Minya train ambush	(Egypt)	18 March	a group of villagers ambushed a train transporting British soldiers in Minya killing at least 7 soldiers, Britain launched reprisal attacks on nearby villages .
1919	Russian Civil War	Battle of Mariupol	(Ukrainian Soviet Socialist Republic)	19–27 March	Soviets and Makhnovists capture Mariupol from White Russia
1919	Russian Civil War	Battle of Bolshie Ozerki	(Russian Soviet Federative Socialist Republic)	31 March – 2 April	The UK, the USA, the Provisional Government of the Northern Region and Poland defeat Soviet Russia.
1919	Polish–Soviet War	Battle of Lida	(Belarus)	16–17 April	Poland defeats Soviet Russia
1919	Czechoslovak-Hungarian War	Battle of Salgótarján	(Kingdom of Hungary)	30 April – 30 May	Hungarian Soviet Republic repels Czechoslovak attacks on Salgótarján
1919	Ukrainian War of Independence	Hryhoriv Uprising	(Ukrainian Soviet Socialist Republic)	7 May – 27 July	Uprising against Soviet Russia fails, Nykyfor Hryhoriv assassinated by Nestor Makhno
1919	Ukrainian War of Independence	Battle of Mospyne	(Ukrainian Soviet Socialist Republic)	13 May	White Army defeats Makhnovists
1919	Greco-Turkish War	Greek landing at Smyrna	(Ottoman Empire)	15 May	Greeks capture Smyrna
1919	Greco-Turkish War	Urla clashes	(Ottoman Empire)	16–17 May	Greek forces enter Urla
1919	Russian Civil War	Battle of Alexandrovsky Fort	(Russian Soviet Federative Socialist Republic)	21 May	The UK and White Russia defeat Soviet Russia
1919	1919 Egyptian revolution	Black Hand insurgency in Egypt	(Egypt)	1919–1925	the Black Hand group carry out various attacks on British targets in Egypt, most notably the assassination of Major General Lee Stack; a number of the members were executed in 1925 and the group died down.
1919	Mexican Revolution, Mexican Border War	Third Battle of Ciudad Juarez	(Mexico) / (United States)	15–16 June	Americans and Carrancistas defeat Villistas
1919	Greco-Turkish War	Malgaç Raid	(Ottoman Empire)	15–16 June	Turkish rebels capture Greek weaponry
1919	Greco-Turkish War	Battle of Bergama	(Ottoman Empire)	15–20 June	Greeks capture Bergama
1919	Greco-Turkish War	Raid on Erbeyli	(Ottoman Empire)	20–21 June	Greek victory
1919	Russian Civil War	First Kharkiv Operation	(Ukrainian Soviet Socialist Republic)	20–25 June	White Army captures Kharkiv from Soviet Russia
1919	Greco-Turkish War	Raid on Erikli	(Ottoman Empire)	21–22 June	Greek forces leave the village of Erikli
1919	Estonian War of Independence, Latvian War of Independence	Battle of Cēsis	(Latvia)	23 June	Estonian and Latvian victory over the German Landeswehr
1919	Russian Civil War	Battle of Romanovka	(Russian Soviet Federative Socialist Republic)	25 June	The USA defeats Soviet Russia
1919	Greco-Turkish War	Battle of Tellidede	(Ottoman Empire)	25–26 June	Greek forces capture Tellidede
1919	Greco-Turkish War	Battle of Aydın	(Ottoman Empire)	27 June – 4 July	Greeks capture Aydın
1919	Russian Civil War	Advance on Moscow	(Russian Soviet Federative Socialist Republic)	3 July – 18 November	Beginning of the end of Armed Forces of South Russia. Victory for Soviet Russia.
1919	Russian Civil War	Battle of Novo Litovoskaya	(Russian Soviet Federative Socialist Republic)	7 August	U.S. forces defeat Bolsheviks
1919	Russian Civil War	Capture of Kiev by the White Army	(Ukrainian Soviet Socialist Republic)	31 August	White Army captures Kyiv from Soviet Russia and also defeats Ukraine.
1919	Russian Civil War	Battle of Bogdat	(Russian Soviet Federative Socialist Republic)	25 September – 19 October	White Army victory over Soviet Russia
1919	Ukrainian War of Independence, Russian Civil War	Battle of Peregonovka	(Ukrainian Soviet Socialist Republic)	26 September	Makhnovshchina defeat White Russia
1919	Russian Civil War; Estonian War of Independence	Battle of Petrograd	(Russian Soviet Federative Socialist Republic)	28 September –14 November	White Army fails to capture Saint Petersburg from Soviet Russia. The White Army and allies consisted out of the Regional Government of Northwest Russia, Estonia, the UK, Ingria and Finland.
1919	Polish–Ukrainian War	Battle of Lwów	(Second Polish Republic)	1 November 1918 – 30 May 1919	Polish city besieged by Ukrainian forces
1919	Estonian War of Independence	Battle of Krivasoo	(Estonia)	18 November – 30 December	Estonian victory over Soviet Russia
1919	Russian Civil War	Khopyor–Don Operation	(Russian Soviet Federative Socialist Republic)	20 November – 8 December	Red victory over the Don Army
1919	Russian Civil War	Second Kharkiv Operation	(Ukrainian Soviet Socialist Republic)	24 November – 12 December	Red offensive towards Kharkiv, resulting in its capture from White Russia
1919	Russian Civil War	Third Battle of Kiev	(Ukrainian Soviet Socialist Republic)	10–16 December	Bolsheviks regain control of Kyiv from White Russia
1919	Russian Civil War	Donbas operation	(Ukrainian Soviet Socialist Republic)	18–31 December	Red Army captures Donbas from White Russia
1919	Polish–Soviet War	First Battle of Berezina	(Belarus)		Polish victory over Soviet Russia
1920	Polish-Soviet War, Latvian War of Independence	Battle of Daugavpils	(Latvian Socialist Soviet Republic)	3–5 January	Polish-Latvian victory
1920	Russian Civil War	Rostov–Novocherkassk Operation	(Russian Soviet Federative Socialist Republic)	6–10 January	Red victory, splitting the White Army in two
1920	Russian Civil War	Battle of Posolskeya	(Russian Soviet Federative Socialist Republic)	9 January	Last battle of the Russian Civil War to involve the US. The USA defeats the Red Russians.
1920	Russian Civil War	Second North Caucasus Operation	(Russian Soviet Federative Socialist Republic)	17 January – 7 April	Reds force Whites out of the North Caucasus and into Georgia and Azerbaijan, which the Reds later invade
1920	Franco-Turkish War	Battle of Marash	(Ottoman Empire)	21 January – 12 February	French troops leave Kahramanmaraş
1920	Franco-Turkish War	Battle of Urfa	(Ottoman Empire)	9 February – 11 April	French surrender, but are massacred by Turks
1920	Polish–Soviet War	Battle of Letychiv	(Second Polish Republic)	18–22 February	Polish victory
1920	Franco-Turkish War	Siege of Aintab	(Ottoman Empire)	1 April 1920 – 8 February 1921	French victory
1920	Polish–Soviet War	Battle of Koziatyn	(Ukrainian Soviet Socialist Republic)	25–27 April	Poland defeats Soviet Russia.
1920	Polish–Soviet War	Kiev offensive	(Ukrainian Soviet Socialist Republic)	25 April – July	Poles capture Kyiv and are forced to retreat by Soviets
1920	Polish–Soviet War	Battle of Czarnobyl	(Ukrainian Soviet Socialist Republic)	27 April	Poles capture Chernobyl
1920	Russian Civil War	Action of 3 May 1920	At sea	3 May	A French and Soviet ship fight. Soviet victory.
1920	Franco-Turkish War	Battle of Geyve	(Ottoman Empire)	15–17 May	Ottoman and Turkish forces clash. Victory of the Republic.
1920	Russian Civil War	Anzali Operation	(Ottoman Empire)	18 May	Soviet victory with help of the Jungle Movement of Gilan over the United Kingdom and the White Russians.
1920	Franco-Turkish War	Karboğazı ambush	(Ottoman Empire)	27–28 May	Turkish victory
1920	Polish-Soviet War	Battle of Wołodarka	(Second Polish Republic)	29–31 May	Polish victory
1920	Polish-Soviet War	Battle of Bystryk	(Second Polish Republic)	31 May	Polish victory by surprise attack
1920	Polish-Soviet War	Battle of Boryspil	(Second Polish Republic)	2 June	Polish capture Russian supplies
1920	Polish-Soviet War	Battle of Borodzianka	(Second Polish Republic)	11–13 June	Polish victory
1920	Turkish–Armenian War	First Battle of Oltu	(First Republic of Armenia)	18–25 June	Armenian victory
1920	Russian Civil War	Battle of Romanovka	(Russian Soviet Federative Socialist Republic)	25 June	The USA defeats Soviet Russia.
1920	Polish–Soviet War	Battle of Głębokie	(Second Polish Republic)	4–6 July	Soviet Russia defeats Poland.
1920	Polish–Soviet War	Battle of Chorupań	(Second Polish Republic)	13–19 July	Soviet victory over Dubno and Chorupan
1920	Polish–Soviet War	First Battle of Grodno	(Second Polish Republic)	19–20 July	Soviets capture Hrodna
1920	Franco-Syrian War	Battle of Maysalun	(United Kingdom of Great Britain and Ireland)	23 July	The French advance into Syria and defeat Yusuf al-Azmah's hastily assembled army
1920	Polish–Soviet War	Battle of Lwów	(Second Polish Republic)	July –September	Poles hold Lviv
1920	Polish–Soviet War	Battle of Radzymin	(Second Polish Republic)	12–15 August	Town changes hands twice
1920	Polish–Soviet War	Battle of Radzymin	(Second Polish Republic)	13–16 August	Polish victory
1920	Polish–Soviet War	Battle of Warsaw	(Second Polish Republic)	13–25 August	Poles defeat Red Army
1920	Polish–Soviet War	Battle of Ossów	(Second Polish Republic)	14 August	One of the rare Polish victories during the Battle of Warsaw
1920	Polish–Soviet War	Battle of Chołojów	(Second Polish Republic)	14 August	Soviet victory
1920	Polish–Soviet War	Battle of Nasielsk	(Second Polish Republic)	14–15 August	Minor Polish victory as part of the action around Warsaw
1920	Polish–Soviet War	Battle of Borkowo	(Second Polish Republic)	14–15 August	Minor Polish victory
1920	Polish–Soviet War	Battle of Sarnowa Góra	(Second Polish Republic)	14–15 August	Polish victory
1920	Polish–Soviet War	Battle of Kock	(Second Polish Republic)	14–16 August	Polish victory
1920	Russian Civil War	Ulagay's Landing	(Russian Soviet Federative Socialist Republic)	14 August – 7 September	Red Army takes control of Crimea, the last White stronghold
1920	Polish–Soviet War	Battle of Cyców	(Second Polish Republic)	15–16 August	Poland defeats Soviet Russia.
1920	Polish–Soviet War	Battle of Dęblin and Mińsk Mazowiecki	(Second Polish Republic)	16–18 August	Polish victory as part of the counteroffensive after Battle of Warsaw
1920	Polish–Soviet War	Battle of Zadwórze	(Second Polish Republic)	17 August	Polish army defeated by the Red Army forces of Semyon Budennyi
1920	Polish–Soviet War	Battle of Przasnysz	(Second Polish Republic)	21 August	Soviet victory
1920	Polish–Soviet War	Battle of Białystok	(Second Polish Republic)	22 August	Poland defeats Soviet Russia.
1920	Greco-Turkish War	Battle of Sakarya	(Ottoman Empire)	23 August – 13 September	Turkey defeats Greece
1920	Russian Civil War	Bukhara operation	(Emirate of Bukhara)	28 August – 2 September	Fall of the Emirate of Bukhara to Soviet Russia.
1920	Polish–Lithuanian War; Polish–Soviet War	Battle of Giby	(Second Polish Republic)	30 August	Lithuanian withdrawal successfully mediated by French at request of Poland
1920	Polish–Soviet War	Battle of Komarów	(Second Polish Republic)	30 August – 2 September	Poland defeats Soviet Russia
1920	Polish–Lithuanian War; Polish–Soviet War	Battle of Sejny	(Second Polish Republic)	2–19 September	Polish victory against Lithuania
1920	Vlora War	Battle of Vlora	(Kingdom of Italy)	3 September	Albanian patriots seize Vlora from Italian control in a rapid night strike
1920	Turkish-Armenian War	Second Battle of Oltu	(First Republic of Armenia)	3–5 September	Turks recapture Oltu
1920	Polish–Soviet War	Battle of Kobryń	(Second Polish Republic)	11–23 September	Poland defeats Soviet Russia
1920	Russian Civil War	Battle of Obytichnyi Spit	At sea	15 September	Red and White Army ships interact outside Berdiansk, with both sides claiming victory.
1920	Polish–Soviet War	Battle of the Niemen River	At sea	15–25 September	Poles defeat the reserves of the Red Army
1920	Polish–Soviet War	Battle of Dytiatyn	(Second Polish Republic)	16 September	Soviet victory
1920	Polish–Soviet War	Battle of Brzostowica	(Second Polish Republic)	20–25 September	Polish victory
1920	Polish–Soviet War	Battle of Obuchowo	(Second Polish Republic)	26 September	Polish victory
1920	Ukrainian War of Independence; Russian Civil War	Battle of Peregonovka	(Russian Soviet Federative Socialist Republic)	26 September	The Makhnovshchina defeat Soviet Russia
1920	Polish–Soviet War	Battle of Krwawy Bór	(Second Polish Republic) / (Lithuania)	27–28 September	Polish victory
1920	Turkish-Armenian War	Battle of Sarıkamış	(Russian Soviet Federative Socialist Republic)	29 September	Turkish victory
1920	Franco-Turkish War	Battle of Kovanbaşı	(Ottoman Empire)	10–11 October	Turkish victory
1920	Greco-Turkish War	Battle of the Gediz	(Ottoman Empire)	24 October – 12 November	Greek army captures Gediz
1920	Turkish-Armenian War	Battle of Kars	(First Republic of Armenia)	30 October	Turkish victory
1920	Franco-Turkish War	Battle of Kanlı Geçit	(Ottoman Empire)	1 November	Turkey defeats France
1920	Irish War of Independence	Battle of Ballinalee	(United Kingdom of Great Britain and Ireland)	3 November	The Irish Republican Army defeats the UK
1920	Turkish-Armenian War	Battle of Alexandropol	(First Republic of Armenia)	7 November	Turkish victory, Treaty of Alexandropol
1920	Franco-Turkish War	Battle of Fadıl	(Ottoman Empire)	20–24 November	Turkish victory
1920	Irish War of Independence	Kilmichael Ambush	(United Kingdom of Great Britain and Ireland)	28 November	Important battle in the Irish War of Independence. The Irish Republican Army defeats the UK.

== 1921–1925 ==
Year	War	Battle	Loc.	Date(s)	Description
1921	Greco-Turkish War	First Battle of İnönü	(Ottoman Empire)	6–11 January	Greek offensive stopped, Turkish victory
1921	Russian Civil War	Action of 9 January 1921	At sea	9 January	French ship destroys Russian ship in the Black Sea
1921	Turkish invasion of Georgia	Battle of Batumi	(Georgia (country))	18-20 Mar	Georgia defeats Turkey.
1921	Greco-Turkish War	Second Battle of İnönü	(Ottoman Empire)	23 March – 1 April	Turkish victory, and a turning point in the Greco-Turkish War
1921	Russian Civil War	Battle of Alexandrovsky Fort	At sea	21 May	Brits defeat Red Russians in the Caspian Sea
1921	Silesian Uprisings	Battle of Annaberg	(Poland)	21–26 May	Inconclusive batle between Polish insurgents and the German Selbstschutz and Freikorps.
1921	Racial violence in the US	Tulsa race massacre	(United States)	31 May-1 June	Mobs attacked Greenwood District, Tulsa using guns and dropping firebombs from airplanes .
1921	Greco-Turkish War	Battle of Kütahya–Eskişehir	(Ottoman Empire)	10–24 July	Greek victory
1921	Rif War	Battle of Annual	(Spain)	22 July	Near Annual, Morocco, Spanish Army loses to Rifi Berbers of Muhammad Ibn 'Abd al-Karim al-Khattabi
1921	Greco-Turkish War	Battle of Sakarya	(Ottoman Empire)	23 August – 17 September	Turkish victory, farthest Greek advance in the Greco-Turkish War
1921	West Virginia coal wars	Battle of Blair Mountain	(United States)	25 August – 2 September	Tactical military victory for US government forces over miners.
1921	Habsburg coup attempt in Hungary	Battle of Budaörs	(Kingdom of Hungary)	23–24 October	Forces supporting Horthy's regency repel Habsburg loyalists from reaching Budapest, collapsing the coup
1922	Russian Civil War	Battle of Volochayevka	(Russian Soviet Federative Socialist Republic)	5–14 February	Reds retake Khabarovsk
1922	Basmachi movement	Siege of Dushanbe (1922)	(Tajikistan)	February	Dushanbe captured by Basmachi forces under the command of Enver Pasha
1922	Turkish War of Independence	Bombardment of Samsun	(Ottoman Empire)	7 June	Samsun falls under Greek control, but Turkish forces aren't swayed
1922	Basmachi movement	Capture of Dushanbe 1922	(Tajikistan)	14 June	Soviets recapture Dushanbe
1922	Basmachi movement	Lokai valley battle	(Tajikistan)	June	Ibrahim Bek attacked Enver Pasha's troops in the Lokai Valley, inflicting significant damage, Enver Pasha attempted to flee to Afghanistan After his defeat.
1922	Irish Civil War	Battle of Dublin	(Southern Ireland (1921–1922))	28 June – 5 July	First and probably most important battle of the Irish Civil War
1922	Irish Civil War	Battle of Kilmallock	(Southern Ireland (1921–1922))	25 July – 5 August	
1922	Basmachi movement	Chagan battle	(Tajikistan)	4 Aug	Soviet forces under the command of Yakov Melkumov defeat the Basmachi force near Chagan village and kills Enver Pasha .
1922	Greco-Turkish War	Battle of Dumlupınar	(Ottoman Empire)	26–30 August	Turkish victory, final battle of the Greco-Turkish War
1922	Greco-Turkish War	Turkish capture of Smyrna	(Ottoman Empire)	9 September	Greeks withdraw from Anatolia
1923	Indian wars	Posey War	(United States)	20–23 March	US Victory, Ute Chief "Posey" killed and his corpse exhumed and desecrated
1923	Political violence in Germany	Beer Hall Putsch	(Weimar Republic)	8–9 November	Failed Nazi Party uprising in Munich, Hitler wounded and captured
1924	Second Italo-Senussi War	Sirtica campaign (1924)	(Libya)	November 1924 – March 1925	Italian victory
1924	Unification of Saudi Arabia	Battle of Mecca	(Kingdom of Hejaz)	5 December	Mecca became a Saudi Arabian territory
1925	Unification of Saudi Arabia	Battle of Jeddah	(Kingdom of Hejaz)	10 February-17 December	Jeddah became a Saudi Arabian territory, end of Kingdom of Hejaz
1925	Great Syrian Revolt	Battle of al-Kafr	(State of Syria)	22 July	
1925	Great Syrian Revolt	Battle of al-Mazraa	(State of Syria)	2–3 August	
1925	Rif War	Alhucemas landing	(Morocco)	8 September	Spanish amphibious landing including tanks and air support
1925	Great Syrian Revolt	Battle of al-Musayfirah	(State of Syria)	17 September	
1925	Great Syrian Revolt	Battle of Rashaya	(State of Syria)	20–24 November	

== 1926–1930 ==
Year	War	Battle	Loc.	Date(s)	Description
1927	American occupation of Nicaragua	Battle of La Paz Centro	(Nicaragua)	16 May	
1927	American occupation of Nicaragua	Battle of Ocotal	(Nicaragua)	16 July	
1927	American occupation of Nicaragua	Battle of San Fernando	(Nicaragua)	25 July	
1927	American occupation of Nicaragua	Battle of Santa Clara	(Nicaragua)	27 July	
1927	American occupation of Nicaragua	Battle of Telpaneca	(Nicaragua)	19 September	
1927	American occupation of Nicaragua	Battle of Sapotillal	(Nicaragua)	9 October	
1927		Battle of Humen–Shijing	(Republic of China (1912–1949))	18 November	
1928	American occupation of Nicaragua	Battle of El Bramadero	(Nicaragua)	27–28 February	
1928	American occupation of Nicaragua	Battle of La Flor	(Nicaragua)	13–14 May	
1929	Ikhwan Revolt	Battle of Sabilla	(Kingdom of Hejaz)	29–31 March	
1929		Battle of Yichang	(Republic of China (1912–1949))	11 April	
1929	Cristero War	Battle of Tepatitlán	(Mexico)	19 April	
1929	Central Plains War	First Battle of Guilin	(Republic of China (1912–1949))	15 May	Chiang-Gui War
1929	Central Plains War	Second Battle of Guangzhou	(Republic of China (1912–1949))	17–21 May	Chiang-Gui War
1929	Central Plains War	Battle of Northern Henan	(Republic of China (1912–1949))	27 May	
1929	Central Plains War	Battle of Liuzhou	(Republic of China (1912–1949))	7–18 June	Chiang-Gui War
1929	Central Plains War	Battle of Guiping	(Republic of China (1912–1949))	21 June	Chiang-Gui War
1929	Afghan Civil War	Battle Of Unai Pass	(Emirate of Afghanistan (1929))	28 June – 10 July	Hazara victory
1930	Gang Violence in the US	Castellammarese War	(United States)	25 February 1930 – 15 April 1931	Salvatore Maranzano victory
1930	Opposition to Haile Selassie	Battle of Anchem	(Ethiopian Empire)	31 March	Ras Gugsa Welle is defeated by Dejazmach Mulugeta Yeggazu, suppressing the last obstacle to Ras Tafari Makonnen's ascension to Ethiopia's throne
1930	Central Plains War	Battle of Xuchang	(Republic of China (1912–1949))	10–12 June	
1930	Central Plains War	Battle of Shangcai	(Republic of China (1912–1949))	16 June	
1930	Central Plains War	Battle of Guanghua	(Republic of China (1912–1949))	3 July	
1930	Central Plains War	Second Battle of Guilin	(Republic of China (1912–1949))	17 July	
1930	Central Plains War	Battle of Jinan	(Republic of China (1912–1949))	14 August	
1930	Central Plains War	Second Battle of Nanning	(Republic of China (1912–1949))	15 August – 22 October	
1930	Central Plains War	Battle of Xinzheng	(Republic of China (1912–1949))	5–8 October	

== 1931–1935 ==
Year	War	Battle	Loc.	Date(s)	Description
1931	Japanese invasion of Manchuria	Mukden Incident	(Republic of China (1912–1949))	18 September	Japanese forces create a pretext to invade Manchuria
1932	Japanese invasion of Manchuria	First Battle of Shanghai	(Republic of China (1912–1949))	28 January – 3 March	Ceasefire declared between China and Japan
1932	Second Italo-Senussi War	Battle of Uadi Bu Taga	(Libya)	9 Sep 1931 - 11 Sep 1932	Italy defeats the Senusiyya.
1932	Chaco War	Battle of Boquerón	(Paraguay)	7–29 September	First major battle during the Chaco War and a Paraguayan victory over Bolivia
1932	United States occupation of Nicaragua	Battle of Agua Carta	(Nicaragua)	26 September	The USA and Nicaragua defeat the Sandinistas.
1932	United States occupation of Nicaragua	Battle of El Sauce	(Nicaragua)	26 December	The USA and Nicaragua defeat the Sandinistas.
1933	Inner Mongolian Campaign	Defense of the Great Wall	(Republic of China (1912–1949))	1 January – 31 May	Japanese victory
1933	Chaco War	First Battle of Nanawa	(Paraguay)	20–26 January	Paraguayan victory
1933	Inner Mongolian Campaign	Battle of Rehe	(Republic of China (1912–1949))	21 February – 1 March	Japanese victory
1933	Chaco War	Second Battle of Nanawa	(Paraguay)	4–9 July	Paraguayan victory
1933	Chaco War	Battle of Gondra	(Paraguay)	11–15 July	
1934	Kumul Rebellion	Battle of Kashgar	(Republic of China (1912–1949))	7 January -February	Chinese victory
1934	Kumul Rebellion	Battle of Yarkand	(Republic of China (1912–1949))	April	Chinese victory
1934	Kumul Rebellion	Battle of Yangi Hissar	(Republic of China (1912–1949))	April	Chinese victory
1934	Kumul Rebellion	Battle of Kitai	(Republic of China (1912–1949))	May	Chinese victory
1934	Soviet invasion of Xinjiang	Battle of Dawan Cheng	(Republic of China (1912–1949))		Chinese tactical victory, Soviet column destroyed .
1934	Soviet invasion of Xinjiang	Battle of Tutung	(Republic of China (1912–1949))		Inconclusive, Chinese withdrawal
1935	Soviet–Japanese border conflicts	Battle of Khalkhyn Temple	(Mongolian People's Republic)	8 January	
1935	Chinese Civil War	Battle of Chishui River	(Chinese Soviet Republic)	19 January – 22 March	

== 1936–1940 ==
Year	War	Battle	Loc.	Date(s)	Description
1936	Second Italo-Ethiopian War	Battle of Ganale Dorya	(Ethiopian Empire)	7–10 January	General Graziani of Italy, attacks Ethiopian troops under Ras Desta Damtew; after over three days of slaughter, the Ethiopians break and flee
1936	Second Italo-Ethiopian War	First Battle of Tembien	(Ethiopian Empire)	20–24 January	Ethiopian forces suffer 8,000 casualties compared to Italy's 1,100
1936	Second Italo-Ethiopian War	Battle of Amba Aradam	(Ethiopian Empire)	10 February	Ethiopians under Ras Mulugeta Yeggazu counterattack the invading Italians southwest of Chalacot, but are defeated with heavy losses
1936	Second Italo-Ethiopian War	Second Battle of Tembien	(Ethiopian Empire)	27 February	Italy defeats Ethiopia
1936	Second Italo-Ethiopian War	Battle of Shire	(Ethiopian Empire)	29 February – 2 March	Italy defeats Ethiopia
1936	Second Italo-Ethiopian War	Battle of Maychew	(Ethiopian Empire)	31 March	Emperor Haile Selassie leads in person the final Ethiopian counter-attack of the Second Italo-Abyssinian War, which is a crushing Ethiopian defeat
1936	Second Italo-Ethiopian War	Battle of the Ogaden	(Ethiopian Empire)	15–25 April	Final battle during the Italian invasion of Ethiopia. By 5 May, Emperor Haile Selassie has gone into exile and Italians have declared victory
1936	1936–1939 Arab revolt in Palestine	Battle of Anabta	(Mandatory Palestine)	21 June	Mandatory British victory over Palestinians.
1936	Spanish Civil War	Battle of Mérida	(Spain)	10–11 August	Spanish Nationalist victory over Spanish Republicans
1936	Spanish Civil War	Battle of Badajoz	(Spain)	14 August	Nationalists storm Badajoz
1936	Spanish Civil War	Battle of Irún	(Spain)	19 August – 5 September	Nationalist victory over Republicans
1936	Spanish Civil War	Battle of Monte Pelado	(Spain)	28 August	Republican victory over Nationalists
1936	1936–1939 Arab revolt in Palestine	Battle of Balaa	(Mandatory Palestine)	3 September	Palestinian rebels withdraw from British
1936	Spanish Civil War	Battle of Talavera de la Reina	(Spain)	3 September	Nationalists defeat Republicans
1936	Spanish Civil War	Battle of Cerro Muriano	(Spain)	5–6 September	Nationalist victory over Republicans, the Falling Soldier photograph was taken during this battle by Robert Capa
1936	1936–1939 Arab revolt in Palestine	Battle of Beit Imrin	(Mandatory Palestine)	29 September	Palestinian rebels withdraw from the British
1936	Spanish Civil War	Battle of Seseña	(Spain)	29 October	Nationalist victory over Republicans and Soviets
1936	Spanish Civil War	Battle of Ciudad Universitaria	(Spain)	15–23 November	Spanish Republican victory over Nationalists
1936	Spanish Civil War	First Battle of the Corunna Road	(Spain)	29 November – 3 December	Spanish Republican victory over Nationalists
1936	Spanish Civil War	Second Battle of the Corunna Road	(Spain)	13 December 1936 – 15 January 1937	Spanish Republican victory over Nationalists
1936	Spanish Civil War	Battle of Lopera	(Spain)	27–29 December	Nationalist victory over Republicans
1937	Second Italo-Ethiopian War	Battle of Gogetti	(Ethiopian Empire)	19 February	Battle between the Italian occupation forces and the remnants of the Ethiopian armies. The surviving elements of the Ethiopian armies of Sidamo and Bale are encircled and destroyed by the Italian forces near Lake Shala
1937	Spanish Civil War	Battle of Guadalajara	(Spain)	8–23 March	Spanish Republican defeat Italians
1937	Foreign interventions by the Soviet Union	Islamic rebellion in Xinjiang (1937)	(Republic of China (1912–1949))	2 April – 15 October	Sheng Shicai's pro-Soviet Union regime establishes its rule over the whole territory of Xinjiang
1937	Spanish Civil War	Battle of Gernika	(Spain)	26–28 April	Nationalist leader Franco's forces capture Guernica from the Republicans, following a Luftwaffe bombing
1937	Spanish Civil War	Battle of Albarracín	(Spain)	5 July – 11 August	Nationalist victory over Republicans
1937	Second Sino-Japanese War	Battle of Lugou Bridge	(Republic of China (1912–1949))	7 July	Japanese victory over China triggers outbreak of the Sino-Japanese War
1937	Second Sino-Japanese War	Battle of Beiping-Tianjin	(Republic of China (1912–1949))	25–31 July	Japanese victory over China
1937	Second Sino-Japanese War	Second Battle of Shanghai	(Republic of China (1912–1949))	13 August – 9 November	Japanese victory over China
1937	Spanish Civil War	Battle of Santander	(Spain)	14 August – 17 September	Nationalists defeat Republicans
1937	Second Sino-Japanese War	Battle of Taiyuan	(Republic of China (1912–1949))	1 September – 9 November	Japanese victory over China
1937	Spanish Civil War	Battle of El Mazuco	(Spain)	6–22 September	Nationalist victory over Republicans
1937	Second Sino-Japanese War	Battle of Xinkou	(Republic of China (1912–1949))	13 September – 8 November	Japanese victory over China
1937	Second Sino-Japanese War	Battle of Pingxingguan	(Republic of China (1912–1949))	25 September	Japanese victory over China
1937	Second Sino-Japanese War	Battle of Nanjing	(Republic of China (1912–1949))	Early November – 13 December	Japanese victory over China
1938	Spanish Civil War	Battle of Alfambra	(Spain)	5–8 February	Nationalist victory over the Republicans
1938	Spanish Civil War	Battle of Cape Palos	At sea	5–6 March	Republican victory over the Nationalists
1938	Spanish Civil War	Battle of Caspe	(Spain)	16–17 March	Nationalist victory over the Republicans
1938	Second Sino-Japanese War	Battle of Xuzhou	(Republic of China (1912–1949))	24 March – 1 May	Japanese victory over China
1938	Second Sino-Japanese War	Battle of Tai er zhuang	(Republic of China (1912–1949))	27 March	Chinese victory over Japan
1938	Spanish Civil War	Battle of Gandesa	(Spain)	1–3 April	Nationalist victory over the Republicans
1938	Second Sino-Japanese War	Battle of Wuhan	(Republic of China (1912–1949))	11 July –27 October	Japanese pyrrhic victory over China
1938	Spanish Civil War	Battle of the Ebro	(Spain)	25 July – 16 November	Spanish Republicans launch attacks across the Ebro River. The purpose of the battle is to relieve pressure off Valencia and Catalonia. It is soon to become the decisive battle of the war, and a Republican defeat against the Spanish Nationalists, Italy and Germany.
1938	Soviet–Japanese border conflicts	Battle of Lake Khasan	(Russian Soviet Federative Socialist Republic) / (Manchukuo)	29 July – 11 August	In Manchuria between forces of the Soviet Union and Empire of Japan ends in a ceasefire.
1938	1936–1939 Arab revolt in Palestine	Battle of Beersheba	(Mandatory Palestine)	9–10 September	Palestinian rebels capture Beersheba from the UK
1939		Hungarian invasion of Carpatho-Ukraine	(Second Czechoslovak Republic)	15–17 March	Hungarian forces defeat Carpatho-Ukraine
1939	Italian invasion of Albania	Battle of Durrës	(Albania)	7 April	Italy defeats Albania
1939	Second Sino-Japanese War	Battle of Nanchang	(Republic of China (1912–1949))	15–17 March	Japanese forces defeat Nationalist Chinese
1939	Soviet–Japanese border conflicts, World War II	Battle of Khalkhin Gol	(Mongolian People's Republic)	1 May – 16 September	The Soviet Union and Mongolia defeat Japan
1939	Second Sino-Japanese War	Battle of Suixian-Zaoyang	(Republic of China (1912–1949))	24 May	Nationalist Chinese counterattack successful against Japan
1939	World War II	Invasion of Poland	(Second Polish Republic) / (Nazi Germany) / (Free City of Danzig)	1 September – 6 October	Start of World War II in Europe, German victory
1939	World War II	Battle of the Border	(Second Polish Republic) / (Nazi Germany)	1–4 September	Collective term for battles between Germany and Poland in the first days of the invasion; German victory
1939	World War II	Battle of Danzig Bay	At sea	1 September	Germany defeats Poland
1939	World War II	Battle of Chojnice	(Second Polish Republic)	1 September	Germans capture Chojnice from Poland
1939	World War II	Charge at Krojanty	(Second Polish Republic)	1 September	Failed Polish counterattack against Germany
1939	World War II	Battle of Mokra	(Second Polish Republic)	1 September	First German defeat in Poland and one of the only Polish victories in the invasion
1939	World War II	Battle of Lasy Królewskie	(Second Polish Republic)	1 September	Polish victory over Germany
1939	World War II	Defence of the Polish Post Office in Danzig	(Free City of Danzig)	1 September	Polish forces hold up in the Polish post office, but fail to defend it against Danzig and Germany
1939	World War II	Battle of Mikołów	(Second Polish Republic)	1–2 September	German tactical victory during the Invasion of Poland
1939	World War II	Battle of Pszczyna	(Second Polish Republic)	1–2 September	German victory over Poland
1939	World War II	Battle of Mława	(Second Polish Republic)	1–3 September	German victory over Poland
1939	World War II	Battle of Jordanów	(Second Polish Republic)	1–3 September	German victory over Poland
1939	World War II	Battle of Częstochowa	(Second Polish Republic)	1–3 September	German victory over Poland
1939	World War II	Battle of Węgierska Górka	(Second Polish Republic)	1–3 September	German victory over Poland
1939	World War II	Battle of Grudziądz	(Second Polish Republic)	1–4 September	German victory over Poland
1939	World War II	Battle of Tuchola Forest	(Second Polish Republic)	1–5 September	German victory over Poland
1939	World War II	Battle of Westerplatte	(Free City of Danzig)	1–7 September	First battle in the Invasion of Poland; Germany and Danzig defeat Poland
1939	World War II	Raid on Fraustadt	(Nazi Germany)	2 September	Polish forces successfully raid a German border town
1939	World War II	Battle of Borowa Góra	(Second Polish Republic)	2–5 September	German victory over Poland
1939	World War II	Battle of Bukowiec	(Second Polish Republic)	3 September	German victory over Poland
1939	World War II	Defense of Katowice	(Second Polish Republic)	3–4 September	Polish Boy and Girl Scout units irregularly defend Katowice but fail against Germany
1939	World War II	Battle of the Atlantic	At sea	3 September 1939 – 8 May 1945	Name given to the conflicts in the Atlantic Ocean throughout World War II between Allied forces, and Germany and Italy.
1939	World War II	Battle of Piotrków Trybunalski	(Second Polish Republic)	4–6 September	Polish withdrawal from German forces
1939	World War II	Battle of Różan	(Second Polish Republic)	4–6 September	German victory over Poland
1939	World War II	Battle of Tomaszów Mazowiecki	(Second Polish Republic)	6 September	German victory over Poland
1939	World War II	Battle of Pułtusk	(Second Polish Republic)	6–7 September	Poles lose Pułtusk to Germany
1939	World War II	Battle of Łódź	(Second Polish Republic)	6–8 September	German victory over Poland
1939	World War II	Battle of Barak	(Second Polish Republic)	7–8 September	Poland retreat from German Forces
1939	World War II	Battle of Wizna	(Second Polish Republic)	7–10 September	German victory over Poland
1939	World War II	Battle of Łomża	(Second Polish Republic)	7–10 September	German victory over Poland
1939	World War II	Battle of Wola Cyrusowa	(Second Polish Republic)	8 September	Pyrrhic German victory over Poland
1939	World War II	Battle of Radom	(Second Polish Republic)	8–9 September	Germans capture Radom from Poland
1939	World War II	Battle of Gdynia	(Second Polish Republic)	8–14 September	Germans capture Gdynia from Poland
1939	World War II	Battle of Warsaw	(Second Polish Republic)	8–28 September	Germany captures Warsaw from Poland
1939	World War II	Battle of the Bzura River	(Second Polish Republic)	9–19 September	Largest Polish counterattack, but it fails against Germany
1939	World War II	Battle of Kampinos Forest	(Second Polish Republic)	9–20 September	German victory over Poland
1939	World War II	Battle of Hel	(Second Polish Republic)	9 September – 2 October	German victory over Poland
1939	World War II	Battle of Jarosław	(Second Polish Republic)	10–11 September	German victory over Poland
1939	World War II	Battle of Kępa Oksywska	(Second Polish Republic)	10–19 September	German victory over Poland
1939	World War II	Battle of Kałuszyn	(Second Polish Republic)	11–12 September	Poland defeats Germany
1939	World War II	Battle of Przemyśl	(Second Polish Republic)	11–14 September	German victory over Poland
1939	World War II	First Battle of Lwów	(Second Polish Republic)	12–22 September	Germans, aided by the Soviet Union, capture Lviv from Poland
1939	World War II	Battle of Modlin	(Second Polish Republic)	13–29 September	Pyrrhic German victory over Poland
1939	World War II	Battle of Jaworów	(Second Polish Republic)	14–16 September	Poles hold Yavoriv against Germany
1939	World War II	Battle of Brześć Litewski	(Second Polish Republic)	14–17 September	Germans capture Brest from Poland
1939	World War II	Battle of Kobryń	(Second Polish Republic)	14–18 September	Inconclusive battle between Germany and Poland
1939	Second Sino-Japanese War	First Battle of Changsha	(Republic of China (1912–1949))	17 September – 6 October	Chinese forces successfully defend city; heavy Japanese casualties
1939	World War II	Battle of Tomaszów Lubelski	(Second Polish Republic)	17–26 September	Germany defeats Poland in the Invasion of Poland's second largest battle
1939	World War II	Battle of Wilno	(Second Polish Republic)	18–19 September	Soviets capture Vilnius from Poland, which is transferred to Lithuania
1939	World War II	Battle of Wólka Węglowa	(Second Polish Republic)	19 September	Polish victory over Germany
1939	World War II	Battle of Krasnystaw	(Second Polish Republic)	19–20 September	Failed Polish counterattack against Germany
1939	World War II	Battle of Grodno	(Second Polish Republic)	20–22 September	Soviets capture Hrodna from Poland
1939	World War II	Battle of Cześniki	(Second Polish Republic)	21–22 September	Polish victory over the Soviet Union
1939	World War II	Battle of Łomianki	(Second Polish Republic)	22 September	Failed Polish counterattack against Germany
1939	World War II	Battle of Krasnobród	(Second Polish Republic)	23 September	Successful Polish counterattack against Germany, and one of the last battles using cavalry in Europe
1939	World War II	Battle of Husynne	(Second Polish Republic)	23 September	Soviet victory over Polish
1939	World War II	Battle of Kodziowce	(Second Polish Republic)	23–24 September	Poles hold the town against the Soviet Union, but later retreat to Lithuania
1939	World War II	Battle of Władypol	(Second Polish Republic)	27 September	Soviets capture Wladypol (now Vladypil in Ukraine) from Poland
1939	World War II	Battle of Szack	(Second Polish Republic)	28 September	Poles hold the town from the Soviets
1939	World War II	Battles of Parczew, Jabłoń and Milanów	(Second Polish Republic)	29–30 September	Poles hold the towns from Soviets
1939	World War II	Battle of Wytyczno	(Second Polish Republic)	1 October	The Soviet Union defeats Poland
1939	World War II	Battle of Kock	(Second Polish Republic)	2–5 October	Last battle in the Invasion of Poland; Germany defeats Poland
1939	Winter War, World War II	Battle of Suomussalmi	(Finland)	30 November 1939 – 8 January 1940	First battle of the Winter War, and the most notable Finnish victory over the Soviet Union
1939	Winter War, World War II	Battle of Petsamo	(Finland)	30 November 1939 – 12 March 1940	Russian victory over Poland
1939	Winter War, World War II	Battle of Salla	(Finland)	30 November 1939 – 13 March 1940	Finnish victory over the Soviet Union
1939	Winter War, World War II	Battle of Taipale	(Finland)	6–27 December	Finnish victory over the Soviet Union
1939	Winter War, World War II	Battle of Kollaa	(Finland)	7 December 1939 – 13 March 1940	Finnish victory over the Soviet Union
1939	Winter War, World War II	Battle of Varolampi Pond	(Finland)	10–11 December	Finnish hold the pond against the Soviet Union, in what's called the "Sausage War"
1939	Winter War, World War II	Battle of Tolvajärvi	(Finland)	12 December	Colonel Talvela's Finnish forces defeat Soviet forces
1939	World War II	Battle of the River Plate	At sea	13 December	Admiral Graf Spee chased into Montevideo harbour and scuttled by the UK and New Zealand
1939	World War II	Battle of the Heligoland Bight	(Nazi Germany)	18 December	Nazi Germany defeats United Kingdom in first named air battle of the Second World War.
1939	Winter War, World War II	First Battle of Summa	(Finland)	16–22 December	Finnish attack thwarted against the Soviet Union
1939	Winter War, World War II	Battle of Kelja	(Finland)	25–27 December	Finnish victory over the Soviet Union
1940	Winter War, World War II	Battle of Raate Road	(Finland)	1–7 January	Finnish victory over the Soviet Union
1940	Winter War, World War II	Second Battle of Summa	(Finland)	1–15 February	Finnish attack against the Soviet Union thwarted
1940	Winter War, World War II	Battle of Kuhmo	(Finland)	28 January – 13 March	Stalemate between Finland and the Soviet Union
1940	Second Sino-Japanese War	Battle of South Henan	(Republic of China (1912–1949))	30 January – 1 March	Chinese Nationalists led by Li Zongren defeat Japanese
1940	Winter War, World War II	Battle of Honkaniemi	(Finland)	25–27 February	In the only tank action of the Winter War, the Soviet Union defeats Finland
1940	Winter War, World War II	First Battle of Vyborg Bay	(Finland)	2–13 March	Battle ends after a ceasefire between Finland and the Soviet Union
1940	World War II	Battle of Drøbak Sound	(Norway)	9 April	German naval attack thwarted by Norwegian forces
1940	World War II	Battle of Midtskogen	(Norway)	9–10 April	Norwegian forces defeated a German raiding party that attempted to capture King Haakon VII and his cabinet
1940	World War II	Battle of Narvik	(Norway)	9 April – 10 June	A minor Allied victory of Norway, France, the UK and Poland against Germany in the Arctic
1940	World War II	Battle of Dombås	(Norway)	14–19 April	Norwegian Army units defeat German Fallschirmjäger attack
1940	World War II	Battle of Høljarast Bridge	(Norway)	24 April	Germany defeats Norway.
1940	World War II	Battle of Vinjesvingen	(Norway)	3-5 May	Nazi Germany captures one of the last strongholds of resistance in Norway.
1940	World War II	Battle for The Hague	(Netherlands)	10 May	In the first major air-landing operation in history, the Netherlands defeat Germany
1940	World War II	Battle of Maastricht	(Netherlands)	10 May	Maastricht was a key city for the German advance; Germany defeats the Netherlands
1940	World War II	Battle of Fort Eben-Emael	(Netherlands)	10–11 May	Germany captures the fort and breaks through the Belgian line of defense
1940	World War II	Battle of Mill	(Netherlands)	10–11 May	Dutch troops manage to hold back a German battalion
1940	World War II	Battle of Rotterdam	(Netherlands)	10–14 May	German attempt to seize the Dutch city; it ends in a German victory following the Rotterdam Blitz
1940	World War II	Battle of the Netherlands	(Netherlands)	10–17 May	Germany invades the Netherlands
1940	World War II	Battle of France	(Netherlands)	10 May – 25 June	Germany takes on France; British Expeditionary Force and French Army defeated
1940	World War II	Battle of the Grebbeberg	(Netherlands)	11–13 May	A major engagement during the Battle of the Netherlands, Operation Fall Gelb. Germany defeats the Netherlands.
1940	World War II	Battle at the Afsluitdijk	(Netherlands)	12–14 May	The Netherlands hold against Germany
1940	World War II	Battle of Hannut	(Belgium)	12–14 May	Largest tank battle of the campaign. France defeats Germany in Belgium.
1940	World War II	Battle of Sedan	(French Third Republic)	12–17 May	Germany defeats France and the UK. After a quick advance, Germany reaches the English Channel and traps most of the Allied army in northern France and western Belgium.
1940	World War II	Battle of Arras	(French Third Republic)	21 May	France and the UK fail to break through German lines to end the encirclement of the Allied main armies
1940	World War II	Battle of Dunkirk	(French Third Republic)	27 May – 5 June	Escape of defeated British Expeditionary Forces. Dunkirk is captured by Germany. On the Allied side, forces from France, the UK, Belgium, Canada and the Netherlands participated in the battle.
1940	World War II	Siege of Malta	(Malta)	11 June 1940-20 November 1942	British Royal Navy and Royal Air Force defends island from 2-year-long siege by Nazi Germany and Kingdom of Italy
1940	World War II	Capture of Paris	(France)	14 June	Nazi Germany occupies Paris, the capital of the French Third Republic.
1940	World War II	Battle of Mers-el-Kebir	At sea	3 July	British Navy destroys Vichy French fleet off the coast of North Africa
1940	World War II	Battle of Calabria	At sea	9 July	British forces fight indecisive naval battle with Italians
1940	World War II	Battle of Cape Spada	At sea	19 July	British and Australian forces sink an Italian cruiser
1940	World War II	Battle of Britain	(United Kingdom)	10 July – 31 October	Germans try to bomb Britain into submission – the Royal Air Force answers with fighters
1940	World War II	Battle of Tug Argan	(Somaliland)	11 August	Italy defeats the UK and captures British Somaliland
1940	Second Sino-Japanese War	Battle of Hundred Regiments	(Republic of China (1912–1949))	20 August – 5 December	Major engagement of the Soviet Red Army against the Japanese Imperial Army
1940	World War II	Skirmish at Diosig	(Romania)	4 September	Romanian victory over Hungary
1940	World War II	Battle of Taranto	(Italy)	11–12 November	British carrier-based planes destroy Italian fleet at Taranto harbour
1940	World War II	Battle of Cape Spartivento	At sea	27 November	British Navy under Admiral Somerville fights indecisive battle with Italy
1940	World War II	Battle of Pindus	(Kingdom of Greece) / (Albanian Kingdom (1928–1939))	28 October – 13 November	Italy invades Greece, but is defeated. Greece captures parts of Albania from Italy in response.
1940	World War II	German attacks on Nauru	(Australia)	6-8 Dec, 27 Dec	Germans sink five Allied merchant ships and inflict serious damage on Nauru's phosphate-loading facilities.
1940	World War II	Siege of Giarabub	(Libya)	25 December 1940 – 21 March 1941	Allies victory

== 1941–1945 ==
Year	War	Battle	Loc.	Date(s)	Description
1941	World War II	Battle of Bardia	(Italian Libya)	3–5 January	British/Australian and Free French victory in Libya over Italy
1941	Franco-Thai War	Battle of Ko Chang	(Thailand)	17 January	A navy of Vichy France defeats Thailand.
1941	World War II	Battle of Agordat	(Italian East Africa)	26–31 January	The UK defeats Italy in Eritrea
1941	World War II	Battle of Keren	(Italian East Africa)	3 February – 1 April	Hard-fought British and Commonwealth victory over Italian forces during East African Campaign
1941	World War II	Battle of Beda Fomm	(Italian East Africa)	6–7 February	British/Australian victory over Italy forces in Libya
1941	Second Sino-Japanese War	Battle of Shanggao	(Republic of China (1912–1949))	14 March – 9 April	Chinese victory over Japan
1941	World War II	Battle of Cape Matapan	At sea	27–29 March	British Royal Navy task force defeats Italian fleet
1941	World War II	Invasion of Yugoslavia	(Socialist Federal Republic of Yugoslavia)	6–18 April	Germany, Italy and Hungary invade and conquer Yugoslavia
1941	World War II	Battle of Greece	(Kingdom of Greece)	6–24 April	Germany takes the Balkan Peninsula after Italian stalemate
1941	World War II	Siege of Tobruk	(Italian East Africa)	10 April – 27 November	German commander Erwin Rommel with a mixed German/Italian army defeated in North Africa by Allied forces (UK, Australia, New Zealand, Poland, Czechoslovakia, British Indian and Free Libyan Arabs)
1941	World War II	Battle of Vevi	(Kingdom of Greece)	11–12 April	German victory over Australians
1941	World War II	Battle of Tempe Gorge	(Kingdom of Greece)	18 April	Australians and New Zealanders slow German advance
1941	World War II	Battle of Athens	(Kingdom of Greece)	20 April	Dog-fighting air battle over Athens between the UK and Germany fought for half an hour between the Royal Air Force and the Luftwaffe towards the end of the Battle of Greece
1941	World War II	Battle of Thermopylae	(Kingdom of Greece)	24–25 April	German victory over New Zealanders and Australians
1941	World War II	Battle of the Corinth Canal	(Kingdom of Greece)	26 April	German victory over British Empire forces
1941	Second Sino-Japanese War	Battle of South Shanxi	(Republic of China (1912–1949))	7–27 May	Japanese victory in China
1941	World War II	Battle of Fallujah	(Kingdom of Iraq)	17–21 May	The UK defeats Iraq
1941	World War II	Battle of Rethymno	(Kingdom of Greece)	20 May	Australian and Greek tactical victory over Germany
1941	World War II	Battle of Crete	(Kingdom of Greece)	20 May – 1 June	German paratroopers and Italians capture Crete, suffer many casualties against New Zealand, Greece, the UK and Australia
1941	World War II	Battle of Denmark Strait	At sea	23 May	German Bismarck sinks British HMS Hood
1941	World War II	Sinking of the Bismarck	At sea	27 May	Famous German battleship is lost against the UK and Poland
1941	World War II	Battle of 42nd Street	(Kingdom of Greece)	27 May	Australian and New Zealanders halt German advance
1941	World War II	Battle of the Litani River	(Greater Lebanon)	9 June	British/Australian victory over Vichy French forces in French Lebanon
1941	World War II	Battle of Jezzine	(Greater Lebanon)	13 June	Australians defeat Vichy French
1941	World War II	Battle of Sidon	(Greater Lebanon)	13–17 June	Australians defeat Vichy French
1941	World War II	Battle of Kissoué	(Second Syrian Republic)	17 June	British Empire and Free French forces defeat Vichy French in Syria
1941	World War II	Battle of Merdjayoun	(Greater Lebanon)	19–24 June	British Empire forces defeat Vichy French
1941	World War II	Operation Barbarossa	(Soviet Union)	22 June	German invasion of the Soviet Union
1941	World War II	Battle of Białystok-Minsk	(Byelorussian Soviet Socialist Republic)	22–29 June	German victory in the Byelorussian Soviet Socialist Republic (present-day Belarus) over the Soviet Union
1941	World War II	Battle of Raseiniai	(Lithuanian Soviet Socialist Republic)	23–27 June	German victory in Lithuania over the Soviet Union
1941	World War II	Raid on Constanța	(Kingdom of Romania)	26 June	Axis (Germany and Romania) victory over the Soviet Union
1941	World War II	Battle of Brody	(Ukrainian Soviet Socialist Republic) / (Soviet Union)	26–30 June	In one of the largest tank battles of World War II, Germany defeats the Soviet Union
1941	World War II	Battle of Damour	(Greater Lebanon)	5–9 July	Australians defeat Vichy French
1941	World War II	Battle of Smolensk	(Russian Soviet Federative Socialist Republic) / (Soviet Union)	6 July – 5 August	Soviet attempt to block German Wehrmacht's advance on Moscow
1941	World War II	Battle of Kiev	(Ukrainian Soviet Socialist Republic) / (Soviet Union)	7 July – 26 September	In the largest encirclement battle of World War II, Germany defeats the Soviet Union
1941	World War II	Battle of Beirut	(Greater Lebanon)	12 July	Free French, British, Australian and British Indian forces defeat Vichy French forces
1941	World War II	Battle of Uman	(Ukrainian Soviet Socialist Republic) / (Soviet Union)	15 July – 8 August	Axis (Germany, Romania and Hungary) victory over the Soviet Union
1941	Second Sino-Japanese War	Second Battle of Changsha	(Republic of China (1912–1949))	6 September – 8 October	Failed Japanese attempt to take Chinese city
1941	World War II	Siege of Leningrad	(Russian Soviet Federative Socialist Republic) / (Soviet Union)	8 September 1941 – 27 January 1944	After a three-year Nazi siege on Leningrad, the Soviet Union defeats Germany
1941	World War II	Battle of the Sea of Azov	At sea	26 September – 11 October	Axis controls Sea of Azov; Germany and Romania defeat the Soviet Union.
1941	World War II	Battle of Bryansk	(Russian Soviet Federative Socialist Republic) / (Soviet Union)	30 September - 21 October	Nazi Germany defeats Soviet Union during the Battle of Moscow.
1941	World War II	Battle at Borodino Field	(Russian Soviet Federative Socialist Republic) / (Soviet Union)	13 October 1941 – 8 January 1942	Germany defeats the Soviet Union in October and the Soviet Union defeats Germany in January
1941	World War II	Siege of Sevastopol	(Russian Soviet Federative Socialist Republic) / (Soviet Union)	30 October-4 July 1942	Axis Powers of Germany and Romania take Sevastopol in the Crimea from the Soviets.
1941	World War II	Battle of Rostov	(Russian Soviet Federative Socialist Republic) / (Soviet Union)	17 November - 2 December	Germans forced to withdraw despite Hitler's orders, but Soviets suffer over 140,000 casualties
1941	World War II	Battle of Kota Bharu	(Kelantan)	8 December	Japanese forces capture Kota Bharu from the UK
1941	World War II	Battle of Prachuab Khirikhan	(Thailand)	8–9 December	Japan conquers Thailand
1941	World War II	Battle of Wake Island	(United States)	8–23 December	Japanese forces capture the American Wake Island in the Pacific
1941	World War II	Battle of Hong Kong	(British Hong Kong)	8–25 December	Japanese drive British forces from their Chinese territory
1941	World War II	Battle of Malaya	(United Kingdom) / (Federated Malay States) / (Straits Settlements)	8 December 1941 – 15 February 1942	Japan invades British Malaya
1941	World War II	Battle of the Philippines	(Commonwealth of the Philippines) / (United States)	8 December 1941 – 8 May 1942	Japanese victory over the U.S. and the Philippines; Douglas MacArthur promises to return
1941	World War II	Naval Battle of Singapore	At sea	10 December	Japanese torpedo craft sink British HMS Prince of Wales and HMS Repulse
1941	World War II	Battle of Jitra	(Kedah)	11–13 December	Japan pushes back British forces in Malaya
1941	World War II	Battle of Cape Bon	At sea	13 December	Italian naval defeat against the UK and the Netherlands
1941	World War II	First Battle of Sirte	At sea	17 December	Indecisive engagement between Italian and British naval forces
1941	Second Sino-Japanese War, World War II	Battle of Changsha	(Republic of China (1912–1949))	24 December 1941 – 15 January 1942	Chinese forces battle Japanese back during another Japanese attack on Changsha and claim victory
1941	World War II	Battle of the Kerch Peninsula	(Soviet Union)	26 December 1941 – 19 May 1942	Axis controls Crimea; Germany and Romania defeat the Soviet Union
1941	World War II	Battle of Kampar	(Federated Malay States)	30 December 1941 – 2 January 1942	British forces delay Japanese advance Malaya
1942	World War II	Battle of Bataan	(Commonwealth of the Philippines) | (United States)	1 January – 9 April	Japanese defeat and imprison U.S. and Philippine force
1942	World War II	Battle of Slim River	(Federated Malay States)	6–8 January	Japan defeats the UK and British India
1942	World War II	Battles of Rzhev	(Soviet Union)	8 January 1942 – 31 March 1943	A series of inconclusive battles between the Soviet Union and Germany, ending with Germany's retreat
1942	World War II	Battle of Dražgoše	(Nazi Germany)	9 January	First frontal engagement on Slovenian soil with the German occupier
1942	World War II	Battle of Tarakan	(Dutch East Indies)	11–12 January	Japan defeats the Netherlands
1942	World War II	Battle of Manado	(Dutch East Indies)	11–12 January	Japan defeats the Netherlands
1942	World War II	Battle of Gemas	(Federated Malay States)	14 January	Australians ambush Japanese forces
1942	World War II	Battle of Muar	(Johor)	14–22 January	Japan defeats Australia, the UK and British India
1942	World War II	Battle of Moscow	(Soviet Union)	17 January	Soviet defenders drive back German Army Group Centre
1942	World War II	Barvenkovo-Lozovaya offensive	(Ukrainian Soviet Socialist Republic)	18–31 January	The Soviet Union pushes Germany back in Ukraine
1942	World War II	Battle of Balikpapan	(Dutch East Indies)	23 January	Battle in Borneo, Netherlands East Indies ends with a Japanese victory over the Dutch
1942	World War II	Battle of Rabaul	(Territory of New Guinea)	23 January – February	Japan defeats Australians and occupies the first Australian territory taken by conquest in Australian history
1942	World War II	Battle off Endau	(Johor)	26–27 January	British/Australian naval defeat by Japan's navy
1942	World War II	Battle of Ambon	(Dutch East Indies)	30 January – 3 February	Japanese victory over the Netherlands, Australia and the U.S. in the Dutch East Indies
1942	World War II	Battle of Port Moresby	(Territory of Papua)	3 February 1942 – 17 August 1943	Air war over Port Moresby; Australia and the U.S. defeat Japan
1942	World War II	Battle of Makassar Strait	(Dutch East Indies)	4 February	Japanese defeat Dutch and U.S. naval force
1942	World War II	Battle of the Java Sea	(Dutch East Indies)	4 February – 1 March	Japanese wipe out Allied (Netherlands, U.S. the UK and Australia) naval squadron
1942	World War II	Abdeen Palace incident	(Kingdom of Egypt)	4 February	The British army besieged Abdeen Palace with troops and tanks forcing king Farouk to appoint a less neutral and more pro-Allies government.
1942	World War II	Battle of Singapore	(Colony of Singapore)	8–15 February	Japanese forces capture city in Malaya; British army under Arthur Percival surrenders; largest British surrender of the war.
1942	World War II	Battle of Kranji	(Colony of Singapore)	9–10 February	Japanese forces capture strait islands from the UK
1942	World War II	Battle of Bukit Timah	(Colony of Singapore)	10–12 February	Japanese defeat British Empire forces
1942	World War II	Battle of Palembang	(Dutch East Indies)	13–15 February	Japan defeats Allied forces (UK, the Netherlands, Australia and New Zealand)
1942	World War II	Battle of Badung Strait	(Dutch East Indies)	18–19 February	Japanese naval victory over the Netherlands, the U.S. and the UK despite friendly fire incident
1942	World War II	Bombing of Darwin	(Australia)	19 February	Australia hit by Japanese aerial attacks
1942	World War II	Battle of Timor	(Portuguese Timor) / (Dutch East Indies)	19 February 1942 – 10 February 1943	Japanese victory; tactical Australian victory
1942	World War II	Battle of Sunda Strait	(Dutch East Indies)	28 February – 1 March	ABDACOM naval force (U.S., Australia and the Netherlands) under Admiral Doorman defeated by Japanese fleet
1942	World War II	Battle of Java	(Dutch East Indies)	28 February – 12 March	A battle of the Pacific theatre between Japan and the Netherlands; Japanese victory
1942	World War II	Battle of Leuwiliang	(Dutch East Indies)	3–5 March	British, Australian and American forces are defeated by Japan
1942	World War II	Invasion of Buka and Bougainville	(Territory of New Guinea)	9 March – 5 April	Japanese forces invades and defeats Australian forces, capturing Buka and Bougainville
1942	World War II	Battle of Toungoo	(British rule in Burma)	19–29 March	Japan defeats China in Burma
1942	Second Sino-Japanese War, World War II	Battle of Oktwin	(British rule in Burma)	20–23 March	Japan defeats China in Burma
1942	World War II	Second Battle of Sirte	At sea	22 March	An Italian naval force attacks the escort of a British convoy
1942	World War II	Japanese Raids into Indian Ocean	At sea	31 March	Japanese raids against the British Eastern Fleet, resulting in heavy British losses
1942	World War II	Battle of Yenangyaung	(British rule in Burma)	11–19 April	China, the UK and British India defeat Japan
1942	World War II	Battle of Nanos	(Socialist Federal Republic of Yugoslavia)	18 April	800 Italian soldiers lay siege to 54 Slovene Partisans; Italian victory.
1942	World War II	Doolittle Raid	(Empire of Japan)	18 April	U.S. aircraft bomb Tokyo, crash-land in China
1942	World War II	Battle of Zhejiang-Jiangxi	(Republic of China (1912–1949))	18 April	Chinese and Japanese forces search for the surviving Doolittle Raiders; Japan defeats China and the U.S.
1942	World War II	Battle of Athens	(Greece)	20 April	Dogfight between Luftwaffe and Royal Air Force.
1942	World War II	Battle of Thermopylae	(Greece)	24-25 April	Inconclusive battle during German invasion of Greece.
1942	World War II	Battle of the Corinth Canal	(Greece)	26 April	Axis victory, Germany completes annexation of Greece.
1942	World War II	Destruction of Telavåg	(Norway)	30 April	German forces destroy entire Norwegian town
1942	World War II	Battle of the St. Lawrence	At sea	May 1942 – November 1944	German submarine U-553 sinks the Canadian Nicoya and Leto in the Gulf of St. Lawrence
1942	World War II	Battle of the Coral Sea	At sea	4 May	U.S. loses USS Lexington; Japanese win tactically but lose strategically to U.S./Australian navies. First naval battle in history in which the opposing ships neither sighted nor directly fired on one another; all offensive action was carried out by carrier-based aircraft.
1942	World War II	Battle of Corregidor	(Commonwealth of the Philippines) / (United States)	5–6 May	Last U.S. bastion in Asia surrenders to the Japanese after prolonged siege
1942	World War II	Second Battle of Kharkov	(Ukrainian Soviet Socialist Republic)	12–28 May	Soviet counterattack thwarted against Germany and the Axis
1942	World War II	Battle of Bir Hakeim	(Italian Libya)	26 May – 11 June	Free French Forces successfully delay Rommel's Italian and German advance towards Egypt
1942	World War II	Battle of Gazala	(Italian Libya)	26 May – 21 June	German commander Erwin Rommel, reinforced by Italians, defeats Great Britain
1942	World War II	Operation Anthropoid	(Protectorate of Bohemia and Moravia) / (Nazi Germany) / (Czechoslovakia)	27 May	Czech resistance fighters assassinate Schutzstaffel (SS)-Obergruppenfüher Reinhard Heydrich
1942	World War II	Attack on Sydney Harbour	(Australia)	31 May – 8 June	Japanese submarines attack Australian cities
1942	World War II	Battle of Midway	At sea	4–7 June	U.S. loses USS Yorktown; Japanese lose four aircraft carriers
1942	World War II	Battle of Pantelleria	At sea	15 June	An Italian naval force successfully attacks a British convoy (Operation Harpoon).
1942	World War II	Second Battle of Tobruk	(Italian Libya)	17-21 June	Rommel's Axis forces defeat British Eighth Army.
1942	World War II	Convoy PQ 17	At sea	27 June – 10 July	35 ships leave Iceland on 17 June for Murmansk; only 11 reached their destination
1942	World War II	Raid on Salamaua	(Territory of New Guinea)	28 June	Australian commandos raid Japanese forces; 120 Japanese killed, 3 Australians wounded
1942	World War II	First Battle of Voronezh	(Soviet Union)	28 June – 24 July	Germany and other Axis capture Voronezh from the Soviet Union
1942	World War II	First Battle of El Alamein	(Kingdom of Egypt)	1 July	British Eighth Army stops Rommel's Axis (Italy and Germany) forces invading Egypt
1942	World War II	Raid on Heath's Farm	(Territory of New Guinea)	1 July	Australian commandos attack and kill 44 Japanese
1942	World War II	Battle of Sevastopol	(Soviet Union)	2 July	Soviet city captured by Germans, Romanians and Italians after eight-month siege
1942	World War II	Battle of Stalingrad	(Soviet Union)	17 July 1942 – 2 February 1943	City besieged by Paulus' German Sixth Army; from 23 November the Sixth Army is surrounded and destroyed by Soviets; bloodiest battle in history with approximately 1.8 million dead
1942	World War II	Invasion of Buna–Gona	(Territory of Papua)	21–27 July	Japan defeats Australian forces and capture Buna-Gona
1942	World War II	Kokoda Track campaign	(Territory of Papua)	21 July – 16 November	Australia's finest hour; Australia and the U.S. defeat Japan
1942	World War II	Battle of Guadalcanal	(British Solomon Islands)	7 August 1942 – 9 February 1943	Allies (U.S., UK, Australia and New Zealand) finally take the island from Japan after a six-month battle
1942	World War II	Battle of Kokoda	(Territory of Papua)	8–10 August	Australians capture Kokoda Airfield from Japan
1942	World War II	Battle of Savo Island	At sea	9 August	Japanese sink four U.S. cruisers; HMAS Canberra is also lost
1942	World War II	Battle of Dieppe	(France)	19 August	Also known as Operation Jubilee; Allied attack on the German-occupied port of Dieppe. Allied failure helped prepare them for D-Day. Soldiers from the UK, Canada, Free French, Poland and Czechoslovakia participated in the battle on the Allied side.
1942	World War II	Battle of the Eastern Solomons	(British Solomon Islands)	24 August	Japanese aircraft carrier Ryūjō sunk by the U.S.
1942	World War II	Battle of Milne Bay	(Territory of Papua)	25 August – 7 September	Australians defeat Japanese in the first clear Allied victory over Japanese land forces
1942	World War II	Battle of Isurava	(Territory of Papua)	26–31 August	Australian forces are pushed down the Kokoda trail by Japan
1942	World War II	Battle of Alam Halfa	(Kingdom of Egypt)	30 August – 6 September	Allies vs. Rommel in North Africa; the UK and New Zealand defeat Germany and Italy
1942	World War II	First Battle of Eora Creek – Templeton's Crossing	(Territory of Papua)	31 August - 5 September	Japanese forces defeat Australian forces
1942	World War II	Battle of Mission Ridge – Brigade Hill	(Territory of Papua)	6–9 September	Japanese forces defeat Australian forces
1942	World War II	Battle of Ioribaiwa	(Territory of Papua)	14–16 September	Australians withdraw from Japanese forces down the Kokoda trail
1942	World War II	Raid on Mubo	(Territory of New Guinea)	1 October	Australian commandos raid Japanese forces killing 50
1942	World War II	Battle of Višegrad	(Independent State of Croatia)	5 October	Yugoslav Chetniks defeat Germany and the German fascist puppet state of Croatia
1942	World War II	Battle of Cape Esperance	At sea	11 October	Near Guadalcanal, the U.S. defeats Japan
1942	World War II	Second Battle of Eora Creek – Templeton's Crossing	(Territory of Papua)	11–28 October	Australians advance after being halted by Japan
1942	World War II	Battle of Goodenough Island	(Territory of Papua)	22–27 October	Australians take island from the Japanese
1942	World War II	Second Battle of El Alamein	(Kingdom of Egypt)	23 October – 4 November	Montgomery's Eighth Army forces Rommel out of Egypt. The UK, British India, Australia, New Zealand, South Africa, Free France, Greece and the US defeat Germany and Italy.
1942	World War II	Battle of the Santa Cruz Islands	At sea	25 October	Near Guadalcanal, USS Hornet sunk, but Japanese withdraw victorious
1942	World War II	Battle of Oivi–Gorari	(Territory of Papua)	4–11 November	Major Australian victory over Japan
1942	World War II	Operation Torch	(French Algeria)	8 November	Allied landings in French North Africa; the U.S., the UK, British India, Free France, Canada, the Netherlands and Australia defeat Vichy France, Germany and Italy
1942	World War II	Naval Battle of Guadalcanal	(British Solomon Islands)	12 November	U.S. defeats Japan, turning point of the Pacific War
1942	World War II	Battle of Buna–Gona	(Territory of Papua)	16 November 1942 – 22 January 1943	Australian and American forces win decisive victory over Japan
1942	World War II	Battle of Velikiye Luki	(Soviet Union)	19 November 1942 – 16 January 1943	Germans clash with Soviets; Soviet victory
1942	World War II	Battle of Brisbane	(Australia)	26–27 November	Fighting broke out in Brisbane between United States military personnel on one side and Australian servicemen and civilians on the other, The units involved were relocated out of Brisbane.
1942	World War II	Battle of Tassafaronga	At sea	30 November	Off Guadalcanal, Japan defeats the U.S.
1942	World War II	Battle of El Agheila	(Libya)	11-18 Dec	Allies of the Eighth Army defeat Axis German-Italian Panzer Army. Axis retreats from Cyrenaica to Tripolitania.
1942	World War II	Battle of the Barents Sea	At sea	31 Dec	British Navy defeats German Navy.
1943	World War II	Battle of Osankarica	(Socialist Federal Republic of Yugoslavia)	8 January	About 2,000 Germans massacre all 69 men and women of the Pohorje Battalion; Germans lose 19 men and 31 are wounded
1943	World War II	Battle of Neretva	(Socialist Federal Republic of Yugoslavia)	20 January – March	Large joint Axis (Germany, Italy, German puppet state of Croatia, Serbian Chetniks) offensive that attempts to destroy communist-led Partisan resistance in Yugoslavia, but fails
1943	World War II	Battle of Rennell Island	(British Solomon Islands)	29–30 January	Japanese bombers sink an American cruiser
1943	World War II	Battle of Wau	(Territory of New Guinea)	29 January – 4 February	Australian and American victory over Japan
1943	World War II	Battle of the Kasserine Pass	(French protectorate of Tunisia)	14–25 February	German victory over British Empire and U.S. forces in Tunisia
1943	World War II	Third Battle of Kharkov	(Ukrainian Soviet Socialist Republic)	16 February – 15 March	German victory over the Soviet Union
1943	World War II	Battle of the Bismarck Sea	At sea	2–4 March	Australian and U.S. air forces destroy Japanese convoy
1943	World War II	Battle of Blackett Strait	At sea	6 March	Two Japanese destroyers sunk by the U.S.
1943	World War II	Battle of El Guettar	(French protectorate of Tunisia)	23 March-3 April	First battle where U.S. Forces -led here by George Patton-were able to defeat Germany's tank units, but the battle's followup was inconclusive.
1943	World War II	Battle of the Komandorski Islands	At sea	26 March	U.S. naval victory over Japanese, USS Salt Lake City (CA-25) damaged
1943	World War II	Warsaw Ghetto Uprising	(Second Polish Republic)	18 April	13,000 Polish Jews are killed by German forces; uprising is defeated
1943	World War II	Operation Vengeance	(Territory of New Guinea)	18 April	Killing of Imperial Japanese Navy Marshal Admiral Isoroku Yamamoto by the U.S.
1943	World War II	Battle of Mubo	(Territory of New Guinea)	22 April – 14 July	Australians force Japan to retreat
1943	World War II	Battle of Bobdubi	(Territory of New Guinea)	22 April – 19 August	Australian forces defeat Japanese forces
1943	World War II	Raid on Darwin	(Australia)	2 May	Major Japanese air raid on Darwin
1943	Second Sino-Japanese War, World War II	Battle of West Hubei	(Republic of China (1912–1949))	12 May – 11 June	Chinese forces under Bai Chongxi defeat Japanese
1943	World War II	Sutjeska offensive	(Socialist Federal Republic of Yugoslavia)	15 May – 16 June	Failed Axis (Germany, Italy, Croatia and Bulgaria) offensive against Yugoslav Partisans
1943	World War II	Battle of Lababia Ridge	(Territory of New Guinea)	20–23 June	Australians defeat Japanese attack
1943	World War II	Battle of New Georgia	(British Solomon Islands)	20 June – 25 August	U.S. and British Empire victory over Japan in the Solomon Islands
1943	World War II	Landing at Nassau Bay	(Territory of New Guinea)	30 June	Australians and Americans defeat Japan
1943	World War II	Battle of Kursk	(Soviet Union)	5 July – 23 August	Germans attack Kursk salient at Orel and Belgorod, but are stopped by heavy Russian defenses; arguably the largest tank battle ever fought. Heavy losses on both sides.
1943	World War II	Battle of Kula Gulf	(British Solomon Islands)	6 July	Indecisive naval battle between the U.S. and Japan in the Solomon Islands
1943	World War II	Battle of Enogai	(British Solomon Islands)	10–11 July	U.S. victory over Japan
1943	World War II	Battle of Kolombangara	(British Solomon Islands)	12–13 July	American ships damaged while pursuing Japanese
1943	World War II	Battle of Mount Tambu	(Territory of New Guinea)	16 July – 18 August	Australian and American decisive victory over Japan
1943	World War II	Battle of Bairoko	(British Solomon Islands)	20 July	Japanese victory over the U.S.
1943	World War II	Battle of Roosevelt Ridge	(Territory of New Guinea)	21 July – 14 August	Allied victory (U.S. and Australia) over Japan
1943	World War II	Battle of Munda Point	(British Solomon Islands)	22 July – 5 August	The U.S. defeats Japan
1943	World War II	Battle of Centuripe	(Kingdom of Italy)	2–4 August	The UK defeats Germany in Sicily
1943	World War II	Belgorod-Kharkov offensive operation	(Ukrainian Soviet Socialist Republic) \ (Soviet Union)	3-23 August	Soviets defeat Germans and push Germans behind the Dnieper River in Ukraine.
1943	World War II	Battle of Vella Gulf	(British Solomon Islands)	6–7 August	Japanese lose three destroyers against the U.S.
1943	World War II	Smolensk operation	(Soviet Union)	7 August – 2 October	The Soviet Union captures the Smolensk and Bryansk regions from Germany
1943	World War II	Battle of the Aleutian Islands	(United States)	15 August	Japanese invade, but are repelled by American and Canadian forces
1943	World War II	Battle of Vella Lavella	(British Solomon Islands)	15 August – 6 October	The U.S. and New Zealand defeat Japan
1943	World War II	Battle off Horaniu	(British Solomon Islands)	17–18 August	Japanese naval retreat, subsequent evacuation of 9,000 Japanese men; American victory
1943	World War II	Fourth Battle of Kharkov	(Ukrainian Soviet Socialist Republic)	23 August	Soviets liberate town from Germany
1943	World War II	Battle of the Dnieper	(Soviet Union)	26 August – 23 December	The Soviet Union takes Eastern Ukraine from Germany
1943	World War II	Battle of Arundel Island	(British Solomon Islands)	27 August – 21 September	The U.S. defeats Japan
1943	World War II	Landing at Lae	(Territory of New Guinea)	4–16 September	Australians and Americans land at Lae in Japanese-held territory
1943	World War II	Landing at Nadzab	(Territory of New Guinea)	5 September	American/Australian airborne landing defeats Japanese forces
1943	World War II	Battle of Tarvisio	Italian Committee of National Liberation	8 September – 9 September	Germans defeat the Italian resistance
1943	World War II	Battle of Castle Turjak	(Kingdom of Italy)	19 September	Communist-led Slovene Partisans take the castle guarded by the pro-German, anti-communist Slovene village sentries
1943	World War II	Battle of Kaiapit	(Territory of New Guinea)	19–20 September	Australian victory over Japan
1943	World War II	Battle of Dumpu	(Territory of New Guinea)	22 September – 4 October	Australian forces defeat Japan
1943	World War II	Battle of Finschhafen	(Territory of New Guinea)	22 September – 24 October	Australia and the U.S. defeat Japan
1943	World War II	Battle of Leros	At sea	26 September – 16 November	Germans attack and force surrender of British garrison on Leros; British forces under General Tilney are forced to surrender.
1943	World War II	Naval Battle of Vella Lavella	(British Solomon Islands)	6 October	Japanese win against the U.S., both sides lose one destroyer
1943	World War II	Battle of John's Knoll–Trevor's Ridge	(Territory of New Guinea)	12–13 October	Australian victory over Japan
1943	World War II	Battle of Lenino	(Soviet Union)	12–13 October	Germany defeats the Soviet Union and Poland
1943	World War II	Raid on Schweinfurt	(Nazi Germany)	14 October	Also known as Black Thursday; air battle between the German Luftwaffe and the U.S. Air Force, German victory
1943	World War II	Battle of the Treasury Islands	(British Solomon Islands)	27 October – 12 November	Major New Zealand and American victory over Japan
1943	World War II	Battle of Empress Augusta Bay	(Territory of New Guinea)	1–2 November	Japan suffers a naval defeat against the U.S.
1943	World War II	Landings at Cape Torokina	(British Solomon Islands)	1–3 November	American/New Zealand forces defeat Japanese forces
1943	World War II	Bombing of Rabaul	(Territory of New Guinea)	2–11 November	Allied (U.S., Australia and New Zealand) air attacks against Japan in Rabaul
1943	Second Sino-Japanese War, World War II	Battle of Changde	(Republic of China (1912–1949))	2 November – 20 December	Chinese victory, Japanese use biological and chemical weapons
1943	World War II	Battle of Kiev	(Ukrainian Soviet Socialist Republic)	3 November-22 December	Soviet Red Army drives Axis out of Kiev.
1943	World War II	Battle of Koromokina Lagoon	(Territory of New Guinea)	7–8 November	The U.S. defeats Japan
1943	World War II	Battle for Piva Trail	(Territory of New Guinea)	8–9 November	The U.S. defeats Japan
1943	World War II	Battle of Sattelberg	(Territory of New Guinea)	17–25 November	Major Australian and American victory over Japan
1943	World War II	Battle of Tarawa	(Gilbert and Ellice Islands)	20–22 November	First contested amphibious landing of World War II by the U.S. against Japan
1943	World War II	Battle of Makin	(Gilbert and Ellice Islands)	20–24 November	American forces defeat the Japanese in the Gilbert Islands
1943	World War II	Battle of Cape St. George	(Territory of New Guinea)	27 November	Japanese convoy suffers heavy damage against the U.S.
1943	World War II	Battle of Wareo	(Territory of New Guinea)	27 November – 8 December	Australia defeats Japan
1943	World War II	Battle for Monte la Difensa	(Kingdom of Italy)	3–9 December	The UK, the U.S. and Canada defeat Germany
1943	World War II	Battle of Sio	(Territory of New Guinea)	5 December	Major Australian victory over Japan
1943	World War II	Battle of Arawe	(Territory of New Guinea)	15 December 1943 – 24 February 1944	Allied (U.S. and Australia) victory against Japan
1943	World War II	Battle of Ortona	(Kingdom of Italy)	20–28 December	Canada defeats Germany
1943	World War II	Dnieper-Carpathian offensive	(Ukrainian Soviet Socialist Republic) / (Soviet Union) / (Kingdom of Romania)	24 December 1943 – 6 May 1944	The Soviet Union captures Western Ukraine from Germany and enters Poland and Romania
1943	World War II	Battle of North Cape	At sea	26 December	British naval victory over Germany
1943	World War II	Battle of The Pimple	(Territory of New Guinea)	27–28 December	Australian victory over Japan
1944	World War II	Leningrad-Novgorod offensive	(Soviet Union) / (Estonian Soviet Socialist Republic)	14 January – 1 March	The Soviet Union lifts the Siege of Leningrad and liberates the area around Veliky Novgorod from Germany
1944	World War II	Battle of Monte Cassino	(Kingdom of Italy)	17 January – 19 May	Four battles, Allies (the UK, British India, the U.S., Free France, Poland, Canada, New Zealand, South Africa and Italy) finally victorious against Germany, breaking through to advance on Rome.
1944	World War II	Battle of Shaggy Ridge	(Territory of New Guinea)	19–31 January	Australian victory over Japan
1944	World War II	Battle of Rapido River	(Kingdom of Italy)	20–22 January	Germany defeats the U.S.
1944	World War II	Battle of Anzio	(Kingdom of Italy)	22 January – 5 June	After an amphibious landing near Rome, the Allied armies of the U.S., the UK and Canada are only able to break out a German encirclement after a couple of months
1944	World War II	Battle of Korsun Pocket	(Soviet Union)	24 January – 16 February	Decisive Soviet victory over Germany
1944	World War II	Battle of Cisterna	(Kingdom of Italy)	30 January – 2 February	Part of Operation Shingle – 1st, 3rd and 4th U.S. Army Ranger battalions attempted to capture the town of Cisterna, German victory
1944	World War II	Battle of Kwajalein	(Empire of Japan)	31 January – 3 February	American victory over Japan in the Marshall Islands, several Korean laborers captured
1944	World War II	Battle of Madang	(Territory of New Guinea)	February – April	Australian and American victory over Japan in the Pacific
1944	World War II	Battle of Narva	(Estonian Soviet Socialist Republic)	2 February – 10 August	Germany successfully holds ground against the Soviet Union
1944	World War II	Battle of the Green Islands	(Territory of New Guinea)	15–20 February	New Zealand forces supported by Americans defeat Japan
1944	World War II	Attack on Truk	At sea	17–18 February	Successful American air raid against Japan in the Marshall Islands
1944	World War II	Battle of Eniwetok	(Empire of Japan)	17–23 February	American victory over Japan allows U.S. forces to set up for an attack on the Mariana Islands
1944	World War II	Battle of Hube's Pocket	(Ukrainian Soviet Socialist Republic) / (Soviet Union) / (Second Polish Republic)	4 March – 17 April	Germans victorious over the Soviet Union, but have to retreat afterward
1944	World War II	Battle of Imphal	(India)	8 March – 3 July	An invasion of British India by Japan is stopped by the UK and British Indian soldiers
1944	World War II	Operation Margarethe	(Kingdom of Hungary (1920–1946))	19 March	Germany occupies their ally Hungary before Hungary can leave the Axis.
1944	World War II	Raid on Drvar	(Socialist Federal Republic of Yugoslavia)	April – May	Failed German military operation that aimed to capture Josip Broz Tito, leader of the Yugoslav Partisans
1944	Second Sino-Japanese War, World War II	Battle of Central Henan	(Republic of China (1912–1949))	April – December	Marginal Japanese victory over China and the U.S.
1944	World War II	Crimean offensive	(Soviet Union)	8 April – 12 May	The Soviet Union captures Crimea from Germany; Germany got aid from Romania
1944	World War II	Siege of Myitkyina	(British rule in Burma)	17 May – 3 August	China and the U.S. capture Myitkyina in Burma from Japan
1944	World War II	Battle of Lone Tree Hill	(Territory of New Guinea)	17 May – 2 September	American victory over Japan in the Pacific theatre
1944	World War II	Battle of Wakde	(Territory of New Guinea)	18–21 May	American and Australian victory over the Japanese
1944	World War II	Battle of Biak	(Territory of New Guinea)	27 May – 17 August	American and Australian victory over the Japanese
1944	World War II	Battle of Mogaung	(British rule in Burma)	4–27 June	The UK, China and the U.S. defeat Japan
1944	World War II	Battle for Caen	(France)	6 June – 6 August	After more than a month of fighting, the UK and Canada finally capture Caen from Germany
1944	World War II	Battle of Normandy	(France)	6 June – 25 August	Allies (The U.S., the UK, Canada, France, Poland, Australia, New Zealand, Belgium, Czechoslovakia, Greece, Luxembourg, the Netherlands, Norway and South Africa) invade northern France across the Normandy beaches (Operation Overlord); hard fighting from Cherbourg to Caen; Germans surrounded and destroyed at Falaise
1944	World War II	Battle of Villers-Bocage	(France)	13 June	Germans defeat the UK near Normandy during Operation Overlord
1944	World War II	Battle of Porytowe Wzgórze	(Second Polish Republic)	14–15 June	Polish and Soviet partisans temporarily defeat Germany
1944	World War II	Battle of Saipan	(Empire of Japan)	15 June – 9 July	American forces capture island from Japan
1944	World War II	Battle of Philippine Sea	At sea	19 June	Major carrier battle; U.S. loses 123 planes and destroys 315 Japanese planes
1944	World War II	Operation Bagration	(Soviet Union) / (Byelorussian Soviet Socialist Republic)	22 June-19 August	Eastern Front; Soviet offensive destroys German Army Group Centre
1944	World War II	Operation Martlet	(France)	25 June	The UK defeats Germany
1944	Continuation War, World War II	Battle of Tali-Ihantala	(Finland)	25 June – 9 July	Finnish stop Soviet offensive
1944	World War II	Battle of Noemfoor	(Territory of New Guinea)	2 July – 31 August	American victory over Japan, supported by the Royal Australian Air Force
1944	Continuation War, World War II	Battle of Vuosalmi	(Finland)	4–11 July	Finnish victory over the Soviets
1944	World War II	Battle of Driniumor River	(Territory of New Guinea)	10 July – 25 August	The U.S. and Australia defeat Japan
1944	World War II	Lvov–Sandomierz offensive	(Ukrainian Soviet Socialist Republic) / (Second Polish Republic)	13 July – 29 August	The Soviet Union captures Eastern Poland and Western Ukraine from Germany; Germany was aided by Hungary
1944	World War II	Battle of Auvere	(Estonian Soviet Socialist Republic)	20–25 July	Germany defeats the Soviet Union
1944	World War II	Battle of Guam	(Guam) / (United States)	21 July – 10 August	The U.S. captures Guam; 18,000 Japanese killed during American attack.
1944	World War II	Battle of Tinian	(Northern Mariana Islands) / (United States)	24 July – 1 August	The Japanese, realizing they will lose, launch a suicidal charge against Americans
1944	World War II	Battle of Tannenberg Line	(Estonia)	25 July-10 August	Germans stop Soviet attack, tens of thousands killed on both sides.
1944	World War II	Operation Cobra	(France)	25–31 July	The U.S. breaks out of Normandy and liberates Western France from Germany
1944	World War II	Battle of Sansapor	(Territory of New Guinea)	30 July – 31 August	The U.S. defeats Japan
1944	Second Sino-Japanese War, World War II	Fourth Battle of Changsha	(Republic of China (1912–1949))	August	Japanese capture nearby town from China, but unable to continue fighting afterward
1944	World War II	Warsaw Uprising	(Second Polish Republic)	1 August – 3 October	20,000 armed Poles against 55,000 Wehrmacht and SS; 90% of the city is destroyed and there are more than 250,000 casualties
1944	World War II	Falaise pocket	(France)	12–21 August	A German army gets trapped and defeated near Falaise, while the Allied armies (the U.S., the UK, Canada, Poland and France) liberate most of France
1944	World War II	Operation Dragoon	(France)	15 August	AKA Operation Anvil; Allied (the U.S., France, the UK, Canada, Australia, South Africa, Greece and New Zealand) invasion of German-occupied Southern France
1944	World War II	Liberation of Paris	(France)	15–25 August	Allied forces (France, the U.S. and the UK) drive Nazi German forces out of the French capital
1944	Second Sino-Japanese War, World War II	Battle of Guilin-Liuzhou	(Republic of China (1912–1949))	16 August – 24 November	Japanese victory over China and the U.S.
1944	World War II	Battle of Romania	(Kingdom of Romania)	20 August – 24 September	The Soviet Union breaches through the German and Romanian lines, capturing vast territories. Romania change sides from Germany to the Soviet Union. On 24 September, most of Romania is occupied by the Soviet Union.
1944	World War II	Baltic Offensive	(Estonian Soviet Socialist Republic) / (Second Polish Republic) / (Soviet Union) / (Socialist Federal Republic of Yugoslavia) / (Kingdom of Romania)	14 September – 24 November	The Soviet Union captures most of the Baltic States and enters Germany in East Prussia
1944	World War II	Operation Tanne Ost	At sea	15 September	Germans unable to capture island from Finland; Finland was supported by the Soviet Union.
1944	World War II	Belgrade offensive	(Socialist Federal Republic of Yugoslavia)	15 September – 24 November	The Soviet Union, communist-led Yugoslav Partisans and Bulgaria capture Belgrade from Germany
1944	World War II	Battle of Peleliu	(Empire of Japan)	15 September – 27 November	A fight to capture an airstrip on a speck of coral in the western Pacific; the U.S. defeats Japan
1944	World War II	Battle of Arnhem	(Netherlands)	17–26 September	The major battle of Operation Market Garden; Allies reach but fail to cross the Rhine; British First Airborne Division destroyed. Germany defeats the UK and Poland.
1944	World War II	Battle of Angaur	(Empire of Japan)	17–30 September	Volcanic island captured by Americans from Japan
1944	World War II	Battle of Hürtgen Forest	(Nazi Germany)	19 September 1944 – 10 February 1945	German Army repels U.S. forces with high losses for both
1944	World War II	Battle of Porkuni	(Estonian Soviet Socialist Republic)	21 September	The Soviet Union defeats Estonians fighting for Germany
1944	World War II	Battle of Olhava	(Finland)	28 September	Germany defeats Finland
1944	World War II	Battle of Tornio	(Finland)	1–8 October	Finns capture Tornio from the Germans; start of the Lapland War proper
1944	World War II	Battle of the Scheldt	(Netherlands) / (Belgium)	2 October – 8 November	Difficult Canadian victory secures the port of Antwerp from Germany, and ensures critical supplies for advancing Allied (Canada, the UK, Poland, the U.S., Belgium, the Netherlands, France and Norway) forces
1944	World War II	Battle of Aachen	(Nazi Germany)	2–21 October	Aachen was the first major German city to face invasion during World War II; the U.S. defeats Germany
1944	World War II	Battle of Kos	(Kingdom of Greece)	3–4 October	Germany defeats Italy, the UK and South Africa
1944	World War II	Battle of Debrecen	(Kingdom of Hungary)	6–29 October	Germans able to hold back Soviets
1944	World War II	Petsamo–Kirkenes offensive	(Norway)	7–29 October	The Soviet Union breaks through German lines into Norway
1944	World War II	Battle of Crucifix Hill	(Nazi Germany)	8 October	The U.S. 1st Infantry Division attacks and takes Crucifix Hill from Germany, a strategic point which allows the Battle of Aachen to occur
1944	World War II	Battle of Morotai	(Territory of New Guinea)	15 October	Allied (the U.S., Australia, the Netherlands and the UK) victory over Japan
1944	World War II	Battle of Vukov Klanac	(Independent State of Croatia)	15–23 October	Communist-led Yugoslav Partisans defeat the German fascist puppet state of Croatia
1944	World War II	Operation Pheasant	(Netherlands)	20 October – 4 November	The UK, Canada, Poland, the U.S. and the Netherlands liberate North Brabant from Germany
1944	World War II	Battle of Leyte	(Philippines) / (United States)	20 October – 31 December	Combined American and Philippine Commonwealth military forces including recognized guerrillas begin the liberation of the Philippines
1944	World War II	Battle of Leyte Gulf	(Philippines) / (United States)	23–26 October	The largest air-sea battle in history; American/Australian fleet destroy Japan's fleet
1944	World War II	Liberation of Finnmark	(Norway)	23 October 1944 – 26 April 1945	The Soviet Union and Norway, supported by the UK, Canada and Sweden, drive Germany from the Norwegian region of Finnmark
1944	World War II	Siege of Budapest	(Kingdom of Hungary)	29 October 1944 – 13 February 1945	The Soviet Union and Romania capture Budapest and most of Hungary from Germany and Hungary
1944	World War II	Aitape–Wewak campaign	(Territory of New Guinea)	November 1944 – August 1945	Australia victory over Japan
1944	World War II	Landing at Jacquinot Bay	(Territory of New Guinea)	4 November	Australians land at Japanese-occupied Jacquinot Bay
1944	World War II	Ili Rebellion	(Republic of China (1912–1949))	7 November – 26 June 1946	Independence of the Second East Turkestan Republic
1944	World War II	Battle of Ormoc Bay	(Philippines) / (United States)	11 November – 21 December	Americans prevent Japanese from resupplying Leyte
1944	World War II	Operation Queen	(Nazi Germany)	16 November	Germany defeats the U.S. and the UK
1944	World War II	Battle of Monte Castello	(Kingdom of Italy)	25 November 1944 – 12 February 1945	Brazilian and American troops defeat Germans in Italy
1944	World War II	Battle of Wide Bay–Open Bay	(Territory of New Guinea)	December 1944 – April 1945	Australias defeat Japanese
1944	World War II	Battle of Mindoro	(Philippines)	13–16 December	Combined U.S., Australia and Philippine Commonwealth military forces including recognized guerrillas capture main island off Luzon, Philippines from Japan
1944	World War II	Battle of the Bulge	(Belgium) / (Luxembourg) / (Nazi Germany)	16 December 1944 – 25 January 1945	German counterattack in Ardennes; General McAuliffe says "NUTS" at Bastogne. The US, the UK, Belgium, Canada, France and Luxembourg defeat Germany
1944	World War II	Battle of Pearl Ridge	(Territory of New Guinea)	30–31 December	Australia defeats Japan
1944	World War II	Operation Northwind	(Provisional Government of the French Republic) \ (Nazi Germany)	31 December-25 January	Last German offensive during World War II, Allied victory.
1945	World War II	Battle of Luzon	(Philippines)	9 January – 15 August	Filipino, American, Australian and Mexican victory. U.S. Sixth and Eighth Armies including the Filipino soldiers of the Philippine Commonwealth Army and Philippine Constabulary including recognized guerrillas retakes and completes the recapture of Northern Philippines from Japan
1945	World War II	Vistula-Oder offensive	(Second Polish Republic) / (Nazi Germany)	12 January – 2 February	The Soviet Union captures Western Poland from Germany and advances in parts of Eastern Germany
1945	World War II	East Prussian offensive	(Second Polish Republic) / (Soviet Union) / (Lithuanian Soviet Socialist Republic)	13 January – 25 April	The Soviet Union captures most of East Prussia from Germany
1945	World War II	Battle of Tsimba Ridge	(Territory of New Guinea)	17 January – 9 February	Australia and New Zealand defeat Japan
1945	World War II	Battle of Poznań	(Provisional Government of the Republic of Poland)	24 January-23 February	Soviet Union drives out German garrison in the Polish city.
1945	World War II	Operation Elephant	(Netherlands)	26 January	Canadian offensive succeeds against a German bridgehead at Kapelsche Veer in the Netherlands
1945	World War II	Raid at Cabanatuan	(Philippines) / (United States)	30 January	U.S. Army Rangers and Filipino guerrillas rescue Bataan and Corregidor prisoners of war from Japanese prison camp
1945	World War II	Battle for the Recapture of Bataan	(Philippines) / (United States)	31 January – 8 February	Combined U.S and Philippine Commonwealth military forces including recognized guerrillas retake the historic Bataan Peninsula from Japan
1945	World War II	Battle for the Liberation of Manila	(Philippines) / (United States)	3 February – 3 March	City totally devastated after month-long battle between the combined U.S. and Philippine Commonwealth military forces including recognized guerrillas against the Japanese Imperial forces; 100,000 civilians killed
1945	World War II	Rhineland Offensive	(Nazi Germany)	8 February – 27 March	The U.S., the UK and Canada capture the Rhineland from Germany
1945	World War II	Silesian offensives	(Czechoslovakia) / (Nazi Germany) / (Second Polish Republic)	8 February – 31 March	The Soviet Union captures Silesia from Germany
1945	World War II	Black Friday	(Norway)	9 February	British Empire air operation ends in defeat against Germany
1945	World War II	Battle for the Recapture of Corregidor	(Philippines) / (United States)	16–26 February	Spectacular combined U.S. and Philippine Commonwealth assault retakes island bastion from Japanese forces
1945	World War II	Battle of Baguio	(Philippines) / (United States)	21 February – 26 April	Filipino troops of the 66th Infantry Regiment, Philippine Commonwealth Army; USAFIP-NL; and the American troops of the 33rd and 37th Infantry Division retake Baguio, Northern Philippines, from Japan
1945	World War II	Raid at Los Baños	(Philippines) / (United States)	23 February	U.S. Airborne Task Force and Filipino guerrillas rescues more than 2,000 Allied POWs and civilian internees held by Japanese
1945	World War II	East Pomeranian offensive	(Nazi Germany)	24 February – 4 April	The Soviet Union captures parts of Northeastern Germany
1945	World War II	Battle of the Transdanubian Hills	(Kingdom of Hungary)	6–21 March	Bulgaria, the Soviet Union, Yugoslavia and Italy defeat Germany
1945	World War II	Battle of Remagen	(Nazi Germany)	7-25 March	Germans fail to detonate bridge, Americans cross Rhine River.
1945	World War II	Battle of Mindanao	(Philippines)	10 March – 15 August	U.S. Eighth Army including the Filipino soldiers of the Philippine Commonwealth Army and Philippine Constabulary and recognized guerrillas recapture the Southern Philippines from Japan
1945	World War II	Vienna offensive	(Nazi Germany)	16 March – 15 April	The Soviet Union captures Vienna from Germany
1945	World War II	Operation Varsity	(Nazi Germany)	17 March	134 Allied (the UK, the U.S. and Canada) gliders land troops in Wesel in Germany
1945	World War II	Battle of the Visayas	(Philippines)	18 March – 30 July	U.S. Eighth Army including the Filipino soldiers of the Philippine Commonwealth Army and Philippine Constabulary and recognized guerrillas retakes central Philippine islands from Japan
1945	Second Sino-Japanese War, World War II	Battle of West Henan and North Hubei	(Republic of China (1912–1949))	21 March – 11 May	Indecisive battle between China and Japan; Japan controls airbases after battle
1945	World War II	Battle of Iwo Jima	(Empire of Japan)	26 March	After a month, U.S. forces take main offshore Japanese island
1945	World War II	Battle of Slater's Knoll	(Territory of New Guinea)	28 March –6 April	Decisive Australian victory over Japan
1945	World War II	Battle on Lijevča field	(Independent State of Croatia)	30 March – 8 April	Total Ustashian (Croats fighting for Germany) victory over Chetniks (Yugoslav nationalists)
1945	Second Sino-Japanese War, World War II	Battle of West Hunan	(Republic of China (1912–1949))	6 April – 9 June	Chinese victory in final battle to expel Japan
1945	World War II	Battle of Bologna	(Kingdom of Italy)	9–21 April	Poland, the UK, the U.S., Italy and Brazil defeat Germany
1945	World War II	Battle of the Argenta Gap	(Kingdom of Italy)	12–19 April	The UK defeats Germany
1945	World War II	Battle of Montese	(Kingdom of Italy)	14–17 April	Brazil defeats Germany
1945	World War II	Battle of the Hongorai River	(Territory of New Guinea)	17 April – 22 May	Australia and New Zealand defeat Japan
1945	World War II	Battle of Bautzen	(Nazi Germany)	21-30 April	Last German victory in the war, although it failed to accomplish anything strategically.
1945	World War II	Battle of Halbe	(Nazi Germany)	24 April – 1 May	Part of Battle of Berlin, Germans unable to break out, Soviet victory
1945	World War II	Battle of Tanlwe Chaung	(Myanmar)	26 April	The UK defeats Japan
1945	World War II	Battle of Berlin	(Nazi Germany)	26 April – 2 May	Soviet forces encircle and capture German capital; Hitler commits suicide
1945	World War II	Battle of Triest	(Kingdom of Italy)	30 April – 2 May	Communist-led Yugoslav Partisans, New Zealand and the Italian resistance capture the city from Germany, pro-German Italians and Chetniks (Yugoslav nationalists)
1945	World War II	Battle of Tarakan	(Dutch East Indies)	1 May	Australian attack supported by the U.S. and the Netherlands as part of the Borneo campaign, defeating Japan
1945	World War II	Battle of Castle Itter	(Federal State of Austria)	5 May	Successful defence of the Itter Castle
1945	World War II	Prague offensive	(Czechoslovakia)	6–11 May	The Soviet Union captures Prague from Germany
1945	World War II	Battle of Zelengora	(Socialist Federal Republic of Yugoslavia)	10–13 May	Yugoslav communists defeat Yugoslav nationalists
1945	World War II	Battle of Slivice	(Nazi Germany)	11-12 May	Soviets defeat Germans, Carl Friedrich von Pückler-Burghauss killed.
1945	World War II	Battle of Poljana	(Socialist Federal Republic of Yugoslavia)	14–15 May	Last battle of World War II in Europe; Yugoslav communists and the UK defeat Germany and Yugoslavs, fighting on the German side.
1945	World War II	Battle of Ratsua	(Territory of New Guinea)	June – August	Australian victory over Japan
1945	World War II	Battle of Porton Plantation	(Territory of New Guinea)	8–10 June	Japan defeats Australia and New Zealand
1945	World War II	Battle of Labuan	(Straits Settlements)	10–21 June	Australia, aided by the U.S. and UK, defeats Japan in Borneo
1945	World War II	Battle of Bessang Pass	(Philippines)	14 June	Filipino troops of the 15th, 66th and 121st Infantry Regiment, Philippine Commonwealth Army, USAFIP-NL complete and retake the province of Ilocos Sur in Northern Luzon, Philippines from Japan
1945	World War II	Battle of North Borneo	(North Borneo)	17 June – 15 August	Australian victory in north Borneo over Japan; the U.S. supported Australia.
1945	World War II	Battle of Okinawa	(Empire of Japan)	21 June	U.S. and British Empire forces defeat Japanese, U.S. occupies island
1945	World War II	Battle of Beaufort	(North Borneo)	26–28 June	Australian victory over Japanese forces
1945	World War II	Battle of Balikpapan	(Dutch East Indies)	1–21 July	Australian victory over Japanese forces
1945	World War II	Battle of Sagami Bay	At sea	22–23 July	The U.S. defeats Japan
1945	World War II	Battle of Mayoyao Ridge	(Philippines)	26 July – 9 August	Filipino troops of the 11th and 14th Infantry Regiment, Philippine Commonwealth Army, USAFIP-NL, take the Japanese stronghold of Mayoyao, Mountain Province with U.S. air support
1945	World War II	Soviet invasion of Manchuria	(Mongolian People's Republic) / (Empire of Japan)	9–20 August	Decisive Russian victory over Japan
1945	Chinese Civil War, World War II	Opening Campaign	(Republic of China (1912–1949))	10 August 1945 – 10 January 1946	Chinese Civil War resumes, with three sides: Nationalist China and the U.S.; Communist China and the Soviet Union; and the Japan
1945	World War II	Battle of Mutanchiang	(Republic of China (1912–1949))	12–16 August	Japan defeats the Soviet Union
1945	World War II	Kyūjō incident	(Japan)	14–15 August	Rebels killed the commander of the Imperial Guards and attempted to occupy Tokyo Imperial Palace and undo the order to surrender, but were stopped.
1945	Chinese Civil War, World War II	Battle of Baoying	(Republic of China (1912–1949))	15–23 August	Chinese communists defeat Chinese Nationalists
1945	Chinese Civil War, World War II	Battle of Yongjiazhen	(Republic of China (1912–1949))	16–19 August	Chinese communists defeat Chinese Nationalists
1945	Chinese Civil War, World War II	Battle of Tianmen	(Republic of China (1912–1949))	17 August	Chinese communists defeat Chinese Nationalists
1945	World War II	Battle of Shumshu	(Soviet Union)	18–23 August	The Soviet Union defeats Japan
1945	Chinese Civil War	Battle of Wuhe	(Republic of China (1912–1949))	24 August	Chinese communists defeat Chinese Nationalists
1945	Chinese Civil War	Battle of Yinji	(Republic of China (1912–1949))	26–27 August	Chinese communists defeat Chinese Nationalists
1945	Chinese Civil War	Battle of Dazhongji	(Republic of China (1912–1949))	1–13 September	Chinese communists defeat Chinese Nationalists
1945	Chinese Civil War	Battle of Lingbi	(Republic of China (1912–1949))	4–5 September	Chinese communists defeat Chinese Nationalists
1945	Chinese Civil War	Battle of Xiangshuikou	(Republic of China (1912–1949))	18 September	Chinese communists defeat Chinese Nationalists
1945	Chinese Civil War	Battle of Rugao	(Republic of China (1912–1949))	21 September	Chinese communists defeat Chinese Nationalists
1945	Indonesian National Revolution	Battle of Semarang	(Dutch East Indies)	15–19 October	Ceasefire among Indonesian and Japanese
1945	Chinese Civil War	Battle of Houmajia	(Republic of China (1912–1949))	18 October	Chinese communists defeat Chinese Nationalists
1945	Indonesian National Revolution	Battle of Ambarawa	(Dutch East Indies)	20 October – 16 December	Indonesian soldiers and militia against British and Dutch troops as a part of the Indonesian National Revolution; Indonesian victory.
1945	Indonesian National Revolution	Battle of Surabaya	(Dutch East Indies)	27 October – 20 November	Indonesian soldiers and militia against British and Dutch troops as a part of the Indonesian National Revolution; British victory.
1945	Jewish insurgency in Mandatory Palestine	Night of the Trains	(Mandatory Palestine)	1 November	British infrastructure damaged
1945	Chinese Civil War	Battle of Shaobo	(Republic of China (1912–1949))	19–21 December	Chinese communists defeat Chinese Nationalists

== 1946–1950 ==
Year	War	Battle	Loc.	Date(s)	Description
1946	Chinese Civil War	Battle of Siping	(Republic of China (1912–1949))	15–17 March	Communist victory
1946		Battle of Athens	(United States)	1-2 August	McMinn County government forced to disband.
1946	Chinese Civil War	Battle of Huaiyin–Huai'an	(Republic of China (1912–1949))	21 August – 22 September	Nationalist victory
1946	Chinese Civil War	Battle of Lishi	(Republic of China (1912–1949))	6–9 September	Communist victory
1946	Chinese Civil War	Battle of Kalgan	(Republic of China (1912–1949))	10–20 October	Nationalist victory
1946	Indonesian National Revolution	Battle of Margarana	(Indonesia)	20 November	Netherlands Indies Civil Administration pyrrhic victory
1947	Chinese Civil War	Battle of Yan'an	(Republic of China (1912–1949))	19 March	Nationalist victory
1947	Chinese Civil War	Battle of Niangziguan	(Republic of China (1912–1949))	24–25 April	Communist victory
1947	Chinese Civil War	Battle of Tang'erli	(Republic of China (1912–1949))	27–28 April	Communist victory
1947	Jewish insurgency in Mandatory Palestine	Acre Prison siege	(Mandatory Palestine)	4 May	27 Irgun and Lehi members escaped, 214 Arab prisoners escaped
1947	Chinese Civil War	Battle of Baitag Bogd	(Republic of China (1912–1949))	5 June - July 1948	status quo
1947	Indonesian National Revolution	Operation Product	(Indonesia)	21 July	First of two major Dutch military Police Actions against Indonesia
1947	Indo-Pakistani War of 1947	Battle of Badgam		3 November	
1947	Indo-Pakistani War of 1947	Battle of Shalateng		7 November	
1947	Chinese Civil War	Battle of Phoenix Peak	(Republic of China (1912–1949))	7–9 December	
1947	1948 Arab–Israeli War	Battles of Kfar Darom	(Mandatory Palestine)	7 December 1947 – 9 July 1948	Egyptian victory
1948	1947–1948 civil war in Mandatory Palestine	Battle of Haifa	(Mandatory Palestine)	21–22 April	Jewish militias capture Haifa
1948	1948 Arab–Israeli War	Battle of Kfar Etzion	(Palestine)	13 May	Arab victory
1948	1948 Arab–Israeli War	Battle of Nirim	(Israel)	15 May	Israeli militants capture Nirim kibbutz
1948	1948 Arab–Israeli War	Battle of Yad Mordechai	(Israel)	19–24 May	Egypt captures the settlement despite heavy Israeli defense
1948	1948 Arab–Israeli War	Battles of Latrun	(Mandatory Palestine)	24 May – 18 July	Jordanian forces capture Old Jerusalem
1948	1948 Arab–Israeli War	First Battle of Negba	(Israel)	2 June	Israeli victory
1948	1948 Arab–Israeli War	Altalena Affair	(Israel)	20–23 June	Israel Defense Forces victory over Irgun, an Israeli civil war averted .
1948	1948 Arab–Israeli War	Second Battle of Negba	(Israel)	12 July	
1948	Chinese Civil War	Liaoshen Campaign	(Republic of China (1912–1949))	12 September – 12 November	Decisive Chinese Communist victory over the Chinese Nationalists
1948	Chinese Civil War	Huaihai Campaign	(Republic of China (1912–1949))	6 November 1948 – 10 January 1949	Decisive Chinese Communist victory over the Chinese Nationalists
1948	Chinese Civil War	Pingjin Campaign	(Republic of China (1912–1949))	29 November 1948 – 31 January 1949	Decisive Chinese Communist victory over the Chinese Nationalists
1948	Indonesian National Revolution	Operation Kraai	(Indonesia)	19 December 1948 – 5 January 1949	The second Dutch military Police Actions against Indonesia. Although the Dutch were militarily victorious, they were forced to give up the East Indies under international anti-colonial pressure.
1949	Indonesian National Revolution	Battle of Yogyakarta	(Indonesia)	1 March	Dutch Military Victory, Eventually withdraw under heavy International preasure
1949	Chinese Civil War	Battle of Kuningtou	(Republic of China (1912–1949))	25–27 October	Nationalist victory establishes Taiwan as the Nationalist refuge; Communists left in control of mainland China
1949	Chinese Civil War	Battle of Dengbu Island	(Republic of China (1912–1949))	3–5 November	
1950	Chinese Civil War	Battle of Bamianshan	(Republic of China (1912–1949))	19–31 January	
1950	Chinese Civil War	Battle of Tianquan	(Republic of China (1912–1949))	14–20 February	
1950	Chinese Civil War	Battle of Nan'ao Island	(Republic of China (1912–1949))	3 March	
1950	Chinese Civil War	Battle of Dongshan Island	(Republic of China (1912–1949))	11 May	
1950	Korean War	Battle of Gorangpo	(South Korea)	25–26 June	
1950	Korean War	Battle of Kaesong-Munsan	(South Korea)	25–26 June	
1950	Korean War	Battle of Ongjin	(South Korea)	25–26 June	
1950	Korean War	Battle of Uijeongbu	(South Korea)	25–26 June	
1950	Korean War	First Battle of Seoul	(South Korea)	25–28 June	
1950	Korean War	Battle of Chuncheon	(South Korea)	25–29 June	
1950	Korean War	Air Battle of South Korea	(South Korea) / (North Korea)	25 June – 20 July	
1950	Korean War	Operation Pokpoong	(South Korea) / (North Korea)	25 June – 31 July	North Korean offensive ends in victory
1950	Korean War	Battle of Suwon Airfield	(South Korea)	27 June	
1950	Korean War	Battle of Chumonchin Chan	At sea	2 July	
1950	Korean War	Battle of Osan	(South Korea)	5 July	
1950	Korean War	Battle of Pyongtaek	(South Korea)	6 July	
1950	Korean War	Battle of Chonan	(South Korea)	7–8 July	
1950	Korean War	Battle of Chochiwon	(South Korea)	10–12 July	
1950	Korean War	Battle of Taejon	(South Korea)	14–21 July	
1950	Korean War	Battle of Sangju	(South Korea)	20–31 July	
1950	Korean War	Battle of Yongdong	(South Korea)	22–25 July	
1950	Korean War	Battle of Hwanggan	(South Korea)	23–29 July	
1950	Korean War	Hadong Ambush	(South Korea)	27 July	
1950	Korean War	Battle of Andong	(South Korea)	29 July – 1 August	
1950	Korean War	Battle of the Notch	(South Korea)	2 August	
1950	Korean War	Battle of Pusan Perimeter	(South Korea)	4 August – 18 September	UN forces stop North Korean invasion of South Korea, counterattack in mid-September in conjunction with Battle of Inchon
1950	Korean War	Battle of Inchon	(South Korea)	15–19 September	UN retakes South Korea, reaches Seoul in 12 days
1950	Annexation of Tibet/Cold War	Battle of Chamdo	(Tibet)	6–19 October	Chinese victory
1950	Korean War	Battle of Sariwon	(North Korea)	17 October	UN victory
1950	Korean War	Battle of Kujin	(North Korea)	25–26 October	UN victory
1950	Korean War	Battle of Onjong	(North Korea)	25–29 October	Chinese victory
1950	Korean War	Battle of Unsan	(North Korea)	25 October – 4 November	Chinese victory
1950	Korean War	Battle of Chongju	(North Korea)	29–30 October	Australian/UN victory
1950	Korean War	Battle of Pakchon	(North Korea)	5 November	Australian/UN victory
1950	Korean War	Battle of the Ch'ongch'on River	(North Korea)	25 November – 2 December	Decisive Chinese victory, UN forces expelled from North Korea
1950	Korean War	Battle of Chosin Reservoir	(North Korea)	27 November – 13 December	Chinese strategic victory
1950	Korean War	Third Battle of Seoul	(South Korea)	31 December 1950 – 7 January 1951	Chinese and North Korean forces take Seoul

== 1951–1955 ==
Year	War	Battle	Loc.	Date(s)	Description
1951	Korean War	Battle of Uijeongbu	(South Korea)	1–4 January	UN defeat
1951	First Indochina War	Battle of Vĩnh Yên	(French Indochina)	13–17 January	French victory
1951	Korean War	Battle of the Twin Tunnels	(South Korea)	1 February	UN victory
1951	Korean War	Battle of Hoengsong	(South Korea)	11–13 February	Chinese and North Korean victory
1951	Korean War	Third Battle of Wonju	(South Korea)	13–18 February	UN victory
1951	Korean War	Battle of Maehwa-san	(South Korea)	7–12 March	UN victory
1951	First Indochina War	Battle of Mạo Khê	(French Indochina)	23–28 March	French victory
1951	Arab–Israeli conflict	Al-Hamma incident	(Israel) / (Syria)	4 April	Syrian victory
1951	Korean War	Battle of Yultong	(South Korea)	22–23 April	Filipino/UN victory
1951	Korean War	Battle of the Imjin River	(South Korea)	22–25 April	Chinese victory
1951	Korean War	Battle of Kapyong	(South Korea)	22–25 April	Australian/UN victory
1951	Korean War	Battle of Bloody Ridge	(South Korea)	18 August – 5 September	UN victory
1951	Korean War	Battle of Heartbreak Ridge	(South Korea)	13 September – 15 October	UN victory
1951	Korean War	Naval Battle of the Han River	(South Korea)	28–30 September	Australian Navy ship bombs Chinese forces
1951	Korean War	First Battle of Maryang San	(South Korea)	3–8 October 1951	UN victory
1951	First Indochina War	Battle of Nghĩa Lộ	(French Indochina)	3–10 October	French victory
1951	Korean War	Battle of Haktang-ni	(North Korea)	9–13 October	UN victory
1951	Korean War	Battle of Yongyu	(North Korea)	21–22 October	Americans and Australians defeat North Korean forces
1951	Korean War	Second Battle of Maryang San	(North Korea)	5 November 1951	Chinese victory
1951	Korean War	Battle of Chuam-ni	(South Korea)	14–17 November	UN victory over China
1951	Korean War	Battle of Sunchon	(North Korea)	1 December	Soviet Air Force defeats Australian Air Force
1952	Decolonisation of Africa	Battle of Ismailia (1952)	(Kingdom of Egypt)	25 January	British soldiers defeat Egyptian police.
1952	Korean War	Battle of Hill Eerie	(North Korea)	21 March – 18 July	UN victory
1952	Korean War	Battle of Old Baldy	(South Korea)	26 June 1952 – 26 March 1953	
1952	Korean War	Battle of Bunker Hill	(South Korea)	9 August – 30 September	UN victory
1952	Korean War	Battle of Outpost Kelly	(South Korea)	17–24 September	Chinese victory
1952	Cross-Strait conflict	Battle of Nanpeng Archipelago	(Taiwan)	20 September – 20 October	
1952	Korean War	Battle of White Horse	(South Korea)	6–15 October	UN victory
1952	Chinese Civil War	Battle of Nanri Island	(China)	11–15 October	
1952	Korean War	Battle of Triangle Hill	(North Korea)	14 October – 25 November	Chinese victory
1952	Korean War	Second Battle of the Hook	(South Korea)	18–19 November	UN victory
1952	First Indochina War	Battle of Nà Sản	(French Indochina)	23 November – 2 December	French victory
1952	Korean War	Battle of the Noris	(South Korea)	11–14 December	UN victory
1953	Korean War	Battle of Pork Chop Hill	(North Korea)	23 March – 11 July	UN victory in April, Chinese victory in July
1953	Korean War	Battle of the Nevada Complex	(South Korea)	25–29 May	Chinese victory
1953	Korean War	Third Battle of the Hook	(North Korea)	28–29 May	UN victory
1953	Korean War	Battle of Dalushan Islands	(Taiwan)	29 May	
1953	Korean War	Battle of Kumsong	(North Korea)	10 June – 20 July	Chinese victory
1953	Korean War	Battle of the Berlin Outposts and Boulder City	(South Korea)	7–27 July	UN victory
1953	Korean War	Battle of the Samichon River	(North Korea)	24–26 July	UN victory
1953	Cuban revolution	Attack on the Moncada Barracks	(Cuba)	26 July	Cuban government victory, rebels retreated , many rebels captured including Fidel Castro .
1954	First Indochina War	Battle of Dien Bien Phu	(French Indochina)	13 March – 7 May	France loses Indochina
1954	Arab–Israeli conflict	Lavon Affair	(Egypt)	2–14 July	Israel detonates bombs at libraries of the U.S. Information Agency and a British-owned theater, Israeli operational failure, Imprisonment and execution of most of the operatives .
1955	First Taiwan Strait Crisis	Battle of Yijiangshan Islands	(Taiwan)	18–20 January	
1955	Algerian War	Battle of Philippeville	(French Algeria)	20 August	
1955	Cyprus Emergency	Battle of Famagusta	(British Cyprus)	20–21 November	
1955	Cyprus Emergency	Battle of the Pine	(British Cyprus)	23 November	
1955	Cyprus Emergency	Battle of Spilia	(British Cyprus)	12 December	

== 1956–1960 ==
Year	War	Battle	Loc.	Date(s)	Description
1956	Gaza–Israel conflict	Nahal Oz ambush	(Israel)	29 April	Egyptian policeman and a Palestinian militant ambush and kill a guard of Nahal Oz.
1956	Algerian War	Palestro ambush	(Algeria)	18 May	Algerian victory.
1956	Cold war	Hungarian Revolution of 1956	(Hungary)	23 October-11 November	Soviet victory ,Budapest falls under Soviet control , 200,000 flee Hungary as refugees.
1956	Suez Crisis	Battle of Mitla Pass	(Egypt)	31 October	Britain, France and Israel attempt to retake the Suez Canal after recent Egyptian nationalization
1956	Suez Crisis	1956 Gaza battle	(Egypt)	31 October -3 November	Britain, France and Israel attempt to retake the Suez Canal after recent Egyptian nationalization
1956	Suez Crisis	Battle of Sharm el sheikh	(Egypt)	2–5 November	Britain, France and Israel attempt to retake the Suez Canal after recent Egyptian nationalization
1956	Suez Crisis	Operation Telescope	(Egypt)	5–6 November	Britain, France and Israel attempt to retake the Suez Canal after recent Egyptian nationalization
1956	Suez Crisis	Battle of Port Said	(Egypt)	5 November – 22 December	Britain, France and Israel attempt to retake the Suez Canal after recent Egyptian nationalization
1956	Cuban Revolution	Battle of Alegría de Pío	(Cuba)	11–21 July	Cuban National Army victory, Fidel Castro managed to retreat with a small number of rebels .
1957	Algerian War	Battle of Agounennda	(Algeria)	23–25 May	French victory,Commander Azzedine escape French forces but with heavy casualties
1957	Algerian War	Battle of Bouzegza	(Algeria)	4–12 August	Algerian victory on 4 August,French victory on 12 August,Ali Khodja managed to retreat with the minimum damage possible.
1958	Algerian War	Battle of Bab El Bekkouche	(Algeria)	28–31 May	Algerian victory
1958	Cuban Revolution	Battle of La Plata	(Cuba)	11–21 July	rebel victory
1958	Cuban Revolution	Battle of Las Mercedes	(Cuba)	29 July – 8 August	Cuban government victory
1958	Cuban Revolution	Battle of Yaguajay	(Cuba)	19–30 December	rebel victory
1958	Cuban Revolution	Battle of Santa Clara	(Cuba)	29 December- 1 January 1959	rebel victory , dissolution of Batista government.

== 1961–1965 ==
Year	War	Battle	Loc.	Date(s)	Description
1961	Consolidation of the Cuban Revolution	Bay of Pigs Invasion	(Cuba)	17–20 April	A failed U.S.-backed attempt to capture Cuba and a major blow to U.S. pride and reputation
1962	Vietnam War	Operation Chopper	(South Vietnam)	12 January	First major combat of American forces in the Vietnam War
1962	Western New Guinea dispute	Battle of Arafura Sea	At sea	15 January	Operation Trikora; this was the last time the Royal Netherlands Navy sunk a ship
1962	Vietnam War	Operation Sunrise	(South Vietnam)	22 March – 30 April	South Vietnamese counteroffensive to disrupt Vietcong near Saigon
1962	Sino-Indian War	Battle of Namka Chu	(China) / (India)	10 October – 16 November	Chinese victory
1962	Indonesia–Malaysia confrontation	Raid on Limbang	(Brunei)	12 December	British commandos defeat Malaysian insurgents
1963	Vietnam War	Battle of Ap Bac	(South Vietnam)	2 January	North Vietnamese victory
1963	Vietnam War	Battle of Go Cong	(South Vietnam)	3 September	South Vietnamese victory
1963	Indonesia–Malaysia confrontation	Battle of Long Jawai	(Brunei)	28 September	Initial Indonesian victory, but Britain successfully counterattacks
1963	Vietnam War	Battle of Hiệp Hòa	(South Vietnam)	22 November	Vietcong victory
1964	Vietnam War	Battle of Long Dinh	(South Vietnam)	26 February	Indecisive
1964	Vietnam War	Battle of Kien Long	(South Vietnam)	12–20 April	South Vietnamese victory; Vietcong successfully retreats
1964		Battle of St. Hilarion Castle	(Cyprus)	25-27 April	Turkish Cypriots win, retaining the Nicosia-Kyrenia pass high ground.
1964	Vietnam War	Operation Quyet Thang 202	(South Vietnam)	27 April – 27 May	South Vietnamese victory
1964	Vietnam War	Battle of Nam Dong	(South Vietnam)	5–6 July	Allied victory over North Vietnam
1964	Indonesia–Malaysia confrontation	Landing at Labis	(Indonesia)	September – October	Allied (the UK, New Zealand and Malaysia) forces successfully land on Indonesian troops
1964	Indonesia–Malaysia confrontation	Landing at Kesang River	(Indonesia)	29 October	Australian and British forces defeat Indonesian landing
1964	Vietnam War	Battle of An Lão	(South Vietnam)	7–9 December	North Vietnamese victory
1964	Indonesia–Malaysia confrontation	Action of 13 December 1964	At sea	13 December	Australian minesweeper defeats Indonesian patrol boat
Vietnam War	Battle of Binh Gia	(South Vietnam)	28 December 1964 – 1 January 1965	Vietcong victory	
Vietnam War	1965	(South Vietnam)	Attack on Camp Holloway	6–7 February	Vietcong victory, beginning of Operation Flaming Dart
Vietnam War	1965	(South Vietnam)	Battle of Dương Liễu–Nhông Pass	7–8 February	Vietcong victory
Vietnam War	1965	Operation Flaming Dart	(North Vietnam)	7–24 February	Escalation of the Vietnam War
Vietnam War	1965	First Battle of Thanh Hóa Bridge	(North Vietnam)	4 April 1965 – 13 May 1972	North Vietnamese jets take down three American jets attempting to blow up a key bridge; the bridge still stands
Vietnam War	1965	Operation Starlite	(South Vietnam)	18–24 April	First major American-only offensive, both sides claim victory
Indonesia-Malaysia Confrontation	1965	Battle of Plaman Mapu	(Brunei)	27 April	British victory
Vietnam War	1965	Battle of Sông Bé	(South Vietnam)	10–15 May	American-South Vietnamese victory
Indonesia–Malaysia confrontation	1965	Battle of Sungei Koemba	(Indonesia)	27 May – 12 June	Australian forces defeat Indonesian forces
Vietnam War	1965	Battle of Ba Gia	(South Vietnam)	28–31 May	Vietcong victory
Indonesia–Malaysia confrontation	1965	Battle of Kindau	(Indonesia)	15 June	Australian forces defeat Indonesian forces
Indonesia–Malaysia confrontation	1965	Battle of Babang	(Indonesia)	12 July	Australian forces defeat Indonesian forces
Indo-Pakistani War of 1965	1965	Battle of Lahore	(Pakistan)	6–12 September	Indian victory
Vietnam War	1965	Operation Piranha	(South Vietnam)	7–10 September	American forces storm the Batangan Peninsula
Indo-Pakistani War of 1965	1965	Battle of Phillora	(Pakistan)	7–11 September	Indian victory
Indo-Pakistani War of 1965	1965	Battle of Asal Uttar	(India)	8–10 September	Indian victory
Indo-Pakistani War of 1965	1965	Battle of Chawinda	(Pakistan)	14–19 September	Inconclusive
Vietnam War	1965	Battle of An Ninh	(South Vietnam)	18–19 September	Americans considered the battle a victory due to low losses and capture, but in the wider campaign, it was a defeat
Vietnam War	1965	Siege of Plei Me	(South Vietnam)	19–25 October	First major battle between the U.S. and North Vietnam
Vietnam War	1965	Pleiku campaign	(South Vietnam)	27 October – 26 November	Large American victory
Vietnam War	1965	Operation Hump	(South Vietnam)	5–8 November	American/Australian success
Vietnam War	1965	Battle of Gang Toi	(South Vietnam)	8 November	First major encounter between Australia and North Vietnam, a minor Vietcong victory
Vietnam War	1965	Battle of Ap Bau Bang	(South Vietnam)	12 November	Both sides declare victory
Vietnam War	1965	Battle of Ia Drang	(South Vietnam)	14–18 November	First major encounter between the United States Army and the People's Army of Vietnam in Vietnam. Over the first two days an American battalion repulses continuous Vietnamese assaults; another battalion, sent to reinforce the first, is ambushed on the fourth day when it withdraws, suffering heavy losses.
Indonesia–Malaysia Confrontation	1965	Battle of Bau	(Malaysia)	21 November	British victory
Vietnam War	1965	Operation Bushmaster II	(South Vietnam)	1–6 December	American victory
Vietnam War	1965	Operation Harvest Moon	(South Vietnam)	8–20 December	Allied victory

== 1966–1970 ==
Year	War	Battle	Loc.	Date(s)	Description
1966	Vietnam War	Operation Marauder	(South Vietnam)	1–8 January	Allied victory
1966	Vietnam War	Battle of the Ho Bo Woods	(South Vietnam)	8–14 January	American/Australian victory
1966	Vietnam War	Operation Double Eagle	(South Vietnam)	18 January – 17 February	Inconclusive
1966	Laotian Civil War, Vietnam War	Battle of Nakhang	(Laos)	16–28 February	
1966	Vietnam War	Battle of Suoi Bong Trang	(South Vietnam)	23–24 February	Major Australian victory
1966	Vietnam War	Battle of Đức Cơ	(South Vietnam)	23–24 February	
1966	Vietnam War	Operation Utah	(South Vietnam)	4–7 March	American/South Vietnamese victory
1966	Vietnam War	Battle of A Sau	(South Vietnam)	9–10 March	
1966	Vietnam War	Operation Jackstay	(South Vietnam)	26 March – 6 April	American victory
1966	Vietnam War	Battle of Xa Cam My	(South Vietnam)	11–12 April	
1966	Vietnam War	Operation Georgia	(South Vietnam)	21 April – 10 May	American victory
1966	Rhodesian Bush War	Battle of Sinoia	(Rhodesia)	28 April	
1966	Vietnam War	Operation Davy Crockett	(South Vietnam)	1–16 May	American victory
1966	Vietnam War	Operation Paul Revere	(South Vietnam)	10 May – 1 August	American/South Korean victory
1966	Vietnam War	Operation Wahiawa	(South Vietnam)	16–30 May	American victory
1966	Vietnam War	Operation Crazy Horse	(South Vietnam)	16 May – 5 June	American victory
1966	Vietnam War	Operation Hardihood	(South Vietnam)	16 May – 8 June	American/Australian victory
1966	Vietnam War	Operation El Paso	(South Vietnam)	19 May – 13 July	American/South Vietnamese victory
1966	Vietnam War	Operation Hawthorne	(South Vietnam)	2–21 June	American/South Vietnamese victory
1966	Vietnam War	Battle of Hill 488	(South Vietnam)	15–16 June	American victory
1966	Vietnam War	Operation Nathan Hale	(South Vietnam)	19–30 June	American victory
1966	Vietnam War	Operation Jay	(South Vietnam)	25 June – 2 July	American victory
1966	Vietnam War	Operation Macon	(South Vietnam)	4 July – 28 October	American victory
1966	Vietnam War	Battle of Minh Thanh Road	(South Vietnam)	9 July	American victory
1966	Vietnam War	Operation Hastings	(North Vietnam) / (South Vietnam)	15 July – 3 August	American troops force North Vietnamese across the Vietnamese DMZ
1966	Vietnam War	Operation John Paul Jones	(South Vietnam)	21 July – 5 September	Inconclusive
1966	Laotian Civil War	Battle of Nam Bac	(Laos)	August 1966 – January 1968	
1966	Vietnam War	Operation Prairie	(South Vietnam) / (North Vietnam)	3 August 1966 – 31 January 1967	Attempt to drive away North Vietnamese units under the Vietnamese DMZ
1966	Vietnam War	Battle of Đức Cơ	(South Vietnam)	9–10 August	
1966	Vietnam War	Battle of Long Tan	(South Vietnam)	18–19 August	First major action of Australian forces in Vietnam
1966	Vietnam War	Operation Amarillo	(South Vietnam)	23–31 August	Inconclusive
1966	Vietnam War	Operation Seward	(South Vietnam)	5–25 September	American victory
1966	Vietnam War	Operation Thayer	(South Vietnam)	13 September 1966 – 12 February 1967	Allied victory
1966	Vietnam War	Operation Attleboro	(South Vietnam)	14 September – 25 November	Both sides declare victory
1966	Vietnam War	Operation Shenandoah	(South Vietnam)	16 October – 2 November	American victory
1966	Vietnam War	Operation Atlanta	(South Vietnam)	19 October – December	American victory
1966	Vietnam War	Operation Paul Revere IV	(South Vietnam)	20 October – 30 December	Inconclusive
1966	Vietnam War	Operation Fairfax	(South Vietnam)	November 1966 – 15 December 1967	American combing operation victory
1967	Vietnam War	Operation Deckhouse Five	(South Vietnam)	6–15 January	Inconclusive
1967	Vietnam War	Operation Cedar Falls	(South Vietnam)	8–26 January	Inconclusive
1967	Vietnam War	Operation Desoto	(South Vietnam)	27 January – 7 April	American victory
1967	Vietnam War	Operation Prairie II	(North Vietnam) / (South Vietnam)	1 February – 18 March	American victory
1967	Vietnam War	Operation Enterprise	(South Vietnam)	13 February 1967 – 11 March 1968	American victory
1967	Vietnam War	Battle of Trà Bình	(South Vietnam)	14–15 February	South Korean victory
1967	Vietnam War	Operation Bribie	(South Vietnam)	17–18 February	Inconclusive
1967	Vietnam War	Operation Junction City	(South Vietnam)	22 February – 14 May	Inconclusive
1967	Vietnam War	Battle of Prek Klok I	(South Vietnam)	28 February	American victory
1967	Vietnam War	Battle of Prek Klok II	(South Vietnam)	10 March	American victory over a Vietcong ambush
1967	Vietnam War	Second Battle of Bàu Bàng	(South Vietnam)	19–20 March	American victory
1967	Vietnam War	Operation Prairie III	(North Vietnam) / (South Vietnam)	19 March – 19 April	American victory
1967	Vietnam War	Battle of Suoi Tre	(South Vietnam)	21 March	Costly Vietcong defeat
1967	Vietnam War	Battle of Ap Gu	(South Vietnam)	31 March – 1 April	American forces defeat Vietcong
1967	Vietnam War	Operation Francis Marion	(South Vietnam)	6 April – 11 October	Inconclusive
1967	Vietnam War	Operation Lejeune	(South Vietnam)	7–22 April	American victory
1967	Vietnam War	Operation Prairie IV	(North Vietnam) / (South Vietnam)	20 April – 17 May	Costly American victory
1967	Vietnam War	Operation Union	(South Vietnam)	21 April – 16 May	American attempt to find Vietcong in the Quế Sơn Valley
1967	Vietnam War	Operation Baker	(South Vietnam)	22 April – 31 July	American victory
1967	Vietnam War	Operation Manhattan	(South Vietnam)	23 April – 7 June	American recon victory
1967	Vietnam War	First Battle of Khe Sanh	(South Vietnam)	24 April – 11 May	Americans capture Hill 861
1967	Vietnam War	Operation Beaver Cage	(South Vietnam)	28 April – 12 May	American victory
1967	Vietnam War	Operations Malheur I and Malheur II	(North Vietnam)	11 May – 2 August	American victory
1967	Vietnam War	Operation Crockett	(South Vietnam)	13 May – 16 July	American victory
1967	Vietnam War	Operation Kole Kole	(South Vietnam)	14 May – 7 December	American victory
1967	Vietnam War	Operation Hickory	(South Vietnam)	18–28 May	Inconclusive
1967	Vietnam War	Operation Barking Sands	(South Vietnam)	18 May – 7 December	American victory
1967	Vietnam War	Operation Union II	(South Vietnam)	26 May – 5 June	American/South Vietnamese victory
1967	Vietnam War	Operation Dragnet	(South Vietnam)	26 May 1967 – 27 January 1968	Allied victory
1967	Six-Day War	Battle of Abu-Ageila	(Egypt)	5–6 June	Israel defeats Egypt.
1967	Six-Day War	Battle of Ammunition Hill	(Jordan)	6 June	Israel defeats Jordan.
1967	Vietnam War	Operation Akron	(South Vietnam)	9–29 June	American/South Vietnamese forces attempt to flank Vietcong troops, but both sides take losses
1967	Vietnam War	Operation Billings	(South Vietnam)	12–26 June	American victory
1967	Vietnam War	Operation Concordia	(South Vietnam)	19–21 June	Allied victory
1967	Vietnam War	Battle of the Slopes	(South Vietnam)	20–22 June	North Vietnamese victory
1967	Nigerian Civil War	Battle of Nsukka	(Republic of Biafra)	2–12 July	
1967	Vietnam War	Operation Diamond Head	(South Vietnam)	11 July – 31 October	American victory
1967	Vietnam War	Operation Kingfisher	(South Vietnam)	16 July – 31 October	Inconclusive, both sides claim victory
1967	Vietnam War	Operation Coronado II	(South Vietnam)	27–31 July	Allied victory
1967	Vietnam War	Operation Hood River	(South Vietnam)	2–13 August	Inconclusive
1967	Vietnam War	Battle of Suoi Chau Pha	(South Vietnam)	6 August	Australian victory
1967	Vietnam War	Operation Colorado	(South Vietnam)	6–22 August	American/South Vietnamese victory
1967	Nigerian Civil War	Midwest Invasion of 1967	(Nigeria)	9 August – 20 September	
1967	Nigerian Civil War	Battle of Ore	(Nigeria)	11 August	
1967	Vietnam War	Operation Benton	(South Vietnam)	13–29 August	American victory
1967	Vietnam War	Operation Coronado IV	(South Vietnam)	19 August – 9 September	American victory
1967	Vietnam War	Action of 23 August 1967	(North Vietnam)	23 August	North Vietnamese fighter jets defeat American jets
1967	Vietnam War	Operation Byrd	(South Vietnam)	25 August – 1 December	American/South Vietnamese victory
1967	Vietnam War	Operation Swift	(South Vietnam)	4–15 September	American/South Vietnamese victory
1967	Nathu La and Cho La clashes		(China) / (Kingdom of Sikkim)	11–14 September	Indian forces beat back Chinese forces
1967	Vietnam War	Operation Wheeler/Wallowa	(South Vietnam)	11 September 1967 – 11 November 1968	American offensive, where the Tiger Force committed war crimes
1967	Nigerian Civil War	Fall of Enugu	(Nigeria)	12 September – 4 October	Nigerian forces capture the Biafran capital of Enugu
1967	Vietnam War	Operation Coronado V	(South Vietnam)	12 September – 7 October	American victory
1967	Vietnam War	Operation Kunia	(South Vietnam)	15 September – 9 November	Inconclusive
1967	Vietnam War	Operation Shenandoah II	(South Vietnam)	29 September – 10 December	Americans try to repair highway
1967	Nigerian Civil War	First Battle of Onitsha	(Republic of Biafra)	4–12 October	
1967	Vietnam War	Operation Medina	(South Vietnam)	11–20 October	Inconclusive
1967	Vietnam War	Operation MacArthur	(South Vietnam)	12 October 1967 – 31 January 1969	American victory
1967	Vietnam War	Battle of Ong Thanh	(South Vietnam)	17 October	Vietcong victory
1967	Nigerian Civil War	Operation Tiger Claw	(Republic of Biafra)	17–19 October	
1967	Vietnam War	Operation Osceola	(South Vietnam)	20 October 1967 – 16 February 1968	Inconclusive
1967	Vietnam War	First Battle of Loc Ninh	(South Vietnam)	29 October – 7 November	American and South Vietnamese troops capture Loc Ninh
1967	Vietnam War	Operation Lancaster	(South Vietnam)	1 November 1967 – 20 January 1968	Minor operation, Tet Offensive causes beginning of Operation Lancaster II
1967	Vietnam War	Operation Coronado IX	(South Vietnam)	1 November 1967 – 22 January 1968	American victory
1967	Vietnam War	Operation Neosho	(South Vietnam)	1 November 1967 – 25 January 1968	Continuation of Operation Fremont
1967	Vietnam War	Operation Kentucky	(South Vietnam)	1 November 1967 – 28 February 1969	Low-level American cross-Vietnamese DMZ operation
1967	Vietnam War	Battle of Dak To	(South Vietnam)	3–23 November	Pyrrhic American victory
1967	Vietnam War	Operation Santa Fe	(South Vietnam)	3 November 1967 – 5 January 1968	Allied victory
1967	Vietnam War	Operation Essex	(South Vietnam)	6–17 November	Minor American victory
1967	Vietnam War	Operation Napoleon/Saline	(South Vietnam)	November – 9 December	Allied victory
1967	Vietnam War	Operation Kien Giang 9-1	(South Vietnam)	15–19 November	American/South Vietnamese victory
1967	Vietnam War	Operation Manchester	(South Vietnam)	4 December 1967 – 17 February 1968	American victory
1967	Vietnam War	Battle of Tam Quan	(South Vietnam)	6–20 December	American victory
1967	Vietnam War	Operation Yellowstone	(South Vietnam)	8 December 1967 – 24 February 1968	American victory
1967	Vietnam War	Operation Saratoga	(South Vietnam)	8 December 1967 – 11 March 1968	American victory
1967	Vietnam War	Operation Muscatine	(South Vietnam)	18 December 1967 – 10 June 1968	American victory
1967	Vietnam War	Operation Badger Tooth	(South Vietnam)	26 December 1967 – 2 January 1968	Inconclusive
1967	Vietnam War	Operation Auburn	(South Vietnam)	28 December 1967 – 3 January 1968	American victory
1968	Vietnam War	Operation Niagara	(South Vietnam)	January – March	American counterattack on Tet Offensive
1968	Vietnam War	New Year's Day battle of 1968	(South Vietnam)	1–2 January	American victory
1968	Nigerian Civil War	Second Battle of Onitsha	(Republic of Biafra)	2 January – 20 March	Nigerian forces capture Onitsha
1968	Vietnam War	Operation Lancaster II	(South Vietnam)	20 January – 23 November	American victory
1968	Vietnam War	Operation McLain	(South Vietnam)	20 January 1968 – 31 January 1969	American victory
1968	Vietnam War	Operation Jeb Stuart	(South Vietnam)	21 January – 31 March	Spontaneous American counterattack disrupted by Tet Offensive
1968	Vietnam War	Battle of Khe Sanh	(South Vietnam)	21 January – 8 April	Desperate defense by the U.S. Marines to hold strategically important fire base against huge NVA numbers. Vietnamese Communists fail in their bid to turn the siege into an "American Battle of Dien Bien Phu", though it is also possible that Khe Sanh was used as a diversion.
1968	Korean DMZ Conflict	Capture of the USS Pueblo	At sea	23 January	North Korea seizes U.S. ship USS Pueblo (AGER-2)
1968	Vietnam War	Battle of Ban Houei Sane	(Laos)	23–24 January	North Vietnamese troops defeat a small garrison of Laotian Royal troops
1968	Vietnam War	Operation Coronado X	(South Vietnam)	23 January – 12 February	Allied victory
1968	Vietnam War	Operation Coburg	(South Vietnam)	24 January – 1 March	Allied victory over North Vietnam
1968	Vietnam War	Tet offensive attacks on Da Nang	(South Vietnam)	29 January – 11 February	Allied forces repulse Vietcong attacks
1968	Vietnam War	Tet Offensive	(South Vietnam)	30 January	North Vietnam loses militarily but turns the tide of U.S. opinion against the war
1968	Vietnam War	Battle of Saigon	(South Vietnam)	30 January – 7 March	American and South Vietnamese troops repel the attack, but it heavily increases anti-war sentiment in the US.
1968	Vietnam War	Battle of Bến Tre	(South Vietnam)	31 January – 5 February	Vietcong attack Bến Tre, but fail to capture it
1968	Vietnam War	Battle of Quang Tri	(South Vietnam)	31 January – 6 February	South Vietnamese/American victory
1968	Vietnam War	Battle of Da Lat	(South Vietnam)	January – 9 February	North Vietnamese attacks and captures Da Lat, but loses it in an American/South Vietnamese attack days later
1968	Vietnam War	Battle of Cholon and Phu Tho Racetrack	(South Vietnam)	31 January – 11 February	American/South Vietnamese victory
1968	Vietnam War	Battle of Huế	(South Vietnam)	31 January – 2 March	American and South Vietnamese forces successfully defend the city, although Vietcong commit the Hue Massacre
1968	Vietnam War	Battle of Lang Vei	(South Vietnam)	6–7 February	North Vietnamese captures Lang Vei camp
1968	Vietnam War	Operation Truong Cong Dinh	(South Vietnam)	7 March – 7 August	South Vietnam attempts to regain control over major highways
1968	Vietnam War	Battle of Lo Giang	(South Vietnam)	8–9 February	American troops repel North Vietnamese attacks
1968	Vietnam War	Operation Hop Tac I	(South Vietnam)	10 February – 10 March	American victory
1968	Vietnam War	Operation Coronado XI	(South Vietnam)	12 February – 3 March	Allied victory
1968	Vietnam War	Operation Houston	(South Vietnam)	26 February – 12 September	American victory
1968	Vietnam War	Action of 1 March 1968	(South Vietnam)	1 March	North Vietnamese ships attempt to ambush South Vietnamese ships
1968	Vietnam War	Operation Patrick	(South Vietnam)	1–30 March	American victory
1968	Vietnam War	Battle of Tam Kỳ	(South Vietnam)	3–6 March	American victory
1968	Nigerian Civil War	Invasion of Port Harcourt	(Republic of Biafra)	8 March – 24 May	Nigerian forces capture Port Harcourt
1968	Vietnam War, Laotian Civil War	Battle of Lima Site 85	(Laos)	10–11 March	North Vietnamese-Pathet Lao victory
1968	Vietnam War	Operation Quyet Thang	(South Vietnam)	11 March – 7 April	South Vietnamese and U.S. recapture areas around Saigon
1968	Vietnam War	Operation Walker	(South Vietnam)	17 March 1968 – 31 January 1969	American victory
1968	Vietnam War	Operation Carentan	(South Vietnam)	18 March – 17 May	American victory
1968	Vietnam War	Operation Frederick Hill	(South Vietnam)	18 March 1968 – 28 February 1971	American successfully conduct a security operation in Quảng Tín province
1968	Vietnam War	Operation Geneva Park	(South Vietnam)	18 March 1968 – 28 February 1971	American successfully conduct a security operation in Quang Ngai Province
1968	War of Attrition, Israeli–Palestinian conflict	Battle of Karameh	(Jordan)	21 March	Jordanian troops with the PLO repel an Israeli raid to capture Yasser Arafat, but the camp is destroyed
1968	Vietnam War	Operation Cochise Green	(South Vietnam)	30 March – 31 January 1969	American victory
1968	Nigerian Civil War	Abagana Ambush	(Nigeria)	31 March	Biafran ambush wipes out the Nigerian 2nd Division
1968	Vietnam War	Operation Toan Thang I	(South Vietnam)	8 April – 31 May	Allied victory
1968	Vietnam War	Operation Burlington Trail	(South Vietnam)	8 April – 11 November	American victory
1968	Vietnam War	Battle of Signal Hill	(South Vietnam)	19–21 April	Pyrrhic North Vietnamese victory
1968	Vietnam War	Operation Delaware	(South Vietnam)	19 April – 17 May	Inconclusive
1968	Vietnam War	May Offensive	(South Vietnam)	29 April – 30 May	North Vietnamese offensive smaller in scale than the Tet Offensive, but much bloodier
1968	Vietnam War	Battle of Dai Do	(South Vietnam)	30 April – 3 May	Both sides claim victory
1968	Vietnam War	Operation Allen Brook	(South Vietnam)	4 May – 24 August	American/South Vietnamese forces drive back Vietcong
1968	Vietnam War	Battle of An Bao	(South Vietnam)	5–6 May	North Vietnamese forces ambush Americans, but the Americans fight back and win
1968	Vietnam War	Battle of West Saigon	(South Vietnam)	5–12 May	Allied victory
1968	Vietnam War	Battle of Landing Zone Center	(South Vietnam)	5–25 May	American victory
1968	Vietnam War	Battle of South Saigon	(South Vietnam)	7–12 May	Allied victory
1968	Vietnam War	Operation Concordia Square	(South Vietnam)	8–17 May	American victory
1968	Vietnam War	Battle of Kham Duc	(South Vietnam)	10–12 May	North Vietnamese victory and one of the largest battles of the war
1968	Vietnam War	Battle of Coral–Balmoral	(South Vietnam)	12 May – 6 June	Australian forces repel multiple North Vietnamese and Vietcong attacks over 26 days of fighting
1968	Vietnam War	Operation Jeb Stuart III	(South Vietnam)	17 May – 3 November	U.S. forces attack North Vietnamese bases
1968	Vietnam War	Operation Nevada Eagle	(South Vietnam)	17 May 1968 – 28 February 1969	Protection of Huế by Americans
1968	Vietnam War	Operation Toan Thang II	(South Vietnam)	1 June 1968 – 16 February 1969	Allied victory
1968	Vietnam War	Operation Robin	(South Vietnam)	2–19 June	American victory
1968	Vietnam War	Battle of Binh An	(South Vietnam)	27–28 June	American victory
1968	Vietnam War	Operation Thor	(North Vietnam)	1–8 July	American victory
1968	Vietnam War	Operation Pocahontas Forest	(South Vietnam)	6–31 July	Allied victory
1968	Vietnam War	Operation Quyet Chien	(South Vietnam)	3 August – 30 November	American/South Vietnamese victory
1968	Vietnam War	Operation Somerset Plain	(South Vietnam)	4–20 August	U.S. claims victory
1968	Vietnam War	Phase III offensive	(South Vietnam)	17 August—27 September	Failed third push by the North Vietnamese after the Tet Offensive
1968	Vietnam War	Battle of Duc Lap	(South Vietnam)	24–27 August	American/South Vietnamese victory
1968	Nigerian Civil War	Operation OAU	(Nigeria)	2 September—15 October	Nigerian forces capture Owerri and Aba, but are unable to capture Umuahia; the failure allows Biafra to retake Owerri and Aba
1968	Vietnam War	Operation Champaign Grove	(South Vietnam)	8–24 September	American victory
1968	Vietnam War	Operation Vinh Loc	(South Vietnam)	10–20 September	American/South Vietnamese victory
1968	Vietnam War	Operation Maui Peak	(South Vietnam)	1–19 October	American victory
1968	Nigerian Civil War	Siege of Owerri	(Nigeria)	15 October 1968—25 April 1969	Biafra recaptures Owerri
1968	Vietnam War	Operation Fulton Square	(South Vietnam)	22 October 1968—18 January 1970	Minor clashes between American/South Vietnamese forces and Vietcong
1968	Vietnam War	Operation Henderson Hill	(South Vietnam)	23 October—6 December	American victory
1968	Vietnam War	Operation Sheridan Sabre	(South Vietnam)	7 November 1968—4 April 1969	American victory
1968	Vietnam War	Operation Commando Hunt	(Laos)	15 November 1968—29 March 1972	Americans fail to bomb Vietcong supply routes
1968	Vietnam War	Operation Meade River	(South Vietnam)	20 November—9 December	American victory
1968	Vietnam War	Battle of Hat Dich	(South Vietnam)	3 December 1968—19 February 1969	Allied victory
1968	Vietnam War	Operation Taylor Common	(South Vietnam)	7 December 1968—8 March 1969	American/South Vietnamese victory
1968	Vietnam War	Operation Fayette Canyon	(South Vietnam)	15 December 1968—28 February 1969	American victory
1969	Vietnam War	Operation Dewey Canyon	(South Vietnam)	22 January—18 March	Last major offensive by the 3rd Marine Division
1969	Vietnam War	Operation Toan Thang III	(South Vietnam)	17 February—31 October	Allied victory
1969	Vietnam War	Operation Massachusetts Striker	(South Vietnam)	28 February—8 May	Both sides claim victory
1969	Vietnam War	Operation Iron Mountain	(South Vietnam)	28 February 1969—28 February 1971	American victory
1969	Vietnam War	Operation Purple Martin	(South Vietnam)	1 March—2 May	American victory
1969	Vietnam War	Operation Kentucky Jumper	(South Vietnam)	1 March—14 August	American reconnaissance operation
1969	Vietnam War	Operation Maine Crag	(South Vietnam)	15 March—2 May	American/South Vietnamese victory
1969	Vietnam War	Operation Atlas Wedge	(South Vietnam)	17–24 March	American victory
1969	Vietnam War	Operation Montana Mauler	(South Vietnam)	23 March—3 April	American victory
1969	Nigerian Civil War	Defense of Umuahia	(Republic of Biafra)	27 March—22 April	
1969	Vietnam War	Operation Washington Green	(South Vietnam)	15 April 1969—1 January 1971	American victory
1969	Vietnam War	Operation Virginia Ridge	(South Vietnam)	2 May—16 July	American victory
1969	Vietnam War	Operation Apache Snow	(South Vietnam)	10 May—7 June	American/South Vietnamese victory
1969	Vietnam War	Battle of Hamburger Hill	(South Vietnam)	13–20 May	American and South Vietnamese troops win, but heavy losses force them to withdraw
1969	Vietnam War	Operation Lamar Plain	(South Vietnam)	15 May—14 August	American victory
1969	Vietnam War	Operation Pipestone Canyon	(South Vietnam)	26 May—7 November	American launch a successful local offensive
1969	Vietnam War	Battle of Binh Ba	(South Vietnam)	6–8 June	Australians defeat Vietcong
1969	Vietnam War	Operation Montgomery Rendezvous	(South Vietnam)	8 June—15 August	Costly American victory
1969	Vietnam War	Operation Utah Mesa	(South Vietnam)	12 June—6 July	Allied victory
1969	Vietnam War	Operation Campbell Streamer	(South Vietnam)	13 July—15 August	Dozens of Vietcong killed
1969		Football War	14 July	Between El Salvador and Honduras	
1969	Vietnam War	Operation Idaho Canyon	(South Vietnam)	21 July—25 September	American victory
1969	Vietnam War	Operation Nantucket Beach	(South Vietnam)	23 July 1969—10 March 1971	American victory
1969	The Troubles	Battle of the Bogside	(Northern Ireland)	12–14 August	Unarmed Irish residents of the Bogside in Derry City expel Police and the Special Constabulary from their area. The riots lasts for 2 days until the British Army is sent in. This event is often described as the beginning of the Troubles, a 30-year guerrilla war.
1969	Vietnam War	Operation Camden	(South Vietnam)	21 August	Australian victory
1969	Vietnam War	Siege of Landing Zone Kate	(South Vietnam)	27 October—1 November	North Vietnamese victory
1969	Vietnam War	Operation Toan Thang IV	(South Vietnam)	1 November 1969—1 May 1970	Allied victory
1969	Vietnam War	Operation Randolph Glen	(South Vietnam)	7 December 1969—31 March 1970	Inconclusive
1969	Nigerian Civil War	Defense of Oguta	(Republic of Biafra)	20–24 December	
1970	Nigerian Civil War	Operation Tail-Wind	(Republic of Biafra)	7–12 January	Biafra surrenders to Nigeria
1970	Vietnam War	Operation Green River	(South Vietnam)	19 January—22 July	American victory
1970	Vietnam War	Operation Texas Star	(South Vietnam)	1 April—5 September	Indecisive
1970	The Troubles	Battle of St Matthew's	(Northern Ireland)	27–28 June	A battle between Provisional IRA and loyalists
1970	Vietnam War	Operation Pennsylvania Square	(South Vietnam)	29 June 1970—1 March 1971	American victory
1970	Vietnam War	Battle of Fire Support Base Ripcord	(South Vietnam)	1–23 July	North Vietnamese victory
1970	Vietnam War	Operation Clinch Valley	(South Vietnam)	9–15 July	American/South Vietnamese victory
1970	Vietnam War	Operation Elk Canyon	(South Vietnam)	12 July—29 September	Americans attempt to improve positions after the fall of Kham Duc, but fail
1970	Vietnam War	Operation Pickens Forest	(South Vietnam)	16 July—24 August	American victory
1970	Vietnam War	Operation Wolfe Mountain	(South Vietnam)	22 July 1970—30 January 1971	Inconclusive
1970	Vietnam War	Operation Chicago Peak	(South Vietnam)	24 July—11 August	American/South Vietnamese victory
1970	Vietnam War	Siege of Firebase O'Reilly	(South Vietnam)	9 August—7 October	North Vietnamese victory as the base closes down
1970	Vietnam War	Operation Imperial Lake	(South Vietnam)	1 September 1970—7 May 1971	American/South Korean success, but perpetration of the Sơn Thắng massacre
1970	Vietnam War	Operation Jefferson Glenn	(South Vietnam)	5 September 1970—8 October 1971	Last major ground offensive involving the U.S.
1970	Vietnam War	Operation Tailwind	(Laos)	11–13 September	American/South Vietnamese victory
1970	Vietnam War	Operation Ivory Coast	(North Vietnam)	21 November	American attempt to rescue POWs, but there were none
1970	Guinea-Bissau War of Independence	Operation Green Sea	(Guinea)	22 November	An amphibious attack on Conakry by Portugal

== 1971–1975 ==
Year	War	Battle	Loc.	Date(s)	Description
1971	Vietnam War	Battle of Snuol	(Cambodia)	5 January—30 May	American and North Vietnamese troops clash in Cambodia
1971	Vietnam War	Operation Cuu Long 44-02	(Cambodia)	13–25 January	South Vietnamese victory
1971	Vietnam War	Operation Finney Hill	(South Vietnam)	10 March—1 July	American victory
1971	Vietnam War	Operation Middlesex Peak	(South Vietnam)	10 March—1 July	American victory
1971	Vietnam War	Battle of FSB Mary Ann	(South Vietnam)	28 March	Vietcong ambush victory
1971	Vietnam War	Operation Caroline Hill	(South Vietnam)	29 April—1 July	American victory
1971	Vietnam War	Battle of Long Khánh	(South Vietnam)	6–7 June	Pyrrhic Australian victory, as the North Vietnamese ability to retreat and defend its supply routes ultimately led it to win over Australia
1971	Mexican Dirty War	El Halconazo	(Mexico)	10 June	the state sponsored Halcones paramilitary group attacked protester, initially repelled, they returned with high-caliber rifles and killed 120 protesters .
1971	Vietnam War	Battle of Nui Le	(South Vietnam)	21 September	Last major Australian/New Zealand victory of Vietnam War
1971	Bangladesh Liberation War, Indo-Pakistani War of 1971	Battle of Garibpur	(Pakistan)	20–21 November	Decisive Indian victory
1971	Bangladesh Liberation War, Indo-Pakistani War of 1971	First Battle of Hilli	(Pakistan)	22–24 November	Bloodiest battle of the Indo-Pakistani War of 1971; Indian and Bengali victory
1971		Seizure of Abu Musa and the Greater and Lesser Tunbs	(Iran) / (United Arab Emirates)	30 November	Iran captures the islands of Abu Musa and the Greater and Lesser Tunbs.
1971	Indo-Pakistani War of 1971	Operation Trident	(Pakistan)	4–5 December	Indian Navy attacks Karachi port
1971	Indo-Pakistani War of 1971	Battle of Longewala	(India)	4–7 December	Decisive Indian victory
1971	Indo-Pakistani War of 1971	Battle of Basantar	(Pakistan)	6–16 December	Tactical Indian victory
1971	Indo-Pakistani War of 1971	Second Battle of Hilli	(Pakistan)	10–11 December	Failed Pakistani counterattack on Hilli, Indian/Bengali victory
1972	New Left Movement in Japan	Asama-Sansō incident	(Japan)	19-28 Feb	Hostage rescued,2 Japanese police officers killed, United Red Army militants arrested
1972	Vietnam War	First Battle of Quảng Trị	(South Vietnam)	30 March—1 May	North Vietnamese victory during Easter Offensive
1972	Vietnam War	Second Battle of Lộc Ninh	(South Vietnam)	4–7 April	North Vietnamese victory
1972	Vietnam War	Battle of An Lộc	(South Vietnam)	13 April—20 July	Major battle ending in a South Vietnamese victory
1972	Vietnam War	Battle of Đồng Hới	(North Vietnam)	19 April	
1972	Vietnam War	Battle of the Mỹ Chánh Line	(South Vietnam)	5 May—26 June	South Vietnamese/American victory
1972	The Troubles	Battle at Springmartin	(Northern Ireland)	13–14 May	A battle that involved the British Army, the Provisional Irish Republican Army and the Ulster Volunteer Force
1972	Vietnam War	Battle of Kontum	(South Vietnam)	13 May—9 June	South Vietnam and U.S. troops repulse Vietcong attack
1972	Vietnam War	Second Battle of Quảng Trị	(South Vietnam)	28 June—16 September	South Vietnamese forces retake most of Quảng Trị province
1972	Dhofar Rebellion	Battle of Mirbat	(Oman)	19 July	British SAS forces defeat Communist rebels during an attempted coup of Oman
1972	Japanese WWII holdout	Lubang Island shootout	(Philippines)	19 October	Japanese soldiers Onoda and Kozuka engaged in a shootout with Philippine Police while raiding and burning rice harvest, Kozuka was killed while Onoda managed to escape .
1973	Vietnam War	Battle of Cửa Việt	(South Vietnam)	25–31 January	North Vietnam captures Cửa Việt Base.
1973	Vietnam War	Battle of Hồng Ngự	(South Vietnam)	March-4 May	Allied victory
1973	Vietnam War	Battle of Tong Le Chon	(South Vietnam)	25 March 1973—12 April 1974	North Vietnam captures Tonle Cham Camp
1973	Vietnam War	Battle of Trung Nghia	(South Vietnam)	8 June—16 September	South Vietnamese victory
1973	Vietnam War	Battle of Ap Da Bien	(South Vietnam)	3 October	South Vietnamese victory
1973	Yom Kippur War	Battles of Fort Budapest	(Egypt)	6 October	Egyptian troops fail to capture an Israeli fort
1973	Yom Kippur War	Battle of Fort Lahtzanit	(Egypt)	6 October	Egyptians capture an Israeli fort
1973	Yom Kippur War	Ofira Air Battle	(Egypt)	6 October	Israeli victory in the air
1973	Yom Kippur War	First Battle of Mount Hermon	(Syria)	6–7 October	Syria recaptures Mount Hermon
1973	Yom Kippur War	Operation Badr	(Egypt)	6–8 October	Egyptian offensive marking the beginning of the Yom Kippur War
1973	Yom Kippur War	Valley of Tears	(Syria)	6–9 October	Very bloody battle in the Golan Heights
1973	Yom Kippur War	Operation Model 5	(Syria)	7 October	Syrian troops win an anti-aircraft battle
1973	Yom Kippur War	Operation Tagar	(Egypt)	7 October	Israel forfeits the operation attempting to block Egyptian troops
1973	Yom Kippur War	Battle of Marsa Talamat	At sea	7 October	Israel defeats Egyptian ships
1973	Yom Kippur War	Battle of Latakia	At sea	7 October	Israel defeats Syrian troops off the coast of Latakia
1973	Yom Kippur War	Romani ambush	(Egypt)	7 October	Successful Israeli ambush
1973	Yom Kippur War	Second Battle of Mount Hermon	(Syria)	8 October	Syrian victory
1973	Yom Kippur War	Battle of Baltim	At sea	8–9 October	Israel defeats Egyptian ships off the Egyptian coast
1973	Yom Kippur War	Syrian General Staff Headquarters raid	(Syria)	9 October	Israel successfully raids the general staff of Syria
1973	Yom Kippur War	Second Battle of Latakia	(Syria)	11 October	Inconclusive
1973	Yom Kippur War	Operation Gown	(Syria)	12 October	Israel destroys Syrian supply lines
1973	Yom Kippur War	Raid on al-Mazzah Airport	(Syria)	13 October	Israeli victory
1973	Yom Kippur War	Air battle of Mansoura	(Egypt)	14 October	Egyptian planes defeat an Israeli plane
1973	Yom Kippur War	Battle of the Sinai	(Egypt)	14 October	Israeli victory
1973	Yom Kippur War	Battle of The Chinese Farm	(Egypt)	15–17 October	Israeli victory
1973	Yom Kippur War	Operation Abirey-Halev	(Egypt)	15–23 October	Israeli victory
1973	Yom Kippur War	Egyptian 25th Brigade ambush	(Egypt)	17 October	Israeli victory
1973	Yom Kippur War	Battle of Ismailia	(Egypt)	18–22 October	Israel fails to block Egyptian supply lines
1973	Yom Kippur War	Third Battle of Mount Hermon	(Syria)	21–22 October	Israel captures the mountain after a third assault
1973	Yom Kippur War	Battle of Suez	(Egypt)	24–25 October	Egypt holds the Suez Canal
1973	Vietnam War	Battle of Quang Duc	(South Vietnam)	30 October 1973—10 December 1974	South Vietnamese victory
1974	Vietnam War	Battle of the Paracel Islands	(China)	19–20 January	Chinese victory
1974	Vietnam War	Battle of Tri Phap	(South Vietnam)	12 February—4 May	South Vietnamese victory
1974	Vietnam War, Cambodian Civil War	Battle of Kampot	(Cambodia)	26 February—2 April	
1974	Vietnam War	Battle of Svay Rieng	(Cambodia) / (South Vietnam)	27 March—2 May	South Vietnamese victory
1974	Vietnam War	Battle of the Iron Triangle	(South Vietnam)	16 May—20 November	South Vietnamese victory
1974	Vietnam War	Battle of Duc Duc	(South Vietnam)	18 July—4 October	North Vietnamese victory
1974	The Troubles	Attack on UDR Clogher barracks		2 May	
1974	Cyprus problem	Turkish invasion of Cyprus	(Cyprus)	20 July—16 August	
1974	Vietnam War	Battle of Thượng Ðức	(South Vietnam)	29 July—11 November	Costly for both sides; South Vietnam holds off North assault on Da Nang, but fails to capture Thuong Duc
1974	Vietnam War	Battle of Phú Lộc	(South Vietnam)	28 August—10 December	South Vietnamese victory
1974	Vietnam War	Battle of Phước Long	(South Vietnam)	12 December 1974—6 January 1975	Important North Vietnamese victory
1975	Vietnam War	Battle of Ban Me Thuot	(South Vietnam)	3–18 March	North Vietnam captures Tay Nguyen region, destroying South Vietnam's 2nd Corps in the process
1975	Vietnam War	Hue–Da Nang Campaign	(South Vietnam)	5 March—12 April	North Vietnam captures Huế and Da Nang with little resistance
1975	Vietnam War	Battle of Xuân Lộc	(South Vietnam)	9–12 April	Remnants of ARVN make a last stand in the final major battle of the Vietnam War
1975	Vietnam War	East Sea Campaign	At sea	9–29 April	North Vietnam captures the Spratly Islands in one of the last South Vietnamese-controlled places
1975	Cambodian Civil War, Vietnam War	Fall of Phnom Penh	(Khmer Republic)	17 April	The Khmer Rouge captures the Cambodian capital of Phnom Penh
1975	Vietnam War	Bombing of Tan Son Nhut Air Base	(South Vietnam)	28 April	First bombing by the Vietnamese Air Force
1975	Vietnam War	Fall of Saigon	(South Vietnam)	30 April	North Vietnam wins the Vietnam War
1975	Lebanese Civil War	Battle of the Hotels	(Lebanon)	23 October 1975—2 April 1976	Muslims and Christians end up divided in Western Beirut
1975	Cold War	Indonesia invades East Timor	(Timor-Leste)	7 December	
1975	Western Sahara War	Battles of La Güera and Tichla	(Spanish Sahara)	10–22 December	Mauritania occupies La Güera and Tichla

== 1976–1980 ==
Year	War	Battle	Loc.	Date(s)	Description
1976	Western Sahara War	First Battle of Amgala	(Western Sahara)	27–29 January	Algerian withdrawal
1976	Western Sahara War	Second Battle of Amgala	(Western Sahara)	14–15 February	Sahrawi victory
1976	The Troubles	Flagstaff Hill incident	(Republic of Ireland)	5–6 May	Irish Army pushes back British special forces
1976	Arab–Israeli conflict, Cold War	Operation Entebbe	(Uganda)	4 July	
1976	The Troubles	Garryhinch ambush	(Republic of Ireland)	16 October	IRA bombs Brits
1976	Rhodesian Bush War	Battle of Hill 31	(Rhodesia)	15 November	
1977	Arab Cold War	1977 Egyptian bread riots	(Egypt)	18–19 January	security forces clashes with the rioters, around 80 people were killed, The cut to subsidies was suspended and the riot died down
1977	Egyptian–Libyan War	Sallum raid	(Egypt)	21 July	Libyan 9th Tank Battalion carried out a raid on Sallum. The unit was ambushed by an Egyptian mechanised division forcing the battalion to retreat
1977	Ogaden War	Battle of Dire Dawa	(Ethiopia)	July—August	The Ethiopian Army inflicts heavy losses on the Somali National Army after a Somali attack by one tank battalion and a mechanized infantry brigade supported by artillery units
1977	Ogaden War	First Battle of Jijiga	(Ethiopia)	September	The Somalis, trying to take the town, lose more than half of their attacking force of three tank battalions, each of which includes more than 30 tanks
1977	Ogaden War	Battle of Harar	(Ethiopia)	October 1977—27 January 1978	A major battle of the Ogaden War
1978	The Troubles	British Army Gazelle downing	(Northern Ireland)	17 February	
1978	Ogaden War	Second Battle of Jijiga	(Ethiopia)	March	Three Somali tank battalions overwhelm an Ethiopian garrison. After inflicting some heavy losses on Somali armor, Ethiopian troops mutiny and withdraw from the town, leaving its defense to the militia, which is incapable of slowing the Somali advance.
1978	South African Border War	Battle of Cassinga	(Angola)		
1978	Lebanese Civil War	Battle of Kaukaba	(Lebanon)	9 May	
1978	Shaba II	Battle of Kolwezi	(Zaire)	18–22 May	
1979	Chadian Civil War	Battle of N'Djamena	(Chad)	12–15 February	
1979	Sino-Vietnamese War	Battle of Dong Dang	(Vietnam)	17–23 February	
1979	Sino-Vietnamese War	Battle of Lào Cai	(Vietnam)	17 February—5 March	
1979	Sino-Vietnamese War	Battle of Lạng Sơn 17 February—16 March	(Vietnam)		
1979	Uganda-Tanzania War	Battle of Masaka	(Uganda)	23–24 February	
1979	Uganda-Tanzania War	Battle of Tororo	(Uganda)	2–4 March	
1979	Uganda-Tanzania War	Battle of Lukaya	(Uganda)	10–11 March	
1979	Uganda-Tanzania War	Battle of Entebbe	(Uganda)	7 April	
1979	Uganda-Tanzania War	Battle of Jinja	(Uganda)	22 April	
1979	Uganda-Tanzania War	Battle of Lira	(Uganda)	15 May	
1979	Uganda-Tanzania War	Battle of Karuma Falls	(Uganda)	17 May	
1979	Uganda-Tanzania War	Battle of Bondo	(Uganda)	27 May	
1979	The Troubles	Warrenpoint ambush	(Northern Ireland)	27 August	
1979	Western Sahara War	First Battle of Al Mahbes	(Western Sahara)	14 October	Sahrawi victory
1979		Grand Mosque seizure	(Saudi Arabia)	20 November – 4 December	Saudi victory
1980	Chadian-Libyan conflict	Second Battle of N'Djamena	(Chad)	22 March—15 December	
1980	Iran–Iraq War	Siege of Abadan	(Iran)	November 1980—September 1981	Iraq attacks the Iranian city of Abadan but fails to capture it
1980	Iran–Iraq War	Liberation of Khorramshahr	(Iran)	November 1980—24 May 1982	The Iranians recapture of the port city of Khorramshahr from the Iraqis

== 1981–1985 ==
Year	War	Battle	Loc.	Date(s)	Description
1981	Iran–Iraq War	Battle of Dezful	(Iran)	5–9 January	Iranian armored regiments are forced to flee after an Iraqi ambush
1981	Great Mafia War	1st phase	(Italy)	23 April 1981 – 1983	Corleonesi Mafia clan victory
1981	Cold War	Gulf of Sidra incident	At sea	19 August	Two Sukhoi Su-22 are shot down by two U.S. F-14A Tomcats
1981	Western Sahara War	First Battle of Guelta Zemmur	(Western Sahara)	13–29 October	Sahrawi victory
1982	Falklands War	Battle of San Carlos	(Falkland Islands)	21–25 May	
1982	Falklands War	Battle of Seal Cove	(Falkland Islands)	23 May	
1982	Falklands War	Battle of Goose Green	(Falkland Islands)	28–29 May	
1982	1982 Lebanon War	Battle of the Beaufort	(Lebanon)	6–7 June	Israeli invasion of Lebanon
1982	1982 Lebanon War	Battle of Jezzine	(Lebanon)	8 June	
1982	1982 Lebanon War	Battle of Sultan Yacoub	(Lebanon)	10 June	
1982	Falklands War	Battle of Mount Harriet	(Falkland Islands)	11–12 June	
1982	Falklands War	Battle of Two Sisters	(Falkland Islands)	11–12 June	
1982	Falklands War	Battle of Mount Longdon	(Falkland Islands)	11–12 June	
1982	Falklands War	Battle of Wireless Ridge	(Falkland Islands)	13–14 June	
1982	Falklands War	Battle of Mount Tumbledown	(Falkland Islands)	13–14 June	
1982	1982 Lebanon War	Siege of Beirut	(Lebanon)	14 June—21 August	
1983	Organized crime in Denmark	Copenhagen Biker War	(Denmark)	24 Sep 1983-1986	Hells Angels victory .
1983	Cold War	Invasion of Grenada	(Grenada)	25 October—2 November	By U.S. forces
1983	Lebanese Civil War	Battle of Tripoli (1983)	(Lebanon)	3 November – 20 December	Pro-Syrian Palestinian victory, PLO driven out of Lebanon
1984	Iran–Iraq War	Battle of the Marshes	(Iraq)	February	Iran opens a new offensive in the lakes of the Hawizeh Marshes in Iraq
1984	Lebanese Civil War	February 6 Intifada	(Lebanon)	6 February	Lebanese National Resistance Front victory
1984	Siachen conflict	Operation Meghdoot	(India)	13 April	Battle between India and Pakistan in which India captures the entire Siachen Glacier
1984	Insurgency in Punjab, India	Operation Blue Star	(India)	6 June	
1985	western Sahara war	Second Battle of Al Mahbes	(Western Sahara)	12 January	Sahrawi forces break through a wall put up by Morocco
1985	Yama–Ichi War	1985 Osaka gun battles	(Japan)	26 Jan	after Yakuza boss Takenaka’s assassination, there were dozens of gunfights in Osaka between Yamaguchi-gumi and Ichiwa-kai
1985		1985 MOVE bombing	(United States)	13 may	61 houses destroyed, 11 people killed

== 1986–1990 ==
Year	War	Battle	Loc.	Date(s)	Description
1986	Iran–Iraq War	First Battle of Al Faw	(Iraq)	10 February – 10 March	Iranians launch a surprise attack against the Iraqi troops defending the al-Faw Peninsula
1986	Arab Cold War	1986 Egyptian conscripts riot	(Egypt)	25–28 February	the Central Security Forces launched a mutiny in Cairo but were defeated the Egyptian Army
1986	Cold War	Action in the Gulf of Sidra	At sea	24 March	U.S. naval operations against Libya
1987	Toyota War	Battle of Fada	(Chad)	2 January	
1987	Iran-Iraq War	Siege of Basra	(Iraq)	8 Jan-April	Iraq repel's Iran's offensive in the largest battle of the Iran-Iraq War.
1987	Lebanese Civil War	Fathallah barracks raid	(Lebanon)	24 February	Hizbollah headquarters taken over by the Syrian Army, 20 Hizbollah supporters executed
1987	Toyota War	Battle of B'ir Kora	(Chad)	18–20 March	
1987	The Troubles	Loughgall ambush	(United Kingdom)	8 May	
1987	Toyota War	Battle of Aouzou	(Chad)	8–28 August	
1987	Iran–Saudi Arabia proxy war	1987 Mecca incident	(Saudi Arabia)	31 July	275 Iranians, 85 Saudi policemen, and 42 pilgrims from other countries killed
1987	South African Border War, Angolan Civil War	Battle of Cuito Cuanavale	(Angola)	14 August 1987—23 March 1988	South African victory against Angola
1987	Toyota War	Battle of Maaten al-Saara	(Libya)	5 September	
1987	Western Sahara War	Battles of Farsia and Oum Dreyga	(Western Sahara)	18 November	Inconclusive
1988	Eritrean War of Independence, Ethiopian Civil War	Battle of Afabet	(Eritrea)	17–20 March	A decisive Eritrean victory over Ethiopia
1988	Iran–Iraq War	Second Battle of Al Faw	(Iraq)	17 April	Newly restructured Iraqi Army conducts a major operation to clear the Iranians out of the peninsula
1988	Iran–Iraq War	Operation Praying Mantis	At sea	18 April	One day U.S./Iranian naval action
1988	Iran–Iraq War	Operation Mersad	(Iran)	26–30 July	Islamic Republic of Iran victory
1988	Bougainville conflict	Raids on Panguna mine	(Papua New Guinea)	November 1988-15 May 1989	Bougainville Revolutionary Army attacked and raided the Panguna mine until it was announced closed .
1989	Cold War	Gulf of Sidra incident	At sea	4 January	Two Libyan MiG-23 Flogger Es are shot down by U.S. F-14A Tomcats
1989	Western Sahara War	Second Battle of Guelta Zemmur	(Western Sahara)	7 October	Moroccan victory
1989	Western Sahara War	Battle of Hausa	(Western Sahara)	11 October	Moroccan victory
1989	Western Sahara War	Third Battle of Amgala	(Western Sahara)	8 November	Last military operation of the Western Sahara War until the 90s
1989	The Troubles	Attack on Derryard checkpoint	(Northern Ireland)	13 December	
1989	Cold War	Operation Just Cause	(Panama)	20 December	American invasion of Panama
1990	The Troubles	1990 British Army Gazelle shootdown	(Northern Ireland)	11 February	
1990	The Troubles	Operation Conservation	(Northern Ireland)	6 May	
1990	Gulf War	Battle of the Bridges	(Kuwait)	2 August	Iraqi victory
1990	Arab–Israeli conflict	Ein Netafim ambush	(Israel)	26 November	Egyptian border guard kills Three Israeli soldiers and one civilian then retreats back across the border into Egypt, Palestinian Islamic Jihad claims responsibility.

== 1991–1995 ==
Year	War	Battle	Loc.	Date(s)	Description
1991	Gulf War	Battle of Khafji	(Saudi Arabia)	29 January—1 February	First major ground engagement of the Gulf War
1991	Gulf War	Liberation of Kuwait	(Kuwait) / (Iraq) /At sea	24–28 February	
1991	Gulf War	Battle of 73 Easting	(Iraq)	26–27 February	A decisive tank battle fought between Coalition armoured forces against those of the Iraqi Republican Guard
1991	Gulf War	Battle of Medina Ridge	(Iraq)	27 February	A decisive tank battle fought between the U.S. 1st Armored Division and the 2nd Brigade of the Iraqi Republican Guard
1991	The Troubles	Mullacreevie ambush	(Northern Ireland)	1 March 1991	
1991	The Troubles	Coagh ambush	(Northern Ireland)	3 June	
1991	Croatian War of Independence	Battle of Vukovar	(Croatia)	25 August—18 November	
1991	Croatian War of Independence	Battle of the Barracks	(Croatia)	14 September—23 November	
1992	The Troubles	Clonoe ambush	(Northern Ireland)	16 February	
1992	Bosnian War/Yugoslav Wars	Siege of Sarajevo	(Bosnia and Herzegovina)	5 April 1992—29 February 1996	
1992	Bosnian War/Yugoslav Wars	Battle of Žuč	(Bosnia and Herzegovina)	8 June	
1992	The Troubles	Attack on Cloghoge checkpoint	(Northern Ireland)	1 May	
1992	Great Mafia War	2nd phase	(Italy)	15 May 1992–15 Jan 1993	Italian Government end the power of Corleonesi Mafia clan, Salvatore Riina arrested
1992	Transnistria War	Battle of Tighina	(Moldova)	19–21 June	
1992	Croatian War of Independence	Battle of the Miljevci Plateau	(Croatia)	21–23 June	
1992	Bosnian War	Operation Corridor	(Bosnia and Herzegovina)	24 June—6 October	Army of the Republika Srpska defeats joint forces of the Croatian Defence Council and the Army of the Republic of Bosnia and Herzegovina and creates the Brčko corridor, connecting two eastern and western parts of Republic of Srpska, while Croatian and Bosniak (Muslim) forces suffered large casualties
1992	War in Abkhazia	Battle of Sukhumi	(Georgia (country))	14–18 August	Georgian forces repulse Abkhaz rebels
1992	War in Abkhazia	Battle of Gagra	(Georgia (country))	1–6 October	Abkhaz insurgents and North Caucasian militants capture Gagra from Georgian forces
1992	War in Abkhazia	Siege of Tkvarcheli	(Georgia (country))	October 1992—29 September 1993	Abkhazian forces break the Georgian siege
1993	Croatian War of Independence	Operation Maslenica	(Croatia)	22 January—1 February	
1993	Angolan Civil War	55 Day War	(Angola)	9 January—6 March	
1993		Waco siege	(United States)	28 February – 19 April	Mount Carmel Center burned down, 4 ATF agents killed, 82 Branch Davidians killed including 28 children
1993	First Nagorno-Karabakh War	Battle of Kelbajar	(Azerbaijan)	27 March—3 April	Armenians and Azeris fight for disputed territories
1993	Croat–Bosniak War	Battle of Žepče	(Bosnia and Herzegovina)	24 June	
1993	Croat–Bosniak War	Battle of Bugojno	(Bosnia and Herzegovina)	18–29 July	
1993	The Troubles	Battle of Newry Road	(Northern Ireland)	23 September	Gun battle between British Army helicopters and Provisional Irish Republican Army armed trucks
1993	Somali Civil War	Battle of Mogadishu	(Somalia)	3–4 October	Policing mission gone wrong; U.S. soldiers trapped against militia in a populated city
1993	Sri Lankan Civil War	Battle of Pooneryn	(Sri Lanka)	11–14 November	
1993	The Troubles	Fivemiletown ambush	(Northern Ireland)	12 December	
1994	Chiapas conflict	Zapatista uprising	(Mexico)	1–12 January	Battles between Mexican Army and Zapatista rebels
1994		Nordic Biker War	(Denmark) (Finland) (Sweden) (Norway)	22 Jan 1994—25 September 1997	
1994	The Troubles	1994 British Army Lynx shootdown		19 March	
1994	Afghan Civil War	Battle of Kabul	(Afghanistan)	28 April 1992—27 September 1996	
1994		Invasion of Kandahar City	(Afghanistan)	October—November	Afghanistan's Islamic State of Afghanistan (United Front) ousted by Islamic Emirate of Afghanistan (Taliban)
1994	Karen conflict	Fall of Manerplaw	(Myanmar)	11 December 1994—27 January 1995	Myanmar Army and DKBA soldiers capture and occupy the headquarters of the Karen National Union
1994	Karen conflict	Battle of Kawmoora	(Myanmar)	19 December 1994—21 February 1995	The Myanmar Army capture the final stronghold of the Karen National Union
1995	First Chechen War	First battle of Grozny	(Russia)	31 December 1994—8 February 1995	Russian Army captures Grozny
1995	Croatian War of Independence	Operation Flash	(Croatia)	1–3 May	
1995	Quebec Biker War	Operation Carcajou	(Canada)	5 October	Canadian police attempt to end the war between Hells Angels and the Rock Machine but fails and the violence continues.
1995	Bosnian War	Battle of Orašje	(Bosnia and Herzegovina)	5 May—10 June	
1995	Bosnian War	Battle of Vrbanja Bridge	(Bosnia and Herzegovina)	27 May	
1995	Croatian War of Independence, Bosnian War, Inter-Bosnian Muslim War	Operation Storm	(Croatia)	4–8 August	

== 1996–2000 ==
Year	War	Battle	Loc.	Date(s)	Description
1996	First Chechen War	Battle of Grozny	(Russia)	Chechen rebels recapture the city	
1997	Sri Lankan Civil War	Battle of Vavunathivu	(Sri Lanka)	7 March	
1997	Sierra Leone Civil War	Siege of Freetown	(Sierra Leone)	25 May 1997 – 6 February 1998	
1997	Sri Lankan Civil War	Battle of Kanakarayankulam	(Sri Lanka)	4 December	
1998	Kosovo War	Battle of Belaćevac Mine	(Socialist Federal Republic of Yugoslavia)	23–30 June	A coal mine critical to the electricity supply of Kosovo is temporarily captured by the Kosovo Liberation Army from the Yugoslav Army
1998	Kosovo War	Battle of Glodjane	(Socialist Federal Republic of Yugoslavia)	11–12 August	Glodjane retaken by the Yugoslav Army from the Kosovo Liberation Army
1998	South African farm attacks	Outeniqua Pass shootout	(South Africa)	11 August	A man engaged in a shootout with the police after a car and helicopter chase in Outeniqua Pass. He was shot and arrested for the murder of four people on a farm.
1998	Second Congo War	Battle for Kinshasa	(Democratic Republic of the Congo)	26–30 August	Rwanda fails to take Kinshasa from the Democratic Republic of the Congo and Zimbabwe
1998	Sri Lankan Civil War	Battle of Kilinochchi	(Sri Lanka)	27–29 September	Liberation Tigers of Tamil Eelam captures Kilinochchi from the Sri Lanka Army
1998	Korean Conflict	Battle of Yeosu	(South Korea)	17–18 December	North Korean semi-submersible vessel intercepted and sunk by Republic of Korea Navy
1998	Kosovo War	Battle of Podujevo	(Socialist Federal Republic of Yugoslavia)	23–27 December	
1998	Post-Suharto era in Indonesia	Poso riots	(Indonesia)	25 December 1998 – 20 December 2001	Muslim and Christian militias fought each other. Fighting ended with the Malino I Declaration.
1999	Post-Suharto era in Indonesia	Maluku sectarian conflict	(Indonesia)	14 January 1999 – 13 February 2002	Muslim and Christian militias fought each other as well as the Indonesia army. Fighting ended with the Malino II Accord.
1999	Kosovo War	Battle of Košare	(Socialist Federal Republic of Yugoslavia)	9 April–10 June	
1999	Kargil War	Battle of Tololing	(India)	May–June	Indian victory
1999	Kashmir conflict, Indio-Pakistani War of 1999	Kargil War	(India)	3 May–26 July	Pakistani paramilitary forces infiltrate India's Kargil district; after two months of fighting, there was a ceasefire and return to status quo. The battle ended with an Indian victory.
1999	1999 East Timorese crisis	Battle of Aidabasalala	(Timor-Leste)	16 October	Australian special forces victory
1999	Second Chechen War	Battle of Grozny	(Russia)	25 December 1999—6 February 2000	Russian Army sieges Grozny in December, captures it in February 2000
2000	Moro conflict	Operation Valiancy	(Philippines)	15–17 February	Philippine forces defeat Islamists
2000	Second Chechen War	Battle of Komsomolskoye	(Russia)	6–24 March	Russian Army destroys a remnant Chechen group that escaped Grozny
2000	Moro conflict	Operation Audacity	(Philippines)	15–21 March	Philippine forces defeat Moro Islamic Liberation Front hideouts
2000	Sierra Leone Civil War	Lungi Lol confrontation	(Sierra Leone)	17 May	UK repulses a Revolutionary United Front attack during the British military intervention in the Sierra Leone Civil War
2000	Moro conflict	Battle of Camp Abubakar	(Philippines)	9 July	
