= Battle of Prek Klok =

The Battle of Prek Klok may refer to one of two battles during Operation Junction City in the Vietnam War:

- Battle of Prek Klok I
- Battle of Prek Klok II
