= Geoffrey Cheney Ferris =

Recipient of the Distinguished Service Cross

- Born: April 8, 1918; New Haven, Connecticut, U.S.
- Died: May 7, 1943 (aged 25); Beja, Tunisia
- Burial place: Long Island National Cemetery, Suffolk County, New York, U.S.
- Military career
- Allegiance: United States of America
- Branch: United States Army; Connecticut National Guard
- Service years: 1940–1941, 1942–1943
- Rank: Second Lieutenant (US)
- Nickname: Jeff
- Units: 6th Battalion, 33rd Field Artillery Regiment, 1st Infantry Division
- Conflicts: World War II: Operation Torch
- Awards: Distinguished Service Cross; Silver Star; Purple Heart

Geoffrey Cheney Ferris (April 8, 1918 – May 7, 1943) was a United States Army soldier during World War II who received the Distinguished Service Cross for his actions as a Forward Observer during Operation Torch near Beja, Tunisia. Ferris Barracks in Erlangen, Germany, was named in his honor in 1949.

== Early life and education ==
Geoffrey Cheney Ferris was born on April 8, 1918, in New Haven, Connecticut. He was the youngest of four children born to Walter Lewis Ferris and Alice Josephine Cheney. He attended the Roxbury School (now Cheshire Academy) in Cheshire, Connecticut. Next to his photograph in his high school yearbook is printed "None but himself can be his parallel".

== Career ==
Prior to joining the Army, Ferris joined the Connecticut National Guard as a private on September 19, 1940. He was commissioned as a second lieutenant on February 24, 1941, holding that grade until his separation on December 4, 1941. Ferris enlisted in the Army as a private on January 23, 1942, at Hartford, Connecticut. After Officer Candidate School Class 23-42 at Fort Sill, Oklahoma, he was commissioned as a second lieutenant and served as an artillery observer assigned to the 6th Battalion, 33rd Field Artillery Regiment, 1st Infantry Division. On the morning of May 6, 1943, Lieutenant Ferris reported to Company E, 26th Infantry Regiment. Seeing that it was impossible to secure a suitable observation post in the area occupied by Company E, Lieutenant Ferris, carrying a field phone and wire reel, advanced several hundred yards beyond the front lines before being mortally wounded by enemy fire. He died the next day. Initially interred in Tunisia, he was re-interred at the Long Island National Cemetery in New York. Lieutenant Ferris was posthumously awarded the Silver Star and the Distinguished Service Cross for his actions.

== Distinguished Service Cross Citation ==
The President of the United States of America, authorized by Act of Congress, July 9, 1918, takes pride in presenting the Distinguished Service Cross (Posthumously) to Second Lieutenant (Field Artillery) Geoffrey C. Ferris (ASN: 0-420345), United States Army, for extraordinary heroism in connection with military operations against an armed enemy while serving with the 6th Battalion, 33d Field Artillery Regiment, 1st Infantry Division, in action against enemy forces on 6 May 1943, near Beja, Tunisia.

On the morning of 6 May 1943, the 33d Artillery Regiment was given the mission of taking Hill 139 in the vicinity of Beja, Tunisia. Because of the heavy machine gun and mortar fire covering all approaches, it was necessary to attack before daylight. Second Lieutenant Ferris, as artillery forward observer with the assault elements, crawled forward across open terrain swept by withering enemy machine gun fire to a point well beyond our lines. Realizing the danger of his mission, he had ordered his men to remain behind while he advanced with a wire reel and telephone until he was killed. The unselfish heroism and the courage and zeal with which Second Lieutenant Ferris performed this deed exemplify the highest traditions of the military forces of the United States and reflect great credit upon himself, the 1st Infantry Division, and the United States Army.

General Orders: Headquarters, U.S. Army-North African Theater of Operations, General Orders No. 47 (July 6, 1943).

Ferris was awarded the Distinguished Service Cross (posthumously) on July 6, 1943. He was further awarded the Silver Star on August 14, 1943.

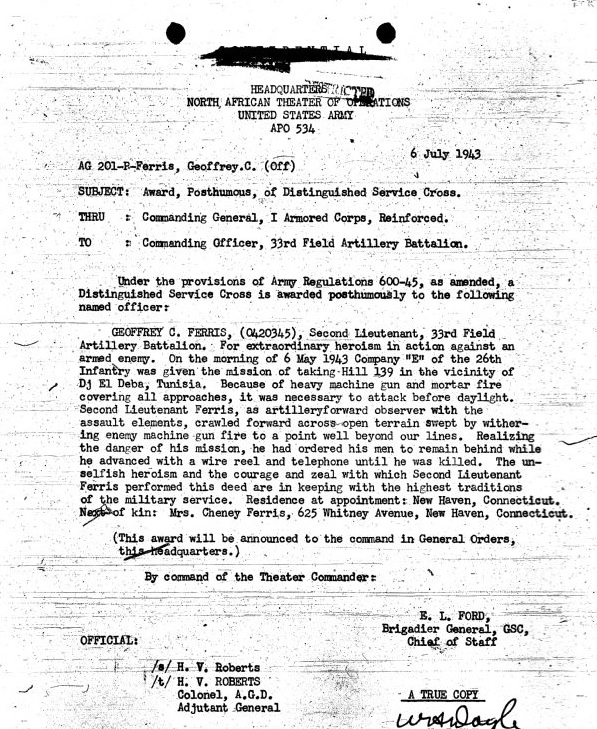
DSC Award

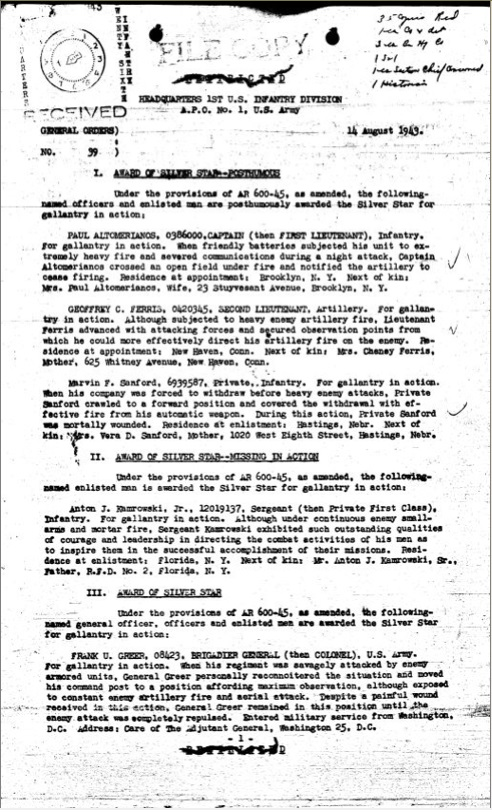
Silver Star Award

== Ferris Barracks ==
Panzer Kaserne (English: Tank Barracks) in Erlangen, Germany, was officially designated Ferris Barracks in honor of Second Lieutenant (2LT) Geoffery C. Ferris on May 11, 1949, by General Lucius D. Clay, then head of the European Command. The facility may have been known informally as Ferris Barracks before that date; purportedly named by General George S. Patton upon his arrival in Erlangen on April 22, 1945.

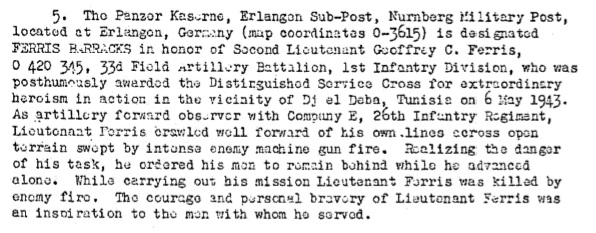
Excerpt of General Order 41.

== Awards and recognitions ==
Geoffrey Ferris' decorations and medals include:

Distinguished Service Cross	Silver Star	Purple Heart

== See also ==
- Awards and decorations of the United States Army
- Ferris Barracks
- List of United States Army installations in Germany
