= Chánh Phú Hòa =

Chánh Phú Hòa Phường Chánh Phú Hòa Chánh Lưu, Phú Hưng
- Ward
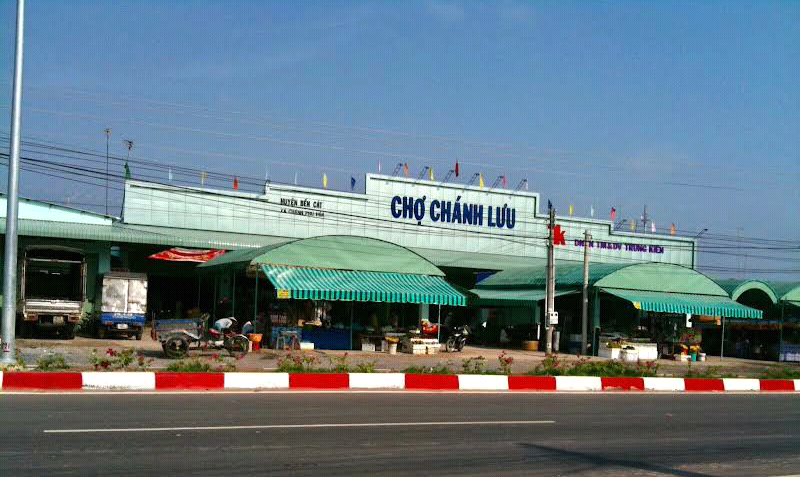
- Chánh Lưu Market
- Interactive map of Chánh Phú Hòa
- Coordinates: 11°09′40″N 106°39′09″E
- Country: Vietnam
- Municipality: Ho Chi Minh City
- Established: June 16, 2025

Area
  - Total: 26.85 sq mi (69.54 km^{2})

Population (2024)
  - Total: 53,916
  - Density: 2,008/sq mi (775.3/km^{2})
- Time zone: UTC+07:00 (Indochina Time)
- Administrative code: 25837

Chánh Phú Hòa (Vietnamese: Phường Chánh Phú Hòa) is a ward of Ho Chi Minh City, Vietnam. It is one of the 168 new wards, communes and special zones of the city following the reorganization in 2025.

== History ==
On June 16, 2025, the National Assembly Standing Committee issued Resolution No. 1685/NQ-UBTVQH15 on the arrangement of commune-level administrative units of Ho Chi Minh City in 2025 (effective from June 16, 2025). Accordingly, the entire land area and population of Chánh Phú Hòa ward of the former Bến Cát city and Hưng Hòa commune of the former Bàu Bàng district will be integrated into a new ward named Chánh Phú Hòa (Clause 96, Article 1).
