= Second battle of Bàu Bàng =

Part of the Vietnam War (1967)

Second battle of Bau Bang
- Part of Operation Junction City, Vietnam War
| Date | 19–20 March 1967 |
| Location | Bàu Bàng, Tay Ninh Province, South Vietnam |
| Result | US victory |

Belligerents
| United States | Viet Cong |

Commanders and leaders
| Sidney S. Haszard | Unknown |

Units involved
| Troop A, 5th Cavalry Regiment | 9th Division: Two battalions |

Strength
| | ~600 |

Casualties and losses
| 3 killed VC Claim: 400 killed 63 vehicles destroyed | US body count: 227 killed 3 captured |

The second battle of Bàu Bàng occurred during the night of 19–20 March 1967 during Operation Junction City, a search and destroy mission by American military forces in Tay Ninh Province of South Vietnam, to the west of the capital Saigon.

Forces from the Third Squadron, 5th Cavalry Regiment were entrusted with the securing of Fire Support Base 20, around 1.5 km north of the village of Bàu Bàng. They expected an attack, as the area was a known Viet Cong (VC) stronghold. During the evening of 19 March, elements of the VC 9th Division attacked the base with machine guns, mortars, rockets and small arms fire. Initially, they swarmed over the American armored vehicles, but were dispersed by the vehicles firing on one another, although some of the vehicles were destroyed. With the help of artillery and air strikes, as well as flares and aerial searchlights to spot their enemies, the Americans repelled the Viet Cong. U.S. forces claimed 227 VC killed and captured three, while losing 3 and suffering 63 wounded.

== Background ==
The First Battle of Ap Bau Bang occurred on 11–12 November 1965. It was the first major U.S. battle of the Vietnam War using armored vehicles.

At 11:50 on 19 March 1967, Troop A, 3/5th Cavalry, commanded by Captain Raoul H. Alcala deployed within the perimeter of Fire Support Base 20. A unit of the 1st Brigade, 9th Infantry Regiment, but attached to the 1st Infantry Division, Troop A had 129 men, six M48 tanks, twenty M113 armored personnel carriers (APCs), and three 4.2-inch mortar carriers. The troop formed into a circular (wagon train) perimeter defense. Their mission was to secure the base for B Battery (105-mm.) of the 7th Battalion, 9th Artillery Regiment, commanded by Captain Duane W. Marion.

Fire Support Base 20 was located in relatively flat terrain 1.5 km north of the village of Ap Bau Bang and immediately west of Route 13. To the south of the position was a rubber plantation, while wooded areas were prominent to the north and west. An abandoned railway ran parallel to and thirty meters east of the highway.

American intelligence sources had indicated that the area was densely populated with VC guerrillas, noting the existence of a well-used trail to the north of Fire Support Base 20 which ran east and west. Alcala sent his 2nd Platoon commanded by First Lieutenant Harlan E. Short to establish an ambush along the trail at a point 1.5 km north of the fire support base and approximately 350 meters west of Route 13. The ambush was to be in position by 1800. The perimeter was manned on the west by the 1st Platoon, commanded by First Lieutenant Roger A. Festa and to the east by the 3rd Platoon under Second Lieutenant Hiram M. Wolfe, IV.

== Battle ==
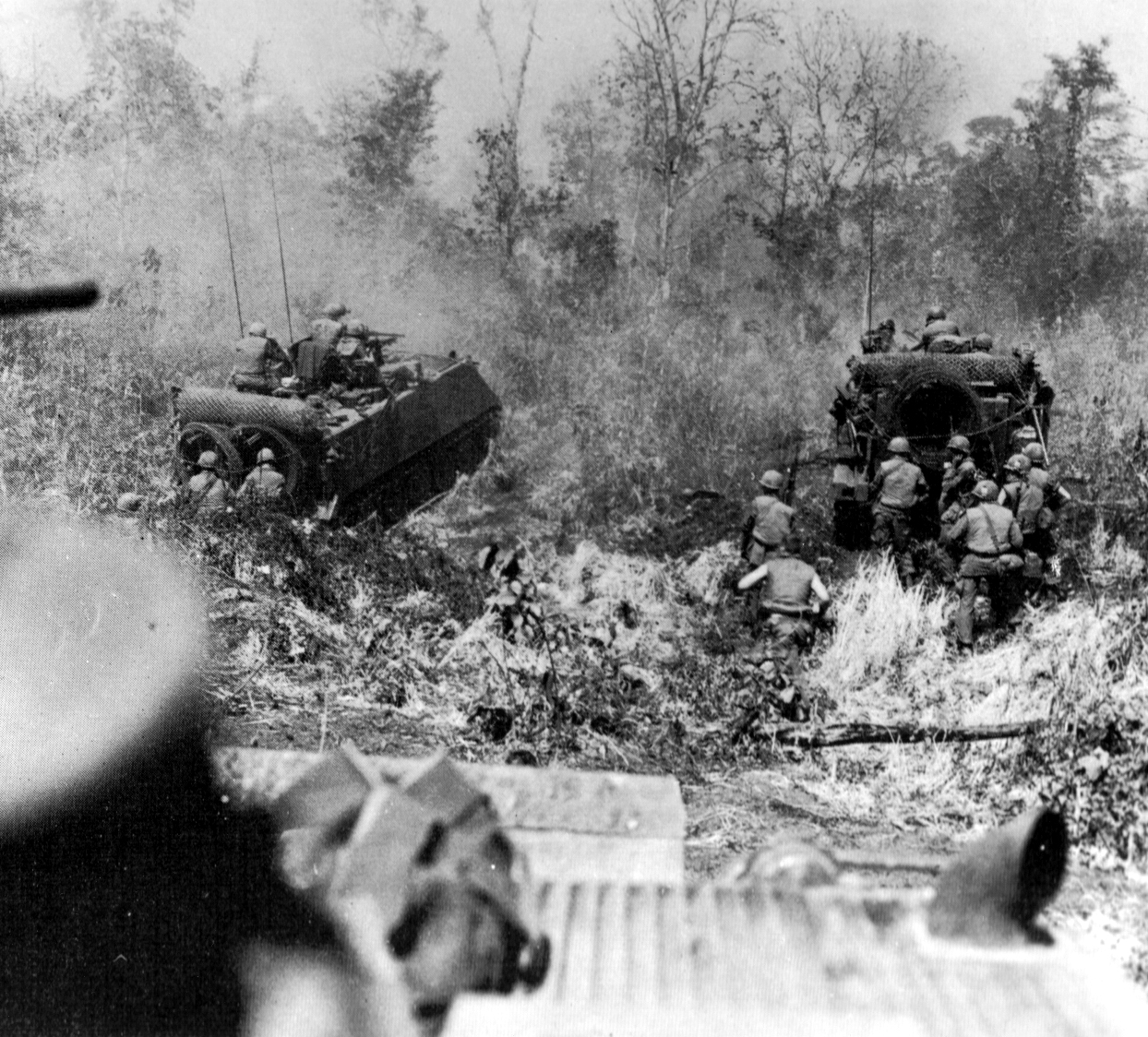
Ap Bau Bang II was the heaviest clash of Operation Junction City. At one point, the VC sought to overcome the advantage of US mechanization by swarming over the actual vehicles. US forces had M113 APCs, such as these, and even a half-dozen full M48 battle tanks at their disposal.

At 2250 that night a VC probe signaled the start of the battle. The probe was spearheaded by a herd of fifteen belled cattle driven across Route 13 at a point 150 meters northeast of the perimeter. At 2300 the VC opened fire on the northeast section of the perimeter with a wheel-mounted .50-caliber machine gun positioned on the railway embankment. One tank trained its searchlight on the VC machine gun position and returned fire along with three APCs for around three minutes. The VC machine gun fired five separate bursts before it was destroyed by the Americans.

During the lull that followed, reconnaissance by fire was conducted by Wolfe's tank along the wood line to the east beyond the railway. At 2310, Captain Alcala reported that firing had ended and that infrared equipment was being used to detect the VC.

At 0030 on 20 March, the VC resumed their attack, hitting Fire Support Base 20 with mortar rounds, rifle grenades, rockets, and recoilless rifle fire. This was the start of the main phase of the battle. Festa's track was hit by fire coming from the west, wounding his sergeant. Alcala requested artillery support from the battalion at FSB 20 and units further away in Lai Khe.

The Americans concluded that the VC mortar positions were 1.5–2 kilometers west of Ap Bau Bang in and around an old village that had been destroyed. The positions were located by radar from Lai Khe, although one officer thought that airborne artillery observers seeing the flashes were more effective.

The VC fire increased in intensity and two M113s were hit, wounding several Americans and destroying the vehicles. Two 3rd Platoon tanks were hit, but were not disabled. Throughout the mortar and antitank bombardment, Alcala maintained radio contact with his squadron commander, Lieutenant Colonel Sidney S. Haszard, who was located to the south. Within 20 minutes of the start of the mortar attack, the VC ground assault began. The main attack came from the south and southwest, accompanied by a secondary attack from the north. These were the troops of the 273rd Regiment, who had been waiting in position in the rubber trees before moving forward under mortar fire cover, wearing dark clothes.

Captain Alcala advised his superiors at 0050 that he felt able to repel the attack, but he asked for a ready reaction force to be readied. Colonel Haszard then alerted the 1st Platoon of Troop B and the 3rd Platoon of Troop C to the north and south of Ap Bau Bang respectively to move to Fire Support Base 20. He gave Alcala permission to recall his 2nd Platoon from the ambush site to the perimeter. Haszard noted the growing size of the VC offensive and decided to move with his command element to A Troop's position.

In the 3rd Platoon sector on the eastern side of the perimeter, Wolfe detected VC movement and requested night illumination from a 4.2-inch mortar, which revealed VC troops crossing the highway from east to west. Wolfe's men fired and the VC stopped, having struck one American vehicle's gun. By 0100 an AC-47 Spooky gunship and a light fire team of helicopter gunships were sent to aid Wolfe's platoon.

The VC on the southwest portion of the base perimeter were swarming over some of the APCs. Track 17 responded by firing canister ammunition at the impacted tracks to remove the VC, as they were too close for an APC to clear from itself. This killed the VC, but in one case, VC mortar fire hit simultaneously, blowing up the APC, killing one and injuring many others. Later Wolfe's track was directly hit for a second time by an RPG-2 rocket. The entire crew was wounded and evacuated.

At the same time, the 2nd Platoon returned along Route 13 from its ambush site, the men firing intermittently as they came. They crossed to the southern half of the perimeter under the heaviest VC attack. As they took their positions, they were hit with recoilless rifle fire and grenades.

The elements of Troops B and C moved in to assist their colleagues. The 3rd Platoon of Troop C, moved up Route 13 from their position five kilometers to the south, driving through a barrage of fire before reaching the base perimeter at 0127. At the direction of Alcala, the platoon swept 1.5 km south of the defenders along the rubber tree line. Firing continually during their sweep, they turned west, then north, before doubling back and entering the perimeter from the southeast. The vehicles took up positions between Troop A's vehicles on the eastern part of the perimeter defense. At the same time the 1st Platoon of Troop B moved down Route 13 from its position eight kilometers north. After knocking past a hastily built communist ambush just north of the perimeter, they moved around to the south. Moving into the perimeter, the platoon took up positions between Troop A's vehicles on the western half of the defensive ring.

The perimeter now contained the artillery battery, all of Troop A, and the two relief platoons, which provided a large quantity of armor. Alcala expanded the perimeter by 40 m with a counterattack at 02:20. Several VC who attempted to remove the .50-caliber machine gun from one of the burning tracks of Festa's unit were killed, as were others trying to storm the foxholes containing the wounded. While fighting continued, part of Festa's unit were trying to evacuate their wounded.

Meanwhile, Haszard travelled in an APC followed by another bearing his command group as they tried to move into the perimeter. Close to the perimeter, Haszard's APC was disabled by VC fire. Alcala sent a tank out of the perimeter to help. Haszard was fired on as he left the APC to attach the towline. The command APC, and its communications equipment, was safely pulled into the perimeter without losses to the communists.

At 0300 another attack began on the southern perimeter. Alcala concluded that it was an attempt by the VC to recover bodies. The attackers were followed by a line of unarmed troops carrying ropes and wires with hooks to recover the fallen. The attacking force was stopped within 15 m of the perimeter.

During the attempted retrieval operation, and for the next four hours, gunship fire and air strikes hit the VC from above. An Air Force flareship kept the battle area continually lighted. Initially the artillery covered the northwest, west, and southwest sides of the perimeter while aircraft attacked on a north–south axis east of Route 13. Later a switch was made and the aircraft attack runs were made from east to west on the south and southwest sides of the perimeter.

During the battle, resupply and medical evacuation missions continued. Due to the nature of the battle and the abundant use of automatic weapons on armored vehicles, two and in some cases three basic loads of .50-caliber and 7.62mm. ammunition were expended. At 0330 the VC fire eased; resupply of the units and evacuation of the wounded was completed during the next 75 minutes while the artillery and air strikes continued. Of the 63 wounded, 26 were evacuated.

By 0450 flares and tank searchlights spotted the VC massing for an attack on the south and southeastern sides of the base. The VC started their attack ten minutes later, and they were met with artillery fire, cluster bomb units, napalm and 500 pound bombs. This last wave of firepower ended the attack. At 0700 the final air strike and artillery rounds were fired.

== Aftermath ==
During the battle of Ap Bau Bang II, the Americans claimed to have killed at least 227 VC and captured 3, as well as much equipment and weapons. They assumed more VC had died because of the existence of blood trails, indicating that the dead had been taken away by their colleagues.

Although more infantry than usual were killed by small arms fire, they were attacking cavalry and armored units, most VC deaths in this battle still resulted from artillery and air strikes. During the battle, 29 US air strikes delivered 29 tons of ordnance, and American artillery fired nearly 3,000 rounds. The Americans reported their battle losses at 3 killed and 63 wounded. VC prisoners confessed that they were from the 2nd and 3rd Battalions of the 273rd Regiment of the 9th Division. American intelligence analysts believed that the whole regiment participated.

The VC claim to have eliminated 400 enemy troops and destroyed 63 armored vehicles.

Following the battle, General Hay wrote a propaganda letter to the 9th Division commander, taunting him about their defeat. The letter was translated into Vietnamese, and leaflets were dropped into the VC area. The original English version read:

This is to advise you that during the battle of Ap Bau Bang on 20 March the Regimental Commander of Q763 (273d Regiment) and his Battalion Commanders disgraced themselves by performing in an un-soldierly manner. During this battle with elements of this Division and attached units your officers failed to accomplish their mission and left the battlefield covered with dead and wounded from their units. We have buried your dead and taken care of your wounded from this battle.
