= Battle of Prek Klok II =

1967 battle in the Vietnam War

- Part of Operation Junction City, Vietnam War
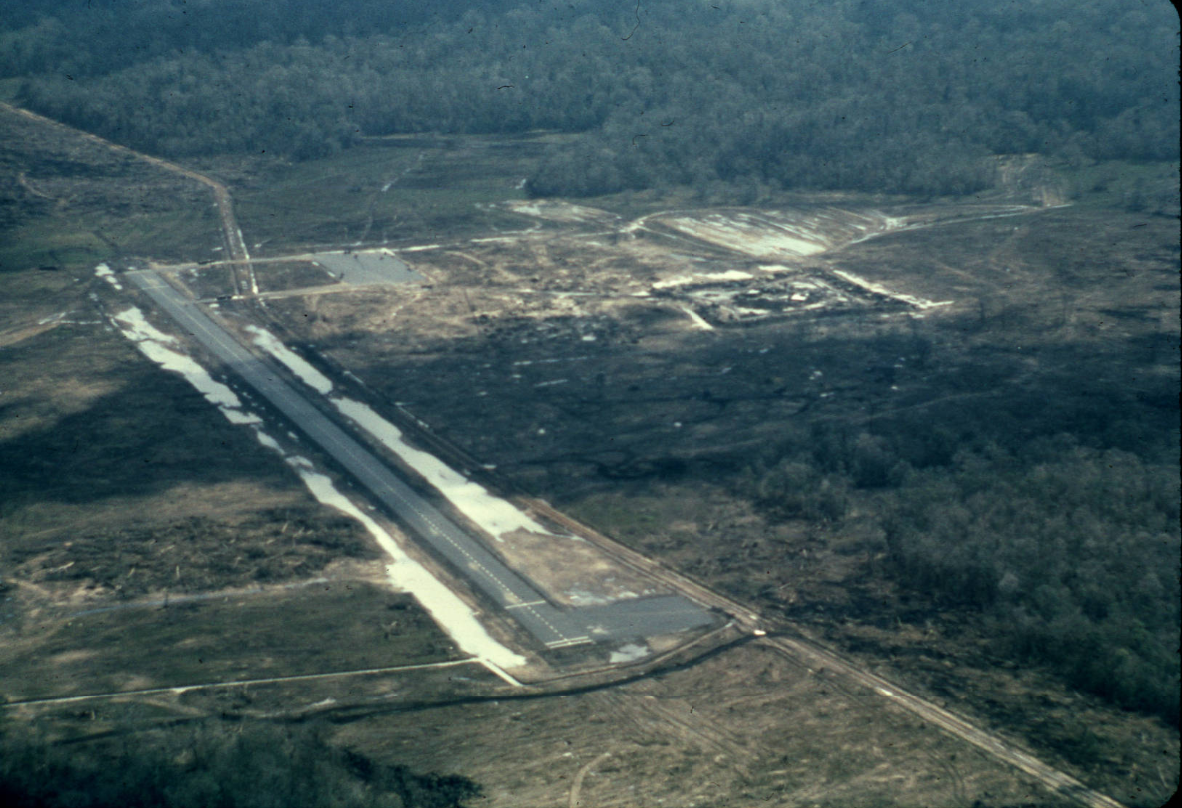
- Prek Klok, 24 April 1967
| Date | March 10, 1967 |
| Location | Prek Klok, Tay Ninh Province South Vietnam 11°29′N 106°12′E |
| Result | US victory |

Belligerents
| United States | Viet Cong |

Commanders and leaders
| Lt. Col. Edward J. Collins | Unknown |

Units involved
| 2nd Battalion, 2nd Infantry Regiment (Mechanized); Batteries B and C, 2nd Battalion, 33rd Artillery Regiment | 272nd Regiment |

Strength
| | Two battalions |

Casualties and losses
| 3 killed | US body count: 197 killed 5 captured 12 weapons recovered |

The Battle of Prek Klok II occurred on March 10, 1967, during Operation Junction City when American military forces were conducting a search and destroy operation against the Viet Cong (VC) forces in Tay Ninh Province west of the capital of South Vietnam, Saigon. During the course of the operation they had already had a significant engagement in the Battle of Prek Klok I. During the night, Artillery Fire Support Patrol Base II at Prek Klok was attacked by two communist battalions, resulting in a short battle. This was the second major battle of Operation Junction City. The VC started by mortaring the base and launching anti-tank fire at the M113 armored personnel carriers (APCs) surrounding the base. Attacks came from the north and east, followed by an infantry charge out of wooded areas from the southwest. With the help of air strikes from nearby planes, as well as artillery and ample supplies flown in by helicopter, the Americans easily repelled the communist attack. The Americans killed 197 VC but lost only three of their men.

== Background ==
On the evening of 10 March, the 2nd Battalion, 2nd Infantry Regiment (Mechanized) (minus Company B), commanded by Lieutenant Colonel Edward J. Collins, was securing the perimeter of Artillery Fire Support Patrol Base II located at Prek Klok on Route 4, 20 kilometres (12 mi) north of Nui Ba Den. Inside the circular "wagon train" perimeter of the base were the headquarters and Batteries B and C, 2nd Battalion, 33rd Artillery Regiment under the command of Lieutenant Colonel Charles D. Daniel, as well as elements of the 168th Engineer Battalion. The engineers were engaged in building a Special Forces and Civilian Irregular Defense Group (CIDG) camp and airfield in the area.

Nui Ba Den had long been a stronghold for guerrilla fighters for over a century. During the 19th century, the area was a favored organizing area and hideout for rebel movements opposed to the ruling Nguyen dynasty of Vietnam. It was heavily used by religiously motivated peasant movements that were usually led by millenarian self-styled mystics. This continued into the 20th century as these new religious movements were often able to quickly gather supporters through claims of supernatural powers and promises to defeat French colonialists. The rugged terrain and dense foliage made the area ideal for guerillas and the communists had entrenched themselves there in recent times.

The 2nd Battalion's APCs were placed at 50-metre (55 yd) intervals around the base perimeter. The areas between the APCs were protected by foxholes manned by infantry, engineers, and artillerymen. Just after sunset, the troops on the perimeter fired their weapons to test their readiness and put on a show of force to any VC in the vicinity. Ambush patrols and listening posts left the perimeter of the base for their sentry positions in the surrounding jungle for the night. At about 20:30, men of a Company A listening post to the east of the perimeter, while moving into position, reported seeing and engaging three VC with unknown results. Collins placed the battalion on 75 percent alert and artillery harassing fires continued.

== Battle ==
At 22:00 the VC commenced a heavy mortar attack on the circle of American troops. Within two minutes, the Americans began to respond through heavy mortar platoons led by Sergeant First Class Kenneth D. Davis. In all, Davis and his men fired 435 rounds during the battle. In a period of half an hour, around 200 rounds of 120-mm, 82-mm, and 60-mm VC mortar fire exploded inside the base. The VC also employed 75-mm. Recoilless rifles and RPG-2 antitank weapons against the perimeter of the base. Several APCs were hit, 20 US troops were wounded and helicopters were brought in to evacuate the injured.

As soon as the mortar bombardment ended, Colonel Collins directed all his units to conduct a reconnaissance by fire of the area 200–600 meters beyond the perimeter. After the reconnaissance by fire ended, two VC battalions launched a ground attack from the east into the positions held by Company C at about 22:30. During the attack, Staff Sergeant Richard A. Griffin of Company A ran from his sheltered position to supply his comrades along the perimeter with ammunition. When the ground attack began, he returned to his machine gun and placed a heavy volume of accurate fire on the attackers. He was later awarded the Bronze Star with valor.

The Americans at the camp called the 3rd Brigade tactical command post at Suối Đá to request to provide close tactical air support, artillery, medical evacuation for the wounded and ammunition supply. Medical evacuation and supply were provided by five Hueys and a light fire team. The helicopters flew 64 sorties into Bases I and II. With their landing lights on, the aircraft brought in 16 tons of supplies. One hundred tactical air sorties supported the American ground forces.

The VC launched smaller attacks from the northeast and southeast with recoilless rifles and automatic weapons on the Company A positions. Three of Company A's APCs were hit by RPG-2 rounds and one APC received a direct hit from a mortar round. On the southwestern side of the American base, Company C received a VC attack head on. Moving parallel to the highway along the western side of the road, the VC ran across 500 meters of open ground towards Company C's positions from the southwest. Continuous fire from the Americans quickly overwhelmed the VC. The company never reported seeing more than a platoon of VC in the clearing, although many more VC fired from the woods.

When the mortar attack started, the artillery defensive concentrations which ringed the entire perimeter of the base were fired. As the VC attacks commenced, adjustments in the aim were made toward and onto the attacks. Nearby US artillery units at Bases I and III as well as at Prek Klok base, swept the area around the perimeter with over five thousand rounds, while the 3rd Brigade's forward air controllers directed the air strikes.

When the first US Air Force flight arrived in the area, Route 4 was declared a fire co-ordination line between the artillery and the aircraft. To the west of the road the artillery fired to stop the VC assault, while to the east American air power dropped bombs, rockets and fired 20-mm cannon. The massive and use of air strikes and artillery was the main reason for the eventual US victory.

After an hour, the main part of the VC attack had been repelled. Sniper fire continued as the VC withdrew and it was about 04:30 that the VC stopped firing.

== Aftermath ==
Early morning ground and aerial observation of the area disclosed 197 VC killed, while five wounded VC were taken prisoner, along with 12 weapons and some documents. The Americans lost 3 killed and 38 wounded. From the captured documents the attacking force was determined by the Americans to be two battalions of the 272nd Regiment of the VC 9th Division.
