= Long Nguyên =

Long Nguyên Phường Long Nguyên An Điền
- Ward
- Interactive map of Long Nguyên
- Coordinates: 11°12′44″N 106°33′02″E
- Country: Vietnam
- Municipality: Ho Chi Minh City
- Established: June 16, 2025

Area
  - Total: 41.70 sq mi (108.00 km^{2})

Population (2024)
  - Total: 53,387
  - Density: 1,280.3/sq mi (494.32/km^{2})
- Time zone: UTC+07:00 (Indochina Time)
- Administrative code: 25840

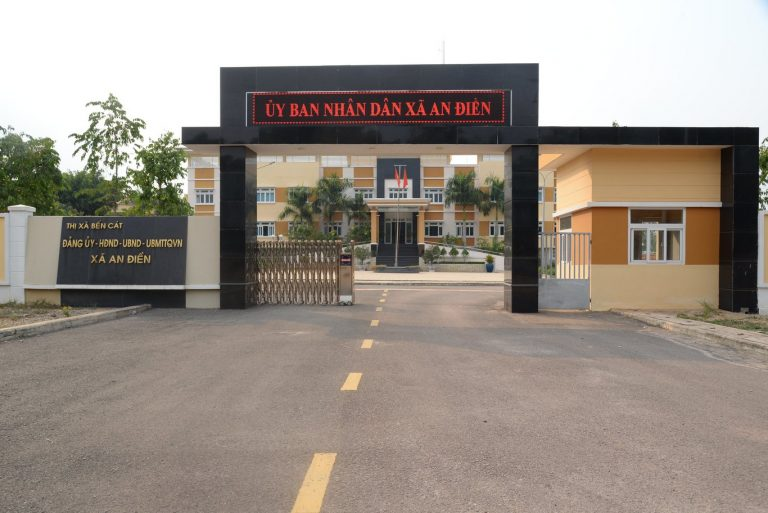
The People's Committee headquarters in An Điền, relevant to municipal reorganization areas like Long Nguyên in Ho Chi Minh City

Long Nguyên (Vietnamese: Phường Long Nguyên) is a ward of Ho Chi Minh City, Vietnam. It is one of the 168 new wards, communes and special zones of the city following the reorganization in 2025.

== History ==
On June 16, 2025, the National Assembly Standing Committee issued Resolution No. 1685/NQ-UBTVQH15 on the arrangement of commune-level administrative units of Ho Chi Minh City in 2025 (effective from June 16, 2025). Accordingly, the entire land area and population of An Điền ward and part of Mỹ Phước ward of the former Bến Cát city, the entire land area and population of Long Nguyên commune of the former Bàu Bàng district will be integrated into a new ward named Long Nguyên (Clause 94, Article 1).
