= Trừ Văn Thố, Ho Chi Minh City =

Trừ Văn Thố Xã Trừ Văn Thố Bàu Lòng, Cây Trường
- Commune
- Interactive map of Trừ Văn Thố
- Coordinates: 11°20′58″N 106°36′48″E
- Country: Vietnam
- Municipality: Ho Chi Minh City
- Established: June 16, 2025

Area
  - Total: 29.56 sq mi (76.56 km^{2})

Population (2024)
  - Total: 24,533
  - Density: 829.9/sq mi (320.4/km^{2})
- Time zone: UTC+07:00 (Indochina Time)
- Administrative code: 25819

Trừ Văn Thố (Vietnamese: Xã Trừ Văn Thố) is a commune of Ho Chi Minh City, Vietnam. It is one of the 168 new wards, communes and special zones of the city following the reorganization in 2025.

== History ==
On June 16, 2025, the National Assembly Standing Committee issued Resolution No. 1685/NQ-UBTVQH15 on the arrangement of commune-level administrative units of Ho Chi Minh City in 2025 (effective from June 16, 2025). Accordingly, the entire land area and population of Trừ Văn Thố, Cây Trường II communes and part of Lai Uyên township of the former Bàu Bàng district will be integrated into a new commune named Trừ Văn Thố (Clause 142, Article 1).
