= Cheshire Academy =

Coordinates: 41.50095°N 72.9009°W

Location
- 10 Main Street; Cheshire, Connecticut 06410; United States

Information
- School type: Private, college-preparatory boarding school
- Established: 1794 (232 years ago)
- CEEB code: 070095
- Headmaster: Tom Woelper
- Faculty: ~70
- Grades: 9-12, postgraduate
- Gender: Co-educational
- Enrollment: ~360
- Campus: Suburban
- Campus size: 104 acres
- Colors: Blue and white
- Mascot: The Cats
- Yearbook: The Rolling Stone
- Tuition: Boarding $66,225; International $76,225; Day $35,745
- Website: www.cheshireacademy.org

Cheshire Academy is a co-educational college preparatory school located in Cheshire, Connecticut, United States. Founded in 1794 as the Episcopal Academy of Connecticut, it is the eleventh oldest boarding school in the United States. In 1917, the school was renamed The Roxbury School, and trained young men exclusively for the purpose of attending nearby Yale University. Later known as Cheshire Academy, the school was the first private academic institution to accept international students dating back to the 1850s, and as of 2011 it is the only independent school to offer the International Baccalaureate Diploma Programme in the state of Connecticut.

The Academy enrolls about 360 students from approximately 31 countries and 19 states in grades 9 through 12 plus a postgraduate year.

== Campus ==
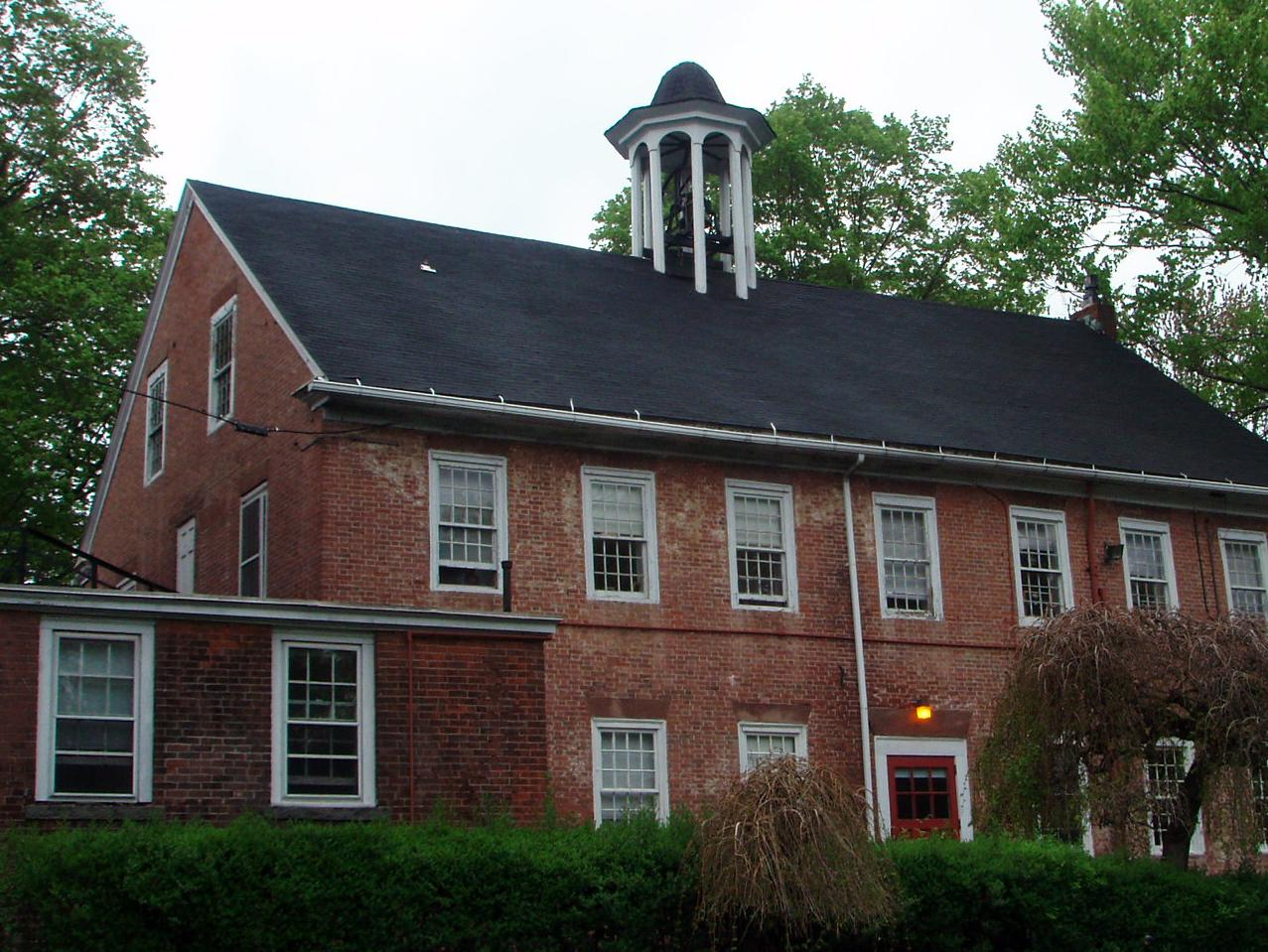
Bowden Hall, the oldest schoolhouse in continuous use in the state of Connecticut

The campus of 104 acres (0.42 km^{2}) is located in the center of the town of Cheshire. The campus includes five residential dormitories and facilities including the John J. White '38 Science & Technology Center and the Humanities Building. All areas of campus are equipped with wireless access and a fiber optic network with 30 Mb/s access to the internet. In the fall of 2011, Cheshire Academy saw the dedication of the new Simosa track and field. Over the summer before the 2022-2023 school year, Cheshire Academy constructed new tennis courts and playing fields on their campus. At the same time, Cheshire Academy had the Simosa track and field updated.

== History ==
The town of Cheshire, established in 1780, was originally known for its lighting industry, copper mining, and agricultural productivity. Samuel Seabury, the first Episcopal Bishop of Connecticut, established the Episcopal Academy in 1794, which would later endure several incarnations as The Cheshire School (in the early 1900s), The Roxbury School in 1917, and finally, Cheshire Academy in 1937.

Under the first headmaster, Rev. John Bowden, the school became renowned not only for training young men for the clergy, but also for educating students in the fields of English, Latin and Greek, philosophy, mathematics, and the sciences taught by leading colleges in the country at the time. Erected in 1796, Bowden Hall, the oldest schoolhouse still in continuous use in the state of Connecticut and tenth oldest schoolhouse in the United States, became an all-Cheshire community project, with funds to build the school donated by both churches and local proprietors.

In 1806, Dr. Tillotson Bronson was elected as headmaster. During his twenty-year term at the school, Bronson deemed that young women would be admitted to this once all-male institution, a rare allowance for women at the time. For this reason, many young women were sent to attend the school from distant townships in order to take advantage of such a unique educational opportunity.

Another liberal tenet of the school at this time, as drafted in the school's constitution, was that students were allowed the freedom to practice the religion of their family's choice, regardless of the school's Episcopal affiliation. As stated in the ninth article of the constitution of the Episcopal Academy, "No Bye Laws of the Academy shall compel the Students to attend Public worship, but at such place or places as their respective Parents or Guardians shall direct."

In 1917 the school was purchased by the Roxbury Training Center, and the institution was no longer open to both men and women. The Roxbury School operated with the sole purpose of training young men to enter Yale University. An existing military aspect of the school was abolished, and the school focused now on rigorous academic preparation.

Under long-standing headmaster Arthur Sheriff, the school became Cheshire Academy in 1937. It was not until 1969 that the school returned to its co-ed beginnings, allowing both young men and women to attend classes together.

== Accreditation and memberships ==
The school is accredited by the Connecticut Association of Independent Schools, New England Association of Schools and Colleges, and The Association of Boarding Schools. Additionally it holds memberships in the National Association of Independent Schools, the Secondary School Admission Test Board. and the IB Diploma Programme

== Notable alumni ==
- Abraham Attah (b. 2002), actor.
- Carl Barzilauskas (1951–2023), professional football player.
- Eric Bloom (b. 1944), musician, Blue Öyster Cult.
- Chester Bowles (b. 1901), 78th Connecticut governor, Ambassador to India.
- Peter M. Brant (b. 1947), CEO of White Birch Paper, 2007 Commencement speaker.
- Loring Buzzell (b. 1927), music publisher and record label executive.
- J. Kenneth Campbell (b. 1947) film, stage, and television actor cast in over 80 roles
- Alberto Díaz, Jr. (b. 1943), Rear Admiral, United States Navy.
- Geoffrey Cheney Ferris (1918–1943), Second Lieutenant, United States Army, awarded the Distinguished Service Cross during World War II.
- Alexis Holmes (b. 2000), sprinter
- Andrew Hull Foote (1806–1863), Civil War Admiral in the United States Navy.
- Fred Friendly (1915–1998), President of CBS News.
- Francisco Garcia (b. 1981), 2005 NBA top 25 draft pick; last played for Indios de San Francisco of the Liga Nacional de Baloncesto.
- Clay Fuller (b. 1981), U.S. Representative from Georgia.
- Roberto Goizueta (1931–1997), former CEO of the Coca-Cola Company.
- Ricardo Greer (b. 1977), basketball player
- Joseph W. Hasel, "Voice of the New York Giants".
- Mike Heller (b. 1982), musician, Fear Factory.
- Lambert Hitchcock (1795–1852), furniture maker.
- Robert A. Hurley (1895–1968), governor of Connecticut.
- Josh Jobe (b. 1998), professional football player, Seattle Seahawks.
- John Frederick Kensett (1816–1872), artist.
- Rockwell Kent (1882–1971), artist.
- Mark Kurlansky (b. 1948), author.
- Talib Kweli (b. 1975), rapper.
- Norm Larsen (1923–1970), inventor of WD-40.
- Robert Ludlum (1927–2001), author, The Bourne Identity.
- Charles Le Moyne Mitchell (1844–1890) U.S. Representative from Connecticut.
- J. P. Morgan (1837–1913), industrialist and financier.
- Eli Pemberton (b. 1997), basketball player in the Israeli Basketball Premier League
- Pete Perreault (1939–2001), NFL lineman.
- Luke Reynolds (2024), college football tight end.
- Henry Shelton Sanford (1823–1891), US Ambassador to Belgium and the founder of Sanford, Florida.
- Frank Shields (1909–1975), Tennis Hall of Fame, Wimbledon.
- Lenny Simpson (1948–2024), Detroit Loves, WTT, Professional Tennis Player, first African-American to play for the World Team Tennis
- James Van Der Beek (1977–2026), actor, Dawson's Creek.
- Gideon Welles (1802–1878), United States Secretary of the Navy from 1861 to 1869, after whom the school's dining hall is named.
- 'Fighting Joe' Wheeler (1836–1906), Confederate General.
- Sidney Wood (1911–2009), Tennis Hall of Fame, Wimbledon.
- Andre Carter II (b. 2000), NFL defensive end
