= George Shuffer =

United States Army general (1923–2005)

- Born: September 27, 1923; Palestine, Texas
- Died: February 5, 2005 (aged 81)
- Military career
- Allegiance: United States of America
- Branch: United States Army
- Service years: 1940–1975
- Rank: Brigadier General
- Commands: 193rd Infantry Brigade
- Conflicts: World War II; Korean War; Vietnam War: Battle of Ap Bau Bang
- Awards: Distinguished Service Medal; Silver Star (3); Bronze Star (4); Purple Heart; Air Medal (5)

George Macon Shuffer (September 27, 1923 – February 5, 2005) was a United States Army brigadier general.

== Early life ==
Shuffer was born and grew up in Palestine, Texas to a family of tenant farmers. Shuffer was awarded academic scholarships to LeMoyne College and Lincoln University in Pennsylvania, but enlisted in the United States Army after graduating from high school to support his family, joining his two older brothers.

== Military career ==
Shuffer arrived at Fort Huachuca, where his brothers were stationed as members of the 25th Infantry Regiment, in June 1940. The quota for the regiment was full and he did not formally enlist until August. He was transferred to Camp Wolters in Texas and reached the rank of Sergeant before entering Officer Candidate School. Upon commissioning, Shuffer was assigned to the 368th Infantry Regiment and deployed to the Pacific in 1944.

Shuffer remained in the Army after the war. He served in the Korean War, commanding Company F of the 24th Infantry Regiment. Shuffer was seriously wounded in April 1951 and was evacuated to Walter Reed Army Medical Center.

Shuffer commanded 2nd Battalion, 2nd Infantry Regiment and deployed to Vietnam in October 1965. He commanded the unit during the Battle of Ap Bau Bang. Shuffer was deployed to Vietnam a second time as part of the staff for II Field Force, Vietnam. He was assigned to command the 193rd Infantry Brigade in the Panama Canal Zone in 1970.

In 1972, Shuffer was promoted to the rank of Brigadier General. Shuffer medically retired from the Army on June 30, 1975, and was awarded the Distinguished Service Medal on November 5, 1975.
