= Bàu Bàng =

Bàu Bàng Xã Bàu Bàng Lai Uyên
- Commune
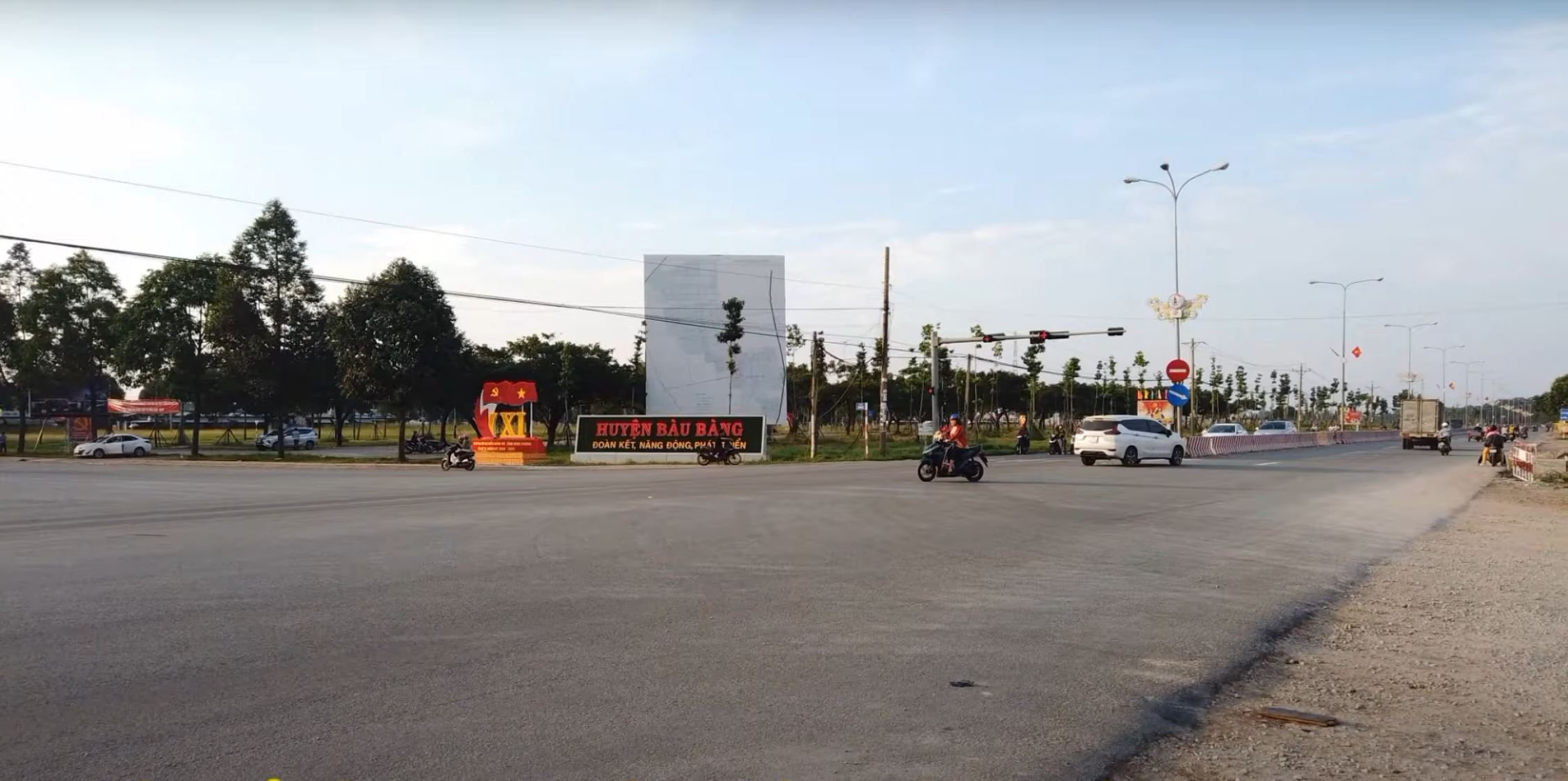
- National Route 13, passing through the center of Bàu Bàng
- Interactive map of Bàu Bàng
- Coordinates: 11°17′07″N 106°36′42″E
- Country: Vietnam
- Municipality: Ho Chi Minh City
- Established: June 16, 2025

Area
  - Total: 32.47 sq mi (84.09 km^{2})

Population (2024)
  - Total: 42,219
  - Density: 1,300/sq mi (502.1/km^{2})
- Time zone: UTC+07:00 (Indochina Time)
- Administrative code: 25822

Bàu Bàng (Vietnamese: Xã Bàu Bàng) is a commune of Ho Chi Minh City, Vietnam. It is one of the 168 new wards, communes and special zones of the city following the reorganization in 2025.

== Geography ==
According to Official Dispatch No. 2896/BNV-CQĐP dated May 27, 2025 of the Ministry of Home Affairs, following the merger, Bàu Bàng has a land area of 84.09 km², the population as of December 31, 2024 is 42,219 people, the population density is 502 people/km².

== History ==
On June 16, 2025, the National Assembly Standing Committee issued Resolution No. 1685/NQ-UBTVQH15 on the arrangement of commune-level administrative units of Ho Chi Minh City in 2025 (effective from June 16, 2025). Accordingly, the majority of land area and population of Lai Uyên township of the former Bàu Bàng district will be integrated into a new commune named Bàu Bàng (Clause 143, Article 1).
