= Battle of Ap Gu =

1967 battle of the Vietnam War

- Part of Operation Junction City, Vietnam War
Date	31 March – 1 April 1967
Location	Ap Gu, Tay Ninh Province, South Vietnam
Result	American victory

Belligerents
United States	Viet Cong

Commanders and leaders
Col. Rufus C. Lazzell; Lt. Col. Alexander M. Haig	

Units involved
1st Battalion, 16th Infantry Regiment; 1st Battalion, 26th Infantry Regiment	271st Regiment

Strength
	~900

Casualties and losses
17 killed	(Viet Cong) 609 killed and 50 weapons recovered

The Battle of Ap Gu occurred during 31 March and 1 April 1967 during Operation Junction City, a search and destroy mission by American military forces in Tay Ninh Province of South Vietnam, to the west of the capital Saigon. The battle near the border with Cambodia left 609 Viet Cong (VC) killed according to US sources, with 5 captured, and over 50 weapons of all types recovered, while the Americans lost 17 killed and 102 wounded.

Two American infantry battalions were scheduled to make an airborne assault into an area near the border with Cambodia to secure some roads and US bases, and to search and destroy VC in the surrounding area. The assault was scheduled for 30 March, but poor weather meant that one of the battalions did not land until the day after. In the early afternoon of 31 March, the Americans began reconnaissance missions, and one platoon was put into difficulty by a VC attack that killed their commanding officer. A few hours later, an American company was attacked by a battalion-sized VC force, and were in difficulty until supporting artillery allowed them to withdraw. The communists tried to exploit their advantage but were driven off by American firepower.

Before dawn the next day, the VC launched their main attacks on an American landing zone and fire support base with mortar-fire and infantry charged. They managed to overrun a few bunkers and capture 0.4 ha of territory before the Americans called in air strikes and cluster bombs. This wore down the VC and they were forced to withdraw by early morning with heavy casualties.

== Background ==
On 26 March the 1st Battalion, 26th Infantry Regiment commanded by Lieutenant Colonel Alexander M. Haig, was told to prepare for an airborne assault deeper into War Zone C and nearer to the Cambodian border. At that time, the Battalion was attached to the 2nd Brigade of the 1st Infantry Division and was located at Fire Support Patrol Base C at Sroc Con Trang (11.654°N 106.423°E), where they were engaged in perimeter defense, road security, and occasional search and destroy operations. The plan was to make the landing on the morning of 30 March into what would be Landing Zone (LZ) George (11.621°N 106.306°E), some 14 km (9 mi) to the west. They would secure the zone for a follow-up landing by the 1st Battalion, 2nd Infantry Regiment, and then conduct operations together in an area where VC were expected to be positioned.

On the scheduled day of the assault, poor weather delayed the preparatory air strikes around and on the LZ, resulting in a two-hour delay. Thus, the assault of the 1/2nd Infantry was postponed until 31 March, and the 1/26th Infantry landed in the afternoon of 30 March at LZ George. The LZ consisted of open fields covered with tall, meadow-like grass and the area was surrounded by medium to heavy jungle. The remainder of the battalion landed within an hour. Upon landing the battalion dispatched cloverleaf patrols to try to intercept the VC. The patrols uncovered fortified positions in and around the LZ but made no contact. That evening the unit organized its night defensive position in the vicinity of the LZ. Fighting positions were dug with full overhead cover and interlocking fires all around, as was the standard practice. Listening posts were established and ambush patrols sent out. No significant contact with the VC occurred overnight.

The next morning, 31 March, the 1/2nd Infantry led by Lieutenant Colonel William C. Simpson landed at LZ George without incident. After this, they moved to 2 km (1 mi) southwest. The 1/26th Infantry began search and destroy operations in the surrounding area. Company A went south and C Company east. B Company remained in reserve, manning and patrolling the battalion perimeter at the LZ. The battalion's reconnaissance platoon was searching the woods northwest of the perimeter. The VC were expecting the Americans and had hung small signs written in English on the trees, warning that Americans who went beyond the signs would not return.

== Battle ==
At 13:00 the reconnaissance platoon moved further north into a wooded area, approximately 5 km (3 mi) south of the Cambodian border. There, first contact was made. The platoon's point man was hit by enemy fire, and First Lieutenant Richard A. Hill went forward to check the situation, only to be mortally wounded. Only Hill's radio operator was left in contact with the battalion headquarters. Hill had advised the battalion that his platoon was heavily engaged with automatic weapons, small arms, and grenades. Haig called for artillery support and after being advised that Hill was incapacitated, took action to co-ordinate the artillery fire and air strikes in support of the platoon.

At the same time, B Company was closing on the perimeter after a sweep of the battalion's defensive zone. When advised of the reconnaissance platoon's desperate position and that Hill had been hit, the commander of B Company took his men to the north to the assistance of the embattled platoon without the knowledge of Haig.

Colonel Haig boarded his helicopter, and it was not until he was airborne that he learned of B Company's move. As Haig pointed out later, while Company B's move was necessary, the lack of accurate control of artillery and air support complicated the problem. As a result, B Company had entered the battle without sufficient preparation and found itself heavily engaged along with the reconnaissance platoon.

The B Company commander reported that he was confronting a VC force of at least battalion-size, and his optimism gradually faded; his men were pinned down by heavy machine gun fire, rockets, mortars, and recoilless rifles, and was running low on ammunition. Haig realized that reinforcements and relief was necessary. Company A was alerted and ordered to move forward to relieve B Company.

Haig landed near the battle and had his battalion operations officer take to the air to control fire direction. Haig found Hill's body and the B Company commander wounded. Haig stayed and was joined by the A Company commander, who had moved his unit through and gained fire superiority over the enemy force.

The American artillery and air strikes increased, permitting all units, except initially two platoons of Company A still in contact, to be withdrawn under fire cover. As the Americans moved back, the VC left their bunkers and moved forward to try to keep the pressure on the Americans, but they were forced to stop because of the American bombardment, and the fighting stopped at 17:05. Seven Americans were killed and 38 wounded in the initial skirmish, while the VC casualties were unknown at that time.

Meanwhile, the division commander, General John H. Hay, had ordered reinforcements. At 15:55 the first element of the 1st Battalion, 16th Infantry Regiment, except C Company, touched down at LZ George under VC sniper fire and occupied positions to the west and northwest of the 1/26th Infantry. The Battalion, led by Colonel Rufus C. Lazzell, established night defensive positions. The two Battalions co-ordinated defensive plans to improve their fighting positions, established listening posts, and sent out ambush patrols.

During the night, American harassment and interdiction artillery and mortar fires were placed in the area around the perimeter. From midnight until 04:00 on 1 April, listening posts to the north, east, and south reported movement to their front; however, their contact was insignificant contact. Mortar fire was directed into areas of suspected VC activity.

At 04:55 a single VC mortar round exploded to the front of the perimeter of the 1/26th Infantry. Haig heard and correctly interpreted it to be a registration round for a mortar attack. He immediately ordered all of his companies to be on full alert posture and directed them to take cover and be prepared for an attack. He also recommended that the 1/16th Infantry do the same, and Lazzell's unit complied.

Haig immediately requested Capt. Dave Ernest lay down artillery cover fire. Five minutes after the VC registration round landed, the first of several hundred rounds of 60-mm., 82-mm., and 120-mm. mortar fire were directed into the northern portions of the American perimeter. The Americans estimated the source of fire to be 1 km (1 mi) northeast of the defensive perimeter. They could hear the rounds being fired and concluded that the VC were nearby, and that so many mortars were firing that they "sounded like loud, heavy machine guns." Due to the early warning and thus the rapid response, only 12 men were wounded.

At the same time the mortar attack opened on the units in LZ George, a coordinated attack was launched against Fire Support Patrol Base C, where much of the artillery for the 1/26th Infantry and the 1/16th Infantry was dug in. The incoming mortar and 75-mm. pack howitzer rounds hit the artillery base and made it more inefficient. However, the artillery that had moved into Fire Support Patrol Base Thrust (11.578°N 106.370°E), on 29 March was not under incoming mortar attack and could provide support unhindered. The Americans were surprised that the VC did not attack this base to try to hinder their artillery fire.

Haig felt that the VC had wanted to press on after the previous day's attack, and that he would have taken the initiative if his opponents had not. The heavy mortar attack ended at 05:15, but continued for a further hour at Fire Support Patrol Base C. During this time flareships, a light helicopter fire team, and forward air controllers were furnished by the 2nd Brigade tactical headquarters on request. Seven minutes later the VC started their ground attack against the northeast edge of the perimeter.

The attack mainly hit Companies B and C, 1/26th Infantry and Company A and the reconnaissance platoon of the 1/16th Infantry. As the soldiers manning the friendly listening posts withdrew to the perimeter, the VC followed them in. The withdrawing Americans had accidentally set off flares, allowing the VC to see them and open fire with small arms and machine guns, backed by mortars.

The surprise attack caught the Americans off guard and resulted in the capture of three bunkers and the capture of territory roughly 40 m by 100 m wide in the Company C sector and close-quarters hand-to-hand fighting occurred. Haig later admitted that the night defensive position he selected, with a natural wood line leading into the northeast portion of the perimeter made this the most vulnerable portion of his perimeter, and that the VC were clever in attacking at this point. The Americans had to fall back 75 m to consolidate.

The commander of Company C, Captain Brian H. Cundiff, defying the intense fire, moved among his men and organized an effective response to the VC penetration. At 06:30 the reserve of the 1/26th Infantry, the reconnaissance platoon, moved into a blocking position behind C Company and, along with B Company, fought to re-establish the original perimeter. Meanwhile, the VC launched diversionary attacks from the east and west. By this time, flights for air strikes were coming over the target area four times an hour, providing continuous air cover.

Initially, there was some difficulty in getting the flights loaded with cluster bombs; these were seen as essential and the most effective ordnance for the situation, as the VC were in the open, in close range to the Americans, and as the pilot can release the cluster bombs from a low level within 30 m of the Americans without harming them.

The main VC attack was beginning to be worn down by the American firepower. Light and heavy helicopter fire teams were aiming rockets and miniguns on the wood line to the northeast; artillery was massing along the east flank and in depth to the east. As the flights arrived with cluster bombs and attacked within thirty meters of the American positions, large groups of VC bodies formed. As the ordnance began taking its toll, the VC started to run, many throwing down their weapons.

In the meantime, Captain Cundiff led elements of Company C, reinforced by the 1st Platoon of Company B, in a counter-attack that pushed the remaining VC back into the American artillery barrages and air strikes and by 08:00 the perimeter was restored.

As the VC began withdrawing, the 1/2nd Infantry and the 1/16th Infantry passed through the 1/26th Infantry to pursue the VC to the east and northeast. However, they could not make substantial contact. Artillery and air strikes were ordered on suspected withdrawal routes and camps.

== Aftermath ==
After the battle was over, the Americans claimed to have found 491 VC bodies in their base area, but concluded that there were many more deaths. The Americans concluded that they had confronted three battalions of the 271st Regiment of the 9th Division and elements of the 70th Guard Regiment, and that they had claimed to have killed 609 and captured 5, and recovered over 50 weapons of all types in total. The Americans reported 17 killed and 102 wounded.

During the mortar attack on Fire Support Patrol Base C, where the 2nd Brigade command post was located, Colonel Grimsley was wounded and evacuated, and General James F. Hollingsworth took command. Later that day, Colonel Haig took over.

During the battle, artillery from Alpha Battery, 1st Battalion, 7th Artillery Regiment, under Captain David Ernest, had fired around 15,000 rounds, while United States Air Force jet fighter-bombers recorded 103 sorties amounting to over 100 tons of ordnance dropped.

Haig felt that the air power, particularly cluster bombs, were the main factor in the US success, although he also acknowledged the artillery and mortar in grinding down the VC. However, he also claimed that without all of the components used in the American effort, it would have failed.

Haig claimed that Ap Gu and Operation Attleboro showed the VC were tactically and strategically naive and inflexible at large-unit open combat.
