= Battle of Ap Bau Bang =

1965 battle of the Vietnam War

- Part of the Vietnam War
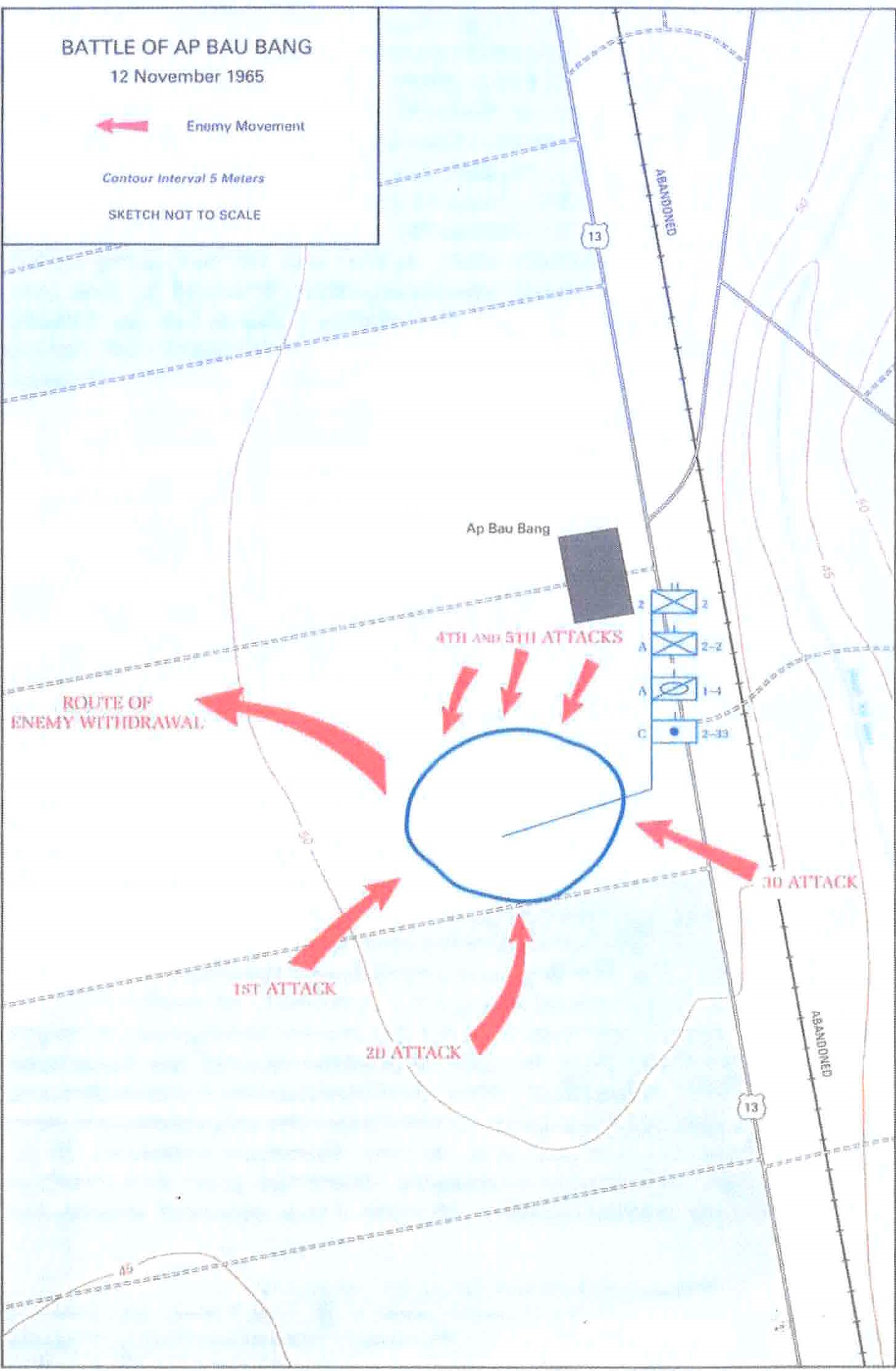
- Battle of Ap Bau Bang, 12 November 1965
Date	12 November 1965
Location	Bau Bang, Bình Dương Province, South Vietnam 11.195°N 106.617°E
Result	See Aftermath

Belligerents
United States	Viet Cong

Commanders and leaders
Lt. Col. George Shuffer	Senior Col. Hoàng Cầm

Units involved
2nd Battalion, 2nd Infantry Regiment; Troop A 1st Squadron, 4th Cavalry Regiment; Battery C, 2nd Battalion, 33rd Artillery Regiment	272nd Regiment; 273rd Regiment

Casualties and losses
20 killed VC claim: 2,000 killed or wounded 39 tanks and 8 artillery pieces destroyed	U.S. body count: 146 killed 50 presumed killed VC claim: 109 killed

The Battle of Ap Bau Bang (Vietnamese: trận Bàu Bàng) took place on the morning of 12 November 1965 when two regiments from the Viet Cong (VC) 9th Division attacked a night defensive position of the United States 2nd Battalion, 2nd Infantry Regiment (2/2nd Infantry) at a small village (ấp) of Bàu Bàng, in today's Bàu Bàng district, 25 km north of Thủ Dầu Một.

== Background ==
On 4 November the commander of the Army of the Republic of Vietnam (ARVN) 5th Division Major general Phạm Quốc Thuần requested the 1st Infantry Division to secure Highway 13 north of Lai Khê to cover the movement of the ARVN 7th Regiment, 5th Division for an operation in the Michelin Rubber Plantation.

1st Infantry Division commander Major general Seaman ordered Colonel William Brodbeck's 3rd Brigade, 1st Infantry Division to undertake this mission. The mission in turn was given to Lieutenant colonel George Shuffer and his 2/2nd Infantry. Shuffer established a Task Force consisting of his unit plus Troop A, 1st Squadron, 4th Cavalry Regiment and Battery C, 2nd Battalion, 33rd Artillery Regiment. Shuffer divided Highway 13 into 3 sectors each secured by a company and with the command group, cavalry and artillery in the middle sector. Each day patrols would be sent out to sweep the Highway and its surroundings and they would withdraw into night defensive positions.

The commander of the VC 9th Division, Senior Colonel Hoàng Cầm decided to attack the American forces, gathering his units on the afternoon of 11 November. The main target would be the central American unit located just south of the village of Bau Bang, with the main assault by the 272nd Regiment supported by mortars and recoilless rifles and elements of the 271st Regiment. While the 273rd Regiment would attack from the south and block Highway 13 to the south preventing any reinforcement, while the 7th Battalion would be held in reserve.

== Battle ==
On the night of 11 November two mortar rounds hit Shuffer's central position and a night ambush killed two VC. During this time the VC completed their preparations for their attack, placing heavy weapons in and around the village as well as laying wires for field telephones around the American positions.

At 06:05 on 12 November, as Shuffer's forces prepared to start patrolling Highway 13, the VC launched their attack. Starting with a barrage of 50 mortar rounds, a battalion of VC attacked from the southwest. The attack was quickly met by return fire from Troop A's M113s which broke up the attack. A second attack from the south and a third attack from the southeast were similarly beaten back by the waiting American force.

At 07:00 what might have been the VC main attack was launched from the village of Bau Bang to the north. Initially penetrating the American position, this attack was also repulsed. Battery C used its guns in anti-personnel mode firing 55 rounds at ground level with two second fuses. Air strikes by United States Air Force A-1Hs and United States Navy A-4s were directed against the VC mortars and recoilless rifles positioned in and around Bau Bang.

At 09:00 the VC launched a final assault from the north, but were met with concentrated artillery fire and air strikes. By 13:30 the VC had abandoned their attacks and withdrawn.

== Aftermath ==
Total U.S. casualties were 20 killed and 103 wounded, while VC losses were 146 killed (body count) and a further 50 were believed to have been killed, but the bodies were removed. The 2/2nd Infantry and attached units received a Valorous Unit Award for this action.

Vietnamese sources only acknowledged 109 killed and over 200 wounded for the VC and claimed to have killed or wounded 2,000 Americans and destroyed 39 tanks and eight heavy artillery pieces.
