= Battle of Prek Klok I =

1967 battle in the Vietnam War

- Part of Operation Junction City, Vietnam War
Date	February 28, 1967
Location	Prek Klok, Tay Ninh Province, South Vietnam 11°29′N 106°12′E
Result	U.S. victory

Belligerents
United States	Viet Cong

Commanders and leaders
Lt. Col. Rufus C. Lazzell	

Units involved
1st Battalion, 16th Infantry Regiment	2nd Battalion, 101st Regiment

Casualties and losses
25 killed	US body count: 167 killed 40 weapons recovered

The Battle of Prek Klok I occurred on February 28, 1967 during Operation Junction City, a search and destroy mission by American military forces in Tay Ninh Province of South Vietnam, to the west of the capital Saigon. A few days before the battle, the 1st Battalion, 16th Infantry Regiment was brought into the area near Suối Đá and Prek Klok to defend a highway, airfield, and artillery base in the area, and to carry out search and destroy operations around it. On the morning of 28 February, elements of the battalion headed east, and were attacked from the front by Viet Cong (VC) infantry with gunfire, rockets and mortars. Soon after, they were attacked from all fronts as the VC tried to surround them with a battalion-sized force. However, with superior firepower available, the Americans called in air strikes and artillery, and by mid afternoon, had repelled the VC attacks. The Americans lost 25 killed while the VC lost 167.

== Background ==
The 1/16th Infantry, was brought into Operation Junction City on February 23 when it was airlifted from its base at Lai Khe, southwest to Suối Đá. There it assumed the mission that had belonged to the 2nd Battalion, 28th Infantry Regiment, of being the reserve for the 3rd Brigade; it also was assigned its portion of the Suối Đá defenses. In the early morning of February 24 the battalion area received approximately 120 rounds of 82-mm. mortar, all within a few minutes; two were killed, including a company commander, and five wounded. Six hours later the battalion was airlifted to positions along Route 4 north of Suối Đá and, after considerable jungle clearing, went into a night defensive position on the east side of the road, six kilometers south of Prek Klok, the location of an artillery base defended by the 2nd Battalion, 2nd Infantry Regiment, where an airfield and a Special Forces camp were being built. The mission of the battalion was to secure the road in its assigned sector and to engage in search and destroy operations.

The 1/16th Infantry was commanded by Lieutenant Colonel Rufus C. Lazzell. He had commanded the battalion in mid-1966 for about a month before he was wounded in July by a bullet wound to the elbow, which required him to be evacuated to the US; upon his return to Vietnam in November 1966, General William DePuy restored him to command of his old unit.

On 25 February, the battalion suffered several friendly fire incidents. One of the unit's 81-mm. mortar rounds fell short of their intended target and landed near soldiers of the unit, injuring two. Later in the day, their position was hit by .50-caliber machine gun rounds from an Allied mechanized unit conducting reconnaissance by fire during the period immediately after sunset, luckily the only damage was to an 81-mm. mortar. The next two days were rather uneventful.

== Battle ==
At 08:00 on 28 February, Company B, 1/16th Infantry, departed its overnight defensive position located along Route 4 and moved east on a search and destroy mission. Two and a half kilometers ahead was the Prek Klok stream, a destination they would never reach. Commanded by Captain Donald S. Ulm, Company B made very slow progress through the thick and tangled jungle in two columns with the 3rd Platoon in the lead, followed by the 2nd and 1st Platoons. Ulm's command element was located between the 2nd and 1st Platoons. As the company progressed, the jungle thinned somewhat and the primary obstacle to the Americans became the fallen trees and brush-deadfall-which was encountered at 50- to 75-meter intervals. The company employed patrols in a cloverleaf pattern as they advanced. Two of these patterns had been completed by the time Company B progressed a little over one kilometer from its starting point.

At 10:30 the lead element of the 3rd Platoon received small arms and automatic weapons fire from a frontal direction, which was initially thought to be a company-size unit, but when Ulm learned that three machine guns had been observed, he correctly concluded that the VC were considerably more numerous. The VC were well concealed, but not dug in and thus not fully prepared for the ensuing battle. The 3rd Platoon, still in the lead, continued to receive heavy fire and was unable to gain the upper hand. Then the platoon reported being attacked on its right (south) flank as well as from the front (east).

In accordance with division policy, artillery marching fire had been preceding the company as it moved east; it was being fired by the 105 mm guns of the 2nd Battalion, 33rd Artillery Regiment, located at Artillery Base II at Prek Klok. As soon as contact was made the artillery forward observer ordered the shells to be trained on the VC position. Within minutes one of the command and control Huey helicopters of the division was flying above the battle scene and in touch with both the division tactical operations center and, in the absence of the brigade and battalion commanders, the company on the ground. The tactical operations center was alerted to get a forward air controller airborne over the area and to be prepared to get air strikes into the area once every fifteen minutes. Since the enemy was not dug in, the ordnance requested was cluster bombs, delivered almost at treetop level with a bursting radius of 30 meters. They could be delivered very close to friendly units and were highly lethal against troops in the open, even in the jungle.

Captain Ulm was asked to mark the position of his troops on the ground with colored smoke and to give the disposition of his company with respect to the smoke. It was quickly apparent to the airborne observer that the artillery (now supported by a battery of 155-mm. howitzers at Artillery Base I) had to be shifted if it were to be effective, and this was done so.

Twenty minutes after the start of the battle, the VC attacked from the northeast, and contact was lost between the 3rd Platoon and the company command. Captain Ulm theorized that the 3rd Platoon and possibly the 2nd Platoon would be flanked from the direction of the renewed attack and directed the 1st Platoon to move to the left flank of the 3rd Platoon. As the men moved into position the entire company area was hit by small arms fire, rifle grenades, rockets, and 60-mm. mortar rounds. The firing was intense, but it resulted in few friendly casualties. The 2nd Platoon moved to the right.

At 12:30 radio contact was re-established with the 3rd Platoon. Captain Ulm learned that the company was in an arc-shaped formation with the 3rd Platoon in the center, 2nd on the right, and 1st on the left (north). From this information the airborne observer was better able to picture the situation on the ground and adjust the artillery and air strikes accordingly. As each flight arrived over the target and its ordnance was determined, Captain Ulm was asked to name the desired location. Each time, a colored smoke grenade was thrown by the unit on the ground, and the strike was brought in with relation to the smoke as desired. Ulm noted that much of the automatic weapons and small arms fire came from the trees and that it was extremely accurate, so he ordered his company to concentrate on the well-camouflaged and concealed snipers in the trees.

At approximately 13:00 the 2nd Platoon detected movement to the west, and it appeared that the VC were attempting to encircle the American company and attack the open (west) end of the perimeter. To counter this, a fire team from the 1st Platoon was moved to the northwest and a squad from the 2nd Platoon was moved to the southwest. As the squad from the 2nd Platoon moved into position, it received heavy automatic weapons fire from the trees. They returned fire and called in artillery on the western side of the company.

Air strikes continued to be directed by the commander on the ground. Air strikes and artillery were being called in within 30 meters of the American positions in order to hit the VC in close proximity. By 14:00 the battle had subsided into sniper fire, and by 15:00 it had ended, mainly due to the 54 sorties of the Tactical Air Command and intensive artillery fire.

In the meantime Colonel Marks, the brigade commander, at 14:30 brought another company of the 1st Battalion into a landing zone some 600 meters to the northeast of the point of contact following the firing of preparatory fires around the zone. Upon landing one soldier was wounded by small arms fire. A second company from another battalion nearby was lifted into the landing zone immediately after the first had secured it; this second company was dispatched to assist Captain Ulm's men. By 16:45 a third company of the 1st Battalion, had landed to assist in securing the landing zone and in evacuating the dead and wounded there.

At 21:30 Captain Ulm and his company, assisted by the relieving company, reached the landing zone with their 25 dead and 28 wounded. Two sweeps of the area by the relieving company that evening and the following morning revealed 167 VC dead and 40 weapons captured or destroyed. One of the prisoners captured in the area the morning after was the assistant commander of a company in the 2nd Battalion, 101st Regiment of the VC 9th Division. It was this battalion that had encountered Company B. It appeared that they had been heading towards Route 4 to attack the U.S. convoys traveling between Suối Đá and Katum Camp. The next morning Company B was evacuated by helicopter to Suối Đá to be refitted and receive replacements. They were again in battle five days later.

== Aftermath ==
As a result of the battle, Platoon Sergeant Matthew Leonard was posthumously awarded the Medal of Honor. After his platoon leader had been wounded at the start of the battle, Leonard organized the platoon defensive position, redistributed ammunition, and took control. While helping a wounded soldier to safety, he was hit in the hand by a sniper, but continued to fight instead of stopping to receive medical attention. Under cover of the main attack from the northeast, the communists moved a machine gun into a location where it could sweep the entire position of Leonard's platoon. Leonard charged the gun, and destroyed its crew despite being hit several times by enemy fire. He was eventually killed in this act.
