= Herbert Ohly =

Herbert Ohly (18 December 1901, in Langenaltheim – 20 January 1972, in Gauting) was a German jurist. He served as the mayor of Erlangen after World War II.

== Life and career ==
Ohly was going to university in Halle, Jena and Würzburg. After finishing his law studies with the conferral of his doctorate in 1925, he became a lawyer but quickly transitioned to the Bavarian justice department. After he was elected city councilor of Erlangen in 1930, he joined the NSDAP in April 1933. Ohly was elected mayor two years later.

As World War II came to an end, Ohly convinced the Oberstleutnant Werner Lorleberg to hand over the town leadership to the Allies. He was displaced by Anton Hammerbacher in 1945.
