= Operation Junction City =

1967 battle of the Vietnam War

- Part of the Vietnam War
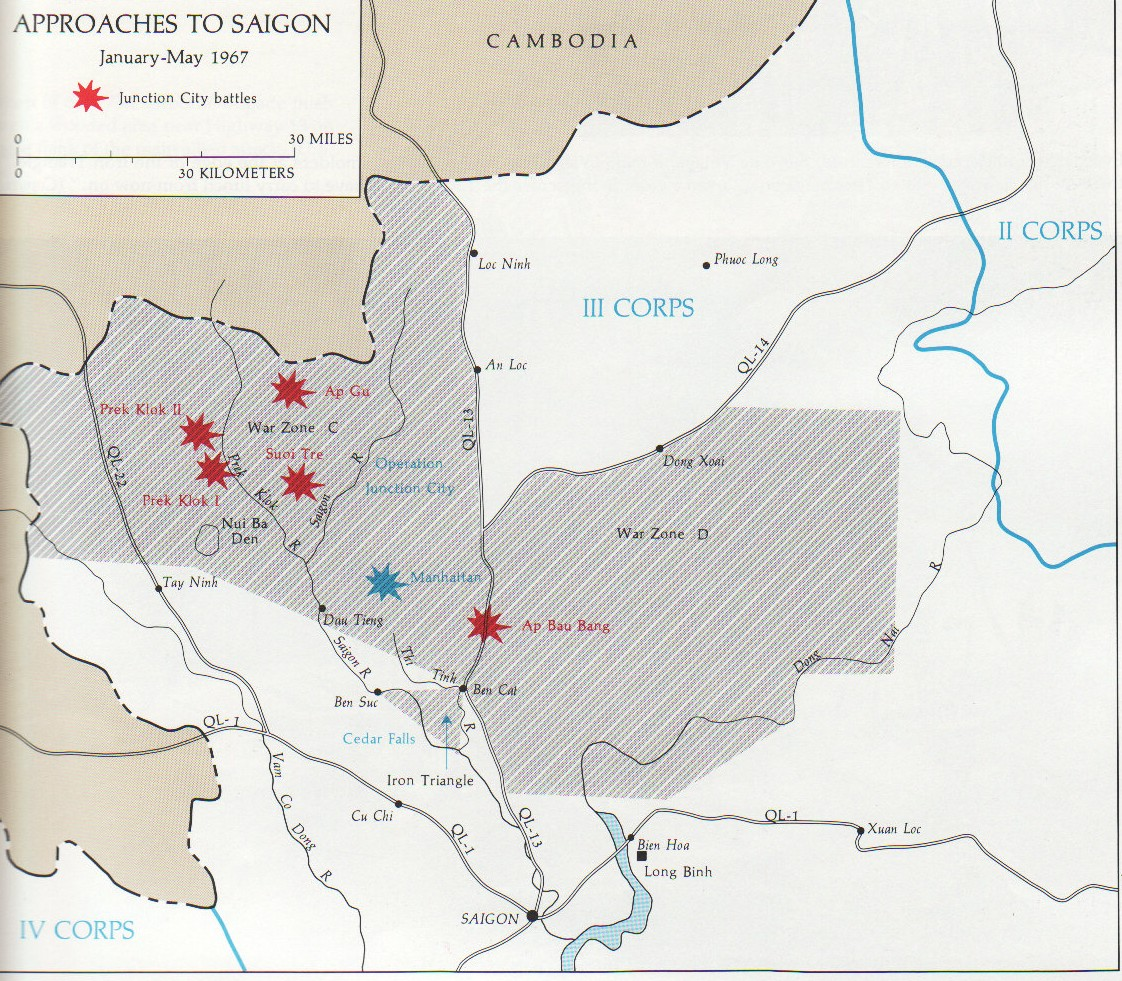
- Cedar Falls/Junction City area of operations
Date	22 February – 14 May 1967 (2 months, 3 weeks and 1 day)
Location	War Zone C, Tây Ninh Province, South Vietnam
Result	Inconclusive

Belligerents
United States	Viet Cong; North Vietnam

Commanders and leaders
Jonathan Seaman; Bruce Palmer Jr.	Lê Trọng Tấn (military); Trần Độ (political); Hoàng Cầm

Units involved
1st Infantry Division; 25th Infantry Division; 11th Armored Cavalry Regiment; 1st Brigade, 9th Infantry Division; 173rd Airborne Brigade; 3rd Brigade, 4th Infantry Division	9th Infantry Division: 271st Regiment; 272nd Regiment; 273rd Regiment; 70th Guard Regiment; 101st Infantry Regiment

Strength
30,000	~15,000

Casualties and losses
US report: 282 killed 1,576 wounded 24 tanks and armored vehicles destroyed 12 trucks destroyed 4 helicopters destroyed 5 howitzers destroyed PAVN claim: 13,500 killed or wounded 800 armored vehicles and trucks destroyed or damaged 119 howitzers and mortars destroyed or damaged	US claim: 2,728 killed 34 captured 139 deserters 491 individual and 100 crew-served weapons recovered PAVN report: 255 killed out of 1,275 total casualties

Operation Junction City was an 82-day military operation conducted by United States (US) and South Vietnam forces against Viet Cong (VC) forces begun on 22 February 1967 during the Vietnam War. It was the first US combat airborne operation since the Korean War and one of the largest airmobile operations of the war.

== Background ==
The stated aim of the almost three-month operation involving the equivalent of nearly three divisions of US troops was to conduct a massive search and destroy operation in the area known as War Zone C between Saigon and the Cambodian border. One objective was to locate the elusive headquarters of the VC in South Vietnam, the Central Office of South Vietnam (COSVN), along with all other NVA and VC forces and installations in the area. US analysts at the time believed COSVN was a "mini-Pentagon", complete with typists, file cabinets, and staff workers with a large guard force. In reality it was closer to what the US would consider a forward command post: highly mobile and composed of a handful of senior commanders, staff officers, and support personnel.

Junction City's operational concept was a "hammer and anvil," with airborne forces "flushing out" the VC headquarters and driving it against a prepared "anvil" of other forces. The US forces included most of the 1st Infantry Division, the 25th Infantry Division, the 3rd Brigade of the 4th Infantry Division, the 196th Light Infantry Brigade, the 173rd Airborne Brigade and elements of the 11th Armored Cavalry Regiment (11th ACR).

The VC had only four regiments available for the immediate defense of War Zone C: COSVN's guard unit – the 70th Guard, the 101st Infantry Regiment, plus two of the 9th Infantry Division – the 271st and 272nd Regiments. The third element of the 9th Division, the 273rd Regiment, remained in War Zone D as a reserve.

== Operation ==
II Field Force, Vietnam under General Jonathan Seaman started the operation on 22 February 1967 (while Operation Cedar Falls was winding down). The initial operation was carried out by the 1st (commanded by Major general John H. Hay) and the 25th (commanded by Major general Frederick C. Weyand) infantry divisions, who deployed their forces to the north of the operational area to create the "anvil" on which the VC 9th Division would be crushed. At the same time as the movement of eight infantry battalions with 249 helicopters, 845 paratroopers of the 2nd Battalion, 503rd Infantry Regiment (2/503rd) and Battery A of 3rd Battalion, 319th Field Artillery Regiment (3/319th) were air-dropped by 13 C-130s.

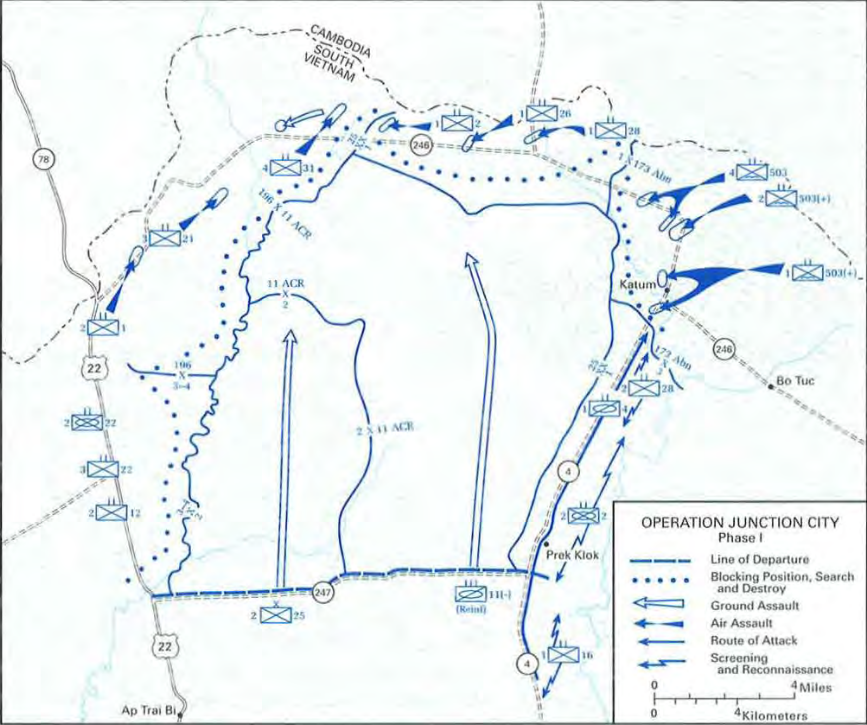
Operation Junction City Phase I

At first, the operations appeared to be succeeding. Objectives were reached without encountering great resistance and on 23 February, the 11th ACR and the 2nd Brigade, 25th Infantry Division, the "hammer" of armor struck against the '"anvil" of the infantry and airborne positioned north and west, giving the VC forces seemingly no chance to escape. The VC claim that on the first day of the operation they killed almost 200 US troops, destroyed 16 armored vehicles and shot down 16 aircraft. The VC had already moved their headquarters to Cambodia and launched several attacks to inflict losses and wear down the Americans. The US claim that their losses were 28 killed against the VC's 54 killed after the first five days of campaigning.

On 28 February, the first major battle of the operation took place at Prek Klok. In the morning, a patrolling company of the US 3rd Brigade, 1st Division was ambushed by a battalion of the VC 101st Regiment. With effective air and artillery support, the ambushed company held its position for over six hours until it was reinforced by three other companies from the 3rd Brigade. In the evening the VC were forced to withdraw, leaving 167 dead while US losses were 25 dead and 28 wounded.

The second major battle started on the evening of 10 March. Two battalions of the VC 272nd Regiment attacked Fire Support Base (FSB) II at Prek Klok with a heavy mortar bombardment, then RPG-2, recoilless rifle fire and infantry charges through the night. Assisted by powerful air strikes and massive artillery support from the US 3rd Brigade's nearby bases, the base's battalion-size garrison repulsed the VC attacks after six hours of fighting. US losses were 3 killed and 38 wounded against the VC's 197 killed but only 12 personal weapons recovered.

On 18 March 1967, General Bruce Palmer Jr., new commander of II Field Force, Vietnam, launched the second phase of Junction City, this time directly to the east by the 1st Infantry Division and the 11th ACR, reinforced with three additional brigades: the 1st of the 9th Infantry Division, the 3rd of the 4th Infantry Division and the 173rd Airborne. This maneuver resulted in the first major battle of the operation on 19 March: the Battle of Ap Bau Bang II, when the VC 273rd Regiment attacked both FSB 20 and an ambush position established by elements of the 3rd Squadron, Fifth Cavalry. Heavy fighting resulted before the 273d Regiment was forced to retire in part by fire support from artillery and air strikes. US forces reported VC losses as 227 dead and three captured. US losses were three killed and 63 wounded.

On 21 March, the VC 272nd Regiment and elements of U-80 Artillery launched another attack against the US 3rd Brigade of the 4th Infantry Division at FSB Gold near Ap Suoi Tre. The attacking unit was repulsed after four hours of fighting. VC losses were reported by US forces as 647 dead and seven captured on site. US losses were 31 killed and 109 wounded.

In the early morning hours of 31 March, the VC 273rd Regiment and one battalion of the 70th Guard attacked two battalions of the US 2nd Brigade of the 1st Infantry Division stationed at Landing Zone George near Ap Gu. With heavy fire support from both US Air Force aircraft and artillery at two nearby FSBs, the garrison repulsed the attack. The VC lost about 600 dead and five captured. US losses were 17 killed and 102 wounded.

On 16 April, II Field Force, in agreement with MACV, decided to continue operations with a third phase of Operation Junction City. Elements of the 25th Infantry Division continued to sweep the area until 14 May, retrieving large amounts of materiel but with little contact with VC units.

== Aftermath ==
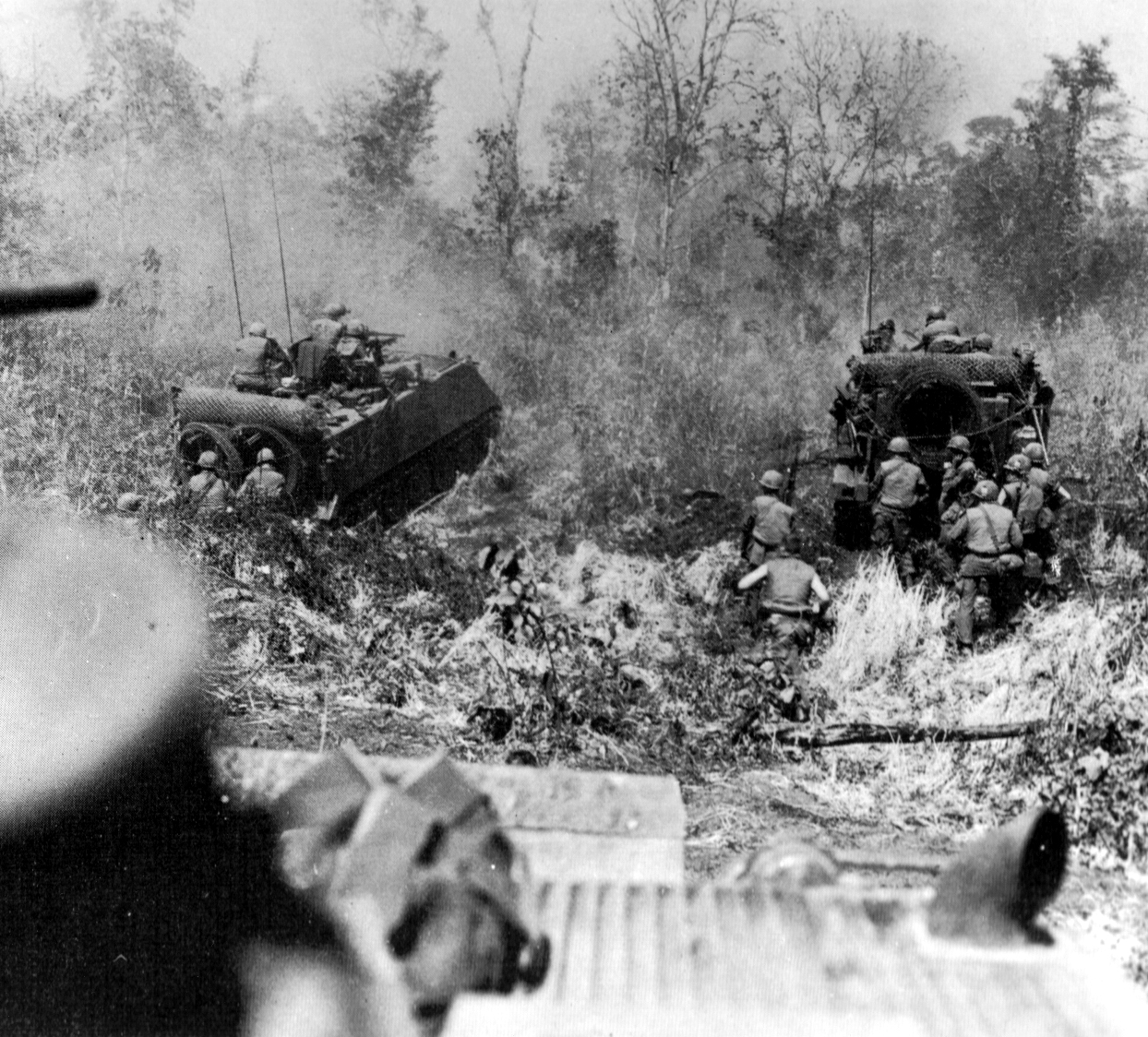
The US infantry enjoyed advantages in mechanization over the Viet Cong forces encountered, including the M113 and in certain locales, tanks

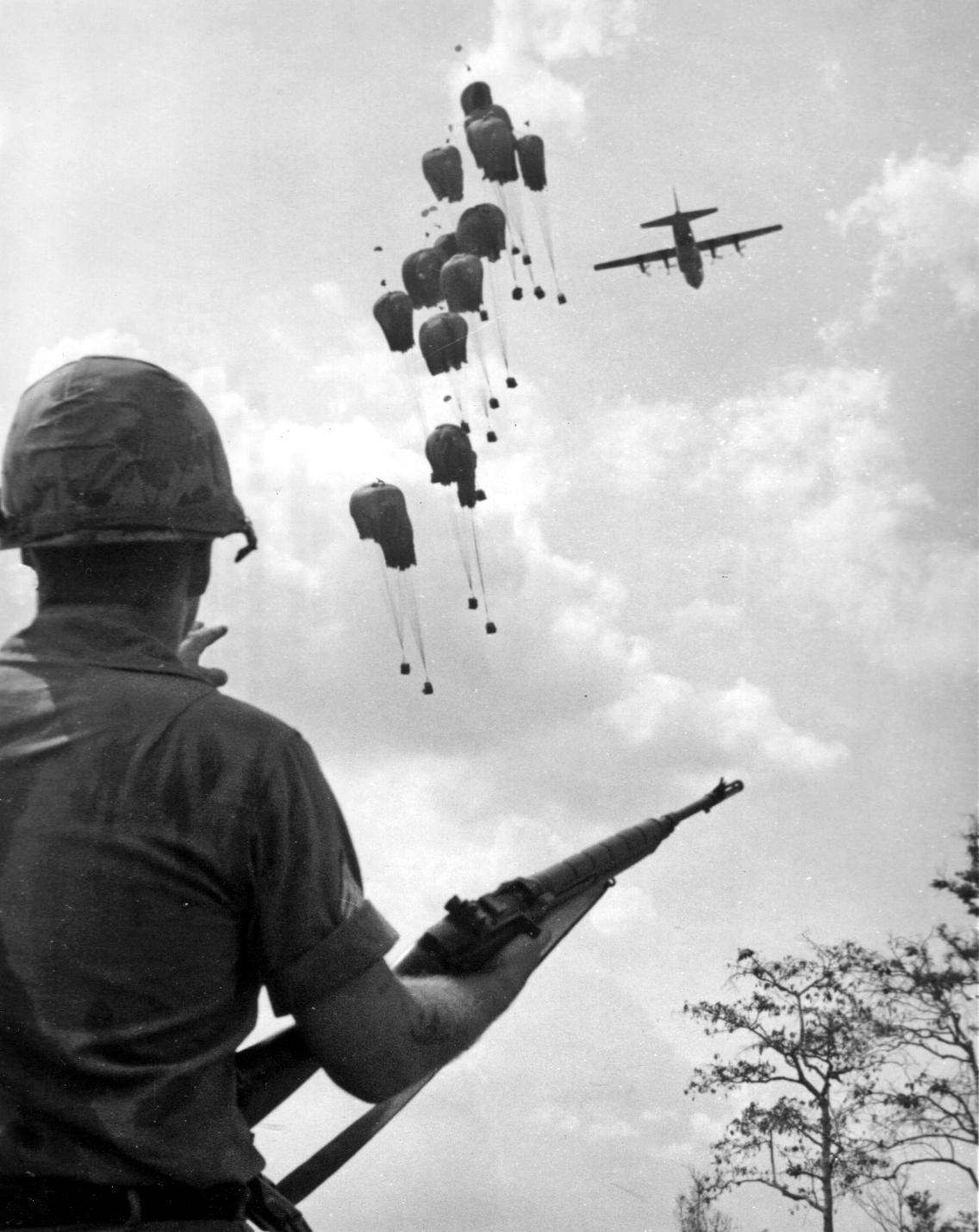
Air drop of supplies in Operation Junction City

Tay Ninh Province was picked over thoroughly and VC forces suffered significant losses, including large amounts of material captured: 810 tons of rice, 600 tons of small arms, 500,000 pages of documents. The American losses were not negligible, however, amounting to 282 dead and over 1,500 injured.

According to calculations by the American command, the VC 9th Division was seriously weakened by the operation, suffering the loss of 2,728 killed, 34 captured men and 139 deserters. 100 crew-served weapons and 491 individual weapons were captured. The Vietnam Ministry of Defense in April 2017 claimed that they had suffered casualties of 10.2% (1275) of their total strength (15,000 men), with 1.7% (255) of total strength killed.

After Junction City concluded, the American forces were shifted to other areas of operations, and the region which was supposed to be in the firm control of the South Vietnamese government soon fell prey again to infiltration by the VC forces when they returned from their sanctuaries in Cambodia.

Allied intelligence later learned that, as a result of the operation, the VC moved most of their main force units across the border into Cambodia, rather than stationing them in South Vietnam where they were more vulnerable to attack. The border sanctuaries in Cambodia which had previously been logistical areas were expanded dramatically, creating further tension between Cambodia and South Vietnam and its Allies.

With a huge consumption of resources and equipment, including 366,000 rounds of artillery and 3,235 tons of bombs, the American forces had inflicted losses on the VC and demonstrated the utility of airborne and mechanized forces in terrain previously considered problematic for their use. Despite the tactical results, Junction City on the operational level didn't accomplish its main objective, and failed to yield any long-term strategic gain.
