= Lenny Simpson =

American tennis player (1948–2024)

Lendward Simpson (September 23, 1948 – February 9, 2024) was an American professional tennis player and founder of One Love Tennis, a tennis and academic enrichment program for at-risk kids.

== Early career ==
Simpson was introduced to tennis in 1953 at age 5 at the nearby tennis court of physician, tennis champion and civil rights activist Hubert A. Eaton by Althea Gibson who lived with the Eatons and was practicing there. Althea Gibson was the first African-American athlete to cross the color line in international tennis and would go on to become a barrier breaking tennis champion and winner of Wimbledon, US Open and French Open.

Simpson met Dr. "Whirlwind" Johnson. Robert Walter Johnson was known as the "godfather of black tennis". Dr. Johnson also mentored and coached Althea Gibson and Arthur Ashe.

Simpson entered the tennis circuit at age 9 with Dr. Johnson's Junior Development Team in 1957. He traveled and often roomed with Arthur Ashe on the predominantly white tennis circuit for almost a decade. He and the older Ashe became good friends.

== Ranking ==
Simpson was ranked in the top 10 nationally in every age group as a junior in singles and in doubles. In the early 1960's, he won the ATA National Boys' Singles and Doubles Championships. and played U.S. Open Championships in 1964, 1965 and 1966. From 1964 to 1967, partnered with Luis Glass for ATA National Men's Doubles Championships. Simpson won the 1964 USLTA Eastern Boys 14 and under singles title at Forest Hills, defeating Dick Stockton in the finals. Later that same year, at age 15, he became the youngest male to ever play at the U.S. National Championships at Forest Hills. He won first round match then lost to Arthur Ashe in second round match.

Simpson left Wilmington [North Carolina] in the 8th grade to attend private prep school at The Hill School in Pennsylvania and Cheshire Academy in Connecticut after receiving academic and tennis scholarships to both schools. He won the National Prep School Championship in 1967. He played no.1 and was the first person inducted in the Cheshire Academy Hall of Fame in 1989.

While partnered with North Carolina native Bonnie Logan, Simpson won the ATA National Mixed Doubles title four consecutive times from 1967 to 1970.

== College ==
Simpson was heavily recruited and went on to become a top collegiate player at East Tennessee State University 1968–1973 on a full scholarship.

Simpson was Captain of the ETSU tennis team from 1968 to 1972 and coached the team in 1972 and 1973. Simpson was a quarter finalist at NCAA tournament and played no. 1 in singles and doubles all through his college career. He was the Ohio Valley Conference Champion in Singles and Doubles.

== Professional ==
Simpson entered the Pro Tour and turned professional in 1973 and was the first African-American to play World Team Tennis.

Simpson joined the Detroit Loves and was the No. 3 singles player behind Phil Dent who was No. 5 in the world at that time.

Simpson was a part of the Breaking the Barrier Tennis Exhibit presented at the International Tennis Hall of Fame in 2010, and is featured in two online exhibits produced by the International Tennis Hall of Fame titled Breaking the Barrier: The ATA and Black Tennis Pioneers and Breaking Boundaries in Black Tennis. He was inducted into the N.C. Tennis Hall of Fame in 2011 and the Greater Wilmington Sports Hall of Fame in 2012 and served on their board of directors. He was inducted into the Black Tennis Hall of Fame in 2014.

== Tennis exhibition ==
Simpson also organized celebrity tennis exhibition and youth clinic fundraisers including John McEnroe and Todd Martin and the Bryan brothers.

In 2013 in Wilmington, North Carolina, Simpson started The Lenny Simpson Tennis and Education Fund (LSTEF), a year-round tennis, mentoring and academic program for at-risk youth.

Simpson was the executive director of LSTEF One Love Program.

== Death ==
Simpson died on February 9, 2024, at the age of 75.
