= Bàu Bàng district =

Bàu Bàng district Huyện Bàu Bàng
- District
- Interactive map of Bàu Bàng district
- Country: Vietnam
- Region: Southeast
- Province: Bình Dương
- Capital: Lai Uyên

Area
  - Total: 130.949 sq mi (339.157 km^{2})

Population (2018)
  - Total: 85,653
- Time zone: UTC+7 (Indochina Time)

Bàu Bàng (Classical Vietnamese: 保邦) is a former rural district of Bình Dương province in the Southeast region of Vietnam. It was established on December 29, 2013, and has a population of over 82,000.

Bàu Bàng is the site of the first and second battle of Bàu Bàng in 1965 and 1967, respectively.

== Administrative divisions ==
Bàu Bàng is divided into 1 town and 6 rural communes:

- Lai Uyên town
- Cây Trường II
- Hưng Hòa
- Lai Hưng
- Long Nguyên
- Tân Hưng
- Trừ Văn Thố
