= 33rd Field Artillery Regiment =

US military unit

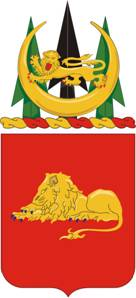
- Coat of arms
- Active: 1918
- Country: United States
- Branch: Army
- Type: Field artillery
- Role: CARS Parent Regiment
- Motto(s): SERVABO FIDEM (I Will Keep Faith)
- Branch color: Scarlet

Insignia
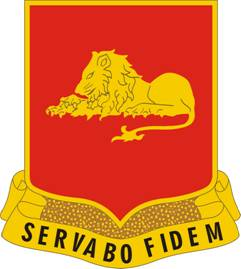
- Distinctive unit insignia

The 33rd Field Artillery Regiment is an inactive field artillery regiment of the United States Army, first constituted in 1918 in the National Army (USA). A parent regiment under the U.S. Army Regimental System, the regiment has no active regiments. The regiment saw active service with the 1st Infantry Division in World War II. The regiment's 2nd and 6th Battalions served in Vietnam.

== Lineage and honors ==
=== Lineage ===
- Constituted 5 July 1918 in the National Army as the 33d Field Artillery and assigned to the 11th Division.
- Organized 5 August 1918 at Camp Meade, Maryland. Demobilized 12 December 1918 at Camp Meade, Maryland.
- Reconstituted 22 July 1929 in the Regular Army as the 33d Field Artillery and assigned to the 6th Division.
- Relieved 1 January 1930 from assignment to the 6th Division.
- Redesignated 1 October 1940 as the 33d Field Artillery Battalion, assigned to the 1st Division (later redesignated as the 1st Infantry Division), and activated at Fort Ethan Allen, Vermont.
- Relieved 15 February 1957 from assignment to the 1st Infantry Division; concurrently, reorganized and redesignated as the 33d Artillery, a parent regiment under the Combat Arms Regimental System.
- Redesignated 1 September 1971 as the 33d Field Artillery.
- Withdrawn 28 February 1987 from the Combat Arms Regimental System, reorganized under the United States Army Regimental System, and transferred to the United States Army Training and Doctrine Command.
- Withdrawn 15 August 1995 from the United States Army Training and Doctrine Command.

=== Campaign participation credit ===
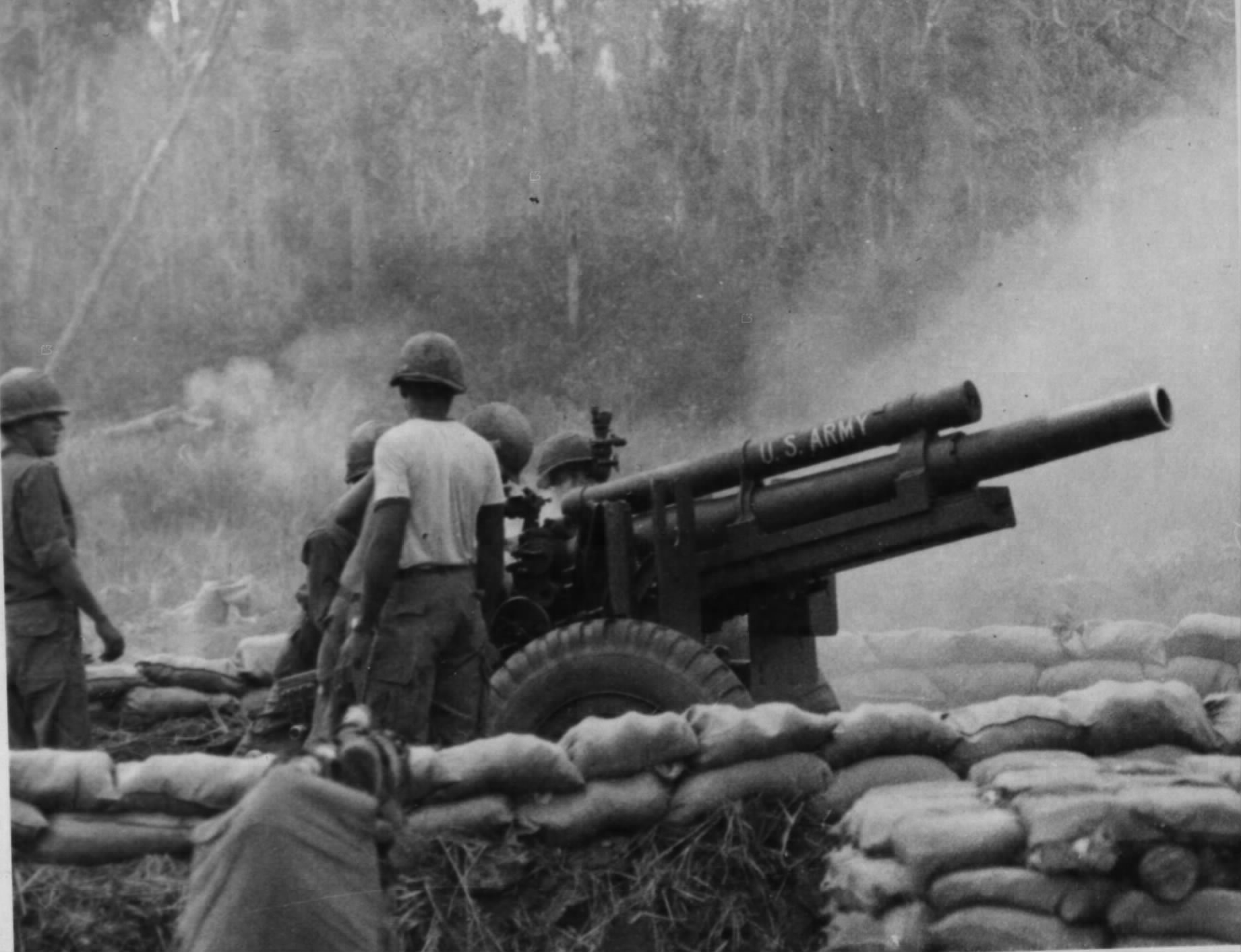
A gun crew of Battery A, 2nd Battalion, 33rd Artillery, fire a 105mm howitzer in support of the 1st Battalion, 18th Infantry, during Operation Attleboro, 18 November 1966

- World War II: Algeria–French Morocco (with arrowhead); Tunisia; Sicily (with arrowhead); Normandy (with arrowhead); Northern France; Rhineland; Ardennes‑Alsace; Central Europe
- Vietnam: Defense; Counteroffensive; Counteroffensive, Phase II; Counteroffensive, Phase III; Tet Counteroffensive; Counteroffensive, Phase IV; Counteroffensive, Phase V; Counteroffensive, Phase VI; Tet 69/Counteroffensive; Summer–Fall 1969; Winter–Spring 1970
- Operation Iraqi Freedon:"OIF II", Forward Operating Base Summerall, Iraq 2004

=== Decorations ===
- Meritorious Unit Commendation (Army), Streamer embroidered VIETNAM 1966–1967 (2d Battalion, 33d Artillery, cited; DA GO 17, 1968)
- Meritorious Unit Commendation (Army), Streamer embroidered VIETNAM 1968 (6th Battalion, 33d Artillery, cited; DA GO 42, 1969)
- French Croix de Guerre with Palm, World War II, Streamer embroidered KASSERINE (33d Field Artillery Battalion cited; DA GO 43, 1950)
- French Croix de Guerre with Palm, World War II, Streamer embroidered NORMANDY (33d Field Artillery Battalion cited; DA GO 43, 1950)
- French Croix de Guerre, World War II, Fourragere (33d Field Artillery Battalion cited; DA GO 43, 1950)
- Belgian Fourragere 1940 (33d Field Artillery Battalion cited; DA GO 43, 1950)
  - Cited in the Order of the Day of the Belgian Army for action at Mons (33d Field Artillery Battalion cited; DA GO 43, 1950)
  - Cited in the Order of the Day of the Belgian Army for action at Eupen-Malmedy (33d Field Artillery Battalion cited; DA GO 43, 1950)
- Presidential Unit Citation for actions during OIF II, Camp Baji, Iraq

== Heraldry ==
=== Distinctive unit insignia ===
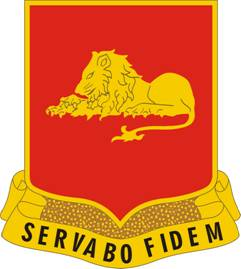

- Description: A Gold color metal and enamel device 1 5/32 inches (2.9 cm) in height overall consisting of a shield blazoned: Gules, a lion dormant Or. Attached below the shield a Gold scroll inscribed “SERVABO FIDEM” in Black letters.
- Symbolism: The colors red and yellow identify the organization as Artillery. The lion, though depicted asleep, is said to sleep with its eyes open (though they may appear shut) and is thus “ever on guard” and ready for any emergency and action.
- Background: The distinctive unit insignia was originally approved for the 33d Field Artillery Regiment on 17 June 1937. It was redesignated for the 33d Field Artillery Battalion on 3 January 1941. It was redesignated for the 33d Artillery Regiment on 11 April 1958. The insignia was redesignated effective 1 September 1971 for the 33d Field Artillery Regiment and amended to change the symbolism of the design.

=== Coat of arms ===
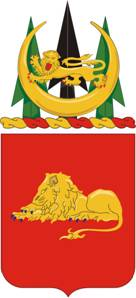

- Description
  - Shield: Gules, a lion dormant Or armed Azure.
  - Crest: On a wreath Or and Gules, two arrowheads Vert issuing palewise, another Sable issuing likewise from within a crescent overall of the first and surmounted by a lion guardant of the like armed and langued of the second.
  - Motto: SERVABO FIDEM (I Will Keep Faith).
- Symbolism
  - Shield: The colors red and yellow identify the organization as Artillery. The lion, though depicted asleep, is said to sleep with its eyes open (though they may appear shut) and is thus “ever on guard” and ready for any emergency and action.
  - Crest: The three arrowheads in the crest refer to the unit's assault landings in Algeria-French Morocco, Sicily and Normandy. The crescent alludes to Tunis and the lion to Normandy, the two green arrowheads referring to the awards of the French Croix de Guerre (the predominating color of the ribbon being green) for the action at Kasserine Pass, Tunis and for the Normandy landing.
- Background: The coat of arms was originally approved for the 33d Field Artillery Regiment on 17 June 1937. It was redesignated for the 33d Field Artillery Battalion on 10 January 1941. It was redesignated for the 33d Artillery Regiment on 11 April 1958. It was amended to add the crest on 29 January 1965. The insignia was redesignated effective 1 September 1971 for the 33d Field Artillery Regiment and amended to change the symbolism of the design.

== Current configuration ==
- 1st Battalion 33rd Field Artillery Regiment (United States): Inactive since 2006.
- 2nd Battalion 33rd Field Artillery Regiment (United States): Inactive since 1983.
- 3rd Battalion 33rd Field Artillery Regiment (United States): Inactive since 1963.
- 4th Battalion 33rd Field Artillery Regiment (United States): Inactive since 1965.
- 5th Battalion 33rd Field Artillery Regiment (United States): Inactive since 1961.
- 6th Battalion 33rd Field Artillery Regiment (United States): Inactive since 1970.

== See also ==
- Field Artillery Branch (United States)
