= 1929 in China =

- Decades: 1900s; 1910s; 1920s; 1930s; 1940s
- See also: Other events of 1929; History of China • Timeline • Years

Events from the year 1929 in China.

== Incumbents ==
- Chairman of the Nationalist government: Chiang Kai-shek
- Premier: Tan Yankai
- Vice Premier: Feng Yuxiang

== Events ==
=== March ===
- March 5 – Yi Peiji was appointed as the president of the National Palace Museum and the curator of the antiquities museum by Nationalist Government.

=== April ===
- April 1 – Zhifu is captured by rebel forces in course of the Warlord Rebellion in northeastern Shandong, and subsequently largely destroyed.
- April 11 – Battle of Yichang in western Hubei between the armies of the Sichuan clique and New Guangxi clique
- Mid-April – Zhang Zongchang's warlord rebel army in northeastern Shandong collapses as result of indiscipline and a government counter-offensive.

=== May ===
- May 15: First Battle of Guilin: Hunan Army attacks Guilin, Guangxi
- May 17–21: Second Battle of Guangzhou between New Guangxi clique and Guangdong Army

=== June ===
- June 6 – 1929 Westlake exposition was opened.
- June 7–18: Battle of Liuzhou, Guangxi between armies of New Guangxi clique and Hunan

=== July ===
- July 25 – the Soviet government's Assistant Commissar of Foreign Affairs, Lev Karakhan, had issued a manifesto to the Chinese government promising the return of the Chinese Eastern Railway to Chinese control with no financial cost. (Sino-Soviet conflict (1929))

=== August ===
- August 26 – the Karakhan Manifesto was published by the Soviet press, but the document failed to mention neither the return of CER to the Chinese nor the lack of financial compensation. (Sino-Soviet conflict (1929))

=== September ===
- September 23 – Liu Zhennian launches a campaign to crush the Red Spears' uprising in Shandong (1928–1929).

=== October ===
- October 10 – the closing of the 1929 Westlake exposition.
- October 18–24: battle at Zhengzhou, Henan between Feng Yuxiang's Northwest Army and National Revolutionary Army

=== November ===
- November – The Red Spear Society ceases to exist on the northern Shandong Peninsula as result of Liu Zhennian's counter-insurgency campaign.
- November 20 – Taiping Fire and Marine Insurance, as predecessor of China Taiping Insurance was founded in Shanghai.
- November 30 – end of battle of Heishiguan

=== December ===
- December – Gutian Congress

== Births ==
=== January ===
- January 13 — Ge Cunzhuang, actor (d. 2016)

=== February ===
- February 24 — Su Wenmao, xiangsheng comedian (d. 2015)

=== March ===
- March 8 — Zeng Yi, virologist (d. 2020)

=== April ===
- April 7 — Yang Jie, television director and producer (d. 2017)
- April 8 — Sun Jiadong, aerospace engineer

=== May ===
- May 15 — Zhou Guangzhao, theoretical physicist (d. 2024)

=== June ===
- June 4 — Tian Jiyun, former Vice Premier of China
- June 21 — Ying Ruocheng, actor, director, playwright and former Vice Minister of Culture (d. 2003)
- June 30 — Yang Ti-liang, senior Hong Kong judge (d. 2023)

=== July ===
- July 4 — Tan Shaowen, 10th Secretary of the Tianjin Municipal Committee of the Chinese Communist Party (d. 1993)
- July 9 — Chi Haotian, 8th Minister of National Defense
- July 13 — Hou Yunde, virologist, geneticist and genetic engineer
- July 30 — Ji Chaozhu, diplomat (d. 2020)
- Chen Jinhua, politician (d. 2016)

=== August ===
- August 9 — Lui Che-woo, Hong Kong business magnate, investor and philanthropist (d. 2024)
- August 15 — Xiao Yang, 11th Mayor of Chongqing (d. 1998)

=== September ===
- Ding Guangen, 8th Minister of Railways (d. 2012)

=== October ===
- October 13 — Walasse Ting, Chinese-American painter (d. 2010)
- October 15 — Dong Cunrui, soldier in the People's Liberation Army (d. 1948)
- October 19 — Deng Sanrui, shipbuilding engineer (d. 2020)

=== November ===
- November 15 — Li Guangxi, national-level actor (d. 2022)
- November 26 — Tang Chongti, parasitologist
- November 28 — Yu Lihua, Taiwanese writer (d. 2020)
- Mao Zhiyong, politician (d. 2019)

=== December ===
- December 26 — Gong Yuzhi, theorist and politician in the Chinese Communist Party (d. 2007)
- December 29
  - Shen Jilan, politician (d. 2020)
  - He Zhenliang, politician and diplomat (d. 2015)
- December 31 — Guo Lanying, operatic soprano

=== Dates unknown ===
- Li Senmao, 9th Minister of Railways (d. 1996)

== Deaths ==
- January 5 — Wang Daxie, 14th Premier of the Republic of China (b. 1859)
- January 10
  - Yang Yuting, general in the Fengtian Army (b. 1885)
  - Chang Yinhuai, statesman and general (b. 1888)
- January 19 — Liang Qichao, politician, social and political activist, journalist and intellectual (b. 1873)
- February 25 — Su Zhaozheng, early leader of the Chinese Communist Party and a labour movement activist (b. 1885)
- March 18 — Lü Yanzhi, architect (b. 1894)
- June 18 — Zaize, Manchu noble (b. 1868)
- August 30 — Peng Pai, pioneer of the Chinese agrarian movement and a leading revolutionary in the Chinese Communist Party (b. 1896)

=== Dates unknown ===
- Chu Yupu, general (b. 1887)
