= Battle of Guilin =

The Battle of Guilin may refer to:

- Siege of Guilin (1647), military engagement between the Qing dynasty and Southern Ming remnants supported by Portuguese gunners
- First Battle of Guilin (1929)
- Second Battle of Guilin (1930)
- Battle of Guilin–Liuzhou (1944), during the Second Sino-Japanese War
