= Battle of Liuzhou =

- Part of the Chiang-Gui War
Date	June 7–18, 1929
Location	Liuzhou, central Guangxi
Result	After the Hunan army occupied Luzhai, it captured Liucheng halfway. On the 18th, the Guangxi army counterattacked. The Hunan army withdrew from Liuzhou.

Belligerents
Hunan Army; Supported by: Nationalist government	New Guangxi clique

The battle in Liuzhou(traditional Chinese: 柳州戰鬥; simplified Chinese: 柳州战斗) took place from June 7 to 18, 1929. The location was in central Guangxi, China. The two sides in the Liuzhou Battle were the Yunnanese army of Wu Yuanfeng, Zhang Kairu, Yang Ximin, Fan Shisheng and Gu Pinzhen and the Gui army of Lin Juntin and Zhang Fa-chun. At the end of the battle, the Gui army was defeated and the Yunnan army won.The two warring parties in Liuzhou were Hunan Army and Guangxi Army on the other.
