= Sergey Radchenko =

British historian

Sergey S. Radchenko (Russian: Сергей Сергеевич Радченко; born 1980) is a Soviet-born British historian. He is the Rupert Murdoch Distinguished Professor at the Henry A. Kissinger Center for Global Affairs, Johns Hopkins School of Advanced International Studies, and has held a part-time appointment at Cardiff University since 2021. He was previously Reader at Aberystwyth University, Lecturer at University of Nottingham Ningbo China, a Global Fellow and a Public Policy Fellow at the Woodrow Wilson Centre, and as the Zi Jiang Distinguished Professor at East China Normal University (Shanghai).

He is a historian of the Cold War, mainly known for his work on Sino-Soviet relations and Soviet foreign policy. He also works on Russian and Chinese foreign and security policies, and is a frequent contributor to Foreign Affairs, The New York Times, The Spectator and other outlets.

Radchenko was born in Primorsky Krai in 1980 and, for the first fifteen years of his life, lived in Korsakov, Sakhalin Oblast, Russian SFSR, USSR. In 1995 Radchenko left Sakhalin for the United States as an exchange student in the US government-funded FLEX/FSA program. He graduated from Marshall High School in Marshall, TX, in 1995.

Radchenko then pursued his studies in East Texas, later in Hong Kong, and finally in the UK. He attended the London School of Economics and Political Science (LSE) in London, earning a BSc in International Relations in 2001 and a PhD in International History in 2005. His PhD thesis, completed under the supervision of Odd Arne Westad, focused on Sino-Soviet relations. It was later published in a revised form as Two Suns in the Heavens: the Sino-Soviet Struggle for Supremacy, 1962-67 (Stanford, CA: Stanford UP, 2008).

In later years, Radchenko worked as a faculty member at the National University of Mongolia (2003–05), Assistant Professor at Pittsburg State University (2005–07), fellow at the London School of Economics (2007–09), Lecturer at the University of Nottingham Ningbo China (2009–13), Reader at Aberystwyth University (2013–16), and Professor at Cardiff University (2016–21) before he moved to Johns Hopkins SAIS in 2021.

His work focuses on Soviet and Russian history and Sino-Russian relations, and emphasizes the importance of legitimacy and recognition in foreign policy. This thesis is presented in detail in his book To Run the World: the Kremlin's Cold War Bid for Global Power, published by Cambridge University Press in 2025.

Languages: English, Russian, Italian, Chinese (Mandarin), and Mongolian.

== Honors and awards ==
- 2025: Lionel Gelber Prize for To Run the World
- 2025: Shortlisted for the Pushkin House Prize for To Run the World.
- 2026: Bronze Medal, Arthur Ross Book Award for To Run the World.

== Selected publications ==
- Radchenko, Sergey. Two suns in the heavens: the Sino-Soviet struggle for supremacy, 1962-1967. Vol. 33. Woodrow Wilson Center Press, 2009. ISBN 978-0-8047-5879-6
- Craig, Campbell, and Sergey S. Radchenko. The atomic bomb and the origins of the Cold War. Yale University Press, 2008. ISBN 978-0-300-11028-9
- Kalinovsky, Artemy, and Sergey Radchenko, eds. The end of the Cold War and the Third World: new perspectives on regional conflict. Taylor & Francis, 2011. ISBN 978-0-415-60054-5
- Radchenko, Sergey. Unwanted Visionaries: The Soviet Failure in Asia at the End of the Cold War. Oxford University Press, 2014. ISBN 978-0-19-993877-3
- To Run the World: The Kremlin's Cold War Bid for Global Power. Cambridge University Press, 2024. ISBN 978-1-10-847735-2
