= Karakhan Manifesto =

Statement concerning Soviet policy towards China

Declaration to the Chinese Nation and the Governments of Southern and Northern China
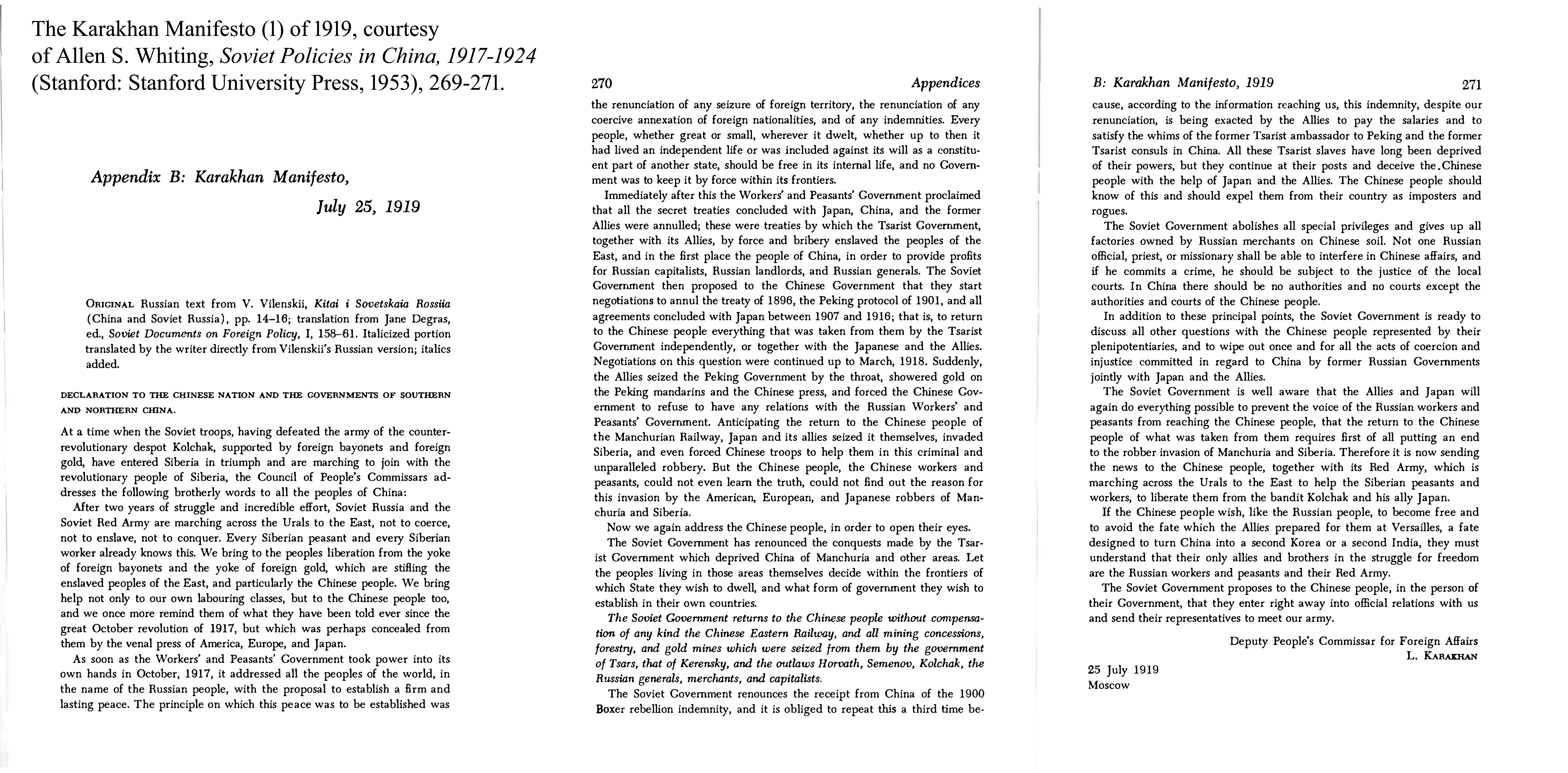
- Translated English version of Karakhan Manifesto I
- Signed: 25 July 1919

The first Karakhan Manifesto was a statement of Soviet policy toward China dated 25 July 1919. It was issued by Lev Karakhan, the deputy for the Commissariat for Foreign Affairs for Soviet Russia. Commissariat in Russian refers to a ministry. The Karakhan Manifesto offered to relinquish and return to China territories seized during the Tsarist Amur Annexation, extraterritoriality, economic concessions, and Russia's share of the Boxer indemnity. These and similar treaties had been denounced by Chinese historians, diplomats and those without state ties from the 20th century to the present (21st century) as part of the West's (including Russia) "unequal treaties" and as part of China's century of humiliation (approximately 1839-1949). The original first Karakhan Manifesto created a favorable impression of Soviet socialism (communism) among Chinese intellectuals and socialists. However, within one month (technically one month and one day) of the issuance of the first Karakhan Manifesto, Izvestiia (a Soviet state run newspaper) issued a revised Karakhan Manifesto which did not promise to return territories nor the Chinese Eastern Railway (C.E.R.) to China. Many Chinese saw this as a betrayal and that the USSR and the Bolsheviks were no different than the other imperialists who had carved up China through the Treaty Port system (over 100 Chinese cities were used as treaty ports) and the unequal treaties with foreign powers such as Germany, the United States, Great Britain and France.

== Background: The "Why" Behind the Issuing of the First Karakhan Manifesto ==
The Russian Civil War began as soon as the October Revolution (November 1917) had finished. At the beginning of the civil war, the anti-Bolshevik battles were sporadic and localized. The Russ. Civil War began because the Bolsheviks wanted to destroy the Constituent Assembly which was a form of multi-party rule that they had with other political parties and because Bolshevism (national communism) nationalized and confiscated all private property especially those belonging to foreigners and foreign entities (whether the properties were owned in full by foreign entities or were held as joint-holdings). The Bolsheviks quickly dissolved the Constituent Assembly and annulled the political rights of Russian Mensheviks, Kadets, anarchists, Left SRs, Right SRs and others on January 19, 1918. This is because the Constituent Assembly represented a "power-sharing" government whose majority were SRs (the Socialist Revolutionary Party) and not Bolsheviks. At that time, this was an exceptionally radical, authoritarian and oppressive move by Lenin. This was to be followed by more actions and policies which were equally oppressive and authoritarian. On Feb. 21, 1918, Lenin reinstated the death penalty for crimes of counter-revolution and defection to other non-Bolshevik parties. He believed that the Bolsheviks could not remake Russian society without terror and the use of terror by the Cheka. June 1918 began the policies of "War Communism," and unofficially, the "Red Terror." War Communism consisted of the nationalization of all Russian industry (plants, small factories, mines, foreign owned docks and port-facilities, foreign owned ships, trains/train wagons, etc.) using the Cheka and Red Guards and food requisitioning which was coerced from the peasants to feed the factory workers (the proletariat) and the urban support base of the Bolsheviks. Note that the Red Terror began in June 1918, but was not formally announced until September 1, 1918. The Red Terror was formally announced after Aug. 30, 1918 when two assassination attempts against Bolshevik leaders took place. The first failed against Lenin, but he was shot twice. The second assassination attempt killed the Petrograd Chekist, Uritsky. The Red Terror enacted by the Bolsheviks targeted all counter-revolutionaries who opposed their rule such as the leaders of the Kronstadt rebellion (defection to the SR's) and various peasant rebellions from Moscow to the Urals in the summer of 1918. By September 1, 1918, this campaign produced widespread violence, arbitrary arrests, torture and in general, punitive repressions against innocent citizens, striking workers and anti-Bolshevik elements, parties and social groups. Ironically, the Bolsheviks used Latvian, Hungarian and Chinese Cheka (secret or political police) units to carry out some of the most brutal purges. These units were employed when Russians or Ukrainians found the work to be distasteful or had loyalties to those who were being repressed. Here are several histories of the Chinese Cheka units. The caption in the photo labelled "Chinese Cheka" in Russian reads, "Even the sailors, these desperate hooligans and robbers were scared by the honest and life-giving cross of our Lord [held by the Orthodox priest]. Then the commissars called out the Chinese [CHON units of the Cheka] and they calmly without quivering shot the priest. This occurred in Moscow."

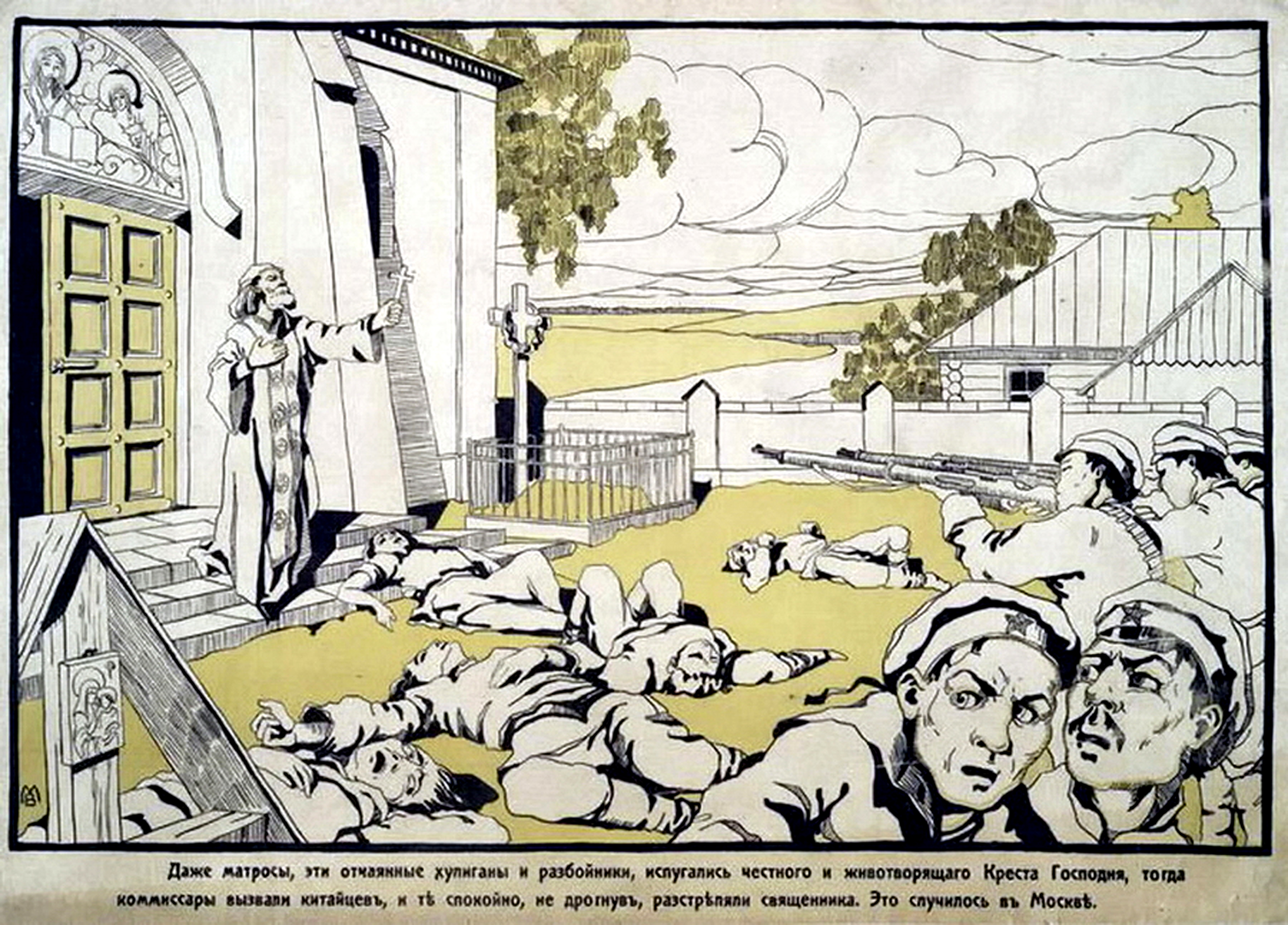
Chinese Cheka spec. CHON units shooting priest 1920 Moscow- White Guard Propaganda Poster

Thus, due to the Bolshevik's economic policies of state control over all property and land, many Western and Central European, North American, and Asian governments sent troops to fight against the Bolshevik's Red Army during the Russian Civil War. These troops were called the Interventionist or Entente forces. The United States and the Wilson regime saw the Bolsheviks as bringing a form of tyranny and oppression to Russia far worse than rule under the Tsar. The U.S. felt guided by a moral obligation and economic self-interest in deciding to send an American force of approximately 14,000 soldiers to Russia to help overthrow the Bolsheviks. Thus, the Russian Civil War began with the Right SR's (Socialist Revolutionaries) and Mensheviks (along with regional and municipal governments- the latter called zemstvos) supporting the White Army which fought against the Reds (the Bolsheviks). The White Army and White Movement were supported by eleven separate Interventionalist military forces from the United States, Japan, Canada, Italy, the Great Britain, France, Poland, Czechoslovakia (not yet established until October 1918), China and others. Japan sent as many as 70,000 soldiers to help overthrow the Bolsheviks. As one can see, the Bolsheviks were besieged on many fronts throughout the entire former Russian empire. Thus, they sought allies and in order to gain Chinese allies, the Bolsheviks under Chicherin and Karakhan made promises to return Chinese lands taken by the Tsars in the 19th century (best exemplified by the Treaties of Aigun in 1858 and the Treaty of Beijing in 1860). In both cases, Tsarist Russia sent small forces of armed vessels (with cannons) down China's Amur River and forcibly acquired the land beginning on the left bank (1858) and later the right bank (1860) of the Amur River.

The Karakhan Manifesto was issued in order to win the support of communists and socialists throughout Asia and especially in China in the event that the Civil War turned against the Bolsheviks/Soviets. The Bolsheviks also hoped to count on the support of socialists and communists in Korea, Vietnam, India and other areas in Asia. The Bolsheviks believed that, if they began to lose the Civil War, they could garner the support of thousands (and possibly a hundred thousand or more) Chinese and other Asian socialists and communists to fight for the Bolsheviks. However, this proved unnecessary because by October 1919, the Red Army (of the Bolsheviks) began to defeat White Movement (whom the Intervention forces support) throughout all of Russia whether it be European Russia, the Urals, western Siberia and the Zabaikal region and the Russian Far East. The Red Army drove out the last Intervention force, the Japanese in October 1922 from Russia and the Bolsheviks declared the "new" Soviet Union on Dec. 30, 1922.

== From Besieged to Betrayal: The Treachery of the Soviet State towards China ==
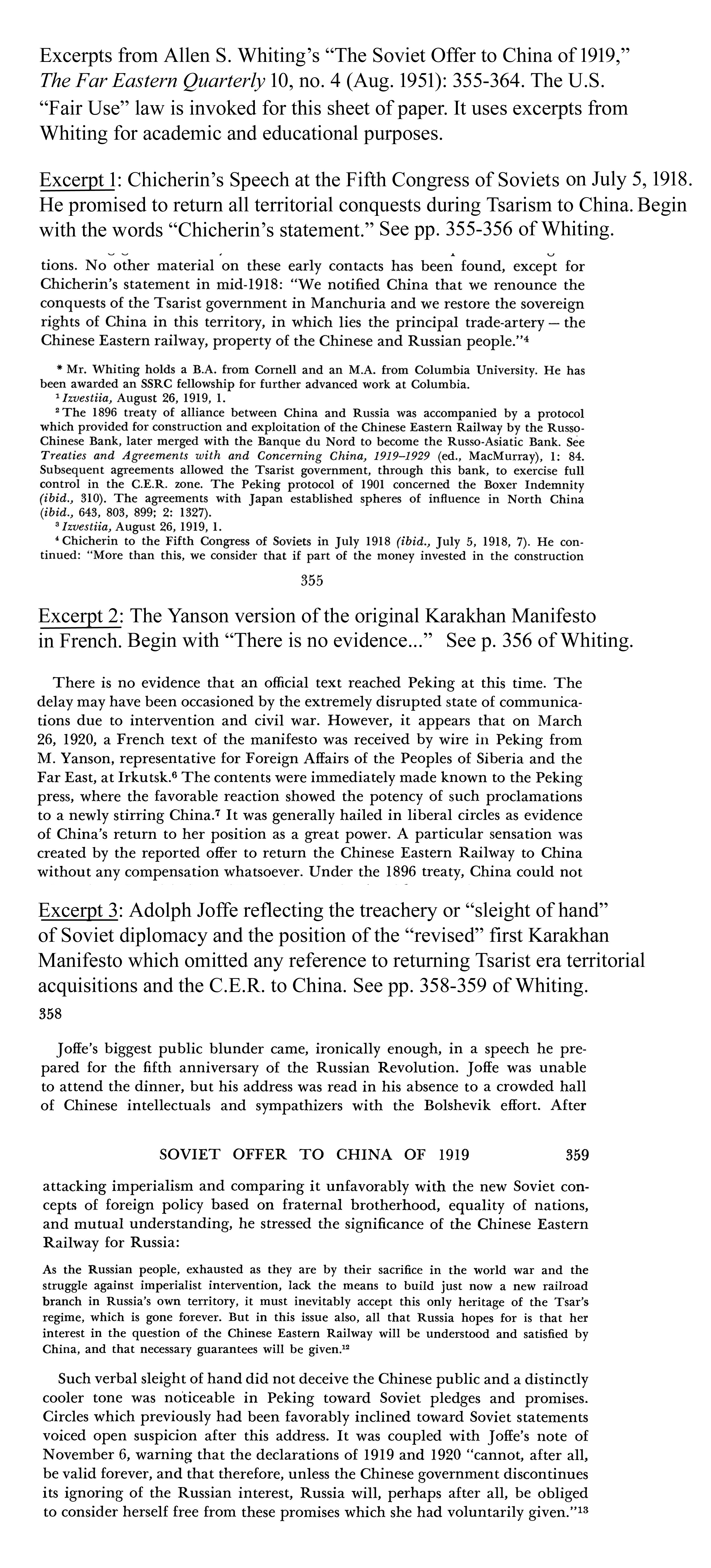
Key Excerpts such as Chicherin's Speech, The Yanson version of Manifesto, Joffe's Revisions

First, let us provide the historical background behind Lev Karakhan and his original manifesto of 1919 (which is not the "revised" Aug. 26, 1919 manifesto by the Soviets). On July 5, 1918, Georgii Chicherin, the head of the People's Commissariat of Foreign Affairs (and Karakhan's superior) made a speech to the Fifth Congress of the Soviets stating "We notified China that we renounce the conquests of the Tsarist government in Manchuria and we restore the sovereign rights of China in this territory, in which lies the principal trade-artery--the Chinese Eastern Railay, property of the Chinese and Russian people." This statement was made one year prior to the Karakhan Manifesto and states a return of the territories taken during Tsarism while declaring the CER to belong to both nations.

Lev Karakhan was the Deputy of the People's Commissariat for Foreign Affairs from March 1918 to May 1921. He was a close ally to Chicherin and served as his deputy. The original Karakhan Manifesto was written on July 25, 1919. This manifesto promised to return to the Chinese Eastern Railway and any lands taken by the Tsarist government to China. There are only two surviving copies of the original Karakhan Manifesto. The first was published by Vladimir Vilenskii, a commissar (official) with Sovnarkom in the Far East in 1919. and a second version in French sent by Monsieur Y.D. Yanson to the Bejing government on March 26, 1920. The Vilenskii reprint is featured above as the "Karakhan Manifesto" published by Whiting in his monograph, Soviet Policies in China, 1917-1924. Both copies of the original (Vilenskii's and Yanson's) republished the original Karakhan manifesto in its entirety. M. Yanson, was a Soviet representative of the People's Commissariat for Foreign Affairs for Eastern Siberia. Yanson was a regional commissar. However, on Aug. 26, 1919, the Soviet newspaper Izvestiia published a revised version of the Karakhan Manifesto without the promises to restore the Tsarist era territorial acquisitions nor the C.E.R. to China. The Bolsheviks then claimed that this was the original version of the manifesto and not a revised one. Millard's Review, a weekly journal published an English language translation of the Yanson "original" manifesto on June 5, 1920. Millard's Review specialized in news and reporting on Sino-Soviet diplomatic and political relations.

The Soviets may have hoped the offer of the railway would generate an enthusiastic response in Beijing, leading to a Sino-Soviet alliance against Japan. The Soviets in 1919 desired to win over China (the Beiyang government was in power in China) from siding with Japan. The Beiyang Government had been "pro-Japan" since 1915. Keep in mind, that Japan sent 74,200 soldiers to Russia as part of their Entente contingent. This was by far the largest foreign army (excluding that of the Czech Legion who were ex-prisoners of war) involved in the Russian Civil War. But by October 1919, the Red Army and the Soviets/Bolsheviks were on the offensive. They were retaking vast tracts of land that had earlier been lost to the various Entente/Interventionist forces, the White Army and other anti-Bolshevik forces. They were no longer in fear of losing Russia. As a matter of fact, by Nov.-Dec. 1919, they were winning the Civil War in every theater (European Russia, the Urals, Eastern Siberia and the Russian Far East. In any event, Russia's possession of former territories of China, including control of the Chinese Eastern Railway, was reaffirmed in a series of secret agreements made in 1924 and 1925.

A second Karakhan Manifesto was issued on Sept. 27, 1920 and both the first "revised" and second manifestos were sent officially to Beijing in February 1921. Neither of the two manifestos promised a return of lost Chinese territories from the 19th century nor the C.E. R. Both Karakhan Manifestos (first and second) continued to declare the Bolshevik's solidarity with China, and Chinese intellectuals and revolutionaries against imperialist powers. However, Allen S. Whiting noted that, "Such verbal sleight of hand did not deceive the Chinese public and a distinctly cooler tone was noticeable in Peking toward Soviet pledges and promises. Circles [in China] which previously had been favorably inclined toward Soviet statements voiced open suspicion after this address [Joffe's 1922 statement about the first and second Karakhan Manifestos]."

In 1922, Adolph Joffe was made the Soviet Ambassador to China. He came to China in 1922 and stated that the Yanson version of the Karakhan Manifesto (which promised the return of Tsarist era territories and the C.E.R.) was invalid, that only the revised version of the first manifesto was valid and that the Soviet and Russian peoples cannot build a new railroad. Thus, the USSR must retain the C.E.R. for their use. Joffe also stated (as Ambassador to China) that the First and Second Karakhan Manifestos were [paraphrasing] "simply a starting point for negotiations and carried no legal weight in and of themselves." Yanson who was a Soviet official himself did not repudiate the validity of the Yanson version of the First Karakhan Manifesto. He never denied its validity. The Yanson version in French also contained Karakhan's signature. This view was not shared by the Chinese. On Nov. 30, 1923, Lev Karakhan wrote to C.T. Wang denying that the original Karakhan Manifesto promised to return the C.E.R. In 1925, another Soviet official, V.P. Savvin wrote that the original Karakhan Manifesto of July 25, 1919 had been distorted by White Guardist and imperialist agents, that is, anti-Bolshevik forces. Therefore, the offers to return the C.E.R. and Tsarist territorial acquisitions were invalid per Savvin.

Adding further insult to injury, on April 26, 1922, as the USSR was detaching Mongolia from China proper and incorporating it as the USSR's first satellite state, Aleksandr Paikes told the Chinese government that [paraphrasing] although the Tsarist era treaties (Aigun and Beijing) had been abolished by the Karakhan Manifestos, the basis for the treaties had not. Thus, they were to be continued as Soviet treaties whether formally or informally.

The document "Key Excerpts" is from Whiting's article, "The Soviet Offer to China of 1919." All of the aforementioned information can be found in greater depth in Whiting's Soviet Policies in China, 1917-1924. Whiting dedicated his academic career to the inter-relations between China and the USSR. He and Dr. Bruce Elleman are two of the foremost experts on Soviet-Chinese relations in the 1920s and the Karakhan Manifestos. There are six primary academic monographs which cover the issue of Sino-Soviet relations, China's attempts to regain or negotiate for the territories and the Karakhan Manifestos. They are: one, Whiting's Soviet Policies in China, 1917–1924, two, Elleman's Diplomacy and Deception: The Secret History of Sino-Soviet Diplomatic Relations, 1917-1927, three, An's The Sino-Soviet Territorial Dispute, four, Wiegand's comparative work, Enduring Territorial Disputes: Strategies of Bargaining, Coercive Diplomacy and Settlement., five, Tsui's The Sino-Soviet border dispute in the 1970s. and finally, W.A. Douglas Jackson's The Russo-Chinese Borderlands: Zone of Peaceful Contact Or Potential Conflict?

== Question of continued validity ==
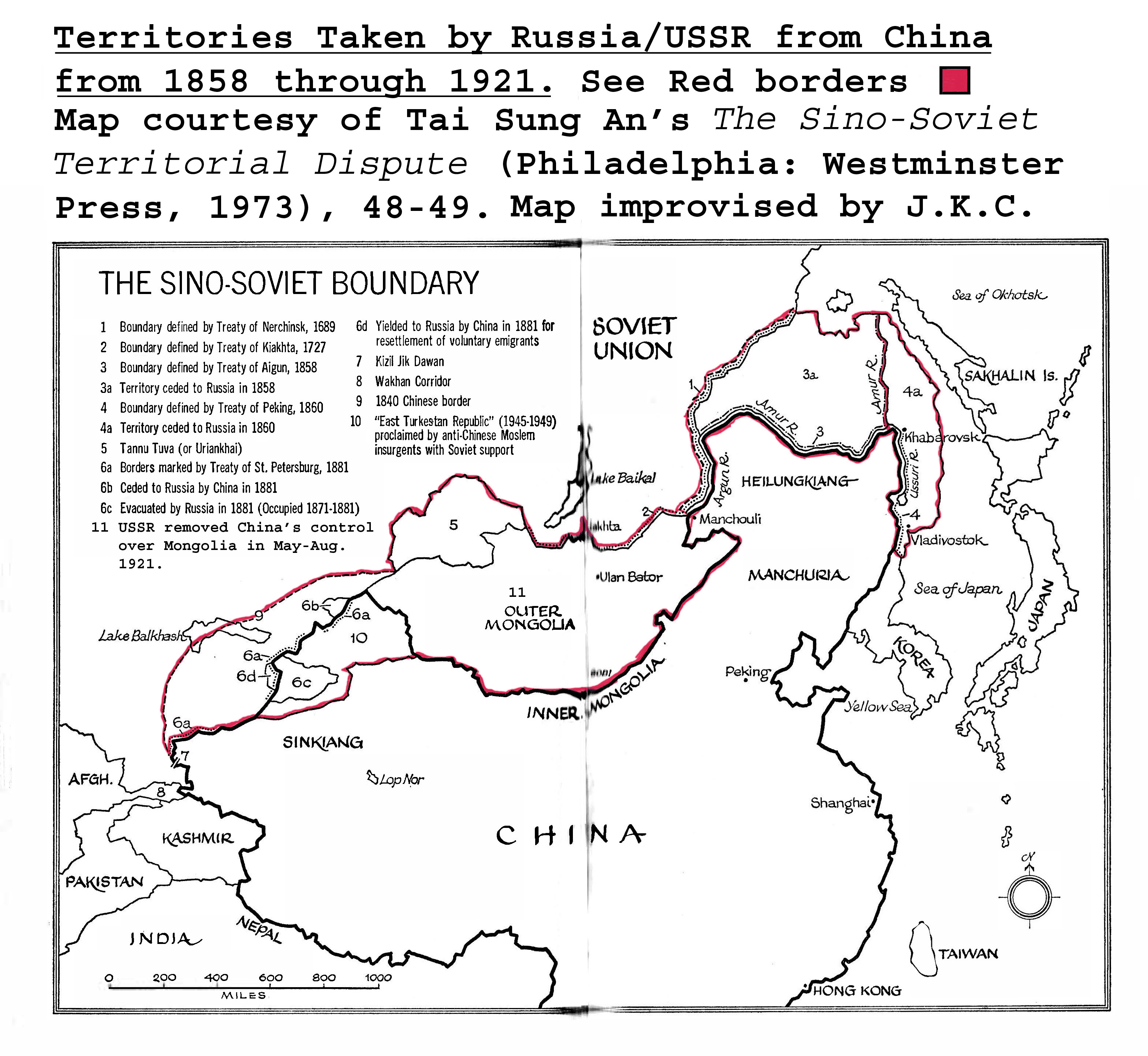
Map showing all of the territories that Imperial and Soviet Russia took from China from 1858 to 1921

After October 1922 and the end of the Russian Civil War, the USSR annulled the two Karakhan Manifestos. The current Russian Federation does not see them as valid. Taiwan (the Republic of China) does, while the People's Republic of China has yet to state an official position. The PRC did, however, redraw its map of the Russian Far East in February 2023, calling Vladivostok "Haishenwai" and Khabarovsk "Boli." These were the old Chinese names for both settlements. The Russians consider that the Russia-Border Treaties of 1991 and 2004 have set the Russian-Chinese borders where they stand on the current map.

Nevertheless, two American historians, Bruce A. Elleman and Jon K. Chang, believe that the Karakhan Manifestos are still valid and extant, as unilateral, legally binding declarations. They are not treaties nor accords which need to be signed by both parties. Furthermore, Elleman's Diplomacy and Deception states that the secret protocol reaffirming Russia's territorial claims in China which were acquired by Tsarist Russia "were not abolished, they were simply not enforced." The decision to accept or annul the Karakhan Manifestos would depend on future conferences and negotiations (pp. 100–102).

There are those who disagree, namely Sergey Radchenko, a scholar in international relations. When President Lai Ching-te of Taiwan made a quip (September 2, 2024) about China invading Russia to take back its "lost territories," Radchenko said that Lai was "seriously misguided." Radchenko then spoke for China saying "China fully recognizes Russia's sovereignty over these territories." The next day, September 3, Maria Zakharova, the spokeswoman for the Russian Foreign Ministry, issued a statement mirroring Radchenko's earlier remarks about the validity of China recovering its "lost territories".
