= Second Battle of Guangzhou =

1929 battle in China

Coordinates: 23°07′55″N 113°15′58″E

- Part of the Chiang-Gui War
Date	May 17–21, 1929
Location	Guangzhou, Guangdong
Result	Guangdong Army victory

Belligerents
Guangdong Army; Supported by: Nationalist government	New Guangxi clique

Commanders and leaders
Cai Tingkai	Bai Chongxi

Strength
	At least 1 Brigade

Casualties and losses
	1 Brigade commander captured

The Second Battle of Guangzhou was fought between the rival armies of the Liangguang region in Southern China as part of the internal conflicts within the Kuomintang leading up to the Central Plains War. The previous month, the New Guangxi clique had fought the Sichuan clique at the Battle of Yichang in Hubei. The forces of the New Guangxi clique attacked Guangzhou from both their home province of Guangxi as well as Jiangxi. Guangdong forces captured a brigade commander of the New Guangxi clique's army.

== Bibliography ==
- 中華民國國防大學編，《中國現代軍事史主要戰役表》
