= Siege of Guilin (1647) =

- Part of Ming-Qing transition
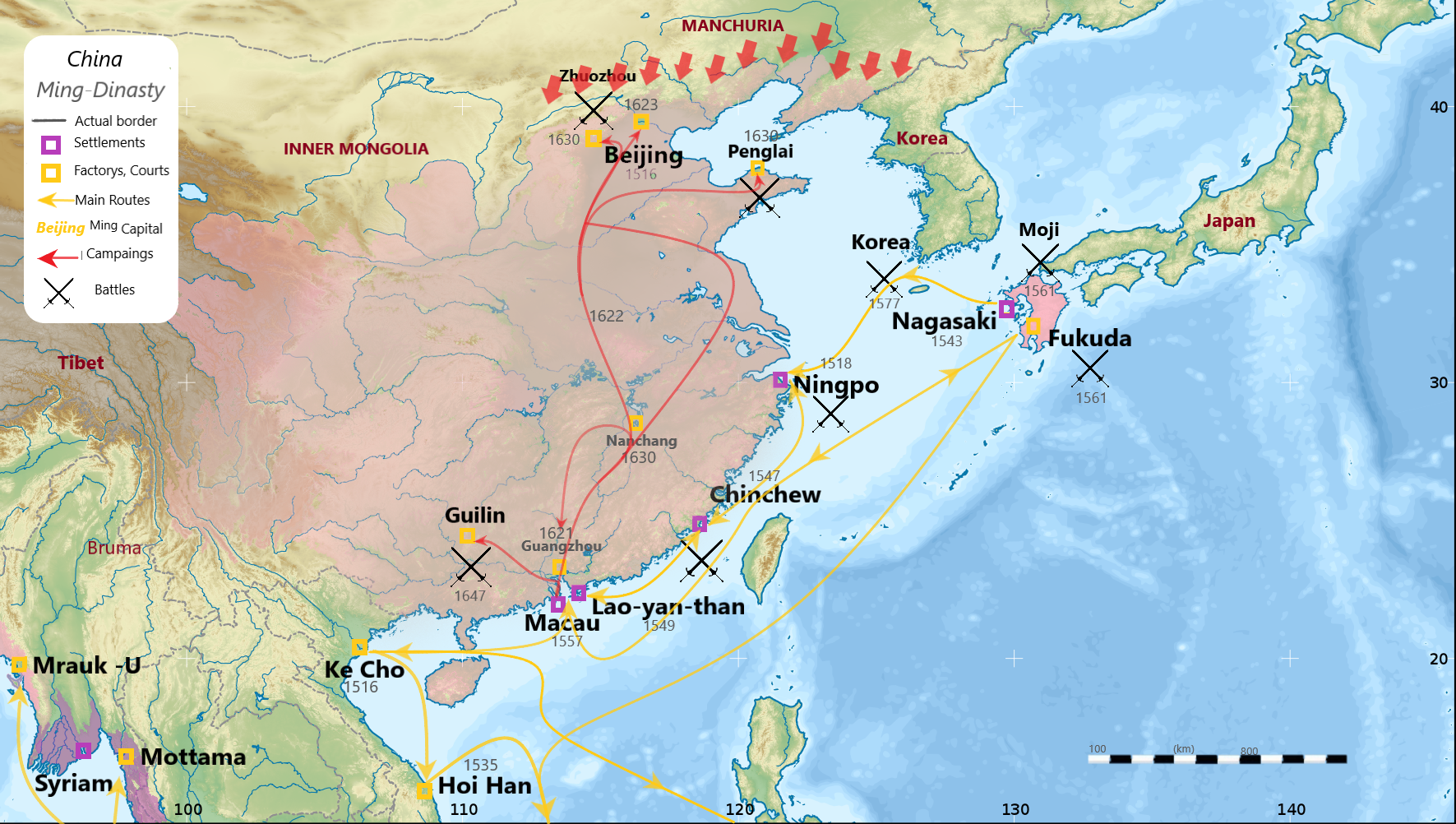
- Portuguese presence in China, with a map showing the location and date of the battle
Date	March or April – July 1647
Location	Guilin, China
Result	Ming–Portuguese victory

Belligerents
Southern Ming; Kingdom of Portugal	Qing dynasty

Commanders and leaders
Zhu Youlang; Qu Shiqi (governor); Jiao Hao; Nicolau Ferreira	Li Chengdong †; Kong Youde; Geng Zhongming; Shang Kexi

Strength
Hundreds (reinforced with 300 men)	Tens of thousands

Casualties and losses
Unknown	Thousands

The 1647 siege of Guilin (Chinese: 桂林之战) was a military conflict during the Ming-Qing transition between the forces of the Southern Ming dynasty, with the support of a Portuguese contingent from Macau, against the Manchu Qing forces.

== Background ==
In 1646, Nicolau Ferreira, with 300 men, joined the Ming pretender Zhu Youlang.

Zhu Youlang was the last claimant to the Ming throne, and, for a time, the most successful one. In 1646, Youlang led a rebellion and quickly took possession of the southern provinces of Guangdong and Guangxi. The Manchus responded by capturing Canton in January 1647. Forced to retreat, Youlang left to Guilin, the capital of Guangxi.

In 1647, Zhu Youlang, the King of Gui, ascended the throne in Zhaoqing, Guangdong, and became known as the Yongli Emperor of the Southern Ming Dynasty. Liu Yuansheng invested and moved to Guilin with the Yongli Emperor.

In February 1647, Zhu Youlang fled from Guangdong to Guilin and appointed Jiao Hao as the chief military officer and governor. Jiao Hao had previously guarded the city, and when a rebellion broke out, he connected with the soldiers outside, killed Yang Guowei, captured King Hengjia of Jingjiang, and was rewarded with the rank of deputy general and later the title of Prince Taishi and Zuo Governor.

== Siege ==
In March or April 1647, Li Chengdong began his initial military task of besieging the loyalist forces at Guilin, meanwhile Qu Shiqi led hundreds to defend the city. At the same time, Chen Bangyan and brigand Yu Long attacked Guangzhou, while bachelor Zhang Jiayu led an uprising in Dongguan. Viceroy Tong Yangjia, then in command in Guangzhou, urgently requested Li Chengdong to drop the siege at Guilin and rescue Guangzhou, and so the Manchu withdrew in July. Later Li Chengdong was unexpectedly killed by hundreds of loyal soldiers to Qu Shiqi and Jiao Hao in Guilin.

In May, Kong Youde, Geng Zhongming and Shang Kexi, who had surrendered to the Qing dynasty, led tens of thousands of troops to Guilin. Qu Shiqi went up the city wall, and Jiao Hao each defended half of it, and used the "western cannons" (Portuguese) to fight for a while. With a force of 300, Jiao Hao killed thousands of men and chased them for 20 miles.

By July, all the cities and counties in Guangxi occupied by the Qing army were recovered by Jiao Hao.

According to other sources, the Qing made at least two or three other attempts to besiege Guilin, all of which failed.

== Aftermath ==
Later, in Autumn 1648, after the baptism of Zhu Youlang's mother, wife, and heir, he appealed to assist Macau. According to contemporary accounts, the Portuguese dispatched another contingent of 300 soldiers, fully equipped with two mortars. Despite the previous victory, the Manchus massacred and recaptured Guangzhou, and Guilin fell a few days later, in November 1650.
