= Lev Karakhan =

Soviet diplomat (1889–1937)

- Լևոն Կարախանյան
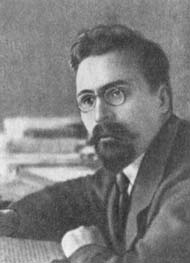
- Born: January 20, 1889; Tiflis, Tiflis Governorate, Russian Empire
- Died: September 20, 1937 (aged 48); Moscow, Russian SFSR, Soviet Union
- Citizenship: Russian Empire (1889–1917); Soviet Union (1917–1937)
- Occupation: Diplomat
- Years active: 1904–1937
- Political party: RSDLP (Mensheviks)(1904–1917); Russian Communist Party (1917–1937)
- Awards: Order of the Red Banner

Lev Mikhailovich Karakhan (Karakhanyan, Armenian: Լևոն Միքայելի Կարախանյան, Russian: Лев Михайлович Карахан; 20 January 1889 – 20 September 1937) was a Russian revolutionary and a Soviet diplomat. A member of the RSDLP from 1904, at first a Menshevik, he joined the Bolsheviks in May 1917.

== Early life ==
Lev Karakhan was born in Tiflis (Tbilisi), where his father, Mikhail Karakhanyan worked as a barrister. After graduating from Real school in Tiflis, he worked as a tutor and reporter. His family later moved to Harbin, where, in 1904, he joined the Menshevik wing of the Russian Social Democratic Labour Party. He studied law at St Petersburg University in from 1910, but did not graduate. In 1912, he became involved in the trade unions, and in 1913, he joined the Mezhraiontsy - RSDLP members who were neither Bolsheviks nor Mensheviks. After the outbreak of war, in 1914, he organised an illegal printing house, and helped produce radical magazine, and the illegal newspaper, Vpered. In 1915, he was arrested as he was leaving the printing press, in Chubarov Lane, but managed to chew and swallow a list he was carrying of party members. He was deported to Tomsk, where he enrolled in Tomsk University, until he was expelled in May 1917 for failing to pay his fees. He also worked illegally for the Irkutsk party organisation.

In summer 1917, he returned to St Petersburg and was elected to the district Duma. He joined the Bolsheviks (later the All-Russian Communist Party) With the other members of the Mezhraiontsy, who were now led by Leon Trotsky. During the Bolshevik Revolution he was member of the Revolutionary Military Council.

== Diplomatic career ==
From November 1917 to March 1918, during the Brest-Litovsk peace talks that ended the war between Russia and Germany, Karakhan acted as secretary to each of the three successive Soviet delegations, headed respectively by Adolph Joffe, Trotsky, and Grigory Sokolnikov. In March 1918, Karakhan was appointed Deputy People's Commissar for Foreign Affairs, and head of the Eastern Department.

In 1919, he issued a statement concerning relations with China called the Karakhan Manifesto, which promised to put an end to the "robber invasion of Manchuria and Siberia" to renounce the 'unequal treaties' signed by Russia and China in 1858 and 1860, and to return to China all of "conquests made by the Tsarist government which deprived China of Manchuria". Some, including William Lai, President of Taiwan believe that the promises made in the manifesto were never honoured, either by the USSR or the Russian Federation.

In August 1919, Joseph Stalin, who was then People's Commissar for Nationalities, objected that Karakhan's presence in that role was creating problems with establishing Soviet rule in Azerbaijan, and weakening relations with Turkey, and would create worse problems as the Red Army advanced through Turkestan, because Karakhan was an Armenian "towards whom Muslims in general, and Turks in particular, have the utmost distrust." (Stalin was referring to the Armenian resistance to Turkish rule during the 1914–18, which gave rise to the Armenian genocide

On May 30, 1921, a month after the formal ratification of Treaty of Riga, which ended the Polish–Soviet War Karakhan was posted to Poland as the first plenipotentiary representative of the RSFSR. He was recalled on 9 October 1922

On August 8, 1923, he was appointed head of the Soviet delegation to China, where his task was to establish diplomatic relations with the Beiyang government in Beijing.

On 26 September 1926, Karakhan was recalled to Moscow to take up his previous post as Deputy People's Commissar for Foreign Affairs.

During the 1920s, there was constant conflict between the People's Commissar, Georgy Chicherin and his senior deputy Maxim Litvinov. Chicherin regarded Karakhan as his ally in this decade long feud, and felt undermined when Karakhan was posted abroad. In November 1929, when Chicherin was in Berlin for medical treatment, and there were fears in Moscow that he might defect, Karakhan was sent to Berlin to persuade him to return to Moscow, Chicherin returned, but resigned and was replaced by Litvinov.

On 29 June 1934, Karakhan was appointed USSR plenipotentiary in Turkey. He is credited with suggesting that an international conference should be held to regulate the Dardanelles, to prevent their being taken over by Nazi Germany - though the resulting Montreux Convention was signed on the USSR's behalf, in July 1936, by Litvinov.

== Personality ==
Karakhan was known for his dandyish appearance; Karl Radek is quoted as having "maliciously described" him as "the Ass of Classical Beauty", while a junior colleague, Alexander Barmine, wrote that "Our young staff gave him unstinted admiration, amazed that humanity could produce such perfection. He had a purity of profile such as is seen, as a rule, only on ancient coins." The British diplomat Robert Bruce Lockhart, who met Karakhan in 1918, described him as:

An Armenian with dark, waving hair and a well-trimmed beard, he was the adonis of the Bolshevik Party. His manners were perfect. He was an excellent judge of a cigar. I never saw him in a bad temper, and during the whole period of our contact, and even when I was being denounced as a spy and an assassin by his colleagues, I never heard an unpleasant word from his lips. This is not to imply that he was a saint. He had all the guile and craft of his race. Diplomacy was his proper sphere.

He was also a music lover. The composer, Sergei Prokofiev, met Karakhan in February 1927, and noted in his diary:

Karakhan informed me that in China he had a Duo-Art piano player and a number of rolls made by me, and that in the evening, while resting from his labours, he enjoyed listening to them. Awfully touching: Karakhan, while implanting revolutionary ideas in China, finds refreshment and renewed strength in the sound of my music."

== Arrest and execution ==
On May 3, 1937, during the Great Purge, Karakhan was recalled to Moscow, on the pretext that he was to be appointed Ambassador to the USA, and arrested. He was reputedly severely tortured. On 2 June, while in the hands of the NKVD, he 'confessed' that he been part of a conspiracy with Marshal Tukhachevsky and other Red Army commanders, who were plotting a war with Nazi Germany, that the Soviet Union would lose. The officers he named were shot nine days later. On 20 December 1937, it was announced in Pravda that he was one of a group of 'spies, bourgeois nationalist and terrorists', headed by Avel Yenukidze, who had been tried on 16 December, had confessed and been executed. When the archives were opened after the collapse of the Soviet Union, it emerged that the date was false. Karakhan was actually sentenced to death by the Military Collegium of the Supreme Court on September 20, 1937, and was shot on the same day.

He was mentioned repeatedly during the last of the Moscow show trials, in March 1938, when it was alleged that he was a German spy, who acted as a liaison between the Nazis and anti-soviet conspirators. The main defendants, Nikolai Bukharin and Alexei Rykov, denied knowing that he was a spy. The entire trial was officially discredited in 1988, and the defendants were posthumously cleared of the charges.

Karakhan was posthumously rehabilitated in December 1956.

== Family ==
Karakhan was officially twice married. He met Klavdia Yefremovna Manayeva in Vladivostok in 1908, when she was 18, and married her in 1909. They had a son, Mikhail. They separated in November 1918, when Karakhan was expelled from Switzerland, where he was on a failed mission to establish diplomatic relations, and she stayed abroad to care for their son's health.

In 1918, he married the actress Vera Viktorovna Dzheneyev (1890-1972), and adopted her daughter, Vera. They had two children: Yuri, who died during the 1941-45 war, and Irina (1926-2019), who was born in Beijing, became a sculptor, and died in July 2019, leaving two daughters.

His third wife (in civil marriage), Marina Timofeyevna Semyonova, the Soviet ballet dancer, died in 2010, aged 102.
