= Li Guangxi =

Chinese actor and tenor (1929–2022)

- 李光曦
- Born: 15 November 1929; Tianjin, China
- Died: 13 March 2022 (aged 92); Beijing, China
- Education: Central Experimental Opera and Dance Theatre
- Occupation: Singer
- Years active: 1956–2021
- Organization(s): Chinese Opera and Dance Theatre
- Spouse: Wang Ziwei (m. 1957)
- Children: Three

Chinese name
- Chinese: 李光曦
Transcriptions
Standard Mandarin
- Hanyu Pinyin: Lǐ Guāngxī

Li Guangxi
- Chinese: 李光羲
Transcriptions
Standard Mandarin
- Hanyu Pinyin: Lǐ Guāngxī

Li Guangxi (Chinese: 李光曦 or Chinese: 李光羲; 15 November 1929 – 13 March 2022) was a Chinese national-level actor and one of China's most outstanding tenors.

== Early life and education ==
Li was born in Tianjin, China in 1929, the fourth of eight children. His father was a senior staff at Kailuan Mining Bureau (开滦矿务局). In his early teens, he expressed interest in singing. When he was in high school, his father died of overwork. In order to make a living, he went to work in the company where his father had worked. In 1954, he was accepted to the Central Experimental Opera and Dance Theatre.

== Career ==
In 1956, Li acted as Arman in La traviata, the first classical opera in China under the leadership of Zhou Enlai. He received positive reviews for the role. At the end of 1957, he became a sent-down youth in the Down to the Countryside Movement. He worked in Funing County, Hebei Province. In 1958, Zhou Enlai was going to visit the Soviet Union. He was transferred back to Beijing and accompanied Zhou Enlai on the visit. He performed in Eugene Onegin at the Bolshoi Theatre. His wonderful performance won the praise of Nikita Khrushchev. In 1969, during the Cultural Revolution, the Central Experimental Opera and Dance Theatre was disbanded and Li forced to work in the fields in the suburb of Tianjin. In 1972, after a coup in Cambodia, Norodom Sihanouk stayed in Beijing. Norodom Sihanouk liked to compose music and wanted to invite Chinese singers to sing. After receiving instructions from Zhou Enlai, the relevant departments transferred Li from Tianjin's countryside to Beijing. At Sihanouk's birthday party, he sang a few songs composed by Sihanouk and won the praise of Sihanouk. Subsequently, the China National Radio invited him to record two songs, "Beijing Yangge" and "The Love's Voyage", which was welcomed by the national audience. In 1978, he sang "The Toasting Song," written to commentate the end of the Cultural Revolution, and it sold up to a million albums.

In 1983, he was diagnosed with a laryngeal muscle disorder and did not return to the stage until 1986.

In 2015 and 2019, he participated in the Spring Festival Gala held by China Central Television.

== Personal life ==
Li met his future wife Wang Ziwei (王紫薇) in 1953, when they rehearsed in Tianjin Chorus Team. They married on 27 December 1957. The couple has three daughters.

Li died from a stroke at Beijing Chaoyang Hospital on 13 March 2022, at the age of 92.

== Operas ==
- La traviata
- Eugene Onegin

== Singles ==
- "Beijing Songge" (北京颂歌)
- "The Love's Voyage" (爱的远航)
- "The Toast Song" (祝酒歌)
- "When Will We Meet Again?" (何日再相会)
- "Ode to Yanan" (延安颂)
- "Waves of Gulangyu" (鼓浪屿之波)
