= Zeng Yi (virologist) =

Chinese virologist (1929–2020)

- 曾毅
- Born: March 8, 1929; Jiexi County, Guangdong, China
- Died: July 13, 2020 (aged 91); Beijing, China
- Education: Shanghai Medical College
- Scientific career
- Fields: Virology
- Workplaces: Chinese Center for Disease Control and Prevention

Zeng Yi (Chinese: 曾毅; pinyin: Zēng Yì; March 8, 1929 – July 13, 2020) was a Chinese virologist. He was a professor at Beijing University of Technology and a researcher at Chinese Center for Disease Control and Prevention.

== Biography ==
Zeng was born in Wujingfu Township (now Wujingfu Town) of Jiexi County, Guangdong, on March 8, 1929. His father was a small merchant. He attended Wujingfu Middle School. In 1943 he entered Dongshan High School (东山中学). After graduating from Shanghai Medical College in 1952, he joined the Department of Microbiology, Guangzhou Zhongshan Medical College. In 1956, he was transferred to the Virus Laboratory of Department of Microbiology, Beijing Central Institute of Health. In 1974 he became a visiting research fellow at the University of Glasgow. He returned to China in 1975 and that same year joined the Chinese Academy of Medical Sciences and Chinese Academy of Preventive Medicine. In 1981 he became deputy director of the Institute of Virology, Chinese Academy of Preventive Medicine, rising to director in December 1983. He was promoted again to become vice-president of Chinese Academy of Preventive Medicine in 1984, and then president, in 1992. From 1986 to 1987 he was a visiting research fellow at the French National Centre for Scientific Research. In October 2002, he became the founding dean of the College of Life Science and Bioengineering of Beijing University of Technology. Zeng Yi died of illness in Beijing on July 13, 2020, at the age of 91.

== Contributions ==
Since 1984, Zeng had carried out research on HIV and AIDS. In 1987, he isolated the first HIV-1 strain and established a rapid HIV diagnosis method.

== Honours and awards ==
- 1993 Member of the Chinese Academy of Sciences
- 1993 Foreign Academician of the Russian Academy of Medical Sciences
- 2003 Foreign Academician of the French Academy of Medical Sciences
- 2006 Award on Outstanding Contribution on AIDS Prevention and Control from BritishBarry & Martin's Trust
- 2012 Lifetime Achievement Award for Public Health from School of Medicine, University of Maryland
- 2013 Second Class of Chinese Medical Science Prize
