= First Battle of Guilin =

- Part of the Chiang-Gui War
Date	May 15, 1929
Location	Guilin, northern Guangxi
Result	Guangxi clique victory
Territorial changes	Guangxi clique captures Guilin

Belligerents
Hunan army Supported by: Nationalist government	New Guangxi clique

Strength
4th Route Army	

The First Battle of Guilin took place on May 15, 1929, in the northern part of Guangxi, China. It was one of the civil war battles that took place inside the National Revolutionary Army. The warring parties in Guilin battle, one side is the Fourth Army of the Xiang Army, and the other is the Army of the New Guangxi Clique. On the same day, the New Guangxi clique attacked the Guangdong Army at Huizhou in eastern Guangdong.
