= Sino-Soviet relations from 1969 to 1991 =

Historical bilateral relations

Relations between the People's Republic of China and the Soviet Union underwent significant change from 1969 to 1991, from open conflict to bitter détente to diplomatic partners by 1989. Relations between the Soviet Union (USSR) and Chinese Communist Party (CCP) dated back to the founding of the CCP in Shanghai in 1921, a meeting conducted under the supervision of the Communist International. The Soviets remained cautious partners with the rising CCP throughout the 22 years of the Chinese Civil War, and the USSR was the first nation to recognize the People's Republic of China in 1949. The following year saw the signing of the Sino-Soviet Treaty and founding of the Sino-Soviet alliance as well as the beginning of a decade of economic cooperation between the two nations.

Despite transfers of aid and raw materials between the nations, by 1956 this once warm friendship had cooled, and the Sino-Soviet split began. In 1960, the Soviet Union withdrew all economic advisors from the PRC, and relations became confrontational in political, economic, military and ideological arenas. After years of border incursions by both parties, 1969 saw the Sino-Soviet border conflict which nearly boiled over into a nuclear exchange.

After the Sino-Soviet border conflicts of 1969, Sino-Soviet relations were marked by years of military and political tensions. Even after the death of Mao Zedong in 1976, these two former allies remained locked in a miniature cold war, consumed by ideological, political and economic differences. However, relations began to improve in the late 1970s with a gradual de-escalation of military tensions and a move towards bilateral relations. After years of negotiations, full bilateral relations resumed in May 1989 in the midst of the 1989 Tiananmen Square protests and massacre. Warmer bilateral relations and mutual understanding would characterize the last two years of the Sino-Soviet relationship, up until the dissolution of the Soviet Union in December, 1991.

"In the 1950s the Soviet Union was "big brother," whose example should be followed. Through almost the entire two decades of the 1960s and 1970s, the Soviet Union became synonymous with "revisionism," the dreaded fate that China must avoid at all costs. Finally, in the 1980s, such extremes were avoided. The Soviet Union came to represent the common starting point for socialism, from which China and other socialist countries (the Soviet Union included) must shift, in steps, through carefully planned reforms." - Gilbert Rozman

The entire Sino-Soviet relationship was a roller coaster of events, from close alliance to nuclear showdown, but by the 1980s common approaches to reform enabled the resumption of diplomatic relations and extensive trade. These events spanned multiple generations of political leadership; Mao Zedong, Hua Guofeng and Deng Xiaoping led China, while Joseph Stalin, Nikita Khrushchev, Leonid Brezhnev, Yuri Andropov, Konstantin Chernenko, and Mikhail Gorbachev led the Soviet Union. Despite numerous domestic and foreign concerns, each generation of leadership devoted significant time and resources to the Sino-Soviet relationship, a relationship bound by political, economic, geographical, and ideological considerations.

== Sino-Soviet Relations 1949 - 1969 ==
=== Sino-Soviet Alliance ===
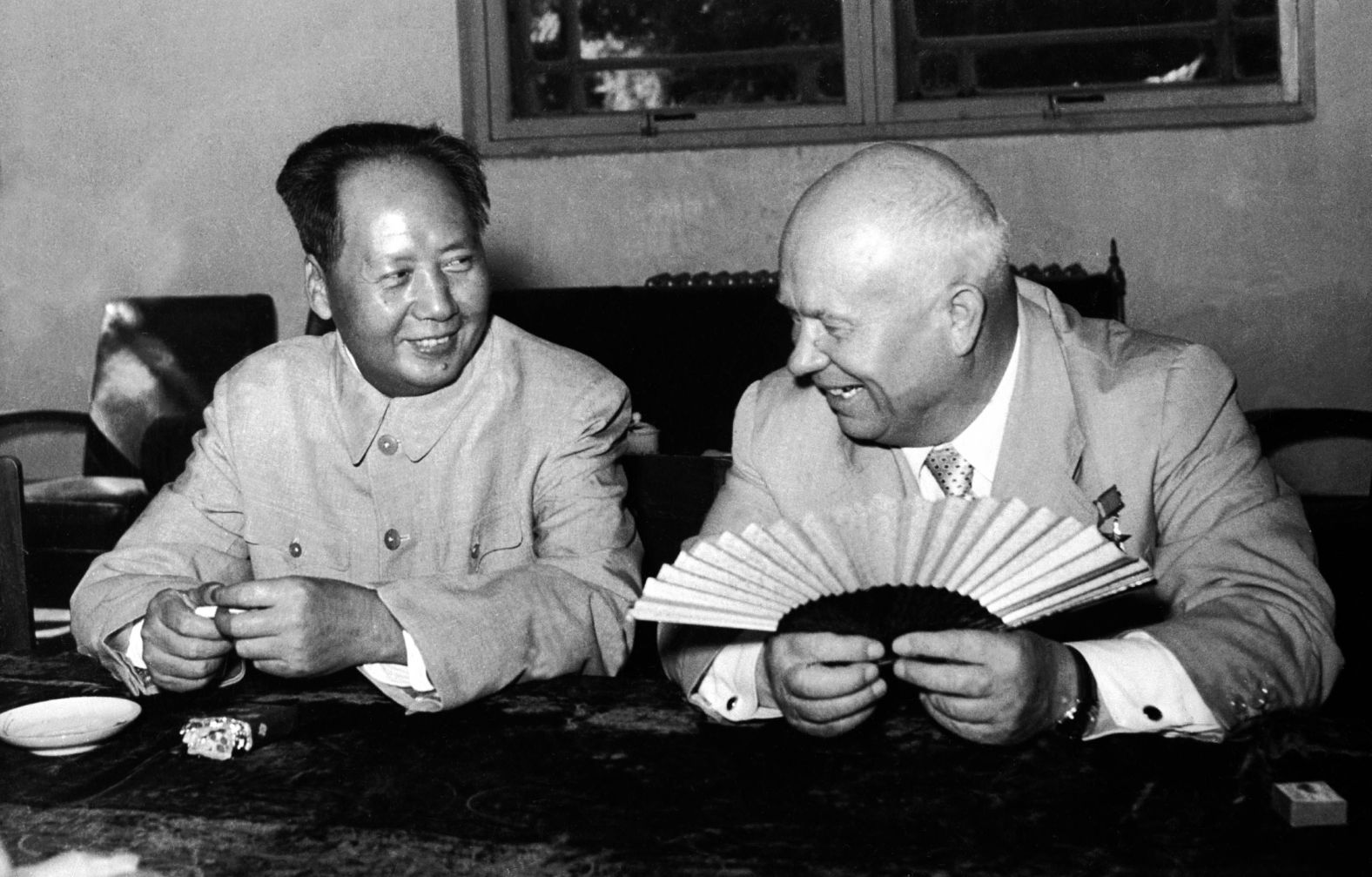
Mao Zedong and Nikita Khrushchev

The Sino-Soviet Alliance began with the signing of the new Sino-Soviet Treaty of Friendship, Alliance and Mutual Assistance on February 14, 1950. Following the signing of this treaty, the USSR advanced $300 million in development loans to the PRC and sent nearly 10,000 Soviet technical advisors to work in China. Over the next decade, extensive technological transfer and development assistance drew the two countries close together, while China firmly allied with the Soviet Union in the Cold War.

=== Sino-Soviet split ===
However, for numerous reasons, the Sino-Soviet alliance weakened in the late 1950s, and the Soviet Union withdrew all economic aid in August 1960. The Sino-Soviet split began once minor political, economic, geographic and ideological issues became major bilateral diplomatic concerns.

== Sino-Soviet Border War of 1969 ==
=== Military Build-up ===
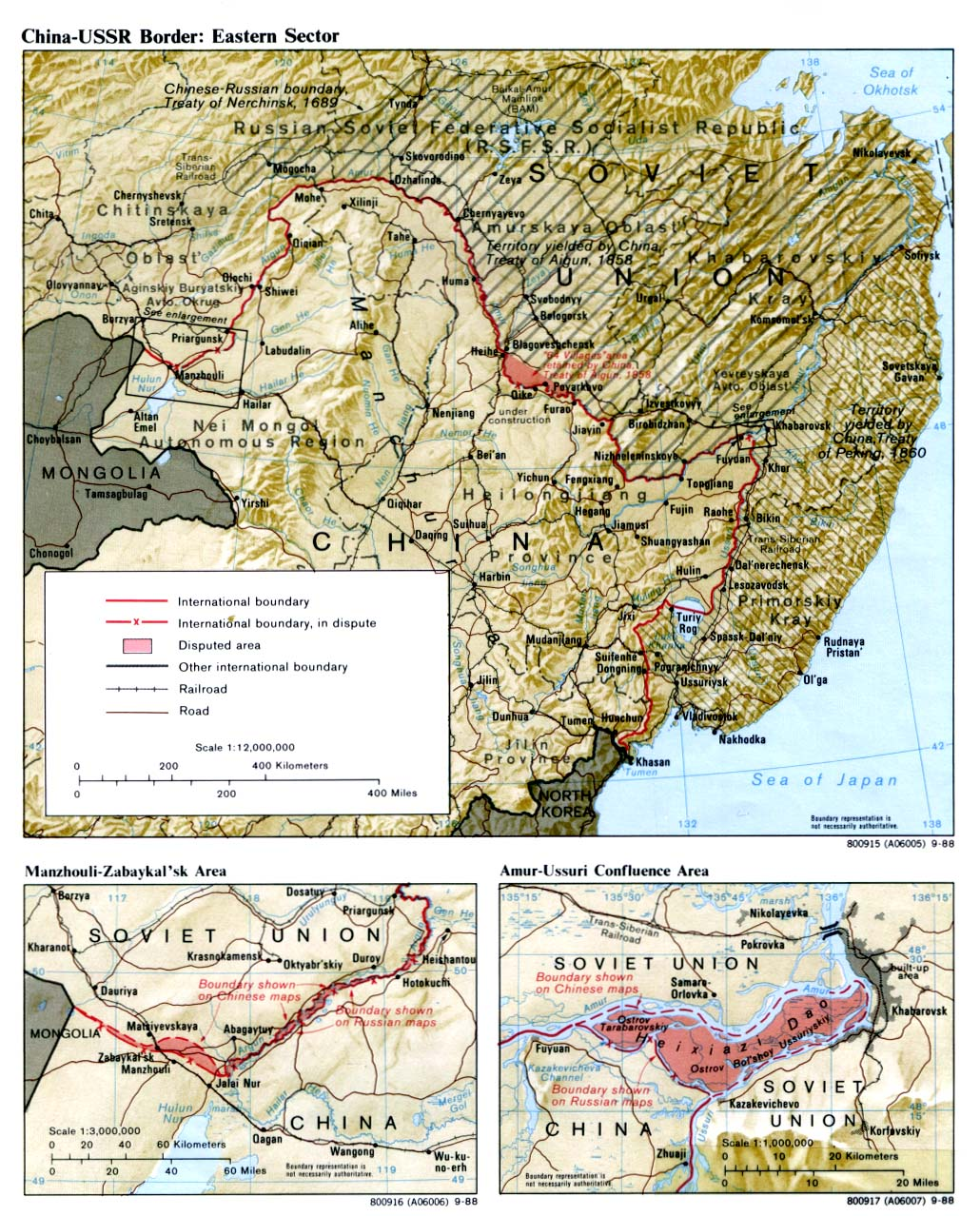
Disputed sections of the border between China and Russia before the final border agreement of 2004.

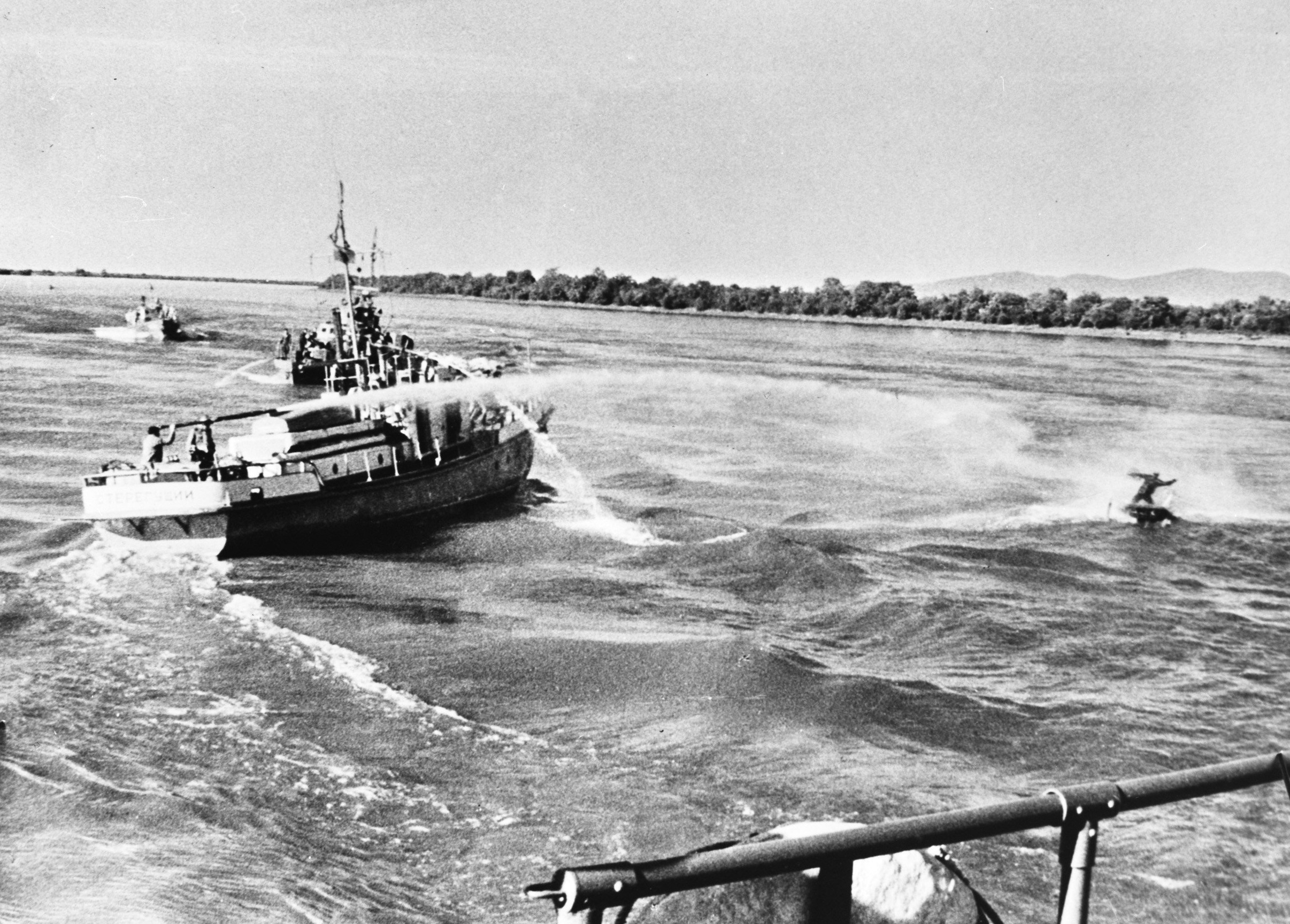
A Soviet ship using a water cannon against a Chinese fisherman on the Ussuri River on 6 May 1969

With the intensification of the Sino-Soviet Split, both nations deployed troops to the shared border, which stretched from North Korea to Central Asia. However, for the first part of the Sino-Soviet confrontation, the Mongolian People's Republic, a Soviet satellite since 1921, remained relatively neutral, and facilitated continued trade between the USSR and PRC. This changed with the signing of "The Treaty of Friendship, Cooperation and Mutual Assistance between the USSR and the Mongolian People's Republic" which superseded previous agreements of economic cooperation between the allied communist nations. The treaty, signed in Ulaanbaatar on January 15, 1966, by Soviet leader Leonid Brezhnev and Mongolian Prime Minister Yumjaagiin Tsedenbal, allowed the Soviet Union to station troops in Mongolia to ensure mutual defense. While the Soviet Army had previously operated in Mongolia, this was the first time that troops would be based in the independent nation. By 1967, the Soviet Union had deployed armored units and mechanized troops as well as ballistic missiles inside Mongolia and along the Chinese border. Border incidents and clashes continued to increase with 4,189 border crossing incidents between 1964 and 1969. The border conflict grew worse as each side moved more troops into the borderlands, and tensions in Moscow and Beijing rose to a breaking point. These developments along the northern border put Mao into a potential two front war, what Mao called "[A] new historical epoch of combating both U.S. imperialism and Soviet revisionism" in a letter to Enver Hoxha in September 1968. This letter, reprinted in the People's Daily, September 19, 1968, illustrated the brewing potential for a trilateral nuclear war.

=== Two Front Border Conflict (February - August 1969) ===
In this environment of nuclear showmanship and military tensions, the Chinese side made the first move. In 1969, the Chinese People's Liberation Army (PLA) attacked Soviet Border Guards stationed on Zhenbao Island in the Ussuri River, claiming the island for China. In repeated attacks and counterattacks up to 250 Chinese soldiers and 58 Soviet soldiers were killed. In the aftermath, both sides withdrew leaving the island as no-mans-land subject to frequent artillery barrages. The PLA argued that such attacks would not lead to a wider war with the Soviet Union, but China's leadership still prepared for war. The Soviet Union responded with thinly veiled threats of nuclear war if attacked again and counter-attacked on the western border. Minor clashes continued throughout the summer. On August 13, 1969, the Soviet Army invaded Yumin County in Xinjiang, eliminating the PLA platoon in the area. In addition, the Soviets transferred strategic nuclear bombers to airbases in the Russian Far East within striking distance of Manchurian nuclear facilities.

What had started as a border skirmish threatened to become a two front nuclear war. The PRC reacted by further preparing for war along the borderlands, while also seeking to reduce tensions in a high-level meeting with Soviet leaders. Premiers Alexei Kosygin and Zhou Enlai met at the Beijing Airport on September 11, 1969, and through a hurried series of meetings attempted to carefully negotiate a step-back from the brink of war. Further letters between the two premiers sought to de-escalate tensions but neither side withdrew troops from the border. However, the sides agreed to meet on October 20 in Beijing to solve the border-dispute diplomatically.

Mao Zedong and Lin Biao feared that the Soviet negotiations were a trick, a ploy to draw off Chinese troops while the Soviets would attack with ground and nuclear forces. Under orders from Mao, Lin Biao put the PLA strategic forces on war-readiness in full preparation for a nuclear war with the Soviet Union. What had begun as a diplomatic attempt to calm tensions, instead resulted in nuclear brinkmanship. With the nation on full alert, civilian and military authorities began to prepare for total war, under the premise that the arrival of a Soviet border negotiations team would be a ruse for an all-out nuclear strike. Yet, no strike came; on October 20, the Soviet diplomats arrived and border tensions settled for the time being.

== Tensions and Sino-American Relations 1969 - 1978 ==
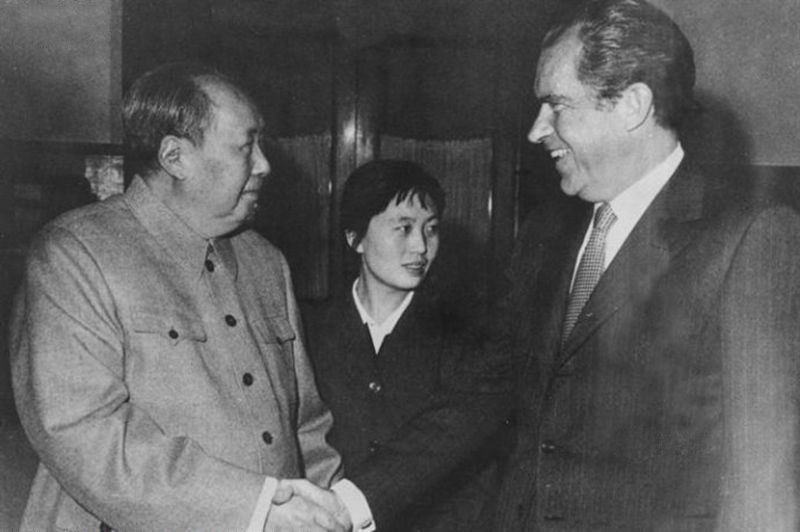
President Richard Nixon meets Chairman Mao Zedong, 1972

Sino-US rapprochement, a major break with previous foreign policies seeking to create a new balance of power in East Asia, greatly affected the Sino-Soviet relationship. Threatened by the potential of a crippling Soviet attack, China turned to the United States. While visiting China, American President Richard Nixon and National Security Advisor Henry Kissinger worked to allay Chinese fears of a joint US-Soviet attack and instead promote ties with China that would undermine the Soviet Union. Li Danhui and Xia Yafeng argue that Mao Zedong's ideological shift toward Sino-US relations was heavily influenced by the continuing threat of the USSR. Pivoting away from military confrontation, Mao declared a policy of "opposing the Soviet Union, irrespective of ideological position." This opened the door for continued cooperation and negotiation with the United States and cooperation balancing against Soviet power in East Asia. According to historian Li Danhui, "after the Zhenbao Island Incident in March 1969, the Sino-Soviet state-to-state relationship was on the brink of war. This prompted Mao to attempt a new policy of aligning with the United States to oppose the Soviet Union."

In the midst of Sino-American reproachment in 1972, the Sino-Soviet border continued to be heavily fortified, with nearly 1 million Soviet troops, armed with tanks, airplanes, artillery and backed by ballistic missiles. The Soviet Army faced approximately 1.5 million troops consisting of the PLA and People's Militia. The border tensions increased from 1973 through 1976, as both sides sought political victories while also continuing to militarize the border. Brezhnev spoke of China's failure to accept peaceful coexistence between the two nations, while the PRC continued to view the Soviet Union as an existential threat. The presence of the Soviet Navy in the Indian and Pacific oceans as well as well-armed troops across the length of the border reinforced a view of Soviet encirclement.

The death of Mao in September 1976 brought no immediate changes in the Sino-Soviet conflict, although each side had significantly reduced the number of troops stationed along the border. Brezhnev attempted to congratulate Hua Guofeng in October 1976, and was strongly rebuffed with a reinforcement of the late chairman's anti-Soviet rhetoric. In 1976, each side had approximately 300,000 soldiers deployed on the border, while the Soviet troops were backed by airpower and strategic forces. In 1978, the Soviets began deploying SS-20 missiles throughout the Far East, allowing them to strike any target in the PRC. In addition, large military exercises were performed in both Mongolia and Siberia, specifically modelling different scenarios of a Sino-Soviet war.

== Sino-Vietnam War 1979 ==
The Sino-Soviet Treaty lapsed in February 1979, and Deng Xiaoping announced that China would not attempt to renew the treaty provisions. The stationing of Soviet naval vessels throughout unified Socialist Vietnam gave further evidence of Soviet attempts to encircle the PRC. The increased Soviet presence in the Gulf of Tonkin raised tensions further.

In the midst of these worries, Vietnam invaded Cambodia, toppling the Chinese-backed Khmer Rouge. In response, China invaded northern Vietnam on February 17, and occupied a small area for a month. Declaring that China had realized its objective of "punishing Vietnamese and Soviet hegemony," the PLA withdrew in March 1979, ending the brief third Indochina War.

== Resumed Diplomacy 1979 - 1989 ==
After China's withdrawal from Vietnam, Sino-Soviet relations remained locked in tense military confrontation along the border, while diplomatic relations remained frozen. While the Soviet Union continued to supply and support the Vietnamese government in Cambodia, China remained opposed to all Soviet involvement in Southeast Asia; the regime continued to lambaste Soviet and Vietnamese "regional hegemony." Minor skirmishes continued along the southern border with Vietnam and the northern border remained heavily militarized. Historian Péter Vámos estimates that "about one fourth of Soviet ground forces and one third of its air force were stationed along or in the region of the Sino-Soviet border" in the early 1980s. Many of these units were stationed in the nominally independent People's Republic of Mongolia, as per the 1980 Soviet-Mongolian Mutual Defense treaty. The massive troop build-up along the border into the 1980s led to an imbalance of military power; the Chinese remained overwhelmed by the Soviet show of force. Meanwhile, the Soviet treaty with Vietnam allowed Soviet troops and the use of former American naval bases along the Vietnamese coast. The presence of the Soviet Navy and Air Force in its southern neighbor further enforced the feeling of encirclement.

For China, the instability on the northern border was increasingly seen as an unnecessary threat to the regime's existence and a thorn in the side of the reform and opening up. According to Gilbert Rozman, the rise of Deng Xiaoping and Chen Yun meant "the leftist line of opposing most post-Stalin reforms in the Soviet Union could now be replaced by appreciation for reforms in a socialist system." The post-Stalinist Soviet Union was no longer seen as a revisionist empire but instead a potential trade partner in economic reform. This ideological turn brought about a political and diplomatic shift, as China tentatively reached out to the USSR.

"Having normalized its relations with the United States, for the purpose of providing a peaceful environment, Deng also sought improved relations with the Soviet Union. The Chinese had good reasons to seek normalization with the Soviet Union. The Sino-Soviet conflict remained a destabilizing factor for China. With the border issue unsettled and Soviet military deployments in Siberia and Mongolia, the Soviet Union was perceived as the gravest threat to China's security." - Gilbert Rozman

Getting to the negotiating table proved troublesome. In September 1979, the parties began meeting, but failed to agree on what issues should be covered. The USSR sought to focus on bilateral relations between the two nuclear powers, while the PRC was concerned with current Soviet engagements in neighboring countries, specifically Vietnam and Mongolia; the PRC remained worried about the potential of Soviet military encirclement. While the Soviet Union sought to establish bilateral diplomatic relations, for China, there were two major issues that needed to be tackled before normalization of diplomatic relations. These "obstacles" were the Soviet military deployment in Mongolia and along the PRC borders, and Soviet aid in support of Vietnam's invasion and occupation of Cambodia. China refused to begin any discussion of diplomatic or party relations until these obstacles were removed. The Soviets responded by refusing to unilaterally agree to any of the demands, instead insisting on bilateral relations first. Since neither side would negotiate, the attempts to meet stalled.

The Soviet–Afghan War ended this brief warming of Sino-Soviet relations and led to increased military cooperation between China and the United States. The growing semi-official military alliance with the United States allowed the Chinese to strike back at the Soviets. The US and PRC established joint intelligence listening posts in Manchuria to monitor the Soviet Union, and these facilities remained staffed by Chinese intelligence. The Soviet invasion of Afghanistan raised tensions between the US and USSR, and provided another realm for Sino-US military cooperation. It also opened another military front on the Sino-Soviet border, and while this border was never the site of direct confrontations, the PRC was worried about the additional Soviet presence. In 1980, the US and PRC jointly opened two further listening stations in Xinjiang, specifically focused on tracking Soviet troops in Afghanistan. Furthermore, Xinjiang became the base of Chinese aid to the Mujahideen, with PLA soldiers training and providing weapons to the anti-Soviet guerillas. According to Yitzhak Shichor, "PLA personnel provided training, arms, organization, financial support, and military advisers to the Mujahideen resistance throughout nearly the entire Soviet military presence in Afghanistan, with the active assistance and cooperation of the CIA." These PLA and CIA joint training camps were located near Kashgar and Khotan, spending $200–400 million training and arming the rebels.

In the wake of the invasion, China solidified its terms for establishing bilateral relations, demanding the end of Soviet military deployment in Mongolia and along PRC borders, the cessation of Soviet aid in support of Vietnam's invasion and occupation of Cambodia, and total withdrawal from Afghanistan; making a total of "three major obstacles." There was more to the Afghanistan conflict than just another front for border confrontations. Historian Péter Vámos argues that "the Soviet invasion of Afghanistan, which had initially seemed so threatening to China’s security, led to a change in the balance of forces between the superpowers and made the prospects of war seem more distant, partly as a result of a tacit strategic partnership between China and the United States described euphemistically as the pursuit of parallel actions." The new listening posts and cooperation between the US and PRC counter-balanced Soviet threats in the West, while the increasing quagmire of the Soviet war appeared to weaken the Soviet Army.

Deng Xiaoping pursued a policy of balance between the US and USSR. Relations between China and the USSR improved in the early 1980s. In 1981–82, Chinese fears of Soviet encirclement and a coming war diminished; however, the desire to remove these threats remained the top priority for normalization of Sino-Soviet relations. In 1982, Leonid Brezhnev took a big step towards normalization with a speech in Tashkent, Uzbek SSR. In this speech, "the Soviet leader called China a socialist country, supported China’s position on Taiwan, expressed his willingness to improve relations with China, and proposed consultations between the two sides." Deng reacted immediately, and the Ministry of Foreign Affairs responded saying "We paid attention to the sections concerning Sino-Soviet relations in President Brezhnev’s speech in Tashkent on March 24. We categorically refute its attacks against China. In Sino-Soviet relations and in international affairs, we attach importance to the Soviet Union’s real actions." In response, Deng sent Yu Hongliang to give the following message to the Soviet government via the PRC embassy in Moscow.

"There has been an abnormal relationship between China and the Soviet Union for many years, and the two peoples do not want to see the continuation of such a situation. Now it is time to do something to improve Sino-Soviet relations. Of course, the problems cannot be solved in one day, but the Chinese side holds that the important thing is the existence of true willingness to improve relations. It is fully possible to find a fair and reasonable solution through negotiations. The Chinese side proposes that the Soviet Union should persuade Vietnam to withdraw its troops from Cambodia as a starting point, or it is also possible to start with other problems that influence the relationship between our two countries, such as the reduction of military force in the border region. At the same time, both sides should work on finding mutually acceptable measures in order to solve the problem of withdrawal of Soviet troops from Mongolia. The Chinese side also hopes that a fair solution can be found for the Afghan issue. To sum up, only if both sides think about the prospects for the development of the relationship are willing to resume good neighborly relations between our two great countries, starting with solving one or two of the important problems, will it then be possible to open up a new phase in bilateral relations. As to the form of exchanging views, it can be done by consultations between the two sides." - Yu Hongliang

The PRC remained focused on overcoming the "three major obstacles" for diplomatic relations, but this note added flexibility, recognizing that these issues could be solved over time. Vietnam and Cambodia remained the top priority. The Soviets responded positively, agreeing to work towards resolving these obstacles, beginning formal political level meetings at the vice-foreign minister level. Further warming occurred with the writing of the 1982 PRC Constitution, which removed references to "social imperialism" and "contemporary revisionism" which had been inserted during the height of the Sino-Soviet split. The first vice-foreign minister meeting was held in Beijing in October 1982, and eleven further semi-annual meetings were held up until 1988. The discussions which began with political lectures, warmed over the following years. The three major obstacles to normalized relations, however, remained. As evidence of the change in China's position since 1976, the PRC continued to lobby for the withdrawal of Soviet military forces and aid in Vietnam, insisting that peaceful coexistence between the PRC and USSR be the guideline for relations.

Several notable meetings occurred with the resumption of political negotiations: the two foreign ministers met at the UN in 1984, and First Deputy Prime Minister Ivan Arkhipov toured the PRC later that same year. Furthermore, the PRC announced to Eastern bloc diplomats that "China would be ready to re-establish inter-party relations with the Soviet Union and other socialist countries" as long as the Soviets ended military support to Vietnam. Despite progress in cultural and political ties from greater trade to ping-pong competitions, neither nation was willing to compromise on the balance of military power in Asia. China continued to see the USSR as a threat, and the USSR saw the presence of troops in the Far East, Mongolia and Afghanistan, as well as continued military aid to Vietnam, as crucial for its overall geopolitical goals. Despite stagnation in bilateral diplomatic relations, the diplomatic teams achieved numerous other goals in this period. State-to-state economic, scientific, and cultural exchanges were re-established, allowing further warming of state-level relations. Trade between the two nations increased dramatically through the 1980s growing from 223 million Soviet rubles in 1982 to 1.6 billion rubles in 1985.

In the winter of 1984–1985, the first vice-chairman of the USSR Council of Ministers, Ivan Arkhipov, traveled to Beijing and, at a state banquet, it was announced that China recognized the Soviet Union as a fellow socialist country. From this point forward, the Chinese propaganda ministry backed away from its attacks on the USSR, ending decades of ideological warfare. In March 1985, while in Moscow for Konstantin Chernenko's funeral, Li Peng met with the new Soviet General Secretary Mikhail Gorbachev, with both sides explicitly stating their desire to normalize all relations. While Gorbachev focused on consolidating his power in the following two years, the PRC and USSR reached towards each other, further establishing a new "network of diplomatic, scientific, cultural, sports, health, and other exchanges" between the two powers.

The gradual warming continued through 1985. At the 27th Congress of the CPSU, Mikhail Gorbachev announced the beginnings of perestroika in the USSR, radically reforming and restructuring the stagnant Soviet economy. In his speech, Gorbachev praised the earlier Chinese reforms, and simultaneously expressed an interest to further improve ties with the PRC. The new Soviet government recognized that economic stagnation had been greatly worsened by overextending its military might across the world, and Gorbachev sought to reduce the load on the Soviet Union by withdrawing troops and aid from several costly conflicts. The USSR simply could not afford its interventionist foreign policy, and overextending the military was at the heart of its financial woes. Gorbachev radically reduced military spending, leading to massive troop withdrawals in Afghanistan and reduced aid to many allied nations.

Furthermore, Gorbachev announced troop withdrawals from Mongolia, Afghanistan and the Russian Far East, announcing his intention to remove the "obstacles" to Sino-Soviet relations, while also recognizing the Chinese view of the northern border, accepting that the dividing line ran through the middle of the main channel of the Amur and Ussuri Rivers. Furthermore, the countries resumed diplomatic relations on the consular level; the PRC opened a consulate in Leningrad, and the USSR opened one in Shanghai.

Despite Gorbachev's concessions, both sides continued to make cautious careful moves towards full relations. Scientific and trade expositions resumed in 1986. Gorbachev's new political thinking of 1988 sped up the normalization process significantly. It recognized that disarmament was key to the economic survival of the USSR, including unilateral disarmament and equal participation in regional economic and diplomatic relations.

== Bilateral Foreign Relations 1989 - 1991 ==
With Gorbachev's concessions on troops, the Chinese also stepped back agreeing that the "three major obstacles" could be resolved simultaneously to negotiations for full diplomatic normalization of relations. For the first time, the Chinese foreign minister visited both nations in 1988, announcing that all diplomatic relations were to occur on equal footing. The two foreign ministers then set the formal summit meeting between all parties for May 15–18, 1989 in Beijing, where Gorbachev would finally meet Deng and diplomatic relations fully normalized.

In the midst of the Tiananmen Square protests of 1989, Deng and Gorbachev met with "only handshake but no embrace." The two nations established bilateral diplomatic declarations under the five principles of peaceful coexistence. Both sides agreed that there was no dogmatic model for socialism and that both nations were socialist societies, led by Communist parties. Furthermore, Gorbachev rejected the Brezhnev Doctrine on the USSR's right to intervene in socialist nations affairs, while also stating that the USSR did not strive to dominate the PRC politically, economically, nor ideologically. The groups agreed to move forward on settling the Cambodian situation with Vietnam. In economics, the USSR "proposed among others cooperation in metallurgy, the energy sector and transport, whereas the Chinese put forward the idea of a broader utilization of Chinese labor forces in Siberia." The term "only handshake but no embrace" refers to the formalizing of bilateral diplomatic relations without the close party-party alliance relations of the earlier Sino-Soviet Alliance; the two nation's mutual diplomatic recognition, and bilateral economic relations avoided the pitfalls that doomed the earlier Sino-Soviet relationship.

On May 16, 1991, the USSR and PRC signed Sino-Soviet Border Agreement in order to resolve most of the border disputes between the two states.

Normalized bilateral diplomatic relations would last until the dissolution of the Soviet Union on December 25, 1991.

== See also ==
- Sino-Soviet relations
- History of Sino-Russian relations
- Sino-Soviet split
- Sino-Soviet border conflict

== Bibliography ==
- Bernstein, Thomas, and Hua-Yu Li. China Learns from the Soviet Union, 1949-Present (Lanham: Lexington Books, 2010).
- Clarke, Michael. Xinjiang and China's Rise in Central Asia - A History. (New York: Routledge, 2011)
- Dillon, Michael. Xinjiang – China’s Muslim Far Northwest. (New York: Routledge, 2004).
- Friedman, Jeremy. Shadow Cold War: the Sino-Soviet split and the Third World (Chapel Hill: University of North Carolina Press, 2015).
- Jersild, Austin. The Sino-Soviet Alliance: An International History (Chapel Hill, NC: The University of North Carolina Press, 2014).
- Khoo, Nicolas. Collateral Damage: Sino-Soviet Rivalry and the Termination of the Sino-Vietnamese Alliance (New York: Columbia University Press, 2011).
- Millward, James. Eurasian Crossroads. (New York: Columbia University Press, 2009).
- Starr, S. Frederick ed., Xinjiang: China’s Muslim Borderland. (New York: Central Asia-Caucasus Institute, 2004).
- Li, Danhui, and Yafeng Xia. Mao and the Sino-Soviet Split, 1959-1973: A New History (Lanham: Lexington Books, 2018).
- Li, Danhui. “The Sino-Sovieet Dispute over Assistance for Vietnam’s Anti-American War, 1965-1972” in Behind the Bamboo Curtain edited by Priscilla Roberts (Stanford, CA: Woodrow Wilson Center, Stanford * * * University Press, 2006).
- Luthi, Lorenz. The Sino-Soviet Split: Cold War in the Communist World (Princeton: Princeton University Press, 2008).
- Shen, Zhihua, and Danhui Li. After Leaning to One Side: China and its allies in the Cold War. (Washington, D.C.: Woodrow Wilson Center Press, 2011).
- Shen, Zhihua and Xia Yafeng. Mao and the Sino-Soviet Partnership, 1945-1959: A New History (Lanham: Lexington Books, 2015).
- Westad, Odd Arne. The Global Cold War: Third World Interventions and the Making of Our Times. (New York: Cambridge University Press, 2007).
