= Su Wenmao =

Chinese xiangsheng comedian

- Born: February 24, 1929; Beijing, China
- Died: May 3, 2015 (aged 86); Tianjin, China

Su Wenmao (Chinese: 苏文茂; January 24, 1929 – May 3, 2015) was a Chinese xiangsheng comedian.

He was born on January 24, 1929, to a poor family. In his youth, he greatly enjoyed xiangsheng. In the 1940s, he worked as a teacher in Tianjin.
