= Deng Sanrui =

Chinese shipbuilding engineer (1929–2020)

- 邓三瑞

President of Harbin Shipbuilding Engineering Institute
- In office June 1983 – June 1987
- Preceded by: Feng Jie
- Succeeded by: Qian Qiushan

Personal details
- Born: October 19, 1929 Beijing, China
- Died: September 15, 2020 (aged 90) Harbin, Heilongjiang, China
- Party: Chinese Communist Party
- Education: National Chiao Tung University; Dalian Naval Academy

Chinese name
- Traditional Chinese: 鄧三瑞
- Simplified Chinese: 邓三瑞
Transcriptions
Standard Mandarin
- Hanyu Pinyin: Dèng Sānruì

Deng Sanrui (Chinese: 邓三瑞; October 19, 1929 - September 15, 2020) was a Chinese shipbuilding engineer. He was general designer of 7B8 ROUV. He had been hailed as "father of the submarine in China".

== Biography ==
Deng was born in Beijing on October 19, 1929, while his ancestral home was in Ningyuan County, Hunan. He attended the High School Affiliated to National Central University. In 1949, he was accepted to National Chiao Tung University, where he studied shipbuilding under Ye Zaifu and Guo Xifen (郭锡汾). After the outbreak of the Korean War, he was admitted by the Jiangnan Shipyard and Dalian Naval Academy. After graduating in 1953, he was dispatched to the People's Liberation Army Military Academy of Engineering as associate professor, and became full professor in 1970. In 1980, he was promoted to vice-president of Harbin Shipbuilding Engineering Institute. In 1983 he was promoted again to become president of Harbin Shipbuilding Engineering Institute. He retired in September 1998. He died on September 15, 2020, aged 90.

Educational offices
Preceded by Feng Jie	President of Harbin Shipbuilding Engineering Institute; 1983-1987	Succeeded by Qian Qiushan
