= Second Battle of Guilin =

Coordinates: 25°16′30″N 110°17′46″E

- Part of the Central Plains War
Date	July 17, 1930
Location	Guilin, Guangxi
Result	Hunan Army victory

Belligerents
Hunan Army; Supported by: Nationalist government	New Guangxi clique army

Commanders and leaders
	Li Zongren

The Second Battle of Guilin was fought between the invading Hunan Army, allied to the forces of Chiang Kai-shek, and the forces of the New Guangxi clique personally commanded by Li Zongren. Li was facing a second invasion by the forces of the Yunnan Army (also allied to Chiang Kai-shek) targeted at Nanning. Li was forced to withdraw his forces from Guilin.
