= 2nd Infantry Regiment (United States) =

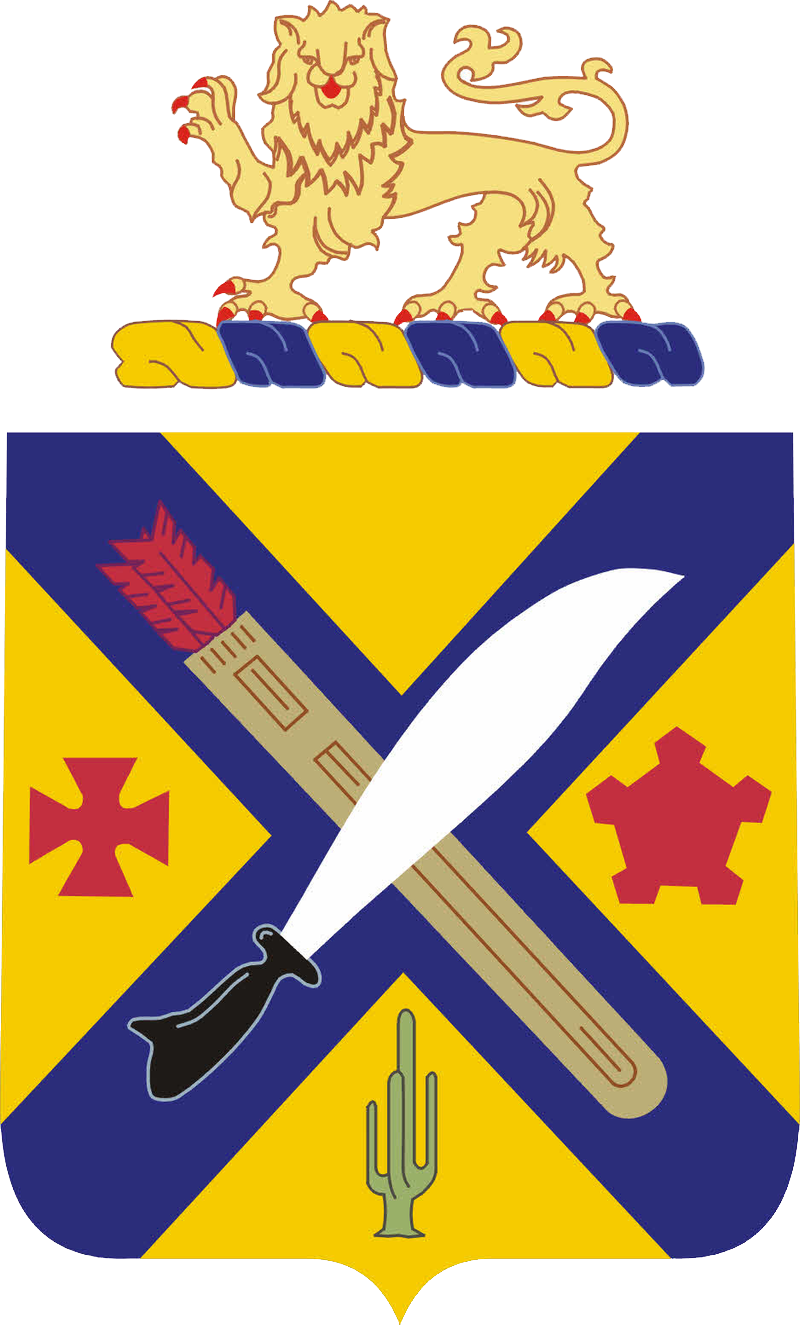
- 2nd Infantry Regiment coat of arms
- Active: 1808–present
- Country: United States
- Branch: United States Army
- Type: Infantry
- Role: 1st Battalion – Inactive; 2nd Battalion – Light Infantry
- Part of: 3rd BCT, 10th Mountain Division
- Garrison/HQ: 1st Battalion – Inactive; 2nd Battalion – Fort Polk, Louisiana
- Nicknames: 1st Battalion "Black Scarves"; 2nd Battalion "Ramrods"
- Mottos: "Noli Me Tangere" (Do Not Touch Me)
- Engagements: War of 1812; Indian Wars; Mexican–American War; American Civil War; Spanish–American War; Siege of Santiago; Philippine–American War; World War II; Vietnam War; Kosovo War; Global War on Terrorism; Iraq War
- Decorations: Presidential Unit Citation; Valorous Unit Award (3); Army Superior Unit Award

Commanders
- Notable commanders: Hugh Brady; Bennett C. Riley; James A. Irons; Frank C. Bolles; Frederick B. Shaw; Perry L. Miles

Insignia
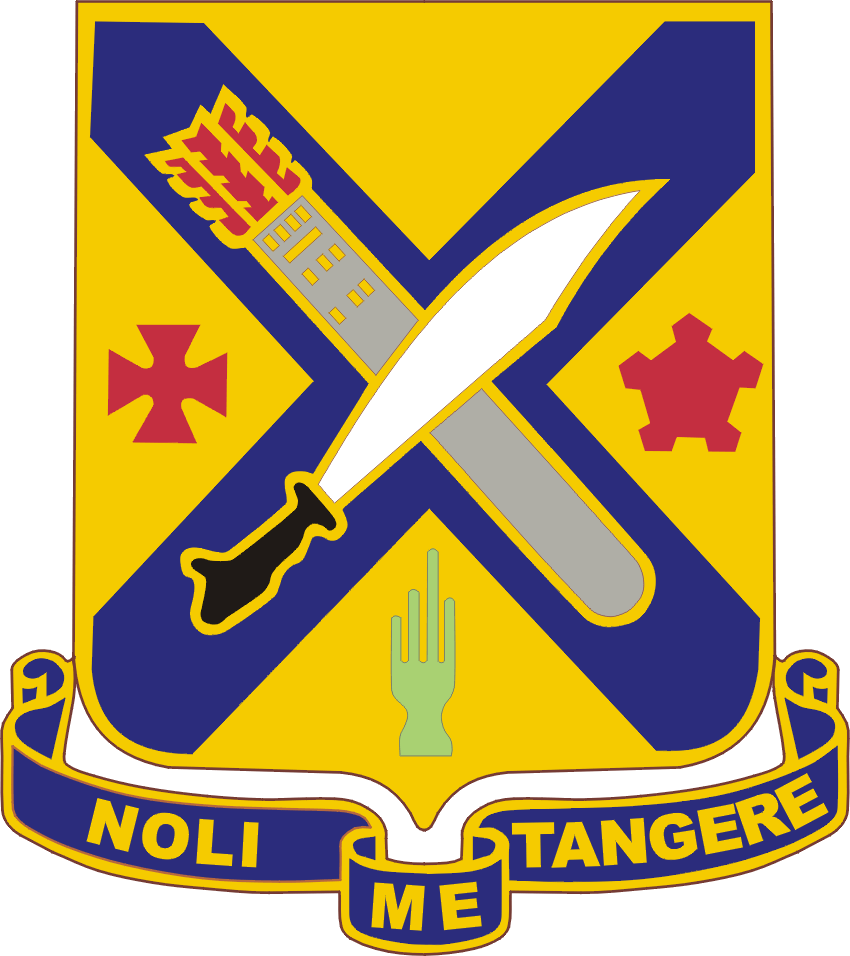
- Distinctive Unit Insignia

The 2nd Infantry Regiment is an infantry regiment in the United States Army that has served for more than two hundred years. It was constituted on 12 April 1808 as the 6th Infantry and consolidated with 4 other regiments in 1815 to form the present unit.

== Origin ==
The first unit designated the 2nd Infantry Regiment was constituted in March 1791 and fought in the Northwest Indian War and the War of 1812 at Fort Bowyer, Alabama. Its history and lineage are not a part of the present regiment, and it became part of the 1st Infantry through the consolidations of 1815. For the history of the original 2nd Infantry Regiment, please refer to the page for the 1st Infantry Regiment

At the end of the War of 1812, an act of Congress dated 3 March 1815 reduced the size of the Regular Army to a maximum of 10,000 men. Eight infantry regiments, one rifle regiment and an artillery regiment was formed from the elements of the 46 existing regiments, while the cavalry was eliminated. This was done with no regard for the traditions of the existing regiments. The old regiments which happened to be closest together were pooled to form new regiments and the numbers assigned the regiments were based on the seniority of the colonels commanding them.

In accordance with the act, on 17 May 1815 a new 2nd US Infantry was created by the consolidation of the 6th, 16th, 22nd, 23rd, and 32nd Regiments of Infantry, all then located in upper New York and Vermont. The date of organization of the present 2nd Infantry is that of the original 6th Infantry, 12 April 1808. The regiment's headquarters was in the cantonment at Sackett's Harbor. Colonel Hugh Brady became the regiment's commanding officer with Henry Leavenworth as major and Ninian Pinkney as lieutenant-colonel. The regimental number was "2" because Brady was the second most senior regimental commander in the United States Army. Colonel Brady was in command of the 22nd Infantry at the time of the consolidation and, though he served in several other commands and reached the rank of major general, he remained colonel commandant of the 2nd Infantry Regiment from his residence in Detroit until his death on 15 April 1851.

The War Department ruled that the present 2nd Infantry bear upon its colors the campaign honors of the regiments consolidated into its organization. Thus, the colors bear the campaign streamers for Canada, Chippawa and Lundy's Lane, even though it did not participate in any of the battles in Canada during the War of 1812. The present 2nd Infantry also bears the two battle honors earned by the original/old 2nd Infantry for the Miami Campaign (1790–1795) and Alabama 1814.

== Military service ==
=== First Indian War period ===
In the ensuing years the regiment was primarily concerned with manning and constructing forts around the Great Lakes. When the Black Hawk War of 1832 erupted the 2nd Infantry was sent to Illinois but did not participate in any fighting. The regiment returned to its posts on the Great Lakes. During the Second Seminole War, from 1838 to 1842, the regiment was in Florida, where it was on the move daily, fighting and building roads and installations. In April 1840 with Colonel Brady attending to other duty assignments Lieutenant Colonel Bennett C. Riley assumed command of the regiment. Lieutenant Colonel Riley remained in command of the regiment until January 1850. In 1843 the regiment returned to its posts on Lakes Ontario and Champlain in upstate New York.

=== War with Mexico ===
When war broke out with Mexico in 1846, the 2nd Infantry Regiment was sent to Camargo, Mexico and joined General David E. Twiggs' Brigade. From September 1846 to December 1847 the regiment campaigned from the Rio Grande to Mexico City, fighting in battles at Veracruz, Cerro Gordo, Contreras, Churubusco, Moline del Rey and Chapultepec.

=== Second Indian War period ===
In September 1848 because of conflicts with the Indians in Oregon and California the regiment was sent west. The regiment sailed via Rio de Janeiro, Cape Horn and Santiago, Chile, to California. Between 1849 and 1853 the regiment was in California occupying stations from Goose Lake on the north to Fort Yuma on the south and the Pacific Ocean on the west and the Sierra Nevada Mountains on the east, scouting, providing protection for the '49ers and fighting throughout the entire area. The regiment returned to New York in 1853 only to be sent to the Western Plains where it constructed or reconstructed forts, built roads and scouted the hills and plains along the Missouri River as far west as Fort Kearny, Nebraska and Fort Laramie, Wyoming.

=== American Civil War ===
During the Civil War the 2nd Infantry fought in the early Battle of Wilson's Creek in Missouri and the first Battle of Bull Run. The regiment was assigned to the Army of the Potomac and fought in engagements such as Manassas, Antietam, Fredericksburg, Chancellorsville, and Gettysburg. By June 1864 the commissioned and enlisted strength of the regiment had reached such a low figure, less than 100 men, that at the request of the regimental commander the remaining enlisted men were transferred to Company C, and that company was given a full complement of officers and non-commissioned officers. From then until December 1864 the entire regiment consisted of just Company C. On 18 April 1869 the 2nd Infantry was consolidated with the 16th Infantry and the consolidated unit was designated as the 2nd Infantry.

The 2nd Infantry bears nine battle honors from the Southern Campaign through its 1869 consolidation with the 16th Infantry. These honors were earned by the 16th Infantry: Atlanta, Chickamauga, Chattanooga, Georgia 1864, Kentucky 1862, Mississippi 1862, Murfreesboro, Shiloh, and Tennessee 1863.

=== Third Indian War period ===
From 1877 to 1886 the regiment was in Washington, Oregon and Idaho Territory campaigning against the Nez Perce, then the Bannocks and then a band of the Eastern Shoshones called the Sheepeaters. In 1886 it moved to Fort Omaha, Nebraska to help fight the Sioux. The 2nd Infantry was on the Pine Ridge Reservation on 29 December 1890 when the Wounded Knee Massacre occurred and, although the regiment was not involved, one officer from the regiment was wounded there. The regiment remained on the western plains until 1898.

=== Spanish–American War ===
In 1898 the regiment was deployed to Cuba at the start of the Spanish–American War, with Headquarters, Staff, Band, and Companies C and G sailing on the same ship with the Rough Riders. The regiment, under the command of LTC William Wherry, (regimental commander COL John C. Bates had been promoted to brigadier general of volunteers) fought in battles along the road to San Juan Heights and the battle of Santiago, where it fought on the extreme left of San Juan Heights. In August 1898, the regiment returned to the United States only to return to Cuba in January 1899. The regiment stayed in Cuba until September 1899 when it returned to the United States to prepare for deployment to the Philippines.

=== Philippine Insurrection ===
In August/September 1900 the 2nd Infantry was deployed to deal with the Philippine Insurrection during which it fought in over 25 engagements on several of the islands. In May 1903 the regiment returned to duty in the western United States, it was stationed at Fort Logan, Colorado and Fort D. A. Russell, Wyoming. In February 1906 the regiment was redeployed to the Philippines and remained there until returning to the United States in March 1908. The 3rd Battalion went to Fort Assinniboine, Montana and the balance of the regiment to Fort Thomas, Kentucky for training and garrison duties until deploying to Hawaii in 1911.

=== World War I ===
When war broke out, the 2nd Infantry Regiment was on security duty in the Hawaiian Islands guarding interned German ships and sailors, as well as various U.S. installations. In July 1918, it returned to the United States and was assigned to the 19th Division at Camp Dodge, Iowa. The war ended just as the regiment was about to deploy to France.

=== Post-World War I ===
In February 1919, the regiment was relieved from the 19th Division when it was demobilized, and resumed its status as a separate regiment. The 2nd Infantry was stationed at Camp Dodge, Iowa, as of June 1919. The 1st and 2nd Battalions were transferred in September 1919 to Camp Sherman, Ohio, while the regimental headquarters and 3rd Battalion followed in November. The 2nd Infantry was redesignated as a training center regiment on 27 July 1921 and assigned to the Sixth Corps Area Training Center, with the 2nd and 3rd Battalions being inactivated. The regiment was reorganized as a combat regiment on 17 August 1922 upon the inactivation of the Sixth Corps Area Training Center, and the 2nd and 3rd Battalions were reconstituted with personnel from the 54th Infantry. The regimental headquarters was transferred in August 1922 to Fort Sheridan, Illinois. Concurrently, the 1st Battalion was transferred to Fort Sheridan, the 2nd Battalion to Fort Wayne, Michigan; and the 3rd Battalion to Fort Brady, Michigan. The regiment was assigned to the 6th Division on 24 March 1923. The regimental headquarters was transferred in 1929 to Fort Wayne. In April 1933, the regiment assumed command and control of the 1st Forest District, Civilian Conservation Corps (later redesignated as the Fort Brady CCC District). Colonel Frederick B. Shaw, who wrote a history of the regiment, commanded from 1928 to 1930. Assigned Reserve officers, less those in the 2nd and 3rd Battalions, conducted summer training with the regiment at Fort Sheridan; those assigned to the 2nd Battalion trained at Camp Custer, Michigan, and those assigned to the 3rd Battalion trained at Fort Brady. Reserve officers also conducted the infantry Citizens Military Training Camp held at Camp Custer in 1939.

=== World War II ===
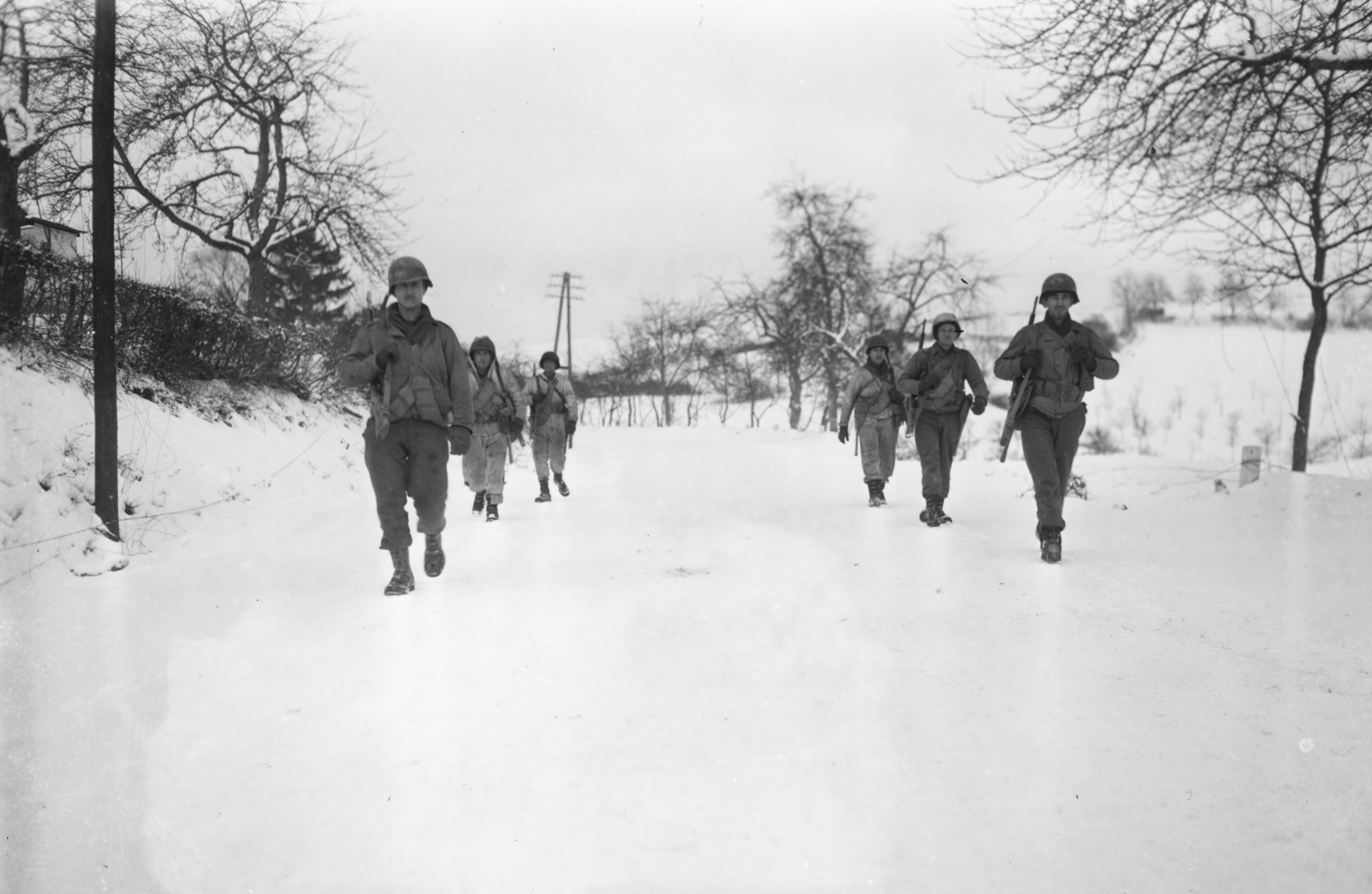
Men of the 2nd Infantry Regiment near Diekirch, Luxembourg, 21 January 1945

On 16 October 1939, the regiment was relieved from the 6th Division and assigned to the 5th Division. It was transferred on 3 November 1939 to Fort McClellan, Alabama, on 1 June 1940 to Fort Wayne, and on 25 September 1940 to Fort Custer. In February 1942 the regiment was sent to Iceland to relieve United States Marines who were providing security for U.S. bases located there, and to load and unload supply ships. It was then sent to England and then Ireland for training. In July 1944 the 2nd Infantry Regiment landed in Normandy, France. It became part of General George Patton's Third United States Army, leading the way in the breakout from the beaches of Normandy in Operation Cobra, capturing Rheims and then seized Metz after a major battle at Fort Driant.

When the Battle of the Bulge began the 2nd Infantry Regiment moved to the battle zone in the area of Nideranven, Luxembourg. In January 1945 the 2nd Infantry Regiment forced a crossing of the Sauer River and attacked into the Siegfried Line. The regiment then crossed the Rhine River near Oppenheim and secured the crossing for other Third Army units. The unit then spearheaded the attack into Czechoslovakia and was located near the town of Volary when the word came to cease all forward movement at 08:31 on 7 May 1945.

=== Post-World War II ===
Following World War II the 2nd Infantry Regiment returned to the United States and was inactivated and activated several times and returned to Germany for a period. During the Korean War the regiment was stationed at Indiantown Gap Military Reservation, Pennsylvania with the 5th Infantry Division training recruits for deployment to Korea. In June 1957, at the time of the Pentomic reorganization, the 2nd Infantry Regiment was stationed at Fort Ord, California with the 5th Infantry Division, serving as a training regiment. The 2nd Battalion was reorganized and redesignated as Headquarters and Headquarters Company, 2nd Battle Group, 2nd Infantry and released from assignment with 5th Infantry Division and assigned to the 1st Infantry Division. At this time both the 1st and 3rd Battalions were inactivated.

In January 1959 the 2nd Battle Group was reassigned to the 24th Infantry Division in Germany. In February 1962 the 1st Battalion was activated and assigned to the 2nd Brigade, 5th Infantry Division. The 2d Battle Group, 2nd Infantry was reorganized and redesignated and concurrently relieved from assignment to the 24th Infantry Division and also assigned to the 2nd Brigade, 5th Infantry Division. Both battalions were stationed at Fort Devens, Massachusetts.

=== Vietnam War ===
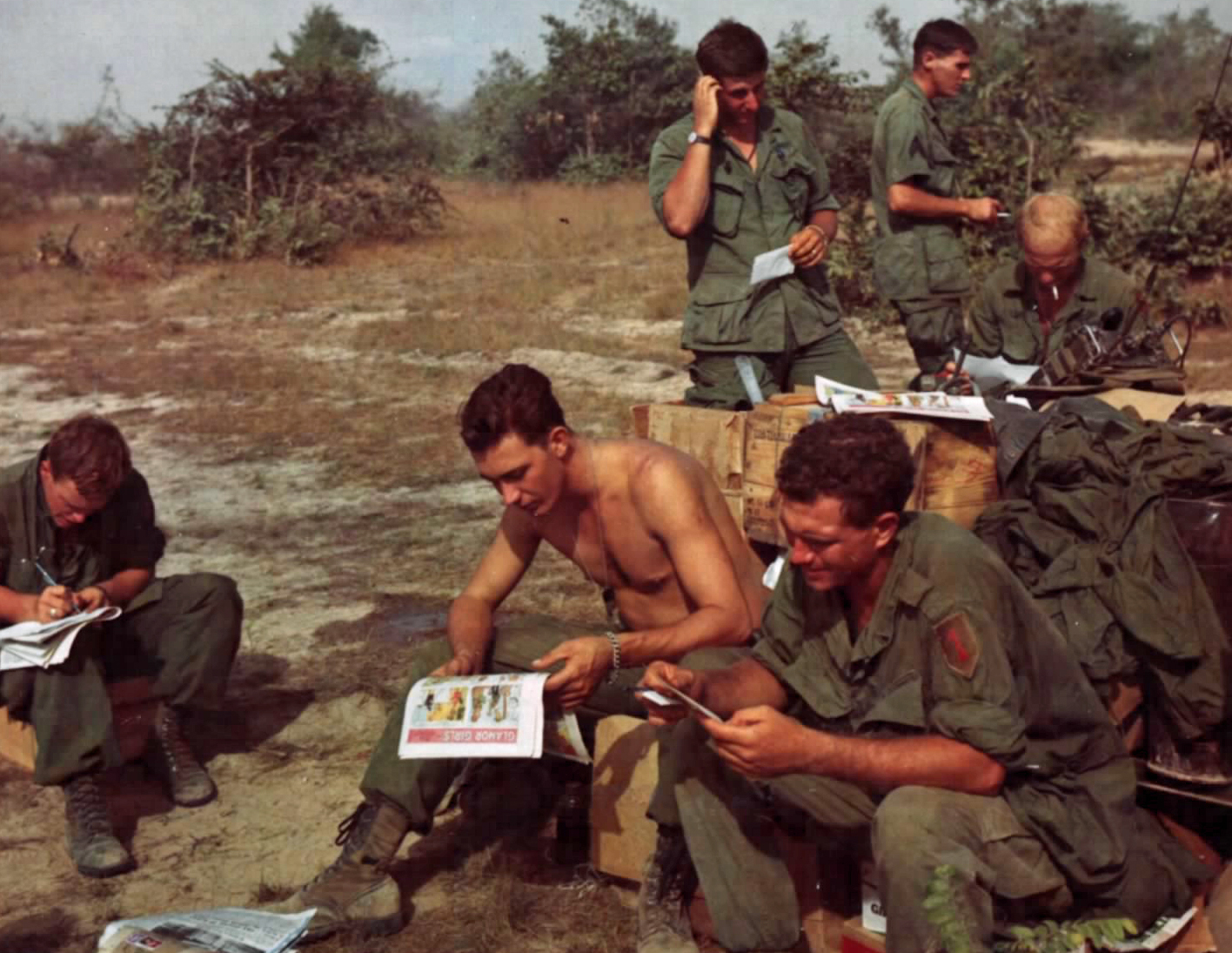
Members of 2nd Platoon, Company B, 2nd Battalion (Mech), 2nd Infantry Regiment, read their mail and newspapers south of Lai Khe. 8 January 1968

When the fighting in Vietnam escalated the 1st Infantry Division was restructured and Battle groups were redesignated as infantry battalions. On 12 July 1965 the 1st and 2nd Battalions, 2nd Infantry were relieved from assignment to the 5th Infantry Division and assigned to the 1st Infantry Division with no change of station and in September 1965 the two battalions deployed to Vietnam, landing on the beach at Vũng Tàu in October 1965. From there they proceeded to their assigned areas, Phước Vĩnh for the 1st Battalion and Lai Khe for the 2nd Battalion. The battalions initially fought as light infantry in the areas north and west of Saigon. On 2 January 1967 the 2nd Battalion officially became a mechanized infantry battalion.

The 1st Battalion sustained its first major casualties of the war on 21 December 1965 when the enemy ambushed the command group of Company B as the company was moving out of Bien Hoa on routine patrol. On 25 August 1966 during Operation Amarillo a patrol from Company C, 1st Battalion was ambushed after stumbling into a Viet Cong base camp, losing 6 men killed of the 15-man patrol, total US losses in the operation were 41 killed, 45 Viet Cong bodies were found, while later intelligence indicated that Viet Cong losses were 171 men killed. The 2nd Battalion fought its first major battles at Ap Bau Bang on 12 November 1965 and Ap Nha Mat on 5 December 1965. Heavy losses were suffered at Ap Nha Mat and three soldiers are still listed as missing.

During four and a half years the battalions were involved in major operations such as: Junction City, the largest operation conducted up to that time, Lam Son II, Paul Bunyan, Bù Đốp (aka Battle of Hill 172), An Lộc, and An Lộc II and numerous other operations and small unit actions. Contact with the enemy was almost daily. When the 1st Infantry Division stood down in March and April 1970 the 1st and 2nd Battalion's colors were cased and the soldiers were either reassigned to other units in Vietnam or returned to the United States to be discharged.

=== Post-Vietnam War ===
In early April 1970 an honor guard returned Fort Riley, Kansas with the 1st Division and its assigned unit's colors. At that time the 1st Battalion became a mechanized infantry battalion and remained active with the 1st Infantry Division until it was inactivated on 1 October 1983. On 15 April 1970 the 2nd Battalion was inactivated.

On 21 March 1973 the 2nd Battalion was relieved from assignment to the 1st Infantry Division and reassigned to the 9th Infantry Division. It was activated at Fort Lewis, Washington with the reflagging of the 1st Battalion, 60th Infantry. In May 1991 the 2nd Battalion was inactivated and relieved from assignment to the 9th Infantry Division.

On 16 February 1996 the 2nd Battalion was reassigned to the 1st Infantry Division and on 27 March was activated at Rose Barracks, Vilseck, Germany as Task Force 2/2 Infantry with the reflagging of the 1st Battalion, 6th Infantry. The 2nd Battalion deployed to Bosnia in support of Operation Joint Guard in 1996. In 1997 the battalion, as part of Task Force Eagle Stabilization Force (SFOR), was awarded the Army Superior Unit Award for actions such as Brčko riots and Hill 562. The 2nd Battalion redeployed to Vilseck in October 1997. On 24 November 1999, the battalion deployed to Camp Monteith, Kosovo. The battalion was redeployed to Vilseck in June 2000. The unit was again deployed to Camp Monteith, Kosovo in November 2002 until July 2003 as the last regular Army unit conducting operations. The national guard took formal command of operations from the 2nd Battalion.

=== Global war on terrorism ===
==== 1st Battalion ====
On 17 March 2008, for the first time in over 24 years, the 1st Battalion was activated in Schweinfurt, Germany with the reflagging of the 1st Battalion, 18th Infantry. 1-18 was a part of 2nd "Dagger" Brigade, 1st Infantry Division which was also reflagged as the 172nd Infantry Brigade (Separate). The 1st Battalion was assigned to 172nd Infantry Brigade and was a mechanized infantry battalion. The battalion had adopted the motto "Back in Black" and wore black scarves in recognition of the battalion's service in Vietnam.

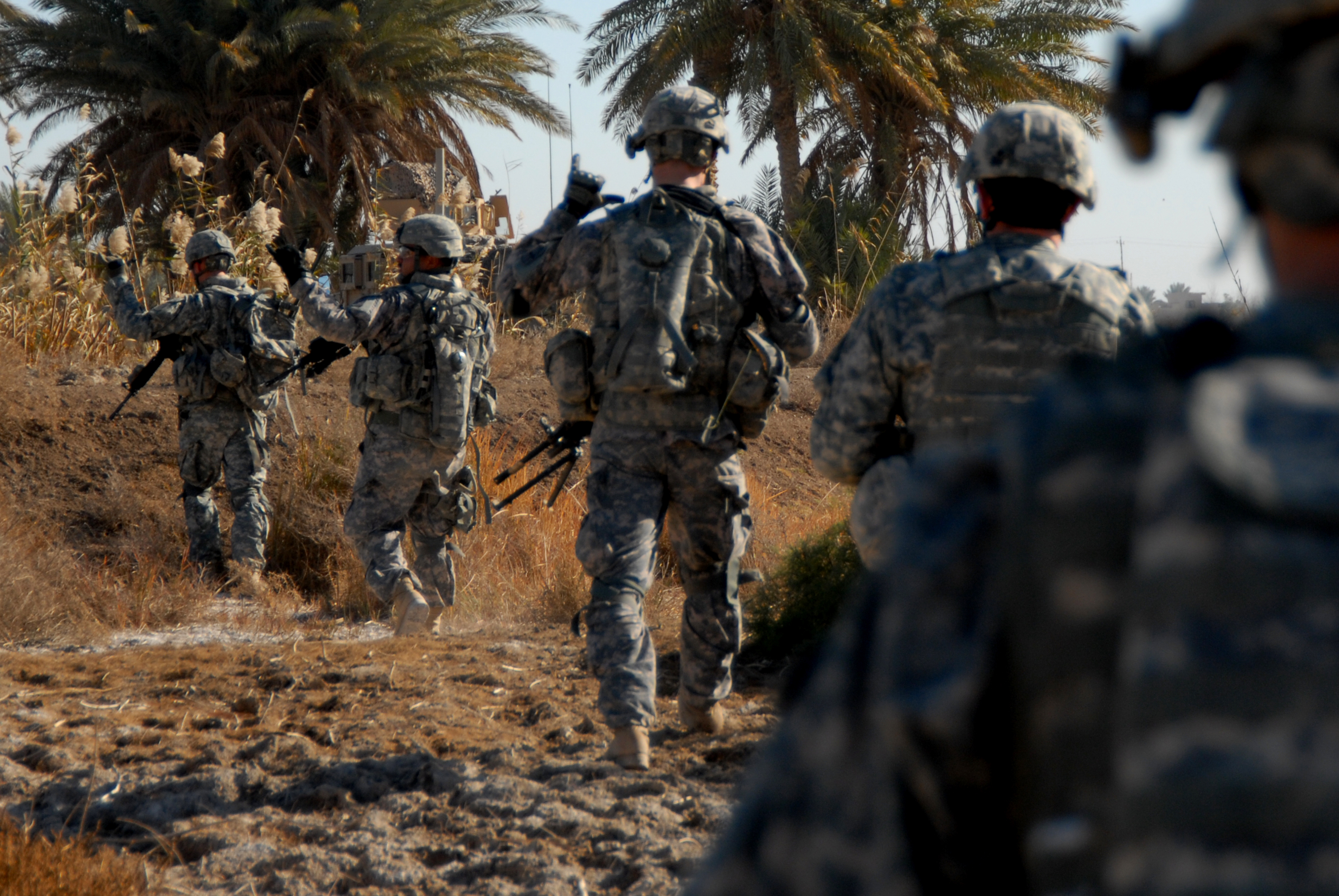
Soldiers from 1st Battalion, 2nd Infantry Regiment, 172nd Infantry Brigade signal each other during roadside clearance near FOB Kalsu, Iraq on Dec. 29, 2008

In December 2008 the 1st Battalion (TF 1-2) deployed to Iraq and suffered its first casualty in April 2009 when a soldier was killed by an IED. In late October 2009 the first elements of the 1st Battalion, 2nd Infantry and the 172nd Infantry Brigade began returning to Germany from Iraq. By mid November the entire battalion was back in Germany. TF 1-2 suffered four killed and three wounded during its deployment. The 1st Battalion had a change of command on 19 May 2010 and along with the entire 172d Infantry Brigade moved to Grafenwoehr, Germany.

In late July 2011 the 1st Battalion, 2nd Infantry (TF 1-2) along with the entire 172nd Infantry Brigade deployed to Afghanistan. The transfer of authority from 1st Battalion, 61st Cavalry (101st Airborne Division) to Task Force 1-2 Infantry (TF 1-2) occurred on 13 August 2011 at 10:00. TF 1-2 was detached from the 172nd and worked for 3rd Brigade, 25th Infantry Division and was in control of Western Nangarhar.

On 14 August 2011 the 1st Battalion sustained its first casualties when two soldiers from Company A were killed by an IED while recovering a damaged vehicle. Company A, 1st Battalion, 2nd Infantry had been attached to TF 3-66 Armor since 2008. Alpha Company, 3rd Battalion, 66th Armor (attached) worked in the Zio Haq area and Company B, 1st Battalion, 2nd Infantry fought at FOB Altimur.

On 24 November 2011, the Black Scarves were ordered to move from Nangarhar to FOB Andar in Ghazni Province, Afghanistan to conduct a relief in place with the 2nd Battalion. On 3 January 2012 at 10:30, the transfer of authority between the two units occurred. Following the ceremony the 2nd Battalion began departing Afghanistan.

In early June 2012 the 1st Battalion began departing Afghanistan and returned to their base in Grafenwoehr, Germany with the last troops arriving back in Germany on 19 June. Task Force 1-2 suffered over 15 wounded during their latest deployment and A Company, 1st Battalion suffered 2 killed in action and 3 wounded while attached to Task Force 3-66 Armor. After returning to Germany the battalion trained and conducted Expert Infantryman Badge testing.

The 1st Battalion, 2nd Infantry along with the entire 172nd Infantry Brigade was inactivated in a Casing of the Colors ceremony held on 31 May 2013. The effective date of the battalion's inactivation was 15 June 2013.

==== 2nd Battalion ====
In April 2003 with Operation Iraqi Freedom underway, Company B, 2nd Battalion, 2nd Infantry deployed to Bashur Airfield in Northern Iraq as part of the 173rd Airborne Brigade's Task Force 1-63 Armor, to aid in opening a northern front in Iraq. This was called Operation Airborne Dragon, Northern Iraq with the entire task force being air lifted from Germany. Company B and the entire task force returned to Germany in February 2004.

In the spring of 2004 the 2nd Battalion, less Company B, deployed to Iraq with the 1st Infantry Division. On 20 July 2004 SSG Raymond Bittinger, 3rd Platoon, Company C, 2nd Battalion, 2nd Infantry was awarded a Silver Star for leadership and heroism under fire on 9 April 2004 in Baqubah, Iraq. SSG Bittinger was the first soldier of the 1st Infantry Division to receive a Silver Star during Operation Iraqi Freedom. During its year deployment to Iraq Task Force 2-2 Infantry also fought at Al Muqdadiyah, An Najaf, Al Fallujah, Mosul, and Baqubah.

In November 2004 Task Force 2-2, which comprised HHC; Company A; scouts of the 2/2; Company A, 2d Battalion, 63d Armor; 2d Platoon, Company B, 1st Engineer Battalion; 2d Platoon, Company A, 82d Engineer Battalion; Troop F, 4th Cavalry; and 1st Platoon, Battery A, 1/6 Field Artillery, fought alongside U.S. Marines in the Battle of Fallujah. SSG David Bellavia was awarded a Medal of Honor for his actions during the Battle of Fallujah and Task Force 2-2 Infantry received a Presidential Unit Citation for their actions in the Battle of Fallujah.

The 2nd Battalion returned to Germany in February 2005. In May 2006 the battalion was disbanded and its colors were cased. On 19 April 2007 the 2nd Battalion, 2nd Infantry was activated as a light infantry battalion with the 1st Infantry Division, 3rd Infantry Brigade Combat Team at Fort Hood, Texas.

In June 2008 the 2nd Battalion, along with the 3rd Infantry Brigade Combat Team, deployed to Afghanistan. The battalion conducted operations in the Maywand District of Kandahar Province. On 4 September 2008 Company C, 2nd Battalion suffered its first casualties when a Humvee was hit by an IED and a follow on enemy attack. On 6 May 2009 at FOB Ramrod, Defense Secretary Robert M. Gates presented awards to six members of Company C, 2nd Battalion, 2nd Infantry Regiment, for their actions on 4 September. Bronze Star awards with "V" device went to SSG Anthony Roszko, SPC Kevin Tibbett, and CPL Justin Skotnicki. Army Commendation Medals with "V" device went to PFC Michael Kehrer, PVT Alexander Hayes and SGT Justin Chaney. On 28 May 2009 PFC Robert Debolt, a rifleman with Company C, 2nd Battalion, was awarded a Silver Star for gallantry. SGT Ramin Berntsson was also awarded a Bronze Star with "V" device for his actions that day, upon redeployment to Fort Hood, Texas. The 2nd Battalion returned to Fort Hood in June 2009. On 10 September 2009 the 2nd Battalion had a change of command and on 16 October 2009 moved to Fort Knox, Kentucky.

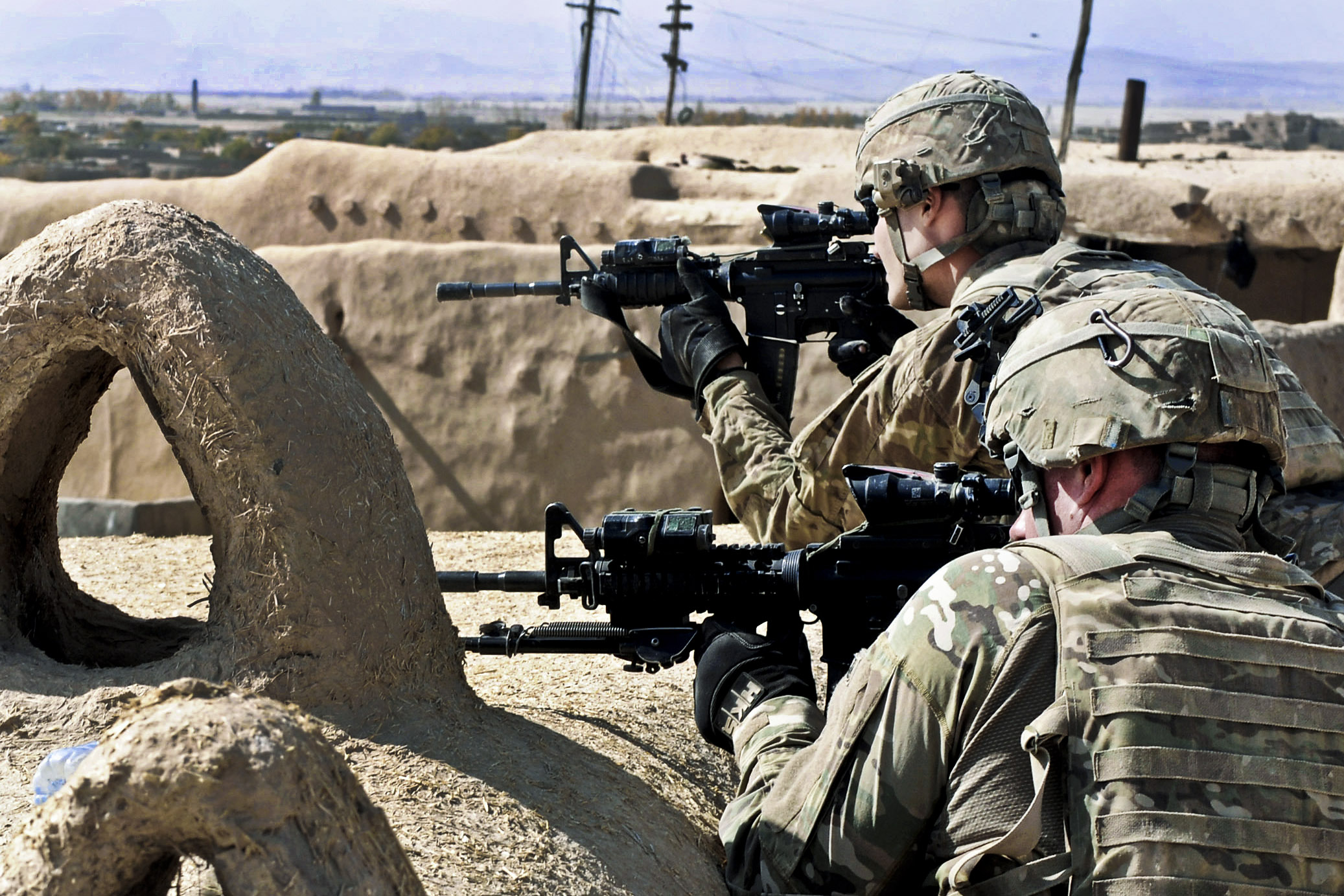
Soldiers from 2nd Battalion, 2nd Infantry Regiment, 3rd Brigade Combat Team, 1st Infantry Division scan their sectors from a rooftop vantage point in Arezo village, Afghanistan. 31 October 2011

In January 2011 the 2nd Battalion, along with the 3rd Brigade Combat Team once again deployed to Afghanistan. The battalion conducted operations in Ghazni Province. On 27 February 2011 the battalion sustained its first casualties when one soldier was killed and four wounded by an IED. In its one-year deployment 2nd Battalion suffered 3 killed and 49 wounded while conducting over 1,900 combat patrols and 22 air assaults as they and their Afghan partners captured 111 caches and killed 250 insurgents. On 3 January 2012, following a change of authority ceremony with 1st Battalion, 2nd Infantry, the 2nd Battalion began departing Afghanistan. Since returning to Fort Knox the 2nd Battalion had a change of command and in training for its next deployment to Afghanistan.

In June 2013 the 2nd Battalion, along with the 3rd Brigade, 1st Infantry Division, again deployed to Afghanistan. The unit took responsibility for the security forces assistance team mission in Zabul Province at a TOA ceremony when it relieved the 5th Troop, 7th Cavalry.

In late February 2014, following a transfer of authority with the 2nd Battalion, 12th Infantry at FOB Apache, the 2nd Battalion left Afghanistan and returned to Fort Knox.

The 2nd Battalion was inactivated as part of 3rd Brigade, 1st Infantry Division's inactivation on 21 May 2014.

On 13 January 2015 Company D 2d Battalion was activated as part of the 4th BSTB, 4th Brigade Combat Team, 10th Mountain Division in a ceremony on Fort Polk's Mountain Field. Company D was being activated as a "provisional" company, attached to the 4th Brigade Special Troops Battalion, in support of a security support tasking for SOUTHCOM. The mission will consist of CPT Andrews as the D Co Commander, SFC Ramos as the 1SG/NCOIC, and about 50 Soldiers selected from 2-4 IN, 2-30 IN & 3-89 CAV, all units from within 4-10 MTN. They performed security duties in support of humanitarian operations, within the SOUTHCOM AOR. Their mission is from FEB-AUG 2015, and when they return to Fort Polk, they will "officially" become part of 2d Battalion 2d Infantry. In February Company D, 2d Battalion deployed with the USNS Comfort on a seven-month humanitarian mission to the Caribbean. The official uncasing of the colors and Assumption of Command ceremony for the 2d Battalion was held on 3 September 2015 at Fort Polk, LA. Company D returned from their 7-month deployment on the USNS Comfort on 30 September 2015.

On 21 March 2016 the Department of the Army announced that the 3rd Brigade Combat Team, 10th Mountain Division, stationed in Fort Polk, Louisiana, will be associated with the Texas Army National Guard's 36th Infantry Division. For the first time ever an active duty unit would wear a National Guard patch. This historic event was part of the U.S. Army's Associated Units Pilot Program. At a ceremony held on 16 September 2016 the 3rd Brigade, 10th Mountain "Patriots" removed their 10th Mountain Division patch and place on the highly regarded T Patch of the 36th Infantry Division.For the first time ever an active duty unit will wear a National Guard patch. This historic event is part of the U.S. Army's Associated Units Pilot Program. Since that time the brigade and battalion has reverted to the 10th Mountain Division and wear that division's patch.

On 19 April 2017 LTC John Newman assumed command of the 2d Battalion from LTC Aaron Coombs. Beginning in mid-September 2017 the 2d Battalion, 2d Infantry along with other elements of the 3d Brigade Combat Team of the 10th Mountain Division began deploying to Iraq for a 9-month tour. They will be replacing the 2d Brigade Combat Team of the 82d Airborne Division. The 2d Battalion began returned to Fort Polk beginning in June 2018.

On 22 March 2019 LTC Andrew Sinden assumed command of the 2d Battalion from LTC John Newman at a change of command ceremony held at Fort Polk, LA. On 10 January 2020 at a ceremony held at Fort Polk, La. CSM Mason L. Joiner assumed responsibility of the 2nd Battalion, 2nd Infantry Regiment, 3rd Brigade Combat Team, 10th Mountain from CSM Derek G. Wise.

On 10 June 2022 CSM Robert J. Absher assumed responsibility of the 2d Battalion from CSM Mason Joiner at a change of responsibility ceremony held at Fort Polk, LA. On 26 August 2022 at a ceremony held at Fort Polk, La. LTC William R. Sitze assumed command of the 2nd Battalion, 2nd Infantry Regiment, 3rd Brigade Combat Team, 10th Mountain from LTC Sean M. Ontiveros.

=== Medal of Honor recipients ===
Four soldiers have earned the Medal of Honor while serving with the 2nd Infantry:

- First Sergeant Daniel W. Burke, Company B, for his actions at Shepherdstown Ford, Virginia, on 20 September 1862. When his unit retreated across the Potomac River he learned that a piece of artillery had been left unspiked leaving it usable by the enemy. He volunteered to go back and disable the gun, and returned to spike the gun in the face of the enemy. Coming under heavy rebel fire he was unable to complete the task, he retreated back across the river under constant fire. He was commissioned a second lieutenant in the 2nd Infantry on 18 July 1862 and promoted to first lieutenant on 2 July 1863. He remained in the Army and retired as a brigadier general on 21 October 1899. He is buried at Arlington National Cemetery.
- Staff Sergeant James Leroy Bondsteel, Company A, 2nd Battalion, 2d Infantry for his actions in An Lộc Province, Vietnam on 24 May 1969 when he was painfully wounded but continued to fight and rally his troops. He remained in the Army until retiring in 1985 as a master sergeant. Bondsteel was living and working in Alaska when he was involved in an accident with a logging truck and was killed. He is buried in the Fort Richardson National Cemetery located in Alaska. The major U.S. Army base in Kosovo, Camp Bondsteel, was named in his honor.
- Sergeant Candelario Garcia Jr. was posthumously awarded the Medal of Honor on 18 March 2014 for actions while serving as an acting Team Leader for Company B, 1st Battalion, 2d Infantry, 1st Brigade, 1st Infantry Division during combat operations in Lai Khe, Republic of Vietnam on 8 December 1968. Sergeant Garcia was originally awarded a Distinguished Service Cross for his actions.
- Staff Sergeant David Bellavia was awarded the Medal of Honor on 25 June 2019 for his actions in support of Operation Phantom Fury on 10 November 2004 while serving as a squad leader with Company A, 2d Battalion, 2d Infantry, 3rd Brigade, 1st Infantry Division. He is the first living service member from the war in Iraq to receive the nation's highest honor. He was originally awarded a Silver Star Medal for his actions.

=== Casualties ===
Casualty lists for all the conflicts that the 2nd Infantry has been in can be found under OUR HISTORY at http://www.secinfreg.org

== Heraldry ==
=== Distinctive unit insignia ===
- Description

A Gold color metal and enamel device 1 1/8 in. (2.86 cm) in height consisting of a shield blazoned: Or, on a saltire inches Azure between in fess a cross pattée and a five-bastioned fort Gules and in base a giant cactus Vert, two arrows in a quiver Proper crossed with a bolo Argent hilted Sable. Attached below the shield is a Blue scroll inscribed "NOLI ME TANGERE" in Gold letters.

- Symbolism

Service in the Civil War is shown by the blue cross from the Confederate flag and the red cross pattée, the badge of the 2nd division, V Corps, in which the regiment served during the greater part of that war. Service in the Mexican War is shown by the cactus; in the War with Spain by the five-bastioned fort, the badge of the V Corps in Cuba. The Indian campaigns of the regiment are shown by the arrows and quiver, and the bolo is for service in the Philippine Insurrection.

- Background

The first design for the distinctive unit insignia of the 2d Infantry Regiment was approved on 20 February 1920. That design was canceled and the present design authorized for the regiment on 19 June 1936.

=== Coat of arms ===
- Blazon
  - Shield: Or on a saltire Azure between in fess a cross pattée and a five-bastioned fort Gules and in base a giant cactus Vert, two arrows in a quiver Proper crossed with a bolo Argent hilted Sable.
  - Crest: On a wreath of the colors a lion passant guardant Or.
  - Motto: NOLI ME TANGERE (Do Not Touch Me)
- Symbolism
  - Shield: Service in the Civil War is shown by the blue cross from the Confederate flag and the red cross pattée, the badge of the 18th Division, V Corps, in which the regiment served during the greater part of that war. Service in the Mexican War is shown by the cactus; in the War with Spain by the five-bastioned fort, the badge of the V Corps in Cuba. The Indian campaigns of the regiment are shown by the arrows and quiver, and the bolo is for service in the Philippine Insurrection.
  - Crest: The lion represents the Canadian campaigns of the War of 1812.
- Background: The coat of arms was approved on 6 June 1921.

== Lineage ==
=== Regiment ===
- Constituted 12 April 1808 in the Regular Army as the 6th Infantry
- Organized May–July 1808 in Pennsylvania, New York, and New Jersey
- Consolidated May–October 1815 with the 16th Infantry (constituted 11 January 1812), the 22d and 23d Infantry (both constituted 26 June 1812), and the 32d Infantry (constituted 29 January 1813) to form the 2d Infantry
- Consolidated 18 April 1869 with the 16th Infantry (see ANNEX) and consolidated unit designated as the 2d Infantry
- Assigned 27 July 1918 to the 19th Division
- Relieved 14 February 1919 from assignment to the 19th Division
- Assigned 24 March 1923 to the 6th Division
- Relieved 16 October 1939 from assignment to the 6th Division and assigned to the 5th Division (later redesignated as the 5th Infantry Division)
- Inactivated 20 September 1946 at Camp Campbell, Kentucky
- Activated 15 July 1947 at Fort Jackson, South Carolina
- Inactivated 30 April 1950 at Fort Jackson, South Carolina
- Activated 1 March 1951 at Indiantown Gap Military Reservation, Pennsylvania
- Inactivated 1 September 1953 at Indiantown Gap Military Reservation, Pennsylvania
- Activated 25 May 1954 in Germany
- Relieved 1 June 1957 from assignment to the 5th Infantry Division and reorganized as a parent regiment under the Combat Arms Regimental System
- Withdrawn 16 June 1986 from the Combat Arms Regimental System and reorganized under the United States Army Regimental System
- Redesignated 1 October 2005 as the 2d Infantry Regiment

ANNEX

- Constituted 3 May 1861 in the Regular Army as the 1st Battalion, 16th Infantry
- Organized 21 August 1861 at Camp Slemmer (Chicago), Illinois
- Reorganized and redesignated 21 September 1866 as the 16th Infantry

=== 1st Battalion ===
- Constituted 12 April 1808 in the Regular Army as a company of the 6th Infantry
- Organized between May and July 1808 in Pennsylvania, New York, or New Jersey
- Consolidated May–October 1815 with a company of the 16th Infantry (constituted 11 January 1812), a company each of the 22d and 23d Infantry (both constituted 26 June 1812), and a company of the 32d Infantry (constituted 29 January 1813) to form a company of the 2d Infantry
- Designated 22 May 1816 as Company A, 2d Infantry
- Consolidated 18 April 1869 with Company A, 16th Infantry (see ANNEX) and consolidated unit designated as Company A, 2d Infantry

(2d Infantry assigned 27 July 1918 to the 19th Division; relieved 14 February 1919 from assignment to the 19th Division; assigned 24 March 1923 to the 6th Division; relieved 16 October 1939 from assignment to the 6th Division and assigned to the 5th Division (later redesignated as the 5th Infantry Division))

- Inactivated 20 September 1946 at Camp Campbell, Kentucky
- Activated 15 July 1947 at Fort Jackson, South Carolina
- Inactivated 30 April 1950 at Fort Jackson, South Carolina
- Activated 1 March 1951 at Indiantown Gap Military Reservation, Pennsylvania
- Inactivated 1 September 1953 at Indiantown Gap Military Reservation, Pennsylvania
- Activated 25 May 1954 in Germany
- Inactivated 1 June 1957 at Fort Ord, California, and relieved from assignment to the 5th Infantry Division; concurrently, redesignated as Headquarters and Headquarters Company, 1st Battle Group, 2d Infantry
- Redesignated 19 February 1962 as Headquarters and Headquarters Company, 1st Battalion, 2d Infantry, assigned to the 5th Infantry Division, and activated at Fort Devens, Massachusetts (organic elements concurrently constituted and activated)
- Redesignated 19 February 1962 as Headquarters and Headquarters Company, 1st Battalion, 2d Infantry, assigned to the 5th Infantry Division, and activated at Fort Devens, Massachusetts (organic elements concurrently constituted and activated)
- Relieved 12 July 1965 from assignment to the 5th Infantry Division and assigned to the 1st Infantry Division
- Inactivated 1 October 1983 at Fort Riley, Kansas, and relieved from assignment to the 1st Infantry Division
- Redesignated 1 October 2005 as the 1st Battalion, 2d Infantry Regiment
- Assigned 16 March 2008 to the 172d Infantry Brigade and activated in Germany
- Inactivated 15 June 2013 at Grafenwoehr, Germany

ANNEX

- Constituted 3 May 1861 in the Regular Army as Company A, 1st Battalion, 16th Infantry
- Organized 21 August 1861 at Camp Slemmer (Chicago), Illinois
- Reorganized and redesignated 21 September 1866 as Company A, 16th Infantry
- Consolidated 18 April 1869 with Company A, 2d Infantry, and consolidated unit designated as Company A, 2d Infantry

=== 2nd Battalion ===
- Constituted 12 April 1808 in the Regular Army as a company of the 6th Infantry
- Organized between May and July 1808 in Pennsylvania, New York, or New Jersey
- Consolidated May–October 1815 with a company of the 16th Infantry (constituted 11 January 1812), a company each of the 22d and 23d Infantry (both constituted 26 June 1812), and a company of the 32d Infantry (constituted 29 January 1813) to form a company of the 2d Infantry
- Designated 22 May 1816 as Company B, 2d Infantry
- Consolidated 18 April 1869 with Company B, 16th Infantry (see ANNEX), and consolidated unit designated as Company B, 2d Infantry
- (2d Infantry assigned 27 July 1918 to the 19th Division; relieved 14 February 1919 from assignment to the 19th Division; assigned 24 March 1923 to the 6th Division; relieved 16 October 1939 from assignment to the 6th Division and assigned to the 5th Division [later redesignated as the 5th Infantry Division])
- Inactivated 20 September 1946 at Camp Campbell, Kentucky
- Activated 15 July 1947 at Fort Jackson, South Carolina
- Inactivated 30 April 1950 at Fort Jackson, South Carolina
- Activated 1 March 1951 at Indiantown Gap Military Reservation, Pennsylvania
- Inactivated 1 September 1953 at Indiantown Gap Military Reservation, Pennsylvania
- Activated 25 May 1954 in Germany
- Reorganized and redesignated 15 February 1957 as Headquarters and Headquarters Company, 2d Battle Group, 2d Infantry, relieved from assignment to the 5th Infantry Division, and assigned to the 1st Infantry Division (organic elements concurrently constituted and activated)
- Relieved 28 January 1959 from assignment to the 1st Infantry Division and assigned to the 24th Infantry Division
- Reorganized and redesignated 19 February 1962 as the 2d Battalion, 2d Infantry; concurrently relieved from assignment to the 24th Infantry Division and assigned to the 5th Infantry Division
- Relieved 12 July 1965 from assignment to the 5th Infantry Division and assigned to the 1st Infantry Division
- Inactivated 15 April 1970 at Fort Riley, Kansas
- Relieved 21 March 1973 from assignment to the 1st Infantry Division, assigned to the 9th Infantry Division, and activated at Fort Lewis, Washington
- Inactivated 15 May 1991 at Fort Lewis, Washington, and relieved from assignment to the 9th Infantry Division
- Assigned 16 February 1996 to the 1st Infantry Division and activated in Germany
- Redesignated 1 October 2005 as the 2d Battalion, 2d Infantry Regiment
- Relieved 16 April 2007 from assignment to the 1st Infantry Division and assigned to the 3d Brigade Combat Team, 1st Infantry Division
- Relieved 15 July 2014 from assignment to the 3d Brigade Combat Team, 1st Infantry Division
- Inactivated 16 September 2014 at Fort Knox, Kentucky
- Assigned 16 September 2015 to the 3d Brigade Combat Team, 10th Mountain Division, and activated at Fort Polk, Louisiana

ANNEX

- Constituted 3 May 1861 in the Regular Army as Company B, 1st Battalion, 16th Infantry
- Organized 21 August 1861 at Camp Slemmer, Illinois
- Reorganized and redesignated 21 September 1866 as Company B, 16th Infantry
- Consolidated 18 April 1869 with Company B, 2d Infantry, and consolidated unit designated as Company B, 2d Infantry

== Honors ==
=== Campaign participation ===
- War of 1812:
  - Canada
  - Battle of Chippawa
  - Battle of Lundy's Lane
  - Alabama 1814
- Mexican–American War:
  - Vera Cruz
  - Cerro Gordo
  - Contreras
  - Churubusco
  - Molino del Rey
  - Chapultepec
- Indian Wars:
  - Miami
  - Seminoles
  - Nez Perces
  - Bannocks
  - Pine Ridge
  - California 1850
  - California 1851
  - California 1852
- Civil War:
  - Bull Run
  - Peninsula
  - Shiloh
  - Manassas
  - Antietam
  - Fredericksburg
  - Murfreesboro
  - Chancellorsville
  - Gettysburg
  - Chickamauga
  - Chattanooga
  - Wilderness
  - Atlanta
  - Spotsylvania
  - Cold Harbor
  - Siege of Petersburg
  - Missouri 1861
  - Kentucky 1862
  - Mississippi 1862
  - Virginia 1862
  - Virginia 1863
  - Tennessee 1863
  - Georgia 1864
- War with Spain:
  - Santiago
- Philippine Insurrection:
  - Streamer W/O Inscription
- World War II:
  - Normandy
  - Northern France
  - Rhineland
  - Ardennes-Alsace
  - Central Europe
- Vietnam:
  - Defense
  - Counteroffensive
  - Counteroffensive, Phase II
  - Counteroffensive, Phase III
  - Tet Counteroffensive
  - Counteroffensive, Phase IV
  - Counteroffensive, Phase V
  - Counteroffensive, Phase VI
  - Tet 69/Counteroffensive
  - Summer–Fall 1969
  - Winter–Spring 1970
- Kosovo
- War on Terrorism:
- Iraq
  - Transition of Iraq
  - Iraqi Governance
- Afghanistan
  - Consolidation III

=== Decorations ===
- Presidential Unit Citation (Army) for FALLUJAH 2004
- Valorous Unit Award for AP BAU BANG 1965
- Valorous Unit Award for BINH DUONG PROVINCE 1965
- Valorous Unit Award for BINH LONG PROVINCE 1969
- Army Superior Unit Award for 1997

==== 1st Battalion ====
- Meritorious Unit Commendation (Army), Streamer embroidered IRAQ 2008–2009
- Republic of Vietnam Cross of Gallantry with Palm for VIETNAM 1965–1968
- Republic of Vietnam Cross of Gallantry with Palm for VIETNAM 1969
- Republic of Vietnam Civil Action Honor Medal, First Class for VIETNAM 1965–1970
- Company A entitled to: Valorous Unit Award for AN LOC 1970
- Company A entitled to: Meritorious Unit Commendation (Army), Streamer embroidered IRAQ OCT 2008-SEP 2009

==== 2nd Battalion ====
- Presidential Unit Citation for FALLUJAH 2004
- Valorous Unit Award for AP BAU BANG 1965
- Valorous Unit Award for BINH DUONG PROVINCE 1965
- Valorous Unit Award for BINH LONG PROVINCE 1969
- Company C: Valorous Unit Award for BINH LONG PROVINCE 1968
- Valorous Unit Award, Streamer embroidered AN NAJAF PROVINCE 10 APR 2004 – 22 Apr 2004
- Meritorious Unit Commendation (Army), Streamer embroidered AFGHANISTAN 2011–2012
- Meritorious Unit Commendation (Army), Streamer embroidered AFGHANISTAN 2013–2014
- Army Superior Unit Award, (Army), Streamer embroidered 1997
- Republic of Vietnam Cross of Gallantry with Palm, Streamer embroidered VIETNAM 1965–1968
- Republic of Vietnam Cross of Gallantry with Palm, Streamer embroidered VIETNAM 1969
- Republic of Vietnam Civil Action Honor Medal, First Class, Streamer embroidered VIETNAM 1965–1970
- Company C: Valorous Unit Award, Streamer embroidered BINH LONG PROVINCE 1968
- Companies A and C Valorous Unit Award for AN NAJAF PROVINCE 10 APR 2004 – 22 APR 2004
- Detachment Company B: Valorous Unit Award for AFGHANISTAN 17 June 2013 – 1 November 2013

The following awards were earned by companies of the 2nd Infantry Regiment in World War II.

- Company E: Distinguished Unit Citation embroidered SANRY SUR NIED. (WD GO 68, 1945)
- Company E: Fr CdeG with Palm embroidered SANRY SUR NIED. (DA GO 43, 1950)
- Company H 1st Section, 3rd Platoon: Distinguished Unit Citation embroidered SANRY SUR NIED. (nondisplayable) (WD GO 68, 1945)

== In popular culture ==
- The 2nd Infantry Regiment is depicted in the 2016 film, Billy Lynn's Long Halftime Walk, which dramatizes the unit's 2004 deployment with the 1st Infantry Division to Iraq.

== See also ==
- List of United States Regular Army Civil War units
