= James L. Stone =

United States Army Medal of Honor recipient (1922–2012)

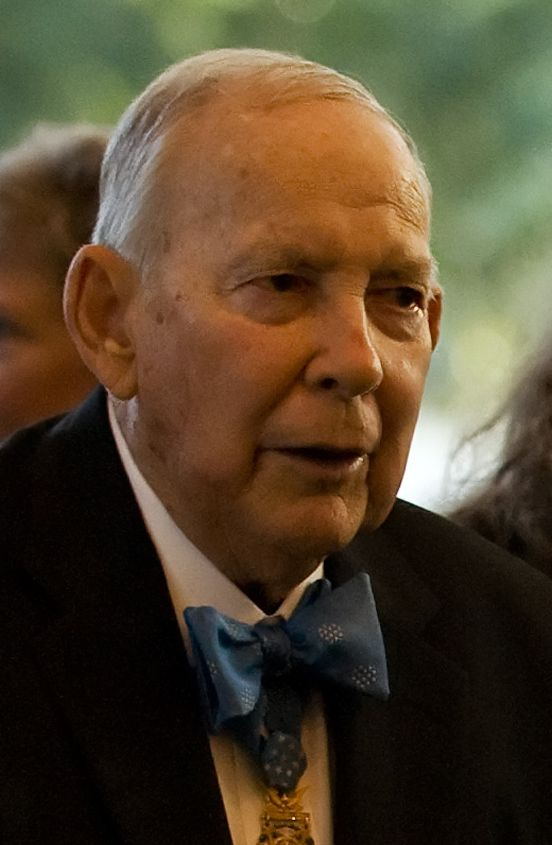
- Stone in 2010
- Born: December 27, 1922; Pine Bluff, Arkansas
- Died: November 9, 2012 (aged 89); Arlington, Texas
- Burial place: Dallas-Fort Worth National Cemetery
- Military career
- Allegiance: United States
- Branch: United States Army
- Service years: 1948–1976
- Rank: Colonel
- Units: 8th Cavalry Regiment, 1st Cavalry Division
- Conflicts: Korean War; Vietnam War
- Awards: Medal of Honor; Silver Star; Bronze Star Medal; Purple Heart

James Lamar Stone (December 27, 1922 – November 9, 2012) was a United States Army officer and a recipient of the United States' highest military decoration—the Medal of Honor—for his actions in the Korean War. He was awarded the medal for his conspicuous leadership during a fight against overwhelming odds, for continuing to lead after being wounded, and for choosing to stay behind after ordering others to retreat, a decision which led to his capture by Chinese forces.

== Military service ==
Stone attended the University of Arkansas and graduated with a bachelor's degree in 1947.

Stone joined the Army from Houston, Texas, in 1948, and by November 21, 1951 was serving as a first lieutenant in Company E of the 2nd Battalion, 8th Cavalry Regiment, 1st Cavalry Division. On that morning, Stone's platoon relieved another American unit that was manning a hilltop outpost above the Imjin River near Sokkogae, South Korea).

At about 9:00 pm, Chinese forces launched an artillery and mortar attack against the outpost, followed by a series of infantry assaults. Stone led his platoon's defense against the battalion-sized force. Just after midnight, a second battalion joined the Chinese assault, pitting Stone's 48-man platoon against roughly 800 enemy soldiers. Wounded three times during the battle, Stone continued to lead his men and fight, including in hand-to-hand combat. Realizing the defense was hopeless, Stone ordered those men who could still walk to leave and rejoin the rest of Company E, while he stayed behind with the badly wounded to cover their retreat. Stone eventually lost consciousness and, just before dawn on November 22, he and the six remaining men of his platoon were captured by Chinese forces.

After regaining consciousness, Stone was interrogated by the Chinese before being sent to a prison camp on the Yalu River. After 22 months of captivity, he was released in a prisoner exchange on September 3, 1953. Upon his liberation, Stone learned that he was to receive the Medal of Honor for his actions during the battle near Sokkogae.

Stone's Medal of Honor was officially approved on October 20, 1953 and presented to him a week later. At a ceremony in the White House on October 27, President Dwight Eisenhower presented Medals of Honor to Stone and six others.

Stone reached the rank of colonel and served in the Vietnam War before retiring from the Army in 1976.

== Medal of Honor citation ==
First Lieutenant Stone's official Medal of Honor citation reads:

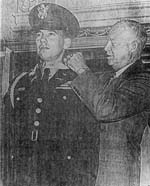
Stone receives the Medal of Honor from President Eisenhower

"1st Lt. Stone, distinguished himself by conspicuous gallantry and indomitable courage above and beyond the call of duty in action against the enemy. When his platoon, holding a vital outpost position, was attacked by overwhelming Chinese forces, 1st Lt. Stone stood erect and exposed to the terrific enemy fire calmly directed his men in the defense. A defensive flame-thrower failing to function, he personally moved to its location, further exposing himself, and personally repaired the weapon. Throughout a second attack, 1st Lt. Stone; though painfully wounded, personally carried the only remaining light machine gun from place to place in the position in order to bring fire upon the Chinese advancing from 2 directions. Throughout he continued to encourage and direct his depleted platoon in its hopeless defense. Although again wounded, he continued the fight with his carbine, still exposing himself as an example to his men. When this final overwhelming assault swept over the platoon's position his voice could still be heard faintly urging his men to carry on, until he lost consciousness. Only because of this officer's driving spirit and heroic action was the platoon emboldened to make its brave but hopeless last ditch stand."

=== Silver Star Citation ===
"The President of the United States of America, authorized by Act of Congress July 9, 1918, takes pleasure in presenting the Silver Star to First Lieutenant (Infantry) James Lamar Stone (ASN: 0-65096), United States Army, for gallantry in action against while serving with Company F, 2d Battalion, 8th Cavalry Regiment, 1st Cavalry Division, in action against the enemy on 9 October 1951 near Homang-ni, Korea. When Company F was assigned the mission of assaulting heavily fortified enemy positions manned by a numerically superior enemy force, the unit was pinned down by an overwhelming volume of small arms, automatic weapons, mortar and artillery fire. Lieutenant Stone, with complete disregard for his own safety, rushed to the head of his platoon, and, demonstrating a remarkable degree of intrepid leadership, led his men in a charge against the enemy positions which served to relieve pressure on the company and caused a large number of hostile casualties. Leaping on the wall of an enemy trench, waving and shouting to his men to follow him, Lieutenant Stone killed and wounded several of the enemy soldiers. As a result of his gallantry and selfless devotion to duty, the hostile forces suffered very heavy casualties, and the way was eased for the company to continue in the fight and eventually to successfully achieve its assigned mission. Lieutenant Stone’s gallantry and heroism reflect the highest credit on himself and the military service."

=== Legion of Merit Citation ===
"The President of the United States of America, authorized by Act of Congress, 20 July 1942, takes pleasure in presenting the Legion of Merit to Colonel (Infantry) James Lamar Stone (ASN: 0-65096), United States Army, for exceptionally meritorious conduct in the performance of outstanding services during the period September 1970 to August 1971, while serving as Senior Advisor to the National Noncommissioned Officer Academy, Training Center Division, Training Directorate, United States Military Assistance Command, Vietnam. Colonel Stone rendered exceptional organizational expertise and supervisory skill to the training advisory effort and greatly contributed to the mission accomplishment of the Noncommissioned Officer Academy. He effectively accomplished the planning and coordination of programs of instruction at the Noncommissioned Officer Academy to meet the varied training requirements throughout the Republic of Vietnam. His extensive staff and training experience enabled him to supervise and guide the detailed planning of training assistance provided to the Khmer Republic. By developing comprehensive plans and programs, he fostered a highly efficient and superbly motivated Student Brigade, well qualified to provide Noncommissioned Officers to the Army of the Republic of Vietnam. Colonel Stone’s professional competence and outstanding achievements were in keeping with the highest traditions of the military service and reflect great credit upon himself and the military service."

== Death ==
Stone died in November 2012 in Arlington, Texas, aged 89.

== See also ==
- List of Korean War Medal of Honor recipients
