= Operation Bushmaster II =

Part of the Vietnam War (1965)

- Part of the Vietnam War
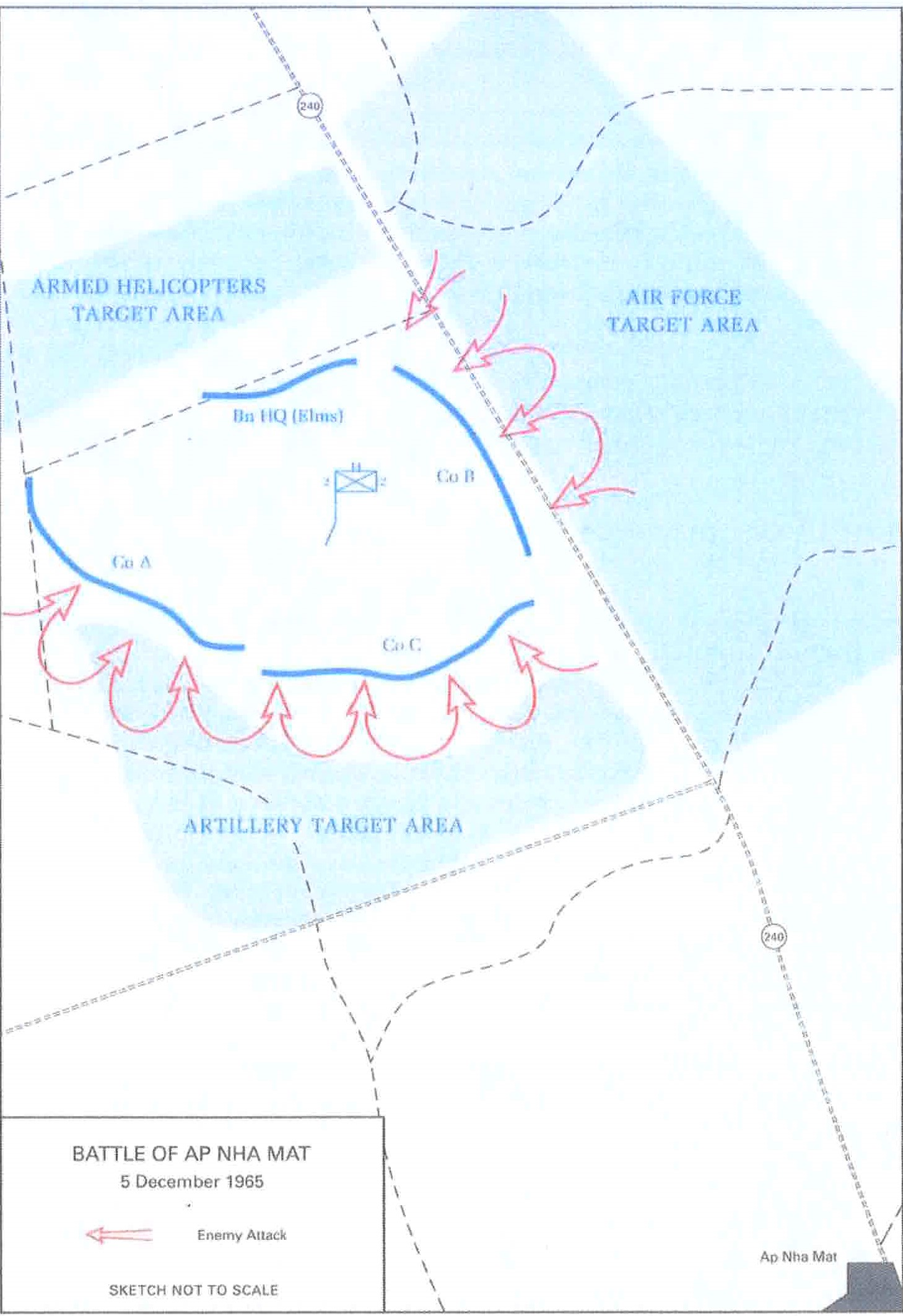
- Battle of Ap Nha Mat, 5 December 1965
Date	1–6 December 1965
Location	Michelin Rubber Plantation, South Vietnam 11.2631°N 106.334°E
Result	US declares operational success

Belligerents
United States	Viet Cong

Commanders and leaders
Col. William Brodbeck	unknown

Units involved
3rd Brigade, 1st Infantry Division	272nd Regiment

Strength
	US estimate: 2400

Casualties and losses
44 killed 3 missing	318 killed 27 captured 214 estimated killed and wounded 75 weapons recovered

Operation Bushmaster II (also known as the Battle of Ap Nha Mat) was a US Army operation that took place in the Michelin Rubber Plantation, lasting from 1 to 6 December 1965.

== Prelude ==
On the evening of 27 November 1965 the Army of the Republic of Vietnam (ARVN) 7th Regiment, 5th Division operating in the Michelin Rubber Plantation was overrun by the Viet Cong (VC) 271st and 273rd Regiments, killing most of the Regiment (possibly up to 500 soldiers) and its five US advisers. Major general Seaman ordered Colonel William Brodbeck's 3rd Brigade, 1st Infantry Division to rescue the shattered 7th Regiment. Several days later intelligence was received that the VC Phu Loi Battalion and the 272nd Regiment were operating in the area and the mission was changed to locating and engaging these units. The VC forces meanwhile prepared an ambush for the incoming assault planned by US forces.

== Operation ==
Operation Bloodhound, later renamed Operation Bushmaster II, commenced on 1 December when the 2nd Battalion, 2nd Infantry Regiment (2/2nd Infantry) was landed at Landing Zone Dallas (11.108°N 106.182°E) inside the Michelin Rubber Plantation. LZ Dallas was to serve as the command post for the two Battalions involved in the operation. From 2–5 December the US Battalions searched southeast of LZ Dallas in the VC base area known as the Long Nguyen Secret Zone.

At midday on 5 December, three companies from the 2/2nd Infantry assaulted a VC base complex and were met by heavy fire from the entrenched VC. An American attempt to outflank the VC position was repulsed and the VC force then attempted to outflank and press the Americans who retreated into a defensive perimeter. The 2/2nd Infantry commander LCol. Shuffer called for air and artillery support and the 8th Battalion, 6th Artillery Regiment and 2nd Battalion, 32nd Artillery Regiment provided fire support on the southwestern perimeter, while air strikes were conducted on the east and helicopter gunships strikes on the north. The VC attempted to escape this firepower by "hugging" the American positions, but were forced back by small arms fire. The barrage continued for over four hours allowing the 2/2 Infantry to secure their position and to allow Companies A and C to move south behind a creeping barrage to overrun the VC bunkers. Eighteen aerial sorties were conducted alongside the artillery barrage, which prompted the VC to withdraw. By 14:30 the VC begun withdrawing, leaving behind their dead and wounded. Shuffer decided not to pursue the retreating VC fearing a further ambush and withdrew into a night perimeter.

The 2/2nd Infantry spent the next few days policing the battlefield and destroying bunkers and Operation Bushmaster II ended on 6 December.

== Aftermath ==
Total US casualties were 44 killed and three missing, while the US claims VC losses were 318 killed and 27 captured and 75 individual weapons were recovered. The 272nd Regiment disappeared for the next four months presumably to recover its losses.
