= Bù Đốp Camp =

Bù Đốp Camp (Bù Đốp Airfield)
- Bù Đốp District, Bình Phước Province in Vietnam
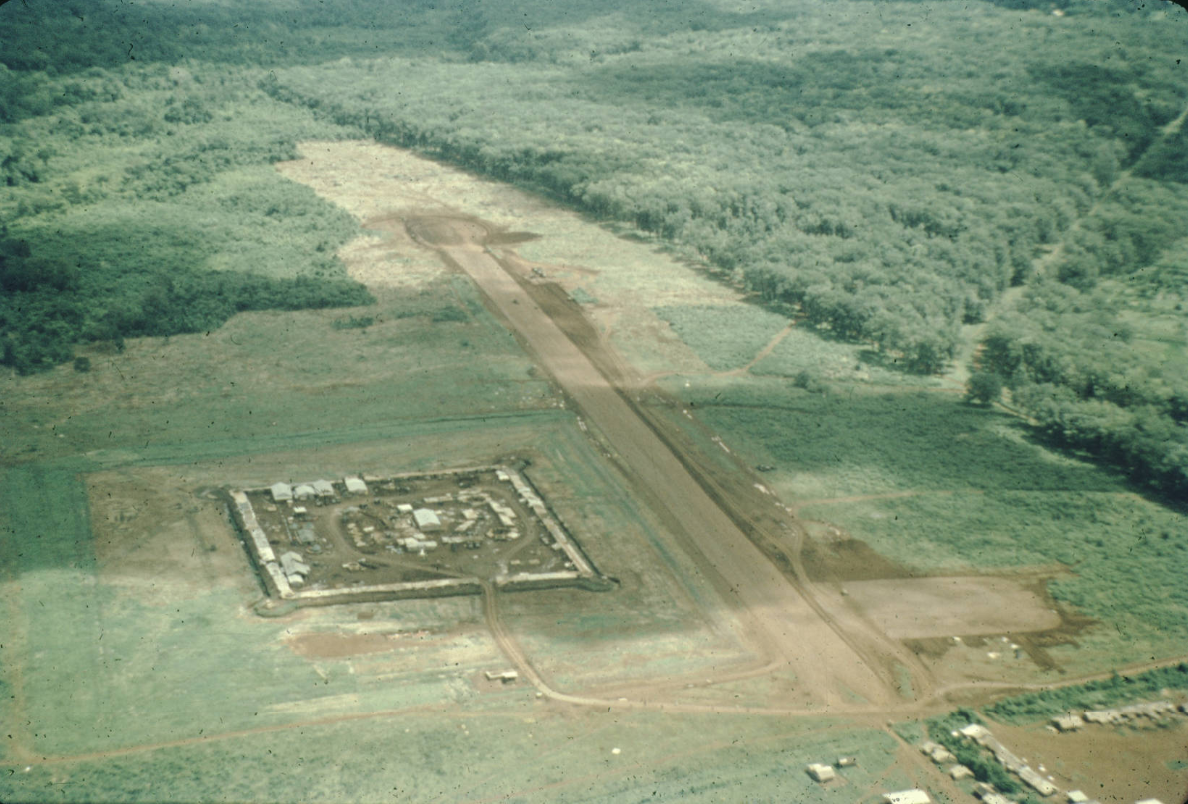
- Bù Đốp Camp, 23 September 1967

Site information
- Type: Army base
- Operator: Army of the Republic of Vietnam (ARVN); United States Army (U.S. Army)
- Condition: Abandoned

Location
- Shown within Vietnam
- Coordinates: 12°01′07″N 106°48′52″E

Site history
- Built: 1963
- In use: 1963-1974
- Battles/wars: Vietnam War

Garrison information
- Garrison: 5th Special Forces Group; 97th Border Ranger Battalion

Airfield information
- Elevation: 469 feet (143 m) AMSL
Runways
Direction	Length and surface
01/19	2,900 feet (884 m) Laterite

Bù Đốp Camp (also known as Bù Đốp Special Forces Camp) is a former U.S. Army and Army of the Republic of Vietnam (ARVN) base in Bù Đốp District, Bình Phước Province near the Vietnam-Cambodia border.

== History ==
The base was located approximately 33 km northeast of Lộc Ninh and 28 km northwest of Sông Bé Base Camp and approximately 5 km from the Cambodian border. The base camp was established by the 5th Special Forces Group Detachment A-341 in November 1963.

On the night of 20/1 July 1965 two Viet Cong battalions attacked the camp. At daybreak three CIDG companies arrived from Camp Bù Gia Mập securing the camp. VC losses were 161 killed.

From January through March 1967, repeated contact with the People's Army of Vietnam (PAVN) forces was made in the vicinity of the camp. On 14 January a CIDG company from the camp, accompanied by two U.S. Special Forces soldiers and two Army of the Republic of Vietnam (ARVN) Special Forces soldiers, departed the camp with the mission of conducting a search and destroy operation with reconnaissance in Bu Dop's tactical area of responsibility. The patrol left at 04:00. The terrain consisted of rubber trees, thick undergrowth, bamboo thickets, and savannah grass. The path of the patrol ran through an area where a reconnaissance patrol from Bù Đốp had encountered the enemy on 8 December 1966. As the patrol drew closer to that area, the men heard shots and the company immediately broke into three files and started to search the area. At 11:55, the point squad received fire and suffered one killed and one wounded. Firing broke out all around the company, and the advisers made radio contact with a Forward air controller who requested air strikes. The company was receiving heavy fire from the right flank, and seven more soldiers were wounded and two killed. The advisers recommended an assault from the right flank to prevent encirclement. The company was still in its initial assault and a momentary lull enabled the men to follow this lactic. The CIDG company attacked and overran the PAVN positions, and the disorganised PAVN withdrew in disarray. At 12:20 an air strike was made on the retreating PAVN. The troops continued the assault, finding the bodies of 25 PAVN soldiers in the positions. By this time, the company had suffered three killed and 11 wounded. Under cover of air strikes, the company withdrew to the west to locate a landing zone for medical evacuation. While waiting for the helicopters the men collected and assembled all equipment and documents captured. The company was still receiving small arms fire from the east and additional air strikes were made in that direction. The landing zone was secured and medical evacuation was completed by 15:00. At 17:30 an additional company landed and immediately started searching the area. The first company was extracted at 17:30 and returned to the camp. While searching the area, the new company found an additional 16 PAVN bodies. Twenty-five maps and schematic drawings that were also found indicated that plans were being made to attack the camp and the Bo Duc Subsector. At 19:15 the relief force withdrew to the camp, arriving there at 22:45. Within two hours after the first contact was made in this operation, the MIKE Force at Nha Trang had been airlifted to Bù Đốp to defend the camp.

At 07:15 on 17 February 1967, the 1st Company of the Third Nung Battalion (Airborne), III Corps' MIKE Force, arrived at Bù Đốp to reinforce the camp and conduct offensive operations to the east of camp. On 20 February, this company made contact with more than a battalion from the PAVN 12th Regiment, which was armed with 57 mm recoilless rifles, 82 mm mortars and the standard small arms. The PAVN directed an extremely heavy volume of fire into the advancing troops, but the Nungs outmaneuvered the PAVN and gained fire superiority. Fighting continued until tactical aircraft attacked. The PAVN broke off the fighting and headed for the Cambodian border. Withdrawing south to a landing zone where medical evacuation was accomplished and reinforcements were brought in, the company then moved west back into an area protected by Bù Đốp's artillery unit to rest for the night. The result of this action was 40 PAVN killed, one Special Forces soldier killed, one CIDG soldier killed and 7 CIDG soldiers wounded.

On 23 March 1967, two CIDG companies from the camp engaged a reinforced PAVN company approximately 10 km east of camp. Twenty PAVN were killed in this action along with another estimated 40 killed by air strikes. On 24 March, a CIDG company and a MIKE Force company conducted a heliborne assault on the same area and shortly thereafter became heavily engaged with two PAVN battalions, equipped with automatic weapons and recoilless rifles and supported by mortars. Casualties were three CIDG killed and 11 wounded and two Special Forces men and 11 MIKE Force soldiers missing. It was confirmed that 98 PAVN were killed, with a further 170 estimated killed by air strikes.

Shortly after midnight on 29 November 1967 the VC 2nd and 3rd Battalions, 272nd Regiment attacked the Bo Duc District headquarters, a fortified compound defended by a reconnaissance company from the ARVN 5th Division, a company of Regional Forces soldiers, and two Popular Forces platoons. VC mortar fire prevented the CIDG at Bù Đốp Camp from reinforcing the embattled district headquarters. On the afternoon of 29 November the 1st Battalion, 28th Infantry Regiment, as well as Battery A, 2nd Battalion, 33rd Artillery, equipped with 105 mm howitzers, flew in from Quản Lợi Base Camp to Bù Đốp and established a firebase at the northwestern end of the runway. Shortly after 22:00, a salvo of mortar rounds and 122 mm rockets plunged into the firebase. One rocket landed squarely on a bunker, killing all four of its occupants. When the bombardment ended, hundreds of VC soldiers from the 3rd Battalion, 271st Regiment, and elements of the 80A Replacement and Training Regiment emerged from rubber trees on the eastern side of the runway. As they crossed the open ground that separated the woods from the firebase, a distance of some 200 meters, the American artillery crews depressed their howitzer barrels and fired directly into the onrushing infantry. Small arms and machine gun fire from the 1/28th Infantry, brought down more VC troops, but they still pressed the assault. Minutes later a pair of helicopter gunships arrived overhead. A dozen or more VC antiaircraft machine guns greeted the aircraft, but their pilots evaded the fire and spotted a cluster of mortars firing from a soccer field in a nearby hamlet. Several strafing runs disabled the weapons and decimated their operators. A flight of F–100 fighter-bombers attacked the VC-held woods with bombs and cannon fire. The VC assault faltered and soon they were retreating back into the forest. By 00:30 almost all of the shooting had stopped. U.S. casualties were seven killed and 11 wounded, the VC left behind 31 bodies. VC prisoners later reported that the rest of the 271st and the entire 272nd Regiment had been lurking nearby during the engagement to exploit any breakthrough that occurred. During the next week, Allied patrols continued to clash with VC forces around Bo Duc, and each night mortar shells landed in the town. Believing that a second and larger attack against the district capital might still be in the offing, the 2/28th Infantry and a 4.2-inch mortar platoon were sent to fortify a second firebase at the Bù Đốp airstrip on 4 December. Two days later the 1st Battalion, 2nd Infantry Regiment and Battery B, 1st Battalion, 5th Artillery, to establish a firebase southeast of Bo Duc where VC activity had been spotted. At 01:00 on 8 December, the 3rd Battalion, 273rd Regiment, attacked the firebase of the 1/2nd Infantry, with the main assault party advancing behind a steady barrage of Rocket-propelled grenades. U.S. artillery, using the minimum amount of propellant possible because the engagement range was so short, tore through the VC ranks with high-explosive shells and prevented him from reaching the outer wire. After taking further losses from air strikes, helicopter gunships and 4.2-inch mortars, the VC withdrew around 03:00. The Americans counted 49 VC dead the next day against their own loss of four killed.

The base was later transferred to the ARVN 97th Border Ranger Battalion on 31 December 1970.

== Current use ==
The base has been turned over to farmland.
