= Operation Amarillo =

Part of the Vietnam War (1966)

- Part of the Vietnam War
Date	23–31 August 1966
Location	Bình Dương Province, South Vietnam 11.209°N 106.678°E
Result	Inconclusive

Belligerents
United States	Viet Cong

Commanders and leaders
BG William E. DePuy; Col. Sidney Berry	Unknown

Units involved
1st Brigade, 1st Infantry Division	Phu Loi Battalion; C62 Company

Casualties and losses
41 killed	99 killed

Operation Amarillo was an operation conducted by 1st Brigade, 1st Infantry Division in Bình Dương Province, lasting from 23–31 August 1966.

== Prelude ==
The operation commenced on 23 August as a road security operation by the 1st Brigade on Highways 1 and 16 between Dĩ An Base Camp and Phước Vĩnh Base Camp. the 1st Brigade established two artillery bases to support the operation, the 1st Battalion, 2nd Infantry Regiment (1/2nd Infantry) was at Firebase 1 at the hamlet of Bo La (11.206°N 106.695°E) 30 kilometres north of Dĩ An and the 1st Battalion, 26th Infantry Regiment (1/26th Infantry) was at Firebase 2 2 kilometres to the south.

== Operation ==
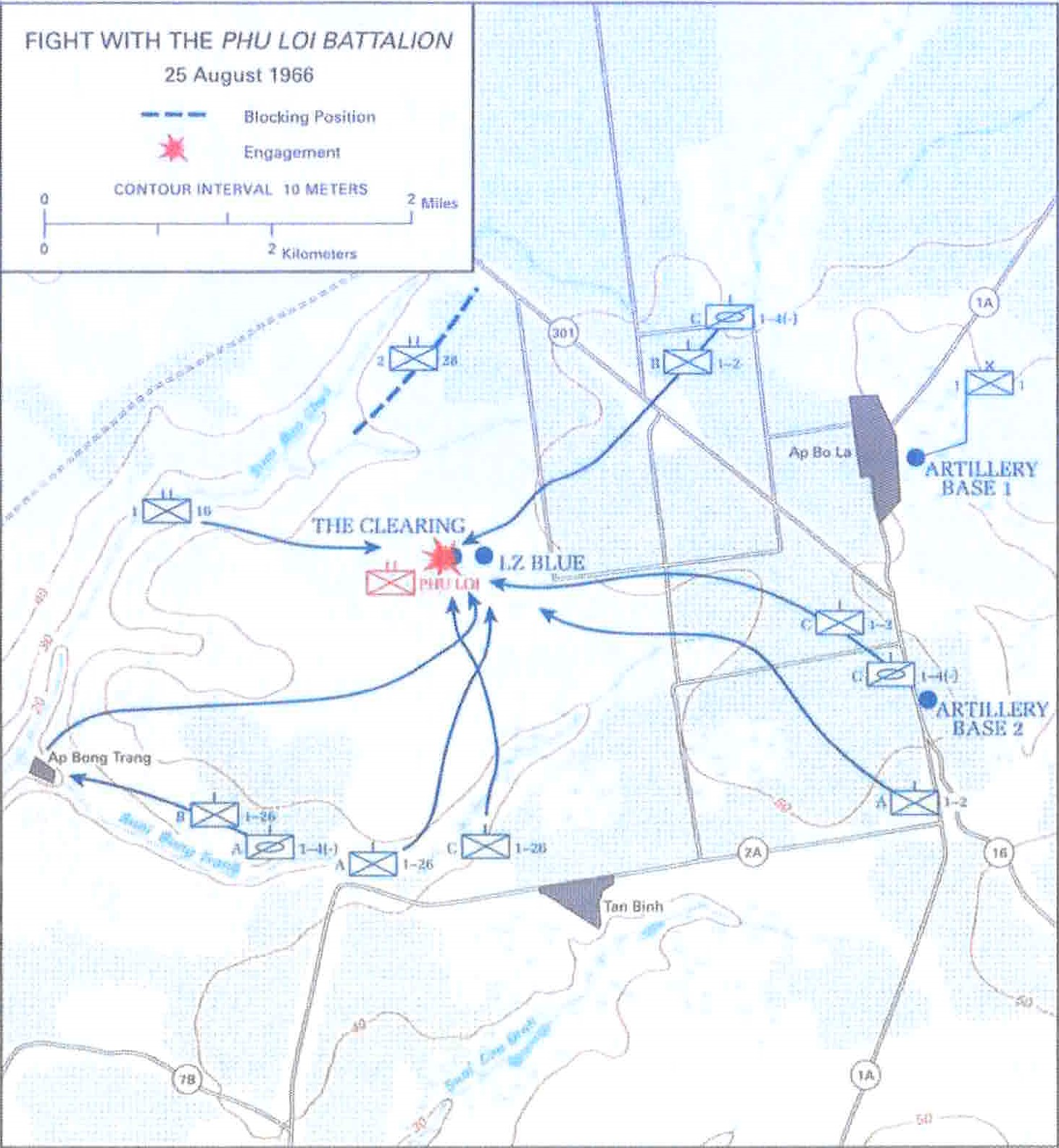
Operation Amarillo, 25 August 1966

On 23 and 24 August the two infantry battalions patrolled the surrounding areas without locating any Viet Cong presence. On the morning of 25 August following an overnight patrol, a 15-man unit from Company C 1/2nd Infantry began to move east to return to Firebase 1 when it was attacked by the Viet Cong Phu Loi Battalion and the local C62 Company. Unknown to the Americans their patrol had stumbled into a major Viet Cong base camp. The patrol took cover in a trenchline and radioed for support and the rest of Company C and 2nd Platoon, Troop C, 1st Squadron, 4th Cavalry Regiment were sent from Firebase 2 to assist them. The Viet Cong meanwhile had broken through the patrol's line and the commander called in artillery fire on their own position which broke up the attack, 9 members of the patrol took shelter in a bunker while the other members scattered.

At 08:30 Col. Sidney Berry ordered the two other companies from 1/2nd Infantry and the 1/26th Infantry to reinforce and later BG William E. DePuy ordered the 1st Battalion, 16th Infantry Regiment (1/16th Infantry) and the 2nd Battalion, 28th Infantry Regiment (2/28th Infantry) to deploy to the area from Lai Khê.

At 09:00 as the initial relief column approached the assumed location of the patrol, the Viet Cong attacked a platoon guarding a small clearing to the rear of the column. The M113s turned and moved back to the clearing to support the platoon, but were soon pinned down by intense fire from Vietcong hidden in the dense trees and brush surrounding the clearing.

Col. Berry then ordered Company A 1/2nd Infantry to move in from the southeast, Company B 1/2nd Infantry and Troop C 1/4th Cavalry to move in from the east, while Company C 1/26th Infantry came up from the south. 2/28th Infantry was landed by helicopter to the north, 1/16th Infantry was landed to the west and Companies A and B 1/26th Infantry and Troop A 1/4th Cavalry approached from the south. The approach of all units was delayed by dense jungle, wet ground and caution against further Viet Cong ambushes.

At 13:00 the Company B 1/2nd Infantry and Troop C 1/4th Cavalry column finally approached the clearing, but Company B which moved to clear the southeast was met by machine gun and mortar fire and four attacks on the Viet Cong positions were repulsed. Troop C's armor meanwhile was able to break through lighter Viet Cong fire and get into the clearing. The wounded were moved to Landing Zone (LZ) Blue which was established 400 metres to the east of the clearing. In order to establish centralized ground command over the intermingled units Col Berry ordered Major Richard Clark of 1/2nd Infantry to take command and establish a defensible perimeter. Major Clark's and Col. Berry's command helicopters landed at LZ Blue and they were discussing plans in the clearing when Major Clark was shot in the head by a Viet Cong sniper, killing him, Col. Berry then took direct command of the clearing, while his operations officer Maj. John Galvin assumed overall control of the battle.

By 15:15 the other units began to close in on the battlefield. Company B 1/26th Infantry and Troop A 1/4th Cavalry broke through the Viet Cong defensive line before being moved west to assist Company B 1/2nd Infantry. Meanwhile, the 1/16th Infantry attacked from the west of the clearing, finding abandoned Viet Cong camps before joining up with the US forces to the south of the clearing. 1/16th Infantry then turned north to attack the main body of the Viet Cong but their right flank was hit by Viet Cong machine gun and recoilless rifle fire from entrenched positions before the Viet Cong withdrew. Col. Berry handed command of the clearing to LCol. Paul Gorman and resumed command of the battle.

At dusk the US forces established 3 night defensive positions, one in the clearing, another of 1/16th Infantry 400 metres north and another further north. On the morning of 26 August Napalm strikes were ordered between the clearing and 1/16th Infantry, however one napalm canister fell short killing 2 Americans and wounding 14 others. The American forces then patrolled the surrounding areas but the Viet Cong had left the battlefield. The bodies of 6 members of the Company C 1/2nd Infantry night patrol were located, while the remaining 9 members had survived the battle and made their way to LZ Blue.

== Aftermath ==
Operation Amarillo officially concluded on 31 August. Total US casualties were 41 killed of which 34 were killed on 25 August, while VC losses were 99 killed, later intelligence indicated that VC losses were actually 171 killed. Col. Berry regarded the operation as a victory but stated that "We thrashed our way almost blindly into the enemy's base camp and fought him on his home ground under conditions favorable to him." The battle at the clearing on 25 August has subsequently been referred to as the Battle of Bong Trang, after a village to the southwest.
