= Long Nguyen Secret Zone =

Coordinates: 11.209°N 106.553°E

The Long Nguyen Secret Zone was a geographical area of the South Vietnam, a heavily-forested area located between Highway 13 and the Michelin Rubber Plantation about 56 kilometers (35 mi) northwest of Saigon, in Binh Duong Province that served as a Viet Cong divisional sanctuary.

It was the site of numerous military operations during the Vietnam War, including:

- Operation Bushmaster II
- Operation Shenandoah II
