= Candelario Garcia =

US war veteran and Medal of Honor recipient

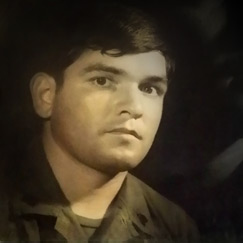
- Born: February 26, 1944; Corsicana, Texas
- Died: January 10, 2013 (aged 68); Corsicana, Texas
- Burial place: Dallas-Fort Worth National Cemetery, Dallas, Texas
- Military career
- Allegiance: United States of America
- Branch: United States Army
- Rank: Sergeant
- Units: Company B, 1st Battalion, 2nd Infantry Regiment, 1st Brigade, 1st Infantry Division
- Conflicts: Vietnam War
- Awards: Medal of Honor; Silver Star; Bronze Star Medal; Purple Heart; Air Medal

Candelario Garcia, Jr. (February 26, 1944 – January 10, 2013) was a United States Army veteran of the Vietnam War, and a recipient of the Medal of Honor.

== Biography ==
Garcia was born in Corsicana, Texas on February 26, 1944, of Mexican descent.

He enlisted in the U.S. Army on May 28, 1963, and his actions on December 8, 1968 while serving in Vietnam caused him to receive the Medal of Honor, posthumously, in 2014. Garcia died on January 10, 2013, aged 68, in his native Corsicana.

== Medal of Honor ==
Garcia distinguished himself on December 8, 1968, as a team leader during a reconnaissance-in-force mission near Lai Khê, Vietnam during Operation Toan Thang II. Garcia destroyed two enemy machine-gun positions in an attempt to aid casualties that were in the open and under fire, then rejoining his company in a successful assault on the remaining enemy positions. Garcia was originally awarded a Distinguished Service Cross on 4 April 1969 for this action. The award was rescinded on 18 March 2014 under Permanent Order 077-34.

He received the Medal of Honor, posthumously, from President Barack Obama in a March 18, 2014 White House ceremony. As Garcia had been a former "Big Red One" (1st Infantry Division) soldier, the 1st Infantry Division's Command Sgt. Maj. Michael A. Grinston received the medal on behalf of Garcia and his surviving family members. Garcia's surviving Family members had asked the division to represent him in the White House ceremony and the Pentagon ceremony inducting him into the Pentagon Hall of Heroes.

The award came through the Defense Authorization Act which called for a review of Jewish American and Hispanic American veterans from World War II, the Korean War and the Vietnam War to ensure that no prejudice was shown to those deserving the Medal of Honor.

=== Citation ===

The President of the United States of America, authorized by Act of Congress, July 9, 1918 (amended by act of July 25, 1963), takes pride in presenting the Medal of Honor (posthumously) to:

CANDELARIO GARCIA
United States Army

For conspicuous gallantry and intrepidity at the risk of his life above and beyond the call of duty:

Sergeant Candelario Garcia distinguished himself by acts of gallantry and intrepidity above and beyond the call of duty while serving as an acting Team Leader for Company B, 1st Battalion, 2d Infantry, 1st Brigade,1st Infantry Division during combat operations against an armed enemy in Lai Khe, Republic of Vietnam on December 8, 1968. On that day, while conducting reconnaissance, Sergeant Garcia and his platoon discovered communication wire and other signs of an enemy base camp leading into a densely vegetated area. As the men advanced, they came under intense fire. Several men were hit and trapped in the open. Ignoring a hail of hostile bullets, Sergeant Garcia crawled to within ten meters of a machinegun bunker, leaped to his feet and ran directly at the fortification, firing his rifle as he charged. Sergeant Garcia jammed two hand grenades into the gun port and then placed the muzzle of his weapon inside, killing all four occupants. Continuing to expose himself to intense enemy fire, Sergeant Garcia raced fifteen meters to another bunker and killed its three defenders with hand grenades and rifle fire. After again braving the enemies' barrage in order to rescue two casualties, he joined his company in an assault which overran the remaining enemy positions. Sergeant Garcia's extraordinary heroism and selflessness above and beyond the call of duty are in keeping with the highest traditions of military service and reflect great credit upon himself, his unit and the United States Army.

== Other honors, awards and decorations ==
Besides the Medal of Honor, Garcia received the Silver Star, Bronze Star Medal, Purple Heart, Air Medal, Army Commendation Medal with "V" Device and one Bronze Oak Leaf Cluster, Army Good Conduct Medal, National Defense Service Medal, Vietnam Service Medal with two Silver Service Stars and one Bronze Service Star, Meritorious Unit Commendation, Combat Infantryman Badge, Expert Marksmanship Badge with Rifle, Republic of Vietnam Gallantry Cross with Silver Star, Republic of Vietnam Campaign Medal with "60" Device, Republic of Vietnam Gallantry Cross Unit Citations with Palm Device and Republic of Vietnam Civil Actions Honor Medal Unit Citation, First Class

== See also ==
- List of Medal of Honor recipients for the Vietnam War
