= Dallas–Fort Worth National Cemetery =

Veterans cemetery in Dallas County, Texas

Dallas-Fort Worth National Cemetery
- Interactive map of Dallas-Fort Worth National Cemetery

Details
- Established: 2000
- Location: Dallas, Texas
- Country: United States
- Coordinates: 32°43′00″N 96°56′20″W
- Type: United States National Cemetery
- Owned by: U.S. Department of Veterans Affairs
- Size: 638 acres (258 ha)
- No. of graves: 73,000+
- Website: Official
- Find a Grave: Dallas-Fort Worth National Cemetery

Dallas–Fort Worth National Cemetery is a United States national cemetery located in the city of Dallas, Dallas County, Texas (United States). Administered by the United States Department of Veterans Affairs, it encompasses 638 acres (258 ha), and as of 2021, had over 73,000 interments.

== History ==
Dallas–Fort Worth National Cemetery was established in 2000 on the eastern shore of Mountain Creek Lake north of Dallas Baptist University. It is the sixth National Cemetery created in Texas and was created to meet the future needs of American veterans, nearly 1.5 million of whom live in the state of Texas. It currently has space for over 280,000 interments. It already serves as the resting place for several soldiers who have died in the Iraq War and War in Afghanistan (2001–2021).

== Notable interments ==
- Medal of Honor recipients
  - Candelario Garcia (1944–2013), for action in the Vietnam War
  - James L. Stone (1922–2012), for action in the Korean War
- Others
  - Mac Curtis (1939–2013), Rockabilly musician
  - Earl Lunsford (1933–2008), professional football player and executive
  - Glenn McDuffie (1927–2014), US Navy sailor known for being the subject of the V-J Day in Times Square photograph
  - Pat Summerall (1930–2013), American football player and television sportscaster
  - Jim Swink (1936–2014), American football halfback
  - Royce Womble (1931–2016), American football running back
  - Patrick Zamarripa (1983–2016), US Navy sailor and Dallas Police officer killed in the line of duty in the 2016 shooting of Dallas police officers
