= Operation Airborne Dragon =

2003 American military operation in Iraq

- Part of Operation Iraqi Freedom
Date	7–10 April 2003
Location	Bashur Airbase, Iraq
Result	Coalition Victory

Belligerents
United States	(Ba'athist Iraq) Republic of Iraq

Commanders and leaders
Lt. Col. Ken Riddle	

Strength
First Wave: 173rd Airborne Brigade Reinforcements: Task Force 1-63: 1st Battalion, 63rd Armor Regiment 5 M1A1 main battle tanks 5 M2 Bradley infantry fighting vehicles 5+ M113 armoured personnel carriers Military Police Company Combat Service Support Platoon 1 Battalion command post	Local Defences: Unknown Regional Defences: 6 Iraqi Army and Republican Guard Divisions

Casualties and losses
US Unknown ? Equipment: Unknown ?	Iraqi Heavy Equipment: Multiple of tanks and armoured vehicles.
- The first expeditionary insertion of a U.S. armored force into combat by air.

Operation Airborne Dragon was a part of Operation Northern Delay in the 2003 invasion of Iraq. US airborne troops seized Bashur air base in northern Iraq, and were then reinforced by air with tanks and infantry fighting vehicles. The combined force held the airfield until the arrival of ground forces.

On 7 April 2003, Task Force 1-63 landed 5 M1A1 tanks, 5 Bradley Fighting Vehicles, and a battalion command post at Bashur Airfield in northern Iraq. Much of the Iraqi military capitulated 3 days later.

== Units involved ==
The US forces were mostly made up of the 1st Battalion, 63rd Armor Regiment, a subordinate unit of the 3rd Brigade Combat Team, 1st Infantry Division.

== Operation ==
On 26 March 2003 US Air Force C-17 Globemaster III flew from Aviano AB, Italy to Bashur Airbase in Northern Iraq and deployed 950 paratroopers from the 173rd Airborne Brigade, who then proceeded to secure the airbase. The airmobile force initially faced no resistance from the Iraqi army as it didn't have any units it could deploy to face the Americans. Once the airbase was secure US forces Two days later, American soldiers from the 501st Forward Support Company, and the 173d Airborne Brigade's, Supply Support Activity (SSA) arrived at Bashur Airfield.

On 7 April 2003 Task Force 1-63 was transported from Europe to Bashur Airbase along with 5 M1A1 tanks, 5 Bradley Fighting Vehicles, and a battalion command post with satellite communications at Bashur Airbase transported by C-17 Globemaster III as the reinforcements to the 173rd Airborne Brigade that had parachuted in earlier to secure the airbase from the Iraqi army. Once the airbase was secure the US airmobile forces and IRTF soldiers crushed organised Iraqi resistance in the north of the country by 10 April.

== Aftermath ==
Operation Airborne Dragon shortened Operation Iraqi Freedom and saved the lives of many coalition soldiers. This was due to the fact that the deployment of coalition forces alongside Peshmerga troops in the north of Iraq forced the Iraqi Government to keep six divisions of Iraqi army in the north instead of being able to deploy them in the south to face the rapidly advancing U.S. led coalition.
