= The Devil's Alternative =

Book by Frederick Forsyth

- First edition
- Author: Frederick Forsyth
- Language: English
- Genre: Thriller
- Publisher: Hutchinson
- Publication date: 1979
- Publication place: United Kingdom
- Media type: Print (Hardback & Paperback)
- Pages: 478
- ISBN: 0-09-138870-8

The Devil's Alternative is a novel by British writer Frederick Forsyth first published in 1979. It was his fourth full-length novel and marked a new direction in his work, setting the story in the near-future (in 1982) rather than in the recent past. The work evolved from an unfilmed screenplay entitled No Alternative.

== Plot summary ==
The story opens with the discovery of a castaway in the Black Sea. Recovering in hospital in Turkey, the man is visited by Andrew Drake, an Anglo-Ukrainian. The castaway, Miroslav Kaminsky (Ukr. Мирослав Камінський), is a Ukrainian nationalist who escaped after he was betrayed to the KGB. Drake convinces Kaminsky that they should strike a blow against the Soviet Union. Kaminsky tells Drake about Lev Mishkin and David Lazareff, two Ukrainian Jewish nationalists who have suffered lifetimes of abuse and discrimination by the anti-Semitic Soviet authorities and are ready to take any actions that strike against the USSR.

Meanwhile, a chain of failures at the Soviet Union's plant that makes fungicide for wheat has led to the inadvertent poisoning of the wheat crop. The United States is aware of this crisis and plans to sell its food to the Soviets in exchange for political and military concessions. Hardliners in the Politburo, led by Soviet Army Marshal Kerensky and Party theoretician Vishnayev come up with a different strategy: to take the food by conquering Western Europe, insisting on ideological rather than factual grounds that the West (particularly the U.S.) will accept defeat and the resulting long-term victory of the Soviets over them rather than resort to nuclear war. Chairman Maxim Rudin, while a hard-line Communist who has ruled with an iron hand for a long time, knows that the pro-war faction's plan would result in an all-out nuclear war because the West would otherwise be vassals on a planet dominated by the Soviet bloc. However, Rudin is dying of cancer and knows that he is running out of time to prevent the faction from ousting him and starting World War III.

The news of the war plan comes to British intelligence agent Adam Munro through a Russian woman, his former lover Valentina, who works in the Kremlin offices and has access to the records of Politburo debates. The information shakes both the British and U.S. political leadership.

Mishkin and Lazareff, with the help of Drake, complicate the situation for Rudin by assassinating Yuri Ivanenko, his ally in the Politburo and the chief of the KGB. While the Politburo covers up the truth of Ivanenko's death, Mishkin and Lazareff hijack a Soviet airliner to escape from Ukraine but are arrested in West Berlin after one of the pilots is shot dead during landing. Drake needs the two men released because only they can reveal that the Soviet government could not protect one of its most powerful leaders, thus triggering nationalist uprisings in Ukraine and other Soviet republics. Drake and other Westerners of Ukrainian origin hijack the world's largest oil supertanker in the North Sea and demand the extradition of Mishkin and Lazareff to Israel, threatening to vent 1,000,000 tons of oil if this condition is not met. The coastal countries threatened by this ecological catastrophe support the release of the prisoners.

U.S. President Bill Matthews receives information from the British that the USSR will cease negotiations regarding grain and military concessions if the prisoners are released, so there appear to be only two potential outcomes: the greatest oil spill in history, or a Soviet invasion of western Europe. Thus Matthews is faced with the "Devil's Alternative" of the title: no matter which course of action he pursues, massive loss of life is guaranteed. Munro eventually devises a third option which enables the prisoners to be released (thus ending the oil tanker standoff) and then quietly executed without them being able to reveal that they have assassinated the KGB chief. Kaminsky, who is waiting in Israel to confirm the two prisoners' release, is cornered by Israeli police and commits suicide, believing himself hunted by the KGB again. Drake and his team are killed after escaping the supertanker while Vishnayev is dismissed from the Politburo in disgrace, ending the threat of war.

In the epilogue, Rudin proclaims a relative moderate (someone who believes that the Soviet Union will eventually rule the world but will do so gradually and without resorting to nuclear weapons) from the peace faction as his successor. After the ceremony he privately reveals to a shocked Munro that Valentina had been working for him all along, feeding Munro and the Western governments the information they needed to defuse the crisis and avert war. He informs Munro that Valentina is genuinely fond of him, but not so romantically attached as to abandon her homeland for him. Walking outside, free to begin a new life outside the service, Munro begins laughing at himself—a veteran spy taken in by the oldest espionage trick in history: false love.

== Background ==
In 1975 Forsyth sold an original screenplay entitled No Alternative - about "a supertanker being held for ransom" - to film producer Lew Grade who had also purchased film rights to Forsyth's The Shepherd. Grade paid Forsyth US$150,000 for the work plus a percentage of the gross. Martin Starger and Paramount Pictures would co-produce the film. No film was made.

== References to real people ==
The novel features many real-life people with their names disguised; British Prime Minister Joan Carpenter is Margaret Thatcher (who had only recently become the PM at the time the novel was published); American president William "Bill" Matthews is James "Jimmy" Carter (although the fictional Matthews is finishing up his 2nd term of office in the book, while Carter was nearing the end of his 1st and only Presidential term in 1979); his Polish National Security Advisor Stanislaw Poklewski is Zbigniew Brzezinski; and Secretary of State David Lawrence is Cyrus Vance. Margaret Thatcher would later appear as herself in The Fourth Protocol, The Negotiator, The Fist of God, A Little Bit of Sunshine and Icon.
