= The Veteran (short story collection) =

2001 short story collection by Frederick Forsyth

- Author: Frederick Forsyth
- Language: English
- Genre: Crime fiction
- Publisher: Thomas Dunne Books
- Publication date: 2001
- Publication place: United Kingdom
- Media type: Print (hardback & paperback), e-book, audiobook
- Pages: 228 (hardcover)
- ISBN: 0312286910
- Preceded by: The Phantom of Manhattan
- Followed by: Avenger

The Veteran is a short story collection by British author Frederick Forsyth. The book was first published on 8 September 2001, through Thomas Dunne Books and includes five of Forsyth's short stories. This is the second short story collection by the author, following the release of his 1982 collection, No Comebacks.

== Stories ==
- "The Veteran"

An unidentified elderly man is kicked half to death by a pair of thugs in London in a mugging gone wrong (when he resists and injures one of them badly). The police identify and apprehend the pair. By then the elderly man has succumbed to his injuries in hospital, but with the evidence and testimony available, the prosecution is certain of life imprisonment for the two criminals. But they are acquitted when a Queen's Counsel approaches the solicitor of the two accused men and becomes their Legal Aid barrister for no apparent reason, winning the case. Cryptically, after the judgement has been read out, the attorney ignores his clients and shakes the hand of the inspector leading the police investigation, who angrily brushes it off saying that he hopes the QC is proud of himself: they killed that old man and thanks to him they would be at liberty to repeat their crimes. The advocate responds whispering that it may surprise the inspector, "but it has to do with the triumph of justice". Soon after the dismissal of the case, the detectives identify the dead man as a former SAS paratrooper who served in "The Battle of Mirbat", Oman. Shockingly, they discover that the very same Queen's Counselor who argued and won the dismissal of the two thugs was the commanding officer of the dead man in that same battle, together fending off an attack of 300-400 men and forming a tight-knit bond for life, among the soldiers and officer. Realization dawns on the detectives and soon, they realize the two thugs would now meet a fate worse than life imprisonment. And sure enough, a few weeks later, the bodies of the two men are found at the bottom of a lake, strangled by piano wire, in a case that is eventually left unsolved and unclosed: the justice referred to by the QC was not that of the Old Bailey but of the Old Testament.

- "The Art of the Matter"

A down-on-his-luck actor whose career has been made up of never-ending bit parts decides to sell an antique oil painting left to him by a great-aunt who had worked as a housekeeper in a stately home. After being numbered and filed away, the painting unexpectedly catches the eye of an apprentice assistant in an art gallery, who brings it to the notice of an arrogant peer who works as a representative for an auction house. When the peer muscles everyone else out of the sale of the painting - discrediting and blackballing the assistant in the process - the actor, the assistant, and the assistant's hacker girlfriend conspire to take him down and get their revenge. Recruiting an aging and alcoholic art forger into the scheme, the hacker taps into the auction house's communication network and helps the assistant to slip a series of forged paintings through the auction house while concealing genuine artworks from their records, and the actor impersonates the relevant sellers and bidders, swindling the peer into losing genuine bids and buying the forgeries at inflated prices: the conspirators later skim the proceeds of the sales before the forgeries are eventually exposed, besmirching the reputation of the auction house and leaving the peer dismissed and disgraced.

- "The Miracle"

In Siena for the '75 Palio, an American tourist couple quite literally stumbles into an abandoned church when the wife injures her leg. An aged gardener tends to her injury and explains the history of the church, revealing himself to be a former Wehrmacht surgeon who witnessed the ghost of a nun tending to the wounded during the fall of Italy in the Second World War. But is it truly a legend or does something else lie beneath?

- "The Citizen"

On a long flight from Thailand to London, the world of drug trafficking sends threads through the skies as three different passengers in three different sections suspect each other of carrying the dangerous contraband. It turns out in the end that all three were carrying drugs on them, and in a surprising twist, the most obvious suspect was a deep cover operative.

- "Whispering Wind"

A hitherto unknown sole survivor from the Battle of Little Bighorn crosses through time to reunite with the woman he loves.

== Publication ==
The stories were originally published individually online by the company Online Originals under the collective title Quintet, before being collected into a single volume as The Veteran.

== Reception ==
Critical reception has been mixed. The Guardian panned The Veteran, writing "Paper-thin plots and cardboard characters from the self-styled world's greatest storyteller". Christopher Petit reckoned Forsyth was a relic of bygone times, calling it "polished and moribund as a joke at an after-dinner speech, with a ponderous twist, a punchline and a little moral to tie it all up". The BBC was mixed, stating that "This collection is tautly written and practically boasts of the deep level of research that underpins it. But the storytelling itself has mixed results - perhaps too mixed to convince a first-time reader of Forsyth's reputation as the thriller writer's thriller writer."

The Daily Telegraph was more positive in their review, as they felt that Forsyth had fun writing the work and that while some of the stories were weaker than the others, they were all "highly readable".
