= Death Has a Bad Reputation =

- DVD cover
- Genre: Action Thriller
- Written by: Murray Smith
- Story by: Frederick Forsyth
- Directed by: Lawrence Gordon Clark
- Starring: Tony Lo Bianco; Pamela Villoresi; Elizabeth Hurley
- Music by: Paul Chihara
- Country of origin: United Kingdom
- Original language: English

Production
- Executive producers: Frederick Forsyth; Nick Elliott; Murray Smith
- Producer: Frederick Muller
- Cinematography: Cristiano Pogany
- Editor: Alan Pattillo
- Running time: 98 minutes
- Production company: FremantleMedia for LWT

Original release
- Network: ITV
- Release: 24 November 1990

Death Has a Bad Reputation is a 1990 British made-for-television action thriller film based on a story by Frederick Forsyth starring Tony Lo Bianco, Pamela Villoresi and Elizabeth Hurley. It was originally broadcast 24 November 1990 in the UK on ITV as part of Frederick Forsyth Presents, a series of six thriller films based on stories by Forsyth.

== Synopsis ==
A British agent chases after notorious international terrorist Ilich Ramírez Sánchez, known as "Carlos the Jackal", when he resurfaces in Europe. Intelligence networks worldwide are involved when Donatini, a United States Department of State employee, is assassinated.

== Cast ==
- Tony Lo Bianco as Carlos
- Pamela Villoresi as Antonella
- Elizabeth Hurley as Julia Latham
- Gottfried John as Rodimstev
- Alan Howard as Sam McCready
- Venantino Venantini as Umberto Aidoni
- David Lyon as Patrick Cowlishaw
- Richard Hope as Spry
- Garrick Hagon as Stephen T. Hamilton
- Philip Lowrie as Superintendent Jamieson
- Nancy Lippold as Patricia

Gino Donatini as Roberto Renna
