= Rupert Sanders =

English filmmaker (born 1971)

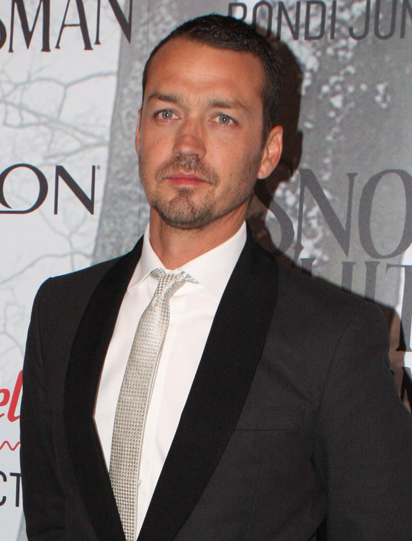
- Sanders in 2012
- Born: Rupert Miles Sanders; 16 March 1971 (age 55); London, England
- Occupation: Film director
- Years active: 1999–present
- Notable work: Snow White and the Huntsman; Ghost in the Shell; The Crow
- Spouse: Liberty Ross (m. 2002; div. 2014)
- Children: 2

Rupert Miles Sanders (born 16 March 1971) is an English film director. Sanders directed the films Snow White and the Huntsman (2012), Ghost in the Shell (2017), and The Crow (2024). He also directed the pilot episode of the Apple TV+ science fiction series Foundation.

== Early life ==
Sanders was born in Westminster, London, the eldest son of Thalia (née Garlick) and hospital ophthalmologist Michael Sanders. After a foundation year at Kingston School of Art he graduated with a degree in graphic design from Central St Martins.

== Career ==
Sanders began his commercial production career under Tony Kaye. He had primarily done art direction before Kaye suggested he try out directing. Sanders has directed numerous television advertisements, including The Life for Halo 3: ODST, which won him two Golden Lions at the Cannes Lions International Advertising Festival. By September 2007, Sanders was attached to direct a remake of The Wild Geese (1978).

Sanders' first feature film was Snow White and the Huntsman, which was released in the US in early June 2012. The film's budget was $170 million, including an eight-figure marketing expenditure, and it earned $20.3 million on its opening day in the US. To date, the film has grossed $396,592,829 at the box office.

After passing the offer to direct the fifth instalment of the Pirates of the Caribbean film series, Sanders directed a film adaptation of science fiction manga franchise Ghost in the Shell, with Avi Arad and Steven Paul producing and Scarlett Johansson starring in the main role. It was released in late March 2017.

In March 2017, Sanders expressed interest in a sequel to Ghost in the Shell. Due to the film's box office failure, talks for a sequel were abandoned.

In June 2018, Sanders was announced to be directing Johansson again in Rub & Tug, a planned biopic about Dante "Tex" Gill and his girlfriend Cynthia Bruno, with Johansson starring as Gill. However, the film has been left in development hell after Johansson stepped down from starring in the film when the transgender community criticised having a female actress play a trans man.

Sanders directed the 2024 reboot film The Crow, with Bill Skarsgård starring as Eric / The Crow.

== Personal life ==
Sanders married model Liberty Ross, sister of musician Atticus Ross, in 2002. They moved to Los Angeles to further Sanders' career. Together they have two children, daughter Skyla and son Tennyson. In July 2012, Us Weekly published photos of Sanders in an intimate embrace and kissing with actress Kristen Stewart, prompting Sanders and Stewart to issue separate public apologies. Ross subsequently filed for divorce from Sanders in January 2013, seeking joint custody, spousal support, and legal fees. The divorce was finalised on 30 May 2014.

== Filmography ==
Film

Year	Title	Distribution
2012	Snow White and the Huntsman	Universal Pictures
2017	Ghost in the Shell	Paramount Pictures
2024	The Crow *	Lionsgate

* Also credited as executive producer

Television

Year	Title	Episode
2021	Foundation	"The Emperor's Peace"

Music video

Year	Title	Artist	Notes
1999	"Slam Dunk (Da Funk)"	Five	Co-directed with Lawrence Watson
2010	"The Space in Between"	How to Destroy Angels	

Unrealized projects

- The Wild Geese, a remake of the 1978 film
- The Low Dweller, later released as Out of the Furnace and directed by Scott Cooper
- 90 Church, a film about the Federal Bureau of Narcotics, based on the memoir by former agent Dean Unkefer and adapted by George Mastras
- Van Helsing, a reboot of the 2004 film starring Tom Cruise and written by Roberto Orci and Alex Kurtzman
- The Juliet, based on the short story by Alfred Bester, adapted by Henry Bean and rewritten by Paul Haggis
- The Kill List, based on the novel by Frederick Forsyth
- Napoleon, a biography on Napoleon written by Jeremy Doner
- The Things They Carried, an adaptation of the book by Tim O'Brien and adapted by Scott B. Smith. The film had an ensemble cast consisting of Tom Hardy (who would also produce), Tye Sheridan, Stephan James, Bill Skarsgård, Pete Davidson, Ashton Sanders, Martin Sensmeier, Moisés Arias, and Angus Cloud.

Shortlisted

- The Hunger Games
- Edge of Tomorrow
- Pirates of the Caribbean: Dead Men Tell No Tales
- Deadpool 2
- Venom: Let There Be Carnage
