= Icon (novel) =

1996 novel by Frederick Forsyth

- First edition (UK)
- Author: Frederick Forsyth
- Language: English
- Genre: Thriller
- Publisher: Bantam Press
- Publication date: 1996
- Publication place: United Kingdom
- Media type: Print (hardback and paperback)
- ISBN: 978-0-553-57460-9

Icon is a thriller novel by British author Frederick Forsyth. Its plot centres on the politics of the Russian Federation in 1999, with an extremist party close to seizing power. Published by Bantam Press in September 1997, (ISBN 978-0-553-57460-9), Icon became a New York Times Bestseller and was adapted into a television film.

== Plot ==
Set between July 1999 and January 2000, the story revolves around Russian presidential candidate Igor Komarov, head of the right-wing Union of Patriotic Forces (UPF).

A popular and charismatic politician, victory is all but guaranteed for Komarov and the UPF in the national elections on 16 January 2000. However, a secret document, later known as the "Black Manifesto", is stolen from his secretary's empty office at UPF headquarters by Leonid Zaitsev, an elderly janitor and ex-soldier who happens to skim through the document while cleaning. The document contains extremely sensitive information regarding Komarov's future policies as president, such as the restoration of slave camps, creation of a one-party state, destruction of political opponents, invasions of the former Soviet republics, and genocide of Russia's ethnic and religious minorities.

Komarov's team capture and kill Zaitsev, but not before he gives the document to the British, who later translate it and show it to influential Western leaders. Sir Nigel Irvine, former head of the SIS, comes up with a plan to thwart Komarov's victory. Searching for a suitable man to carry out this plan, former CIA Deputy Director of Operations Carey Jordan recommends Jason Monk, a former recruiter and runner of Soviet agents for the CIA and Vietnam War veteran.

In parts of the novel, there are flashbacks to earlier years, detailing Monk's background and recruitment of several Soviets as US agents. These include government figures and a physicist. However, CIA mole Aldrich Ames soon betrays these agents, along with all other CIA agents in the Soviet Union. Nearly all are rounded up by the Soviets, and are either executed or sentenced to hard labour after lengthy interrogation and torture by the ruthless Anatoli Grishin.

Colonel Nikolai Ilyich Turkin, the first Soviet to be recruited by Monk, develops a close friendship with him after Monk saves his son from dying of a tropical disease. He is, however, the last CIA agent caught by the Soviets, with Grishin supervising the capture in Berlin as Monk watches close by after their last meeting. Turkin is interrogated and sent to a labour camp. There, dying of typhoid, he pens a letter to Monk detailing his interrogation and torture at the camps, and bids a final farewell. Monk, filled with anger and grief, attacks a bureaucrat known to have aided Ames, and this leads to his dismissal from the CIA.

In 1999, he leads a quiet life in the Turks and Caicos Islands, taking tourists on fishing trips. Irvine visits him and talks about the plan against Komarov; Monk refuses, having sworn never to return to Russia, but agrees when he is given the chance to take revenge on Grishin, who is working as Komarov's security chief.

He returns to Russia and rounds up a ring of influential figures to his cause by showing them the "Black Manifesto", and, with the aid of the Chechen mafia, whose leader owes Monk his life, he begins a series of schemes aimed at derailing Igor Komarov's presidential campaign.

== Background ==
The book features real-life double agent Aldrich Ames as a character. Ames, a Central Intelligence Agency operative, had exchanged secrets to Soviet agents for money; his actions figure in the plot of Icon. Several real-life political figures are also characters in the story as members of the "Council of Lincoln," a secret group of influential world leaders, and the plot features them having an annual conference at a member's ranch in Jackson, Wyoming.

The endgame of the plot involves installing a personified icon to help ensure stability in Russia without having to resort to ultranationalism or a return to Communism. A subplot in the novel involves Sir Nigel Irvine working with a noted expert in Russian royal history to find the new Tsar in preparation for the restoration of the Russian monarchy. After extensive research, Prince Michael of Kent (unnamed in the novel, but safely identifiable thanks to several key biographic details and personal characteristics) as the leading candidate, based on affiliation to the Orthodox faith and biological connection to Greek royals and Russian Romanovs. He agrees to take up the post, pending on the consent of the Russian people and Queen Elizabeth II, and eventually assumes the throne in early 2000.

The novel can be seen as a continuation of Forsyth's previous novel, The Fist of God; one of the minor characters in Icon, a banker named Nathanson, is described as the father of a pilot who was shot down in the closing hours of the 1991 Persian Gulf War, an event that occurs in Fist. Irvine had previously appeared in The Devil's Alternative and The Fourth Protocol.

== Film adaptation ==
In 2005 a film loosely based on the book was made, starring Patrick Swayze as Jason Monk.
