= Kill List (disambiguation) =

Kill List is a 2011 psychological horror crime film.

Kill List may also refer to:

- Disposition Matrix, a database of enemies of the United States
- The Kill List, a novel by Frederick Forsyth
- "Kill List" (Succession), an episode of the television series Succession
