= The Shepherd (2023 film) =

2023 film by Iain Softley

- Release poster
- Directed by: Iain Softley
- Written by: Iain Softley
- Based on: The Shepherd by Frederick Forsyth
- Produced by: Alfonso Cuarón; Richard Johns; Bill Kenwright; Gabriela Rodríguez
- Starring: Ben Radcliffe; Steven Mackintosh; John Travolta
- Cinematography: John Mathieson
- Edited by: Gareth C. Scales
- Music by: Anne Chmelewsky
- Production companies: Esperanto Filmoj; BKStudios; Argo Films
- Distributed by: Disney+
- Release dates: August 10, 2023 (HollyShorts Film Festival); December 1, 2023
- Running time: 39 minutes
- Country: United Kingdom
- Language: English

The Shepherd is a 2023 British drama short film written and directed by Iain Softley. It starred Ben Radcliffe and John Travolta, the latter serving as an executive producer of the film. It is based on the 1975 book by Frederick Forsyth. The film was released on Disney+ video streaming service on 1 December, 2023.

== Plot ==
On Christmas Eve 1957, Flying Officer Freddie Hook, who is stationed at RAF Celle air base in Lower Saxony, West Germany, is downcast at being unable to visit his family owing to his leave being denied. He discovers that his wingman, who had been granted leave, is barred from flying as a consequence of an arm injury sustained during a snowball fight. Seizing the opportunity, he moves to take the latter's place and proceeds to secure permission from his commanding officer to fly home overnight, despite having received his night rating only recently. With an hour's flying-time to RAF Lakenheath aerodrome, Suffolk and no inclement weather condition for the night, he is cleared to fly.

Taking off in his de Havilland Vampire, Freddie is ordered onto course heading 265° at flight level 280 over the North Sea, whereupon RAF Celle's air traffic control (ATC) shuts down for the night. Moments after exiting landfall, the Vampire suffers multiple-instrument failure, leaving Freddie stranded without navigational guidance. After several attempts to contact RAF Lakenheath for a radio-guided approach fail, he plans a detour to RAF Miriam St George, located near the coast. With heavy fog setting in, Freddie attempts a last resort by flying a triangular distress pattern in the hopes of being located on radar.

Flying low on fuel, and believing a sea ditch is inevitable, Freddie reminisces past memories with his girlfriend, Lizzie, before writing a final note to her. After flying through an aurora, he notices a nearby plane flying just below him and attempts to contact it. Inching closer to the plane, he identifies it as a de Havilland Mosquito, but is unable to make radio contact with it. The Mosquito pilot, who is able to contact Freddie, asks if he requires assistance, to which he responds using hand signals. Acknowledging him, the pilot guides him with a steady descent through the fog to a nearby base, before breaking off. After landing the plane safely, he shares a salute with the pilot, who disappears into the fog.

On the ground, Freddie encounters Sergeant Joe Marks, the base's lone officer, who informs him that he had landed at RAF Minton, an abandoned airfield just ten miles short of Miriam St George. Taking sanctuary in the officers' mess, Marks informs him that the base used to be a centre for fighter missions during the Second World War. There, Freddie notices a picture of the Mosquito pilot, whom Marks identifies as John Kavanagh, a Canadian RAF Pathfinder pilot who flew solo patrols to assist stranded pilots after target-marking flights. When Freddie notes to Marks that Kavanagh had guided him into RAF Minton, Marks replies that Kavanagh went missing in action during a patrol on Christmas Eve, 1943.

A bewildered Freddie is approached by two airmen from Miriam St George, who had driven down to RAF Minton after noticing his Vampire on radar. When he highlights Marks's help, they inform him that no one has occupied the airfield for years. Astounded, he looks up the clear sky before leaving the base.

The scene shifts to a rising horizon, where Kavanagh is seen contacting another stranded pilot. An ending note highlights the role of guide-pilots in saving the lives of countless fighter pilots returning from missions during the war.

== Cast ==
- Ben Radcliffe as Freddie Hook
- Steven Mackintosh as Sgt Joe Marks
- John Travolta as Johnny Kavanagh
- Iwan Bond as Dashwood
- Claire Price as Mum / Jenny
- Scarlett Grace as Sally
- Simon Wilson as S.S.O.
- Millie Kent as Lizzie
- Simon Lennon as Jack
- Olatunji Ayofe as Jim / Controller

== Production ==
Principal photography occurred in Raynham Hangar Studios in West Raynham, Norfolk in April 2022. In December 2022, it was announced that the film was "completed".

== Release ==
The Shepherd premiered at the HollyShorts Film Festival on 10 August, 2023, and was released through Disney+ on 1 December, 2023.
