= The Odessa File (film) =

1974 British-German film by Ronald Neame

- Film poster by Bill Gold; Illustration by Howard Terpning
- Directed by: Ronald Neame
- Screenplay by: Kenneth Ross; George Markstein
- Based on: The Odessa File by Frederick Forsyth
- Produced by: John Woolf; John R. Sloan
- Starring: Jon Voight; Mary Tamm; Maximilian Schell; Maria Schell
- Cinematography: Oswald Morris
- Edited by: Ralph Kemplen
- Music by: Andrew Lloyd Webber
- Production companies: John Woolf Productions; Domino Productions; Oceanic Filmproduktion
- Distributed by: Columbia Pictures
- Release date: 18 October 1974
- Running time: 128 minutes
- Countries: United Kingdom; West Germany
- Language: English
- Box office: $6 million (North American rentals)

The Odessa File is a 1974 thriller film, adapted from the 1972 novel of the same name by Frederick Forsyth, about a reporter's investigation into the ODESSA: an organisation set up to protect former members of the SS in post-Second World War West Germany. The film stars Jon Voight, Mary Tamm, Maximilian Schell and Maria Schell and was directed by Ronald Neame, with a score by Andrew Lloyd Webber. It was the only film that the Schell siblings made together.

== Plot ==
On 22 November 1963, Peter Miller, a freelance reporter in Hamburg, West Germany, pulls his car over to listen to a radio report on the John F. Kennedy assassination and notices an ambulance pass. He follows the ambulance and discovers it is en route to pick up the body of an elderly man who has committed suicide, leaving behind no family. Peter obtains the man's diary and learns the man was Salomon Tauber, a Jewish Holocaust survivor. Salomon's diary details information on his life in the Riga Ghetto during World War II and details the crimes of the SS officer who ran the camp, Eduard Roschmann, including the murder of a highly decorated Wehrmacht officer who tried to flee at the end of the war.

Peter resolves to hunt Roschmann down, and meets famed Nazi-hunter Simon Wiesenthal, who informs him about ODESSA, a secret organization for former members of the SS which is developing a missile guidance system for Nasserist Egypt. Wiesenthal warns that most of the Hamburg Police are members of ODESSA and not to be trusted. When Peter is accosted by Mossad agents who suspect him of trying to harm Wiesenthal, Peter convinces them his true mission is to bring Roschmann to justice. The Israelis propose sending Peter deep undercover inside ODESSA, and Peter agrees, adopting the identity of a former SS soldier who died in hospital recently.

Peter succeeds in infilgrating ODESSA and is sent to get a fake passport from a forger. While awaiting his train, Peter phones his girlfriend Sigi to assure her that he is OK. The ODESSA group use the call to work out that Peter is not who he says he is and dispatch an assassin to kill him. Peter meets the forger Klaus Wenzer, a shy, insecure man living with his mother, who tells Peter to return after the weekend to take passport photos. Peter leaves, and Klaus calls a few hours later, just after midnight, to tell him to return within the hour.

Suspicious, Peter rings Klaus' home from his hotel, but gets no answer and cautiously travels to the house in person, spotting the armed assassin waiting for him. Peter sneaks inside, and wakes Klaus' mother who mistakes him for a priest and begs him to pray for her son. He fights with the assassin and kills him, then searches Klaus' safe. Inside is the ODESSA file, detailing every fake ID Klaus created and who he created them for. Peter hides the file in a railway station locker.

Peter tells the Israelis all he has found but refuses to disclose the location of the file until Roschmann has been apprehended. The Israeli agents reluctantly agree to Peter's demands. Peter finds Roschmann living an opulent life as a munitions factory owner. He accesses the mansion and evades security, then confronts Roschmann at gunpoint. Peter reveals Salomon Tauber's diary to Roschmann, who denies everything. Peter shares Salomon's description of the murder of the Wehrmacht officer and reveals that officer was Peter's father. Roschmann goes for Peter's gun, and he shoots Roschmann.

The ODESSA files are used to arrest numerous Nazi war criminals, including high-ranking members of the police. Roschmann's factory mysteriously burns to the ground before any rockets are delivered to Egypt.

== Cast ==
- Jon Voight as Peter Miller
- Mary Tamm as Sigi
- Maximilian Schell as Eduard Roschmann
- Maria Schell as Frau Miller
- Derek Jacobi as Klaus Wenzer
- Peter Jeffrey as David Porath
- Towje Kleiner as Saloman Tauber
- Klaus Löwitsch as Gustav Mackensen
- Miriam Mahler as Esther Tauber (uncredited)
- Kurt Meisel as Alfred Oster
- Hannes Messemer as General Glücks
- Garfield Morgan as Israeli General
- Shmuel Rodensky as Simon Wiesenthal
- Ernst Schröder as Werner Deilman
- Günter Strack as Kunik
- Noel Willman as Franz Bayer
- Günter Meisner as General Greifer
- Gunnar Möller as Karl Braun
- Til Kiwe as Medal Shop Proprietor
- Joachim Dietmar Mues as Wehrmacht Captain
- Cyril Shaps as Tauber's Voice (narrating the diary)
- Oskar Werner as an Wehrmacht Officer (uncredited)

== Production ==
Producer John Woolf had just made a successful film from another novel by Forsyth, The Day of the Jackal.

Filming was done on location in Hamburg, Heidelberg, and Munich, West Germany and Salzburg, Austria; at Pinewood Studios, England; and the Bavaria Studios in Grünwald, Bavaria, West Germany. It was filmed with Panavision equipment, produced with Eastmancolor technologies.

The film's title song, "Christmas Dream", written by Andrew Lloyd Webber and Tim Rice, was sung by Perry Como and the London Boy Singers, and heard as diegetic music over a car radio during the main titles of the film.

Simon Wiesenthal served as a technical advisor for the production.

== Reception ==
The film premiered at the 1974 San Francisco International Film Festival. The American Nazi Party staged a protest outside the theater but it was mistaken for a promotion of the film.

The film has an aggregated score of 69% from 16 reviews on Rotten Tomatoes. Nora Sayre of the New York Times said, "The film makes its points methodically, almost academically. It also drags because there are many unnecessary transitional passages, devoted to moving the characters from one situation to another. Almost every occurrence is predictable."

Stanley Kauffmann of The New Republic wrote that The Odessa File was a 'seriously inane thriller' but did praise Jon Voight's German accent.
