= Robert Markowitz =

American film director

- Born: February 7, 1935 (age 90); Irvington, New Jersey, U.S.
- Occupation(s): Film director, television director
- Years active: 1976–2006

Robert Markowitz (born February 7, 1935, in Irvington, New Jersey) is an American film and television director. He directed episodes of Serpico (1976), Delvecchio (1976-1977), and Amazing Stories (1986), and a number of television films that include A Dangerous Life (1988), Too Young to Die? (1990), Decoration Day (1990), Because Mommy Works (1994), Twilight Zone: Rod Serling's Lost Classics (1994) The Tuskegee Airmen (1995), The Great Gatsby (2000), The Big Heist (2001), The Pilot's Wife (2002), and Word of Honor (2003).

His last directing credit was the TNT television film Avenger (2006), starring Sam Elliott and Timothy Hutton.

== Partial filmography ==
- The Storyteller (1977) – Made for TV – ABC
- Too Young to Die? (1990) – Made for TV – NBC
- Decoration Day (1990) – Made for TV – NBC
- The Tuskegee Airmen (1995) – Made for TV – HBO
- David (1997) – Made for TV – TNT
- The Great Gatsby (2000) – Made for TV – A&E Networks/BBC
- The Pilot's Wife (2002) – Made for TV – CBS
- Word of Honor (2003) – Made for TV – TNT
- Avenger (2006) – Made for TV – TNT
