= No Comebacks =

1982 collection of short stories by Frederick Forsyth

- First edition
- Author: Frederick Forsyth
- Language: English
- Genre: Crime short stories
- Publisher: Hutchinson
- Publication date: 1982
- Publication place: United Kingdom
- Media type: Print (hardback & paperback)
- Pages: 256
- ISBN: 0-09-147870-7

No Comebacks is a 1982 collection of ten short stories by English writer Frederick Forsyth. Each story takes place in a different setting and ends with a plot twist. Several of them involve a central male character without any apparent strength who is put under pressure, but who does not give in.

Penthouse magazine reviewed the collection by saying: "Quite possibly the most entertaining collection of short stories currently making the rounds."

== List of stories and plots ==
The stories in the collection are:

- No Comebacks

A wealthy Englishman, who can have anything he wants, finally encounters a woman he wants but cannot have. The desired Spaniard is married to a husband who needs her so long as he's alive. But for a man with money and no scruples, there's an obvious fix for that. He hires a foreign hit-man to travel to Southern Spain and overcome the obstacle with an unforeseen outcome.

- There are no Snakes in Ireland

An Indian student takes a job on a tough Irish wrecking crew for money, and is mistreated by a racist boss. His revenge is so complex that something is bound to go wrong with it.

- The Emperor

An ineffectual tourist named Murgatroyd (instead of Macomber) battles a monster blue marlin, and finds something besides pain.

- There Are Some Days...

A hapless crew of Irish trucking hijackers finds themselves with an odiferous load of rose fertilizer instead of fine brandy. But their troubles have only begun.

- Money with Menaces

A meek senior insurance company officer finds himself being neatly blackmailed regarding the first sexual misadventure of his life. Surely he has no choice but to pay...

- Used in Evidence

A man's fight against eviction from the condemned house where he has lived alone since his wife disappeared 15 years before, becomes more understandable when the mummified cadaver of a woman is found bricked up between the wall and chimney breast of his fireplace. In such an open-and-shut case, why will he not even say a word?

- Privilege

When a businessman finds himself libeled by a careless journalist, it seems there is little he can do about it that will not bankrupt him. If only the law in such matters had any part that was equitable to all.

- Duty

A couple vacationing in France in the 1950s finds a ghost of Irish history.

- A Careful Man

Mr. Timothy Hanson is a self-made man with a terminal cancer. If he hates his sister, his only surviving relative, as much as he hates the death tax, why does his last will specify that the woman and her husband get his entire estate, if only both of them will personally push the lead coffin containing Hanson's body, off a boat into the deep waters of the English Channel?

- Sharp Practice

In the unsophisticated world of 1938, a deck of marked cards used in a game of poker on a train might be just what it seems, or not.

== Other short stories by the same author ==
Forsyth has written another collection of short stories, The Veteran.
