= The Fourth Protocol (film) =

Cold War spy film (1987)

- Theatrical release poster
- Directed by: John Mackenzie
- Screenplay by: Frederick Forsyth
- Based on: The Fourth Protocol by Frederick Forsyth
- Produced by: Timothy Burrill
- Starring: Michael Caine; Pierce Brosnan; Ned Beatty; Ian Richardson; Joanna Cassidy
- Cinematography: Phil Méheux
- Edited by: Graham Walker
- Music by: Lalo Schifrin
- Distributed by: Rank Film Distributors
- Release date: 20 March 1987
- Running time: 119 minutes
- Country: United Kingdom
- Language: English
- Budget: $6 million or £8 million
- Box office: $12,423,831

The Fourth Protocol is a 1987 British Cold War spy film starring Michael Caine and Pierce Brosnan. Directed by John Mackenzie, it is based on the 1984 novel The Fourth Protocol by Frederick Forsyth.

== Plot ==
In 1968, an East-West agreement is established to halt nuclear proliferation. One of its clauses, the Fourth Protocol, forbids the non-conventional delivery of a nuclear weapon to a target.

MI5 agent John Preston breaks into the residence of British government official George Berenson on New Year's Eve and finds a number of top secret NATO files that should not have been there. He reports his discovery to high-ranking British Secret Service official Sir Nigel Irvine, who deals with the leak. Preston's unapproved method of retrieving the documents humiliatites the acting director of MI5, Brian Harcourt-Smith, and as punishment for his insubordination, Preston is relegated to lowly "Airports and Ports".

KGB operative Major Valeri Petrofsky, alias James Edward Ross, is sent on a mission to the United Kingdom by General Govorshin, the head of the KGB. Govorshin's subordinate, Pavel Borisov, complains to his old friend General Yevgeny Karpov, about his department being stripped of resources and personnel, particularly his star officer Petrofsky. A surprised Karpov quietly investigates and learns about Petrofsky's unsanctioned mission – to violate the Fourth Protocol by assembling and detonating an atomic device as a false flag, to appear to be an American nuclear accident at a nearby military base, intended to strain British-US relations and strengthen the anti-nuclear movement in advance of an election as courtesy to the Soviet Union.

In Glasgow, a Soviet sailor is killed by a truck while fleeing from a port guard. Among his possessions, Preston finds a disk of polonium, which could only be useful as a component of a detonator for a bomb. He informs Harcourt-Smith, but is promptly suspended, as Harcourt-Smith believes that Preston is manufacturing a phony incident for getting reinstated into MI5. Fourtatnley, Preston has the confidence of Sir Bernard Hemmings, the gravely-ill Director of MI5, as well as Irvine, who is happy to sidestep Harcourt-Smith's directives. Preston sets to work and eventually comes across Winkler, a familiar Czech KGB agent, and tails him from the airport.

Meanwhile, Petrofsky kills Tom Mcwhiter, an associate of Preston. Petrofsky also meets KGB agent Irina Vassilievna, a bomb expert who is pretending to be his wife. Under her guidance, they assemble the device from the smuggled items and she sets it on a two-hour delay as they agreed to it. Unbeknownst to Petrofsky, Vassilievna follows her own assignment, resetting the delay to zero. After having sex with Petrofsky, she finds his own covert order to eliminate her and tries to warn him about the double-cross, but he kills her before she can.

Afterwards, Petrofsky is observed contacting Winkler. Preston tracks him to Ipswich, loses him, then closes in on him again. Preston eventually understands that Petrofsky's target is [RAF Baywaters], and locates Petrofsky's house, which is right next to the base.

When Petrofsky starts to activate the bomb, on an impulse, he checks the timer first and becomes convinced he has been betrayed. Then, an SAS team storms the house and during a struggle, Preston subdues and disables Petrofsky. Much to Preston's outrage, one of the SAS team cold-bloodedly shoots and kills Petrofsky, explaining bluntly afterwards that he had orders to do so.

At Hemmings's funeral ceremony, Preston is flabbergasted to see Irvine secretly meeting with General Karpov. Preston had become suspicious when Winkler was used as a courier for him to be found, and also when Petrofsky was killed instead of being captured for interrogation. He surmised that discrediting Govorshin would benefit Irvine and Karpov, sneering to both that keeping hold over their careers is all that matters to them. Preston does not see any point in exposing the pair and leaves after expressing his contempt for their cynical power play as Irvine secretly assuring Karpov that they have control over Preston, as they covertly observe him reunite with his young son.

== Cast ==
- Michael Caine as John Preston
- Pierce Brosnan as Major Valeri Alekseyevich Petrofsky / James Edward Ross
- Ned Beatty as General Pavel Petrovich Borisov
- Joanna Cassidy as Irina Vassilievna
- Julian Glover as Brian Harcourt-Smith
- Michael Gough as Sir Bernard Hemmings
- Ray McAnally as General Yevgeny Sergeyevich Karpov
- Ian Richardson as Sir Nigel Irvine
- Anton Rodgers as George Berenson
- Caroline Blakiston as Angela Berenson
- Joseph Brady as Carmichael
- Matt Frewer as Tom McWhirter
- Betsy Brantley as Eileen McWhirter
- Sean Chapman as Captain Lyndhurst
- Alan North as General Govorshin
- Ronald Pickup as Wynne-Evans
- John Horsley as Sir Anthony Plumb
- Michael Bilton as Kim Philby
- Peter Cartwright as Jan Marais
- Aaron Schwartz as Gregoriev
- Mark Rolston as Russian Decoder
- Michael J. Jackson as Major Pavlov
- Matthew Marsh as Barry Banks
- Jerry Harte as Professor Krylov

== Production ==
Michael Caine read the draft manuscript of the novel and suggested to Forsyth that they produce a film together. They hired George Axelrod to write a script and John Frankenheimer to direct, but were unable to raise finance. Axelrod and Frankenheimer left the project, Forsyth wrote the script himself and they got a new producer and director.

Even though the book sold over seven million copies Forsyth spent an estimated 18 months raising the finance. "Freddie had a lot of difficulty raising the finance for this film, particularly from the Americans, because I think they are running scared of terrorist movies," said Caine.

Eventually half the money came from private sources, half from corporations, with 70% from Britain and 30% mostly from the US. Half the budget was from a private investor, an admirer of Forsyth. The author and Caine invested their fees which came to an estimated £1 million.

Filming took place in June 1986 over eleven weeks. "What I want to do is make a film of my story, [and] not a film of my book," said Forsyth.

== Locations ==
Much of the film was shot in the Heelands district of Milton Keynes; the main house featured is on Tranlands Brigg, Heelands, Milton Keynes. Scenes set on the London Underground were shot at Charing Cross, Green Park, and Aldwych stations. Colchester Station was also used in one scene, with star Michael Caine filmed standing on the tracks. For some of the interiors, rooms of King's College London on the Strand were used. The "RAF Baywaters" scenes were filmed at the now defunct RAF Upper Heyford as a take on the real life RAF Bentwaters. Filming also took place in Finland. Towards the end of the film, the car chase in Ipswich is actually shot in Chelmsford on the A1016 Chelmer Valley bypass which at the time was newly built. One shot shows helicopters flying under the Orwell Bridge which is often considered a local landmark. Heybridge Basin along the sea wall is used as well. The scene shows a café which is now a private residence.

Eastbourne Mews, W2, was used as the filming location for John Preston's (Michael Caine) house.

== Differences from the novel ==
- The film opens with the killing of Kim Philby, who has already planned the operation, because he knows too much. In the book, he remains a key figure.
- The film begins with Preston breaking into Berenson's house to expose him as a traitor. In the novel, Jim Rawlings, a professional thief, robs Berenson's flat of jewellery. In the process, he discovers illegal copies of classified documents in a briefcase. As a patriotic citizen, he takes them and sends them anonymously to MI5. The character of Rawlings is omitted from the film and the side plot of the disposal of the stolen jewellery is not pursued. In the film, the jewellery is taken by Preston, and returned to Berenson by Irvine. In the novel, the jewellery is broken down by Rawlings's fence and later taken from the diamond polisher working for the fence after he is tortured and killed. Berenson's contacts have a replica made of the jewellery using zirconium stones and later permanently deposits them with his bank.
- The political plot of the book to enable the Labour Party to win the general election and allow for a communist takeover of the party was left out.
- The film removes a large section of the book in regard to Preston's investigation into Jan Marais in South Africa.
- The character of the assembler in the book is a man, although the surname is the same. He is killed by getting his neck broken in a forest rather than being shot in bed.
- In the novel, the Soviet sailor is attacked by street thugs and later commits suicide by jumping from the top floor of a hospital, while in the movie he is hit by a truck.
- In the book, the story about Berenson is linked to the atomic plot because it provides a way for Irvine to send a false message to Karpov suggesting the operation is blown. Karpov, fearful of a scandal then sends Winkler, his worst agent, to help Preston find Petrofsky, hoping that in exchange Irvine will ensure any scandal will be suppressed. The theme is of backchannels between individuals in opposing intelligence services working to counter dangerous opportunism within their governments. The end of the film implies Irvine and Karpov have a much more cynical collaboration simply to help their careers.
- Sir Nigel Irvine is a much more positively-presented character in the book, where he supports Preston because he genuinely respects his abilities, has Petrofsky killed to undercut the KGB without going to war (in the book, Preston accepts this with mild disappointment instead of the anger he shows in the film), and arranges for Preston to get lucrative private-sector work so he can win sole custody of his young son.
- Brian Harcourt-Smith is arrogant in both the film and book, but the film ignores him in its last third. In the book, his mishandling of the situation with Petrofsky leads the senior MI5 leaders to stop his appointment as Director-General, and he angrily resigns to take a job at a bank.

== Reception ==
=== Box office ===
The film debuted at no. 4 at the box office with $3.6 million in ticket sales.

In the UK it made £766,413.

=== Critical response ===
Rotten Tomatoes retrospectively gave the film a score of 67% based on reviews from 21 critics.

The Globe and Mail's film critic Jay Scott said that "the movie is entertaining on a rudimentary, never-to-be-taken-seriously level. On the rare occasions when it does rise above the material, it's because Pierce Brosnan is chillingly effective as an assassin with the body temperature of a snake. The yarn is otherwise little more than Mission Impossible tightly re-wound for the age of glasnost." Scott praised Michael Caine's excellent performance, but complained that the "role permits him to display only one of the three dimensions he was able to provide in his portrayal of the father in The Whistle Blower (1986)."

Halliwell's Film and Video Guide described it as a "very competent but somehow old hat espionage thriller", awarding it one star from a possible four. Quoted in Halliwell's guide, Daily Variety stated that "there is an uneasy feeling that the whole affair could have been better made into an excellent miniseries". John Ferguson awarded it two stars out of five for Radio Times, stating "what once made for diverting summer reading now appears tired and not particularly relevant".

== Trivia ==
Michael Caine and Ray McAnally would appear together the following year in the Thames Television and CBS television miniseries Jack the Ripper.
