= Icon (film) =

2005 television film based on the novel by Frederick Forsyth

- Written by: Frederick Forsyth; Adam Armus; Nora Kay Foster
- Directed by: Charles Martin Smith
- Starring: Patrick Swayze; Patrick Bergin; Michael York; Annika Peterson; Ben Cross; Jeff Fahey
- Theme music composer: Mark Kilian; Daniel Licht
- Country of origin: United States
- Original language: English

Production
- Producers: Brian Gordon; Robert Halmi Jr. Larry Levinson; Nick Lombardo; Michael Moran
- Cinematography: David Connell
- Editor: Craig Bassett
- Running time: 173 minutes

Original release
- Network: Hallmark Channel
- Release: May 30, 2005

Icon (or Frederick Forsyth's Icon) is a 2005 made-for-television thriller film directed by Charles Martin Smith and very loosely based on the 1997 novel by Frederick Forsyth. The film premiered on Hallmark Channel May 30, 2005. It is set in the period 1985 to 1999.

== Plot ==
During the 1999 Russian Presidential elections, the two leading candidates are Igor Komarov (Patrick Bergin), a former Colonel of the KGB, and Nikolai Nikolayev (Joss Ackland), a retired General of the Russian Army. When a car bomb explodes outside one of Komarov's pharmaceutical companies, and a virus is stolen from inside, an investigation by the FSB ensues headed by FSB agents Sonia Astrova (Annika Peterson) and Andrei Kasanov (Niko Nicotera). Their investigation is obstructed by the Director of the FSB, Anatoly Grishin (Ben Cross).

A British Embassy worker from Moscow, Sir Nigel Irvine (Michael York), tracks down Jason Monk (Patrick Swayze), a former CIA operative, who ran double agents in the Soviet Union and convinces him to investigate the incident. Once in Moscow, Jason finds an old friend, Viktor Akopov (Steve Speirs), who agrees to hide Jason from Komarov's men. Viktor steals a residue sample of the bomb used and his scientist friend Tonkin (Valentin Ganev) tells him that the explosive used, Semtex H, has a direct traceable link to the FSB. Tonkin is soon killed by Vladimir Dorganosov (Tom Wlaschiha), the man who attacked Komarov Industries and stole the bioweapon.

Sonia and Andrei locate Leonid Zaitzev (Theodor Danetti), a cleaner who worked at the Komarov Industries plant and saw Dorganosov steal the virus. As they question him, Grishin appears, arrests Zaitzev, and fires Sonia and Andrei. Zaitzev is later killed by Dorganosov while in custody. Sonia goes home to find Jason waiting for her and agrees to help him access the FSB network. However, they are shot at by Dorganosov and a car chase ensues. They go to Andrei's house where they find him already dead.

After the chase, Dorganosov demands the rest of his payment from his contractor, who is revealed to be Anatoly Grishin. While they are arguing, Komarov arrives and orders Grishin to kill Dorganosov.

Jason and Sonia come to realise that Grishin knew about the bombing in advance, and they raid his house for information. Jason is injured and, while he is unconscious, Sonia locates his daughter Elena (Marta Kondova) and brings her to him. While trawling through the information from Grishin's computer, they find a secret manifesto written by Komarov, which tells of his plans to unleash genocide on any "undesirables" in Russia. Jason realises that the bombing and the theft of the bioweapon were planned by Komarov, and mark the beginning of the genocide.

Jason and Sonia go to Komarov's Presidential opponent, General Nikolayev, and try to expose Komarov but he announces having vaccinations for all viruses. This boosts his popularity and leads to his election.

Jason and Sonia find Komarov's facility outside Moscow and raid it. Sonia kills Grishin and takes his phone, which allows them to locate the FSB agents spreading the viruses. After Jason secretly hands Grishin's phone to Sir Nigel, he orders the arrest of the rogue FSB agents. Komarov's plan is revealed publicly, and riots ensue in the streets, calling for his resignation. Komarov attempts to mobilize the army against the rioting crowds, but Nikolayev, at Jason and Sonia's urging, convinces the troops to stand down. Komarov tries to escape but is cornered and shot by Jason and subsequently killed by the crowds.

Nikolayev becomes the acting President, and Sonia is appointed head of the FSB. Jason moves back to Spain with Elena and resumes his job hiring out a fishing boat.

== Cast ==
- Patrick Swayze as Jason Monk
- Patrick Bergin as Igor Komarov
- Michael York as Sir Nigel Irvine
- Annika Peterson as Sonia Astrova
- Ben Cross as Anatoly Grishin
- Jeff Fahey as Harvey Blackledge
- Joss Ackland as General Nikolai Nikolayev
- Steve Speirs as Viktor Akopov
- Niko Nicotera as Andrei Kasanov
- Valentin Ganev as Vladimir Tonkin
- Barry Morse as Josef Cherkassov
- Tom Wlaschiha as Vladimir Dorganosov
- Jay Benedict as Carey Jordan
- Theodor Danetti as Leonid Zaitsev
- Marta Kondova as Elena
- Atanas Srebrev as Misha
- Ross McCall as John Cromwell
- Charles Martin Smith as Doctor

== Reception ==
Robert Pardi of TV Guide gave the film 2/5 stars and remarked that screenwriters Adam Armus and Kay Foster butchered the best-selling source material.
