= Frederick Forsyth Presents =

- Genre: Espionage drama
- Created by: Frederick Forsyth
- Written by: Murray Smith
- Directed by: Tom Clegg; Lawrence Gordon Clark; Ian Sharp; James Cellan Jones
- Starring: Alan Howard
- Music by: Paul Chihara
- Country of origin: United Kingdom
- Original language: English
- No. of episodes: 6

Production
- Executive producers: Nick Elliott; Frederick Forsyth; Murray Smith
- Producer: Frederick Muller
- Production locations: Middle East, North Africa, Europe, West Indies
- Running time: 98 – 103 minutes
- Production company: LWT Productions in association with IFS Productions Ltd.

Original release
- Network: ITV
- Release: 2 December 1989 – 8 December 1990

Related
- The Deceiver (1991), a related book which followed production

Frederick Forsyth Presents is a series of British made-for-television films made by FremantleMedia for LWT on ITV, first broadcast between 2 December 1989 and 8 December 1990.

Based on stories which were later published as the Forsyth novel The Deceiver, there are six films, most with the themes of espionage and war. The character Sam McCready appears in all six films, he is played by Alan Howard. The character is Secret Intelligence Service agent who has become an author but continues to work on SIS operations. He plays the lead in most of the films, but in A Little Piece of Sunshine he was in a supporting role. Each of the stories are introduced on screen by Frederick Forsyth.

== Outline ==
Sam McCready is an experienced SIS field agent who believes in his way of doing things, which is no longer welcome in some quarters. Set in areas of international tension around the world, including the Middle East, Berlin, and the West Indies, the films highlight a division in British espionage and government between those who favour a subservient British relationship with the American Central Intelligence Agency and those, including McCready, who want to see more independence of thought and action. There is also a tension between the protagonists of Signals intelligence, or Sigint, intelligence from electronic interception and satellite observation, and Human intelligence, or Humint, intelligence from agents in the field. The series mocks the subservient camp and those who are over-awed by technology, as well as more gently finding fault with the CIA.

== Production ==
In 1988 Frederick Forsyth secured a contract with London Weekend Television for six thrillers under the headline name of Frederick Forsyth Presents, with a book to be linked to the series, which came out in 1991 as The Deceiver.

The first three episodes were filmed, and the launch of the series was fixed for December 1989. In the run-up to that, the producers said they were hoping to attract eight million television viewers.

== Episodes ==
No.	Title	Directed by	Written by	Original release date
1	A Casualty of War	Tom Clegg	Murray Smith	2 December 1989
Libya is preparing to ship arms to the Provisional IRA, and McCready sends Tom Rowse, a former SAS officer who is now a novelist, to Libya under the cover of researching a book. Rowse makes contact with the Libyan arms dealer and adds an order to the shipment. The SIS can then identify the cargo ship, and McCready enlists the help of the Special Boat Service to intercept it. Monica, a woman Rowse is strongly attracted to, proves to be mixed up with the gun-runners and is shot dead when the ship is boarded. Cast: Alan Howard as Sam McCready, David Threlfall as Tom Rowse, Amanda Burton as Nicola, Shelley Hack as Monica Browne, Clarke Peters as Grover T. Fleming, Tony Lo Bianco as Carlos the Jackal, Pamela Villoresi as Antonella, Gottfried John as Rodimstev.
2	Just Another Secret	Lawrence Gordon Clark	Murray Smith	9 December 1989
An American intelligence agent investigates the sudden disappearance of a colleague who was stationed in East Berlin. He finds a conspiracy to murder a Soviet politician. Cast: Beau Bridges as Jack Grant, Alan Howard as Sam McCready, Kenneth Cranham as Brosch, James Faulkner as Markus Vogel, Erich Hallhuber as Dieter Oberg, Enn Reitel as Dietrich, Michael Ensign as Chuck Lupus, Beatie Edney as Anneliese, Thomas Wheatley as Malcolm Turner, Donald Arthur as Stevens, Richard Kane as Zaitsev, David Howey as Schnabel, Timothy Kightley as Rudi Junsche, Carolyn Choa as Anthea, Bernd Stephan as Dr Ziegler.
3	Pride and Extreme Prejudice	Ian Sharp	Murray Smith	16 December 1989
A Soviet general offers the SIS important military documents, and a meeting is set up in East Germany, with McCready in charge of the operation. As the Soviets know him, he recruits his old friend Bruno Morenz, a BND agent, who has to break BND rules to enter East Germany, which he does as a favour to McCready. Morenz secures the documents, but his life is in chaos, as he has just accidentally killed a woman and her pimp boyfriend and is on the run from the police. McCready finds Morenz a hiding place and enters East Germany to join him. With the Stasi closing in on them, and Morenz unable to escape, McCready kills him with poison, takes the documents, and escapes to the West. Cast: Brian Dennehy as Bruno Morenz, Alan Howard as Sam McCready, Simon Cadell as Wilson, Lisa Eichhorn as Claudia, Leonie Mellinger as Renate, Michael Shannon as Chapinski, Malcolm Storry as Pankratin, Patrick Pearson as Aust, Tony Doyle as Hoffman, Eamon Boland as Inspector Kleist, Guy Deghy as Glavatski, Anne Dyson as Ingrid, Niven Boyd as Scott, Sabina Trooger as Irenya, Sebastian Baur as Ustinov.
4	A Little Piece of Sunshine	James Cellan Jones	Murray Smith	17 November 1990
Sunshine, an island in the British West Indies, is about to become independent, but shortly before the handover, in the middle of a bitterly fought presidential election campaign, the British governor is shot dead. Sam McCready of SIS sends in Desmond Hannah of Scotland Yard, but he can only go there unofficially. The governor's widow, Lady Beatrix Coltrane tells Hannah that most of the inhabitants are not looking forward to independence, trusting neither of the two presidential candidates and fearing for their future. One candidate, Tomson is said to have drug-running connections, while the other, Livingstone, has links with Cuba. Drake, the island's priest, is also against independence. Ernie Favaro, a police detective from Miami, arrives to investigate a murder ordered by the Medellín Cartel. Hannah and Favaro work together but are not welcomed by the island's chief constable. Someone shoots at them, and they catch him and find it is Drake, who wanted to create a sensation, not to hit them. The local police then arrest Hannah and Favaro for illegal possession of firearms. McCready arrives, deus ex machina, as the acting Governor of Sunshine Island and takes charge of the case. Lady Coltrane hints that she killed her husband herself. Favaro calls on Tomson and in his house sees a rare copy of Paradise Lost which leads back to the Medellín. McCready visits Tomson with Favaro, who steals the book, and inside it is a microfilm with the names and details of Medellín Cartel deals. Tomson tries to escape, and is shot. The presidential election is postponed until further notice, and McCready remains on the island as Governor. Cast: Larry Lamb as Desmond Hannah, Chris Cooper as Ernie Favaro, Philip Michael Thomas as Tomson, Kitty Aldridge as Sabrina, Lauren Bacall as Beatrix Coltrane, Alan Howard as Sam McCready, Clarence Thomas as Father Drake, Robert MacBeth as Livingstone, W. Paul Bodie as Bill Jones, Nelson Oramas as Carlos Garcia, Luis Alday as Hernandez.
5	Death Has a Bad Reputation	Lawrence Gordon Clark	Murray Smith	24 November 1990
The French government expels dozens of Soviet diplomats, and Rodimstev, head of the KGB, forms an alliance with Carlos the Jackal to punish France. Sam McCready works to hinder them, going outside the law and the rules of his department. He has his own grudge match with Carlos, as his son Nick McCready was disabled in a terrorist attack. Cast: Tony Lo Bianco as Carlos, Pamela Villoresi as Antonella, Elizabeth Hurley as Julia Latham, Gottfried John as Rodimstev, Alan Howard as Sam McCready, Venantino Venantini as Umberto Aidoni, David Lyon as Patrick Cowlishaw, Richard Hope as Spry, Garrick Hagon as Stephen T. Hamilton, Philip Lowrie as Superintendent Jamieson, Pier Luigi Misasi as Luca Chiesa, Sabina Trooger as Irenya, Udo Vioff as Andropov, Guy Scantlebury as Nick McCready.
6	The Price of the Bride	Tom Clegg	Murray Smith	8 December 1990
While on a Soviet Military Intelligence visit to Britain, a Russian contacts the CIA station in London, wishing to defect to the US, claiming to be Colonel Pyotr Orlov of the KGB. Orlov's information leads to the arrest of several Soviet spies around the world and also gives insights into the Soviets' military planning. But McCready senses that something is wrong, and the head of the KGB's London office, who works for McCready under the name of Keepsake, claims that Orlov is not a defector at all, but a KGB plant, the purpose being to falsely discredit a high-ranking CIA officer as a Soviet mole. The American and British sides refuse to believe each other's versions of events, and "Orlov" succeeds in bringing down the supposed CIA traitor. Keepsake then suddenly returns to Moscow, casting doubt on McCready's warnings. Aiming to prevent the disintegration of the CIA, McCready brings Keepsake back from Moscow, and Keepsake says he went there to get solid proof that the Orlov defection is a deception. However, a CIA agent then kills the man Orlov identified as a mole, and when Orlov is exposed, he accepts execution. Cast: Mike Farrell as Joe Roth, Peter Egan as Dennis Gaunt, Robert Foxworth as Colonel Orlov, Diana Quick as Alice Daltrey, Alan Howard as Sam McCready, David Healy as Calvin Bailey, Bruno Dietrich as Gorodov, Don Fellows as Douglas, Ron Berglas as Carter, Colin Bruce as Frank Bell, Michael Eaves as Pelling, Clyde Gatell as Nelson, Gay Baynes as Mildred, Heather James as Sarah Campbell, Sarah Rhoades as Emily Bailey.

== See also ==
- 1989 in British television
