= The Deceiver (novel) =

Novel by Frederick Forsyth

- First edition (UK)
- Author: Frederick Forsyth
- Language: English
- Genre: Spy
- Publisher: Bantam Press
- Publication date: 1991
- Publication place: United Kingdom
- Media type: Print (hardback and paperback)
- Pages: 416
- ISBN: 0-593-02346-3
- OCLC: 59972987

The Deceiver is a novel by English writer Frederick Forsyth, about a retiring agent of the British SIS named Sam McCready. He is the head of Deception, Disinformation and Psychological Operations, and his maverick but brilliant successes have led to his nickname "The Deceiver." The stories had previously been filmed as Frederick Forsyth Presents, a miniseries for British television, in 1989 and 1990, with McCready played by Alan Howard. The outlines were conceived by Forsyth, with the majority of the scenarios and scripts done first by screenwriter Murray Smith for filming. He and Forsyth split the profits on the television series. The book followed in 1991 with Forsyth doing the majority of the work, with profits split under the same arrangement. It appeared in The New York Times's list of the best-selling books for eight weeks, and its peak was #6.

== Plot ==
=== Prologue ===
It is discreetly explained to the Chief of British Intelligence that, in the new atmosphere of détente, and the warming of relations with the Soviet Union, that the SIS's role will have to be redefined, and some of its more aggressive agents will have to be taught a lesson. The Chief is ordered to make an example of a maverick officer, and Sam McCready is suggested.

McCready's deputy is unwilling to let his mentor retire without a fight, and insists on a hearing, during which four of McCready's most celebrated cases are recalled.

=== Pride and Extreme Prejudice ===
The SIS is approached by a high-ranking Soviet general, offering to turn over documents with crucial details of Soviet military plans. The meeting is to take place in East Germany. McCready is in charge of the operation, but he is too well known by the Soviets to risk going himself. So, he recruits his old ally, ageing BND agent Bruno Morenz. As a favour to his old friend, and in stark violation of his BND employment rules, Morenz agrees to enter East Germany, where he manages to get hold of the documents.

However, Morenz is on the verge of nervous collapse due to earlier events in West Germany, where he had been having an affair with a prostitute who later insulted him, which led to him killing her and her pimp boyfriend. He also steals some covert tapes she had made of herself in compromising positions with influential people. In making his escape he becomes rashly involved in a minor traffic accident. A man-hunt ensues, with the result that the East German security services eventually realise that they have a substantial spy case on their hands. McCready comes to realise that Morenz is in deep trouble and digging into his past, locates a potential hiding place. Against all orders he assumes a false identity, and making use of old friends succeeds in crossing the border and locating Morenz without being noticed. Since the security search is closing in on them, and Morenz is in no state to make an escape, Sam kills him with poisoned alcohol, and takes the documents and manages to escape by slipping through the border again, thus protecting the general from exposure, saving Morenz from an uglier fate, and succeeding in retrieving the sought-after documents. Sam tries to retrieve the tapes but is found by the East German Stasi who retrieve the holdall and escorts him onto the plane unaware of the more important cargo he carries.

=== The Price of the Bride ===
During a visit by the Soviet Military Intelligence Corps (GRU) to Britain, a Corps member phones the Central Intelligence Agency's London outpost, and defects to the US, introducing himself as KGB Colonel Pyotr Orlov.

Orlov's information proves to be highly valuable, leading to the arrest of Soviet spies in many countries, and providing important information on Soviet military planning. While the CIA is delighted to have such a valuable asset, Sam McCready has a gut feeling that something might be wrong with Orlov; his suspicion is confirmed by the head of the KGB's London residency, who secretly works for McCready (Codename Keepsake). Keepsake claims that Orlov is not a defector, but a plant, tasked with denouncing the CIA's Deputy Director (Operations), Calvin Bailey, as a Soviet mole in an attempt to bring chaos and distrust to the entire agency.

At this point, the co-operation between the US and the British turns into mutual distrust, with both sides vouching for their own sources. Events accelerate when Orlov finally succeeds, indirectly, in identifying the supposed CIA traitor, followed by Keepsake suddenly departing for Moscow, making it look as if Sam is wrong.

To prevent the disintegration of the CIA from within, and to prove to himself that Keepsake did not deceive him, McCready prepares to help him escape from Moscow. Keepsake reveals that he returned to Moscow to bring back incontestable proof of both his own loyalty to Sam, and of Orlov's treachery.

Keepsake's information arrives too late, however; an over-eager CIA agent has already killed Bailey on the Director's orders. Confronted with Sam's information, the agent resigns from the agency, but not before arresting Orlov, who stoically accepts his immediate execution.

=== A Casualty of War ===
The SIS uncovers evidence that Libya is preparing to ship a consignment of arms for the use of the Provisional Irish Republican Army (IRA) and other European terrorist groups.

Sam McCready recruits an ex-SAS soldier-turned-novelist named Tom Rowse, to pose as a weapons' buyer, thinly veiled by his pretending to be undertaking research for a new novel. He manages to get in touch with the Libyan arms provider, and get his order included in the shipment.

With this information, the British are able to identify the ship transporting the weapons. McCready enlists the help of the elite Special Boat Service (SBS), seaborne equivalent of the SAS, to intercept the vessel. A woman, in whom Tom was romantically interested, is found to be directly involved with the IRA terrorists, and is shot dead when the vessel is boarded.

=== A Little Bit of Sunshine ===
The Barclays is a small (fictional) British overseas territory in the Caribbean, in transition from British rule to independence. The island is about to hold its first election for Prime Minister, and, since no political parties have yet developed the two leading candidates are both expatriates, with no financial backing or popular support from the population.

When a visiting Florida law enforcement officer, who is on vacation, recognises a notorious hired killer amongst the candidates' campaign workers, he boards a plane in a hurry to fly back to Miami, but when it explodes in mid-air to kill all the passengers, his partner flies to the main Barclayan island, Sunshine, to investigate. When the British territorial governor is also murdered, McCready, who is in the US, gets himself sent to investigate.

There are two Scotland Yard investigators on the island but it is McCready who exposes the two presidential candidates as a Bahamian cocaine smuggler and an agent of the Cuban secret service, respectively, both of whom are seeking to exploit the island for their own ends. It takes some quick thinking on McCready's part to apprehend the criminals, and forge a document to appoint himself Governor for a day – but he is able to foil both candidates' schemes, and ensures that the Barclayan transition to independence will be smooth.

The Florida law enforcement officer agent finally succeeds in catching his partner's killer in the smuggler's house, but Scotland Yard are unable to arrest the person who killed the governor. McCready figures out that the murder was committed by an elderly expatriate American lady, with the purpose of attracting the authorities and the press to the island to deal with the candidates' criminal campaign workers. Given her age, and popularity with the island's people, McCready decides to keep her crime a secret. Without the murder weapon or witnesses, Scotland Yard is unable to arrest her either.

=== Epilogue ===
The SIS hierarchy reject Sam's case, having decided weeks earlier that, since the Cold War was over, his office was no longer necessary. He is offered a variety of desk jobs which he declines in favour of early retirement, deciding that he's done his part. Before he leaves he warns his deputy to keep his eyes peeled, because, despite what the bureaucrats think, the world is still a dangerous place that will always need spies.

As he leaves the building, he passes a newspaper stand where the headlines declare the official end of the Cold War. Four weeks later, whilst fishing outside his retirement cottage, he hears over the radio that Saddam Hussein has invaded Kuwait. Upon hearing this news, vindicated and unmoved, he decides it's "time to change his bait".

== Television adaptations ==
The four stories were filmed as a part of a miniseries for British television in 1989 and 1990, together with two additional stories (Just Another Secret and Death Has a Bad Reputation) that were not part of the novel. McCready was played by British actor Alan Howard.

== Common themes ==
Similar to John le Carré, Forsyth's novels often depict a schism within the British espionage community (and within the British government as a whole), between those officers who favour a conciliatory, subservient relationship with the better resourced American C.I.A., and those who favour a more independent approach. Sam McCready definitely falls into the latter camp. Much like MI-5's Brian Harcourt-Smith in The Fourth Protocol, the S.I.S. bureaucrat who wants a very effective but older operative like McCready sent out to pasture for biased, stupid reasons plans to make himself important and accomplish great things when he becomes the leader; and just as Harcourt-Smith's subpar performance leads to him being passed over as leader, it is revealed that the S.I.S. hotshot will not get his prized position ever, when an experienced S.I.S. official who supports McCready makes it clear he won't support him because he doesn't approve of the selfish reasons presented for retiring McCready.

A corollary of this division is the debate between the usefulness of sigint (signals intelligence, the gathering of information through electronic interception) versus humint (human intelligence, gathering information through recruiting agents). In several of his novels, Forsyth ridicules the C.I.A. and the "subservient" camp of the British S.I.S. as being over-awed by technology, such as sigint and satellite photography, and regarding spying through human agents as a thing of the past. Whereas experienced field agents like McCready know that these approaches can be avoided or fooled, and it takes a human agent to gather reliable intelligence.

In Forsyth's subsequent novel, The Fist of God, taking place during the Persian Gulf War, the Americans and British become suddenly (even comically) aware of the inadequacy of these approaches in giving them real insight into Saddam Hussein's true intentions, and begin searching desperately for a way to infiltrate the Iraqi regime with a living agent. In an afterword, Forsyth makes his point explicit, that humint is still a necessary part of espionage.
