= The Biafra Story =

Non-fiction book on the Biafran War

- Cover of first edition published by Penguin Books
- Author: Frederick Forsyth
- Language: English
- Genre: Non-fiction
- Publisher: Penguin Books
- Publication date: 1969
- Pages: 286 (1977 edition)

The Biafra Story is a 1969 non-fiction book by Frederick Forsyth about the Nigerian Civil War (1967–70) in which Biafra unsuccessfully attempted to secede from Nigeria. Reportedly one of the earliest eyewitness accounts of the war from the Biafran perspective, a revised edition was published after the war in 1977.

== Publication ==
The Biafra Story was written by journalist and author Frederick Forsyth, who claims in his book that he had originally been working as a correspondent for the BBC Africa Service in Enugu but quit and left for Biafra after becoming "so disgusted" with the BBC's "lies and distortions". Reportedly one of the earliest eyewitness accounts of the war, the first edition of The Biafra Story was published in 1969 amid the Nigerian Civil War (1967–1970) and seven months before the secessionist army of Biafra surrendered. In the final few weeks of the war, Forsyth returned to Biafra and substantially expanded his original manuscript. The revised edition of the book was published in 1977 under the title The Making of an African Legend: The Biafra Story, and includes in its prologue and epilogue a history of post-Civil War Nigeria up to the year of publication.

== Reception ==
In a review for The Spectator, Auberon Waugh praised the first edition of The Biafra Story as "probably the best we shall see on the war" and "by far the most complete account", while offering that its "greatest single weakness" was its presupposing "concern and a readiness for moral judgment", neither of which were justified in Waugh's view. Peter Mustell, in a review of the revised edition for The Journal of Modern African Studies, criticised the author's lack of impartiality in that he was "too complimentary to the Biafran leader". Mustell also noted several factual errors present in both editions, while echoing Forsyth's own disclaimer that the book was "not a detached account" of the war and should be "examined with a careful curiosity".
