= Emeka (book) =

1982 book by Frederick Forsyth

- cover of the 1991 revised paperback edition
- Author: Frederick Forsyth
- Language: English
- Genre: Biography Non-fiction
- Publisher: Spectrum Books
- Publication date: 1982
- Publication place: United Kingdom
- Media type: Print (Hardback & Paperback)

Emeka a biography by English writer Frederick Forsyth about his friend Colonel Chukwuemeka Odumegwu Ojukwu, head of the state of Biafra, a republic that seceded from Nigeria and was briefly independent. The book was published in 1982. In 1991 a revised edition was published.

"Emeka" is an abbreviation of the Igbo name "Chukwuemeka".
