= Avenger (film) =

2006 television film by Robert Markowitz

- Promotional poster
- Genre: Thriller
- Based on: Avenger by Frederick Forsyth
- Written by: Alan Sharp
- Directed by: Robert Markowitz
- Starring: Sam Elliott; Timothy Hutton; James Cromwell
- Music by: Stephen Graziano
- Country of origin: United States
- Original language: English

Production
- Executive producers: Wolfgang Petersen; Larry Spiegel; Judy Goldstein
- Producer: Mitch Engel
- Cinematography: Oliver Bokelberg
- Editor: David Beatty
- Running time: 92 minutes
- Production companies: Radiant Productions; Appledown Films Inc.; Warner Bros. Television

Original release
- Network: TNT
- Release: April 9, 2006

Avenger is a 2006 American television thriller film directed by Robert Markowitz and written by Alan Sharp, based on the 2003 novel of the same name by Frederick Forsyth. The film stars Sam Elliott and Timothy Hutton. It aired on TNT on April 9, 2006.

== Premise ==
A CIA agent steps in to stop a former special forces operative on a for-hire mission that poses a global threat.

== Cast ==
- Sam Elliott as Calvin Dexter
- Timothy Hutton as Frank McBride
- James Cromwell as Paul Devereaux
- William Hope as Stephen Edmonds
- David Hayman as Zoran Zilic
- Jamie Bartlett as Van Rensburg
- Lucy Russell as Curtis
- Jacqueline Chan as Madame Huong
- Andre Jacobs as Fleming
- Joe Vaz as Moran
- Antonio David Lyons as Washington Lee
- Morné Visser as Arms dealer
- Russel Savadier as Colonel Barney
- Nicholas Pauling as Emile
- Patrick John Walton as Bosnian man
- Bart Fouche as Jet pilot

== Production ==
Filming took place in Cape Town, South Africa.

== Release ==
The film was broadcast on TNT on April 9, 2006. It was released on DVD by Warner Home Video on October 3, 2006.

== Reception ==
David Cornelius of DVDTalk saying "Its plot is merely an afterthought, a thread on which we hang the coolness that is Sam Elliott".
