= The Odessa File =

1972 novel by Frederick Forsyth

- First edition cover (Hutchinson)
- Author: Frederick Forsyth
- Language: English
- Genre: Thriller, Historical fiction
- Publisher: Hutchinson
- Publication date: 1972
- Publication place: United Kingdom
- English publication date: 1972
- Media type: Print (hardcover & paperback)
- Pages: 310
- ISBN: 0-09-113020-4
- OCLC: 1028455185
- Dewey Decimal: 823/.9/14
- LC Class: PZ4.F7349 1995
- Followed by: Revenge of Odessa

The Odessa File is a 1972 political thriller novel by English author Frederick Forsyth. Set in 1963, the story follows Peter Miller, a West German freelance crime reporter, who obtains the diary of a Holocaust survivor and uncovers a clandestine network protecting former members of the SS. Positioned between Forsyth's debut novel, The Day of the Jackal (1971), and The Dogs of War (1974), it is widely regarded as the second entry in an informal trilogy of investigative political thrillers that popularized the "documentary thriller" technique—blending meticulous journalistic research, real-life historical figures, and fictional protagonists.

The narrative begins shortly after the Assassination of John F. Kennedy in November 1963, when Miller investigates the suicide of Salomon Tauber, a German Jew who survived the Riga Ghetto. Tauber's diary details the atrocities committed by the ghetto's commandant, Eduard Roschmann, known as the "The butcher of Riga". Learning that Roschmann is alive and living unpunished in West Germany under an assumed identity, Miller vows to bring him to justice. His investigation draws the attention of Simon Wiesenthal and a secret Mossad vigilante group, eventually leading Miller to infiltrate ODESSA (Organisation der ehemaligen SS-Angehörigen), an underground organization aiding former Waffen-SS officers.

The Odessa File became an international bestseller and was translated into multiple languages, topping Der Spiegel's bestseller list in Germany for 12 consecutive weeks. Beyond its suspense mechanics, the novel was critically recognized for addressing West Germany's slow pace of Vergangenheitsbewältigung (coming to terms with the past) and the presence of former Nazi personnel in post-war legal and political institutions. The book was adapted into a 1974 feature film starring Jon Voight. Public awareness raised by the novel and film directly contributed to increased international scrutiny of the historical Roschmann, leading to his flight from Argentina to Paraguay, where he died in 1977.

== Plot summary ==
=== Inciting Incident and Investigation ===
In November 1963, shortly after the Assassination of John F. Kennedy, freelance crime reporter Peter Miller follows an ambulance to the Hamburg apartment of Salomon Tauber, a Jewish Holocaust survivor who has committed suicide. A sympathetic police friend gives Miller Tauber's diary, which details atrocities committed at the Riga Ghetto under its commandant, Eduard Roschmann, known as the "the butcher of Riga". The diary notes that Roschmann was recently seen alive and prosperous in West Germany. Tauber also describes Roschmann murdering a decorated German Army captain who attempted to prevent SS atrocities during the ghetto's evacuation. Deeply moved, Miller resolves to locate Roschmann.

Miller approaches West German prosecution authorities but finds them indifferent to chasing former Nazis. His search brings him to Nazi hunter Simon Wiesenthal, who explains the existence of ODESSA (Organisation der ehemaligen SS-Angehörigen), a secret network protecting former Waffen-SS members. Miller's inquiries attract a group of Jewish vigilantes with ties to the Mossad seeking to neutralize former Nazi scientists and officers. Recognizing Miller's potential, the vigilantes recruit him to infiltrate ODESSA.

=== Infiltration of ODESSA ===
After receiving covert training from a repentant former SS officer to pass as a veteran sergeant, Miller contacts a lawyer affiliated with ODESSA. Passing intense scrutiny, he is directed to a master passport forger who supplies fugitive SS personnel with false identities. Miller breaks into the forger's home and steals the secret "ODESSA File"—a registry containing the true names, false identities, and locations of former SS members across West Germany.

However, Miller's cover is compromised, prompting ODESSA leadership to deploy an elite hitman to eliminate him. Miller survives a series of assassination attempts, including a car bomb rigged to his sports car a Jaguar XK150 S that fails to detonate due to the vehicle's stiff suspension.

=== Confrontation and Aftermath ===
Tracking Roschmann to his villa under an alias —where Roschmann serves as head of an industrial firm—Miller holds him at gunpoint. Roschmann attempts to justify his wartime actions on racial grounds, but Miller reveals his true motive: he is not hunting war criminals out of ideological duty, but seeking personal justice for the army captain murdered by Roschmann, who was Miller's father, Erwin.

Before Miller can hand Roschmann over to the authorities, Roschmann's bodyguard disarms and knocks Miller unconscious. The bodyguard attempts to drive Miller's car to summon aid, but the vehicle hits a snowbank, detonating the unexploded car bomb and killing him. Roschmann escapes in the confusion and flees to Argentina. Meanwhile, the hitman pursuing Miller is killed by "Josef", a Mossad agent tailing Miller.

While recovering in a hospital, Miller is informed by Josef that the stolen ODESSA File has been turned over to West German authorities, prompting widespread arrests of former SS personnel. Furthermore, Roschmann's firm—which was secretly manufacturing guidance systems for biological weapons planned by the Egyptian military to destroy Israel—is shut down. Josef returns to Israel with Tauber's diary and visits Yad Vashem, reciting Kaddish for the soul of Salomon Tauber.

== Major characters ==
=== Fictional Protagonists and Antagonists ===
- Peter Miller: A 29-year-old freelance investigative crime reporter based in Hamburg. Driven initially by curiosity after reading Salomon Tauber's diary, his quest to locate Eduard Roschmann becomes deeply personal upon discovering Roschmann's connection to his father's death.
- Salomon Tauber: A German Jewish Holocaust survivor whose suicide in November 1963 sets the plot in motion. His detailed war diary provides evidence of SS atrocities in the Riga Ghetto and identifies Roschmann.
- Mackensen (alias "Keller"): An elite ODESSA executioner dispatched by the Werwolf to track down and liquidate Miller.
- The Werwolf: The code name for a prominent West German lawyer who acts as the chief executive officer of ODESSA inside West Germany.
- "Josef" (Major Uri Ben-Shaul): An Israeli Army paratrooper officer assigned by Israeli Intelligence (Mossad) to monitor Miller's investigation.
- Alfred Oster: A former Waffen-SS Captain (Hauptsturmführer) living under an assumed name near Bayreuth who, repenting his wartime actions, trains Miller to pass an ODESSA background check.

=== Historical Figures Dramatized in the Novel ===
- Eduard Roschmann: The primary antagonist. Historically the commandant of the Riga Ghetto, known as the "Butcher of Riga". In the novel, he lives under an assumed identity in West Germany, running an industrial firm (codenamed "Vulkan") secretly manufacturing missile guidance components for Egypt.
- Simon Wiesenthal: The famed Austrian Nazi hunter. Miller visits him at his Documentation Center in Vienna to obtain intelligence on ODESSA's network.
- Richard Glücks: Historically the head of the SS Main Economic and Administrative Office. In the novel's fictional premise, Glücks survived the war and serves as the second-in-command of the global ODESSA network under Martin Bormann.

== Themes and style ==
=== The "Documentary Thriller" Technique ===
Following his debut novel, The Day of the Jackal (1971), Forsyth reinforced the "documentary thriller" format in The Odessa File. Synthesizing his background as a Reuters and BBC investigative journalist, Forsyth builds suspense by embedding fictional characters within real historical contexts and using authentic documentary formatting.

The narrative heavily utilizes technical and logistical realism, such as detailing the mechanics of post-war identity forgery, weapon specifications, automotive engineering (such as the rigid suspension of the Jaguar XK150), and real-world intelligence tradecraft. By interweaving verifiable historical facts—such as actual SS unit rosters, geographic locations, and living war criminals—with a fictional plot arc, Forsyth creates a heightened sense of verisimilitude that blurs the boundary between news reporting and fiction.

=== Vergangenheitsbewältigung and Post-War German Society ===
A central thematic pillar of The Odessa File is Vergangenheitsbewältigung—the socio-cultural struggle of post-WWII Germany to reconcile and come to terms with the Holocaust and Nazi atrocities. Set in 1963, a turning point marked by the Frankfurt Auschwitz Trials, the novel highlights the collective apathy and institutional resistance within 1960s West German society regarding the prosecution of war criminals.

Forsyth depicts a post-war economic miracle (Wirtschaftswunder) where former SS personnel seamlessly integrated into influential positions within the legal system, civil service, and corporate leadership. Miller's isolation during his investigation underscores the systemic reluctance of post-war authorities to reopen wartime wounds, contrasting the moral duty of remembering victims against pragmatic economic and political convenience.

== Historical context and accuracy ==
=== ODESSA vs. Post-War Escape Networks ("Ratlines") ===
While The Odessa File popularized the concept of ODESSA (Organisation der ehemaligen SS-Angehörigen) as an all-powerful, highly centralized international underground network, modern historical consensus regards this depiction as largely fictionalized. Historians such as Guy Walters and Gerald Steinacher note that while informal escape routes—commonly termed "ratlines"—existed to assist fleeing Waffen-SS officers and Nazi war criminals in reaching Latin America or the Middle East, there was no single, tightly organized global syndicate controlling these efforts under the name ODESSA.

Forsyth accurately incorporated real-world logistical details of post-war escape pipelines into the novel's narrative. These included the creation of forged identity documentation, safe-house transit routes through Austria and Italy, and assistance provided by sympathetic figures within institutions like the Catholic Church (such as Bishop Alois Hudal). However, the novel's central plot premised on ODESSA operating as a structured "state within a state" running covert industrial operations and funding Egyptian weapons programs represents a dramatic amplification of historical reality.

=== Real-Life Historical Figures and Real-World Impact ===
Several key figures portrayed in the novel were drawn directly from contemporary history:

- Eduard Roschmann: The primary historical antagonist, Roschmann was indeed the commander of the Riga Ghetto and responsible for thousands of deaths. After the war, Roschmann escaped via Austria and Italy to Argentina using false identity papers under the alias "Fritz Wegener". Unlike the novel's fictional premise, Roschmann did not return to West Germany to run a covert technology firm, but remained in South America.
- Simon Wiesenthal: The Austrian Nazi hunter appears as a character in the novel, providing Peter Miller with background intelligence on Roschmann and ODESSA. Forsyth consulted with Wiesenthal while researching the novel, incorporating authentic investigative details regarding post-war Nazi hunting.
- Richard Glücks: Historically the head of the SS Main Economic and Administrative Office, Glücks committed suicide in May 1945. Forsyth exercises creative license by depicting Glücks as having faked his death to direct ODESSA's global network from South America.

The publication of The Odessa File in 1972 and the release of its 1974 film adaptation generated significant international media attention surrounding Eduard Roschmann. Following heightened public scrutiny and diplomatic pressure from West Germany, Argentine authorities initiated steps toward Roschmann's arrest and extradition. Roschmann fled Argentina for Asunción, Paraguay, where he died of a heart attack on August 10, 1977.

== Publication & critical reception ==
The Odessa File was first published in hardback in the United Kingdom by Hutchinson in 1972. Positioned between Forsyth's debut novel The Day of the Jackal (1971) and |The Dogs of War (1974), it formed the second entry in his informal political thriller trilogy. The novel rapidly became an international bestseller and was translated into multiple languages:

- German: Released in 1973 as Die Akte Odessa by Piper Verlag, translated by Tom Knoth. It topped Der Spiegel 's bestseller list for 12 consecutive weeks (April 9 – July 1, 1973).
- Spanish: Published in 1973 by Plaza & Janés for European and Latin American distribution, it was released under the titles El expediente Odessa and Odessa.
- French: Published by Gallimard in 1973 as Dossier Odessa.

=== Critical Reception ===
Reviewing the novel on its initial release, The Guardian wrote that "in Forsyth's hands the 'documentary thriller' had assumed its most sophisticated form".

Writing in the New York Times, Richard P. Brickner criticized the novel's characterization, writing that both Peter Miller and the novel itself "lack character" and that Miller is "merely another plotting device, with a moral fuse attached". He also argued that Forsyth had "borrowed painful, live history in order to spring a few quick thrills". However, Brickner identified Forsyth's historical narration and his command of technical detail as strengths, stating that the author described equipment and operational procedures with authority.

=== German Reception & Debate ===
In West German critical response was divided, largely reflecting ongoing socio-political debates surrounding Vergangenheitsbewältigung. Writing for Die Zeit, critic Hellmuth Karasek argued that exaggerating the SS subterranean network into an all-powerful "state within a state" bordered on fictional bravado. Reviewers such as Birgit Lahann in the Frankfurter Allgemeine Zeitung, questioned the ethical framing of a Holocaust survivor's suicide diary within a commercial thriller format. Despite critical debates, German readers made the novel a major commercial success, sparking widespread public discussion regarding the lingering presence of former Nazi officials in West German civil and judicial institutions.

== Adaptations & legacy ==
=== 1974 Film & Impact on Eduard Roschmann ===
The novel was adapted into a 1974 feature film, The Odessa File, directed by Ronald Neame, starring Jon Voight as Peter Miller and Maximilian Schell as Eduard Roschmann, with a score composed by Andrew Lloyd Webber.

Although the cinematic adaptation altered several narrative elements of the book, its international release increased scrutiny on the real-life Eduard Roschmann, who was residing in Argentina. Following pressure stemming from public awareness surrounding the book and film, Argentine authorities initiated steps toward his arrest; Roschmann subsequently fled to Asunción, Paraguay, where he died on August 10 1977.

=== Sequel Works ===
Two sequel novels to The Odessa File were written by Frederick Forsyth in collaboration with Tony Kent.

The first, Revenge of Odessa, was published in October 2025 after being announced before Forsyth's death in June 2025. A second sequel, The Odessa Assassin, was announced in early 2026 and is scheduled for publication in November 2026.

- Revenge of Odessa (2025, Penguin Books, ISBN 978-0-85750-690-0)
- The Odessa Assassin (2026, Bantam Books, ISBN 978-1-91175-437-4)

== See also ==
- Ratlines (World War II)
- Vergangenheitsbewältigung
- Frankfurt Auschwitz Trials
- Simon Wiesenthal
- Eduard Roschmann
