= The Fox (Forsyth novel) =

2018 novel by Frederick Forsyth

- First edition
- Author: Frederick Forsyth
- Language: English
- Genre: Thriller
- Publisher: Bantam Press
- Publication date: 20 September 2018
- Publication place: United Kingdom
- Media type: Print (hardback & paperback)
- Pages: 352
- ISBN: 0525538429
- OCLC: 978-0525538424

The Fox is a novel by British writer Frederick Forsyth, published in 2018 by Bantam Press. The story concerns an SIS Cyber operation run by Spymaster Adrian Weston.

== Plot ==
The British Prime Minister calls Sir Adrian Weston, former Deputy Chief of the British Secret Intelligence Service, and asks him to handle a sensitive case. The computers of the Pentagon, the NSA, and the CIA have been hacked by Luke Jennings, a British teenager with Asperger syndrome, who was subsequently captured in an SAS raid in London. Weston, an ex–Parachute Regiment soldier-turned-MI6 officer, devises a plan to take advantage of Jennings' skills in order to cripple Iran's nuclear program, Russia's intensification programs, and North Korea's nuclear program. Weston is assisted by Special Air Service Captain Harry Williams, and Avigdor Hirsch, Mossad operative and former special forces soldier. Yevgeni Krilov, head of the SVR, recognizes Weston's fingerprints on the operation and tries to thwart it.

== Reception ==
Reviews were good. The Washington Post called it "a classic thriller that's also eerily relevant". The Times similarly stated that this book proves that "Forsyth deserves his place among the thriller greats".
