= The Shepherd (novella) =

Novella by Frederick Forsyth

- First edition
- Author: Frederick Forsyth
- Cover artist: Chris Foss
- Language: English
- Publisher: Hutchinson
- Publication date: 1975
- Publication place: United Kingdom
- Media type: Print (Hardback & Paperback)
- Pages: 54
- ISBN: 0-09-125270-9
- OCLC: 2437079
- Dewey Decimal: 823/.9/14
- LC Class: PZ4.F7349 Sh3 PR6056.O699

The Shepherd is a 1975 novella by British writer Frederick Forsyth.

== Plot ==
The Shepherd relates the story of a De Havilland Vampire pilot flying home from RAF Celle in northern Germany to RAF Lakenheath in Suffolk on Christmas Eve 1957, when his aircraft suffers a complete electrical failure mid-flight.

Lost in fog over the North Sea, low on fuel, with no working compass or radio, the pilot begins flying in small triangles, an odd flying pattern which would typically be detected on radar, with the intention of notifying an air traffic controller to send other aircraft to find him and "shepherd" (i.e. guide) him to Merriam St. George, the closest airstrip he is aware of.

While making these maneuvers he encounters a World War II era De Havilland Mosquito fighter-bomber and recalls that the meteorological squadron at Gloucester had used the last of the Mosquitoes to prepare weather forecasts. The Mosquito's pilot uses hand signals to give the Vampire's pilot flight commands. At one point the Vampire's pilot sees the nose of the Mosquito, which has the letters JK painted on it.

The pilot follows the Mosquito, and when the Vampire's fuel gauge reaches zero the Mosquito pilot gives hand signals to indicate the oncoming runway and clearance to land. Suddenly, runway lights are powered on through the fog and the pilot is able to land the Vampire, with the plane running on empty. Expecting the standard protocol of a fire truck, ambulance and other vehicles to be sent out immediately following an emergency landing, he instead encounters a car driven by an older flight lieutenant. The pilot is informed that he is actually at RAF Minton, which has not been an operational station for years, and instead currently functions as a storage depot. With the stores clerks being on Christmas leave, only the flight lieutenant and a 70-year-old civilian mess steward were on duty at the time of the plane landing. When the flight lieutenant heard a low flying plane he had turned on the runway lights, which had never been disconnected.

The pilot makes a late-night telephone call to RAF Merriam St. George and learns that no local pilots were authorized to fly that foggy evening, which meant that the air traffic control tower had not been staffed: no one had been sent out to shepherd him to safety. He then calls the meteorological squadron and is told they had scrapped the outdated Mosquitoes three months previously. At a loss for answers, the pilot rationalizes that someone must have bought one of the old Mosquitoes, happened to be flying on Christmas Eve, saw a plane flying in small triangles, and led it to the storage depot, which had the closest airstrip.

The flight lieutenant tells him that Joe, the mess steward, is preparing a room for him. Joe starts a fire in the room's fireplace, brings the pilot food, and stays to talk. The mess steward reveals that he worked at RAF Minton for twenty years. During the war there had been many young fliers, the best among them John Kavanaugh, who had once occupied the room they were now in. The pilot walks over to a framed old photo of a young pilot beside a Mosquito, with JK painted on its nose. Joe reveals that during the war, after the squadron had returned, John Kavanaugh would refuel his Mosquito and go out alone, searching for any crippled bombers to guide them home.

The pilot assumes Kavanaugh must have bought his old Mosquito after leaving the service, still flew it on occasion, had seen a plane in distress and directed it to his old base, but before Joe leaves the room he tells the pilot that Kavanaugh died on Christmas Eve, 1943, when he went down with his plane in the North Sea.

== Notable readings and adaptations ==
A reading of the story by Alan Maitland has been broadcast "nearly every Christmas since 1979" in Canada on the CBC Radio One news programme As It Happens.

On 14 December 2014, actor Nigel Anthony performed an original adaptation by Amber Barnfather of The Shepherd, with music and sound effects, at St Clement Danes, the Central Church of the Royal Air Force, in London. The performance, in aid of the RAF Benevolent Fund, was introduced by Frederick Forsyth. Sound design was by David Chilton, with a cappella pieces from the Saint Martin Singers.

On Christmas Eve 2016, BBC Radio 3 broadcast a new adaptation by Amber Barnfather for Between the Ears, performed by actor Luke Thompson. Sound design was by David Chilton, with music and mouth/body percussion by the Saint Martin Singers, and Vampire aircraft sound effects recorded at the Royal Air Force Museum London. Between the Ears: The Shepherd won a 2017 New York Festivals Radio Gold Award for best sound.

In 2022, John Travolta confirmed that he was filming a cinematic version of The Shepherd on location in West Raynham, Norfolk. The Shepherd, directedy by Iain Softley, premiered at the HollyShorts Film Festival on August 10, 2023, and was released through Disney+ on December 1, 2023.

== See also ==
- List of Christmas-themed literature
