= The Negotiator (novel) =

1989 novel by Frederick Forsyth

- First edition (UK)
- Author: Frederick Forsyth
- Language: English
- Genre: Thriller
- Publisher: Bantam Press
- Publication date: 1989
- Publication place: United Kingdom
- Media type: Print (hardback & paperback)
- Pages: 448
- ISBN: 0-593-01647-5

The Negotiator is a crime novel by English writer Frederick Forsyth, first published in 1989. The story includes a number of threads that are slowly woven together. The central thread concerns a kidnapping that turns into a murder and the negotiator's attempts to solve the crime.

== Synopsis ==
In 1989, Texan oil baron Cyrus Miller and shipping tycoon Melvin Scanlon conspire to bring the oil fields of the Middle East under American control. Meanwhile, United States President John Cormack and his Soviet counterpart Mikhail Gorbachev draw up plans for a $100 billion arms reduction bill – the "Nantucket Treaty". This proves debilitating for Miller and Scanlon's plans, so they team up with three arms manufacturers who will be financially ruined by the treaty and hire mercenary Irving Moss, a sexual sadist and ex-CIA officer recently released from prison, to devise a plan to destroy the President and therefore the treaty.

The plan begins when the President's son, Simon, is kidnapped while spending a year studying abroad at Oxford University. When the Vice President demands an expert hostage negotiator to handle the situation, CIA Deputy Director of Operations David Weintraub nominates his old friend Quinn, an ex-Green Beret sergeant who later became renowned as the world's most successful hostage negotiator, but has since retired to Málaga and is not interested in working for the government. Weintraub coaxes Quinn out of retirement and he agrees to handle the negotiations if they allow him to do it his way. He is joined in his designated London flat, against his wishes, by FBI agent Samantha "Sam" Somerville and CIA officer Duncan McCrea. The kidnappers make contact and after two weeks of negotiation, agree on a $2 million ransom in diamonds, but are spooked by a fake news report that the police are closing in: Quinn steals the diamonds, evades the police and FBI and sets up the ransom drop himself, but is abducted and held in the kidnapper's hideout alongside Simon. Later, Simon and Quinn are released at different points on a deserted road, but as Simon runs towards Quinn and the police, he is killed in an explosion. President Cormack is devastated when he learns of his son's death: the possibility of his being removed under the terms of the 25th Amendment is brought up. A postmortem shows that Simon was killed by a bomb hidden in a belt given to him by his kidnappers: the bomb was set off by a minidet – miniature detonator – found only in the Soviet space program. The Soviets are blamed and the Nantucket Treaty is effectively finished.

Quinn is arrested by the FBI on suspicion of collusion with the kidnappers but subsequently released for lack of evidence. He decides to go after the kidnappers himself, and Sam – who has started falling in love with Quinn – is sent by the FBI to follow him. Quinn discovers that the kidnappers are a squad of mercenaries, but ends up finding two of them murdered. Later, the leader of the squad, who Quinn had primarily spoken to during the negotiations, makes contact with Quinn and Sam and reveals that the kidnapping and ransom were part of a contract from a fat American-accented man who kept his face hidden or masked, also admitting that the murder was completely unexpected and that his squad had no part in it, with the exception of a Corsican hitman specifically assigned to the squad by the contractor, who the squad leader reveals was responsible for acquiring the belt bomb. The mercenaries fled across Europe after Simon's murder, but the leader learned about the deaths of his squadmates and sought out Quinn in order to confess and surrender; while returning the diamonds, he is killed in a drive-by shooting from which Quinn and Sam only narrowly escape. Quinn sends Sam into hiding and travels to Corsica to confront the last mercenary, but is forced to kill him in self-defense. Flying back to London, Quinn is drugged, kidnapped and taken to the Russian embassy where KGB chief General Kirpicenko shows him photos of Miller, Scanlon, and the three arms manufacturers, who had been identified after paying an unexpected trip to a Russian airbase: it is believed they met with General Koslov, head of Soviet Southern High Command, and he gave them the minidet. Kirpicenko tells Quinn to return to Washington to flush out the conspirators and sneaks him into Vermont via Canada, secretly assigning an agent of his to provide overwatch on Quinn.

Knowing that the White House will have Sam's phones tapped and her mail intercepted, Quinn, hiding in a secluded cabin in the Vermont wilderness, sends her a (fake) letter stating that he knows who Simon's killers were and that he is holed up in some safe place writing it all down. Shortly after, Quinn finds Sam and tells her to be on the lookout. Sam tells Quinn that David Weintraub has been in touch and Quinn agrees to meet him, but they are instead met by Irving Moss (who has a score of his own to settle with Quinn that dates back to their days in the Vietnam War) and Duncan McCrea (revealed to be Moss' equally sadistic protégé, who turns out to have blown up Simon with the belt bomb personally). Quinn and Sam are taken at gunpoint back to Quinn's cabin where Moss reads Quinn's report, explaining that he and McCrea had been spying on them across Europe and killing the mercenaries before Quinn could reach them. Finding out that the report is fake, Moss leaves McCrea to torture Sam while he takes Quinn outside to execute him: however, Kirpicenko's concealed agent shoots Moss first, giving Quinn the chance to retrieve Moss' gun, return to the cabin and kill McCrea.

Searching the corpses reveals Moss' address book, which eventually yields a coded telephone number which Sam identifies as belonging to a very senior politician. Quinn calls the number and, mimicking Moss' voice, demands a bonus payment for all the 'unforeseen trouble' he has had to deal with, and arranges a meeting with the man at the 'usual place', which turns out to be near the Vietnam War Memorial. The man turns out to be Hubert Reed, the Secretary of the Treasury, who publicly supported the Nantucket Treaty but secretly opposed it for having his fortune invested in armament companies; the trustees of his blind trust had not moved the investments. He offers Quinn the $5 million Swiss bank draft (payable to the bearer) he had brought for Moss and Quinn hands over the report he has written, but the real report is later sent to the President, who then chooses not to resign and tells the world in a special broadcast the next evening what really happened to his son and why. In the aftermath, Cyrus Miller is arrested, but is declared certifiably insane and therefore unable to stand trial; Scanlon and one of the arms manufacturers are arrested and confess to the entire plot; a second flees the country and the third commits suicide; Koslov is apprehended by the KGB. The President orders the FBI manhunt for Quinn to be permanently called off: by then, Quinn and Sam have flown off to Spain to get married. A newspaper Quinn briefly reads, made redundant earlier by the President's speech, mentions a $5 million anonymous donation to the Vietnam Veterans Paraplegic Hospital and the "accidental and mysterious" death of Treasury Secretary Reed by drowning.

== Plagiarism ==
In 1990, Australian broadcaster Alan Jones had been a regular writer for The Sun-Herald when the newspaper announced that Jones' column would no longer appear following a petition by staff calling for his removal as a contributor. This followed Jones' publication of a column predicting an oil crisis, in which a large amount of the material had been taken directly from Forsyth's novel The Negotiator without any attribution or indication that the source was a work of fiction.
