= The Phantom of Manhattan =

1999 novel by Frederick Forsyth

- First edition (UK)
- Author: Frederick Forsyth
- Language: English
- Genre: Thriller, Mystery, Romance
- Publisher: Bantam Books (UK); St. Martin's Press (US)
- Publication date: November 1999
- Publication place: United Kingdom
- Media type: Print (Hardcover, Paperback & Mass Market Paperback)
- Pages: 204
- ISBN: 0-593-04510-6

The Phantom of Manhattan is a 1999 novel by British writer Frederick Forsyth, written as a sequel to the 1910 novel Le Fantôme de l'Opéra by Gaston Leroux, and to the musical by Andrew Lloyd Webber.

== Development ==
Frederick Forsyth, who had publicly retired from writing in 1996, spoke with Andrew Lloyd Webber at a dinner party in December 1997. Forsyth said he and Lloyd Webber, "got to musing as to whatever happened to the Phantom, Erik. At the end of the musical he walks into the shadows of the Paris Opera and disappears. Andrew said he'd never worked it out." When Forsyth returned home that evening, he gave the matter more thought. "I hadn't seen the musical in 11 years," he said. "I went back and saw it again. I'd never read the book. I read that. I got more intrigued."

Forsyth and Lloyd Webber had lunch and discussed the idea more. "Andrew had a couple of suggestions. He didn't think Erik could exist in France any more. He would have to emigrate and why not New York. I went home and mulled on it some more," Forsyth explained.

In October 1998, it was reported Forsyth sold the United States, Canadian, and audio rights to New Millennium Entertainment.

The beginning of The Phantom of Manhattan is narrated by an ailing Madame Giry, and set in the early 1900s. Famous individuals of the time, such as Theodore Roosevelt, are mentioned in the novel.

== Characters ==
- Erik Muhlheim "The Phantom" – Former Phantom of the Paris Opera, now an important New York impresario.
- Christine Daaé, Vicomtesse De Chagny – A famous soprano, and the Phantom's main love interest. She is married to Raoul and has one son, Pierre.
- Raoul, Vicomte De Chagny – Christine's husband. Speaks only French.
- Antoinette Giry – Former ballet mistress of the Paris Opera, rescued Erik from a circus when he was a child, and years later helped him come to the United States.
- Darius – Previously a runaway, ended up "a pleasure-boy in a house of sodomy", and eventually a son figure to Erik, as well as business partner, and ambiguous companion.
- Pierre De Chagny – Young son of Christine and the Phantom. Assumes Raoul is his father, but doesn't know his biological father.
- Charles "Cholly" Bloom – New York American reporter who wants to discover the truth about the Phantom.
- Father Joseph "Joe" Kilfoyle – Irish Priest and Pierre's tutor, who is secretly attracted to Christine.
- Meg Giry – Madame Giry's daughter. She was a ballerina at the Paris Opera before a crash ended her career.
- Armand Dufour – Lawyer contracted by Madame Giry to carry the letter to Erik in New York.
- Taffy Jones – Coney Island's animator, accidentally hears a revealing conversation between Erik and Christine.
- Jesus
- Mammon
- Gaylord Spriggs – Opera Critic

== Adaptations ==
By April 1998, it was reported Forsyth would be collaborating with Lloyd Webber on a sequel to Webber's musical, The Phantom of the Opera. Prior to the book's publication, it was already confirmed the book would serve as the basis for a planned Andrew Lloyd Webber musical. On April 7, a concert was held at Royal Albert Hall for Webber's 50th birthday, and Kiri Te Kanawa performed the song, The Heart Is Slow To Learn which had been written for the Phantom II musical Webber was working on with Forsyth.

The 2010 stage sequel to the 1986 musical The Phantom of the Opera, Love Never Dies, is based partly on The Phantom of Manhattan.
