= Frederick Forsyth =

English novelist (1938–2025)

Frederick Forsyth CBE
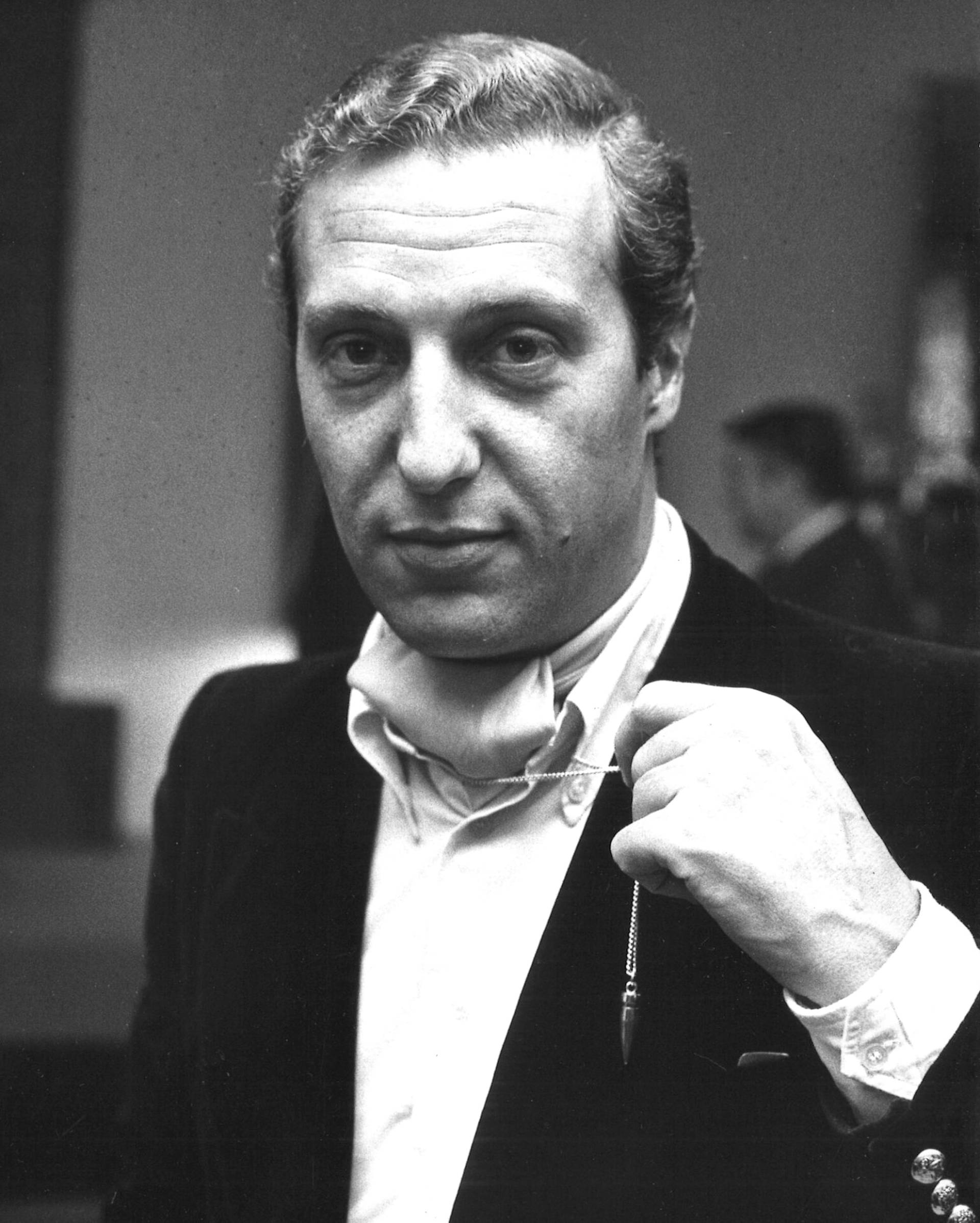
- Forsyth in 1972, showing the bullet that grazed his head in the Biafra War
- Born: Frederick McCarthy Forsyth; 25 August 1938; Ashford, Kent, England
- Died: 9 June 2025 (aged 86); Jordans, Buckinghamshire, England
- Education: Tonbridge School, Kent
- Occupation: Novelist
- Spouses: Carole Cunningham (m. 1973; div. 1988); Sandy Molloy (m. 1994; died 2024)
- Writing career
- Period: 1969–2025
- Genres: Crime fiction; thriller
- Notable works: The Day of the Jackal; The Odessa File; The Dogs of War; The Fourth Protocol; No Comebacks
- Military career
- Allegiance: United Kingdom
- Branch: Royal Air Force
- Service years: 1956–1958
- Rank: Pilot officer
- Service number: 5010968
- Website: www.frederickforsyth.co.uk

Frederick McCarthy Forsyth (/fɔːˈsaɪθ/ for-SYTH; 25 August 1938 – 9 June 2025) was an English novelist and journalist. He was best known for thrillers such as The Day of the Jackal, The Odessa File, The Fourth Protocol, The Dogs of War, The Devil's Alternative, Icon, The Veteran, Avenger, The Afghan, The Cobra and The Kill List.

Forsyth's works frequently appeared on best-sellers lists, and more than a dozen of his titles have been adapted to film. By 2006, he had sold more than 70 million books in more than 30 languages. He also worked as a journalist, first joining Reuters in 1961 before serving as an assistant diplomatic correspondent in 1965 for the BBC. He also frequently wrote a column for the newspaper Daily Express, often regarding political and social issues from Forsyth's politically conservative-leaning perspective.

== Early life and career ==
Forsyth was born in Ashford, Kent, on 25 August 1938, and was educated at Tonbridge School, a private boarding and day school in the market town of Tonbridge, Kent.

=== Military and journalism ===
Before becoming a journalist, Forsyth completed his National Service in the Royal Air Force as a pilot, for which he flew the de Havilland Vampire. He was commissioned with the rank of acting pilot officer on 28 August 1956, becoming substantive in that rank one year later. After completing his full-time national service, he was transferred to the Royal Auxiliary Air Force on 30 October 1958 with the rank of flying officer. He joined Reuters in 1961 and in 1965 the BBC, for which he served as an assistant diplomatic correspondent.

Forsyth reported on his early activities as a journalist. His early career was spent covering French affairs and the attempted assassination of Charles de Gaulle. He had never been to Africa until reporting on the Nigerian Civil War between Biafra and Nigeria as a BBC correspondent. He was there for the first six months of 1967, but few expected the war to last long considering the poor weaponry and preparation of the Biafrans when compared to the British-armed Nigerians. After his six months were over, however, Forsyth—eager to carry on reporting—approached the BBC to ask if he could have more time there. He noted their response:

I was told quite bluntly, then, "it is not our policy to cover this war". This was a period when the Vietnam War was front-page headlines almost every day, regarded broadly as an American cock-up, and this particularly British cock-up in Nigeria was not going to be covered. I smelt news management. I don't like news management. So I made a private vow to myself: "you may, gentlemen, not be covering it, but I'm going to cover it". So I quit and flew out there, and stayed there for most of the next two years.

Forsyth thus returned to Biafra as a freelance reporter, writing his first book, The Biafra Story, in 1969.

In August 2015, Forsyth revealed that in Biafra he was an informant for MI6, a relationship that continued for 20 years. According to Forsyth, he was not paid.

Forsyth did occasional radio commentary on political issues. He also wrote for newspapers throughout his career, and up until August 2023 wrote a weekly column in the Daily Express. In 2003, he criticised "gay-bashers in the churches" in The Guardian newspaper. He narrated several documentaries, including Jesus Christ Airlines, Soldiers: A History of Men in Battle and I Have Never Forgotten You: The Life & Legacy of Simon Wiesenthal.

=== Writing ===
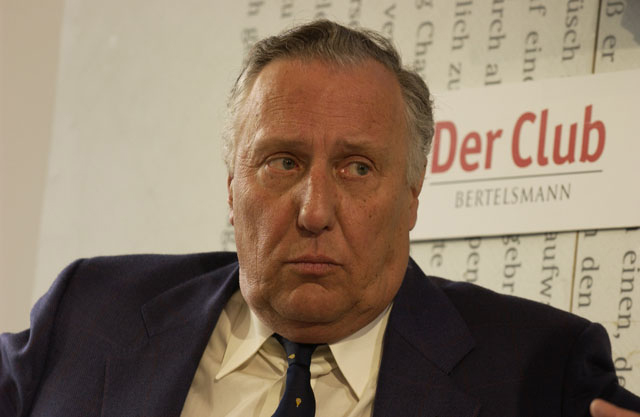
Forsyth in 2003

According to Forsyth, his turn to writing fiction was born of financial need; he did not think himself cut out to be a novelist. As a boy, he said, he wanted to be "a fighter jock," and when he traded his career in the RAF for journalism, it was "to see the world" as a foreign and war correspondent. As for becoming a novelist, he confessed "I never wanted to be a writer," but wrote his first full-length novel, The Day of the Jackal, because he was "skint, stony broke." He applied similar research techniques to those used in journalism. Published in 1971, the book became an international bestseller and gained its author the Edgar Allan Poe Award for Best Novel in 1972. In this story, the Organisation armée secrète hires an assassin to kill then–French President Charles de Gaulle. It was made into a film of the same name, and subsequently a television series.

In Forsyth's second full-length novel, The Odessa File (1972), a reporter attempts to track down an ex–Nazi SS officer in contemporary Germany. The reporter discovers him via the diary of a Jewish Holocaust survivor who died of suicide earlier, but he is being shielded by an organisation that protects ex-Nazis, called ODESSA. This book was later made into a movie with the same name, starring Jon Voight, but there were substantial alterations. Many of the novel's readers assumed that a centralized ODESSA organisation really existed, but historians asserted there was no centrally-organized network facilitating the escape of German Nazis.

In The Dogs of War (1974) a British mining executive hires a group of mercenaries to overthrow the government of an African country so that he can install a puppet regime that will allow him cheap access to a colossal platinum-ore reserve. This book was also adapted into a 1980 film starring Christopher Walken and Tom Berenger. The Shepherd was an illustrated novella published in 1975. It tells of a nightmare journey by an RAF pilot while flying home for Christmas in the late 1950s. His attempts to find a rational explanation for his eventual rescue prove as troublesome as his experience.

Following this came The Devil's Alternative in 1979, which is set in 1982. In this book, the Soviet Union faces a disastrous grain harvest. The U.S. is ready to help for some political and military concessions. A Politburo faction fight ensues. War is proposed as a solution. Ukrainian freedom fighters complicate the situation later. In the end, a Swedish oil tanker built in Japan, a Russian airliner hijacked to West Berlin and various governments find themselves involved. In 1982, No Comebacks, a collection of ten short stories, was published. Some of these stories had been written earlier. Many were set in the Republic of Ireland where Forsyth was living at the time. One of them, There Are No Snakes in Ireland, won him a second Edgar Allan Poe Award.

The Fourth Protocol was published in 1984 and involves renegade elements within the Soviet Union attempting to plant an atomic bomb near a U.S. airbase in the UK, intending to influence the upcoming British elections and lead to the election of an anti-NATO, anti-American, anti-nuclear, pro-Soviet Labour government. The 1987 adaptation as a thriller film starred Pierce Brosnan and Michael Caine and was co-produced by Forsyth.

Forsyth's tenth book came in 1989 with The Negotiator, in which the United States President's son is kidnapped and one man's job is to negotiate his release. Two years later, in 1991, The Deceiver was published. It includes four short stories reviewing the career of British secret agent Sam McCready. At the start of the novel, the Permanent Under-Secretary of State (PUSS) of the Foreign and Commonwealth Office requires the Chief of the SIS to push Sam into early retirement. The four stories are presented to a grievance committee in an attempt to allow Sam to stay on active duty with the SIS.

In 1994, Forsyth published The Fist of God, a novel which concerns the first Gulf War, Project Babylon and competition between intelligence agencies. Next, in 1996, he published Icon, about the rise of fascists to power in post-Soviet Russia. Forsyth then published The Phantom of Manhattan, a sequel to The Phantom of the Opera. It was intended as a departure from his usual genre; Forsyth's explanation was that "I had done mercenaries, assassins, Nazis, murderers, terrorists, special forces soldiers, fighter pilots, you name it, and I got to think, could I actually write about the human heart?" However, it did not achieve the same success as his other novels, and he subsequently returned to modern-day thrillers.

In 2001, The Veteran, another collection of short stories, was published, followed by Avenger, published in September 2003, about a Canadian billionaire who hires a Vietnam veteran to bring his grandson's killer to the United States. The novel was adapted into a film starring Sam Elliott and Timothy Hutton. Another novel written by Forsyth, The Afghan, was published in August 2006. Set in the very near future, the threat of a catastrophic assault on the West, discovered on a senior al-Qaeda member's computer, compels the leaders of the U.S. and the UK to attempt a desperate gambit—to substitute a seasoned British operative, retired Col. Mike Martin (of The Fist of God), for an Afghan Taliban commander being held prisoner at Guantánamo Bay.

The Cobra, published in 2010, features some of the characters previously featured in Avenger, and has as its subject an attempt to destroy the world trade in cocaine. On 20 August 2013, his novel The Kill List was published. It was announced earlier in June that year that Rupert Sanders would be directing a film version of the story. In September 2015, Forsyth's autobiography, The Outsider: My Life in Intrigue, was published.

In January 2018, it was announced that Forsyth would publish his eighteenth novel, a thriller about computer hackers, inspired by the Lauri Love and Gary McKinnon stories. The Fox was published in the same year as an espionage thriller regarding a highly skilled autistic hacker.

== Other awards ==
On 16 February 2012 the Crime Writers' Association announced that Forsyth had won its Cartier Diamond Dagger award in recognition of his body of work.

Forsyth was appointed a Commander of the Order of the British Empire (CBE) in the 1997 New Year Honours list for services to literature.

== Political views ==
Forsyth held politically conservative beliefs throughout his career and often shared his views on British and world affairs in newspaper columns and on television. In a 2013 interview, Forsyth summarised his beliefs as traditionalist and "conservative with a small c" and argued "I’ve never seen why anyone should be ashamed of loving one’s own country. It seems modish now not to, and I rebel against that. And for it, I’m called right wing."

He was also a Eurosceptic, and tended to support the Conservative Party in elections, although Forsyth also maintained that he had no direct interest in British party politics. He was Patron of Better Off Out, an organisation calling for Britain's withdrawal from the European Union, and he supported Brexit. In 2003, he was awarded the One of Us Award from the Conservative Way Forward group for his services to the Conservative movement in Britain. He was also a personal friend of Conservative Party politician David Davis.

Forsyth maintained that journalism should be conducted with objectivity, writing in his 2010 memoir that "a journalist should never join the establishment, no matter how tempting the blandishments. It is our job to hold power to account, not join it. In a world that increasingly obsesses over the gods of power, money, and fame, a journalist and a writer must remain detached, like a bird on a rail, watching, noting, probing, commenting, but never joining."

In the run-up to the 2005 general election, Forsyth called for the impeachment of Tony Blair over the 2003 invasion of Iraq and lent his support to anti-war campaigner Reg Keys who stood in Blair's constituency of Sedgefield. In 2016, Forsyth was featured as a character in Reg, a one-off BBC real-life drama about Reg Keys' campaign. In the programme, Forsyth was portrayed by Tim Bentinck. Forsyth was also critical of the term war on terror used by the George W. Bush administration, but argued "certain elements of Islam are at war, which they call Jihad, with the Christian-Jewish world."

Despite his conservative beliefs, Forsyth expressed criticism of Christian right attitudes towards homosexuals in a 2003 opinion column for The Daily Express.

Forsyth often appeared on BBC's political panel show Question Time as a guest; he also expressed scepticism on the subject of anthropogenic climate change in a Daily Express column he wrote often.

== Personal life and death ==
Forsyth married former model Carole Cunningham in 1973. The marriage, which produced two children, ended in divorce in 1988. He married Sandy Molloy in 1994. Molloy died in October 2024. He also had a relationship with actress Faye Dunaway. Forsyth previously resided in a 26-room manor house in East End Green, Hertfordshire, with his family before moving to Buckinghamshire in 2010.

In 2016, he said he was giving up writing thrillers because his wife had told him he was too old to travel to dangerous places.

Forsyth died aged 86, at his home in Jordans, Buckinghamshire, on 9 June 2025, following a brief illness.

== Bibliography ==
Works by Frederick Forsyth
Title	Year	Notes	Ref.
The Biafra Story	1969	Non-fiction. 1977 edition titled The Biafra Story: The Making of an African Legend.	
The Day of the Jackal	1971	Adapted into the 1973 film of the same name and the 2024 TV series of the same name.	
The Odessa File	1972	Adapted into the 1974 film of the same name.	
The Dogs of War	1974	Adapted into the 1980 film of the same name.	
The Shepherd	1975	Illustrated short story.	
The Devil's Alternative	1979		
Emeka	1982	Biography of C. Odumegwu Ojukwu, President of Biafra.	
No Comebacks	1982	Collection consisting of ten short stories.	
The Fourth Protocol	1984	Adapted into the 1987 film of the same name.	
The Negotiator	1989		
The Deceiver	1991		
Great Flying Stories	1991	Compiled, edited and introduced by Forsyth. Features his 1975 story "The Shepherd" and "The Black Aeroplane"	
Sharp Practice	1992	An audiobook of three short stories from No Comebacks, read by Edward de Souza	
The Fist of God	1994		
Icon	1996	Adapted into 2005 television film.	
The Phantom of Manhattan	1999	Partly adapted into the 2010 romantic musical Love Never Dies.	
The Veteran	2001	Collection consisting of five short stories: "The Veteran", "The Art of the Matter", "The Miracle", "The Citizen", and "Whispering Wind".	
Avenger	2003	Adapted into 2006 television film.	
The Afghan	2006	Characters from The Fist of God reappear.	
The Cobra	2010		
The Kill List	2013		
The Outsider: My Life in Intrigue	2015	Autobiography. Published in September 2015.	
The Fox	2018		
Revenge of Odessa	2025	Sequel to The Odessa File. Written with Tony Kent.	
The Odessa Assassin	2026	Sequel to Revenge of Odessa, and third book in the Odessa series. Written with Tony Kent.	

The following four works listed above are not fictional novels or novellas: The Biafra Story (1969), Emeka (1982), Great Flying Stories (1991) and The Outsider (2015).

== Filmography ==
As writer only.

=== Film ===
Year	Title	Notes	Ref.
1973	The Day of the Jackal	Adapted from The Day of the Jackal	
1974	The Odessa File	Adapted from The Odessa File	
1980	The Dogs of War	Adapted from The Dogs of War	
1987	The Fourth Protocol	Adapted from The Fourth Protocol	
1997	The Jackal	Based on the 1973 film	
2023	The Shepherd	Adapted from The Shepherd	

=== Television ===
Year	Title	Notes	Ref.
1973	Money with Menaces	TV play; one of 10 short stories in No Comebacks	
1980	Cry of the Innocent	TV film	
1984	Two by Forsyth	2 episodes: "Privilege" and "A Careful Man"	
1989–90	Frederick Forsyth Presents	6 episodes; as writer and presenter	
1996	Code Name: Wolverine	TV film	
2005	Icon	TV film; adapted from Icon	
2006	Avenger	TV film; adapted from Avenger	
2024	The Day of the Jackal	Adapted from The Day of the Jackal	

=== Theatre ===
Year	Title	Notes
2010	Love Never Dies	West End; partially adapted from The Phantom of Manhattan

=== Video ===
Year	Title	Notes
2012	Love Never Dies	Direct-to-video

=== Video games ===
Year	Title	Notes
1985	The Fourth Protocol	Adapted from The Fourth Protocol

=== Music videos ===
Year	Title	Artist
2016	"Fallen Soldier"	Melissa Alder

== Music ==
Forsyth wrote lyrics to a lament titled "Fallen Soldier", with music by Gareth Ellis Williams, which was released as a single by Royal Opera House soprano Melissa Alder in 2016.

== See also ==
- List of bestselling novels in the United States
