= The Kill List =

2013 novel by Frederick Forsyth

- Author: Frederick Forsyth
- Language: English
- Genre: Suspense; Thriller
- Published: Random House in 2013
- Publication place: United States
- Media type: Print (paperback)
- Pages: 352 (paperback)
- ISBN: 9780552170154
- Preceded by: The Cobra

The Kill List is a novel by English writer Frederick Forsyth, published in 2013 by Random House. The story concerns the response to murders by Muslim radicals.

== Plot ==
Several random mid-level authority figures in the United States and Great Britain are brutally murdered by Islamist extremists, all of whom seem to have been radicalized by the online sermons of a mysterious veiled man known only as "the Preacher". Perplexed by his unknown origins and his flawless command of the English language, the U.S. government soon places him on the Kill List, a list approved by the U.S. President and his senior advisors of individuals who are to be eliminated as soon as possible.

The agency charged with finding and killing the people on the list is the Technical Operations Support Activity or TOSA. It soon dispatches its best headhunter, a retired Marine lieutenant colonel known to most only as "the Tracker" (who also has a personal agenda in this matter, as his father was murdered by one of the Preacher's followers), to discover the Preacher's identity and eliminate him.

The Tracker's investigations are slow to progress until he recruits a young and very skilled aspyish computer hacker he codenames "Ariel" to act as his tech support. Ariel traces the digital signatures of the Preacher's sermons to find him somewhere in Somalia, but the Tracker realises that the Preacher must have an ally in England to broadcast his sermons from and act as a middleman between the Preacher and his followers. The Tracker's investigation into the Preacher's history uncovers a British Pakistani pickle mogul who he discovers to be a childhood friend of the Preacher, and Ariel obtains his IP address to uncover the Preacher's location.

Even as more of the Preacher's sermons result in further violent shootings, TOSA's investigations remain fruitless until the Mossad reveals to TOSA that they have a Falasha agent codenamed "Opal" in Somalia, who they can use to get close to the Preacher: Opal eventually becomes part of the Preacher's inner circle, allowing TOSA to close in on the Preacher. Meanwhile, a band of Somali pirates belonging to another clan of Islamist extremists headed by a sadistic sheikh, capture a Swedish cargo ship. On board, the son of the ship's owner is working as a sailor under a fake identity. The sadistic sheikh takes the Swedish boy to torture him.

Ariel is eventually able to mirror the Preacher's channel, and the Tracker decides to force the Preacher into the open. With the help of a film crew, a skilled impressionist, and an actor who somewhat resembles the Preacher, the Tracker creates a fake video showing the Preacher exposing his personal history and confessing to be a fraud, which he has Ariel stream through the Preacher's channel. The video has the desired effect: the Preacher is unsettled and attempts to flee, allowing Ariel to follow both him and Opal via satellite.

The Preacher buys the Swedish boy from the sadistic sheikh, intending to personally behead him on his next livestream to make his followers believe in him again. The exchange is to take place in the desert. The Tracker, who has followed the exchange through Ariel's input, parachutes in the vicinity of the exchange with a British Army Pathfinder Platoon: they successfully rescue both Opal and the Swedish boy, killing all the extremists from both clans, and the Tracker personally kills the Preacher in a knife-fight.
