= The Cobra (novel) =

Novel by Frederick Forsyth

- First edition (UK)
- Author: Frederick Forsyth
- Language: English
- Genre: Thriller
- Publisher: Bantam Press
- Publication date: 2010
- Publication place: United Kingdom
- Media type: Print (Hardback)
- ISBN: 0-593-06421-6

The Cobra is a 2010 thriller novel by British writer Frederick Forsyth, about the international cocaine trade. In it, an unnamed Obama-like (said to have a wife named 'Michelle' and a deceased Kenyan father) U.S. President colludes with an unnamed Cameron-like (having a wife named 'Sam') British Prime Minister to put an end to the international cocaine trade and brings in ex-CIA Director Paul Devereaux who is basically given carte blanche to accomplish this task by any means necessary. The book re-introduces some of the characters from Forsyth's book Avenger.

== Plot summary ==
The prologue shows a young boy dying of a drug overdose in a slum in Washington, D.C. The boy's grandmother works as a maid in the White House. When the President inadvertently hears of this, he decides to end the international cocaine trade. Paul Devereaux, who previously appeared in the Forsyth novel Avenger, is tasked by the U.S. President to end the international cocaine trade. He recruits his arch-rival from Avenger: lawyer Cal Dexter, the protagonist and a highly decorated Vietnam War veteran who served in the elite tunnel rat unit, to help him with this task, as Dexter is, in Deveraux's words, "the only person who has ever outwitted [him]". Together they set up a joint Anglo-American task force operating from two converted grain carriers transformed into Q-ships to intercept cocaine shipments, destroy the ships and to detain the crews on a remote island. Both teams have access to a UAV that provides them with target information and other intelligence. Dexter also recruits a Blackburn Buccaneer pilot to shoot down the cartel's cocaine-carrying airplanes. He obtains a list of corrupt officials who allow the cocaine to enter their country and exposes them.

When the actions of both task forces and the pilot lead to major international cocaine shortages, Devereaux starts a disinformation campaign aimed at turning the international drug cartels against each other. Since this leads to out-of-hand gang wars with innocent bystanders getting killed, Devereaux is eventually asked by the White House to stop all operations. Dissatisfied by the White House decision, Devereaux cuts a deal with a drug lord promising him the cocaine captured by the task forces. He tells Dexter the location of the captured cocaine and tells him to destroy it. However, it turns out to be fake and Cal Dexter finds out about this and has the Buccaneer pilot destroy the cocaine-carrying ship before it reaches its destination. In the epilogue, Devereaux's assassinated body is discovered: the drug lord, Don Diego Esteban, has taken his revenge on him for breaking his deal.

== Reception ==
The novel has been lauded for its background research, but the Washington Post reviewer found the characters lacking in depth, and the plot often unconvincing, "a fantasy that spins out of control".

== See also ==
- Clear and Present Danger, Tom Clancy's 1989 novel with a similar premise
