= Avenger (Forsyth novel) =

Novel by Frederick Forsyth

- First edition (UK)
- Author: Frederick Forsyth
- Language: English
- Genre: Thriller
- Publisher: Bantam Books
- Publication date: 2003
- Publication place: United Kingdom
- Media type: Print (Hardback & Paperback)
- Pages: 347
- ISBN: 0-593-05093-2

Avenger is a political thriller novel by English writer Frederick Forsyth, published in September 2003. It was adapted for television as the 2006 film Avenger starring Sam Elliott.

== Plot summary ==
The first act of the novel introduces Calvin Dexter, the main character of the story. Dexter is described as a lawyer in his early fifties with a passion for running triathlons to keep in shape. The book digs into his past and reveals that he is a highly decorated Vietnam War veteran, and that his last tour of duty was as a tunnel rat, an extremely elite and secret task force that descended deep into the catacombs of Vietcong tunnels to hunt down the enemy in their own lairs. Dexter later married and had a daughter who at the age of 16 was lured away and forced into prostitution by Latino gangsters and eventually murdered. Dexter hunts down his daughter's killers in Panama and executes them, then returns home only to discover that his beloved wife couldn't deal with the death of their only child and has committed suicide during his absence. He moves away and becomes only a small-town lawyer in his public face. But when the reason and price are right, he transforms himself into the "Avenger" and delivers justice not by killing criminals but by 'rendering' them to the United States, so that they will stand trial for their crimes against Americans. Intertwined into the backstory of Calvin Dexter is the narrative of a young American volunteer from a very privileged family who was killed while delivering aid in Bosnia during the Bosnian War.

As the second act kicks off, the boy's grandfather, Canadian billionaire Stephen Edmond, hires a tracker to discover the identity of his sole grandson's killer and eventually learns him to be Zoran Žilić, a sadistic warlord and hitman for Slobodan Milošević's government. The CIA had followed the movements of Žilić during the war, but let him slip off the radar after the fall of Milošević. Edmond then learns of the services provided by the Avenger and hires him to pursue Žilić and bring him to trial. It is then revealed that a secret section in the CIA, headed by Paul Devereaux III, a dedicated patriot, has been working with Žilić in recent months with plans to use him as bait to eliminate another terrorist threat — Osama bin Laden himself. From the CIA’s point of view, Žilić, despite his horrific crimes, had been marginalised as a result of the end of hostilities in Bosnia and could be used to neutralise a much larger threat to the American way of life.

The third act details the actions of the "Avenger" as he tracks Žilić to his palatial and fully self-sufficient prison farm compound in South America. Meanwhile, the CIA operatives work furiously to prevent the Avenger from nabbing Žilić, but the Avenger is tipped off by an unknown ally that the CIA is onto him and he is able to outsmart them at every turn, successfully managing to transport Žilić to Key West and into police custody. It is revealed in the aftermath that the person that tipped Dexter off was an FBI agent acting on the orders of Devereaux's deputy, who turns out to be Dexter's old Tunnel Rat partner and mentor. Just as the story ends, the date is stated to be September 10, 2001.

== Characters ==
Some characters are historically significant, while others are fictional.

- Calvin Dexter/ the Avenger/ 'the Mole': The protagonist
- Stephen Edmond: A Canadian billionaire and veteran of the Battle of Britain who attempts to find his grandson, Ricky Colenso, and render justice after he learns that the boy was killed
- Ricky Colenso: Minor character and an American who is killed by Zilic when rendering disaster relief help in Bosnia
- Peter Lucas: A senator and Stephen Edmond's good friend, served as an OSS commando during the Battle of the Bulge
- Wild Bill Donovan: Briefly mentioned in the chapter that recounts Peter Lucas' background
- Group Captain Douglas Bader: In the chapter that recounts Stephen Edmond's background, he is briefly mentioned
- Paul Devereaux: A hardcore patriot and also called 'the Jesuit', he is an Arabist from the Central Intelligence Agency who has been given permission to orchestrate Project Peregrine despite the fact that Zilic, who has committed horrendous atrocities, is involved. He attempts to kill Osama bin Laden with Zilic's help.
- Kevin McBride: Devereaux's second-in-command for the Peregrine project. Also known as 'the Badger', it is revealed that he was Dexter's commander and long-time partner in the Tunnel Rat unit.
- Zoran Žilić: Antagonist. A warlord under Slobodan Milosevic
- Kulac: Minor antagonist. A hulking thug who Žilić brings as his bodyguard when he flees after the fall of Milosevic
- Slobodan Milosevic: His history is briefly recounted in the chapter that explains Žilić's background
- 'Arkan': A gangster who employs Žilić for a while.
- Dragan Stojic: A detective who 'the Tracker' and Dexter both talk to about Žilić
- Milan Rajak: A civilian who unwittingly becomes a witness to Ricky Colenso's demise. He is approached by the Tracker, Philip Gracey, in 1995 who tries to question him but he refuses to answer. Six years later, he is terminally ill and chooses to testify about the atrocities that Zilic performed.
- Philip Gracey: Also known as the 'Tracker', an ex-Special Forces man who Stephen Edmonds employs to find Ricky Colenso.
- Osama bin Laden: Indirectly mentioned and another antagonist who Devereaux is trying to kill with the help of Žilić
- Amanda Jane Dexter: Calvin Dexter's daughter
- Hugh Lamport: A minor character who finds Amanda's body
- Unnamed coffee drinker: Along with Hugh Lamport, he is instrumental to finding Amanda's body
- Emilio Gonzalez: Minor antagonist who recruits Amanda for prostitution and presumably helps to kill her. Fatally shot by Dexter.
- Benyamin Madero: Minor antagonist who contributes to Amanda's demise, he and his two hulking bodyguards are fatally shot by Dexter.
- Washington Lee: An African-American computer geek from Bed-Stuy who almost gets arrested for siphoning a significant amount from clients of a New York bank. Dexter helps his court case and he is employed by the same company that he siphoned money from. Later, he helps Dexter break into secure computer records to find Žilić's plane.
- Major Adriaan van Rensberg: Minor antagonist. South African and chief of security of Žilić's South American fortress
- Lieutenant Janni Duplessis: Another minor antagonist and one of the men under Renberg's command
- Ramon Guiterrez: A prisoner of San Martin who is sent to work at Žilić's farm compound. He looks fairly identical to Dexter, and is knocked unconscious with chloroform so that Dexter can replace him as part of his attempt to capture Žilić.
- Father Vincent Ramone: The priest hired by Žilić to keep the prisoners in check
- George Tanner: Air traffic controller at Key West airport
- Sergeant Austin: One of the police personnel involved in identifying Amanda Jane's killer
- Lou Ackerson: Chief Executive Officer of the bank that falls victim to Washington Lee's siphoning scheme.
- Mr Tolstoy: A client of the New York bank who realises that his account is missing funds and complains about it to Ackerson
- Major Maung: Vietnamese soldier who burns Dexter during a Vietnam War mission. He later seeks refuge in America, trying to live a peaceful life, but the immigration initially refuses to accept him. Dexter is given his file and defends him in court, after which he and his wife are allowed to stay on. Dexter later asks him to help create various false identities.
- Colin Fleming: Federal Bureau of Investigation officer who attempts to help Dexter seize Žilić
- Anna: A lady who speaks Serbo-Croat whose help Dexter asks for to talk to a reporter's mother so that he can find Žilić
- Inspector bin Zayeed: A legate who helps the FBI
- John Slack: One of the men in charge of 'Loaves and Fishes', a relief organisation that Ricky joins in Bosnia
- Fadil Sulejman: A 'Loaves and Fishes' volunteer who acts as Ricky's navigator, translator and guide. He is killed by Žilić in 1995.
- Gordon Bacon: Director of International Commission on Missing Persons
- Director of 'the Mirror'
- Captain Svetomir Stepanovic: Žilić's personal pilot, a former colonel in the Yugoslav Air Force

== Connection with other Forsyth books ==
- Forsyth describes in great detail how Saddam Hussein and Iraq invade Kuwait in the book The Fist of God. He also talks about this invasion in the chapter that explains Paul Devereaux's past and how it links to Osama bin Laden.
- Paul Devereaux eventually becomes the protagonist of The Cobra and hires Dexter as an accomplice.
