= The Fourth Protocol =

1984 novel by Frederick Forsyth

- First edition
- Author: Frederick Forsyth
- Language: English
- Genre: Thriller
- Publisher: Hutchinson
- Publication date: August 1984
- Publication place: United Kingdom
- Media type: Print (hardback & paperback)
- Pages: 447
- ISBN: 0-09-158630-5
- OCLC: 59083636

The Fourth Protocol is a thriller novel by British writer Frederick Forsyth, published in August 1984.

== Etymology ==
The title refers to the 1968 Treaty on the Non-Proliferation of Nuclear Weapons, which (at least in the world of the novel) contained four secret protocols. The fourth of these was meant to prohibit non-conventional deliveries of nuclear weapons, i.e. by means other than being dropped from aircraft or carried on ballistic missiles. This included postal delivery or being assembled in secret, close to the target, before being detonated.

== Plot ==
On New Year's Eve 1986, professional thief James Rawlings breaks into the apartment of a senior civil servant and inadvertently discovers stolen top secret documents. While a notorious and infamous criminal, he is patriotic enough to anonymously send the documents to MI5 so that they might locate the traitor.

In Moscow, British defector Kim Philby drafts a memorandum for the Soviet General Secretary stating that, should the Labour Party win the next general election in the United Kingdom (scheduled for sometime in the subsequent eighteen months), the "hard left" of the party will oust the moderate populist Neil Kinnock in favour of a radical new leader who will adopt a true Marxist-Leninist manifesto, including the expulsion of all American forces from the United Kingdom and the country's withdrawal from (and repudiation of) NATO. In conjunction with a GRU general, an academic named Krilov, and a chess grandmaster and experienced strategist, they devise "Plan Aurora" to secure a Labour victory by exploiting the party's support for unilateral disarmament.

John Preston, an ex–Parachute Regiment soldier-turned-MI5 officer, who was exploring hard-left infiltration of the Labour Party, is assigned to investigate the stolen documents and discovers they were leaked by George Berenson, a passionate anti-communist and staunch supporter of apartheid South Africa. Berenson passed on the documents to Jan Marais, who he believed was a South African diplomat, but who was in fact a Soviet false flag operative. SIS chief Sir Nigel Irvine eventually confronts Berenson with the truth and turns him, using him to pass disinformation to the KGB. Intertwined with the main story is a sub-plot involving Preston's son, who stays with his ex-wife who legally has custody.

As part of Plan Aurora, Soviet agent Valeri Petrofsky arrives under deep cover in the United Kingdom and establishes a base using a house in Ipswich. From there, he travels around the country collecting packages from various couriers who have smuggled them into the country either hidden or disguised as seemingly harmless artefacts.

One of the couriers, masquerading as a sailor, is assaulted by Neds in Glasgow and hospitalised, where he commits suicide rather than submit to interrogation. Preston investigates and finds three out-of-place looking metal discs in a tobacco tin in his gunny sack. He shows the discs to a metallurgist who identifies the outer two as aluminium but the third as polonium, a key element in the initiator of an atomic bomb. Preston reports his findings to his antagonistic MI5 superior, acting Director-General Brian Harcourt-Smith, who ignores them, has Preston taken off the case and requests the human resource department to arrange that Preston take leave. Irvine, however, suspects that a major intelligence operation is underway, and has Preston work unofficially for him to search for other Soviet couriers (his absence from the office being justified by the coincidental order to take leave). Simultaneously, he uses Berenson to pass a deliberate piece of disinformation to the KGB.

In Moscow, the director of foreign operations for the KGB, General Karpov, discovers Aurora's existence. He determines that the general secretary is responsible, and blackmails Krilov into revealing the plan: in contravention of the Fourth Protocol, the component parts of a small atomic device are to be smuggled into the United Kingdom, to be assembled and exploded near RAF Bentwaters a week before the general election. Irrefutable evidence will be left that the explosion was an accidental detonation of an American tactical nuclear weapon, leading to a general wave of anti-Americanism, support for unilateral nuclear disarmament and for the only major party committed to disarmament, the Labour Party. The day after they win the election, the hard left will take over and begin to dismantle the Western alliance in Europe.

Preston attempts, though fruitlessly, to uncover other couriers connected to the operation. A month into the investigation, a bumbling Czechoslovak operative, originally believed to be an Austrian, under the name 'Franz Winkler' arrives at Heathrow with a forged visa in his passport and is shadowed to a house in Chesterfield. Preston's patience is rewarded when Petrofsky shows up to use the radio transmitter that is located there. He trails Petrofsky to his rented house, where the bomb has been assembled. An SAS team is called in to storm the house, and wounds Petrofsky before he can detonate the bomb. Despite Preston's express wishes, the commander kills Petrofsky during the raid. Before dying, he manages to say one last word: "Philby".

Preston confronts Irvine with his theory that Philby deliberately blew the operation; the latter did not know Petrofsky's location but instead sent Franz Winkler with an obviously fake identity document to the transmitter's location and ultimately, to Petrofsky. Irvine admits to compromising the operation by leaking disinformation through Berenson to General Karpov that they were closing in on their suspect. In turn, Karpov (and not Philby) sent Winkler, sabotaging Plan Aurora. By sending Winkler, Karpov thwarted a British publicity victory as Irvine understood the implication that Petrofsky must not be caught alive or exposed in the media. Preston, however, is disappointed that Petrofsky was killed outright rather than arrested. Irvine also admits that Philby has indeed been passing intelligence to the British embassy in Moscow (via carrier pigeons), hoping to earn repatriation back to the United Kingdom, but he did not expose Plan Aurora, and even if he had, as far as Irvine is concerned, "he can rot in hell".

At the novel's end, Harcourt-Smith is turned down for the position of Director-General of MI5, owing to his poor judgment in the case, and subsequently resigns from MI5 altogether. Preston also resigns but, through Irvine, finds lucrative private-sector employment that enables him to obtain full custody of his son. Marais is apprehended by South African intelligence on his return to Soviet territory and Berenson's efforts are rendered unusable to the KGB, as Irvine intends to use his own spy network and plant the suspicion that Berenson was, in fact, a double agent, so that his information will be considered suspect.

== Locations ==
Most of the locations used in the book are real. For example, the named streets in Chesterfield, Glasgow and Ipswich are all real, though the numbering of the address in Compton Street, Chesterfield is different to the present day. The bus stop where the Russian Seaman is attacked is a real bus stop and located as described in the novel. Although Cherryhayes Close in Ipswich is fictional, the housing estate it is located on exists. Forsyth locates the street in between two of the real Close locations.

== Characters ==
- John Preston – MI5 officer since summer 1981 and the protagonist; last two years "heading up D Section [of F1 branch …] concerned with the penetration of extreme left-wing elements into Britain’s Labour Party", then on the loan to investigate the Berenson and Petrofsky case
- Jim Rawlings – minor character, professional jewel thief who exposes the treacherous Berenson after cracking his safe
- Louis Zablonsky – jeweller of Polish-Jewish origin, Holocaust survivor, fence for stolen diamonds, loving husband; soon killed by thugs but keeps honour among thieves to his last breath
- Kim Philby – British defector, married in 1975 to a younger KGB agent, father of two, still hard-drinking, now also keeping pigeons. Along with Krilov, Marchenko and Rogov, they make up the Albion Committee, which produces Plan Aurora
- General Secretary of the Soviet Union – never named, but modelled after Yuri Andropov: former KGB Chairman who left to the Central Committee in spring 1982 to become Brezhnev's successor. Frail and (terminally) ill, unable to walk, but still a brilliant mastermind, personally ascetic; "white hair, thick and lustrous in the May Day portraits … had almost vanished … gold-rimmed glasses". However, "he was seventy-five" in January 1987, as was Konstantin Chernenko (born 1911) rather than Andropov, who was born 1914 and died in February 1984, when the book was being finished.
- General Marchenko – "senior officer in the GRU, the Soviet armed forces’ own military intelligence arm ... expert on the techniques of internal security and of its counterpart, destabilization, and his particular area of interest had always been the democracies of Western Europe"
- Vladimir Ilich Krilov – "professor of modern history at Moscow University … walking encyclopedia on the subject of the Socialist and Communist parties of Western Europe; he specialized in Britain … frequent consultant for the International Department of the Central Committee"
- Dr. Rogov – "academician, a physicist … a chess grand master … one of the General Secretary’s few personal friends … several times in the past [used his] remarkable brain in the planning stages of certain operations"
- Brian Harcourt-Smith – Deputy Director General of MI5; vain, vengeful, and scheming
- George Berenson – Deputy Chief of Defense Procurement at the Defense Ministry, leaking secret documents
- General Karpov – 57 years old, First Deputy Head of The First Chief Directorate of KGB, de facto director of its foreign operations
- Major Valeri Petrofsky – the antagonist. 36 y. o., of KGB's "elite Illegals Directorate … trained for a decade to pass for an Englishman". Uses the fake name James Duncan Ross in his mission
- Jan Marais – Soviet false flag agent posing as a South African at the London embassy
- Sir Nigel Irvine – the Chief of the Secret Intelligence Service, or MI6; wise, effective and helpful
- ten couriers provided by several Eastern European secret services and appearing only briefly
  - Franz Winkler – one more courier posing as Austrian businessman, actually "a Czech. Five years ago he was a low-level gofer in the Czech Embassy in Tokyo. Name: Jiri Hayek" and "the most bumbling agent [Karpov's] files could unearth"

== Reception ==
Critical reception was mixed. The Washington Post pointed out that "As a plotter, [Forsyth] tends to rely a bit too much on unexpected or coincidental events", but concluded positively that the book presented

something new in Frederick Forsyth fiction; The Fourth Protocol has people in it unlike the one-dimensional characters of The Day Of The Jackal and The Dogs of War. They are interesting people, even the repellent ones. Four books and a few million pounds after Jackal Frederick Forsyth has become a well-rounded novelist. The Fourth Protocol is his best book so far.

In a sharp contrast, Michiko Kakutani in the New York Times admitted Forsyth's "knack for describing technical matters […] and such a deft ability to juggle the sort of little details spies specialize in" but considered the novel

unsullied by well-developed characters, moral insights or interesting prose. When the main story bogs down, Mr. Forsyth simply throws in a subplot […]
The problem with The Fourth Protocol is not that its premise seems silly [… but] that - unlike some of the author's earlier books - it becomes predictable, and so lacking in suspense. Halfway through, the reader knows exactly where it's headed. In the end, in fact, the novel resembles one of Mr. Forsyth's little atomic bombs - a kit "assembled from a dozen prefabricated, milled and threaded components."

== Adaptations ==
- In 1985, a video game was published for the ZX Spectrum and Commodore 64 home computers.
- In 1987, a film was released starring Michael Caine and Pierce Brosnan. Forsyth helped produce the movie.
