= The Jackal =

The Jackal or The Jackals may refer to:

- The Jackals, a 1917 French silent film
- The Jackals, a 1967 South African Western film
- The Jackal, a fictional assassin featured in the 1971 novel The Day of the Jackal, as well as in the 1973 film adaptation and the 2024 television adaptation of the novel
  - The Jackal, a 1997 American film, a loose remake of the 1973 film The Day of the Jackal
  - The Jackal, the soundtrack to the 1997 film
- The Jackal, a supervillain featured in Marvel Comics and an antagonist of Spider-Man
- Carlos the Jackal, a Venezuelan assassin and revolutionary
- "The Jackal," a 1993 Ronny Jordan song appearing on the television series The West Wing
- The Jackal, a 2010 Turkish film
- Jackie the Jackal, a villain from the television series Kim Possible
- The Jackal, the main antagonist in the video game Far Cry 2

== See also ==
- Jackal (disambiguation)
- The Jackal (nickname)
