= Jackal (disambiguation) =

Jackal is a small animal in the wolf/dog family of mammals.

Jackal may also refer to:

== Animals ==
- American jackal, a former common English name for the coyote (Canis latrans) of Central and North America
- Egyptian wolf (Canis lupus lupaster), a small subspecies of gray wolf also called the Egyptian jackal or wolf jackal
- Ethiopian wolf (Canis simensis), also known as the Simien jackal or red jackal

== Arts and entertainment ==
=== Fictional characters ===
- Jackal (The Day of the Jackal), the main character in the 1973 film
- Jackal (The Jackal), the main character in the 1997 film
- Jackal (Gargoyles), a character in the TV series Gargoyles
- Jackal (Marvel Comics character), a comic book supervillain
- Jackal (DC Comics), a terrorist in the DC Comics universe
- Damian Spinelli or The Jackal, in the television series General Hospital
- Dr. Jackal or Kuroudou Akabane, in the manga and anime series GetBackers
- Jackal, a species of extraterrestrial reptiles from the Halo video game series
- Red Jackal, a character from the G.I. Joe comics

=== Films and soundtracks ===
- The Day of the Jackal (film), a 1973 British-French thriller film based on the 1971 novel
- The Jackal (1997 film), an American action thriller film
- Jackals (2017 film), an American film
- Kantri, released in English as Jackal, a 2008 Indian film

=== Other arts and entertainment ===
- The Day of the Jackal, a 1971 thriller novel by Frederick Forsyth
- Jackal (video game), a video game released in 1986 by Konami
- Jackals (novel), a 1994 novel by Charles L. Grant
- "The Jackal", a song by Ronny Jordan

== Military and paramilitary ==
- HMS Jackal, eight ships of the Royal Navy
- Jackal (vehicle), a family of British military vehicles
- Jackals, a Serbian paramilitary group

== Sports teams ==
- Dallas Jackals, rugby team
- Elmira Jackals and Elmira Jr. "B" Jackals, ice hockey teams based in Elmira, New York
- New Jersey Jackals, professional baseball team
- Orlando Jackals, professional roller hockey team
- Philadelphia Jr. Jackals, ice hockey team

== See also ==
- Jackalman, a character from the ThunderCats series
- Jackyl, an American rock band
- "The Jackyl", a ring name of Don Callis (born 1963), Canadian former professional wrestler
- Jakkals, a small vehicle used by the South African military
- The Jackal (disambiguation)
