= Lexham Gardens =

Street in South Kensington, London

Coordinates: 51°29′45″N 0°11′31″W

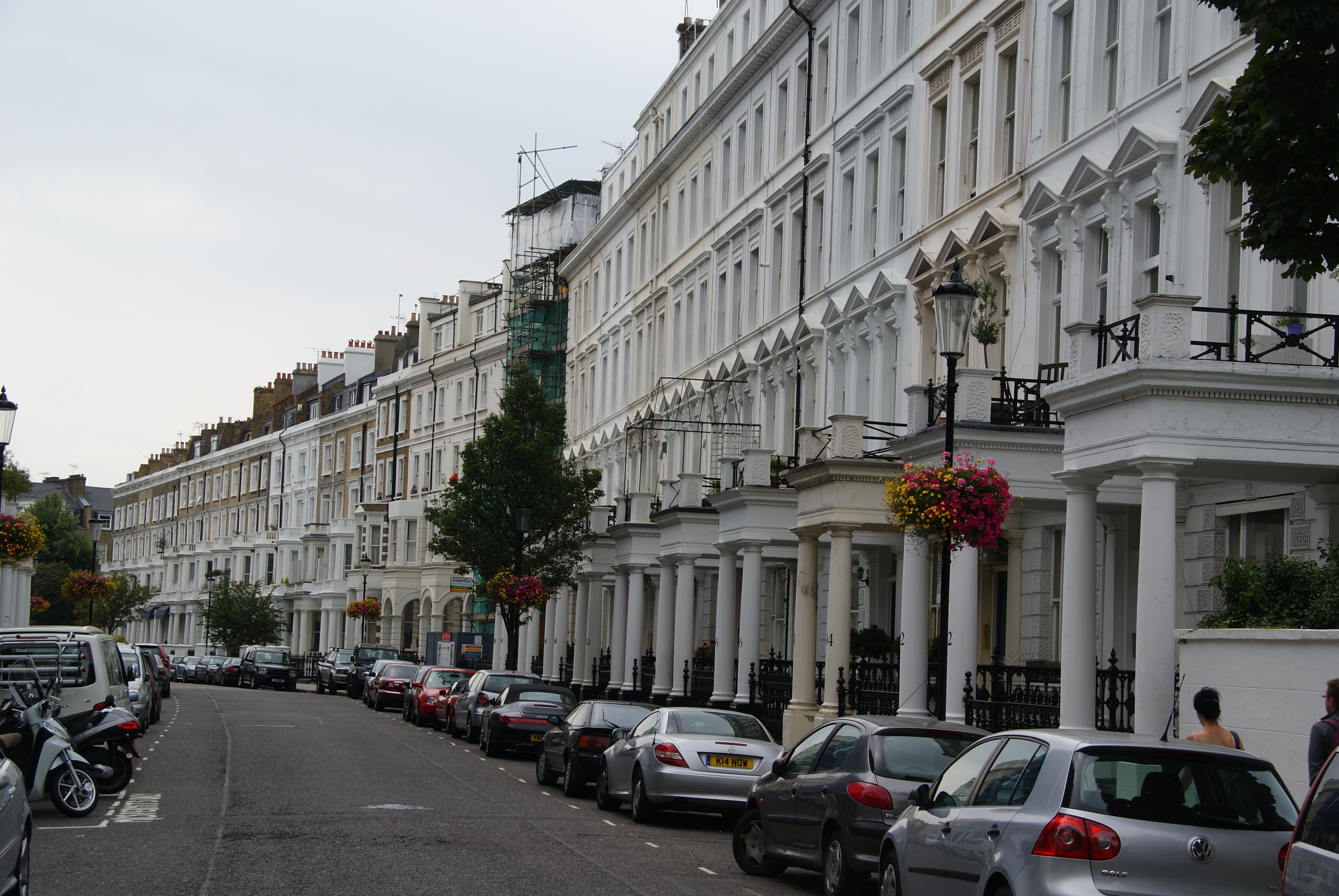
- Part of Lexham Gardens in 2011
- Interactive map of Lexham Gardens
- Postal code: W8

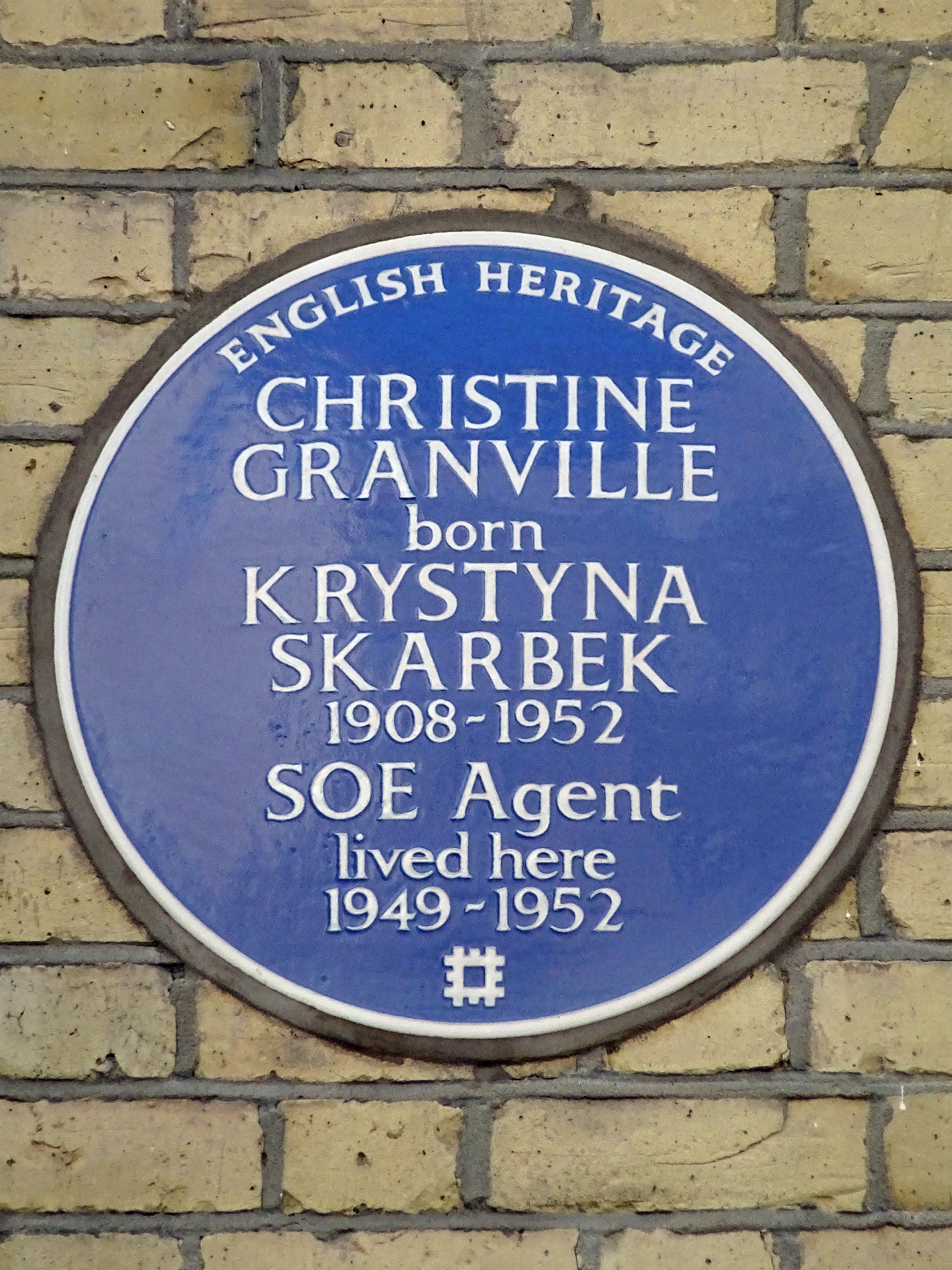
Christine Granville blue plaque at no 1

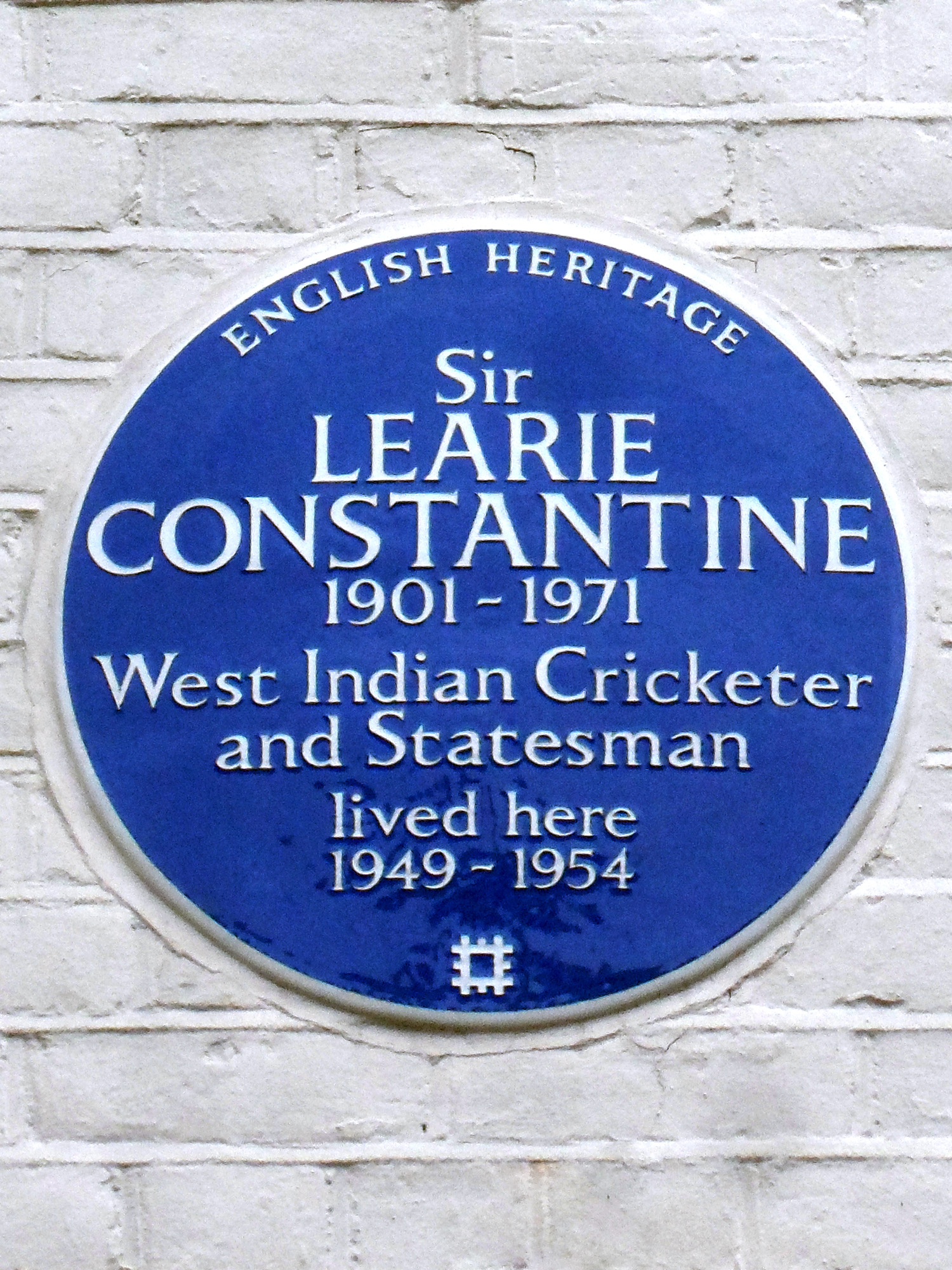
Learie Constantine blue plaque, 101 Lexham Gardens, Kensington, London, his home from 1949 to 1954

Lexham Gardens is a street in South Kensington, London.

Although somewhat irregular in shape, the largest part of the street runs west to east from Earls Court Road to Cromwell Road.

The Embassy of Bosnia and Herzegovina, London is at 5–7.

== Garden ==
Sir Cyril Taylor, the educator and social entrepreneur, purchased the freehold of a one-acre garden square, near to his London home in Lexham Gardens, by auction in 1989. With the assistance of designer Wilf Simms, he redesigned and replanted the garden, and saved it from the hands of property developers who wanted to build an underground car park underneath. In the garden's first summer of 1991, Lexham Gardens was awarded first prize in the All London Garden Squares Competition, competing against entries from 100 other squares.

== Notable residents ==
Notable residents include:

- No. 48: Denholm Elliott, actor, born there;
- No. 82: Sir Alexander Carmichael Bruce, the second Assistant Commissioner "A" of the Metropolitan Police;
- No. 91: Kenny Everett, comedian, radio DJ, and television entertainer; lived there from 1981 until his death in 1995;
- No. 101: Learie Constantine, English cricketer;
- No. 103: Sir Juland Danvers, administrator, and civil servant in India, lived there after retirement;
- No. 112: John Wykeham Jacomb-Hood, railway engineer;
- No. 114: Horace Bell, civil engineer, lived and died there;
- Derek Nimmo, character actor, producer, and author.

On 15 June 1952, Special Operations Executive (SOE) agent Christine Granville was stabbed to death in the Shellbourne Hotel, 1 Lexham Gardens, by an "obsessed" Dennis George Muldowney, who was hanged on 30 September.

Charles Bean, the Australian official war correspondent of World War I and future official historian of the war, shared lodgings with the future director of the Australian War Memorial John Treloar at no 1 for part of the war.

== In fiction ==
A house in Lexham Gardens is used as a 'safe house' for a meeting of British intelligence officers in John le Carré’s 1974 novel Tinker Tailor Soldier Spy, and in the 1979 BBC television adaptation of the novel. A mews off Lexham Gardens is home to SIS officer Tanya Acocella in Charles Cumming's 2011 novel The Trinity Six.
