= Walking boot =

A walking boot may refer to:

- Hiking boot
- Orthopedic boot
