= Edmund Ellis (cricketer) =

English cricketer and solicitor

Personal information
- Full name: Edmund Henry Ellis
- Born: 17 February 1841; Battersea, Surrey, England
- Died: 3 March 1910 (aged 69); Chelsea, London, England
- Batting: Unknown

Domestic team information
- Years: Team
- 1861–1863: Marylebone Cricket Club

Career statistics
Competition	First-class
Matches	3
Runs scored	31
Batting average	6.00
100s/50s	–/–
Top score	28*
Catches/stumpings	1/–
- Source: Cricinfo, 14 August 2021

Edmund Henry Ellis (17 February 1841 — 3 March 1910) was an English first-class cricketer and solicitor.

The son of George Henry Ellis, he was born at Battersea in February 1841 and was educated at Rugby School. Ellis played first-class cricket on three occasions for the Marylebone Cricket Club from 1861 to 1863, playing a match each against Hampshire, Middlesex and Oxford University. He scored 31 runs in his three matches, with a highest score of 28 not out. He was by profession a solicitor, having been admitted in 1864. He was married to Dorothea Hilda Danvers, daughter of Sir Juland Danvers. He later added her surname to his to be known as Edmund Henry Ellis-Danvers. Ellis died at Chelsea in March 1910.
