= The Jackal (nickname) =

As a nickname, The Jackal may refer to:

== People with the nickname ==
- Carlos the Jackal (born 1949), Venezuelan-born terrorist
- Carlos Bocanegra (born 1979), American soccer player
- Carl Frampton (born 1987), boxer from Northern Ireland
- Daniel Sentinelli, Argentine hacker
- Victoriano Huerta (1850–1916), Mexican military officer and President of Mexico nicknamed "El Chacal" ("The Jackal")
- The Jackal of Nahueltoro (1922–1963), Chilean mass murderer
- The Jackal of Pupunahue (born ca. 1930–?), Chilean mass murderer
- Robin Jackson (1948–1998), Northern Irish terrorist
- Jackal Kaizer or Janove Ottesen (born 1975), Norwegian musician
- John Purse (born 1972), American former BMX racer
- Guillermo Rigondeaux (born 1980), Cuban boxer nicknamed "El Chacal"
- Andrew Wylie (literary agent) (born 1947), American literary agent

== See also ==
- Amir Abdullah Khan Niazi (c. 1915–2004), Pakistan Army lieutenant-general nicknamed the "Jackal of Bengal"
- The Jackal (disambiguation)
