= Richard Cubison =

British actor

Richard Cubison is a British actor who has been active on television and in films since 1980.

His first television role came in 1980 when he played a "heavy" in an episode of Minder. He has also appeared in TV serials including The Cleopatras, Just Good Friends, Inspector Morse, Little Dorrit, Wycliffe, Pie in the Sky, Casualty and The Bill. He also appeared in as Antonin Dolohov in Harry Potter and the Order of the Phoenix in 2007.

He has also worked in the theatre, including a production of The Government Inspector in 1984.

== Filmography ==
Year	Title	Role	Notes
1987	The Living Daylights	Trade Centre Toastmaster	
1987	Little Dorrit	Mr. Simpson's Friend	
1990	Fire, Ice and Dynamite	Quatar	
1992	Christopher Columbus: The Discovery	Isaac	
1997	The Saint	Customs Officer	
1997	Wilde	Head Waiter	
1997	The Man Who Knew Too Little	Immigration Officer	
1997	The Jackal	General Belinko	
1998	The Commissioner	Journalist	
2007	Harry Potter and the Order of the Phoenix	Jugson (Death Eater)	
2011	The Best Exotic Marigold Hotel	Douglas' Golf Partner	(final film role)
