= Juland Danvers =

Colonial administrator of India (1826–1902)

Sir Juland Danvers
- Born: 19 March 1826
- Died: 18 October 1902 (aged 76); London
- Occupation: Colonial administrator in British India
- Spouse: Sarah Frances Rochfort

Sir Juland Danvers, KCSI (19 March 1826 – 18 October 1902) was a British administrator in British India, who was for many years Director of Indian Railways.

== Early life and background ==
Danvers was the son of Frederick Dawes Danvers (1795–1867), a former Secretary and Registrar of the Duchy of Lancaster, by his wife Charlotte Maria Rawlinson (1806–1891). His younger sister Emily Danvers (1828–1913) was the wife of businessman and Conservative politician William Henry Smith (1825–1891), and was raised to the peerage as Viscountess Hambleden shortly after her husband's death.

He was educated at private schools, and at King's College London.

== Career ==
Danvers entered the Home Service of East India Company in 1842, and was Private Secretary to two Chairmen, Sir James Hogg in 1846 and Sir Archibald Galloway in 1849, before he became Assistant Secretary to the company in 1858. On the creation of a Secretary of State for India in Council the same year, Danvers was made Secretary in the Railway Department of the India Office. He became Government Director of Indian Railways Companies in 1861, serving as such until her retired in 1892, and from 1880 to 1892 also held the office of Secretary to the Public Works Department. He made an inspecting tour in India 1875–76.

He was author of the book Indian Railways, their past history, present condition, and future prospects (1877).

Danvers was appointed a Knight Commander of the Order of the Star of India (KCSI) in 1886.

He died at his residence in Lexham Gardens, London, on 18 October 1902.

== Family ==
Danvers married Sarah Frances Rochfort (1831–1920), daughter of Rev. Henry Rochfort, of Vastina Rectory, Westmeath. They are buried in the churchyard of St. Mary the Virgin church at Caterham, Surrey, and there is also a memorial inside the church. Lady Danvers died in 1920. They had several children, including:

- Alice Stewart Danvers (1853–1865), to whom there is a marble memorial in the nave of the Caterham church by Matthew Noble.
- Frances Kathleen Danvers (1859–1935), who married in 1879 Charles Arthur Dingwall, wine merchant, and left children.
- Dorothea Hilda Danvers (b.1860), who married in 1885 Edmund Henry Ellis (later Danvers-Ellis), and left children
- Marion Audrey Rochfort Danvers (1862–1961), who married in 1893 Rev. Francis Christian Bainbridge-Bell
- Frederick Juland Rochfort Danvers (1863–1864)
- Mary Gertrude Danvers (b.1866), who married in 1925 John Danvers Power
- John Thornton Mervyn Danvers (1870–1880)
- Madeleine Bloomfield Danvers (1873–1960), who married in 1902 Eustace Ellis, solicitor, son of George Henry Ellis, and left children
