= The Day of the Jackal (TV series) =

2024 British television series

- Genre: Action drama; Spy thriller
- Created by: Ronan Bennett
- Based on: The Day of the Jackal by Frederick Forsyth
- Starring: Eddie Redmayne; Lashana Lynch; Úrsula Corberó; Chukwudi Iwuji; Khalid Abdalla; Lia Williams; Eleanor Matsuura; Sule Rimi; Ben Hall; Jonjo O'Neill; Puchi Lagarde; Jon Arias; Charles Dance; Nick Blood; Patrick Kennedy
- Opening theme: "This Is Who I Am" by Celeste
- Composer: Volker Bertelmann
- Country of origin: United Kingdom
- Original language: English
- No. of series: 1
- No. of episodes: 10

Production
- Executive producers: Gareth Neame; Nigel Marchant; Eddie Redmayne; Lashana Lynch; Brian Kirk; Ronan Bennett; Sue Naegle; Marianne Buckland
- Producer: Christopher Hall
- Running time: 46–61 minutes
- Production companies: Sky Studios; Universal International Studios; Carnival Film and Television
- Budget: £100 million

Original release
- Network: Sky Atlantic (United Kingdom)
- Release: 7 November 2024 – present
- Network: Peacock (United States)
- Release: 14 November 2024 – present

The Day of the Jackal is a British spy thriller television series, based on the Frederick Forsyth novel and 1973 film of the same name. It stars Eddie Redmayne and Lashana Lynch. It is written and created by Ronan Bennett, produced by Christopher Hall and directed by Brian Kirk, Anthony Philipson, Paul Wilmshurst and Anu Menon. The first series premiered on Sky Atlantic on 7 November 2024. That same month, it was renewed for a second series, which will premiere in 2027.

The Day of the Jackal received positive reviews from critics and received two Golden Globe Award nominations, Best Television Series – Drama and Best Actor for Redmayne.

== Premise ==
Reimagined into a contemporary political setting, this series is based on a popular novel which centres on a ruthless British assassin, known only as "The Jackal", and the intelligence officer intent on capturing him.

== Cast and characters ==
=== Main ===
- Eddie Redmayne as "The Jackal"/Alexander Duggan, an internationally renowned assassin. Duggan is a Sandhurst dropout and UKSF veteran.
- Lashana Lynch as Bianca Pullman, a former police officer, firearms expert, and now an agent in Section 303 of MI6, who begins investigating the Jackal.
- Úrsula Corberó as Nuria Gonzalez Martin, the Jackal's Spanish wife who knows him as "Charles Calthrop" and mother of their child, Carlitos.
- Chukwudi Iwuji as Osita Halcrow, a senior MI6 official in Section 303 and Bianca's direct boss.
- Khalid Abdalla as Ulle Dag Charles, a billionaire tech entrepreneur and activist who becomes the Jackal's target.
- Lia Williams as Isabel Kirby, the MI6 Deputy Chief of Staff, Bianca and Halcrow's superior.
- Eleanor Matsuura as Zina Jansone, an American liaison between the Jackal and her employer, Winthrop.
- Sule Rimi as Paul Pullman, an academic lecturer and Bianca's estranged husband.
- Ben Hall as Damian Richardson, an MI6 agent and colleague of Bianca's in Section 303.
- Jonjo O'Neill as Edward Carver, a 'fixer' within MI6, investigating suspected leaks in Section 303.
- Puchi Lagarde as Marisa, Nuria's interfering mother.
- Jon Arias as Alvaro, Nuria's deadbeat brother whose scheming endangers the Jackal's family.
- Charles Dance as Timothy Winthrop, a powerful financier and the Jackal's latest employer.
- Nick Blood as Vincent Pyne, an MI6 protection agent, former police and NCA officer and old friend of Bianca's.
- Patrick Kennedy as Teddy, Ulle's partner.
- Andreas Jessen as Rasmus, a worker at the Kontserdisaal in Tallinn

=== Special guest star ===
- Richard Dormer as Norman Stoke (series 1), the Jackal's gunsmith and a former "blackneck" in the Ulster Volunteer Force.

=== Recurring ===
- Florisa Kamara as Jasmine Pullman, Bianca and Paul's daughter.
- Kate Dickie as Alison Stoke, Larry's wife and Bianca's covert source in Northern Ireland.
- Patrick O'Kane as Larry Stoke, Norman's brother and a criminal associated with loyalist paramilitaries.
- Corey Johnson as Doug Wojack, a fellow conspirator of Winthrop's.
- Christy Meyer as Leonora Boggs, a fellow conspirator of Winthrop's.
- Adam James as Jeremy Whitelock, the Foreign Secretary.
- Gerard Kearns as Gary Cobb, a British Army special forces soldier who served as The Jackal's spotter.

== Episodes ==
No.	Title	Directed by	Written by	Original release date	U.S. airdate
1	"Episode 1"	Brian Kirk	Ronan Bennett	7 November 2024	14 November 2024
The Jackal, a highly effective assassin, stages a false flag attack, murdering multiple peripheral people, to wound Elias Fest, the son of far right German politician Manfred Fest. When the senior Fest visits the hospital, the Jackal assassinates him with a record distance sniper shot. Reviewing security footage of the Jackal, MI6 firearms expert Bianca Pullman realises he used a bespoke sniper rifle with a two-piece barrel. She theorises that the weapon was made by Northern Irish gunsmith Norman Stoke. An anonymous source offers the Jackal a new job. At an in-person meeting with the contact, Zina Jansone, he learns that the target is billionaire Ulle Dag Charles, who is about to release a disruptive technology known as River. The Jackal demands $100 million to kill such a high-profile and well-protected target. After the Jackal returns home to his wife Nuria, the person who commissioned Fest's assassination refuses to pay him the remaining $3.75 million fee. Bianca contacts her asset in Belfast, Alison, Norman's sister-in-law, to locate him. To put pressure on Alison, Bianca has her activist daughter, Emma, arrested. The plan backfires when Emma goes into cardiac arrest in custody.
2	"Episode 2"	Brian Kirk	Ronan Bennett	7 November 2024	14 November 2024
Bianca covers up Emma's death to force Alison to find Norman. Under his alias, the Jackal spends time at his home in Spain with Nuria and their son, Carlitos. He soon receives a lead on the source of the withheld payment for the Fest assassination. After dropping the Jackal at the airport, Nuria spies him by chance after he briefly returns to their town to visit his bank, leading her to assume that he is having an affair. In Munich, he meets with Zina again, who confirms that her employer, Timothy Winthrop, has agreed to his terms. However, the assassination must be completed within the month before Ulle can launch River. The Jackal later discovers that Elias was the one who hired him and is refusing to pay him after being shot. Meanwhile, pursuing her investigation of the assassin, Bianca theorises that he is British and former British Army. Alison obtains Norman's phone number, allowing Bianca to trace its location to Belarus, where she is sent to arrest him via Riga, Latvia. The operation goes awry and Norman kills two of Bianca's colleagues before escaping, leading her to believe that he was tipped off. Bianca focuses on a suitcase Norman left behind.
3	"Episode 3"	Brian Kirk	Ronan Bennett	7 November 2024	14 November 2024
The suitcase recovered from Norman's location turns out to contain a prototype for the custom sniper rifle that killed Fest. Her superiors, Isabel Kirby and Osita Halcrow, allow her to continue the operation. MI6 fixer Edward Carver begins investigating the source of the Belarus leak, with Bianca, her colleague Damian, Kirby and Halcrow under suspicion. In Germany, the Jackal calls Nuria, who confronts him about her sighting of him. He attempts to prove he is not having an affair, but Nuria remains suspicious. With the help of her mother and brother, she searches the Jackal's home office and finds a hidden vault. Alison and her husband Larry arrive in London to identify Emma's body. Alison angrily rebukes Bianca while Norman contacts Larry, learning what happened to him. Larry confronts Alison and attacks and subdues her upon learning of her betrayal. The Jackal murders and impersonates Elias' driver and abducts him to confront him before shooting him dead. Following a lead, Bianca discovers the assassin's codename: Jackal. Nuria and her family break into a second hidden vault inside the Jackal's residence that contains money, weapons, and a cast of Jackal's face, all while Jackal watches via CCTV as he leaves Germany.
4	"Episode 4"	Anthony Philipson	Ronan Bennett	7 November 2024	14 November 2024
Returning from Munich through France, the Jackal gets into a minor car accident and murders both a motorist and a police officer to escape. MI6 becomes aware that the Jackal has been hired again but do not know the target's identity. Bianca finds that the only British Army veteran considered capable of making the shot, Alexander Duggan, is thought dead from an IED explosion in Afghanistan in 2013. The Jackal convinces Nuria to join him in Paris, where he claims to be a troubleshooter engaging in corporate espionage, temporarily alleviating her worries. Meanwhile, Larry, having killed Alison, draws Bianca into a trap. She escapes with the help of protection agent Vincent Pyne, whom she asks to have reassigned to her team. She returns home to find that Larry has taken her daughter Jasmine hostage. Bianca shoots and wounds Larry, subduing him. The Jackal arrives in Tallinn to start preparations, nearly falling to his death when scouting the venue for Ulle's launch of River. Returning to his hotel room, he finds that Zina has tracked him down.
5	"Episode 5"	Anthony Philipson	Jessica Sinyard	7 November 2024	14 November 2024
In Tallinn, the Jackal is forced to include Zina in his planning. He contacts Norman to craft a weapon for Ulle's assassination. However, as Norman was wounded in Belarus, he explains he would not be able to deliver the weapon that the Jackal wants in the time frame needed for his next job without help. The Jackal travels to Budapest to help him craft the gun. Together, they build a short-ranged rifle that can be disassembled and hidden in an orthopedic boot. Norman confesses that when he was in Belarus, he was tipped off by someone in MI6, but does not reveal who. In London, in the aftermath of Larry's attack, Bianca's husband and daughter leave home to stay at Paul's ex-wife's residence. Bianca and Vincent torture Larry, who describes Norman's hideout. Bianca also uncovers that Ulle is the Jackal's target. MI6 narrows down the likeliest location of Norman's hideout, prompting Bianca and Vincent to arrive in Budapest. As he is out sighting in the rifle, the Jackal manages to evade capture, while Norman is subdued. The Jackal kills Norman to cover his tracks before escaping pursuit. Exhausted, he rests in a barn but is knocked out by a farmer.
6	"Episode 6"	Paul Wilmshurst	Charles Cumming	14 November 2024	21 November 2024
Taken prisoner by the farmer Attila, the Jackal attempts to negotiate his release. When this fails, he murders both Attila and his brother Gabor before taking farmhand Laszlo hostage to escape. Bianca's team learn of the deaths and begin investigating. The Jackal calls Nuria to confess he might not make it home. She offers to help him by coming to Budapest. Ulle, preparing for the launch of River in Tallinn, faces pushback from his board, which he ignores. Arriving back in Budapest amidst a national manhunt for him, the Jackal releases Laszlo rather than kill him, threatening him into silence. Nuria arrives in the city and helps the Jackal disguise himself as an elderly wheelchair user to get through customs. Ironically, he is seated behind Bianca on the flight to Tallinn. Upon arrival, the Jackal lures and seduces Rasmus, a worker he previously met at the venue.
7	"Episode 7"	Paul Wilmshurst	Shyam Popat	21 November 2024	28 November 2024
The Jackal asks Zina for help dealing with Bianca and Vincent. Zina sends a hit squad to attack them outside the British embassy in Tallinn, but Bianca and Vincent kill their attackers. Nuria's brother, Alvaro, steals a large amount of money and a gun from the Jackal's vault for a business deal, observed by the Jackal covertly on camera. The Jackal, posing as an architectural engineer, continues deceiving Rasmus to gain access to the venue. A police officer identifies the Jackal from an identikit. Bianca and Vincent raid his Airbnb, but he is staying with Rasmus. The Jackal infiltrates the venue and uses the building schematics Rasmus had given him to find a hiding spot, arriving before Ulle's security team locks down the building two days ahead of time. As he waits, he reminisces about the beginnings of his relationship with Nuria. The launch begins, and the Jackal goes into position to fire his shot. However, seconds before he gets his opportunity, another assassin attempts to shoot Ulle, ruining the Jackal's chance. He escapes the venue, but Rasmus finds and catches up with him. The Jackal reluctantly kills Rasmus before leaving the scene.
8	"Episode 8"	Paul Wilmshurst	Ronan Bennett	28 November 2024	5 December 2024
The second assassin is shot dead and found to be a security team member who had mental problems, and did not trust Ulle. Following the assassination attempt, the conspirators and Ulle scramble to keep their separate plans on track. Bianca turns back to her Alexander Duggan theory. Kirby successfully lobbies Foreign Secretary Jeremy Whitelock to declassify Duggan's Army file. Nuria sees a news broadcast with the identikit image of the Jackal and calls him, realising that he is an assassin. Bianca visits Larry in prison, but he commits suicide in front of her. Halcrow is detained on suspicion of being the mole. In flashbacks, the Jackal, revealed to be Duggan, is a sniper in a section arresting or eliminating Taliban leaders in Afghanistan. On R&R in Cyprus, Alexander and his spotter, Gary, are bribed for £40,000 by criminals to undertake a freelance assassination on the British-controlled military base at Akrotiri. An operation to arrest a senior Taliban leader goes awry when Duggan's section gets into a firefight and massacres a wedding party. They call in an airstrike to obliterate the evidence. Disgusted by their war crime, Duggan plants a roadside IED, killing the section, and tells Gary they must disappear.
9	"Episode 9"	Anu Menon	Ronan Bennett	5 December 2024	12 December 2024
The Jackal returns to Croatia to observe the security arrangements at Ulle's island home. Zina confronts him about his failure in Tallinn. Returning to Spain, the Jackal is confronted by Nuria. He admits he is an assassin and promises to quit after the hit on Ulle. Alvaro unilaterally sets up a business meeting between the Jackal and a local gangster, Jimmie. Nuria panics at the thought of their family being involved with a gangster boss with a brutal reputation. The Jackal fatally shoots Jimmie from a boat out in the sea to resolve the threat. However, report of the death catches Bianca's attention. Kirby ends the MI6 investigation suddenly, which angers Bianca. Halcrow remains under suspicion. The Jackal travels to Croatia and murders a local fisherman to steal his boat. During Ulle's morning swim, the Jackal kills his minder, shoots Ulle dead, then flees the area.
10	"Episode 10"	Anu Menon	Ronan Bennett	12 December 2024	12 December 2024
River's release is postponed indefinitely. Bianca quits MI6, as Kirby refuses to keep pursuing the Jackal. Kirby is revealed to be acting under orders from Whitelock, together secretly working for Winthrop. Kirby lures Bianca with an unsanctioned operation to kill the Jackal. Bianca accepts the job, recruiting Vincent. They follow a lead to stake out the Jackal's Spanish estate, which Nuria eventually abandons with Carlitos. While attempting to leave Croatia, the Jackal sustains wounds and kidnaps an elderly couple. He kills them when they attempt to overpower him and eventually returns home. Bianca and Vincent infiltrate the house, but a drunken Alvaro startles them and gets himself shot and killed, alerting the Jackal. The Jackal then kills Vincent and Bianca. Fleeing the house, the Jackal is ambushed by Winthrop's men. Kirby is later promoted to Chief. She claims that Bianca and Vincent went rogue, but Halcrow knows the truth thanks to a final text message from Bianca. In Budapest, the Jackal meets with Zina, who also escaped an attempt on her life. She reveals Winthrop's identity as her employer. The Jackal agrees to exact revenge but heads off in search of Nuria and Carlitos first.

== Production ==
The project for Carnival Films with Sky and Peacock was announced in November 2022. The screenwriter Ronan Bennett was set as writer and showrunner, with Brian Kirk as the lead director, followed by Anthony Philipson, Paul Wilmshurst and Anu Menon. Charles Cumming, Jessica Sinyard and Shyam Popat joined the writer's room in July 2022. Christopher Hall produced all episodes, while Forsyth served as consulting producer. Eddie Redmayne, Lashana Lynch, Ronan Bennett, Gareth Neame, Nigel Marchant and Marianne Buckland are executive producers. The series is a reimagining of the source text in a modern setting, with Redmayne describing it as "a completely different piece" that has "been reconceived and contemporised with a new target". The series also gives more of an insight into the Jackal as a protagonist and Redmayne said he chose the project because "the idea of getting to spend a proper amount of time with this enigma felt like great material to mine".

On 22 November 2024, The Day of the Jackal was renewed for a second season.

=== Casting ===
Redmayne was revealed to be in the cast in March 2023. In June 2023, Lashana Lynch joined the cast. Additional casting including Úrsula Corberó, Charles Dance, Richard Dormer and Chukwudi Iwuji was announced in February 2024. In February 2026, Weruche Opia and Pablo Schreiber were cast as regulars for the second season. In May 2026, Matt Bomer joined the cast and implied to be playing a villain.

=== Filming ===
Filming for the series, taking place in four countries and expected to last seven months, was started in June 2023. The shoot began in Budapest, Hungary and its neighbouring regions. Filming took place in Vienna in July 2023. Filming took place in the autumn of 2023 in Croatia. Croatian locations include Rijeka, Pag, Opatija, and the central Istrian region. The external shots of The Jackal's property were filmed in Rabac, Croatia.

Production of the second season began in February 2026.

== Broadcast ==
The ten-episode series premiered on 7 November 2024, airing in the United Kingdom on Sky Atlantic and Now, and streaming on Peacock in the United States. NBCUniversal Global Distribution distributes the series internationally outside of Sky's markets, airing through its agreements with Foxtel (Australia), Showcase (Canada), JioCinema (India), Showmax (Africa), TVNZ+ (New Zealand), Disney+ (Latin America) and SkyShowtime (Europe) among others. Subsequent episodes were released weekly, concluding on 12 December. NBC broadcast the pilot on US television on 30 December 2024.

== Reception ==
On the review aggregator website Rotten Tomatoes, The Day of the Jackal has an approval rating of 85% with an average rating of 7.6/10, based on 52 reviews. The website's consensus reads: "A globetrotting thriller made eerily plausible by Eddie Redmayne's reptilian performance, The Day of the Jackal turns dark deeds into good fun." Metacritic, which uses a weighted average, assigned a score of 72 out of 100 based on 28 critics, indicating "generally favorable" reviews.

Richard Roeper of the Chicago Sun-Times gave it three and a half out of four stars, saying, "From Eddie Redmayne as the titular character to the gorgeous and expansive location shoots in London, Budapest, Vienna and Croatia to the major action set pieces ... Clichéd as it might be to say this, each of the 10 chapters is more like a movie than an episode of television. [...] This is one big small-screen thriller."

Writing for The Guardian, Rebecca Nicholson gave it four out of five stars, calling it "a taut, lean drama that makes the most out of its acting talent and lays the foundations for a whole lot of well‑executed action. Watching the Jackal carry out his assignments and get away with his audacious plans – despite terrible odds to the contrary – is genuinely exciting. Even though you know he is probably not going to get caught, every checkpoint has you holding your breath, just in case he messes up."

David Fear of Rolling Stone praised the two leads, but felt the show's runtime was bloated, writing that Redmayne is "one of the best things about this updated Jackal, especially when the series slows down to procedural speed and simply observes the professional killer researching his jobs, scouting locations, shooting target practice. It also benefits from giving him a worthy adversary in the form of Lashana Lynch, who’s a master thief when it comes to stealing scenes. [...] Had The Day of the Jackal kept its eyes on the prize that is the predator/prey/pursuer plotline, it could have been prestige-pulp gold. Instead, it gilds the lily with unnecessary backstory and peripheral melodrama allegedly designed to “flesh out” characters, and you’re left with an epic amount of gorgeous, globetrotting Mid TV."

== Accolades ==
Award	Date of ceremony	Category	Nominee(s)	Result	Ref.
Golden Globe Awards	January 5, 2025	Best Television Series – Drama	The Day of the Jackal	Nominated	
Golden Globe Awards	January 5, 2025	Best Actor in a Television Series – Drama	Eddie Redmayne	Nominated	
Critics Choice Awards	January 26, 2025	Best Drama Series	The Day of the Jackal	Nominated	
Critics Choice Awards	January 26, 2025	Best Actor in a Drama Series	Eddie Redmayne	Nominated	
Satellite Awards	January 26, 2025	Best Actor in a Drama or Genre Series	Eddie Redmayne	Nominated	
Screen Actors Guild Awards	February 23, 2025	Outstanding Performance by a Male Actor in a Drama Series	Eddie Redmayne	Nominated	
Screen Actors Guild Awards	February 23, 2025	Outstanding Performance by an Ensemble in a Drama Series	Khalid Abdalla, Jon Arias, Nick Blood, Úrsula Corberó, Charles Dance, Ben Hall, Chukwudi Iwuji, Patrick Kennedy, Puchi Lagarde, Lashana Lynch, Eleanor Matsuura, Jonjo O'Neill, Eddie Redmayne, Sule Rimi, and Lia Williams	Nominated	
Critics' Choice Super Awards	August 7, 2025	Best Action Series, Limited Series or Made-for-TV Movie	The Day of the Jackal	Nominated	
Critics' Choice Super Awards	August 7, 2025	Best Actor in an Action Series, Limited Series or Made-for-TV Movie	Eddie Redmayne	Nominated	
Critics' Choice Super Awards	August 7, 2025	Best Actress in an Action Series, Limited Series or Made-for-TV Movie	Lashana Lynch	Nominated	
Primetime Emmy Awards	September 6, 2025	Outstanding Cinematography for a Series (One Hour)	Christopher Ross (for "Episode 1")	Nominated	

== See also ==
- The Day of the Jackal, 1973 British-French film based on the book
- The Jackal, 1997 American film based on the character from the book
