= Horace Bell (engineer) =

- Born: 17 June 1839; 81 Guilford Street, London, England
- Died: 10 April 1903 (aged 63); 114 Lexham Gardens, Brompton, London, England
- Occupations: Civil engineer Writer
- Spouse: Marcia Napier Ogilvy/Bell (1850-1940)
- Children: 4s, 5d
- Parent(s): George Bell, Frances Dude/Bell

Horace Bell (17 June 1839 – 10 April 1903) was an English civil engineer. As his career progressed he also became increasingly prolific as an author.

After eight years working in England as a railway engineer Bell relocated to British India (as it was known at the time), where he was in charge of several major railway and related construction projects. He retired in 1894 after which he returned, this time permanently, to England, but he continued to work for several Indian railway companies on a consultancy basis.

He wrote several pamphlets and books on railways policy, later also producing lengthy pamphlets on Economics and on Governance which were used as teaching material in government schools.

== Life ==
=== Provenance and education ===
Horace Bell was born the son of a London merchant, George Bell and his wife, Frances. He was christened at St Pancras Old Church in London. The boy was educated in Louth in Lincolnshire and overseas, in France. Half a century later an obituary would describe him as a "fluent French scholar".

=== Early career ===
When he was 15 Bell embarked on an engineering apprenticeship with John Wilson in Westminster, but soon he moved on to work for the firm D. Cook & Co in Glasgow, in order to gain a broader experience in the engineering field. He then took a job with the Caledonian Railway company, working both in the company workshops and on surveying for railway line construction. In 1859 he returned to England, working till 1862 as en assistant engineer for the newly created London, Chatham and Dover Railway company.

=== India ===
On 7 July 1862 he joined the Indian public works department as an assistant engineer, initially on a trial basis, and arriving in India at the end of the year. In India he was sent to the Central Provinces region, where he worked under the direction of J.S. Heyman on the building of the Great Deccan Road, part of a strategically important piece of road infrastructure linking the cities then known as Calcutta and Bombay. He was employed on the Great Deccan Road project for eight years, between 1862 and 1870, achieving a succession of promotions during the period, in March 1869 becoming Second Grade Executive Engineer. His name appears in connection with frequent commendations in official reports provided to and by imperial administrators of the period.

The establishment during Lord Mayo's term as viceroy, of the State Railway Service in May 1870 heralded a period of great railway expansion across India, which would have the effect of transforming a series of regionally based services into a national network. Horace Bell was one of the first engineers appointed to the new Service. In 1870 he was part of the survey team for new railways in the Chanda and Wardha valleys. There followed a succession of surveying commissions through the rest of the 1870s, including the Indore State Railway (1870), the Punjab Northern State Railway (opened 1874), the Rajputana-Malwa Railway (1875), the Sindia State Railway (1876) and the Rutlam Neemuch Nusserabad Railway (1878). He took an extended break in England between April 1873 and December 1874: it was during the summer of 1874 that he married Marcia Napier Ogilvy at Wandsworth (south London). The marriage produced nine recorded children, although five of these would predecease their father.

Another stint in England took place between July 1880 and November 1881. During this time he is listed as a tutor of students on the "practical course" at the Royal Indian Engineering College near Egham, to the south-west of London. Professional advancement continued through and beyond the 1880s. In January 1880 Bell became a superintending engineer third class, and following successive further promotions, in January 1892 he became a chief engineer third class.

Between 1881 and 1884, as Engineer in Chief of the Dacca Mymensingh State Railway, he was in charge of a succession of surveys for the important Narayanganj–Bahadurabad Ghat line which would be completed later in the decade. Further appointments of a similar nature followed in rapid succession. For much of the four-year period till March 1888 he was employed with the Tirhoot State Railway, receiving particular commendation from the authorities in connection with the Gunduck Bridge, constructed as part of the new line in 1887. During this time he also served, briefly, as acting director in charge of the North-Western Railway.

In August 1890 he moved to Calcutta, taking a position in August 1892 with the colonial government as a consulting engineer for state railways. He retained this position till his retirement in June 1894. However, there was an interruption between January and April 1893 during which he was instead employed, briefly, as the acting Director General of Railways in India.

=== Active retirement ===
Following his retirement Horace Bell returned to England, while remaining in close touch with railway construction in India. Companies retaining his services on a consultancy basis included the Southern Punjab Railway and the Nilgiri mountain rack railway, although he died by the time the latter railway had been completed. Closer to home, he provided consultancy services in respect of the Marconi radio masts ("wireless station") erected at Poldhu on the extreme south-west of England.

Bell had been a full member of the London-based Institution of Civil Engineers since 1872, and in 1897 he was elected to its council, remaining a council member for six years.

=== Death ===
Through most of his life Horace Bell enjoyed robust good health, but an influenza attack in 1902 mutated into heart disease. He died in west London on 10 April 1903.

== The writer ==
Horace Bell produced a number of pamphlets and articles on railway policy. His book, "Railway Policy in India", was published in 1894. Possibly more unexpected were his primers on basic economics, "The Laws of Wealth" (first published 1883) and on government "The Government of India: a Primer" (3rd edition, 1893), both of which were subsequently used as teaching material in Indian state schools.
