= The Trinity Six =

British spy novel

- First edition (UK)
- Author: Charles Cumming
- Language: English
- Genre: Thriller novel
- Publisher: HarperCollins (UK); St Martin's Press (US)
- Publication date: 2011
- Publication place: Great Britain
- Media type: Print (Hardcover & Paperback)
- Pages: 368 pp
- ISBN: 9780312675295
- OCLC: 651912956

The Trinity Six is a 2011 thriller novel by Charles Cumming.

== Plot summary ==
Sam Gaddis is a history professor at University College London. His friend Charlotte Berg tells him she is writing a book about the "Sixth Man", a sixth member of the Cambridge Five Russian spy ring. However, Charlotte dies of a heart attack the next day. Unbeknownst to Gaddis, she was murdered by a Russian agent using sodium fluoracetate.

Gaddis decides to finish her book, in order to pay off his debts. His lover Holly Levette gives him her mother Katya's files, who was researching a book about the KGB.

Gaddis contacts an elderly man called Thomas Neame, who knew the sixth man Edward Crane. He discovers that Crane was really a double agent who worked for the British, and Crane's death was faked by MI6 to protect him, on the instructions of John Brennan, who later became the head of MI6. Gaddis later discovers that Neame is Crane.

The medical staff who helped fake Crane's death are murdered by the Russians. Sir John instructs a female agent Tanya Acocella to discourage Gaddis from pursuing the case. Gaddis travels to Vienna to meet Robert Wilkinson, Crane's former handler. Wilkinson reveals that Sergei Platov, the Russian president and former KGB agent, tried to defect to the West in 1988. Wilkinson is murdered by the Russians after Brennan informs them of his location. Tanya helps extract Gaddis from Vienna.

Gaddis finds a video of Platov's defection attempt in Katya Levette's files, and makes several copies. The Russians discover his identity, but he is able to prevent them from harming him or his family by threatening to publish the video. It turns out that MI6 have been using Platov's secret to blackmail him for years.

== Reception ==
A strongly positive review in The Washington Post described it as "a sophisticated thriller that takes its spies at face value and focuses on a conventional hero, a likable, stubborn and rather naive man, who is trying to survive in a world of duplicity and danger." The Washington Post named it one of their notable books of the year for 2011, comparing it to Alan Furst and John le Carré.

A review in The New York Times described it as "a lively thriller", however wrote that "the narrative thread slackens somewhat as Cumming piles improbability upon improbability."

Kirkus Reviews described it as "characterized by a gripping sense of realism", displaying "a vast knowledge of spycraft and Cold War history". Kirkus Reviews later listed it as one of the best thrillers of 2011.

The Independent described it as "splendidly written". The book was reviewed in The Guardian, and also in The Spectator.

The book was longlisted for the 2011 CWA Ian Fleming Steel Dagger award.

The book was optioned in 2011 by Universal Studios.
