= Jackal (The Day of the Jackal) =

Fictional character, introduced in 1971

The Jackal
- The Day of the Jackal character
- The Jackal (Edward Fox) practising with his newly customised sniper rifle.
- Created by: Frederick Forsyth
- Portrayed by: Edward Fox (The Day of the Jackal); Bruce Willis (The Jackal); Eddie Redmayne (The Day of the Jackal)

In-universe information
- Aliases: Alexander James Quentin Duggan; Per Jensen; Marty Schulberg; Andre Martin; Charles Calthrop
- Nicknames: Jackal, or Chacal 'The Englishman'
- Occupation: Assassin

The Jackal is a fictional character, the principal antagonist of the novel The Day of the Jackal by Frederick Forsyth. He is an English assassin who is contracted by the OAS French terrorist group of the early 1960s to kill Charles de Gaulle, then president of France. The book was published on 7 June 1971, in the year following de Gaulle's death, and became an instant bestseller. In the 1973 original film adaptation, he is portrayed by Edward Fox. In the 2024 TV series, a contemporary interpretation of the Jackal in the modern era is portrayed by Eddie Redmayne.

A significantly altered version of the character was portrayed by Bruce Willis in the 1997 loosely based adaptation, having a divergent storyline and set in the U.S., with a fictional first lady of the United States as the target of the assassination.

== Biographical summary ==
=== Main novel plot ===
As the story opens, the Jackal plans to continue working as an assassin until he can afford to retire. The money paid to him for assassinating two German engineers, thus delaying the development of Gamal Abdel Nasser's Al Zarifa rocket (Operation Damocles), had been enough to keep him in luxury for several years, but the offer of US$500,000 (about 5 million in 2024 dollars) from the OAS to kill de Gaulle gives him the opportunity to retire early. Despite his concern over the "security slackness of the OAS", he finds the job too tempting to turn down. However, he insists that the OAS commanders in charge of the plot must not disclose the matter to anybody, and suggests they stay somewhere under heavy guard until the assassination is complete.

The assassin invents the codename of "the Jackal" after he is hired by the OAS conspirators. When asked for his choice of codename in the novel, the Jackal replies: "Since we have been speaking of hunting, what about the Jackal? Will that do?".

Taking elaborate precautions, the Jackal applies for a passport (based on an infant whose birthday is very close to his own but who died at a young age) and seeks out forged identity documents to sneak into France. He also steals two passports as contingent identities and purchases disguises to match. He kills the forger, after he attempts to blackmail him for more money, and commissions a specially made sniper rifle from an expert gunsmith. He later goes to France to reconnoitre the best location and does research about de Gaulle, before concluding that the best time to kill him is on 25 August 1963.

The French Action Service is able to capture and interrogate Kowalski (Wolenski in the film), a bodyguard to Marc Rodin (the overall chief of the OAS) and one of the few men who has knowledge of the assassination, if not the actual details. Through Kowalski, the Action Service learns of the plot as well the Jackal's code name and a rough description. Roger Frey, the Minister of the Interior of France, convenes a meeting of all the heads of the department of state security, but all the men are at a loss as to how to proceed, until a Commissioner of the Police Judiciare suggests that the first and most important objective is to establish the true identity of the Jackal, which is something that only pure detective work can accomplish. When the Minister of the Interior asks him for the best detective in France, he volunteers his own deputy, Claude Lebel.

Using OAS agent "Valmy" as a cut-out, the Jackal is kept fully informed of the French police's pursuit of him. Meanwhile, Lebel relies on his old boy network of police departments in several foreign countries to instigate a search for the Jackal. The Special Branch of England investigate and finds out there was a man named Charles Calthrop who was rumoured to have killed Rafael Trujillo some years ago using a precision sniper rifle. They find six men named 'Charles Calthrop', with one individual in particular raising some suspicion when it is discovered he has gone on holiday, leaving his passport in his house. This passport, together with the fact that Jackal in French is 'Chacal' (the first three letters of his first name and last name respectively), causes the English to assume that this specific Charles Calthrop is the assassin.

On two occasions when the police get too close, the Jackal hides out in the home of a stranger he has seduced; once with a wealthy noblewoman he meets in a hotel and again with a gay man he meets in a bar. He kills the former when she finds the components of his weapon, and the latter after the man watches a news report displaying the Jackal's photograph and describing him as a fugitive murderer.

Finally, on Liberation Day itself, the Jackal poses as a handicapped veteran and tries to shoot de Gaulle with his rifle, which he had hidden inside a stainless steel crutch. However, de Gaulle unexpectedly moves his head at the last moment, causing the Jackal to miss by a fraction of an inch. As the Jackal prepares for a second shot, he is discovered by French police detective Lebel, who has been pursuing him since the plot was discovered. He uses his second shot to kill a CRS trooper who accompanied Lebel to the room, but the unarmed Claude shoots and kills him with the trooper's MAT-49 before the Jackal can load his third and last bullet. The Jackal is buried two days later in an unmarked grave; only Lebel attends, anonymously. The death certificate identifies him as "an unknown foreign tourist, killed in a car accident".

In the epilogue, Charles Calthrop arrives home from vacation to find British police raiding his flat. He demands to know what is happening and is brought to the police post for interrogation. It is subsequently established that Calthrop was, indeed, on a holiday and that he is completely unconnected to the killer. Both the film and the novel end with the same comment by British authorities: "If the Jackal wasn't Calthrop, then who the hell was he?"

=== Appearance ===
The Jackal is described as a tall, blond Englishman in his early thirties living in Mayfair, London. The character's real name is unknown and details of his background are sketchy. Forsyth explains in the novel, "Alexander Duggan who died at the age of two and a half years in 1931 ... would have been a few months older than the Jackal in July 1963", which means that the Jackal was born around 1929-1930. He is described by Forsyth as six feet tall, with a slender yet muscular build and few distinguishing features, one of which is his cold grey eyes. In the novel, it is stated he likes to wear striped shirts, knitted ties, and wraparound sunglasses. During the course of the novel he frequently changes the colour of his hair and hides his distinctive eyes behind a variety of tinted contact lenses.

=== Abilities and skills ===
The Jackal uses a numbered Swiss bank account to hold the proceeds of his work. He is a careful, sophisticated and meticulous killer who plans every detail of each assassination well in advance. He has multiple successful contracts, but no record or file on any European police force whatsoever. During the course of the novel he contacts a Congo mercenary called Louis, whom he met in Katanga (that means the Jackal was probably a mercenary during the Congo Crisis for some time), who puts the Jackal in touch with a skilled armourer who fabricates the assassin's rifle and a forger who provides false identification papers. According to his abilities, high professionalism, fluency in French and the absence of his data in the British archives, the Jackal was trained as a sniper in the French Foreign Legion and has combat experience (most likely during First Indochina War and Algerian War). In order to get a false identification paper, the Jackal gives his own driver's license to the forger with the claim that the card belongs to a dead man; when the forger tries to coax more money from the Englishman, the Jackal kills him.

The Jackal speaks fluent French and is sufficiently skilled in hand-to-hand combat that he can kill with his bare hands. He has managed to remain anonymous except to those select few who recommend him for an assignment. He considers his anonymity his main weapon and prefers to carry out missions alone.

In the novel, the international police forces hunting him speculate that he may have helped assassinate Rafael Leónidas Trujillo in the Dominican Republic by shooting the driver of his armoured car, causing it to crash into the trap in which Trujillo was, in fact, killed. The 1973 film version tells not only was he involved in Trujillo's death but also killed a V.I.P. identified only as "that fellow from the Congo" (implicitly Patrice Lumumba, whose murder in the novel was committed by another assassin considered by the OAS).

Before he is approached by the OAS, the Jackal's only known confirmed kills are of two German rocket scientists in Egypt, who were helping Gamal Abdel Nasser build rockets to attack Israel. He performed this task at close range using a small-calibre weapon, a crime that left the Egyptian government furious and baffled. The Jackal was paid by a Zionist millionaire in New York, who considered his money "well spent". Although he resides in an expensive section of London (Mayfair) the Jackal is clever enough to realize that regardless of whether or not the OAS can capture France that De Gaulle's partisans will not stop until they have tracked him down and killed him; thus he plans to retire as a millionaire to Lebanon.

=== Identities ===
The Jackal's true name always remains a mystery: it is never discovered by the authorities or revealed to the reader, despite the police force apprehending various characters who have a similar name. He uses the following identities in the course of the novel:

- Alexander James Quentin "Alex" Duggan: This is a boy who was born in the same year that the Jackal was born, but died aged two and a half in a car accident. The Jackal obtains Duggan's birth certificate under false pretences and applies for a passport in this name but with his own photograph and details.
- Ahmed Nizam: A pastor from Copenhagen who bears a reasonable resemblance to the Jackal, but is older with iron grey hair and gold-rimmed reading glasses. The Jackal steals Pastor Nizam's passport from his London hotel room and adopts the disguise after his cover as Duggan is blown by both the French police and a woman he seduces and hides out with, who finds the components of his weapon.
- Martin "Marty" Schulberg: A student from Syracuse University who also somewhat resembles the Jackal, but is younger with chestnut brown hair and heavy-rimmed executive spectacles. The Jackal steals Schulberg's hand luggage containing his passport from London airport and adopts the disguise when he realises the police must be on to Jensen, enhancing his cover to avoid them by using lipstick, mascara, and eyeshadow to help him pose as a flamboyant homosexual.
- André Martin: A fictitious French war veteran from Alsace-Lorraine, Martin is in his 50s and has only one leg, necessitating walking around with a stainless steel crutch. This particular identity is central to the assassination plot. The Jackal becomes Martin — complete with French identity card and war wounded identity courtesy of a Belgian forger — by dyeing his hair grey and cutting it badly, swallowing a couple of pieces of cordite to make himself sick and take on a pale complexion, and folding his leg back and binding it with a webbing strap to mimic an amputated leg, with the crutch being used to conceal the Jackal's custom-made sniper rifle and ammunition.
- Charles Calthrop: Charles Calthrop is the name of a former small-arms salesman who was in the Dominican Republic at the time Rafael Leónidas Trujillo was shot. When Lebel uses his old boy network contacts to instigate a manhunt, he contacts Special Branch, and a member of SB later contacts the SIS. The Secret Intelligence Service, in turn, uncover a rumour that Calthrop has helped the partisans kill Trujillo by shooting the driver of his armoured car, causing it to crash and allowing his assassins to finish him off. The British police in the book surmise that Calthrop is the Jackal's real name, until the real Calthrop shows up at the end, after the Jackal has been killed. The authorities were misled by the fact that chacal (i.e., Cha[rles] Cal[throp]) is French for "jackal". Police investigations show that the real Charles Calthrop went on a holiday with what looked like fishing rods in his car, which cause them to jump to the conclusion that he was armed with weapons. When the Jackal learns the French are looking for a Charles Calthrop, he does not react with any apparent concern (as might be the case if it were his real name).

== In other media ==
=== 1973 film ===
In the 1973 adaptation of the novel, the Jackal is portrayed by Edward Fox. Some of the Jackal's background details are clarified: the dossier the OAS read from states that the Jackal killed Trujillo and the "fellow in the Congo" (presumably Dag Hammarskjöld or Patrice Lumumba). Within the film, his alias names vary slightly from the ones he uses in the novel.

=== 1997 film ===
In the 1997 remake of the original film, the Jackal is portrayed by Bruce Willis. This version of the character differs significantly from both the original novel and the earlier film. He is depicted as an American assassin and former Special Forces operative with combat experience in El Salvador. Once a KGB asset, he is hired by an Azerbaijani mobster to assassinate the First Lady of the United States in revenge for the death of the mobster’s brother during a joint FBI–MVD raid. The Jackal is characterized as a sociopath who takes pleasure in killing. Survivors of encounters with him describe him as emotionless and cold: “This man was ice. No feeling. Nothing.”

He is pursued by agents of the FBI and the MVD, along with Declan Mulqueen, a former Irish Republican Army sharpshooter seeking revenge after the Jackal shot his former lover, Isabella Zancona, causing her to miscarry their child. In the end, Mulqueen thwarts the assassination and saves the First Lady’s life, and he and Zancona together gun down the Jackal. As in the novel and the original film, the Jackal’s real name is never revealed to either the investigators or the audience.

=== 2024 TV series ===
In the 2024 series, the Jackal is portrayed by Eddie Redmayne. In the updated plot, he is a former British Army sniper named Alexander James Gordon Duggan. Initially entering the Royal Military Academy Sandhurst as an officer cadet, he leaves and joins the Parachute Regiment as a Private, training at Pirbright and later taking the sniper commander course at Warminster. He was assigned to the Pathfinder Platoon as their top sniper, and deployed to Northern Ireland, Norway, Kosovo, Sierra Leone and Iraq. He was later assigned to a United Kingdom Special Forces group that carried out a series of covert operations under STRAP 2 clearance assassinating high level Taliban targets in Afghanistan. He is introduced to the concept of well paid contract killing whilst on R&R in Cyprus. After witnessing his team commit a war crime, he activates an IED that kills all of them apart from his trusted spotter in Helmand Province in 2013. Presumed dead, he takes up employment as an assassin full time. He takes his codename after the name of one of the two vehicles in his previous covert unit, with the other being named "Phantom".

The Jackal is introduced as being hired by German publisher Elias Fest to assassinate his father Manfred Fest, a far-right businessman politician and candidate for Chancellor of Germany. After injuring Elias in Munich, the Jackal succeeds in killing Manfred with a record sniper shot when he visits his son in hospital. After not receiving his fee, the Jackal also kills Elias.

He is then hired by wealthy financier Timothy Winthrop to assassinate billionaire tech mogul and activist Ulle Dag Charles, who plans to release a piece of software called ‘River’ which will assist in exposing the locations of dark money across the globe. In the aftermath of killing Fest (a friend of the Foreign Secretary) and as he plans the new assassination, the Jackal finds himself pursued by a team from the fictitious MI6 Section 303, led by agent and firearms expert Bianca Pullman.

Like in the original, the Jackal uses a variety of aliases and disguises when carrying out his work:

- Charles Calthrop - His main alternative identity. Under this name he resides in Cádiz, Spain, and is married to a woman named Nuria with whom he has a young son, Carlito. When challenged by his wife about his secretive work he initially tells her he is a troubleshooter who is hired by the wealthy to conduct corporate espionage.
- Ralf Becker - A middle aged German janitor at Fest Unternehmen in Munich. He kills and adopts the identity of the real Ralf Becker using prosthetics, and is able to enter the building and wound Elias Fest. When his father, Manfred Fest, visits his son at hospital, the Jackal is able to kill him with a sniper shot.
- Alistair Thirsk - A bald British citizen from London, which he uses to initially meet with Zina Jansome, a representative of Winthrop. It is also the identity one of the Jackal's Cayman Islands bank accounts is registered under.
- Josef Bauer - A mild mannered, disabled German man from Munich who lived with his recently deceased mother and suffers from migraines. He uses this identity to access the database of the funeral director responsible for the funeral of Manfred Fest.
- Stefan Wolf - A German funeral service chauffeur who resembles the Jackal without prosthetics. He kills Wolf and briefly adopts his identity to kidnap and ultimately assassinate Elias Fest after he refuses to pay his fee.
- Anthony Mallinson - A British-French antique collector born in Birmingham and living in Paris. He uses this identity as an alibi for why he was in Germany (purchasing an antique chess set in Nuremberg) when crossing the border back to France. Using this alias he is involved in a car accident in France, and is forced to kill a delivery driver and Municipal Police officer to escape.
- Forsyth Frederick McCarthy - An older British man originally from Oxford. The Jackal uses this identity to fly from Budapest back to Tallinn whilst avoiding detection from law enforcement, transporting a custom rifle within an orthopedic boot. The name is a reference to the author of the original novel.
- Peter Gibson - A British architectural engineer. He uses this cover to have an interest in the concert hall in Tallinn where Ulle Dag Charles is due to announce River. Under this name he seduces Rasmus, a security guard at the hall, to gain access to exclusive areas.

== "Carlos the Jackal" ==
Real-life terrorist Ilich Ramírez Sánchez, already known under the code name "Carlos", had his nickname expanded to "Carlos the Jackal" after a copy of The Day of the Jackal belonging to a friend was found in his hiding place.
