= Charles Cumming =

British writer

- Born: 1971 (age 54–55); Ayr, Scotland
- Education: Eton College; University of Edinburgh
- Occupations: Novelist and Screenwriter
- Spouse: Harriette Peel
- Children: 4
- Website: www.charlescumming.co.uk

Charles Cumming (born 1971) is a British writer of spy fiction and a screenwriter.

== Early life and education ==
Cumming was born in 1971, in Ayr, Scotland, the son of Ian Cumming (b. 1938) and Caroline Pilkington (b. 1943).

He was educated at Ludgrove School (1979–1984), Eton College (1985–1989) and the University of Edinburgh (1990–1994), where he earned a first class honours degree in English Literature.

In 1995, Cumming was approached for recruitment by the United Kingdom's Secret Intelligence Service (MI6) but did not go on to work for them.

== Career ==
Cumming's first novel, A Spy by Nature, was published in the UK in June 2001. The novel's hero, Alec Milius, is a flawed loner in his early 20s who is instructed by MI5 to sell doctored research data on oil exploration in the Caspian Sea to the Central Intelligence Agency (CIA).

In August 2001, Cumming moved to Madrid. His second novel, The Hidden Man (2003), tells the story of two brothers investigating the murder of their father, a former SIS officer, at the hands of the Russian mafia. The Hidden Man also examines the clandestine role played by SIS and the CIA during the Soviet–Afghan War.

His third novel, The Spanish Game (2006), marks the return of anti-hero Alec Milius, who becomes involved in a plot by the paramilitary Basque nationalist organization ETA to bring down the Spanish government. The Spanish Game was described by The Times as one of the six finest spy novels of all time, alongside Tinker Tailor Soldier Spy, Funeral in Berlin and The Scarlet Pimpernel.

Typhoon, published in the UK in 2008, is a political thriller about a CIA plot to destabilise China on the eve of the Beijing Olympics. The story spans the decade from the transfer of sovereignty over Hong Kong in 1997 to present-day Shanghai. In particular, the author highlights the plight of the Uyghur Muslim population in Xinjiang, a semi-autonomous region of China. The novelist William Boyd described Typhoon as "a wholly compelling and sophisticated spy novel – vivid and disturbing – immaculately researched and full of harrowing contemporary relevance." Typhoon was listed by The New York Times as one of the 100 Notable Books of 2009.

Cumming's fifth novel, The Trinity Six, a thriller about the discovery of a sixth member of the Cambridge spies ring, was published in 2011. The Washington Post named The Trinity Six as one of the Notable Books of 2011.

A Foreign Country, his sixth novel, concerning the disappearance of the first female Chief of MI6, was published in 2012. It is the first in a trilogy of novels about disgraced MI6 officer Thomas Kell. A Foreign Country was named the first Scottish Crime Book of the Year at the inaugural Bloody Scotland Festival in Stirling in September 2012. It won the CWA Ian Fleming Steel Dagger for the best thriller of 2012.

A sequel, entitled A Colder War, in which Kell investigates a traitor inside western intelligence, was published in 2014. The novel won the CrimeFest eDunnit Award for Best Crime eBook of the Year. The third novel in the Thomas Kell series, A Divided Spy, was published in 2016.

Cumming's ninth novel, The Man Between, was published in 2018. Released in the United States as The Moroccan Girl, it tells the story of a writer who agrees to spy for MI6 while attending a literary festival in Morocco.

In 2020 Cumming published BOX 88, a thriller set in both the present day and in 1989. The protagonist, Lachlan Kite, is recruited into a top secret UK and US intelligence network while attending Alford, a fictional public school modelled on Eton College. A sequel, JUDAS 62 was published in the UK in 2021. Now a university student, Kite is sent to the Russian city of Voronezh in 1993 to extract a chemical weapons scientist. In the present day he mounts an operation against the FSB in Dubai. The third novel in the Lachlan Kite series, KENNEDY 35, was published in 2023. Kite travels to Senegal in 1995 to capture a Hutu war criminal, an operation which has ramifications for Europe in the present day. The fourth novel in the series, ICARUS 17 was published in 2026.

Cumming's novels have been translated into fourteen languages. His work is published in the United Kingdom by HarperCollins, in the United States by Mysterious Press and in Spain by Salamandra.

In 2015, Cumming sold an original screenplay, The Plane, to DiBonaventura Pictures. The film was released by Lionsgate as Plane in 2023 starring Gerard Butler and Mike Colter. It was directed by Jean-François Richet. Cumming was also part of the writing team assembled by Ronan Bennett for The Day of The Jackal.

Cumming was also an assistant editor of The Week from 1996 to 2013.

== Personal life ==
Cumming lives in west London. He is married and has four children.

He is one of the trustees of The Pierce Loughran Memorial Scholarship fund, which provides tuition fees for the Yeats Summer School in Sligo, Ireland. He is also the founder and President of the José Raúl Capablanca Memorial Chess Society.

== Bibliography ==
- A Spy by Nature (2001), ISBN 0-14-029476-7, the first Alec Milius novel
- The Hidden Man (2003), ISBN 0-14-029477-5
- The Spanish Game (2006), ISBN 0-14-101783-X, the second Alec Milius novel
- Typhoon (2008), ISBN 0-14-101802-X
- The Trinity Six (2010), ISBN 0-312-67529-1
- A Foreign Country (2012), ISBN 0-00-733783-3, the first Thomas Kell novel
- A Colder War (2014), ISBN 0-00-746747-8, the second Thomas Kell novel
- A Divided Spy (2016), ISBN 0-00-746751-6, the third Thomas Kell novel
- The Man Between (2018), ISBN 0-00-820031-9, published in the US as The Moroccan Girl (2019)
- BOX 88 (2020), ISBN 978-0-00-820036-7
- JUDAS 62 (2021), ISBN 978-0-00-836346-8
- KENNEDY 35 (2023) ISBN 978-0-00-836352-9
- ICARUS 17 (2026) ISBN 978-0008696337
