= The Jackal (1997 film) =

1997 American action film by Michael Caton-Jones

- Theatrical release poster
- Directed by: Michael Caton-Jones
- Written by: Chuck Pfarrer
- Based on: The Day of the Jackal (1973 film) by Kenneth Ross; The Day of the Jackal (1971 novel) by Frederick Forsyth (uncredited)
- Produced by: James Jacks; Sean Daniel; Michael Caton-Jones; Kevin Jarre
- Starring: Bruce Willis; Richard Gere; Sidney Poitier; Diane Venora
- Cinematography: Karl Walter Lindenlaub
- Edited by: Jim Clark
- Music by: Carter Burwell
- Production companies: Mutual Film Company; Alphaville Films
- Distributed by: Universal Pictures
- Release date: November 14, 1997
- Running time: 124 minutes
- Country: United States
- Languages: English; Russian
- Budget: $60 million
- Box office: $159.3 million

The Jackal is a 1997 American action thriller film directed by Michael Caton-Jones. It is a loose remake of the 1973 film The Day of the Jackal, which was in turn based on the 1971 novel by Frederick Forsyth. The film stars Bruce Willis, Richard Gere, Diane Venora and Sidney Poitier in his final theatrically released film role.

A professional assassin known only by his codename "Jackal" (Willis) is hired to assassinate a high-level American VIP. The FBI recruits an imprisoned Provisional IRA member (Gere) to catch him. The film is the second overall adaptation of Forsyth's novel, followed by a 2024 television series.

The Jackal was released in the United States by Universal Pictures on November 14, 1997. It received mostly negative reviews from critics but was a commercial success, grossing $159.3 million worldwide against a $60 million budget.

== Plot ==
A joint operation between the FBI and the MVD in Moscow leads to the demise of the younger brother of Azerbaijani mafia kingpin Terek Murad. Intending to retaliate, Murad hires an ex-KGB asset, an international hitman operating under the codename "The Jackal", to assassinate an unidentified prominent American for $70 million. Two weeks later, the MVD capture and interrogate one of Murad's henchmen, Viktor Politovsky, and discover the assassination plot. The interrogation, coupled with recovered documents, leads the FBI and MVD to suspect that FBI Director Donald Brown is the intended target.

Possessing a series of disguises and stolen or forged IDs, the Jackal prepares for the assassination attempt. FBI Deputy Director Carter Preston and Russian Police Major Valentina Koslova turn to imprisoned Provisional IRA sniper Declan Mulqueen for help. They believe that his former lover, an ETA militant and fugitive named Isabella Zancona, can identify the Jackal. Mulqueen reveals that he is acquainted with the Jackal and agrees to help in exchange for his release and safe haven for Zancona. Mulqueen and Zancona want revenge on the Jackal after he wounded her in Libya, causing her to miscarry their unborn child. Zancona, now married, provides information to help identify the Jackal, and discreetly slips Mulqueen a key to a dropbox containing a clean passport and $10,000 cash to return to Ireland.

Meanwhile, when the Jackal arrives in Montreal to collect a large caliber weapon, a contact notifies him that hijackers are pursuing it. The Jackal kills one hijacker with a poisonous chemical and evades the others. He then hires gunsmith Ian Lamont to build a control mount for the weapon. When Lamont tries extorting more money, the Jackal kills him during a live-fire test of the weapon.

The Jackal sails across the Great Lakes to Chicago, where he evades the FBI and almost kills Mulqueen. Koslova discovers that the director of the Russian Embassy in Washington, D.C., gave the Jackal a direct access code to FBI records; the Jackal later uses this information to kill Koslova and two FBI agents. Before dying, Koslova – passing on a taunt from the Jackal – tells Mulqueen that "[Declan] cannot protect his women".

As the Jackal drives to Washington, D.C., Mulqueen deduces from the Jackal's mocking statement that his target is the First Lady of the United States, who is scheduled to give a speech. The Jackal, masquerading as a gay man, dates Douglas, a man he encountered earlier in a bar; unbeknownst to Douglas, he uses his garage to store his weapon. When a news report exposes the Jackal's identity, he kills Douglas.

On the date of the First Lady's speech, the weapon is concealed in a minivan parked near the speaker podium, with the Jackal planning to shoot the First Lady via remote control. However, before the Jackal can take his shot, Mulqueen uses a marksman's rifle to destroy the weapon's scope and takes off in pursuit of the Jackal, while the sniper accompanying Mulqueen blows up the van's fuel tank. The Jackal opens fire before his vehicle is destroyed, wounding Preston as the latter tackles the First Lady to safety. Following a chase through the Washington Metro tunnels, Mulqueen confronts the Jackal, who takes a hostage. The Jackal lets the hostage go after Mulqueen surrenders his weapon, and prepares to kill him, but Zancona shoots him in the neck before he can fire. While Zancona tends to Mulqueen, the Jackal, though severely wounded, tries to retrieve a spare weapon. Mulqueen grabs Zancona's pistol and shoots the Jackal several times, killing him.

A few days later, Preston and Mulqueen witness the Jackal's burial in an unmarked grave. Preston reveals that he is returning to Russia to pursue Terek Murad, and that Mulqueen's request to be released was denied but he will likely be moved to a minimum security prison. Preston also remarks that his heroics in saving the First Lady have made him "untouchable" within the FBI, and turns his back on Mulqueen, allowing him to go free.

== Cast ==
- Bruce Willis as The Jackal
- Richard Gere as Declan Mulqueen
- Sidney Poitier as FBI Deputy Director Carter Preston
- Diane Venora as MVD Major Valentina Koslova
- Mathilda May as Isabella Zancona
- J. K. Simmons as FBI Agent Timothy I. Witherspoon
- Richard Lineback as FBI Agent McMurphy
- John Cunningham as FBI Director Donald Brown
- Jack Black as Ian Lamont
- Tess Harper as First Lady Emily Cowan
- Leslie Phillips as Woolburton
- Stephen Spinella as Douglas
- David Hayman as Terek Murad
- Ravil Isyanov as Ghazzi Murad
- Steve Bassett as George Decker
- Yuri Stepanov as Viktor Politovsky
- Walt MacPherson as Dennehey
- Maggie Castle as Maggie
- Daniel Dae Kim as Akashi
- Peter Sullivan as Vasilov
- Richard Cubison as General Belinko
- Serge Houde as RCMP Agent Beaufres
- Jonathan Aris as Aleksander Radzinski
- Edward Fine as Bill Smith
- Sophie Okonedo as Document forger
- Murphy Guyer as NSC representative
- Larry King as himself

== Production ==
=== Development and writing ===
The film began production titled The Day of the Jackal, but the author of the original novel Frederick Forsyth and the director and producer of the original film Fred Zinnemann and John Woolf opposed the production. They eventually filed an injunction to prevent Universal Pictures from using the name of the original novel and film, and it would be marketed as being "inspired by" rather than directly based on Forsyth's novel, only crediting Kenneth Ross' 1973 screenplay. Edward Fox also reportedly turned down a cameo appearance in the film.

Chuck Pfarrer had written the first script. He was finishing up a three-year deal at Universal when he was offered the project. Pfarrer initially said no, but he agreed to write the script to fulfill contractual obligations to the studio, then Kevin Jarre did a rewrite to Pfarrer's script, contributing the Richard Gere character, Declan Mulqueen, an imprisoned IRA terrorist who strikes up a bargain to assist the FBI. Caton-Jones later said in an interview with The Washington Post that he regretted not being there to supervise and contribute more to the screenplay:

"I never really liked the script. It was always too long, So I was trying to trim it as I went along and I really made the film in the editing room, stripping a lot of excess away".

=== Filming ===
Principal photography lasted from August 19 to November 30, 1996. Filming took place across various international locations in Chicago; Colleton County, South Carolina; Helsinki & Porvoo, Finland; London; Montreal; Moscow; Richmond, Virginia; Washington, D.C.; and Wilmington, North Carolina.

The climatic chase scene was filmed in the Montreal Metro (doubling for the Washington Metro). Studio interiors were filmed at Carolco Pictures Studios in Wilmington (now Cinespace Wilmington) and Pinewood Studios in England.

=== Editing ===
An early test-screened version of the film had an innocent man shot by Willis' character hiding out in a gay bar. The audience loudly cheered the killing, which came to the attention of GLAAD. Chaz Bono (the group's entertainment media director) spoke with Jackal producer Sean Daniel, who arranged to have the scene re-edited. Willis successfully fought to keep a same-sex kiss in the film.

== Release ==
=== Home media ===
The Jackal was released on VHS, DVD and LaserDisc on April 28, 1998. A Blu-Ray was released in 2010.

== Reception ==
=== Critical response ===
The Jackal received a 24% rating on Rotten Tomatoes based on 33 reviews, with an average rating of 4.6/10. The website's critical consensus reads, "The Jackal is a relatively simple chase thriller incapable of adding thrills or excitement as the plot chugs along." Metacritic gave the film a score of 36 out of 100 based on 20 reviews. Audiences polled by CinemaScore gave the film an average grade of "B−" on an A+ to F scale.

Roger Ebert of the Chicago Sun-Times called it a "glum, curiously flat thriller"; he also included the film in his "Worst of 1997", comparing it to the 1973 film and calling it a "retread", "cruder", and "dumbed down". Ruthe Stein of the San Francisco Chronicle called it "more preposterous than thrilling"; and Russell Smith of the Austin Chronicle called it "1997's most tedious movie".

At the 1997 Stinkers Bad Movie Awards, Richard Gere received a nomination for Worst Fake Accent, but he lost to Jon Voight for Anaconda and Most Wanted.

=== Box office ===
The Jackal was released on November 14, 1997, with an opening weekend totaling $15,164,595. It went on to gross $159,330,280 worldwide, against a $60 million budget.

== Music ==
The original score for The Jackal was composed by Carter Burwell. It was never officially released on CD, although Burwell uploaded select cues from the film to his website. The project was not a happy experience for Burwell; he disliked the script, and disapproved of producer Danny Saber's remix of his score.

== See also ==
- The Assignment (1997 film)
