= The Day of the Jackal (film) =

1973 thriller film directed by Fred Zinnemann

- Theatrical release poster
- Directed by: Fred Zinnemann
- Screenplay by: Kenneth Ross
- Based on: The Day of the Jackal (1971 novel) by Frederick Forsyth
- Produced by: John Woolf
- Starring: Edward Fox; Alan Badel; Tony Britton; Cyril Cusack; Derek Jacobi; Michael Lonsdale; Eric Porter; Delphine Seyrig
- Cinematography: Jean Tournier
- Edited by: Ralph Kemplen
- Music by: Georges Delerue
- Production companies: Warwick Film Productions; Universal Productions France
- Distributed by: Universal Pictures
- Release dates: 16 May 1973 (New York premiere); 14 June 1973 (U.K.); 14 September 1973 (France)
- Running time: 142 minutes
- Countries: United Kingdom; France
- Language: English
- Box office: $16,056,255

The Day of the Jackal is a 1973 political thriller film directed by Fred Zinnemann and starring Edward Fox and Michael Lonsdale. Based on the 1971 novel by Frederick Forsyth, the film is about a professional assassin known only as the "Jackal" who is hired to assassinate French president Charles de Gaulle in the summer of 1963. It stars Edward Fox as the title character, with Michael Lonsdale, Derek Jacobi, Terence Alexander, Michel Auclair, Alan Badel, Donald Sinden, Tony Britton, Cyril Cusack, Maurice Denham and Delphine Seyrig. The musical score was composed by Georges Delerue.

A co-production of the United Kingdom and France, The Day of the Jackal received positive reviews and went on to win the BAFTA Award for Best Editing (Ralph Kemplen), five additional nominations (including Best Film and Best Direction), two Golden Globe Award nominations, and one Oscar nomination. The film grossed $16,056,255 at the North American box office, returning $8,525,000 in rentals to the studio. In 1999, the British Film Institute ranked it the 74th greatest British film of the 20th century.

A remake of the film was released in 1997. A TV adaptation of the novel and film aired on Sky Atlantic in 2024.

== Plot ==
"August, 1962 was a stormy time for France. Many people felt that President Charles de Gaulle had betrayed the country by giving independence to Algeria. Extremists, mostly from the army, swore to kill him in revenge. They banded together in an underground movement and called themselves the OAS."

— Opening narration

The far-right Organisation armée secrète ("Secret Army Organisation") plots to assassinate President de Gaulle. The first attempt on 22 August fails, leaving de Gaulle and his entourage unharmed. Within six months, OAS leader Jean Bastien-Thiry and several members are captured, and Bastien-Thiry is executed. The remaining OAS leaders, hiding in Austria, hatch a new plan. They enlist the services of an apolitical British assassin given the code name "The Jackal," a figure already credited with the assassinations of Patrice Lumumba and Rafael Trujillo. The Jackal is aware targeting de Gaulle is extremely risky, but desires a comfortable retirement in anonymity. He insists on a fee of $500,000, half to be paid upfront into his Swiss bank account. The OAS uses its extensive network to raise the money through a series of bank robberies.

Preparing for his mission, the Jackal travels to Genoa where he commissions a custom single-shot rifle from a skilled gunsmith and secures fake identity papers, later killing the forger when he attempts to extort him. In Paris, the Jackal duplicates a key to a flat overlooking a square, setting the stage for the planned assassination. The OAS leadership has meanwhile relocated to Rome, still under the scrutiny of French security forces. French intelligence kidnap the OAS's chief clerk, Viktor Wolenski, who dies during interrogation but not before revealing crucial details of the plot, including the code word "Jackal". The Interior Minister convenes with top security officials and Police Commissioner Berthier recommends his deputy, Claude Lebel, lead the investigation under the constraints of secrecy. Lebel is granted special emergency powers despite de Gaulle's insistence on maintaining his public schedule.

Colonel St Clair, who is de Gaulle's personal military aide and a cabinet member, divulges classified details to his new mistress, Denise, an OAS agent. At the same time, Lebel is informed by Special Branch that a British national, Charles Harold Calthrop, might be connected to the assassination plot and travelling under an alias. The Jackal learns his plot is compromised, but decides to press forward with the mission. He seduces the aristocratic Colette de Montpellier in a hotel in Nice, but narrowly evades capture by Lebel and his team. He survives a motor vehicle collision and flees to Madame de Montpellier's country estate, and kills her when she reveals the police have already questioned her. Dyeing his hair and donning spectacles, he assumes another identity, that of a Danish schoolteacher, Per Lundquist, and boards a train for Paris.

Madame de Montpellier's murder allows Lebel to drop secrecy constraints and launch a public manhunt. The Jackal temporarily hides at the flat of a man he picks up in a Turkish bath, killing him when the man learns of Montpellier's murder. At a subsequent cabinet meeting, Lebel predicts the Jackal will try to shoot de Gaulle during the upcoming Liberation Day ceremony marking Paris's liberation during World War II. Lebel is dismissed from the investigation so the Minister can assumes personal command, and is then reinstated less than a day later when the Minister recognizes Lebel's expertise.

On Liberation Day, the Jackal disguises himself as an elderly French veteran, conceals his rifle within crutches, and accesses the room overlooking the ceremony. He takes aim but de Gaulle unexpectedly leans forward while presenting a medal, and the Jackal's shot narrowly misses. Jackal reloads for a second attempt, and Lebel and a gendarme storm the room. The Jackal kills the policeman before being fatally shot by Lebel.

Back in London, the real Charles Calthrop arrives at his flat, interrupting policemen sifting through his belongings. The assassin is interred in an unmarked grave, leaving the true identity behind his many disguises an enduring mystery.

== Cast ==
- Edward Fox as the Jackal, also known as Paul Duggan, Per Lundquist, and André Martin; a British assassin hired by the OAS to kill President Charles de Gaulle
- Terence Alexander as Lloyd
- Michel Auclair as Colonel Rolland, the head of the French SDECE Action Service
- Alan Badel as the French Interior Minister
- Tony Britton as Superintendent Bryan Thomas, a Metropolitan Police officer who helps uncover the Jackal's identities
- Denis Carey as Andre Casson, the head of the OAS-CNR underground in mainland France
- Adrien Cayla-Legrand as President Charles de Gaulle, the French head of state
- Cyril Cusack as Gozzi, the gunsmith who crafts the Jackal's weapon to use on de Gaulle
- Maurice Denham as General Colbert
- Vernon Dobtcheff as the Interrogator
- Jacques François as Pascal
- Olga Georges-Picot as Denise, Colonel St Clair's mistress
- Raymond Gérôme as Flavigny
- Barrie Ingham as St Clair, a military officer and unwitting leak to the OAS and the Jackal
- Derek Jacobi as Caron, Lebel's assistant
- Michel Lonsdale as Deputy Commissioner Claude Lebel, the man sent to find the Jackal
- Jean Martin as Viktor Wolenski, Rodin's bodyguard
- Ronald Pickup as the Forger, who creates the Jackal's fake ID
- Eric Porter as Colonel Marc Rodin, the OAS operations chief
- Anton Rodgers as Jules Bernard
- Delphine Seyrig as Colette de Montpellier, a rich woman whom the Jackal seduces
- Donald Sinden as Assistant Commissioner Mallinson
- Jean Sorel as Jean Bastien-Thiry, a real-life failed French Air Force assassin who was executed for his attack on President de Gaulle
- David Swift as Commandant Rene Montclair, the OAS treasurer
- Timothy West as Commissioner Berthier, the head of the French police and Lebel's superior
- Bernard Archard as Inspector Hughes
- Philippe Léotard as Paris Gendarme
- Edward Hardwicke as Charles Calthrop, a man whose identity was stolen by the Jackal
- David Kernan as the real Per Lundquist, whose identity the Jackal steals as a disguise
- Howard Vernon as Minister Lévesque
- Max Faulkner as a Special Branch Inspector
- Féodor Atkine as an OAS gunman
- Nicholas Young as Passport Officer
- Liliane Rovère as Hotel Chambermaid
- Andréa Ferréol as Hotel Staff

== Production ==
The Day of the Jackal was originally part of a two-picture deal between John Woolf and Fred Zinnemann, the other being an adaptation of the play Abelard and Heloise by Ronald Millar.

Universal Studios initially wanted to cast a major American actor as the Jackal, with Robert Redford and Jack Nicholson flown to Europe to audition. Although Universal favoured Nicholson, Zinnemann ultimately secured a production agreement stipulating that only European actors would be cast. Afterwards, British actors David McCallum, Ian Richardson and Michael York were considered, before Zinnemann cast Edward Fox. Jacqueline Bisset was offered the role of Denise, but had to decline due to scheduling conflicts.

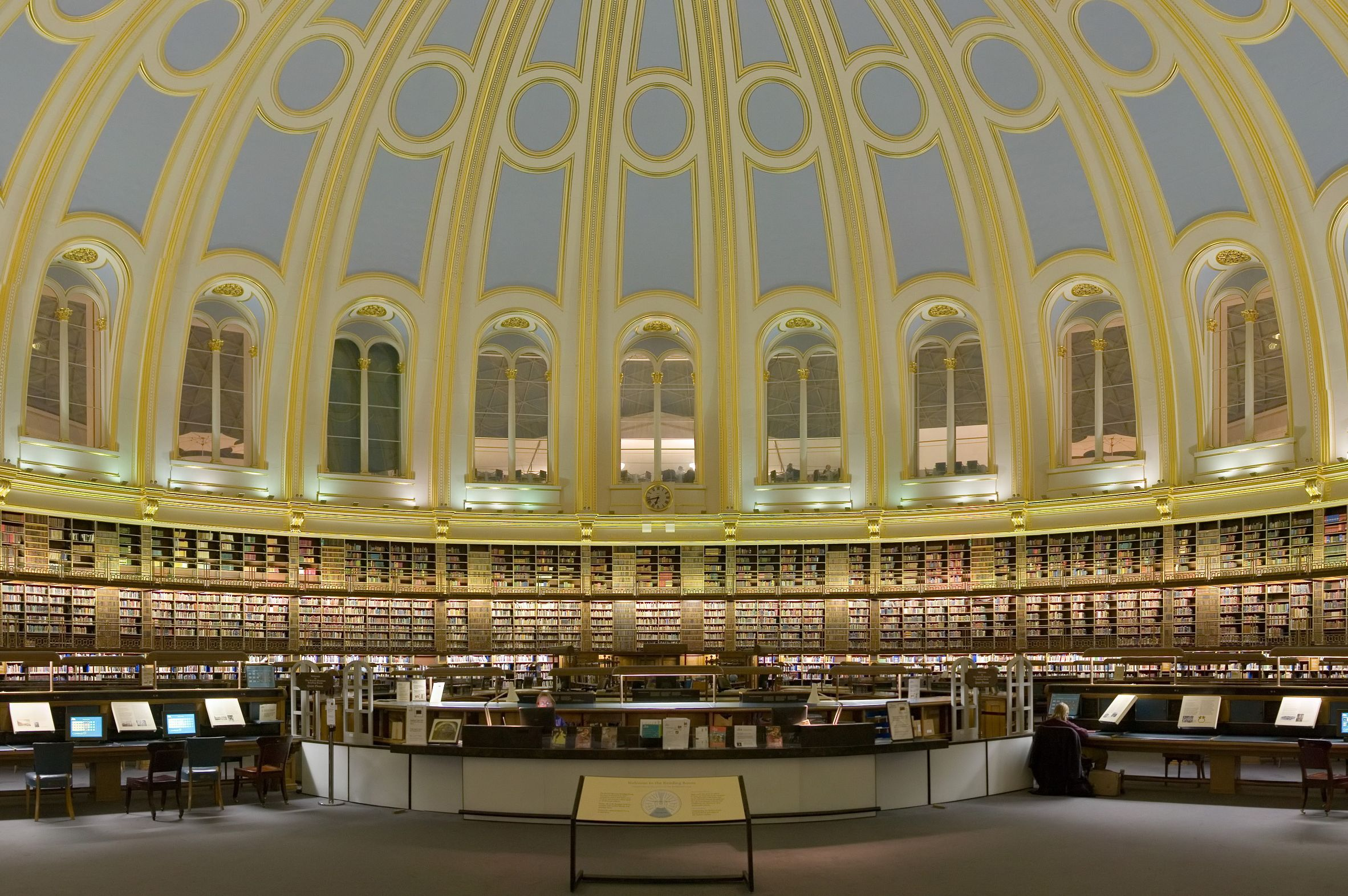
The Reading Room at the British Museum Library, where the Jackal reads Le Figaro

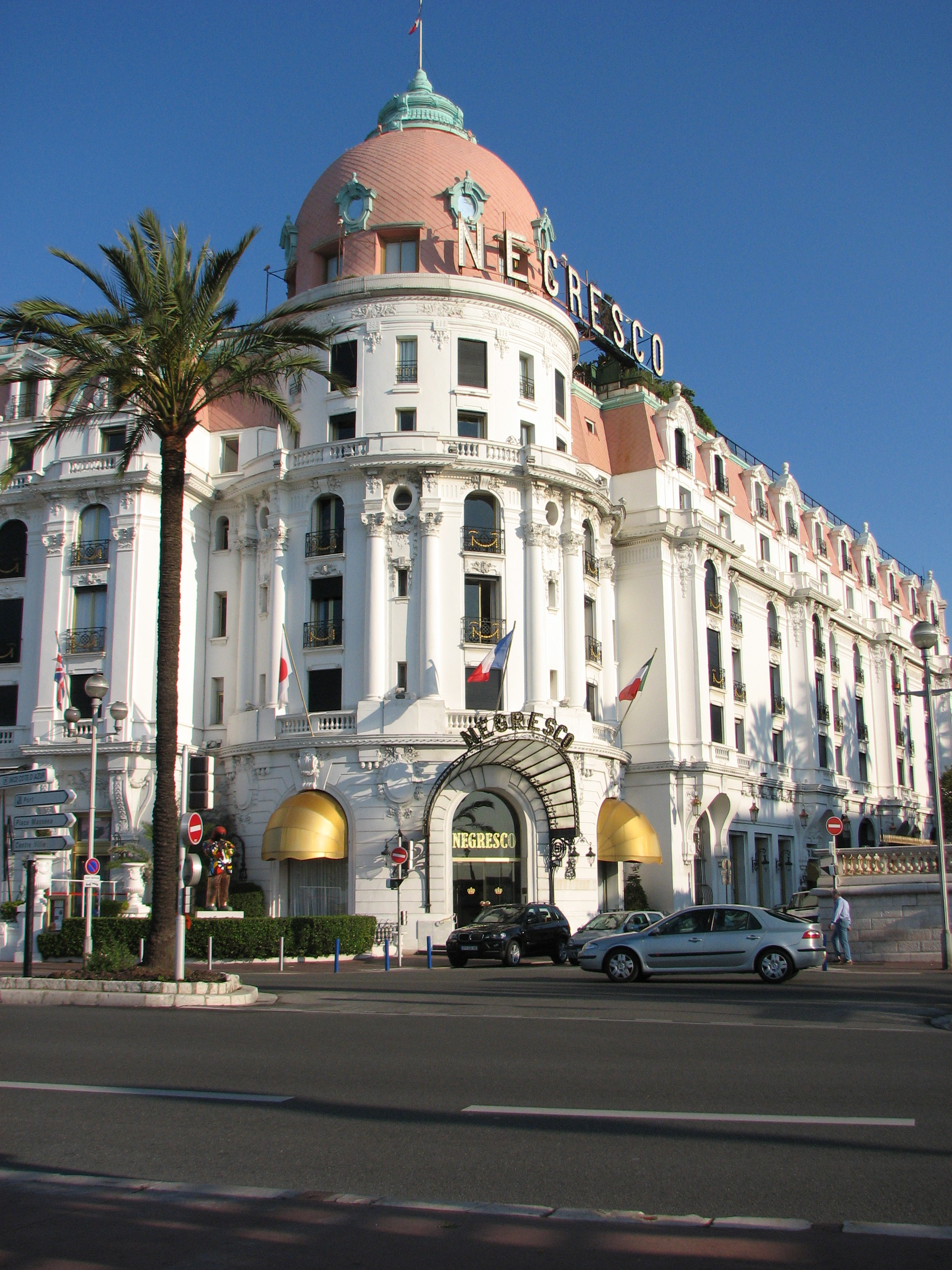
Hotel Negresco in Nice, where the Jackal learns his mission has been revealed.

The Day of the Jackal was filmed in studios and on location in France, Britain, Italy and Austria. Zinnemann was able to film in locations usually denied to filmmakers — such as inside the Ministry of the Interior — due in large part to French producer Julien Derode's skill in dealing with authorities. Nevertheless, the opening sequence was not shot in the Élysée Palace courtyard but at the Hôtel de Soubise, the main office of the French National Archives. The two palaces were both built at the beginning of the 18th century, but the Hôtel de Soubise is more accessible and has less security than the Élysée.

To lend a documentary-like authenticity to the final Liberation Day sequence, the film company obtained permission to use hand-held cameras inside police lines at the annual Fourteenth of July Bastille Day military parade down the Champs-Élysées. Viewers of The Day of the Jackal see extraordinary closeup footage of the massing of troops, tanks, and artillery. Since the Liberation Day sequence was filmed during a real parade, it led to confusion; the crowd (many of whom were unaware that a film was being shot) mistook the actors portraying police officers for real officers, and many tried to help them arrest the "suspects" they were apprehending in the crowd. Zinnemann wrote that Adrien Cayla-Legrand, the actor who played de Gaulle, was mistaken by several Parisians for the real de Gaulle — though the former French president had been dead for nearly two years prior to film production.

During the weekend of 15 August 1972, the Paris police cleared a very busy square of all traffic to film additional scenes.

Frederick Forsyth later wrote that for the film company to buy rights for his novel, he was offered two contract options: £20,000 for outright sale of the novel in perpetuity, or £17,500 plus a small percentage of the film's net profits. He took the £20,000, noting that such a payment was already a massive sum to him at the time, but due to his naïveté about finances, he waived rights to considerably more money given the film's enduring success.

=== List of locations ===
| Location | Sequence |
|---|---|
| 150 Rue de Rennes, Paris 6, France | Assassination sequence |
| Archives nationales, Hôtel de Soubise, 60 rue des Francs-Bourgeois, Paris 3 | As the Élysée Palace |
| Boulevard de la Reine, Versailles, France | Bank, as "Banque de Grenoble", in fact, a savings bank |
| Boulevard Marguerite-de-Rochechouart, Montmartre, Paris, France | Masked robbers flee in getaway car |
| Boulevard des Batignolles, Paris 17 | OAS contacts Denise |
| Boulogne Studios, avenue Jean-Baptiste Clément, Boulogne-Billancourt, France | Studio |
| British Museum, Great Russell Street, Bloomsbury, London, England | The Jackal reads Le Figaro |
| Champs-Élysées, Paris 8 | Military parade |
| Château du Saussay, Ballancourt-sur-Essonne, Essonne, France | Madame Colette de Montpellier's chateau |
| Entrevaux, Alpes-de-Haute-Provence, France | The Jackal drives by toward Paris |
| French Riviera, Alpes-Maritimes, France | |
| Gare d'Austerlitz, Place Valhubert, Quai d'Austerlitz, Paris 13 | |
| Great Russell Street, Bloomsbury, London | |
| Hôtel de Beauveau, Place Beauvau, Paris 8 | Ministry of Interior |
| Hotel Colombia, Genoa, Liguria, Italy | |
| Hotel Negresco, 37 Promenade des Anglais, Nice, Alpes-Maritimes, France | Jackal learns that his cover is blown |
| Imperia, Liguria, Italy | |
| La Bastide de Tourtour, Tourtour, Var, France | Hotel where the Jackal meets Colette |
| Limousin, France | |
| Piazza San Silvestro, Rome | Wolenski in the real central Post Office |
| Pinewood Studios, Iver Heath, Buckinghamshire, England | Studio |
| Place Charles Michels, Paris 15 | Van attacked |
| Place du 18 juin 1940, Paris 6 | Final assassination sequence |
| Place Vauban, Paris 7 | Biker stops to place phone call |
| Prater Park, Vienna, Austria | "Pension Kleist", Rendezvous with OAS heads |
| Quai d'Austerlitz, Paris 13 | |
| Rue du Faubourg Saint-Honoré, Paris | Outside the Palais de l'Élysée |
| Rue de Monttessuy, Paris 7 | Robbers blow up bank security van |
| Scotland Yard, Whitehall, London | UK police |
| Somerset House, Strand, London | The Jackal obtains a birth certificate |
| St. James's Park, London | |
| St. Mary's Church, Farnham Royal, England | "St Marks, Sambourne Fishley", the Jackal finds Duggan's gravestone |
| Ventimiglia, Liguria, Italy | Before crossing the border into France |
| Veynes, Hautes-Alpes, France | Train station, as Tulle station |
| Via di Panico, Rome | Kidnapping of Wolenski |
| Via Stefano Dondero, Genoa | Garage under railway line |
| Victoria Embankment, Westminster, London | UK police |

== Reception ==
=== Critical response ===
UK quad poster

The film holds a 91% score on Rotten Tomatoes, based on 35 reviews with an average rating of 8.1/10. The critics consensus reads, "The Day of the Jackal is a meticulously constructed thriller with surprising irreverence and taut direction." Metacritic, which uses a weighted average, assigned the film a score of 80 out of 100, based on 8 critics, indicating "generally favorable" reviews

Critics of the period were generally impressed with the film. Among those was Roger Ebert of the Chicago Sun-Times, who gave it his highest rating of four stars:

"Fred Zinnemann’s The Day of the Jackal is one hell of an exciting movie. I wasn’t prepared for how good it really is: it’s not just a suspense classic, but a beautifully executed example of filmmaking. It’s put together like a fine watch. The screenplay meticulously assembles an incredible array of material, and then Zinnemann choreographs it so that the story—complicated as it is—unfolds in almost documentary starkness. The Day of the Jackal is two and a half hours long and seems over in about fifteen minutes."

Ebert concluded: "Zinnemann has mastered every detail ... There are some words you hesitate to use in a review, because they sound so much like advertising copy, but in this case I can truthfully say that the movie is spellbinding." Ebert included the film at No. 7 on his list of the Top 10 films of 1973.

The Time film critic applauded the transition from novel to film:

"The Day of the Jackal makes one appreciate anew the wonderful narrative efficiency of the movies. Frederick Forsyth's bestselling novel — essentially what mystery buffs call a police procedural, but blown up to international proportions — kept losing its basically simple storyline in the forest of words. The writer required paragraphs to detail the procedures of an international manhunt, not to mention the procedures of the Jackal himself, a hired gun employed by disaffected French army officers to assassinate Charles de Gaulle. This is the kind of material that a good director can give us in the wink of a panning camera's eye."

The review continued, that due to the talents of director Fred Zinnemann, "what might have been just another expensive entertainment becomes, on a technical level, a textbook on reels in the near-forgotten subject of concise moviemaking. In short, as so often happens, a second-rate fiction has been transformed into a first-rate screen entertainment."

A few critics were less effusive. For example, William B. Collins wrote in The Philadelphia Inquirer:

"The picture cuts between The Jackal, carefully making his preparations, to the police taking their counter-measures. It is all detail work and not very exciting. The pace picks up noticeably when the assassin, all preliminaries behind him, motors across the Franco-Italian border and learns that his cover has been blown."

In a MacLeans Magazine review, John Hofsess wrote:

"The Jackal is not a great film, but it's a damn good one, one of the very few films released this year that is worth all the trouble and expense of going out to the movies. Zinnemann has a self-effacing directorial style; give him a good yarn and he tells it without any personal intrusions and attention-getting tics."

Hofsess added that it is "an authentically detailed suspense story with ingenious twists." Other critics used similar language, praising The Day of the Jackal as an intricate and detailed maze, entertaining and never tedious.

Critic Matt Brunson of Film Frenzy appreciated how the film did justice to the novel it was based on:

"Author Frederick Forsyth struck gold right out of the gate with his first fictional work, the 1971 international bestseller The Day of the Jackal, and then had the good fortune to watch it transformed into a motion picture that (unlike too many page-to-screen efforts) steadfastly avoided botching the source material. A largely faithful adaptation of Forsyth’s novel ... Fred Zinnemann, scripter Kenneth Ross, and editor Ralph Kemplen (earning this film’s sole Oscar nomination) all deserve high marks for ratcheting up the tension in a movie whose outcome is never in doubt (after all, de Gaulle died years later at home, at the age of 79)."

Likewise, the film critic for The Spectator opined:

"All of this the cinema is properly and effectively equipped to handle. Zinnemann, with the help of an excellent script from Kenneth Ross, has transferred the novel lock, stock, barrel and silencer to the screen. Nothing important has been left out. The added visual dimension means that Forsyth's lengthy descriptions of the Jackal's movements and equipment can be quickly expanded, and the extensive location shooting brings out the documentary aspect of the story to the full.... In other words, for those of you who have read the novel, going to The Day of the Jackal will be curiously like the experience of seeing the same film a second time round or seeing the filmed version of a stage play. For anyone who hasn't read Forsyth's book, the film can be recommended wholeheartedly."

As Empire magazine observed, Forsyth's scrupulously researched "pulp thriller" provided "the perfect template for this exhaustive procedural. In many ways, this outstanding piece of filmmaking marks the apotheosis of a certain style of thriller that has since fallen out of fashion—the mind game. [It is] built with the minutiae of a Swiss watch", without blandishments. The linear plot "is made infinitely complex by the portrayal of this empty vessel of a killer by Fox..." An irresistible force is pitted against an immovable object — a conflict facilitated by the script. TV Guide noted, "We watch his [the Jackal's] preparations which are so thorough we wonder how he could possibly fail even as we watch the French police attempt to pick up his trail."

Gannett news service critic Bernard Drew had both compliments and criticisms: "This is not a bad movie, it races by and entertains, after a fashion. It simply is not as good as it should have been. One wonders what Hitchcock or Costa-Gavras would have done with it. They would have cast it differently, cut down on the elaborate detailing, so much of which comes down to nothing, and the huge dramatis personae, and possibly might have made a better movie—more humorous, passionate, and credible—and then again, quite possibly not."

A list of the 100 favorite movies of Japanese filmmaker Akira Kurosawa included The Day of the Jackal.

=== Box office ===
The movie grossed $16,056,255 at the box office, earning North American rentals of $8,525,000. Zinnemann was pleasantly surprised by the commercial results, telling an interviewer in 1993: "The idea that excited me was to make a suspense film where everybody knew the end - that de Gaulle was not killed. In spite of knowing the end, would the audience sit still? And it turned out that they did, just as the readers of the book did."

John Woolf later made another film from a Forsyth novel, The Odessa File.

== Awards and nominations ==
The Day of the Jackal and the resultant Academy Award nomination were career milestones for Kenneth Ross, the Scottish-American screenwriter. (Note: Ross was later nominated for an Edgar Award for his screenplay of Black Sunday (1977). His other credits include the play Tømmerflåden, and the films Brother Sun, Sister Moon, The Odessa File (another adaptation of a Frederick Forsyth novel), and The Fourth War.)

| Award | Category | Nominee(s) | Result |
|---|---|---|---|
| Academy Awards, 1974 | Best Film Editing | Ralph Kemplen | Nominated |
| American Cinema Editors Awards, 1974 | Best Edited Feature Film – Dramatic | Ralph Kemplen | Nominated |
| BAFTA Awards, 1974 | Best Film Editing | Ralph Kemplen | Won |
| BAFTA Awards, 1974 | Best Film | The Day of the Jackal | Nominated |
| BAFTA Awards, 1974 | Best Direction | Fred Zinnemann | Nominated |
| BAFTA Awards, 1974 | Best Screenplay | Kenneth Ross | Nominated |
| BAFTA Awards, 1974 | Best Sound Track | Nicholas Stevenson, Bob Allen | Nominated |
| BAFTA Awards, 1974 | Best Supporting Actor | Michael Lonsdale | Nominated |
| BAFTA Awards, 1974 | Best Supporting Actress | Delphine Seyrig | Nominated |
| Golden Globe Awards, 1974 | Best Director | Fred Zinnemann | Nominated |
| Golden Globe Awards, 1974 | Best Motion Picture, Drama | The Day of the Jackal | Nominated |
| Golden Globe Awards, 1974 | Best Screenplay | Kenneth Ross | Nominated |

== Remakes ==
- August 1 (1988) — An Indian Malayalam-language film directed by Sibi Malayil, written by S. N. Swamy, and starring Mammootty, Sukumaran, Captain Raju and Urvashi. This adaptation relocates the story to the Indian state of Kerala.
- The Jackal (1997) — An American film directed by Michael Caton-Jones, written by Chuck Pfarrer, and starring Bruce Willis, Richard Gere, Sidney Poitier and Diane Venora. Forsyth, Woolf, Zinnemann and Fox opposed the production and filed an injunction to prevent Universal Pictures from using the name of the original novel and film, and it would be marketed as being "inspired by" rather than directly based on Forsyth's novel. The film does not credit Forsyth's novel as source material, and only credits Kenneth Ross with "earlier screenplay."
- The Day of the Jackal (2024) — A British television drama serial adaptation of the Frederick Forsyth novel of the same name. It stars Eddie Redmayne, is produced by Ronan Bennett and directed by Brian Kirk.

== See also ==
- BFI Top 100 British films
