= The Day of the Jackal =

1971 thriller novel by Frederick Forsyth

- 1971 UK 1st Edition dustjacket (spine & front)
- Author: Frederick Forsyth
- Language: English
- Genre: Spy, Thriller, Historical novel
- Publisher: Hutchinson & Co (UK); Viking Press (US)
- Publication date: 7 June 1971 (UK); 6 August 1971 (US)
- Publication place: United Kingdom
- Media type: Print (hardback & paperback)
- Pages: 358 (first edition, UK); 380 (first edition, US)
- ISBN: 0-09-107390-1 (first edition, hardback)
- OCLC: 213704
- Dewey Decimal: 823/.9/14
- LC Class: PZ4.F7349 Day3 PR6056.O699

The Day of the Jackal is a 1971 political thriller novel by English author Frederick Forsyth about a professional assassin who is contracted by the OAS, a French dissident paramilitary organisation, to kill Charles de Gaulle, the president of France.

The novel received admiring reviews and praise when first published in 1971, and it received a 1972 Best Novel Edgar Award from the Mystery Writers of America. The novel remains popular, and in 2003 it was listed on the BBC's survey The Big Read.

The novel begins as historical fiction; the OAS did exist and conspired to commit the act with which the book opens, giving an accurate depiction of the attempt to assassinate General de Gaulle by Jean-Marie Bastien-Thiry on 22 August 1962. The subsequent plot is fiction.

== Plot ==
=== Part One: Anatomy of a Plot ===
In 1962, after the failed assassination attempt on Charles de Gaulle, Lieutenant-Colonel Jean-Marie Bastien-Thiry and other OAS conspirators were arrested in Petit-Clamart by authorities after the Évian Accords granted Algeria independence. The SDECE infiltrated the OAS, seizing and interrogating Antoine Argoud, the operation commander. The failure of the Petit-Clamart attempt, a betrayal of a subsequent plot at the École Militaire, and Bastien-Thiry's execution marked a significant crackdown.

Argoud's deputy Lt-Col Marc Rodin believed success in killing de Gaulle required hiring an unknown mercenary outside the organization. He contacted a British hitman in Vienna, who agreed to kill de Gaulle for US$500,000, half upfront and half after. The assassin chose the code name "The Jackal," and the OAS personnel hid in a guarded hotel in Rome to avoid capture.

The Jackal acquires a legitimate British passport under a fake name, "Alexander Duggan", steals two more passports from foreign tourists visiting London who superficially resemble him for use as contingency identities. Using Duggan's identity, he later travels to Brussels, where he commissions a master gunsmith to build him a special suppressed sniper rifle of extreme slimness with a small supply of mercury-tipped explosive bullets. He also acquires a set of forged French identity papers from a professional forger. The latter makes the mistake of attempting to blackmail him, for which the Jackal kills him. After researching about de Gaulle, the Jackal travels to Paris to reconnoitre the most favourable spot and the best possible day for the assassination.

Following armed robberies in France, the OAS deposits the first half of the Jackal's fee into his Swiss bank account. French authorities, suspicious of Rodin and his subordinates, send a fake letter that lures Viktor Kowalski, a bodyguard, to France, where he's caught and interrogated. His incoherent ramblings help the secret service decipher Rodin's plot and the name "Jackal," but not the assassin. De Gaulle refuses to cancel public appearances and insists that the investigation remain secret.

Roger Frey, the French Minister of the Interior, organises a conference of the heads of the French security authorities. Because Rodin and his men are in a foreign hotel under heavy guard, a Commissioner of the Police Judiciaire reasons that their first and most essential objective is to establish the Jackal's true identity, and he volunteers his own deputy commissioner: Claude Lebel.

=== Part Two: Anatomy of a Manhunt ===
Granted special emergency powers to conduct his investigation, Lebel does everything possible to uncover the Jackal's identity. He first calls upon his old boy network of foreign intelligence and police contacts to inquire if they have any records of a top-class political assassin. Most of the inquiries are fruitless, but in the United Kingdom, the matter is eventually passed on to the Special Branch of Scotland Yard, and another veteran detective, Superintendent Bryn Thomas.

A routine search through Special Branch's records turns up nothing. However, one of Thomas's subordinates suggests that if the assassin were an Englishman, but primarily operated abroad, he would most probably come to the attention of the Secret Intelligence Service. Thomas makes an informal inquiry with a friend of his on the SIS's staff, who mentions hearing a rumour from an officer stationed in the Dominican Republic at the time of President Trujillo's assassination. The rumour states that a hired assassin stopped Trujillo's car with a rifle shot, allowing a gang of partisans to finish him off. Additionally, Thomas also learns that the assassin was an Englishman, whom he identifies as a man named "Charles Calthrop".

Thomas is then surprised when he receives a summons in person to report to the Prime Minister (unnamed, but most probably intended to represent Harold Macmillan), who informs him that word of his inquiries has reached higher circles in the British government. Despite the general enmity felt by much of the government against France and, more precisely, de Gaulle, the Prime Minister informs Thomas that de Gaulle is his friend, and that the assassin must be identified and stopped, with limitless resources, manpower and expenses at Thomas' disposal. He is handed a commission similar to Lebel's, with temporary powers allowing him to override almost any other authority in the land. Investigating the name of "Charles Calthrop", Thomas finds a match to a man living in London, said to be on holiday. While Thomas confirms that this individual was indeed in the Dominican Republic at the time of Trujillo's death, he does not believe it justifies informing Lebel, until one of his junior detectives realises that the first three letters of his first name and surname (i.e. "CHA-rles CAL-throp") forms "Chacal", the French word for "Jackal".

Unknown to any member of the council in France, there is an OAS mole among them: the mistress of an arrogant Air Force colonel attached to de Gaulle's staff. Through pillow talk, the officer unwittingly feeds her a constant stream of information as to Lebel's progress. The assassin enters France through Italy, driving a rented Alfa Romeo sports car with his disassembled weapon soldered to the chassis. Although he receives word from the OAS agent that the French are on the lookout for him, he assesses that he will succeed whatever happens and decides to take the risk. In London, the Special Branch raids Calthrop's flat, finding his passport, and deduces that he must be travelling on a fake identity. A search for suspicious passport applications reveals one in the name of Duggan. When they discover that the Jackal may be travelling as Duggan, Lebel and a police force almost apprehend him in the south of France, but owing to his OAS contact, he leaves his hotel early and evades them by only an hour. With the police on the lookout for him, the Jackal seeks refuge in the château of a woman whom he encountered and seduced at the hotel. A few days later, after eavesdropping on his morning phone call, she searches his belongings and finds the component parts of his rifle. He then kills her before she can sound the alarm, and flees after disguising himself as the first of his two emergency identities. Before leaving this region, he disposes of Duggan's belongings in a ravine. The woman's body is only discovered hours later, allowing the Jackal to board a train for Paris.

=== Part Three: Anatomy of a Kill ===
Having failed to capture the Jackal at least twice, and with each imminent arrest happening hours after the conference was informed, Lebel becomes suspicious of what the rest of the council label the killer's apparent "good luck", and orders the telephones of all the members to be tapped, which leads him to discover the leak. The disgraced Air Force officer withdraws from the meeting and subsequently submits his resignation. When Thomas investigates and identifies reports of stolen or missing passports in London in the preceding months, he closes in on the Jackal's remaining secondary identities. Meanwhile, the Jackal slips into a small hotel upon arriving in Paris (narrowly evading a police checkpoint), disposes of his first emergency identity, and masquerades as the owner of the second stolen passport.

During a council meeting on 22 August 1963, Lebel deduces that the killer has decided to target de Gaulle three days later, on 25 August, the anniversary of the liberation of Paris during World War II. It is, he realises, the one day of the year when de Gaulle can definitely be counted on to be in Paris and make a public appearance. Despite his initial intentions to keep the investigation a confidential affair, Charles de Gaulle ultimately authorises Lebel to release the Jackal's most updated picture and name to the newspapers, identifying him as a wanted man after he has killed the woman. Believing the inquiry to be over, Roger Frey similarly orchestrates a massive, citywide manhunt for the foreigner now that he can be publicly reported as a murderer. He dismisses Lebel with hearty congratulations – but the killer eludes them yet again: slipping into a gay bar while posing as his new contingency identity, he gets himself picked up by a local man and taken to his flat, where he kills him after a news reporter mentions that "Martin Schulberg" (whose identity the Englishman is using) is wanted for murder, and waits out the remaining days.

On the 24th, Roger Frey summons Lebel yet again and tells him that the Jackal still cannot be found. The detective listens to the details of Charles de Gaulle's schedule and security arrangements, but can suggest nothing more helpful than that everyone "should keep their eyes open", much to the Interior Minister's dismay. On the 25th itself, the Jackal, pretending to be a one-legged French war veteran, penetrates the security checkpoints carrying his custom gun concealed in the sections of a crutch. He enters an apartment building overlooking the Place du 18 Juin 1940 (in front of the soon-to-be-demolished façade of the Gare Montparnasse), where de Gaulle is present. As the ceremony begins, Lebel is walking around the street, questioning and re-questioning every police checkpoint. When he hears from one CRS guard about a one-legged veteran with a crutch, he realises what the Jackal's plan is and rushes into the apartment building, calling for the patrol to follow him.

Having sneaked into a suitable apartment to shoot from, the Jackal prepares his weapon and takes aim at de Gaulle's head, but his first shot misses by a fraction of an inch when the President unexpectedly leans forward to kiss the cheeks of the veteran he is honouring. Outside the apartment, Lebel and the CRS man arrive on the top floor in time to hear the sound of the first, silenced shot. The guard bursts in as the Jackal is reloading: the Englishman turns and fires, killing the guard. At this point, the detective and the killer, having developed grudging respect for each other during the pursuit, share a brief glance of recognition. The Jackal scrambles to load his third and last bullet while the unarmed Lebel snatches up the dead policeman's sub-machine gun: Lebel is faster and shoots the Jackal, killing him instantly.

=== Epilogue ===
In London, the Special Branch are searching Calthrop's apartment when the real Charles Calthrop storms in and demands to know what they are doing. Once it is established that Calthrop truly has been on holiday in Scotland and is totally separate from the killer, the British are left to wonder "if the Jackal wasn't Calthrop, then who the hell was he?"

The Jackal is buried in an unmarked grave in a Paris cemetery, officially recorded as "an unknown foreign tourist, killed in a car accident." Aside from a priest, a policeman, registrar and grave-diggers, the only other person attending the burial is Inspector Claude Lebel, who then leaves the cemetery to return home.

== Origins ==
The cover of The Biafra Story

Over the three years immediately prior to his writing The Day of the Jackal, Forsyth spent most of his time in West Africa covering the Biafran war, initially for the BBC in 1967 and subsequently for another eighteen months as a freelance journalist in 1968–1969. Upon his return to Britain his first book, the non-fiction The Biafra Story: The Making of an African Legend about that brutal civil war during which Nigeria fought to prevent the secession of its eastern province, was published as a paperback by Penguin Books in late 1969. To Forsyth's disappointment, however, the book sold very few copies and so with the arrival of the 1970s the then 31 year-old freelance journalist, international adventurer, and onetime youngest (at 19) fighter pilot in the RAF found himself both out of work and "flat broke". To solve his financial problems he thus decided to try his hand at fiction by writing a political thriller as a "one-off" project to "clear his debts". Unlike most novelists, however, Forsyth would employ the same type of research techniques that he had used as an investigative reporter to bring a sense of increased reality to his work of fiction, a story which he first began to consider writing in 1962–1963 while posted to Paris as a young Reuters foreign correspondent.

When Forsyth arrived in 1962, French president Charles de Gaulle had most recently granted independence to Algeria to end the eight-year Algerian War, a highly controversial act that had incurred the wrath of the anti-decolonisation paramilitary group Organisation Armée Secrète (OAS) which then vowed to assassinate him. Forsyth befriended several of the President's bodyguards and personally reported from the scene of the failed August 1962 assassination attempt along the Avenue de la Libération during which de Gaulle and his wife narrowly escaped death in a fusillade of gunfire in the roadside ambush, the most serious of six overall attempts the OAS would make on his life. Forsyth incorporated an account of that real-life event to open his new novel throughout which he also employed many other aspects and details about France, its politics, the OAS, and international law enforcement that he had learned during his career as an investigative journalist. Forsyth noted that virtually all OAS members and sympathizers were known to, and under surveillance by, French authorities—a key factor in the failure of their assassination attempts. In his 2015 memoir The Outsider, Forsyth wrote that during his time in France he briefly considered that the OAS might assassinate de Gaulle if they hired a man or men who were completely unknown to French authorities – an idea he would later expand upon in Jackal.

== Publishing history ==
UK first edition spine

Although Forsyth wrote The Day of the Jackal in 35 days in January and February 1970, it remained unpublished for almost a year and a half thereafter as he sought a publisher willing to accept his unsolicited 140,000-word manuscript. Four publishing houses rejected it between February and September because their editors believed a fictional account of the OAS hiring a British assassin in 1963 to kill Charles de Gaulle would not be commercially successful, given the fact that he had never been shot and, when the book was written, de Gaulle was in fact still alive and retired from public life.

The editors told Forsyth that they felt that these well-known facts essentially abrogated the suspense of his fictional assassination plot against de Gaulle as readers would already know it would not and could not possibly have been successful. (De Gaulle subsequently died of natural causes at his country home in Colombey-les-Deux-Églises in November 1970 following a peaceful retirement.) Following these rejections, Forsyth took a different strategy and wrote a short summary of the novel to present to publishers, noting that the focus was not on the plausibility of the assassination itself, but rather on the technical details and manhunt. He persuaded London-based Hutchinson & Co. to take a chance on publishing his novel; however, they only agreed to a relatively small initial printing of just 8,000 copies for its 358-page red and gold clothbound first edition. Forsyth was signed to a three-book contract: a £500 advance for Jackal, followed by another £6,000 advance for the second and third novels. Although the book was not formally reviewed by the press prior to its initial June 1971 UK publication, widespread word of mouth resulted in brisk advance and post-publication sales leading to repeated additional printings.

The book's unexpected success in Britain soon attracted the attention of Viking Press in New York which quickly acquired the US publication rights for $365,000 (£100,000)—then a very substantial sum for such a work and especially for that of a first-time author. These fees (the equivalent of $2.9 million in 2025) were split equally between Hutchinson and Forsyth, which led the self-described "flat broke" author to observe later that he had "never seen money like it and never thought I would." Just two months after its publication in the UK the 380-page clothbound Viking first edition was released in the US at $7.95 and with a distinctive jacket designed by noted American artist Paul Bacon.

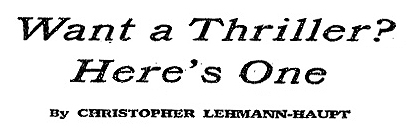
The New York Times review headline

The first US edition's launch was considerably aided by two glowing reviews in The New York Times by senior daily book reviewer Christopher Lehmann-Haupt three days before its release, and by the American mystery writer Stanley Bernard Ellin the week after. (Note: "Regardless of whether [a] book was written by a new or established author, being positively reviewed [in the New York Times] significantly increased sales; a positive review generated between a 32% and 52% percent increase in demand." Berger, Jonah (The Wharton School, University of Pennsylvania), Sorensen, Alan T. (Stanford Graduate School of Business, Stanford University), Rasmussen, Scott J. (Stanford University) "Positive Effects of Negative Publicity: When Negative Reviews Increase Sales". Marketing Science (Professional journal), Sept/Oct 2010 (Vol. 29, No. 5), pp. 815–827) In mid-October it reached No. 1 on the Times Best Seller List for fiction and by mid-December 136,000 copies of Viking's US edition were already in print. Over two-and-a-half million copies were sold worldwide by 1975. As in the UK, over forty years later The Day of the Jackal still remains in print in the US published now by Penguin Books (which acquired Viking in 1975) as a New American Library imprint. Hundreds of other print, electronic, and audio editions have been produced around the world since 1971 with many more millions of copies now in print in both English and the thirty other languages into which it has been translated including Spanish, German, French, Russian, Turkish, Czech, Polish, Italian, Portuguese, Swedish, Finnish, Danish, Hebrew, Latvian, Chinese, Japanese, Korean, and Thai.

The Day of the Jackal was published in serial format in 1971 in both the London Evening Standard and Israel's oldest daily newspaper, Ha'aretz. Earning Forsyth the 1972 Edgar Allan Poe Award for Best Novel, in 1973 it was also made into a 143-minute feature film directed by Fred Zinnemann. In 2011 a number of special "40th Anniversary" editions of The Day of the Jackal were released in the UK, US, and elsewhere to commemorate the four decades of continuous success of the book, the first of 18 more Forsyth novels and collections of his short stories published since the 1971 release of his seminal debut thriller.

== Film adaptations ==
- The film The Day of the Jackal was released in 1973, directed by Fred Zinnemann and starring Edward Fox as The Jackal, Michael Lonsdale as Lebel, and Derek Jacobi as Caron. It follows the novel rather faithfully, although it has several cosmetic changes.
- An Indian film in Malayalam titled August 1 (1988), directed by Sibi Malayil, is loosely based on the novel. It stars Mammootty, Captain Raju and Sukumaran in pivotal roles.
- A film titled The Jackal, directed by Michael Caton-Jones, was released in 1997. The film bears little resemblance to the plot of the novel or the original film, featuring an unnamed assassin (Bruce Willis) being hired by the Russian mafia to kill the First Lady of the United States. Both Zinnemann and Forsyth lobbied to have the film's name changed to disassociate it from Forsyth's novel.

== Television adaptation ==
Sky and Peacock ordered a television series adaptation of the novel, produced by Carnival Films and Sky Studios with Ronan Bennett as showrunner and Brian Kirk as director. Eddie Redmayne plays the Jackal.

== Influence on later events ==
The method for acquiring a false identity and UK passport detailed in the book is often referred to as the "Day of the Jackal fraud" and remained a well known security loophole in the UK until 2007. It was used by the Metropolitan Police to create false identities for undercover police officers between the 1960s and 1990s, a practice referred to as a "jackal run," which caused controversy when it came to light in the 2010s.

The New Zealand Member of Parliament David Garrett claimed the novel's description of identity theft inspired him to create his own fake passport as a "youthful prank". The incident further inflamed a national controversy over the law and order campaigner's criminal history.

In 1975, the Venezuelan terrorist Carlos was dubbed "The Jackal" by The Guardian after one of its correspondents reportedly spotted the novel near some of the fugitive's belongings.

A copy of the Hebrew translation of The Day of the Jackal was found in possession of Yigal Amir, the Israeli who in 1995 assassinated Yitzhak Rabin, Prime Minister of Israel.

Would-be assassin Vladimir Arutinian, who attempted to kill US president George W. Bush during his 2005 visit to the Republic of Georgia, was an obsessive reader of the novel and kept an annotated version of it during his planning for the assassination.

== References to other Forsyth books ==
- In the prelude to The Dogs of War, Forsyth describes every member of Carlo Shannon's mercenary squad. One of them, Kurt Semmler, is said to lose his respect for Colonel Marc Rodin when the OAS finally crumbled, which leads readers to assume that when the Jackal was killed, the OAS fell apart.
- In both this book and The Dogs of War, Forsyth explains how the French police collect information from residents of hotels in the country.

== See also ==
- Citroën DS
- Cordite, which the assassin ingests to appear ill
- The Jackal
- Charles Stopford
