= Orthopedic boot =

Medical device

Walking boot
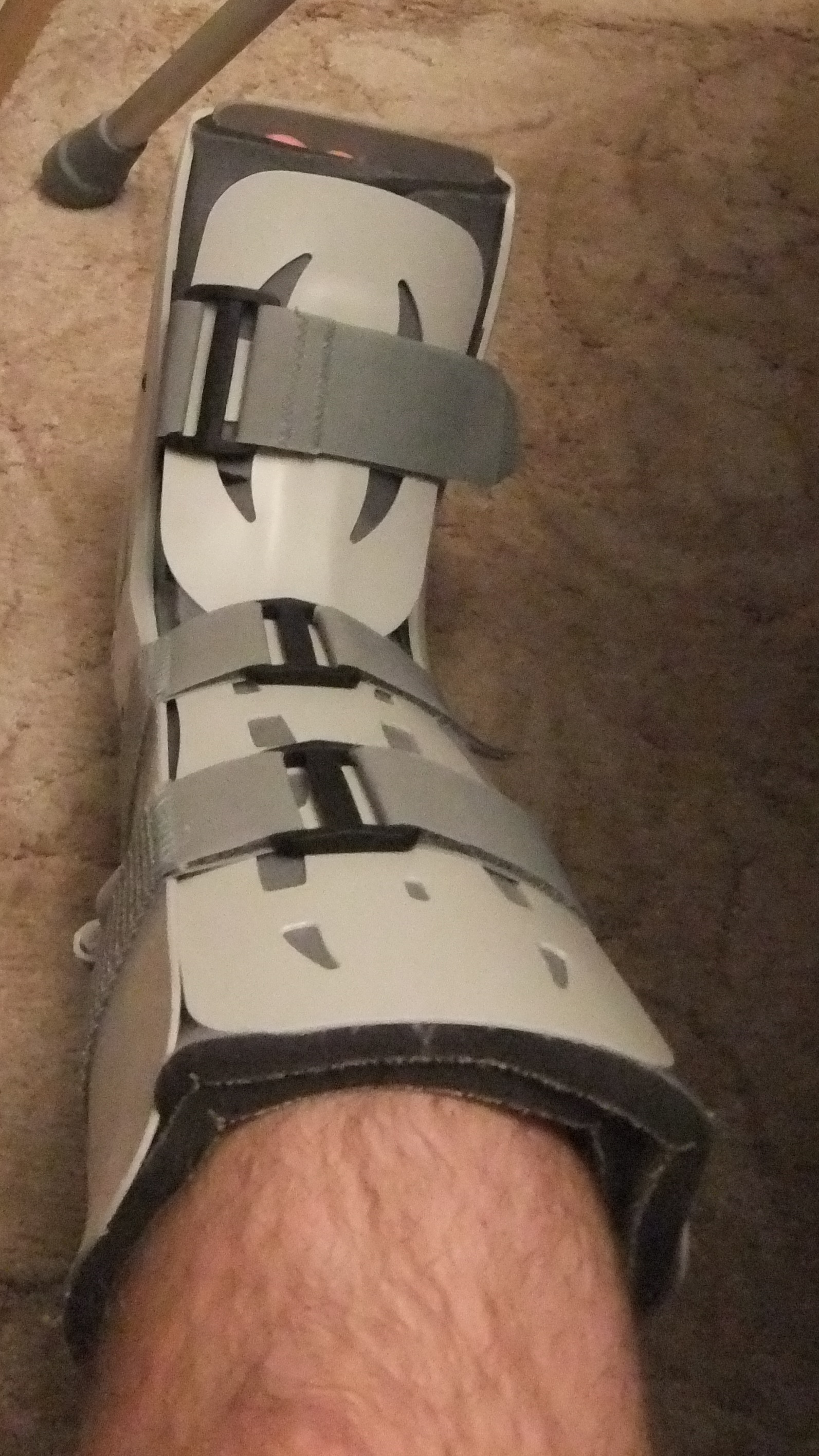
- A walking boot being used to aid weight bearing after an ankle fracture.

An orthopedic boot is used for the treatment of injuries of the foot or ankle. Along with orthopedic casts, leg braces, splints and orthotics, they can immobilize and shift weight bearing to help treat injuries to the foot area. Varieties include the controlled ankle motion walking boot (or controlled ankle movement walking boot, below knee walking boot, CAM boot, CAM walker, or moon boot), an orthopedic device prescribed for the treatment and stabilization of severe sprains, fractures, and tendon or ligament tears in the ankle or foot. In situations where ankle motion but not weight is to be limited, it may be used in place of a cast. In addition to treatment based orthopedic boots and bracing- long term/ permanently applied and fitted boots, footwear and bracing could be prescribed for various medical conditions.

== Description ==
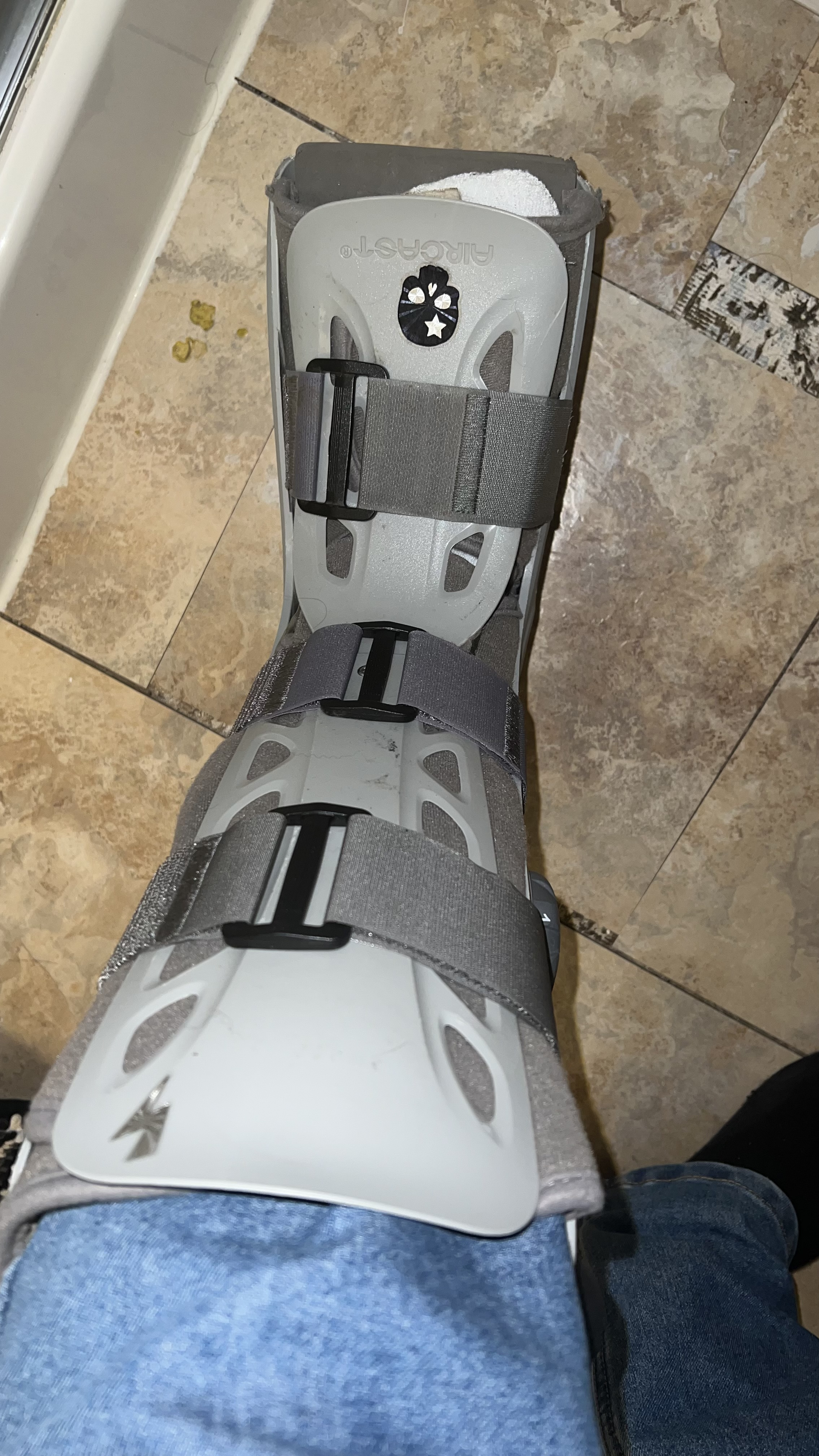
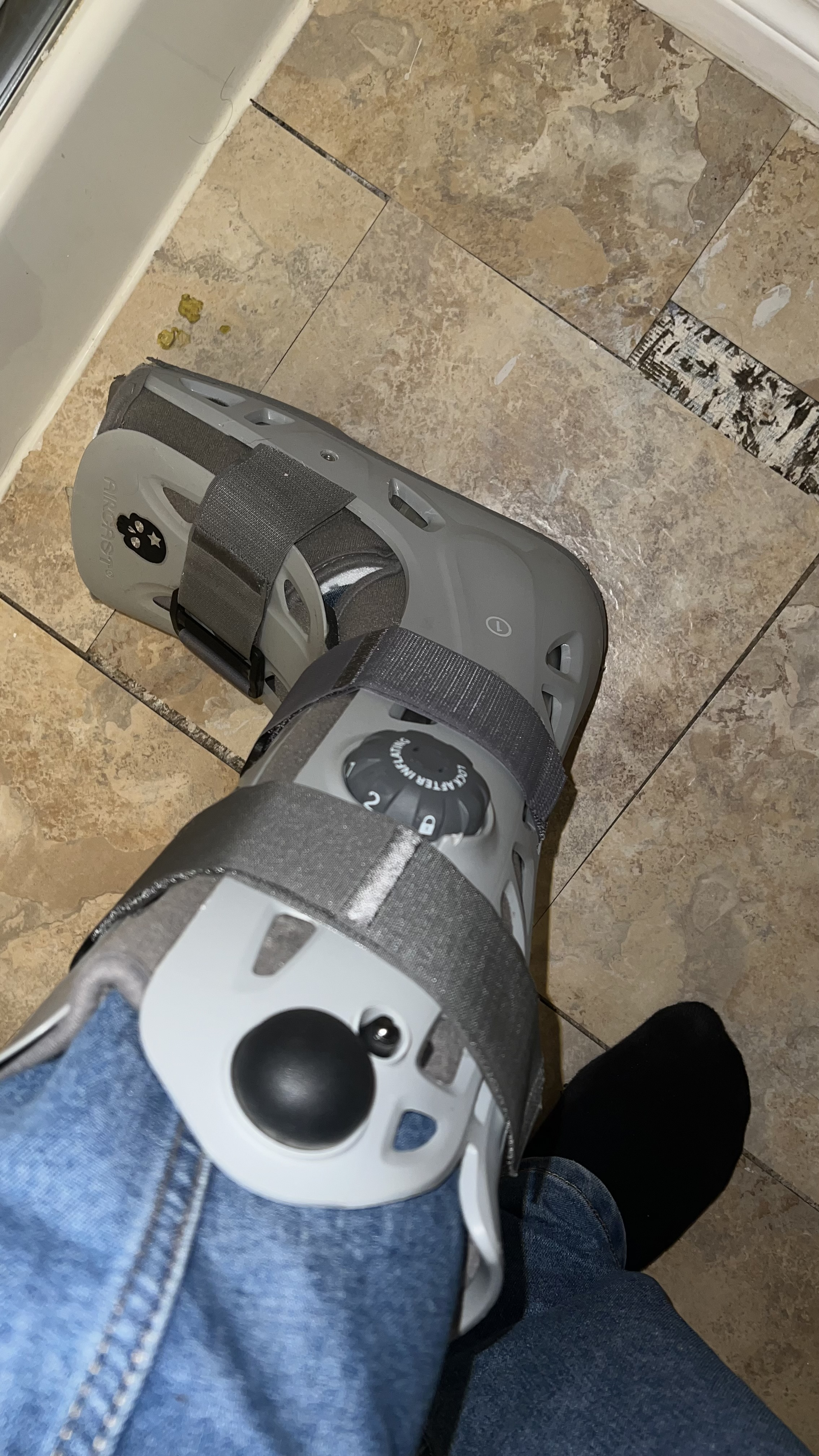
A walking boot being worn in place of a cast to treat a broken ankle. The air pump system can be seen on the side of the boot to inflate the boot to provide added support

A walking boot consists of:

- An inner lining, usually fabric, with hook and loop fasteners which encloses and cushions the patient's foot and ankle
- A rigid frame to restrict motion in the lower leg
- A hard plastic shell that provides rigidity and protection to the leg
- Adjustable closure system that allows for proper fitting to various leg sizes

== Variations ==
CAM walkers may range in height from mid-calf to nearly knee-length, depending on the condition they are meant to treat. Some contain inflatable compartments that can be adjusted by the patient for maximum support and comfort. For further protection of the injured ankle and leg, CAM walkers may also utilize a more extensive plastic shell that also encloses the back and sides of the walker, with detachable plastic plates for the front.

== Comparison to casting ==
While CAM walkers do not provide the same degree of immobility that an orthopedic cast offers, they have some advantages. Unlike casts, they are adjustable and reusable, and fully removable, permitting the patient to bathe the foot and ankle and remove the walker at night, if they so desire; and a CAM walker requires no special modifications for the patient to bear weight and walk. With some fractures, however, removal may result in worse outcomes and thus this may be a negative; also, with some fractures, the person should be non-weight bearing. Additionally, there is greater cost.

For more severe fractures, a traditional cast may still be preferable. In addition long term/ permanently applied and fitted boots, footwear and bracing could be prescribed for various medical conditions.
