= The Exploited discography =

- Studio albums: 8
- EPs: 9
- Live albums: 6
- Compilation albums: 8
- Singles: 4
- Video albums: 8
- Music videos: 7
- Box sets: 4

This is the discography of Scottish punk rock band the Exploited.

== Albums ==
=== Studio albums ===
Title	Album details	Peak chart positions		
Title	Album details	UK	UK Indie	FIN
Punks Not Dead	Released: May 1981; Label: Secret; Formats: LP, MC	20	1	—
Troops of Tomorrow	Released: June 1982; Label: Secret; Formats: LP, MC	17	1	20
Let's Start a War... (Said Maggie One Day)	Released: December 1983; Label: Pax, Combat; Formats: LP, MC	—	8	—
Horror Epics	Released: March 1985; Label: Dojo, Combat; Formats: LP, MC	—	17	—
Death Before Dishonour	Released: July 1987; Label: Rough Justice, Combat; Formats: CD, LP, MC	—	16	—
The Massacre	Released: 24 September 1990; Label: Rough Justice, Triple X; Formats: CD, LP, MC	—	—	—
Beat the Bastards	Released: March 1996; Label: Rough Justice, Triple X; Formats: CD, LP, MC	—	—	—
Fuck the System	Released: 24 February 2003; Label: Dream Catcher, Spitfire; Formats: CD, LP, MC	—	—	—
"—" denotes releases that did not chart or were not released in that territory.

=== Live albums ===
Title	Album details	Peak chart positions	
Title	Album details	UK	UK Indie
On Stage	Released: 9 November 1981; Label: The Exploited Record Company; Formats: LP; Unofficial release	52	2
Live at the Whitehouse	Released: January 1986; Label: Self-release, Combat Core; Formats: LP, MC	—	24
Live and Loud!!	Released: 1987; Label: Link; Formats: LP, MC	—	—
Live Lewd Lust	Released: July 1989; Label: Grand Slamm; Formats: CD, LP, MC; US-only release	—	—
Live in Japan	Released: 21 September 1992; Label: Toy's Factory; Formats: CD; Japan-only release	—	—
Live Leeds '83	Released: 2007; Label: Anarchy Music; Formats: LP; Limited release	—	—
"—" denotes releases that did not chart or were not released in that territory.

=== Compilation albums ===
Title	Album details	Peak chart positions
Title	Album details	UK Indie
Totally Exploited	Released: December 1984; Label: Dojo/Blashadabee; Formats: LP	16
Singles Collection	Released: 27 January 1992; Label: Streetlink; Formats: CD	—
Don't Forget the Chaos	Released: April 1992; Label: Cleopatra; Formats: CD, LP, MC	—
Dead Cities	Released: July 2000; Label: Hay May; Formats: CD	—
Punk Singles & Rarities 1980–83	Released: March 2001; Label: Captain Oi!; Formats: CD	—
Twenty Five Years of Anarchy and Chaos: The Best of the Exploited	Released: March 2004; Label: Dream Catcher; Formats: CD, MC	—
Anthology of the Exploited	Released: 23 July 2012; Label: Cherry Red; Formats: digital download	—
Exploited Barmy Army – The Collection	Released: 6 May 2013; Label: PressPlay; Formats: CD	—
"—" denotes releases that did not chart.

=== Box sets ===
Title	Album details
The Box	Released: 2006; Label: Snapper Music; Formats: 3xCD; Limited release
1980–83	Released: 26 January 2015; Label: Anagram; Formats: 4xCD
Exploited Barmy Army	Released: 28 October 2016; Label: Westworld Recordings; Formats: 3xCD
The 7X7 Box	Released: 1 June 2018; Label: Rebellion; Formats: 6x7"; Netherlands-only release

== EPs ==
Title	EP details	Peak chart positions	
Title	EP details	UK	UK Indie
Army Life	Released: July 1980; Label: The Exploited Record Company; Formats: 7"	—	6
Exploited Barmy Army	Released: October 1980; Label: The Exploited Record Company; Formats: 7"	—	4
Dead Cities	Released: October 1981; Label: Secret; Formats: 7"	31	4
Don't Let 'Em Grind You Down	Released: November 1981; Label: Secret; Formats: 7"; Split EP with Anti-Pasti	70	1
Rival Leaders	Released: October 1983; Label: Pax; Formats: 7"	—	11
Jesus Is Dead	Released: September 1986; Label: Rough Justice; Formats: 12"	—	12
Archive4	Released: 1986; Label: Castle Communications; Formats: 12"; Limited release	—	—
War Now	Released: 1988; Label: Rough Justice; Formats: 12"	—	—
Punks Alive!	Released: 1988; Label: Skunx Recordings; Formats: 12"	—	—
"—" denotes releases that did not chart or were not released in that territory.

== Singles ==
Title	Year	Peak chart positions	
Title	Year	UK	UK Indie
"Dogs of War"	1981	63	2
"Dead Cities"	1981	31	4
"Attack"/"Alternative"	1982	50	5
"Computers Don't Blunder"	1982	—	—
"Race Against Time"/"Sex & Violence" (limited US-only release)	2007	—	—
"—" denotes releases that did not chart or were not released in that territory.

== Videos ==
=== Video albums ===
Title	Album details
Live at the Palm Cove	Released: 1983; Label: Jettisoundz Video; Formats: VHS
Sexual Favours	Released: August 1987; Label: Jettisoundz Video; Formats: VHS
Live in Japan	Released: September 1992; Label: Toy's Factory, Visionary Communications; Formats: VHS
1983–87	Released: 1992; Label: Jettisoundz Video; Formats: VHS
Rock & Roll Outlaws	Released: 22 May 1995; Label: Visionary Communications; Formats: VHS
Buenos Aires 93	Released: March 1996; Label: Visionary Communications; Formats: VHS
Beat 'Em All	Released: 4 October 2004; Label: Dream Catcher; Formats: DVD
Punks Not Dead – The Box Set	Released: 27 October 2008; Label: Cherry Red; Formats: 3xDVD

=== Music videos ===
Title	Year
"Troops of Tomorrow"	1982
"U.S.A."	1982
"Sexual Favours"	1987
"Beat the Bastards"	1996
"Never Sell Out"	2003
"Chaos Is My Life"	2003
"You're a Fucking Bastard"	2003
"Fuck The System"	2020
