= Cultural depictions of Margaret Thatcher =

Margaret Thatcher depicted in culture

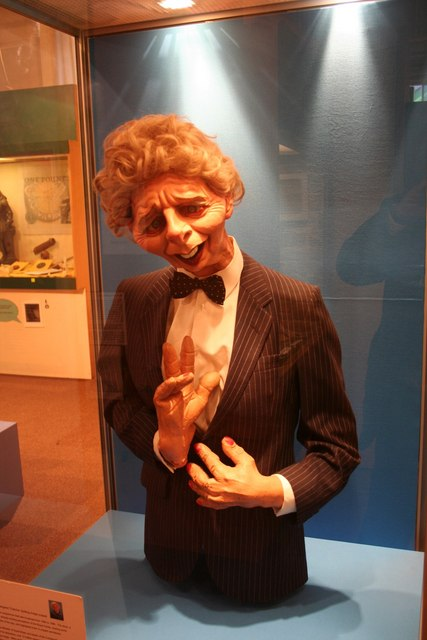
The Spitting Image Thatcher puppet on display in Grantham Museum

Margaret Thatcher was Prime Minister of the United Kingdom from 1979 to 1990. Her portrayal in the arts and popular culture has been mixed. In the words of one critic she attracted "musical opprobrium like no other British political leader". Such opinion is divergent from mainstream opinion polling which tends to place her as the most popular British prime minister since Winston Churchill.

Arts critic Michael Billington noted that "Thatcher may not have cared passionately about the arts, but she left her emphatic mark upon them."

This page is a list of depictions of Thatcher on stage, in film, TV, radio, literature, music and in other forms of the arts and entertainment.

== Film ==
- Reagan (2024) – Lesley-Anne Down
- El Conde (2023) – Stella Gonet
- The Iron Lady (2011) – Meryl Streep
- In Search of La Che (2011) – Steve Nallon
- Back in Business (2007) – Caroline Bernstein
- I Am Bob (2007) – Caroline Bernstein
- For Your Eyes Only (1981) – Janet Brown

== Television drama ==
- American Horror Story: 13 (2026) - Jessica Lange
- Brian and Maggie (2025) - Harriet Walter
- The Reckoning (2023) - Fenella Woolgar
- The Crown (2020) – Gillian Anderson
- When Harvey Met Bob (2010) – Ingrid Craigie
- The Queen (2009) – Lesley Manville
- Margaret (2009) – Lindsay Duncan
- The Long Walk to Finchley (2008) – Andrea Riseborough
- Coup! (2006) – Caroline Blakiston
- The Line of Beauty (2006) – Kika Markham
- Pinochet in Suburbia (2006) – Anna Massey
- The Alan Clark Diaries (2004) – Louise Gold
- The Falklands Play (2002) – Patricia Hodge
- Deutschlandspiel (2000) (TV) – Nicole Heesters
- The Final Cut (1995) – funeral and memorial statue depicted
- Thatcher: The Final Days (1991) – Sylvia Syms
- House of Cards (1990) – began after Thatcher's resignation, following the premiership of her fictional successor Hal Collingridge and his succession by Francis Urquhart.
- About Face (1989) – Maureen Lipman
- First Among Equals (Hilary Turner) (1986) – Paola Dionisotti

== Theatre ==
- Margaret Thatcher Queen of Soho (2013–present) – A drag comedy musical play imagining what life would have been like if Thatcher had got lost in Soho on the eve of the vote for Section 28. It was performed in December 2013 at Theatre503 in London, in August 2014 at the Edinburgh Fringe and is transferring to London once again in March 2015 at the Leicester Square Theatre.
- The Audience (2013) – played in the premiere production by Haydn Gwynne
- Handbagged (2010) – A play shown at the Tricycle Theatre in London as part of its Women, Power and Politics festival. Handbagged examined the relationship between Thatcher and the Queen. The younger Thatcher was portrayed by Claire Cox and the elder by Stella Gonet. Handbagged was later expanded by its writer Moira Buffini and presented as a full play at the Tricycle in late 2013. The director was Indhu Rubasingham.
- The Death of Margaret Thatcher (2008) – coffin is onstage throughout the play, dealing with the differing reactions of the cast towards her death
- Market Boy (2006) – Set in a marketplace in 1980s Romford, a character called "Posh Lady" is meant to resemble Thatcher. When the play debuted at the National Theatre in London, she was played by Nicola Blackwell.
- Thatcher – The Musical! (c. 2006)
- Billy Elliot the Musical (2005) – contains the irreverent song "Merry Christmas Maggie Thatcher" by Elton John
- Little Madam – a play by James Graham, exploring the life and career of Thatcher, presented at Finborough Theatre, London
- Sink the Belgrano! (1986) – a vitriolic satirical play by Steven Berkoff, in which she is called "Maggot Scratcher"

== Satire ==
- RuPaul's Drag Race UK (2019) – Drag Queen Baga Chipz appeared as Thatcher during the Snatch Game challenge of the first series of RuPaul's Drag Race UK. Chipz later resumed the role alongside fellow RuPaul's Drag Race UK contestant The Vivienne as Donald Trump in Morning T&T on WOW Presents Plus.
- Psychobitches (2012 - 2014) - Michelle Gomez
- Neocolonialism (2013) – Thatcher is quoted in the main menu, and sometimes appears as a computer player
- The Hunt for Tony Blair (2011) – Jennifer Saunders
- Jeffrey Archer: The Truth (2002) – Greta Scacchi
- The Comic Strip Presents... (1990, 1992) – Jennifer Saunders
- Dunrulin (1990) – Angela Thorne
- KYTV (1989) – Steve Nallon
- The True Confessions of Adrian Albert Mole – character Margaret Hilda Roberts, created as a satire by writer Sue Townsend
- Doctor Who: "The Happiness Patrol" (1988) – character of Helen A is a caricature of Thatcher
- The New Statesman (1987–90) – Steve Nallon
- Spitting Image (1984–96) – voiced by Steve Nallon; caricatured as a "fascist hermaphrodite: wearing power suits, using urinals and smoking cigars"
- Yes Minister (1984) – herself (a short sketch, on 20 January 1984, at an award ceremony for the writers, commemorated on a Private Eye cover)
- Are You Being Served? (1983) – In the episode "Monkey Business," a scene is set inside Number 10 with Thatcher appearing offscreen (only her hand is seen and her voice heard, portrayed by actress Jan Ravens) interacting with John Inman's character Mr Humphries
- Anyone for Denis? (1982) – Angela Thorne
- The Iron Lady (1979) – Janet Brown (satirical album written by John Wells of Private Eye)
- Saturday Night Live (1979, 1982, 1988, 2013) – Michael Palin; Mary Gross; John Lithgow; Fred Armisen, Taran Killam, Bill Hader, Jason Sudeikis, as Ian Rubbish and the Bizzaros

== Literature ==
- The Line of Beauty by Alan Hollinghurst (2004)
- Alan Clark Diaries: Volume 2: Into Politics 1972–1982 by Alan Clark (2000)
- Icon by Frederick Forsyth (1997)
- A Heart So White by Javier Marías (1995) – The hero of the novel is an interpreter at a long conversation between Thatcher and a Spanish politician. Thatcher refers to the play Macbeth, from which the novel's title derives.
- The Fist of God by Frederick Forsyth (1994)
- Alan Clark Diaries: Volume 1: In Power 1983–1992 by Alan Clark (1993)
- A Little Bit of Sunshine by Frederick Forsyth (1991)
- The Negotiator by Frederick Forsyth (1989)
- The Fourth Protocol by Frederick Forsyth (1984)
- First Among Equals by Jeffrey Archer (1984)
- The Devil's Alternative by Frederick Forsyth (1979), in which the character of British Prime Minister Joan Carpenter is based on Thatcher
- Miracleman: Olympus by Alan Moore and John Totleben (1989) – Thatcher is present as Miracleman explains that he and his companions will be restructuring the world economy; when she says that she could never allow this, he says "'Allow'?", and she is intimidated into silence.
- The Assassination of Margaret Thatcher – August 6, 1983 (2014) – a short story by Hilary Mantel
- The Iron Bird by Robert Woodshaw – a novel that takes the premise of Animal Farm and applies it to the life of Margaret Thatcher.

== Radio ==
- The News Huddlines – June Whitfield
- A Family Affair – Clare Higgins
- When Maggie Met Larry (2025) - Frances Barber

== Music ==
While in power, Thatcher was the subject of several songs which opposed her government, including The Beat's "Stand Down Margaret", as well as a sarcastic declaration of faux adoration (Notsensibles' "I'm in Love with Margaret Thatcher"). Even after she left government, several songs had been written that called for her death or looked forward to celebration of her death, including Morrissey's "Margaret on the Guillotine" ("The kind people have a wonderful dream, Margaret on the guillotine"), Elvis Costello's "Tramp the Dirt Down" ("I'll stand on your grave and tramp the dirt down"), Hefner's "The Day That Thatcher Dies" ("We will dance and sing all night") and Pete Wylie's "The Day That Margaret Thatcher Dies" ("She's gone!, And nobody cries"). In 2005, anarcho-punk band Chumbawamba recorded In Memoriam: Margaret Thatcher, which was available for pre-order on their website; copies were sent to purchasers on the day of Thatcher's death.

Songs with Thatcher as the subject include:

- "All My Trials" by Paul McCartney
- "Margaret on the Guillotine" (song from Morrissey's album Viva Hate)
- "Stand Down Margaret" by The Beat
- "The Day That Margaret Thatcher Dies" by Pete Wylie
- "The Day That Thatcher Dies" by Hefner
- "Tramp the Dirt Down" by Elvis Costello
- "I'm There!" by Janet Brown
- "Wallflowers" by MC Frontalot
- "Margaret" by Russian band Electroforez
- "Ronnie And Mags" by NOFX
- "Miss Maggie" by Renaud
- "Madame Medusa" by UB40
- "Maggie" by The Exploited
- "Dracumag" by Ewan MacColl
- "The Grocer" by Ewan MacColl
- "I'm in love with Margaret Thatcher" by Notsensibles (one of the more sympathetic depictions of Thatcher in popular music)
- "Maggie's Farm" by The Blues Band
- "Thatcher's Fortress" by The Varukers
- "Maggie Maggie Maggie (Out Out Out)" by The Larks
- "Margaret's Injection" by Kitchens of Distinction
- "Thatcher Fucked the Kids" by Frank Turner
- "Black Boys on Mopeds" by Sinéad O'Connor
- "Sowing the Seeds of Love" by Tears for Fears
- "How Many Lies" by Spandau Ballet
- "Bad Miss 'M'" by Danielle Dax
- "Eyes of Caligula" by The Sisters of Mercy

Roger Waters in 1983 referred to Thatcher sarcastically as "Maggie" multiple times throughout the Pink Floyd album The Final Cut. In the song "The Fletcher Memorial Home", Waters lists her as one of multiple "incurable tyrants and kings" interred at the titular asylum; in the closing line, he quietly speaks of applying the Final Solution to all of them. A sound recording of Thatcher's voice also appears on Waters' 1987 solo album Radio K.A.O.S. toward the end of the track "Four Minutes", when a portion of her speech to the 1983 Scottish Conservative Party Conference can be heard: "...our own independent nuclear deterrent, which has helped to keep the peace for nearly 40 years." The band Genesis in 1986 utilised a puppet representing her (as well as other politicians) in the music video "Land of Confusion" from the album Invisible Touch.

British indie band Carter the Unstoppable Sex Machine depicted Thatcher on the sleeve of their 1995 single "The Young Offender's Mum".

Thatcher is depicted on the album cover of Death Before Dishonour, a 1987 album by The Exploited, a Scottish punk rock band.

=== Protest songs ===
During her political career, Margaret Thatcher was the subject or the inspiration for several protest songs. Paul Weller was a founding member of Red Wedge collective, which unsuccessfully sought to oust Thatcher with the help of music. In 1987, they organised a comedy tour with British comedians Lenny Henry, Ben Elton, Robbie Coltrane, Harry Enfield and others.

=== Remixes ===
Less than two months after Thatcher resigned, musical acid house group V.I.M. released a rave track titled "Maggie's Last Party". Described by a music critic in 2011 as "strikingly original, and catchy to the point of irritation", the track was a "fusion" of Thatcher's "uncompromising speeches with a slowly-evolving post-acid house backing," would could be perceived as either "a fond farewell to the departing Iron PM, or a hearty 'good riddance'"; it reached #68 on the UK Singles Chart in January 1991. The track was a hit with many nightclubs at the time.

=== Silent disc ===
In 1983, a vinyl record was pressed entitled The Wit and Wisdom of Margaret Thatcher, however the whole groove on both sides are totally silent.

== Art ==
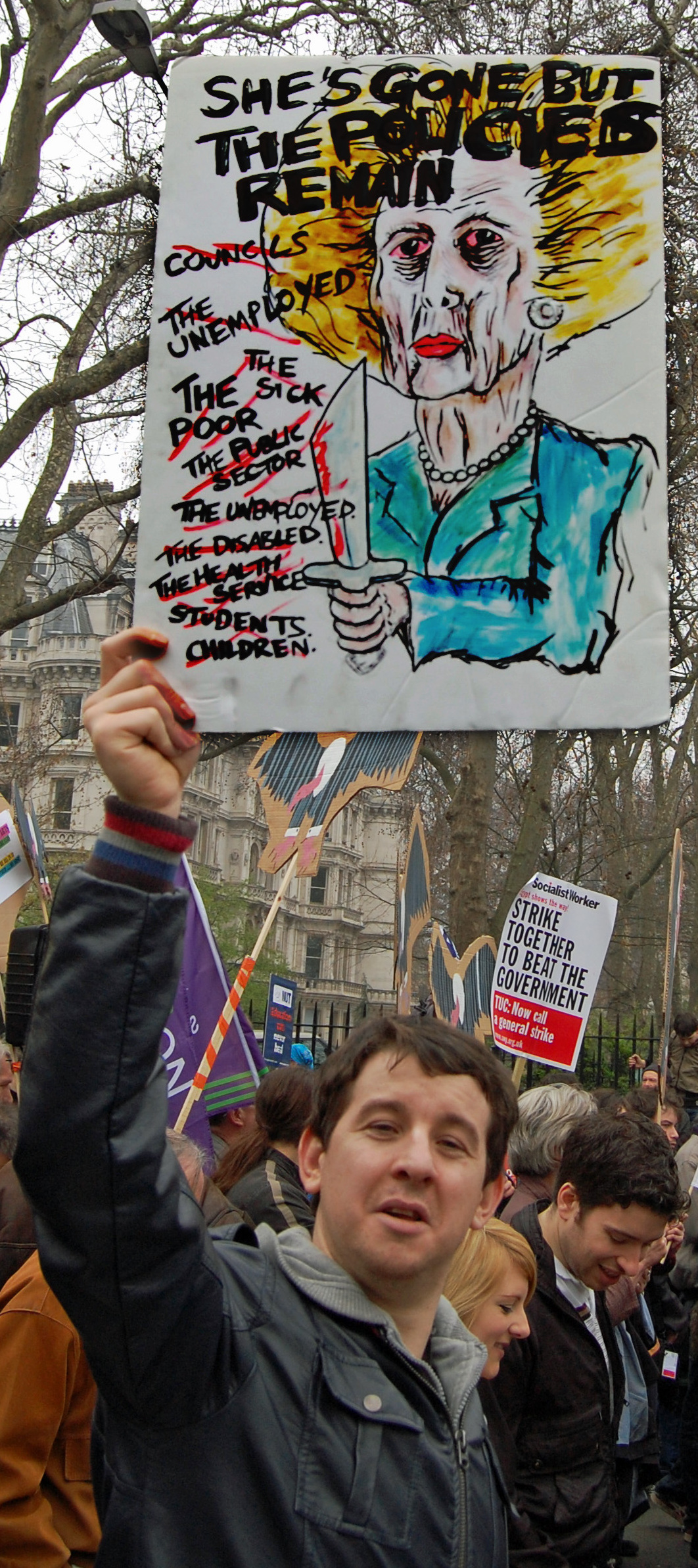
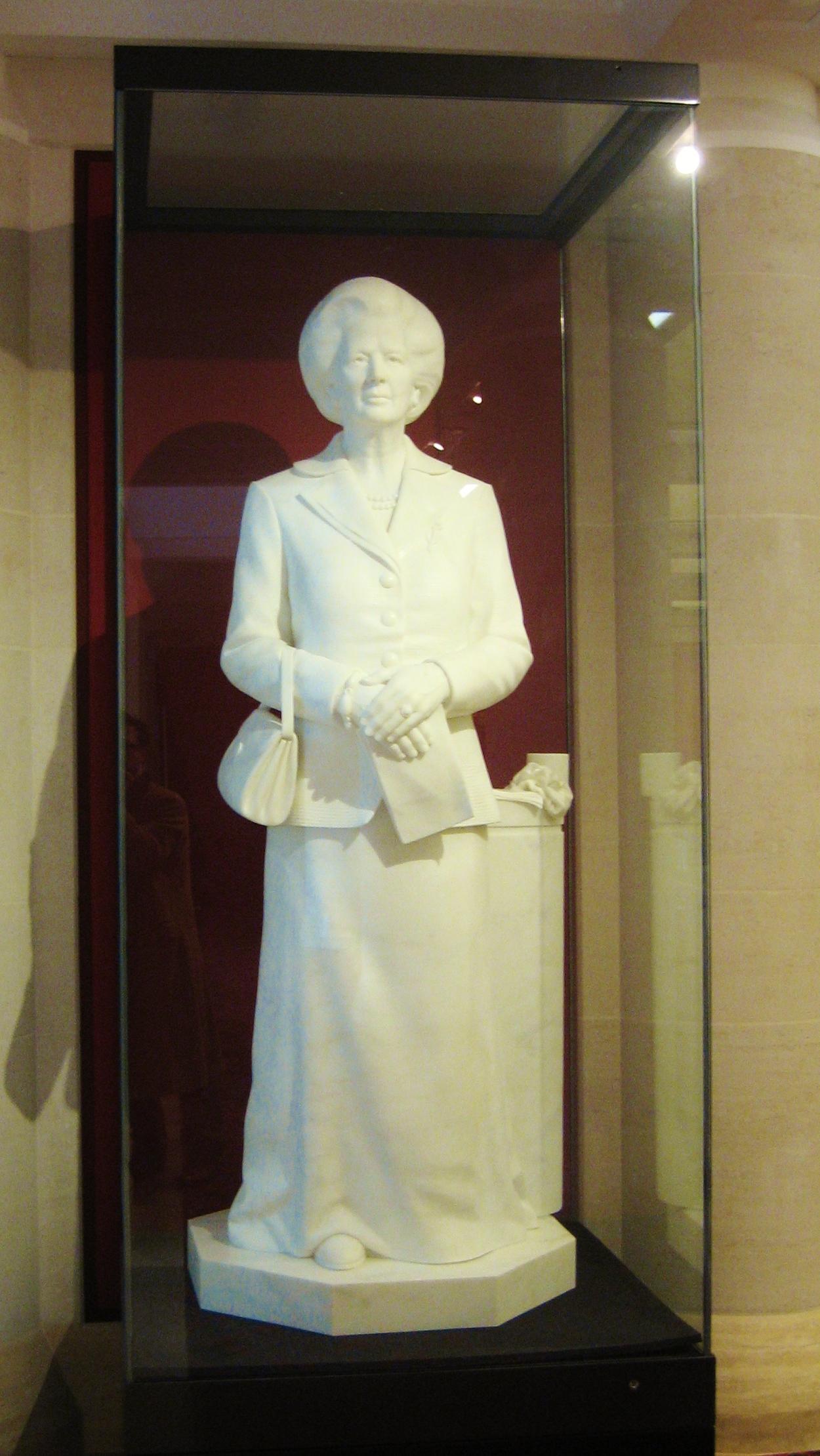
March for the Alternative, London, 26 March 2011 (left/above) and the rebuilt Thatcher statue at Guildhall Art Gallery (right/below)

Notable works include:

- Statue of Margaret Thatcher (1998) – a marble statue installed at Guildhall Art Gallery. The two-ton statue was decapitated in 2002 by a protester.
- Statue of Margaret Thatcher (2007) – a bronze statue. The statue has been erected inside the House of Commons. It shows her with her arm outstretched and posed as if addressing the House.
- Statue of Margaret Thatcher (2008) - a life sized bronze statue on Hillsdale College's campus, it is the only of her in North America.
- Statue of Margaret Thatcher (2022). On 15 May 2022 a bronze statue of Thatcher, 3 m (10 ft) high and placed on a 3 m (10 ft) high plinth, was unveiled without ceremony in her home town of Grantham. It was attacked with eggs within two hours. The work, by sculptor Douglas Jennings, was originally intended to stand close to the Houses of Parliament, but it was rejected by Westminster City Council in 2018 when councillors said it was too soon after her death (in 2013) and expressed fears that it would become a focus for "civil disobedience and vandalism".
- Maggie (2009) by Marcus Harvey – a black-and-white portrait composed of over 15,000 casts of sculptural objects including vegetables, dildos, masks and skulls. The work weighs over a ton.
- In the Sleep of Reason by Mark Wallinger – a video piece taken from Thatcher's 1982 Falklands speech and edited to show only each blink, thus giving the appearance that her eyes are constantly shut.
- Her First Year (1980) by Michael Leonard is a caricature for The Sunday Times depicting Margaret Thatcher as Joan of Arc based partly on Joan of Arc at the Coronation of Charles VII.

In May 1985, a portrait of Thatcher titled Welcome to Kuala Lumpur by artist Ruskin Spear was displayed at the preview of the Royal Academy's 217th Summer Exhibition at Burlington House, London. The artwork portrayed Thatcher with distinctive features, including squinting eyes, buck teeth, and a thick nose. Additionally, the painting featured another figure, bearing a resemblance to Malaysian Prime Minister Mahathir Mohamad, although the identity was not explicitly stated.

Thatcher was seen as a "gift" by political cartoonists. Among the most memorable images are Gerald Scarfe's provocative "scythe-like" caricatures, some of which were exhibited in his 2005 show "Milk Snatcher, Gerald Scarfe – The Thatcher Drawings".

== Video games ==
Thatcher's Techbase - A mod for Doom II in which the player is tasked with killing a demonic version of Thatcher who has risen from the dead.

== Maggie's Club ==
On Fulham Road in Chelsea, London, there is a 1980s-themed late-night bar dedicated to Thatcher called Maggie's Club.

== Football commentary ==
Thatcher was one of eight notable Britons cited in Norwegian Bjørge Lillelien's famous "Your boys took a hell of a beating" commentary at the end of England’s shock 2–1 defeat to Norway in September 1981. Beginning his exuberant celebrations with “We are best in the world! We have beaten England! England, birthplace of giants", he ended with, "Maggie Thatcher, can you hear me? Maggie Thatcher ... your boys took a hell of a beating! Your boys took a hell of a beating!"

== See also ==
- "Ding-Dong! The Witch Is Dead", a 1939 song that infamously charted in the week of her death
- "Maggie's Militant Tendency", a controversial programme broadcast by the BBC
- Thatchergate, a hoax perpetrated by members of the anarcho-punk band Crass
- Thatcher effect, an optical illusion first demonstrated on a photograph of Thatcher
