= List of awards and honours received by Margaret Thatcher =

List of honours awarded to Margaret Thatcher

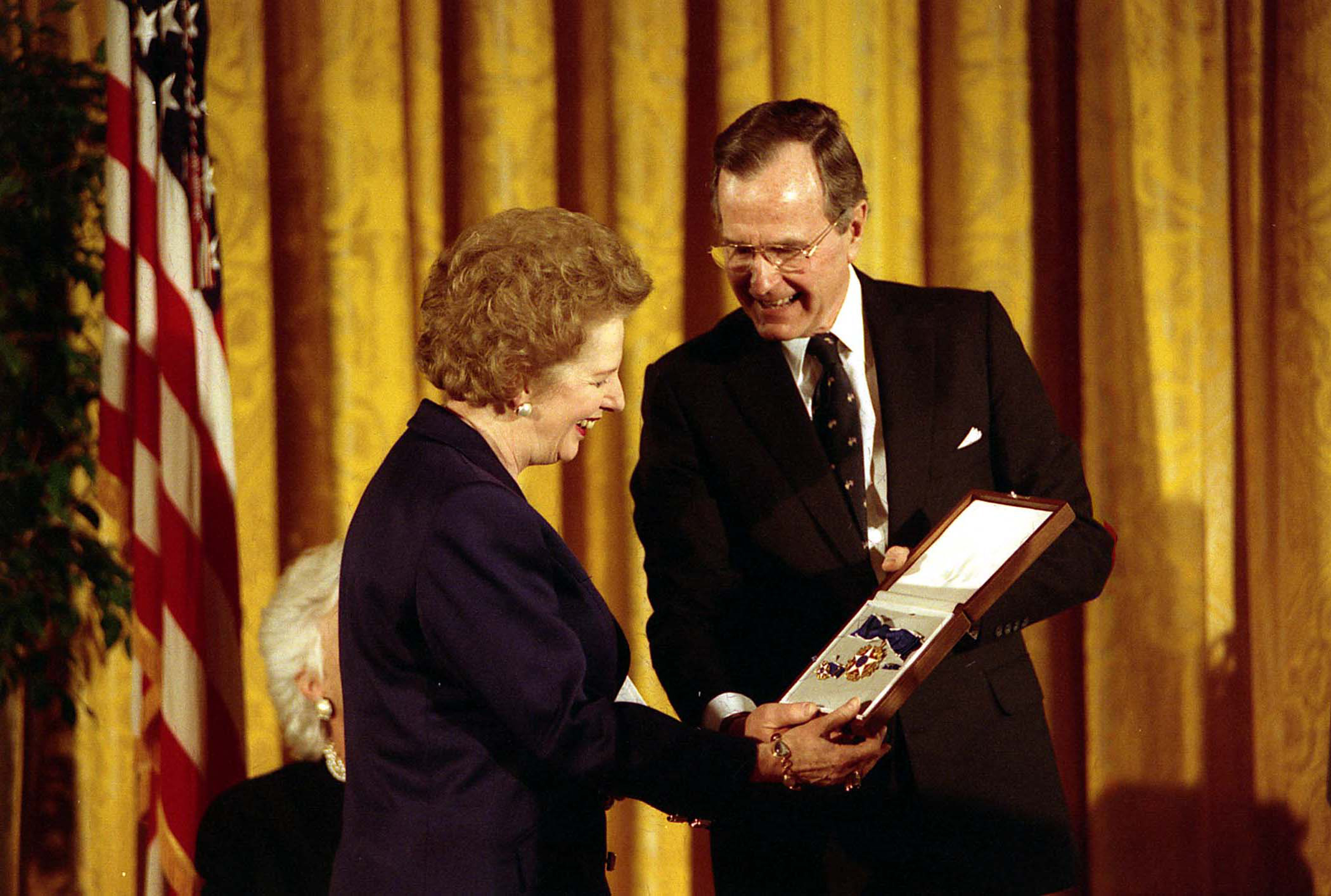
Margaret Thatcher receiving the Presidential Medal of Freedom in 1991

Margaret Thatcher received numerous honours in recognition of her career in politics. These included a peerage, membership of the Order of the Garter, the Order of Saint John and the Order of Merit, along with numerous other British and foreign honours. These included the Order of King Abdulaziz from Saudi Arabia in 1990. She was also honoured in Kuwait in 1991.

== Life peerage ==
Margaret Thatcher was given a life peerage on her standing down from the House of Commons at the 1992 general election. This allowed her a seat in the House of Lords. She took the title Baroness Thatcher, of Kesteven in the County of Lincolnshire. She sat with the Conservative Party benches.

== Coat of arms ==
As a member of the House of Lords with a life peerage, Thatcher was entitled to use a personal coat of arms. A second coat of arms was created following her appointment as Lady Companion of the Order of the Garter (LG) in 1995. Despite receiving her own arms, Thatcher sometimes used the Royal Arms instead of her own, contrary to protocol.

Coat of arms of Margaret Thatcher, Baroness Thatcher
Notes This achievement was used from 1995 to 2013, granted originally by the College of Arms in 1992 and was designed by the Garter King of Arms Sir Colin Cole. This version displays the circlet of the Order of the Garter. When she was appointed to the Order of the Garter in 1995 she was allowed to displayed a circlet of the order, she then used this new version until her death in 2013. Adopted 1992 Coronet surmounted by a baron's coronet Escutcheon On a lozenge per chevron azure and gules, a double key in chief between two lions combatant a tower with portcullis in base all or. Supporters Dexter: An Admiral of the British Royal Navy, pair of binoculars held on exterior arm; Sinister: Sir Isaac Newton holding in his exterior arm weighing scales, both proper. Motto CHERISH FREEDOM Orders: Garter ribbon; Merit ribbon with Cross pendant; HONI SOIT QUI MAL Y PENSE — French for "Shame be to him who thinks evil of it."; Banner The banner of Margaret Thatcher's arms used as knight of the Garter at St George's Chapel. Symbolism The dexter supporter is an Admiral of the Royal Navy, to commemorate the victory of the Falklands War during her premiership. The sinister supporter is Sir Isaac Newton, to recognise her earlier career as a scientist. The key and the two royal lions of England represents her tenure as Prime Minister and First Lord of the Treasury. The tower and portcullis represents her time at the Palace of Westminster as Member of Parliament. She bore this achievement on a lozenge (as is traditional for a woman), surrounded by the circlet of the Order of the Garter (in which she was appointed in 1995); below hangs the ribbon and insignia of the Order of Merit (in which she was appointed in 1990). Previous versions: 1992–1995 / Escutcheon 1995–2013

== Commonwealth honours ==
Commonwealth realms
Country	Date	Appointment	Post-nominal letters
United Kingdom	1970	Member of Her Majesty's Most Honourable Privy Council	PC
Commonwealth realms	7 December 1990	Member of the Order of Merit	OM
United Kingdom	1 July 1991	Dame of Justice of the Order of St John	DStJ
United Kingdom	25 April 1995	Lady Companion of the Order of the Garter	LG

== Foreign honours ==
Orders
Country	Date	Appointment	Ref.
United States	7 March 1991	Presidential Medal of Freedom	
South Africa	15 May 1991	Grand Cross of the Order of Good Hope	
Poland	3 October 1991	Honorary Citizenship of Kraków	
Japan	24 May 1995	Grand Cordon of the Order of the Precious Crown	
Poland	18 June 1996	Honorary Citizenship of the City of Poznań	
Croatia	15 September 1998	Grand Order of King Dimitar Zvonimir	
United States	28 October 1998	Ronald Reagan Freedom Award	
Czech Republic	17 November 1999	Order of the White Lion, First Class	
Poland	2000	Honorary Citizenship of the City of Gdańsk	
Kazakhstan	31 August 2001	Order of Friendship, First Class	
House of Bourbon-Two Sicilies	14 November 2003	Grand Cross of the Royal Order of Francis I Awarded on behalf of the Catholic Church by the House of Bourbon-Two Sicilies	
Lithuania	16 February 2008	Grand Cross of the Order of Vytautas the Great	

== Other distinctions ==
=== Scholastic ===
University degrees
Location	Date	School	Degree
England	1947	Somerville College, Oxford	Second-Class Honours Bachelor of Arts (BA) in Chemistry

Chancellor, visitor, governor, rector, and fellowships
Location	Date	School	Position
England	1970 – 8 April 2013	Somerville College, Oxford	Honorary Fellow
Virginia	1993–2000	College of William and Mary	Chancellor

Honorary degrees
Location	Date	School	Degree	Gave Commencement Address
District of Columbia	27 February 1981	Georgetown University	Doctor of Laws (LLD)	
England	1986	University of Buckingham	Doctor of Laws (LLD)	
Israel	17 November 1992	Weizmann Institute of Science	Doctorate	
Utah	5 March 1996	Brigham Young University	Doctor of Public Service (DPS)	
Virginia	2000	College of William and Mary	Doctor of Laws (LLD)	
California	2008	Pepperdine University	Doctorate	

=== Memberships and fellowships ===
Location	Date	Organisation	Position
United Kingdom	1975 – 8 April 2013	Carlton Club	Honorary Member
United Kingdom	24 October 1979 – 15 May 1980	Royal Institute of Chemistry	Honorary Fellow (Hon FRIC)
United Kingdom	15 May 1980 – 8 April 2013	Royal Society of Chemistry	Honorary Fellow (Hon FRIC)
United Kingdom	1 July 1983 – 8 April 2013	Royal Society	Fellow (FRS)
England	9 November 1983 – 8 April 2013	Gray's Inn	Honorary Bencher
Ontario	18 June 1988 – 8 April 2013	Law Society of Upper Canada	Honorary Bencher
United States	2006 – 8 April 2013	The Heritage Foundation	Patron

=== Magazines ===
In 2019, Time created 89 new covers to celebrate women of the year starting from 1920; it chose Thatcher for 1982.

== Freedom of the City ==
- (England) 6 February 1980: Barnet
- 10 January 1983: Falkland Islands
- 26 May 1989: London
- (England) 12 December 1990: Westminster
- 16 September 1998: Zagreb
- 11 November 2000: Gdańsk

== Awards ==
Location	Date	Organisation	Award
Virginia	28 February 1981	OSS Society	William J. Donovan Award
California	27 October 1998	Ronald Reagan Presidential Foundation	Ronald Reagan Freedom Award

== Places and other things named after Thatcher ==
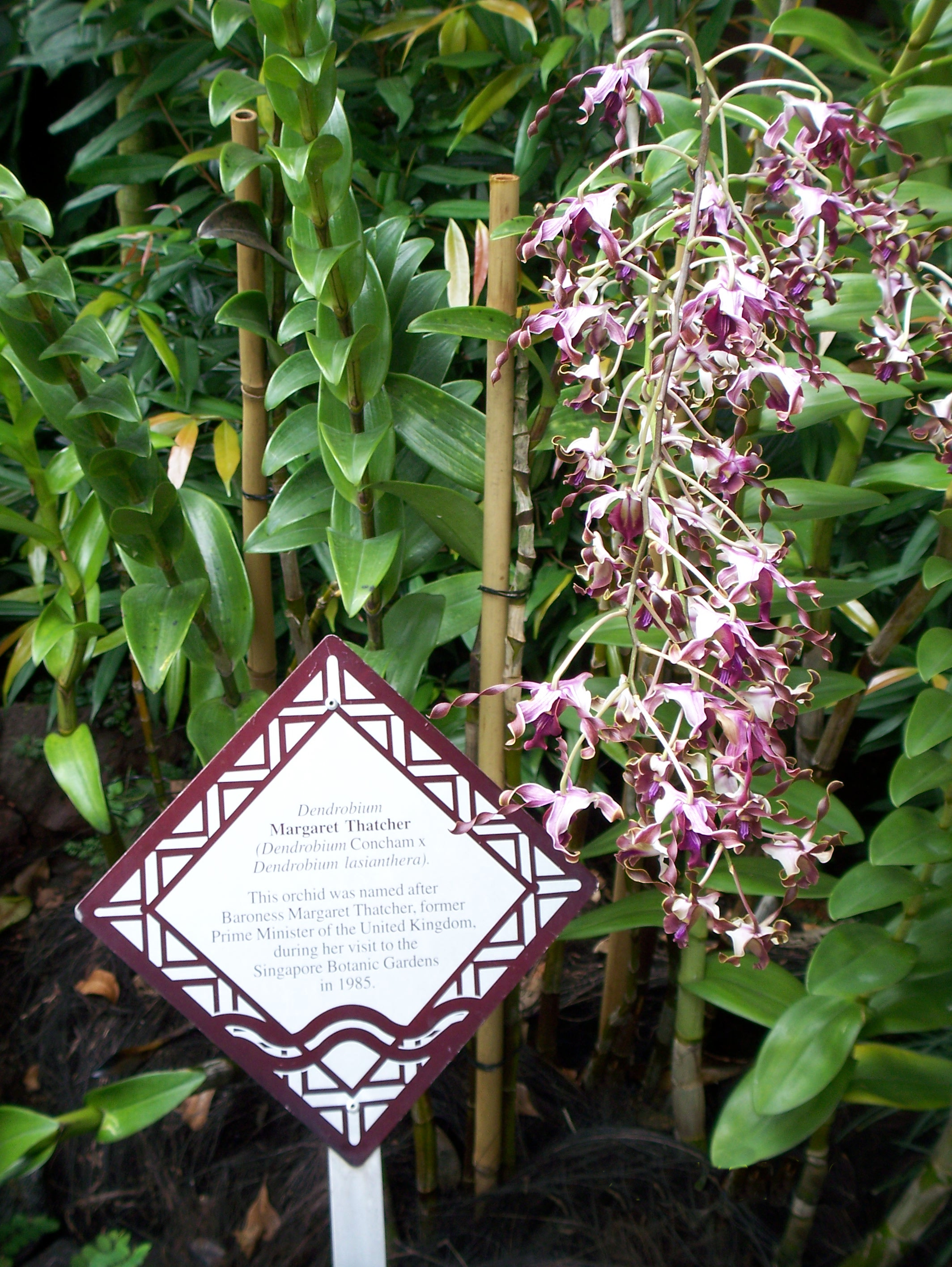
Dendrobium Margaret Thatcher, with explanatory plaque.

=== Places ===
- Armenia (Gyumri): Margaret Thatcher Street
- Australia (Waroona): Thatcher Street
- Falkland Islands (Stanley), Thatcher Drive
- South Georgia and the South Sandwich Islands: Thatcher Peninsula
- Spain:
  - Madrid: Margaret Thatcher Public School
  - Madrid: Plaza Margaret Thatcher
- United Kingdom:
  - Grantham: Roberts Hall in Kesteven and Grantham Girls' School
  - Kidderminster: Margaret Thatcher House (Regional Conservative Party Headquarters)
  - Somerville College, Oxford: Margaret Thatcher Centre
  - Chelsea: Margaret Thatcher Infirmary
  - Chelsea: Maggie's Club
  - West Drayton: Thatcher Close
- United States (Washington, D.C.): Margaret Thatcher Center for Freedom at The Heritage Foundation

=== Other things ===
- Falkland Islands: Margaret Thatcher Day
- United Kingdom: Thatcherism
- The orchid Dendrobium Margaret Thatcher
