= Death Before Dishonor =

Death Before Dishonor or Death Before Dishonour may refer to:

- Death Before Dishonor (album), the debut album by rapper 2 Pistols
- Death Before Dishonor (band), an American hardcore band from Boston, Massachusetts
- Death Before Dishonor (film), a 1987 American action film directed by Terry Leonard
- "Death Before Dishonor", a song from Five Finger Death Punch's 2007 album The Way of the Fist
- Death Before Dishonor, a 1989 album from Dennis Brown containing a song of the same name
- Death Before Dishonour, the fifth studio album by the Scottish punk band The Exploited
- ROH Death Before Dishonor, a professional wrestling event
- The unit crest of the US Army's 397th Regiment has Death Before Dishonor emblazoned on a banner at its base.
