= Thatcher – The Musical! =

Thatcher – The Musical! was a theatrical production staged by the Foursight Theatre concerning the life of the former British Prime Minister Margaret Thatcher.

== See also ==
- Cultural depictions of Margaret Thatcher
- Margaret Thatcher influence
