= Arena Theatre (disambiguation) =

Arena Theatre or Theater may refer to:

- Arena Theatre, one of the oldest theatres in Bratislava, Slovakia.
- Arena Theatre, another name for the Edison Theatre, New York City
- Arena Theater, Houston, Texas
- Arena Theatre Company, Bendigo, Australia
- Arena Theatre, Wolverhampton, England
