= Arena Theatre, Wolverhampton =

University theatre in Wolverhampton, England

Coordinates: 52°35′14.2″N 2°7′38.1″W

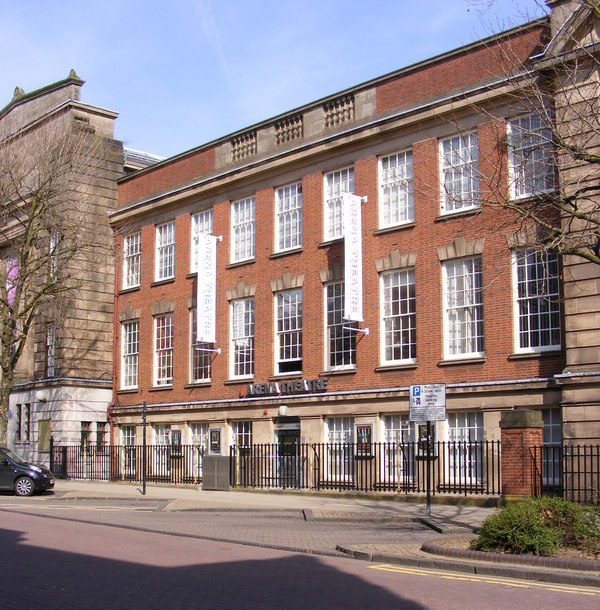
The theatre in 2010

The Arena Theatre is situated on Wulfruna Street in Wolverhampton and is part of the University of Wolverhampton's city campus. The venue's main auditorium seats 150 people and is used for both professional touring shows and for local community groups.

== History ==
In 1967, Philip Tilstone, the first lecturer in drama at the University of Wolverhampton, which was then the Wolverhampton College of Technology, wanted to establish the drama not just at the university, but in Wolverhampton, too. He was committed to providing a range of performance events for both students and the local community. Alongside his colleague, the late Dr. Percy Young, the director of music at the college, Tilstone gave music students the opportunity to perform, and these performance events would justify the provision of a fully equipped theatre/workshop venue, the Arena Theatre, with shared access for students and visiting performers. In 1989, Kevin O'Sullivan became the administrator for the Arena Theatre. He was subsequently the theatre manager until his retirement in 2013. Student work was frequently performed at the Arena Theatre and local audiences continued to benefit from the range and quality of its professional programming.

The Arena Theatre continued to act as an essential resource for drama and provided a first class performance venue for the region. Students from surrounding colleges and schools, members of local drama groups and arts organisations all made extensive use of the theatre. As well as being a successful venue in the local community, the Arena Theatre became a hotspot for touring theatre. Numerous prestigious companies touring shows to the Arena during this period included Kneehigh Theatre, Royal National Theatre, Royal Shakespeare Company, People Show, Tara Arts, Shared Experience, Forced Entertainment, Volcano, Hull Truck Theatre, Gay Sweatshop, Cheek by Jowl, Market Theatre (Johannesburg), Trestle Theatre, Complicité, Kathakali Dance, Black Theatre Co-operative, Red Shift Theatre, ATC Theatre, Snarling Beasties and The Right Size. In addition to these, the Arena Theatre welcomed local professional touring companies from the West Midlands, Foursight Theatre, Theatre Foundry and Pentabus. As well as these, there were dance performances, live art and music concerts.

After 20 years, the theatre had outgrown its cramped and inaccessible home, so with investment from the University of Wolverhampton and a grant from the National Lottery, an ambitious £2 million refurbishment began. Architects Marsh and Grochoski made use of the space available and the old gym was transformed into the Tilstone Studio.

== Current status ==
After 18 months of building work, the Arena Theatre re-opened in October 1999. With greatly improved facilities and access, the theatre was able to expand its programme of performances and the Arena Theatre now host in excess of 200 public performances per year – in addition to a host of other special events.
