= Troops of Tomorrow =

Studio album by The Exploited
- Released: 1982
- Genre: Street punk, hardcore punk
- Length: 37:50 (LP version)
- Label: Secret
- Producer: Tony Spath, The Exploited

The Exploited chronology
Punks Not Dead (1981)	Troops of Tomorrow (1982)	Let's Start a War (1983)

Troops of Tomorrow is the second album by Scottish punk rock band The Exploited, released in 1982 through Secret Records.

== Track listing ==
All songs written by Wattie Buchan and Big John Duncan, except where noted.

Side one

1. "Jimmy Boyle" – 2:07
2. "Daily News" – 2:57
3. "Disorder" – 2:18
4. "Alternative" (Buchan, Campbell, Duncan, Gary McCormack) – 2:04
5. "U.S.A." (Buchan, Duncan, McCormack) – 3:19
6. "Rapist" (Buchan, Campbell, Duncan, McCormack) – 1:27
7. "Troops of Tomorrow" (The Vibrators cover) – 4:54

Side two

1. "UK 82" – 2:47
2. "Sid Vicious Was Innocent" (Buchan, McCormack) – 2:57
3. "War" (Buchan, McCormack) – 3:47
4. "They Won't Stop" (Buchan, McCormack) – 2:18
5. "So Tragic" (Buchan, McCormack) – 1:48
6. "Germs" (Buchan, Duncan, McCormack) – 4:38

2001 reissue CD bonus tracks

1. "Attack" – 2:26
2. "Alternative" (single version) – 1:59
3. "Y.O.P." – 1:43
4. "Troops of Tomorrow" (The Vibrators cover) (12" version) – 3:10
5. "Computers Don't Blunder" – 2:33
6. "Addiction" – 1:40

== Critical reception ==
Professional ratings
Review scores
Source	Rating
AllMusic	4/5 stars

AllMusic called the album a classic of the hardcore punk genre and a landmark British punk rock album.

== Legacy ==
The album's sound influenced bands such as Agnostic Front and Stormtroopers of Death.

A medley of "War", "Disorder" and "UK 82", covered by Slayer and Ice-T is featured in the soundtrack for the 1993 film Judgement Night.

The chorus of "UK 82" was changed to "LA 92" to reflect the 1992 Los Angeles riots.

"UK 82" was also used as the opening and closing track to the 1983 film Made in Britain, starring Tim Roth.

In 2020, Mr. Bungle recorded a cover of "U.S.A." (which they titled simply "USA"). The track was the first time the band had recorded music since the 1999 album California.

== Personnel ==
The Exploited

- Wattie Buchan – vocals
- Big John Duncan – guitar
- Gary "Beaker" McCormack – bass
- Danny Heatley – drums

Production

- Ian "Buck" Murdock and Glenn Kingsmore (Defects) – backing vocals on "Germs"
- Ian Carnochan – composer
- Karyn Dunning – liner notes
- Mez Meredith and Scott Billett – photography
- Terry Oakes – illustrations
- Steve Roberts – drums (on all tracks except "Sid Vicious Was Innocent" and "Germs")
- Tim Turan – mastering
- Tim Smith – design
- Tony Spath – production and engineering
