= List of honorary citizens of Poznań =

Honorary Citizenship of the City of Poznań
- Coat of arms of Poznań
- Native name: Honorowe Obywatelstwo Miasta Poznania
- Awarded for: Exceptional contributions to Poland and Poznań
- Country: Poland
- Hosted by: Poznań City Council
- First award: 1885

The honorary citizenship of Poznań (Polish: Honorowe Obywatelstwo Miasta Poznania) is a list of people to whom the Poznan City Council has awarded ‘Honorary Citizenship of the City of Poznań – a special title awarded for exceptional services to Poland and Poznań. The honoured individuals receive a diploma, flowers and a statuette.

== Rules for the award ==
Historically, since the first award of 'Honorary Citizenship of the City of Poznań', the Poznań City Council has been responsible for honouring individuals. The first titles of ‘Honorary Citizenship of the City of Poznań’ after the restoration of democratic local government in Poland were awarded exclusively on the basis of Article 18(2)(14) of the Local Government Act. The local rules for granting 'Honorary Citizenship of the City of Poznań' were regulated by Resolution No. XXX/172/91 of the City Council of Poznań of the 1st term of office, dated 4 June 1991.

As stated in the resolution, this title was awarded by the Council by way of a resolution adopted at the request of the city councillors or the Mayor, by an absolute majority of votes and in the presence of at least two-thirds of the statutory composition of the Council. The Poznań City Council could also, by way of resolution, revoke honorary distinctions if it was found that the recipient had lost their honorary rights. These powers were amended by Resolution No. XIX/140/IV/2003 of the Poznań City Council of the 4th term of office, dated 3 June 2003.

Nomination provisions for requiring an absolute majority of votes and revoking the award were removed. The resolution added the power to submit honorary citizenship nominations by the Council committees upon notice to the councillors' clubs of Poznań City. Honorary awards are presented by the Chairman of the Council in the presence of the Mayor, usually at a ceremonial session of the City Council during the feast day of Poznań's patron saints, St. Peter and St. Paul. The City Council Office keeps records of the awards granted. The latest amendments to the rules for awarding distinctions were adopted by the Poznań City Council of the 5th term in Resolution No. LXXII/1000/V/2010 of 15 May 2010, stipulating that the distinction is awarded only to living persons and to no more than one person per year.

== List of recipients ==
=== Up to 1918 ===
On 11 June 1885, Hugo Ludwig von Below was granted honorary citizenship of the city of Poznań. This title was also held by Robert von Zedlitz-Trützschler, Richard von Seeckt, Richard Witting, Wilhelm von Waldow and Erich Ludendorff. The outbreak of World War I prompted the Poznań City Council, hoping to regain independence thanks to a possible victory of the German Empire, to award the title of "Honorary Citizen of the City of Poznań" to German Field Marshal Paul von Hindenburg, arguing "he saved Poznań and the provence from Russian invasion and devastation." The title awarded to the commander on 28 October 1914 was, however, revoked in 1919 as a result of actions taken after the Polish victory in the Greater Poland Uprising. The records of all honorary citizens of the city of Poznań appointed before 1 January 1919 were removed on the basis of a resolution passed by the municipal council on 29 June 1920.

=== Interwar period ===
The first recipient of ‘Honorary Citizen of the City of Poznań’ as Ignacy Jan Paderewski, who was awarded this title by the Poznań City Council by resolution of 21 January 1920.. The second honouree was Wojciech Trąmpczyński, who received his title on the basis of a resolution dated 28 September 1920.. After a fourteen-year hiatus in awarding distinctions, a resolution dated 25 April 1934 honoured the third and last person before World War II – Cyryl Ratajski.

List of laureates
Year	laureate
1920	Ignacy Jan Paderewski
1920	Wojciech Trąmpczyński
1934	Cyryl Ratajski

=== Post 1990 ===
In the post-war period, the title was not awarded for several decades. Since 1990, the title has been awarded to 39 individuals. No awards were given in four years: 1994, 1998, 1999 and 2002. In 1992 and 1996, the title was awarded not to one person (as is customary), but to three people, while in 2005, 2006 and 2009, it was awarded to two people. The only honoured persons from outside Poland were Margaret Thatcher and Árpád Göncz. Among those currently honoured are 13 women and 26 men.

List of laureates (since 1990)
Year	laureate	Justification
1990	Edward Raczyński	‘in recognition of his enormous contributions to Poznań and Greater Poland’
1991	Helena Przybyłek-Porębna	"paying tribute to the heroic attitude of Mrs Helena Przybyłek-Porębna during the memorable events of June 1956”
1992	Wiktor Dega	"in recognition of his overall scientific, research and educational work in the field of orthopaedics and physical rehabilitation of disabled persons, and for establishing a modern complex comprising a Rehabilitation Medicine Clinic and an Industrial Rehabilitation Centre, which is so closely associated with our city and with medical activities for the benefit of the city.”
1992	Zbigniew Zakrzewski	"in recognition of his overall scientific, research and educational work carried out during many years at the Poznań University of Economics, and in recognition of his role in promoting the history and monuments of our city, expressed in a series of books reminding our residents of their proud past.”
1992	Stefan Stuligrosz	"in recognition of the Professor's exceptional contribution to cultural activities in Poznań, in particular for organising and continuously directing, since 1939, the Poznań Nightingales Boys' and Men's Choir, which quickly gained recognition throughout the country and beyond, becoming the pride and symbol of our city”
1993	Janusz Ziółkowski	"in recognition of the Professor's outstanding local government, academic, social and political activities, his great contribution to the socio-political changes introduced in Poznań, our province and Poland since August 1980.”
1995	Stanisław Broniewski	"in recognition of his outstanding contribution to the struggle for Poland's liberation from Nazi occupation during World War II, as well as his great services to the Poznań scouting movement.”
1996	Margaret Thatcher	"in recognition of his outstanding personality and contributions to the development of British-Polish relations, and in particular to the promotion of market economy and economic education in Poznań.”
1996	Árpád Göncz	"in recognition of his outstanding personality and contributions to the development of democracy, on the anniversary of the Poznań June 1956 uprising and the 40th anniversary of the Hungarian Revolution.”
1996	Jerzy Stroba	"recognising the special contributions of the Metropolitan of Poznań to shaping the life of the city of Poznań and the region, as well as his enormous responsibility and pastoral support during a difficult period of socio-economic change.”
1997	Jan Paweł II	"in gratitude for his participation in the spiritual life of the residents of Poznań and his long-standing ties with the city, in recognition of his enormous moral and religious authority, as an expression of affection and respect.”
2000	Jan Nowak-Jeziorański	"in recognition of his outstanding personality and contributions to the development of democracy.”
2001	Wanda Błeńska	"in recognition of his long-standing and dedicated work among lepers in Africa.”
2003	Przemysław Bystrzycki	"expressing gratitude and recognition for his devoted service to the Fatherland, particularly during World War II – in the ranks of the Polish Army and the ‘silent-unseen’ soldiers of the Home Army, as well as for his exceptional contributions to the intellectual and social life of our city.”
2004	Gerard Labuda	"expressing appreciation for his great scientific achievements, enormous contribution to research into Polish history, care for patriotic education of academic youth, and recognising his exceptional services to the development of the Poznań scientific community and his dignified attitude as a scholar.”
2005	Marian Żelazek	"expressing gratitude, appreciation and deep respect for outstanding humanitarian work dedicated to the value of human life and dignity, and to helping the sick and poor, especially lepers in India.”
2005	Karol Pospieszalski	„expressing great admiration for his research achievements, respect for his steadfast attitude as a scholar and patriot, a member of underground organisations during the German occupation who devoted his entire life to his homeland, appreciating his exceptional contribution to uncovering the truth about the contemporary history of Poland, and in particular its Western Territories”
2006	Zenon Grocholewski	"expressing appreciation and deep respect for outstanding public and scientific activity, particularly in the field of legal sciences.”
2006	Włodzimierz Gedymin	"expressing appreciation for effective actions on 2 September 1939 in defence of the airspace over Poznań and for persistent and valiant service in defence of the Fatherland during World War II.”
2007	Jan Góra	"expressing appreciation and deep gratitude for 30 years of pastoral and educational work with Poznań's youth and students, as well as promoting Poznań in Poland and Europe.”
2008	Stanisław Barańczak	"expressing great appreciation for outstanding literary and scientific achievements and deep respect for noble conduct during difficult years in our history.”
2009	Lech Wałęsa	"expressing the highest appreciation for outstanding achievements in the democratic reconstruction of the Polish State and deep respect for the dedication and consistency shown during the pivotal years of our history.”
2009	Tadeusz Mazowiecki	"expressing the highest appreciation for outstanding achievements in the democratic reconstruction of the Polish State and deep respect for the dedication and consistency shown during the pivotal years of our history.”
2010	Teresa Rabska	"in recognition of his academic achievements, with particular emphasis on his work towards the restoration of local government in Poland and the development of civil society.”
2011	Lech Trzeciakowski	"expressing appreciation for his academic achievements, with particular emphasis on research into the history of Greater Poland and Poznań, and recognising his contributions to the education of young academics.”
2012	Hanna Suchocka	"expressing the highest appreciation for his contributions to the development of the independent Republic of Poland and deep respect for his attitude towards life, embodying patriotism and traditional Greater Poland values.”
2013	Izabella Cywińska	"in recognition of outstanding achievements and contributions to the City of Poznań and national culture.”
2014	Andrzej Legocki	"expressing appreciation for scientific achievements and recognising contributions to the development of the Poznań scientific community, with particular emphasis on activities for the Polish Academy of Sciences.”
2015	Agnieszka Duczmal	"in recognition of outstanding musical achievements, with particular emphasis on the work of the Polish Radio Chamber Orchestra ‘Amadeus’, and in appreciation of its contribution to shaping the artistic image of Poznań.”
2016	Jan Węglarz	"expressing recognition for outstanding scientific achievements and appreciating contributions to the development of Polish science, with particular emphasis on activities aimed at building an information society.”
2017	Hanna Kóčka-Krenz	"in recognition of outstanding scientific achievements in the field of archaeology and early medieval history, with particular emphasis on research work on Ostrów Tumski in Poznań and the discovery of the residence of the first Piasts.”
2018	Ryszard Krynicki	"expressing appreciation for outstanding literary and editorial achievements and deep respect for steadfastness during difficult years in our history.”
2019	Andrzej Wituski	"in recognition of contributions to the development of the City of Poznań, with particular emphasis on achievements in the field of culture and art.”
2020	Maria Siemionow	"in recognition of scientific and teaching achievements in the field of medical sciences, with particular emphasis on outstanding achievements in the field of transplantology.”
2021	Teresa Zarzeczańska-Różańska	"in recognition of contributions to the development of sport and youth education, as well as sporting achievements, with particular emphasis on achievements in long-distance swimming.”
2022	Wojciech Łączkowski	"in recognition of his many years of work for the development of democracy and his academic and teaching achievements in the field of law and finance.”
2023	Andżelika Borys	"expressing appreciation for many years of dedicated work in defence of democracy, human rights and freedom of speech, as well as actions taken in defence of Polish culture in Belarus.”
2024	Jadwiga Rotnicka	"in recognition of his scientific and teaching achievements, as well as his commitment to building a self-governing and democratic Poland.”
2025	Maria Krzyżańska	„expressing appreciation for the commitment to the struggle for the independence of the Republic of Poland and recognising the work done to foster patriotic attitudes and the memory of the steadfast spirit of the Home Army soldiers in the younger generation”
