= Wattie Buchan =

Scottish punk rock singer

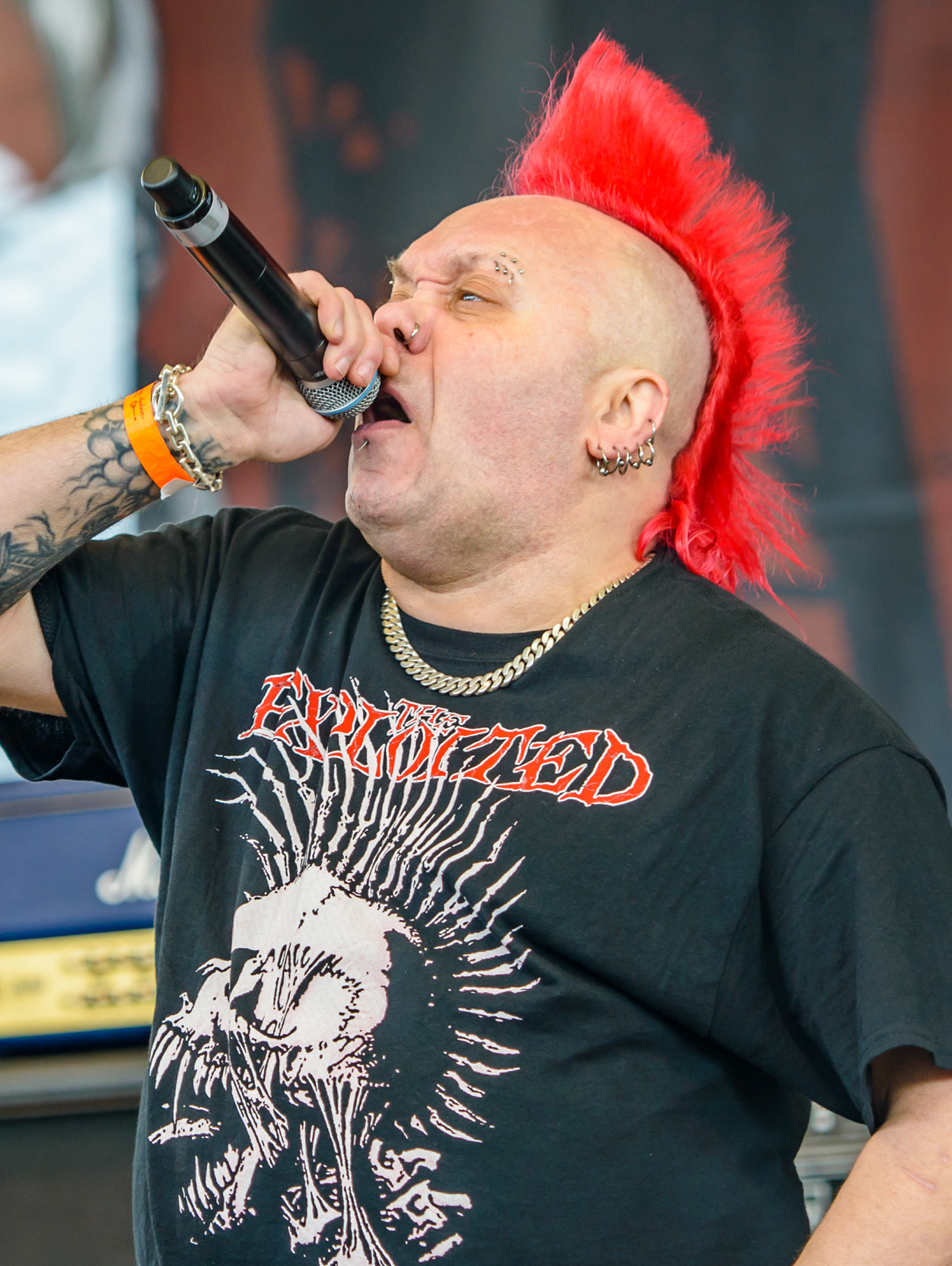
- Buchan with The Exploited in 2016

Background information
- Born: Walter David Buchan; 24 July 1957 (age 69); Edinburgh, Scotland
- Genres: Oi!; street punk; hardcore punk; crossover thrash
- Occupation: Singer
- Years active: 1979–present
- Member of: The Exploited

Walter David "Wattie" Buchan (born 24 July 1957) is a Scottish punk rock singer, best known as the lead vocalist for the Exploited.

== Early life ==
Buchan was born in Edinburgh on 24 July 1957. He served in the British Army as a soldier prior to joining the Exploited. He became interested in punk rock in the 1970s after hearing music by bands such as the Sex Pistols.

== Career ==
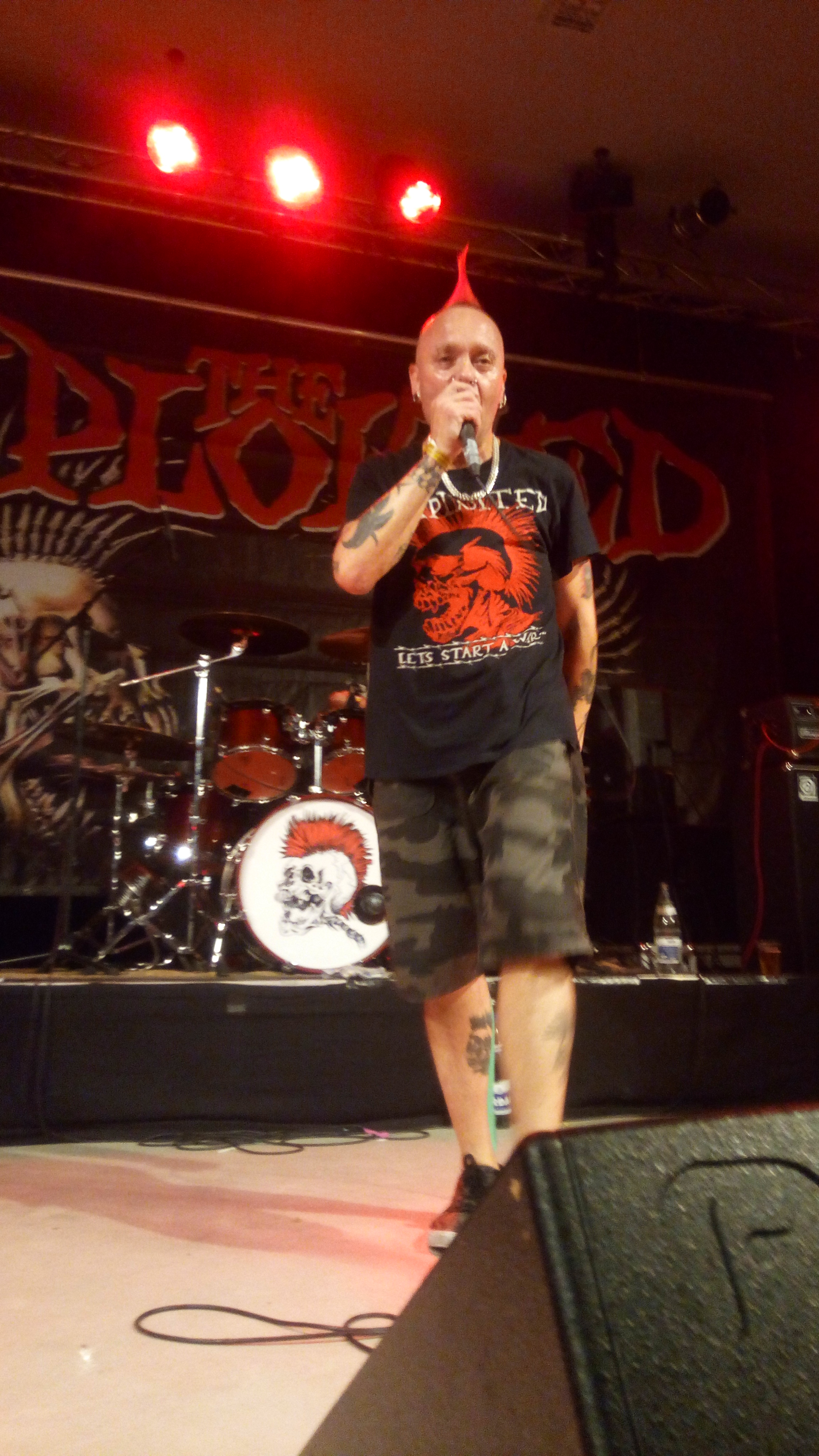
Buchan performing in 2018

The Exploited are a Scottish punk rock band from the second wave of UK punk, formed in 1978. Originally playing styles such as street punk and oi!, the band played styles such as crossover thrash later on. Formed in Edinburgh by Wattie's younger brother Terry Buchan, they signed to Secret Records in March 1981 and released their debut EP Army Life. The album Punks Not Dead followed in the same year, which hit No. 1 on the UK Independent Chart and No. 20 on the UK National Chart. Their sophomore album Troops of Tomorrow was their highest ever charting album in the UK, peaking at number 17. Despite many changes in personnel, the band has continued into the present day, and has developed a worldwide following.

== Personal life ==
Buchan is married to Gena Buchan.

=== Health ===
In February 2014, Buchan suffered a heart attack on stage in Lisbon, Portugal. The Exploited had been touring with Hatebreed and Napalm Death. He was admitted to S. José Hospital in Lisbon after the show and later moved to S. Marta Hospital to recover and undergo heart surgery. The Exploited cancelled the remainder of the Tour Of Chaos 2014 due to Buchan's condition. On 29 June 2014, the Exploited's Facebook page provided an update on Buchan's condition, saying that after a successful heart operation, the band was practising new material.

In an interview with Rock Hard Magazine in May 2016, he said that he had suffered from depression, which was affecting his ability to write new lyrics.

=== Views and beliefs ===
Buchan openly hates politics. He also hates religion. When asked about religion, Buchan said, "I fuckin' hate religion. For me everyone's free to believe in something. Just because you believe in some of it, doesn't mean that you…but I can't understand people that care about religion more than anything else. I am like 'What? What the fuck?!?' I just hate religion." Buchan is an anarchist. Buchan has condemned several politicians, including George W. Bush, Margaret Thatcher, and Tony Blair. Buchan said about Thatcher: "She was a bit of a cunt, but at least she was honest". The Exploited's song "Maggie" is about Thatcher. In the song "Maggie"'s lyrics, Buchan calls Thatcher a "cunt". Buchan has said that Blair "is a total fucking, lying fanny wank." Buchan has criticized George W. Bush for the Iraq war that began in 2003. Buchan said: "It's unbelievable, these people have got so much power, and they start all these wars. Everybody sees that, but nobody does anything to stop that."

Buchan is pro-Palestine and has condemned Israel's treatment of the Palestinians. In an interview with I Probably Hate Your Band, Buchan expressed his pro-Palestinian views, saying: "even with Israel and Palestine, the Palestinian people are like prisoners and the world does nothing about it because America's behind them, backing them because they want bases for their airplanes in that area." One of the songs The Exploited has worked on during the 2010s is a song called "My TV", which Buchan says "is about watching the news with Israel bombing Palestine and politicians being greedy cunts." Buchan has also criticized the foreign policy of both the United States and Britain. Buchan said:

A lot of the problems have been made between Britain and America. Like Iraq, fucking Libya ... it's all to do with oil. All to do with fucking oil. Now Gaddafi's away, fucking Saddam Hussein's away, and it's just like the people that live there just live a life of misery … even with Israel and Palestine, the Palestinian people are like prisoners and the world does nothing about it because America's behind them, backing them because they want bases for their airplanes in that area. And I find that really sad, that all the problems with terrorism, I think, because if someone killed my family then I'd want revenge. You've got hundreds and thousands of these civilians getting killed, thousands and thousands of people getting killed and it's like, if someone killed my family, I'd want revenge. And a lot of it's just to do with oil. And then ISIS, America gave them their fucking weapons in the first place. America and Britain gave them all weapons because it suits them, and when it doesn't suit them they're fucking terrorists. It's fucking shit, man.

== Feuds with other musicians ==
Buchan is known for criticizing and starting feuds with other musicians. The Exploited's Punks Not Dead album's title is a reaction to anarcho punk contemporaries Crass' song "Punk is Dead". Buchan has been open about disliking Crass, saying: "People listen to bands and believe what they sing about. Crass was just words." He stated "they were full of shit. They said they believed in this and that, but bought record companies under other people's names so it couldn't be traced back to them. It was all about money with them." Other than Crass, Buchan has criticized multiple other bands and musicians including Henry Rollins, Jello Biafra, Green Day, Bad Religion, Linkin Park, The Offspring, and Descendents. Buchan has also criticized the emo genre, saying "Emo's shit! They can stick it up their ass!" Buchan accused the punk rock band the Buzzcocks of selling out. Buchan said about the Buzzcocks: "They used to be good but they really sold out. A lot of the bands here used to be good until they turned to more pop rock. Like when I was a punk (when I was young), I used to see the Buzzcocks live. It was great." When the Exploited were at Amnesia Rockfest, Buchan, during an interview, criticized the other bands at the music festival, saying: "Well, here at Rockfest, you got a lot of bands that define themselves as punk bands but they're shit. They are so pop-oriented that they don't even stand for any values; they do not deserve the status of being defined as punk bands."

Buchan has been known for openly disliking former Dead Kennedys member Jello Biafra. On the album Live at the White House, he introduces the song with an insult to Biafra and claims that he slept with his wife. On the same album, he dedicates the song "Wankers" to the artist Pushead, who claimed that he was neither paid nor credited for his work with the band, and the song "Daily News" to Maximumrocknroll. When asked in a documentary why he disliked Biafra, Buchan said that he could not remember. In May 2016, Buchan also criticised Slayer for refusing to allow the Exploited to appear on stage with them after the Exploited had allowed Slayer to cover [collaborating with Ice-T] three of their songs for the Judgment Night soundtrack for only a small payment. Buchan was asked which bands he liked after he criticised several other acts appearing at Amnesia Rockfest. Buchan responded by mentioning Charged GBH, Carcass, No Fun at All, Skinny Puppy, and Ministry. He also said of Slayer: "Slayer's okay. I mean, only some of their stuff is okay. I'll restrain myself from saying anything more about them." Buchan said about Real McKenzies: "I don't feel any special political bond with them – my brother, the drummer of the band, is a lot more conscious of Scottish politics. However, I've played with them a few times; they're total alcoholics. Good people: their gigs are always excitin'."

=== Feud with Conflict ===
After the appearance by the Exploited on Top of the Pops to perform "Dead Cities" in 1981, the hardcore punk band Conflict criticized the decision to appear on the programme with the song "Exploitation". This began a long-standing feud between the Exploited and Conflict, which divided the punk community and caused occasional clashes between the bands' fans (known as The Barmy Army for the Exploited and the Conflict Crew).

=== Feud with Green Day ===
At an awards ceremony for a music magazine, Buchan was presenting an award that was won by Green Day, a band that Buchan hates. He alleged that during the after-party Green Day member Billie Joe Armstrong confronted him and said, "When you die, I'm going to be standing over your grave, and piss on it." Buchan said he then responded to Armstrong, saying: "I've got something you'll never have, mate. You could have a big record company and loads of money but I've got something you'll never have, and that's respect from the punks. You cannot buy that, you have to earn it." The two then had to be separated by onlookers.

== Discography with The Exploited ==
=== Studio albums ===
- Punks Not Dead (1981)
- Troops of Tomorrow (1982)
- Let's Start a War... (Said Maggie One Day) (1983)
- Horror Epics (1985)
- Death Before Dishonour (1987)
- The Massacre (1990)
- Beat the Bastards (1996)
- Fuck the System (2003)

=== Live albums ===
- On Stage (1981)
- Live at the Whitehouse (1986)
- Live in Japan (1991)

=== Compilation albums ===
- Totally Exploited (1984)
- Singles Collection (1991)
- Twenty Five Years of Anarchy and Chaos (2004)
- Complete Punk Singles Collection (2005)

=== Split albums ===
- Don't Let 'Em Grind You Down (with Anti-Pasti) (1981)

=== EPs ===
- "Army Life" (1980)
- "Barmy Army" (1980)
- "Dead Cities" (1981)
- "Rival Leaders" (1983)
- "Jesus Is Dead" (1986)
- "War Now" (1988)

=== Singles ===
- "Army Life" (1980)
- "Exploited Barmy Army" (1980)
- "Dogs of War" (1981)
- "Dead Cities" (1981)
- "Attack/Alternative" (1982)
- "Computers Don't Blunder" (1982)

=== Videography ===
- Alive at Leeds (1983)
- Sexual Favours (1987)
- Live in Japan (1993)
- Rock and Roll Outlaws (1995)
- Beat 'Em All (2004)

=== Music videos ===
- "Troops of Tomorrow" (1982)
- "U.S.A." (1982)
- "Sexual Favours" (1987)
- "Beat the Bastards" (1996)
- "Never Sell Out" (2003)
- "Chaos is My Life" (2003)
- "You're a Fucking Bastard" (2003)
