= Thatchergate =

Hoax audio recording by punk band Crass

Thatchergate was the colloquial title of a hoax perpetrated by members of the anarcho-punk band Crass during the aftermath of the 1982 Falklands War. Using excerpts from speeches by Prime Minister of the United Kingdom Margaret Thatcher and President of the United States Ronald Reagan, a recording was spliced together which purported to be a telephone conversation between the two leaders. During the course of the tape, Reagan seems to state his intention to use Europe as a battle front to show the Soviet leaders the US's resolve in a nuclear conflict, whilst Thatcher appears to imply that HMS Sheffield was deliberately sacrificed to escalate the Falklands War.

When the recording first surfaced into the public domain in 1983, the United States Department of State considered it to be propaganda produced by the Soviet KGB, a story reported by both the San Francisco Chronicle and The Sunday Times. However, coverage of the tape by the UK broadsheet The Observer in January 1984 identified the true source as Crass. Crass have stated that great care was taken to ensure their anonymity, and that to this day it is a mystery as to how Observer journalists traced the hoax back to them.

In January 2014, official government documents were released to the National Archives revealing the concerns of the UK's Secret Intelligence Service (MI6). A Foreign Office adviser's letter to Thatcher said: "This looks like a rather clumsy operation. We have no evidence so far about who is responsible. ...SIS doubt whether this is a Soviet operation. It is possible that one of the Argentine intelligence services might have been behind it; or alternatively it might be the work of left-wing groups in this country."

Excerpts of the recording can be heard in the Crass track "Powerless with a Guitar" on the compilation LP Devastate to Liberate (Yangki - 1985 - Yangki 1). The full recording was later released on the expanded Crassical Collection edition of the group's best of album Best Before 1984.

== See also ==
- Cultural depictions of Margaret Thatcher
