= Fuck the System =

2003 album by The Exploited

Studio album by The Exploited
- Released: February 17, 2003
- Studio: Chapel Studios (Lincolnshire, England)
- Genre: Hardcore punk; crossover thrash
- Length: 34:13
- Label: Dream Catcher; Spitfire
- Producer: Russ Russell; Simon Efemey

The Exploited chronology
Beat the Bastards (1996)	Fuck the System (2003)

Professional ratings
Review scores
Source	Rating
AllMusic	4/5 stars
laut.de	4/5 stars
RockHard	10/10

Fuck the System (known as F@#k the System in the clean version) is the eighth studio album by Scottish hardcore punk band The Exploited. It was released on 17 February 2003 through Dream Catcher Records in the UK and Spitfire Records in the US. Recording sessions took place at Chapel Studios in Lincolnshire, England. Production was handled by Russ Russell and Simon Efemey. It is the only album to feature guitarist Robbie Davidson and bassist Mikie Jacobs and, as of 2024, the band's most recent project to date.

In Europe, the album debuted at number 81 in Germany and number 123 in France. Fuck the System was reissued in 2014 via Nuclear Blast.

== Track listing ==
All tracks are written by Wattie Buchan, except for track 7 written with John Duncan.

No.	Title	Length
1.	"Fuck the System"	4:15
2.	"Fucking Liar"	2:34
3.	"Holiday in the Sun"	2:24
4.	"You're a Fucking Bastard"	2:38
5.	"Lie to Me"	2:16
6.	"There Is No Point"	2:05
7.	"Never Sell Out"	2:35
8.	"Noize Annoys"	2:06
9.	"I Never Changed"	1:58
10.	"Why Are You Doing This to Me"	2:25
11.	"Chaos Is My Life"	2:11
12.	"Violent Society"	2:14
13.	"Was It Me"	4:32
Total length:		34:13

== Personnel ==
- Walter "Wattie" Buchan – vocals
- Robbie "Steed" Davidson – guitar
- Mikie Jacobs – bass
- Willie Buchan – drums
- "Risky Russ" Russell – producer
- Simon Efemey – producer

== Charts ==
Chart (2003)	Peak position
French Albums (SNEP)	123
German Albums (Offizielle Top 100)	81
