= The Massacre (The Exploited album) =

Studio album by The Exploited
- Released: 1990
- Recorded: Slaughterhouse
- Genre: Crossover thrash
- Length: 43:51
- Label: Rough Justice
- Producer: Wattie Buchan, Colin Richardson

The Exploited chronology
| Death Before Dishonour (1987) | The Massacre (1990) | Beat the Bastards (1996) |

Professional ratings
Review scores
| Source | Rating |
|---|---|
| AllMusic | 2/5 stars |

The Massacre is the sixth studio album by Scottish hardcore punk band The Exploited, released in 1990 through Rough Justice. It is the second crossover thrash album by The Exploited and is the band's most successful album so far.

The intro was taken from the 1978 movie Faces of Death.

== Track listing ==
All songs written by Wattie Buchan, except for where noted.

1. "The Massacre" (Buchan, Campbell, Duncan, McCormack) – 3:03
2. "Sick Bastard" – 4:05
3. "Porno Slut" – 3:15
4. "Now I'm Dead" – 3:45
5. "Boys in Blue" – 3:58
6. "Dog Soldier" – 3:05
7. "Don't Pay the Poll Tax" – 4:25
8. "Fuck Religion" – 3:12
9. "About to Die" (Buchan, Campbell, Duncan, McCormack) – 3:30
10. "Blown Out of the Sky" – 4:21
11. "Police Shit" – 3:54
12. "Stop the Slaughter" – 3:40

2014 reissue bonus tracks

1. "Barry Prossitt" – 3:53
2. "Don't Really Care" – 3:19
3. "Power Struggle" – 3:39
4. "Scaling the Derry Wall" – 4:06

== Personnel ==
The Exploited

- Wattie Buchan – vocals
- Gogs – guitar
- Smeeks – bass, vocals
- Tony – drums

with:

- The Driffield Lager Louts – backing vocals
- Engineered by Colin Richardson
- Produced by Wattie Buchan
- Illustration by Terry Oakes
