= Neocolonialism (video game) =

2013 video game

- The player "sampedestal" observes the vote distribution in India, in the Investment Phase of Turn 8.
- Developer: Subaltern Games
- Platforms: Windows, macOS, Linux
- Release: 4 November 2013
- Genre: Strategic game
- Modes: Single-player, multiplayer

Neocolonialism is a strategic computer game in which players take over different regions all over the world. It is turn-based, and allows three to six players at once. It is produced by American indie studio Subaltern Games, and designed by Esther Alter.

As in Risk, the world is divided into a number of different regions that players try to dominate. Unlike Risk, however, the goal is not to occupy as many regions as possible, but to liquidate the votes players have purchased in regions in order to put as much money as possible in a Swiss bank account. The game lasts for twelve turns. At the end of the twelfth turn, the player who has the most money in their bank account is the winner. Also, Neocolonialism differs from Risk in that the map of the world is rotated 180° in relation to the most common world map orientation, putting the north at the bottom.

In the introductory tutorial, the player is told, "You will learn the basics of how to ruin the world." Later the player is warned, "Neocolonialism is a game about finance bankers attempting to extract as much wealth from the world as possible."

== Gameplay ==
The game is played using the mouse alone; the keyboard is not used except when chatting with other players in multi-player mode.

Three to six people can play at once. The world is divided into eleven regions: Australia, Southeast Asia, Central Asia, India, Russia, Middle East, Africa, Europe, South America, Central America, and North America. Each region has ten "units" of voters that the players can purchase.

Each player starts with fifteen units of currency, symbolized by the character "¤". There are three phases to each turn: investment, policy, and IMF (International Monetary Fund).

- Investment Phase – the players take turns buying and selling government votes. On bottom center of the page there are options to buy, sell, or pass. Each region has ten "units" of voters that can be purchased. The price for a voting unit of each region is listed in the bottom-right panel. This price can fluctuate; the price of region's voting unit is determined by the mines, factories, and free trade agreements that currently make that region profitable (or unprofitable).
- Policy Phase – the players manipulate regional parliaments. A player can tell their voting units whom to vote for in an election; propose to build mines or factories, or to establish Free Trade Agreements; or vote on the proposals made by the other players. When three or more voting units have been purchased in a single region, the region elects a prime minister. The prime minister of a region can propose a policy, but the policy cannot go into effect until it is ratified in the next turn (and sometimes the other voters of the region will vote against it). A policy will not generate money for players until it has been ratified. A Prime Minister also has the option of liquidating their own votes and sending the money to a secret Swiss Bank account. A Prime Minister has a three-term limit before re-election.
- IMF Phase – the players observe and/or intervene in response to tragedies in different regions. These events are usually problems with the economy (such as a mine collapse), and they often result in a reduced value for each unit of votes in that region.

At the beginning of each turn, players can receive money, which they use to buy votes. However, a player will only receive money if they have bought votes in a region that has a Prime Minister. In every region where there is a Prime Minister, a player will receive an amount of money equal to 1/3 of how much that player's voting units are currently worth in that region. For instance, if Player 1 owns six voting units in Europe, and voting units in Europe are currently worth nine units of currency, then Player 1 will receive eighteen (six times nine, divided by three) units of currency.

A player only receives money at the beginning of a turn if the player owns votes. Therefore, if a player liquidates their votes, that player loses a source of income.

The vote distribution for a region is listed in the bottom-left corner of the screen. On the top-right corner is the "data" button, which shows where other players have purchased their votes. When three or more of a region's voting units have been bought, and all of them belong to a single player, the player is called a "dictator" and the region becomes a "dictatorship". Sometimes in a dictatorship, a coup occurs. A coup overturns the government, and causes the former-dictator to lose all of their votes. The player's money is not returned or refunded after the coup.

At the end of twelve turns, the player with the most money in their Swiss Bank account is the winner. An announcement is made—"The world has been ruined"—followed by the players and their scores. The number of voting units left on the map is irrelevant to the final scores.

== Development ==
Esther Alter first got the idea in September 2011, when she was playing German-style board games with friends in Boston. A friend jokingly wondered how to make a board game "based solely on the Marxist theory of neocolonialism—in which developed-world institutions control developing-world countries by purely financial means." A few months later, Alter reported her progress on the game so far, on a blog, with her screenname "sampedestal": "Neocolonialism is a complex cocktail of background financial and political decisions conjured by a global potpourri of rich people. It's far more subtle than its ancestral waves of colonialism were." Later that month she wrote:

I have designed Neocolonialism to make some pretty significant approximations of what in reality is an exceedingly complicated system. Each region, for example, has only ten sovereign bonds, which players can buy or sell. It is a simple system that in no way reflects how sovereign bonds function at a technical, legal level, but it does reflect how they are wielded by finance capitalists as a kind of tool or weapon against their peers (and also the rest of the world).

During the stages of development, Alter showed the developing versions of the game to various people who were interested, and she received a great deal of feedback. Esther Alter requested donations for supporting herself while working on the game, stating in a video, "If you donate, you'll have a chance to take over the whole world."

A version called "Neocolonialism 1.0" was released in November 2013, and was made available for purchase online.

== Reception ==
During its development and through its release, Neocolonialism has received mostly positive reception. Alter herself observed:

I got overly positive feedback from the people that saw the game. Perhaps the most interesting conversation I had was with a lady about why I chose to make a serious game that forces players to be the antagonists rather than the 'good guys' in the world. My response, which I hadn't quite formulated until I was in the middle of saying it, was that first, the idea of someone playing 'hero' to save the world is a very problematic paradigm; and second, because playing 'hero' is mostly wishful thinking.

Rock, Paper, Shotgun wrote that "it seems very smart" and predicted that a game will "spin out into a world of dodgy dealings, with players ... making secret deals to get themselves into power, collaborating in their political policies, and looking to exploit the cheap labour of the developing world as much as possible". IndieGames.com called it a "[b]rilliantly nasty imperialism simulator". PC Gamer called it "DEFCON with a bail-out instead of a bomb. Your job is to do as much harm as possible to the world, all in the name of your growing Swiss bank account ... If the life of a heartless hyper-capitalist monster appeals, you can back Neocolonialism at its Kickstarter page."

Hardcore Gamer observed:

Grand Theft Auto may let you go nuts in a city or even a state, but for a truly large-scale bout of pure psychopathy you'll want to manipulate global markets. NeoColonialism puts you in the shoes of a banker treating the world as your own personal financial piñata, and you won't stop beating it until every last penny is hammered out and all that's left is a sad little pile of confetti.

The Boston Globe wrote:

It's one part Marxism, one part global economic collapse. While this looks to be a complex game that will take some careful work from Subaltern to pull off, it's hard to turn down the chance to be a powerful, amoral, behind-the-scenes conspirator and exploiter. For a couple hours, at least.

After Neocolonialism 1.0 was released, Kill Screen called the game "partisan and derisive", a game that "someone might generate after reading Das Kapital and The Jungle". The review quarreled with the game's implication that every player is essentially "a villain", and that the game's creator "wants to paint wealth and its accumulation as inherently negative, and in a lot of ways [she] succeeds". Nevertheless, Kill Screen praised the game itself: "Alter's desire to portray a specific point of view cannot overpower the dynamic inherent in what [she] has crafted."
