= Big John Duncan =

Scottish guitarist

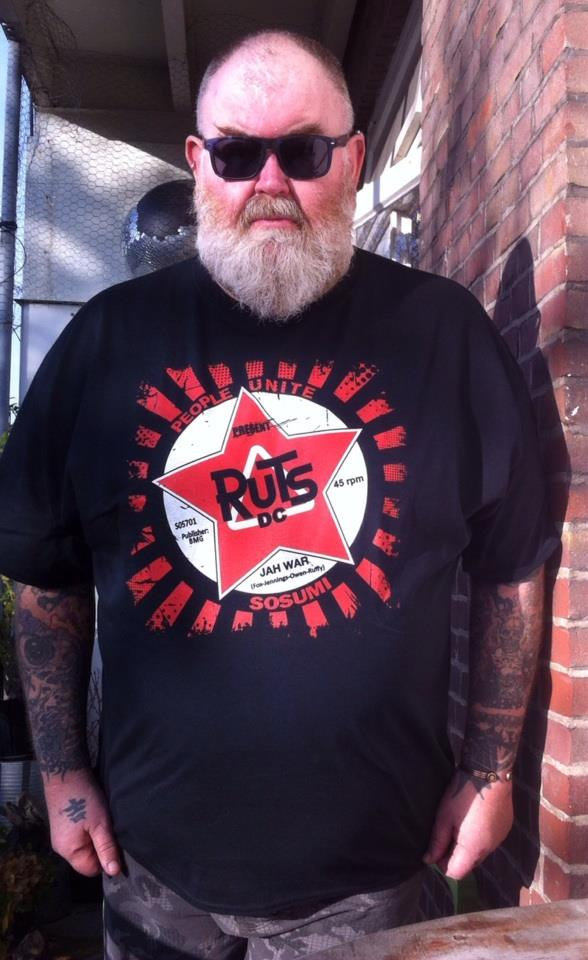
- Duncan in 2016

Background information
- Born: John Duncan; 14 August 1958 (age 68); Glasgow, Scotland
- Genres: Street punk, punk rock
- Occupation: Musician
- Instrument: Guitar
- Formerly of: The Exploited

John Duncan (born 14 August 1958), better known as Big John Duncan, is a Scottish musician who was the guitarist for the punk band The Exploited during their classic lineup from 1979 to 1984. He played and wrote the music for their albums Punks Not Dead, Troops Of Tomorrow and Let's Start a War. He also played and wrote many of their single releases, the most famous being "Dead Cities" which they performed on Top of the Pops in 1981.

After their American tour in 1983, Duncan quit The Exploited. He then went on to play in several bands including Human Zoo, Crazy Maybe, and Blood Uncles, and then in 1988 joined Goodbye Mr Mackenzie (with future Garbage singer Shirley Manson). In 1992 and 1993 he worked as a backline and guitar technician for the band Nirvana and played guitar with them during their concert in Roseland Ballroom, New York City on 23 July 1993. In the early and mid '90s he played with The Kamikaze Freak Show and the Gin Goblins.

In 2019, he joined with remaining bandmates for a Goodbye Mr Mackenzie 30th anniversary reunion tour.

Duncan worked with many other bands during his career, including Twisted Sister, the Foo Fighters and Ministry.
