= Horror Epics =

Studio album by The Exploited
- Released: 15 April 1985; 2004 (reissue)
- Recorded: Yard Studios, London, England
- Genre: Hardcore punk, street punk
- Length: 47:02
- Label: Taang!, Konexion, Captain Oi! (reissue)
- Producer: Wattie Buchan, Phil Chilton

The Exploited chronology
Let's Start a War (1983)	Horror Epics (1985)	Death Before Dishonour (1987)

Horror Epics is the fourth studio album by Scottish punk rock band The Exploited, released in 1985. It was reissued on Captain Oi! Records in 2004.

== Track listing ==
All tracks written by Wattie Buchan and Wayne Tyas, unless otherwise stated

Side one

1. "Horror Epics" – 5:04
2. "Don't Forget the Chaos" (Buchan) – 3:05
3. "Law and Order" – 2:52
4. "I Hate You" (Buchan) – 1:38
5. "No More Idols" – 4:55
6. "Maggie" – 2:35

Side two

1. "Dangerous Visions" – 3:35
2. "Down Below" – 4:18
3. "Treat You Like Shit" – 3:38
4. "Forty Odd Years Ago" – 2:56
5. "My Life" – 5:39

=== CD reissue bonus tracks ===
12. "Race Against Time" – 4:21
13. "Propaganda" – 2:26

== Personnel ==
The Exploited

- Wattie Buchan — vocals
- Karl Morris — guitar
- Wayne Tyas — bass
- Wullie Buchan — drums

Additional personnel

- Phil Chilton — producer
- John Ravenhall — engineer
- Scott Billet — photographist
- Brian Burrows — designer
- Mark Brennan — liner notes
