= The Exploited =

Scottish punk rock band

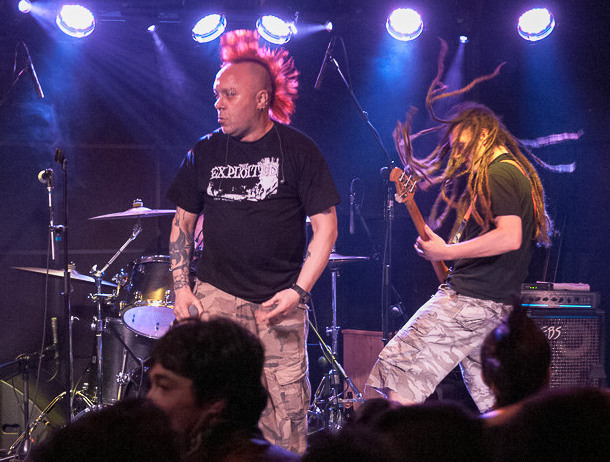
- The Exploited in 2014

Background information
- Origin: Edinburgh, Scotland
- Genres: Street punk; oi!; hardcore punk; crossover thrash; punk rock (early)
- Works: Discography
- Years active: 1978–present
- Labels: Nuclear Blast; Secret; Rough Justice; Captain Oi!; Cleopatra; Exploited
- Members: Wattie Buchan; Gary gman Sullivan; Irish Bob (Robert Halkett); Steve Campbell
- Past members: See timeline
- Website: the-exploited.net

The Exploited are a Scottish punk rock band formed in Edinburgh in 1978 by Stevie Ross and Terry Buchan, with Buchan soon replaced with his brother, Wattie Buchan. They signed to Secret Records in March 1981, and their debut EP, Army Life, and debut album, Punks Not Dead, were released that year. The band maintained a cult following in the 1980s among hardcore working class punks and skinheads. Originally a street punk band, the Exploited evolved into crossover thrash with their album Death Before Dishonour in 1987.

Although the Exploited continue to perform live, they have not released studio material since their 2003 album Fuck the System. Their songs have been covered by Slayer and others. Despite numerous lineup changes, Wattie has remained the Exploited's singer and leader.

== Career ==
=== Formation and early days (1979–1980) ===
The original line-up consisted of Terry Buchan (vocals), Stevie Ross (guitar), Colin Erskine (bass) and Andy McNiven (drums). After a few gigs in and around Edinburgh, Stevie Ross left following an appearance in Aberdeen supporting the UK Subs.

Stevie Ross was briefly replaced by guitarist Stevey Hay (Hayboy), who died on 14 July 2013 after a successful career as a blues musician. Guitar duties were then taken over by Big John Duncan.

Stevie Ross continues to write songs and, in addition to solo performances, he also plays in The Station Road Band.

=== Early releases and Punk's Not Dead (1980–1981) ===
"Punks Not Dead" (1981)
A sample of The Exploited's song "Punks Not Dead" from their album of the same name

Influenced by 1970s punk rock music, such as that by the Sex Pistols, the quartet developed a straightforward, no-frills sound characterised by speed and aggression. In 1980, the group founded their own independent record label, Exploited Records, and released their debut EP Army Life, which ranked #6 in the Indie/Independent charts for eight weeks and remained in the Top 20 for eighteen months. The B-side was titled Fuck the Mods / Crashed Out, and the record's back cover featured the message, "To all the Edinburgh punks and skins - keep on mod-bashing!!".

They then released another single, "Barmy Army", which ascended the independent charts and remained there for 53 weeks, peaking at #4. Their single "Dead Cities" reached #31 on the UK Charts. Their single "Exploited Barmy Army" peaked at #4 on the Independent/Indie chart.

In March 1981, the band signed to Secret Records and spent a month recording their debut album, Punks Not Dead. The Exploited released the single "Dogs of War", which peaked at #2 on the Independent charts and #63 on the UK Charts. Also in 1981, the band released their first live album, On Stage, recorded during a concert in Edinburgh. Subsequently, the band toured with Discharge, Anti-Nowhere League, Anti-Pasti and Chron Gen on a tour titled Apocalypse Now, which was recorded and released as a live album. Their album Punks Not Dead, released in April 1981, reached #20 in May, and then climbed to number 1 on the Independent Charts. During this period, the Exploited appeared on the popular mainstream TV programme, Top of the Pops. Many fans of the Exploited were unhappy with the band's decision to appear on the show. The hardcore punk band Conflict wrote the song "Exploitation" about this appearance, which led to a long-standing rivalry between Conflict and the Exploited, dividing the punk fan base.

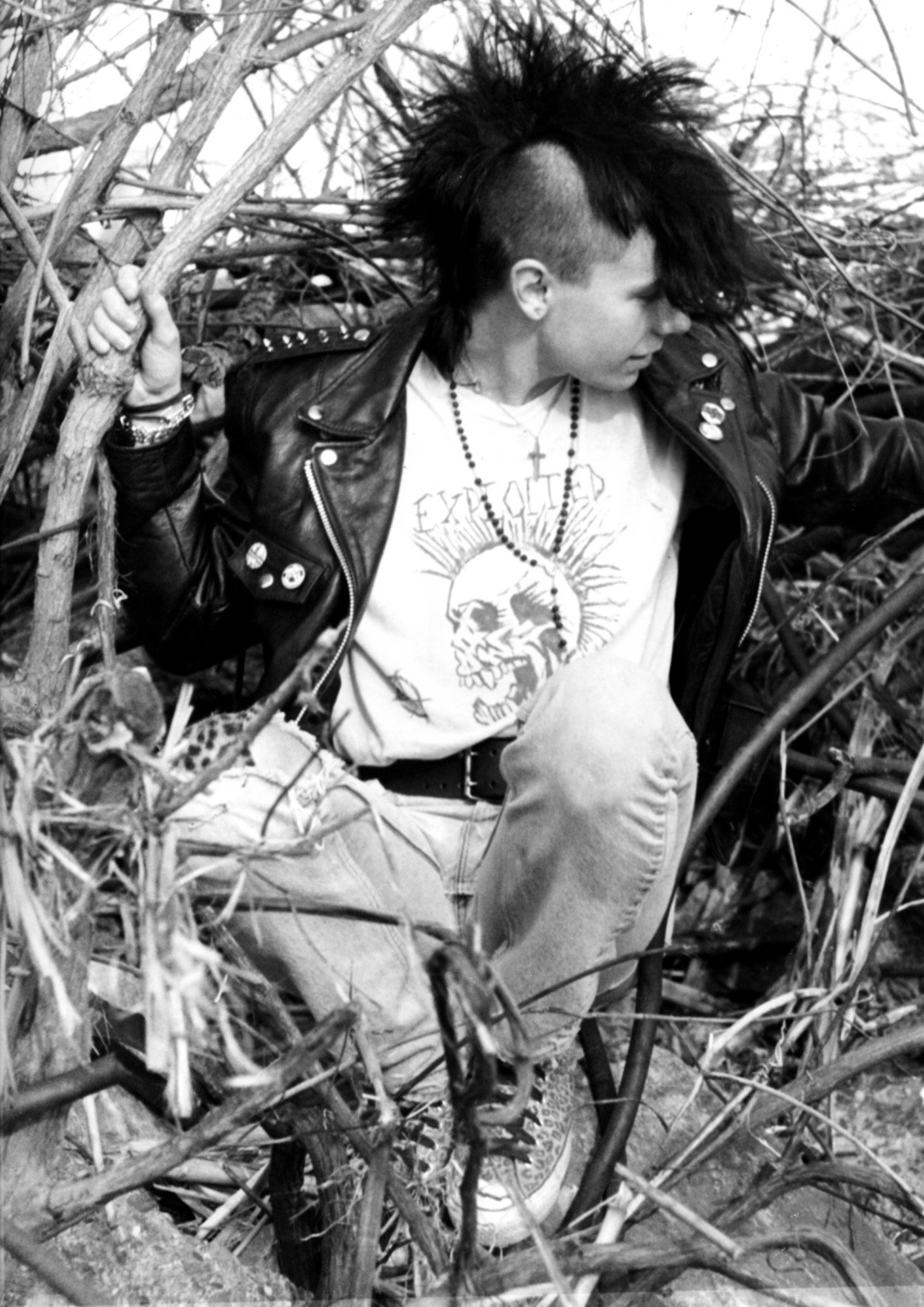
A young punk wearing an Exploited T-shirt in 1984

=== Troops of Tomorrow, Let's Start a War, and Horror Epics (1982–1986) ===
The band released the albums Troops of Tomorrow in 1982, Let's Start a War in 1983 and Horror Epics in 1985. The period between these albums was marked by severe discord over the band's musical direction: guitarist Big John Duncan and bassist Gary McCormack both left to form new bands—"bands with disco beats and guitar solos, total shit", in Wattie's words—and the band experienced a rapid succession of drummers, one of whom allegedly left after a "nervous breakdown". The band was driven away from the Secret label by new management who demanded unrealistic changes in style and personnel. Their next label, a small enterprise named Pax Records, folded after its owner fled with all its assets.

The concert album Live at the Whitehouse was recorded in Washington, D.C., in 1985 at the 9:30 Club and was released the following year in 1986. They also released the studio EP Jesus Is Dead in 1986, followed by Live and Loud, a videography of the Exploited performing across Europe and the United States. During the US tour, Wattie and Karl Morris had an altercation on stage, and Karl left shortly afterwards. He was briefly replaced by Mad Mick, who then disappeared without trace. Nigel Swanson was then appointed as the new guitarist.

=== Death Before Dishonour, The Massacre and Beat the Bastards (1987–2002) ===
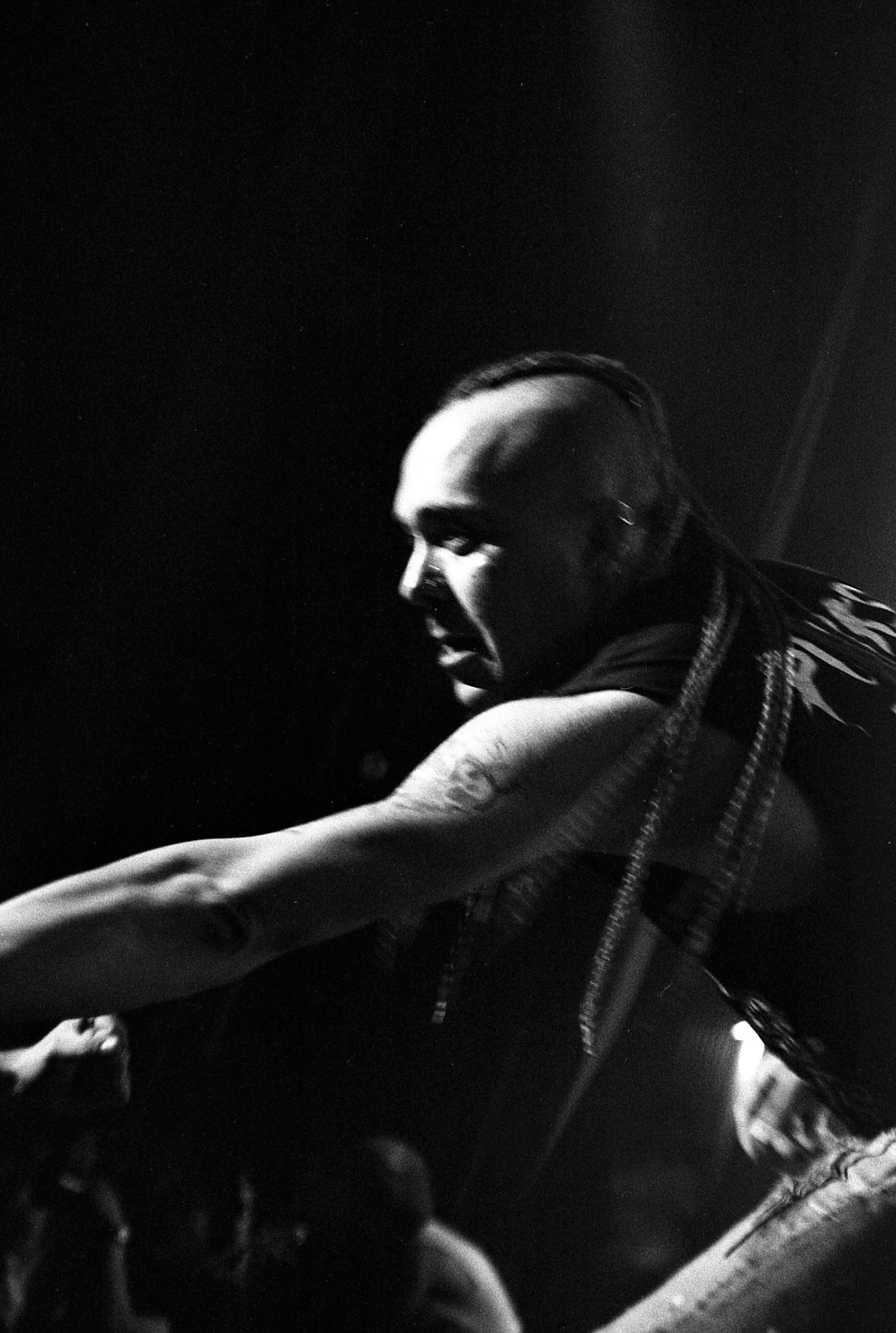
Wattie Buchan performing with the Exploited in Japan, 1991

"Sexual Favours", a single from the album Death Before Dishonour, was released in 1987. The album only ranked in the top 200 of the British Alternative Music chart. However, the album sold out quickly. The album's cover featured artwork from the American punk artist Pushead, who complained that he was neither paid nor credited for the work.

In 1990, the Exploited released their album The Massacre. The album is a crossover thrash album. The band went on to release a Singles Collection album in 1993. The Exploited also released the videography Live in Japan in 1993. Their album Beat the Bastards was released in April 1996.

=== Fuck the System and next album (2003–present) ===
In early 2003, the band released the album Fuck the System on Dream Catcher Records, and in the following year, they toured the UK and the US. On 14 October 2003, around 500 fans sparked a riot in Montreal, Canada after an Exploited concert was cancelled due to the band being denied entry into the country. Rioters overturned and set fire to eight cars, broke eleven shop windows, and caused other damage. The band was banned from performing in Mexico City as a result of the riot.

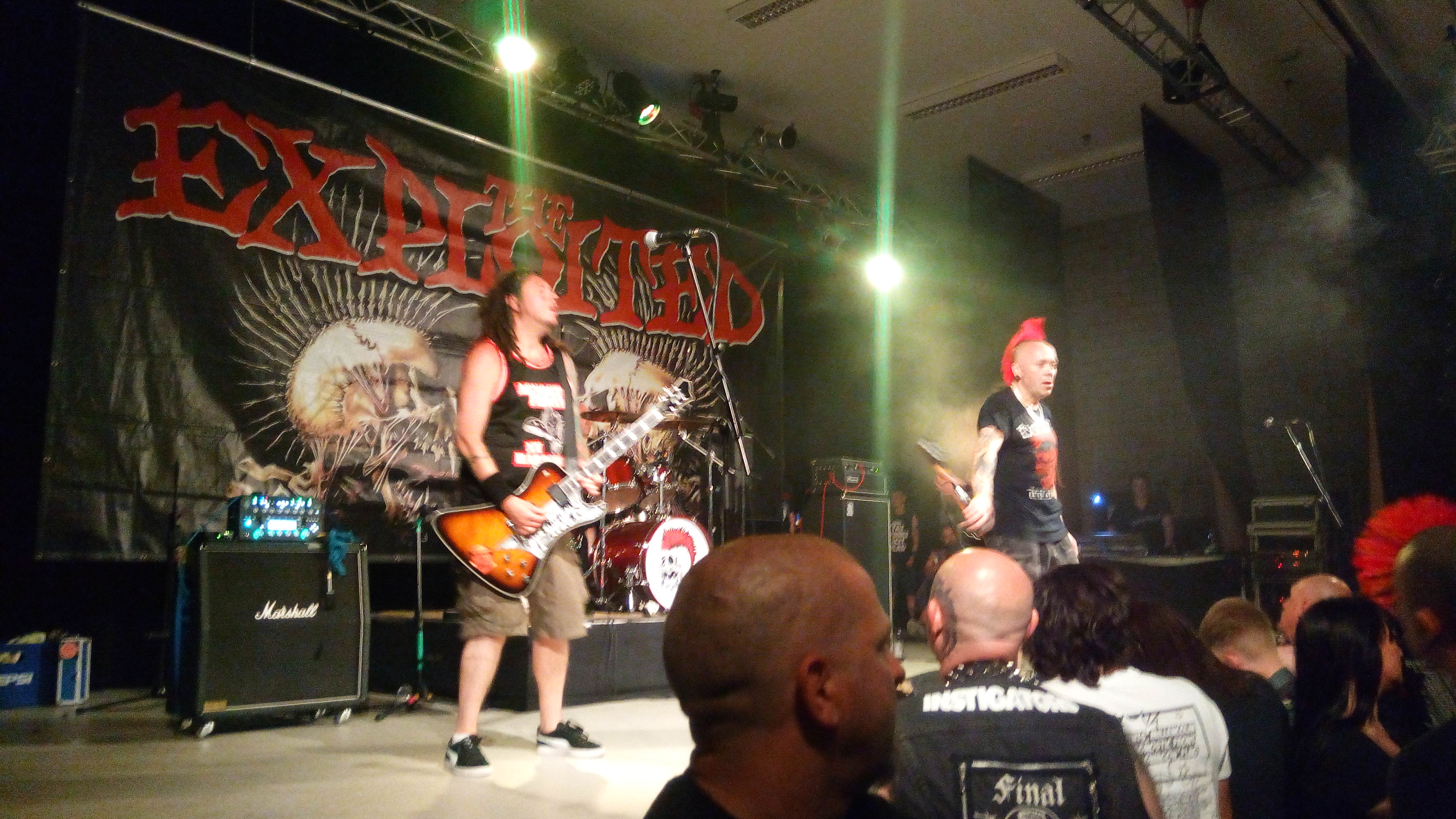
The Exploited performing in 2018

In a 2012 interview, Wattie Buchan stated that a new album was nearing completion. In February 2014, Wattie Buchan suffered a heart attack on stage during a performance in Lisbon as part of the band's Taste of Chaos Tour with Hatebreed and Napalm Death. He was taken to hospital, where he was expected to remain for at least a week for treatment. The band signed a deal with Nuclear Blast Records, and it was planned that many of their albums would be reissued in March 2014. The band also confirmed that their first album in a decade would be released during the 2010s.

In March 2020, Wattie Buchan responded to the coronavirus outbreak that was forcing bands to cancel or postpone tours. He made a pointed remark about Green Day (a band he had frequently stated he disliked), saying, "Fuck coronavirus! I have had 5 heart attacks, a quadruple heart bypass and a heart pacemaker fitted. Cancel gigs for a virus? We ain't fucking Green Day piss – We are the real deal. No danger will we be cancelling our upcoming gigs. Punks Not Dead!" The Australian leg of the tour was cancelled four days later, although the band completed all the scheduled New Zealand gigs.

== Legacy ==
The Exploited are one of the iconic bands of the UK 82 punk movement, alongside Charged GBH and Discharge. The term "UK 82" was derived from the Exploited's song "UK 82". AllMusic described the Exploited as "one of the most riveting British punk rock units of the early 1980s".

The Exploited have influenced Metallica, Slayer, Anthrax, Nirvana, Queens of the Stone Age, Discharge, Stormtroopers of Death, Agnostic Front, Exodus, the Virus, Napalm Death, Terrorizer, NOFX, Rancid, Dropkick Murphys, the Casualties, Pennywise, 7 Seconds, Anti-Flag, Blanks 77, Atari Teenage Riot, Death Angel, and Total Chaos.

== Musical style and influences ==
The Exploited has been categorised as crossover thrash, punk rock, thrash metal, speed metal, punk metal, anarchist punk, hardcore punk, street punk and oi!. Originally playing street punk and oi!, The Exploited evolved into a crossover thrash band with their album Death Before Dishonour. The Exploited's influences include Sex Pistols, The Sensational Alex Harvey Band, the Vibrators, the Threats, Alternative, the Belsen Horrors, and Johnny Moped. Wattie Buchan has also mentioned being influenced by James Brown and has expressed his admiration for The Cure's first four albums.

== Lyrics ==
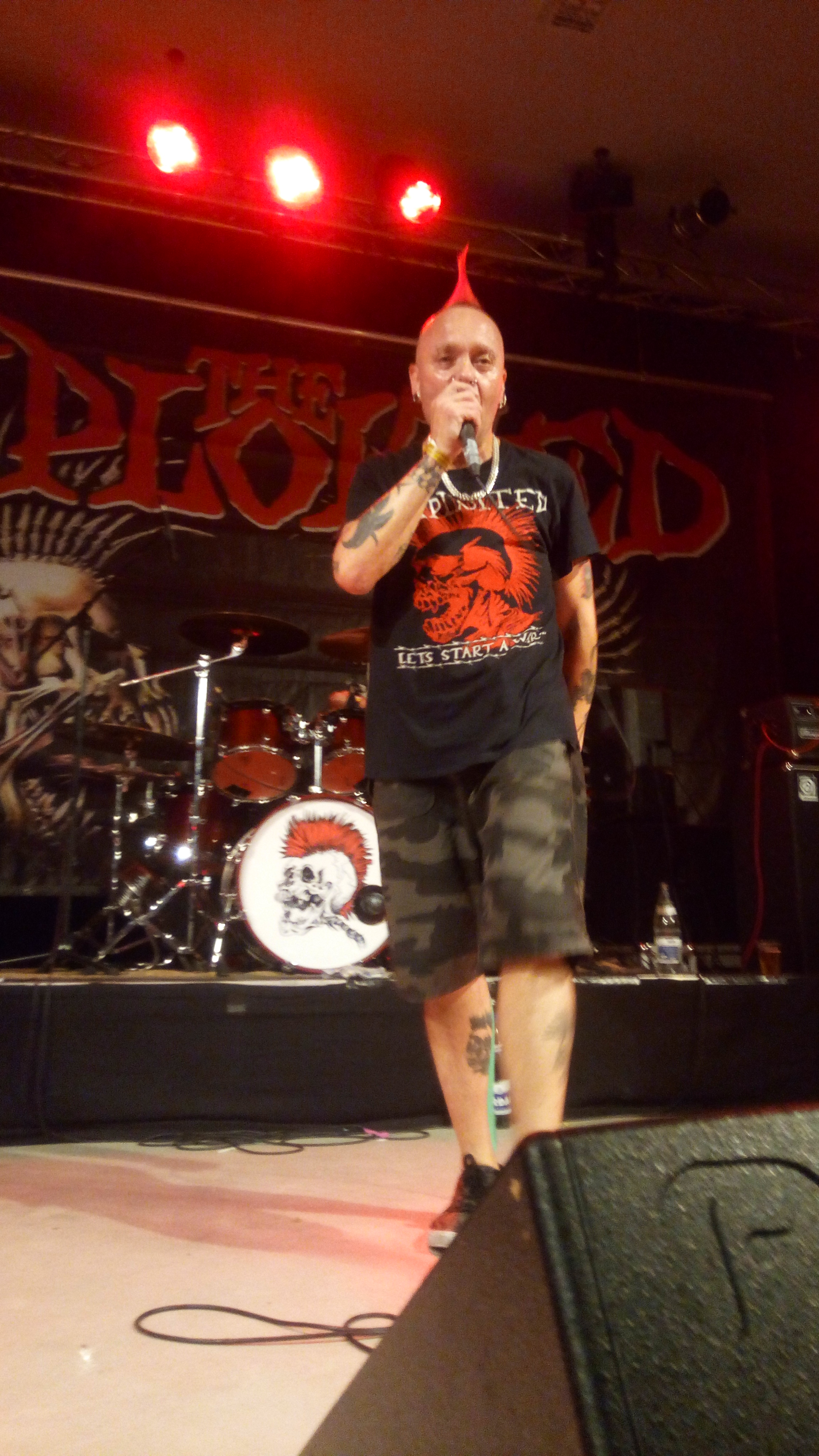
Wattie performing with the Exploited in 2018

The Exploited have been controversial for their aggressive lyrics and rowdy gigs. Ian Glasper described them as "cartoon punks." Glasper wrote: "For many, the Exploited were the quintessential second wave punk band with their senses-searing high-speed outbursts against the system, and wild-eyed frontman Walter 'Wattie' Buchan's archetypal orange mohican."

The Exploited are known for their lyrics addressing anarchy, politics and anti-authority themes. During a 1983 interview, the Exploited stated that they were not a political band, but their lyrics became increasingly political in the late 1980s. Wattie Buchan noted in the documentary Punk's Not Dead that punk is defined by its politics. As a band with anarchist-themed lyrics, the Exploited's vocalist Wattie Buchan identifies as an anarchist and has openly expressed disdain for politics. The Exploited have written songs about former British Prime Minister Margaret Thatcher and have conveyed a negative view towards her. The song "Maggie" from the band's album Horror Epics is specifically about Thatcher. The Exploited's third studio album, "Let's Start a War... (Said Maggie One Day)," centres on Margaret Thatcher and the Falklands War. Other themes explored in the album include police-led riots, war, unemployment, and a sense of hopelessness. Many songs from the mid-1980s focus on the threat of nuclear war.

The fans of the Exploited were nicknamed the Barmy Army. During the rivalry between the Exploited and Conflict, there were occasional clashes with fans of Conflict, known as "the Conflict Crew". In addition to the anti-social behaviour of the band and some of their fans, the Exploited would often cancel gigs at short notice in the 1980s, which led many venues to refuse to work with them.

After the 1981 Southall riot, Oi! bands, in general, became associated with racism, and the Exploited were sometimes believed to be a racist band due to Wattie's swastika tattoo, an incident in the early 1980s where Wattie fought with a group of Asians in a café, and in 1985 when "Deptford John" joined from the skinhead band Combat 84. The band has denied all accusations of racism.

As of August 2017, the band's website includes a history that mentions some of the issues surrounding their gigs, such as a riot after a show at the Rainbow in Finsbury Park, London, when the Jam were playing nearby and Wattie incited fans to attack the Mods, and a statement made onstage in Argentina that the Falkland Islands are British forever. George Same has written about the fighting after the Finsbury Park gig in his book on modern music, Backward Moddy Boy. In a documentary about the band, former manager Gem Howard stated that he would often sneak the band out of hotels late at night, as they would frequently vandalise the hotel and steal items from the rooms.

== Current members ==
- Wattie Buchan – vocals 1979–present
- Irish Rob – bass 2004–present
- Steve Campbell – guitars 2020–present
- Gary "G-Man" Sullivan – drums 2024–present

== Discography ==
- Punks Not Dead (1981)
- Troops of Tomorrow (1982)
- Let's Start a War... (Said Maggie One Day) (1983)
- Horror Epics (1985)
- Death Before Dishonour (1987)
- The Massacre (1990)
- Beat the Bastards (1996)
- Fuck the System (2003)
