= Thatcher's Techbase =

- Developer: 3D: Doom Daddy Digital
- Director: Jim Purvis
- Artist: Rafael Batista de Lima
- Composer: Barry Topping
- Engine: Doom engine
- Platforms: Windows, macOS, Linux, Android, Nintendo 3DS, Nintendo Wii
- Release: 24 September 2021
- Genre: First-person shooter
- Modes: Single-player, multiplayer

Thatcher's Techbase (Note: In the Doom community, techbase is jargon for a map or mapset that is characterized by a technologically advanced and militaristic sci-fi aesthetic.) is a mod for the video game Doom II, released by Scottish Doom developer 3D: Doom Daddy Digital on 24 September 2021. The game is set in the United Kingdom, and the player is tasked with killing former prime minister Margaret Thatcher, who has risen from the dead.

== Gameplay ==
Doomguy fighting a chaingunner with the new Winchester shotgun. Pro-Thatcher propaganda is visible in the background.

Thatcher's Techbase is a WAD for Doom 2, and largely retains the same first-person shooter gameplay, but features new weapons, levels, and enemies. The WAD supports co-op and deathmatch, and it offers five difficulty levels.

== Plot ==
In Thatcher's Techbase, Margaret Thatcher, "one of humanity's greatest threats", rises from the dead, leading the player to descend into the tenth circle of Hell, the United Kingdom, in order to kill her and send her back to Hell.

== Development ==
Development of Thatcher's Techbase began in winter 2020 as a joke, after director Jim Purvis saw Twitter user @spewlieandrews claim that if he was sent to Hell, he would "spend eternity scouring the place for Thatcher". Purvis said that the game is dedicated to "everyone Margaret Thatcher hated and everyone who hated Margaret Thatcher".

On 15 September 2021, a trailer for Thatcher's Techbase was released, which announced the game's release date. Initial response to the announcement was described by Purvis "as shockingly huge", with the WAD receiving the attention of initial Doom developer John Romero.

The game's soundtrack is composed by Barry "Epoch" Topping, who also wrote the music for Paradise Killer.

== Controversy ==
In September 2022, Thatcher's Techbase featured in a number of British newspapers when former Labour leader and independent MP Jeremy Corbyn was pictured playing an arcade version of the game at The World Transformed in Liverpool. Later, in 2024, Bethesda removed Thatcher's Techbase mod from Doom II's official mod browsers due to concerns over "real-world politics".
