= Punks Not Dead =

Studio album by The Exploited
- Released: 1981
- Genre: Oi!; street punk
- Length: 37:33
- Label: Secret, Chappel Music Limited, Captain Oi! (reissue)
- Producer: Dave Leaper, The Exploited

The Exploited chronology
Punks Not Dead (1981)	Troops of Tomorrow (1982)

Singles from Punks Not Dead
- 1. "Army Life" Released: 1980; 2. "Exploited Barmy Army" Released: 1980; 3. "Dogs of War" Released: May 1981

Professional ratings
Review scores
Source	Rating
AllMusic	3/5 stars
Sounds	5/5 stars

Punks Not Dead is the first studio album by the Scottish punk rock band The Exploited, released in April 1981 on Secret Records. Working class and loyal to the first impulses of the 1970s punk movement, the album was a reaction to critics who believed the punk rock genre was dead, and went against popular trends such as new wave and post-punk. It contains the double A side singles "Army Life/Fuck the Mods" and the later follow up "I Believe in Anarchy". "Army Life" details the experiences of Wattie Buchan when he was a 17-year-old squaddie on a tour of duty in Belfast in the 1970s.

Punks Not Dead peaked at no 20 on the UK charts in May of that year, gave the band a national following in the United Kingdom and it was the top selling 1981 independent UK release.

== Legacy ==
Supported by a tour with the Anti-Nowhere League, the album had underground success and is regarded as one of the definitive Oi! albums, and its popularity gave rise to a variety of punk rock bands including The Business. The Exploited's song "Punks Not Dead" has symbolic significance for the punk movement.

== Track listing ==
Side one

1. "Punks Not Dead" – 1:51
2. "Mucky Pup" (Puncture cover) – 1:42
3. "Cop Cars" – 1:52
4. "Free Flight" – 3:35
5. "Army Life" – 2:37
6. "Blown to Bits" – 2:40
7. "Sex & Violence" – 5:11

Side two

1. "S.P.G." – 2:07
2. "Royalty" – 2:07
3. "Dole Q" – 1:51
4. "Exploited Barmy Army" – 2:28
5. "Ripper" – 2:03
6. "Out of Control" – 2:52
7. "Son of a Copper" – 2:39
8. "I Believe in Anarchy" – 2:03

=== Captain Oi! re-release ===
The Captain Oi! re-release (2001) includes The Exploited's contribution to Oi! The Album compilation and the first four singles (minus "I Believe in Anarchy" from the "Exploited Barmy Army" single) and was mastered by Tim Turan.

1. "Daily News" (Oi! The Album version)
2. "I Still Believe in Anarchy" (Oi! The Album version)
3. "Army Life" (single version)
4. "Fuck the Mods" ("Army Life" single)
5. "Crashed Out" ("Army Life" single)
6. "Exploited Barmy Army" (single version)
7. "What You Gonna Do" ("Exploited Barmy Army" single)
8. "Dogs of War" ("Dogs of War" single)
9. "Blown to Bits (Live)" ("Dogs of War" single)
10. "Dead Cities" ("Dead Cities" single)
11. "Hitler's in the Charts Again" ("Dead Cities" single)
12. "Class War" ("Dead Cities" single)

All songs written by The Exploited except "Mucky Pup" (by Puncture).

== Personnel ==
The Exploited

- Wattie Buchan - vocals
- Big John Duncan - guitar, backing vocals
- Gary McCormack - bass guitar, backing vocals
- Glen "Dru Stix" Campbell - drums

with:

- Carole & Navi - backing vocals
- Produced by Dave Leaper and The Exploited
- Mark Brennan and Karyn Dunning - liner notes
- Brian Burrow - sleeve remix
- Neil Ross - engineer
- Mastered by Porky
- Scott Billett - photography

== Sources ==
- Cogan, Brian, Encyclopedia of Punk Music and Culture, Westport, CN: Greenwood Press, 2006. pg 170–171. ISBN 0-31333-340-8.
- Credits
- Tracks, Info and Credits
- Reissue
