= Let's Start a War =

Studio album by The Exploited
- Released: 1983; 2001 (reissue)
- Studio: Revolution Studios, Cheadle Hulme, Cheshire
- Genre: Street punk, hardcore punk
- Length: 34:36
- Label: Pax; Captain Oi! (reissue)
- Producer: Wattie Buchan, Marcus Featherby

The Exploited chronology
Troops of Tomorrow (1982)	Let's Start a War (1983)	Horror Epics (1985)

Professional ratings
Review scores
Source	Rating
AllMusic	3.5/5 stars

Let's Start a War, or Let's Start a War... (Said Maggie One Day), is the third album by Scottish punk band The Exploited, released in 1983 through Pax Records. The title refers to Margaret Thatcher's decision to go to war over the Falkland Islands in 1982, suggesting that she did so almost on a whim. The controversial war was fodder for many protest songs in the punk movement. It was reissued on Captain Oi! Records in 2001, which featured three tracks from their Rival Leaders EP.

== Lyrical themes ==
Being The Exploited's most politically-charged album, the lyrics on the album talk about subjects such as Margaret Thatcher's decision to go to war over the Falkland Islands, anti-war, police-driven riots, war, unemployment and hopelessness.

Despite the album's lyrics questioning the Falklands War, The Exploited later announced on stage at a gig in Argentina that the Falklands were British forever.

== Track listing ==
- All tracks written by Wattie Buchan and Big John Duncan, unless otherwise stated.

Side one

1. "Let's Start a War (Said Maggie One Day)" – 3:13
2. "Insanity" – 4:19
3. "Safe Below" – 2:17
4. "Eyes of the Vulture" – 4:01
5. "Should We, Can't We" – 1:41
6. "Rival Leaders" – 2:43

Side two

1. "God Saved the Queen" (Buchan) – 5:43
2. "Psycho" – 2:01
3. "Kidology" – 2:09
4. "False Hopes" (Buchan) – 1:39
5. "Another Day to Go Nowhere" (Buchan) – 2:31
6. "Wankers" (Buchan) – 2:37

== Personnel ==
The Exploited

- Wattie Buchan – vocals
- John Duncan – guitar
- Wayne Tyas – bass
- Willie Buchan – drums

Production

- Barry Sage and Stewart Picking – engineering, mixing
- Marcus Featherby – producer
- Brian Burrows – sleeve remix
- Mark Brennan – liner notes
- Mixed at Southern Studios
- Recorded at Revolution Studios
- Distributed by Red Rhino and The Cartel
