= Poznań City Council =

Local government body in Poznań, Poland

Poznań City Council Rada Miasta Poznania

Type
- Type: Unicameral

Leadership
- Chairman: Grzegorz Ganowicz, KO
- Vice-Chairmen: Łukasz Kapustka, PL2050; Andrzej Rataj, KO; Mateusz Rozmiarek, PiS

Structure
- Seats: 34
- Political groups: Mayoral coalition (28): Civic Coalition (22); The Left Poland 2050 (6); The Left (3); Poland 2050 (3); Opposition (6): Law and Justice (6)

Elections
- Voting system: Multi-member electoral districts with five-year terms
- Last election: 7 April 2024
- Next election: 2029

Website
- bip.poznan.pl/rada-miasta/

The Poznań City Council is the governing body of the city of Poznań in Poland. The council has 34 elected members elected every five years in an election by city voters through a secret ballot. The election of City Council and the local head of government, which takes place at the same time, is based on legislation introduced on 20 June 2002.

== Election results ==
=== 2024 ===
All 34 seats on the city council were being contested in the 2024 election.

Party	Votes	%	Seats
Civic Coalition	91,702	49.09	22
United Right – Poznań	33,688	18.04	6
The Left	22,487	12.04	3
Third Way	21,634	11.58	3
Social Poznań	11,252	6.02	0
Pro-Polish Confederation	6,026	3.23	0
Total	186,789	100.00	34

=== 2018 ===
All 34 seats on the city council were being contested in the 2018 election.

Party	Votes	%	Seats
Platform.Modern Civic Coalition	104,427	46.83	21
Law and Justice	49,165	22.05	9
The Left (Note: Coalition of Democratic Left Alliance, Together and Polish Initiative.)	22,411	10.05	2
Social Coalition "Right to the City"	19,755	8.86	2
Committee of Jarosław Pucek Good of the City (Note: Includes Democratic Left Alliance dissidents.)	14,579	6.54	0
Kukiz'15	7,733	3.47	0
Poznań Anew Civic Initiative	4,912	2.20	0
Total	222,982	100.00	34
