= Beat the Bastards =

Studio album by The Exploited
- Released: 23 April 1996
- Genre: Crossover thrash
- Length: 51:34
- Label: Rough Justice
- Producer: Colin Richardson, ZM, Wattie Buchan

The Exploited chronology
The Massacre (1990)	Beat the Bastards (1996)	Fuck the System (2003)

Professional ratings
Review scores
Source	Rating
AllMusic	3/5 stars

Beat the Bastards is the seventh album by Scottish punk rock band The Exploited, released in 1996 through Rough Justice Records. The song "They Lie" was covered on End of Disclosure by Hypocrisy.

== Track listing ==
No.	Title	Length
1.	"Beat the Bastards"	4:21
2.	"Affected by Them"	3:04
3.	"Don't Blame Me"	5:00
4.	"Law for the Rich"	3:20
5.	"System F****d Up"	2:48
6.	"They Lie"	2:45
7.	"If You're Sad"	5:20
8.	"Fight Back"	3:25
9.	"Massacre of Innocents"	4:00
10.	"Police TV"	3:44
11.	"Sea of Blood"	3:57
12.	"Fifteen Years"	3:05
13.	"Serial Killer"	6:45
Total length:		51:34

== Personnel ==
=== The Exploited ===
- Wattie Buchan – vocals
- Fraser Rosetti – guitar
- Jim Gray – bass
- Willie Buchan – drums

=== Additional personnel ===
- Jim Spencer and ZM – engineering
- Colin Richardson – mixing
- Frank Arkwright – digital editing
