= Foursight Theatre =

Devising Company

Foursight Theatre is a female-led devising theatre company, established in 1987 and based in the West Midlands town of Wolverhampton. They are known for their tongue-in-cheek satire Thatcher The Musical! (produced in 2006 with the Warwick Arts Centre). They have also produced The Corner Shop, about shopkeepers, customers and families, set in an abandoned shop in Sandwell, West Bromwich.

The company produces shows for national touring and site-specific work rooted in their home region.
