= Secret Records =

British independent record label

- Founded: 1980
- Founder: Martin Hooker
- Genre: Punk, Rock, blues, soul, reggae, psychedelic, folk
- Country of origin: England
- Location: London
- Official website: secretrecordslimited.com

Secret Records is a British independent record label founded in 1980 and based in London. The label specializes in a number of genres including blues, reggae, rock 'n' roll, psychedelic, soul and punk. The label's roster includes releases by John Mayall, Bert Jansch, Happy Mondays, Geno Washington, Toy Dolls, Ned's Atomic Dustbin, Fastway, the Exploited, Hawkwind, Ike Turner, InMe, Lee Perry, LA Guns, Alicia Previn, and many more.

Originally starting as a punk label, Secret Records was created in 1980 with the first release being the Exploited's Punks Not Dead which reached number 20 on the UK Albums Chart. As the 1990s came around, the catalogue of Secret Records became less rooted in punk and became broader in genre choice including pop/rock. After 2000, the label began concentrating more on music DVD releases as well as live CD releases. Secret Records have a number of sublabels and have their entire catalogue on a number of streaming websites as well as releasing limited edition vinyl.

== See also ==
- List of record labels
