= Maggie's Club =

Nightclub in London, England

Coordinates: 51.4863°N 0.1801°W

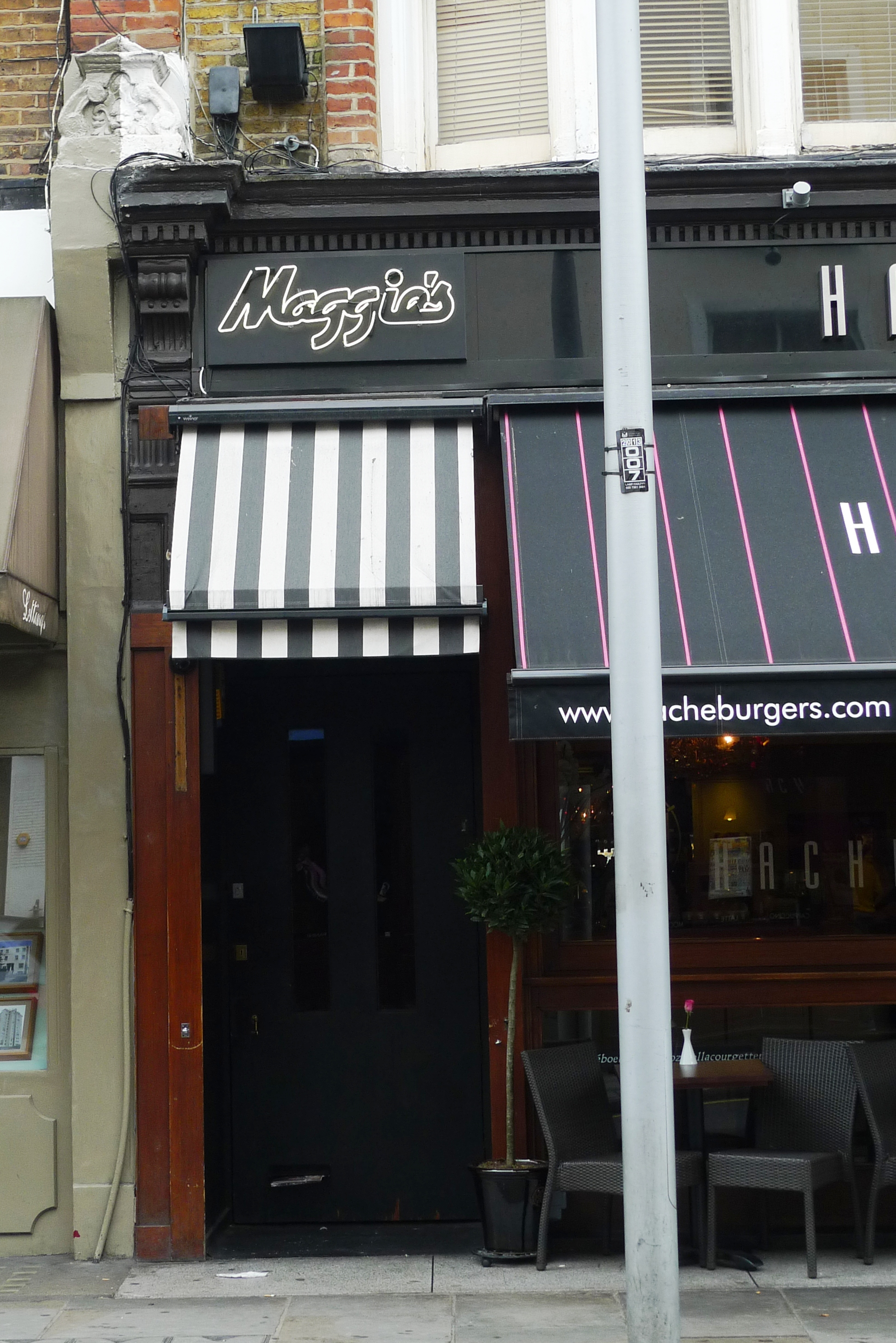
Entrance to Maggie's Club

Maggie's Club is a Margaret Thatcher themed nightclub in Chelsea, London. The venue has overt references to the former Prime Minister, such as black-and-white photos on the stairs, a mural of Thatcher on the wall, and the former Conservative leader's speeches playing in the lavatories.
