= Death Before Dishonour =

Studio album by The Exploited
- Released: 15 April 1987
- Recorded: 1986–1987
- Genre: Crossover thrash
- Length: 39:21; 68:15 (reissue)
- Label: Rough Justice, Spitfire
- Producer: Wattie Buchan, Dave Pine

The Exploited chronology
| Horror Epics (1985) | Death Before Dishonour (1987) | The Massacre (1990) |

Singles from Death Before Dishonour
- 1. "Sexual Favours" Released: 1987

Professional ratings
Review scores
| Source | Rating |
|---|---|
| AllMusic | 3/5 stars |

Death Before Dishonour is the fifth studio album by the Scottish punk rock band The Exploited. It was released on 15 April 1987 through Rough Justice Records. With this release, The Exploited moved to a more crossover thrash direction. This album was re-released on 19 June 2001 on Spitfire Records and contained an additional seven tracks. A music video of the band playing live with a woman was released for the 1987 single "Sexual Favours". The album cover features the Grim Reaper and former Prime Minister Margaret Thatcher. The album ranked in the top 200 of the Britain Alternative Music list.

== Style ==
This album moves away from The Exploited's street punk/Oi! style and moves to a heavier style that has elements of speed metal, crossover thrash and hardcore punk. Featuring strong elements of metal, punk rock elements are present on the album. The song "Sexual Favours" isn't a metal song and is different from the other songs on the album. The song is notable for its use of female vocals. "Sexual Favours" has a bass line that is similar to the bass line in the Pink Floyd song "Let There Be More Light".

== Track listing ==
All songs written by Wattie Buchan, except for where noted.

1. "Anti-UK" – 3:03
2. "Power Struggle" – 3:34
3. "Scaling the Derry Wall" – 3:59
4. "Barry Prossitt" – 3:50
5. "Don't Really Care" – 3:12
6. "No Forgiveness" – 3:36
7. "Death Before Dishonour" – 3:05
8. "Adding to Their Fears" (Buchan, Nig Swanson) – 2:40
9. "Police Informer" – 2:42
10. "Drive Me Insane" (Buchan, Swanson) – 3:44
11. "Pulling Us Down" – 4:16
12. "Sexual Favours" – 3:40

=== CD reissue bonus tracks ===
13. "Drug Squad Man" (Buchan, Swanson) – 3:17
14. "Privacy Invasion" – 3:50
15. "Jesus Is Dead" (Buchan, John Duncan) – 3:20
16. "Politicians" (Buchan, John Duncan) – 2:31
17. "War Now" – 3:56
18. "United Chaos and Anarchy" – 4:14
19. "Sexual Favours" (Dub version) – 3:47

== Personnel ==
The Exploited

- Wattie Buchan – vocals
- Nig – guitar
- Tony Lochiel – bass
- Wullie Buchan – drums, guitar

with:

- The Pimmels (Kev the Hammer, Capt. Scarlet, Jim Pimmel) – additional vocals
- Rasta Deb, Tracy, Kathie – backing vocals on track 12
- Morten Lund – mastering
