= Arms-to-Iraq affair =

UK export of weapons to Iraq (1989–1992)

The Arms-to-Iraq affair concerned the uncovering of the government-endorsed sale of arms by British companies to Iraq, then under the rule of Saddam Hussein, during the Iran–Iraq War (1980–1988). The scandal contributed to the growing dissatisfaction with the Conservative government of John Major and the atmosphere of sleaze that contributed to the electoral landslide for Tony Blair's Labour Party at the 1997 general election. The whole affair also highlighted the weakness of the constitutional convention of individual ministerial accountability, leading to its codification as the Ministerial Code by the Blair Government.

Following the first Gulf War of 1991 there was interest in the extent to which British companies had been supplying Saddam Hussein's administration with the materials to prosecute the war. Four directors of the British machine tools manufacturer Matrix Churchill were put on trial for supplying equipment and knowledge to Iraq, but in 1992 the trial collapsed, when it was revealed that the company had been advised by the government on how to sell arms to Iraq. Several of the directors were eventually paid compensation.

== Matrix Churchill ==
Classified documents released at the trial indicate that Britain violated the embargo in an effort to keep the country's machine-tool industry, including Matrix Churchill, whose managing director Paul Henderson had been working unpaid for British intelligence for 15 years, in business.
—The Economist (1992)

Matrix Churchill was an engineering company based in Coventry, with expertise in both the design and manufacture of precision machine tools. Established in 1913 by Walter Tattler and his brother-in-law Sir Harry Harley, the company had its origins in gauge and tool manufacture, the original company being known as Walter Tattler Ltd.

In 1989, as a result of a debt settlement, it was acquired by "Iraqi interests" for nothing. New directors were appointed, including two who worked for the Iraqi security services and the company began shipping components for Saddam Hussein's secret weapons programme. According to the International Atomic Energy Authority, its products found in Iraq were among the highest quality of their kind in the world. They were "dual use" machines that could be used to manufacture weapons including artillery shells and parts for medium-range missiles.

As one of the other directors claimed to have been working for the British intelligence services, the Ministry of Defence advised Matrix Churchill on how to apply for export licences of materials that could be used to make munitions in such a way that would not attract attention. When Alan Clark admitted under oath that he had been "economical with the actualité" in answering questions regarding what he knew about the policy on arms exports to Iraq, the trial collapsed and triggered the Scott Inquiry, which reported in 1996.

This case also raised the issue of public interest immunity, the process by which information believed to be highly sensitive is kept outside the public domain. In order to prevent information being public, the relevant government minister must issue a public interest immunity certificate.

== See also ==
- British support for Iraq during the Iran–Iraq war
- Campaign Against Arms Trade
- International aid to combatants in the Iran–Iraq War
- Foreign involvement in the Yemeni Civil War
- Project Babylon, a project with unknown objectives commissioned by Iraqi president Saddam Hussein to build a series of "superguns"

== Bibliography ==
- Cowley, Chris; Blake, Robin. Supergun: A Political Scandal. Arrow. ISBN 0-09-918781-7.
- James, Gerald (1995). In the Public Interest: A Devastating Account of the Thatcher Government's Involvement in the Covert Arms Trade, by the Man Who Turned Astra Fireworks into a £100m Arms Manufacturer. Little, Brown & Company. ISBN 978-0316877190.
- Paul Henderson (1993). The Unlikely Spy: An Autobiography. Bloomsbury. ISBN 0747515972.
- Leigh, David (1993). Betrayed: Trial of Matrix Churchill. Bloomsbury. ISBN 0-7475-1552-2.
- Miller, Davina (1997). Export or Die: Britain's Defence Trade with Iran and Iraq (Global Issues). Northeastern University Press. ISBN 1-55553-285-3.
- Norton-Taylor; Richard Lloyd; Mark Cook, Stephen (1996). Knee Deep in Dishonour: Scott Report and Its Aftermath. Weidenfeld & Nicolson. ISBN 0-575-06385-8.
- Phythian, Mark (1996). Arming Iraq (Northeastern Series in Transnational Crime). Continuum International Publishing Group Ltd. ISBN 0-304-33852-4.
