= British support for Iraq during the Iran–Iraq War =

- United Kingdom: Iraq

The United Kingdom supported Ba'athist Iraq as early as 1981 during the Iran–Iraq War by covertly providing military equipment and arms. Although officially neutral in the conflict, the United Kingdom made direct sales to both Iraq and Iran. With an embargo in effect various companies also supplied Iraq and Iran by shipping materials through third-party countries and from those countries to the belligerents. While some of this exporting was legal, permitted or tolerated by parliament, Iraqi clandestine procurement operations were especially active in Britain.

== Motives for policy towards Iraq ==
In spite of the British embargo, both the Iraqis and Iranians purchased British goods, from BMARC and other countries, using false end user certificates citing the destination as Singapore, Jordan or South Africa.

Economically, Britain wanted to continue an export trade with Iran and Iraq, which accounted for a total of 1 billion pounds per year. These guidelines, according to evidence to the Scott arms-to-Iraq inquiry, were subsequently secretly relaxed. After "The United Nations imposed an embargo, to try to restore stability to the region. Britain imposed its own rules—known as the "Howe guidelines" after the then Foreign Secretary, Sir Geoffrey Howe—restricting exports. While there was a strict ban on "lethal" exports, there was more flexibility if the proposed export, in the Government's view, would not prolong or exacerbate the conflict.

=== Export guidelines ===
It was later established that guidelines had been established but not followed. The Scott report showed that the "Howe Principles", or the "Government's stated policy on arms sales to Iran and Iraq was set out by Lord Howe in October 1985 when he was Foreign Secretary. He informed the House of the following set of guidelines to all deliveries of defence equipment to Iran and Iraq, implemented in December 1984 ..." had not been followed. The Guidelines were:

1. We should maintain our consistent refusal to supply any lethal equipment to either side;
2. Subject to that overriding consideration, we should attempt to fulfil existing contracts and obligations;
3. We should not, in future, approve orders for any defence equipment which, in our view, would significantly enhance the capability of either side to prolong or exacerbate the conflict;
4. In the line with this policy, we should continue to scrutinise rigorously all applications for export licences for the supply of defence equipment to Iran and Iraq.

=== Scott report ===
The "Scott report" on British sales to Iraq, of "non-lethal" military-related goods, as distinct from actual weapons, which took three years to prepare under the direction of senior high court judge Sir Richard Scott, criticized government handling, but also rejected that Members of Parliament tried to bias the court trying the Matrix Churchill defendants. In particular, it singled out Attorney General Sir Nicholas Lyell and Treasury Chief Secretary William Waldegrave, Baron Waldegrave of North Hill for their errors.

One of the main problems highlighted in the report was the decision of the government not to inform Parliament of reforms to arms export laws for fear of public outcry. The report concluded government policy towards the export of non-lethal military goods was changed following the Iran–Iraq ceasefire in 1988, in a way that should have been reported to the Commons.

Scott's report explained the British government's secret decision to supply Saddam with even more weapons-related equipment after the Halabja chemical weapon on Iraqi Kurds by their own government. Former Foreign Secretary Howe had written that the ceasefire ending the Iran–Iraq War could mean "major opportunities for British industry" An official working for Howe, and quoted in the Scott Report, indicated Howe such an initiative kept quiet: "It could look very cynical if so soon after expressing outrage about the treatment of the Kurds, we adopt a more flexible approach to arms sales."

== Export controls ==
Member of Parliament Roger Berry, speaking in the House of Commons, said that the only truly important thing about export control is the identity of the true end user, who may not be the country on the end user certificate. "As the arms to Iraq scandal taught us, what matters is who gets the arms and what they do with them. The licence application might have said that the weapons were going to Jordan, but they ended up in Iraq.? He said the end-use information on the export license needs to be verified.

According to Berry, there "is no point [to] the Department of Trade and Industry (DTI) ticking the box and saying, "They say this is going to our friendly neighbour Austria," or, "This is going to our dear old friend Singapore." From some statistics, it seems that Singapore has the largest navy, air force and army in the world.... I simply urge the Minister to give us some information on how the Government go about end-use monitoring.

Especially on the financial side, there was a complex interaction between Iraqi-controlled organizations in the U.K. and U.S. One established British company, Matrix Churchill was bought by Iraq, its British branch an important manufacturer of advanced machine tools, and its American subsidiary used as a conduit for procurement in the U.S. Originally a well-established U.K. manufacturer of machine tools with a U.S. subsidiary, the firm had the U.S. operation greatly enlarged by Iraqis, using U.S. financing for Iraqi purchases that did not necessarily involve the U.K.

According to the Scott report, executives of Matrix-Churchill were charged for attempting to export arms without the required permission of Parliament. Under the changed rules, which had not been disclosed to Parliament, it was determined they had acted legally, and the Government was aware of the planned exports.

One of the criticisms in the Scott report was the government's attempt to obtain Public Interest Immunity (PII) certificate during the trial. Such certificates prevent the disclosure of documents showing a relationship between the defendants and British intelligence services. While the report did not suggest there was any attempt to punish innocent men, Scott's report said that the Crown prosecutors should have been told that Deputy Prime Minister Michael Heseltine was reluctant to use such a certificate.

=== Iraqi clandestine procurement techniques ===
There are several ways to use front companies. A company can be created for the purpose, or the nation interested in the products may take over an existing company. On occasion, an expert can be hired to give an existing company a new capability, or a new company can be built around an established expert, such as Gerald Bull.

Iraq's Nasr State Enterprise for Mechanical Industries was the main producer of Iraqi missiles and was heavily involved in clandestine nuclear and chemical weapons technology acquisition. It probably controlled the al-Arabi Trading Company.

=== Creating companies ===
Anees Mansour Wadi, an Iraqi expatriate, set up front companies all over Europe, which could be listed as end-users for a broad range of technology and items. In Britain, he teamed with the British businessman Roy Ricks, to form Meed International, Ltd, which was renamed to Technology Engineering Group (TEG).

According to Iraq's declaration to the IAEA Action Team, Iraqis went to the United Kingdom and worked with Wadi to procure items for the gaseous diffusion and the Beams-type centrifuge uranium enrichment programs. TEG bought a total of 75 items for these programs at a cost of about 1.25 million British pounds, and shipped the items to the Nassr.

=== Buying partial or complete control of established companies ===
The Al-Arabi Trading Co. was headquartered in Baghdad, and appears to have been under the control of Iraq's main weapons complex, the Nassr State Enterprise for Mechanical Industries. In 1987, Al-Arabi set up its main procurement front in London, a holding company called Technology Development Group or TDG. In 1987, TDG set up a firm called TMG Engineering [TMG] which was the vehicle used to purchase a well-established British machine tool maker Matrix-Churchill Ltd. and its Cleveland, OH, affiliate Matrix-Churchill Corp.

Al-Arabi has been banned from business with U.S. organizations at least since 1997.

==== Matrix Churchill ====
In 1987, the British Secret Intelligence Service (SIS or MI6) reported that British machine tool companies were selling equipment to Iraqi arms factories, including Matrix Churchill Ltd. [MCL], the United Kingdom's premier toolmaker and a major supplier of machine tools to arsenals around the world. It has been in existence since 1913 and its two plants in the United Kingdom employed over 700 people. Matrix-Churchill Corp. was the U.S. sales and service affiliate of MCL and it was established in Cleveland, OH, in 1967. The military uses of Matrix-Churchill machines are the prime reason Iraq was interested in purchasing the company.

Acquiring Matrix-Churchill gave Iraq access, not only to the machine tools, but also the computer programming, tooling, and other components needed to make a wide variety of munitions as well as other applications in aerospace and nuclear industries. The purchase could be construed as one big intelligence gathering operation for Iraq.

When Iraq gained control of MCC, it reoriented the firm such that the general market was no longer its priority, but to meet Iraq's needs. MCC's sales and service operations were dropped, but the Iraqis also set up a project management division within Matrix-Churchill in 1988.

That division obtained technology for Iraqi arms complexes like NASSR and Hutteen. The project management division was established to manage the activities of United States companies that won contracts to work in Iraq. The BNL-financed glass fiber factory at Nassr was the project management division's biggest project. Iraqi organizations that wanted products made in the US would send the request to Iraqi managers in Matrix-Churchill's procurement division, established in 1987, which would identify and evaluate sources in the United States, unless the UK division of Matrix-Churchill could make them. In some cases, the US side of Matrix-Churchill would buy the equipment in other cases. In other cases, Matrix-Churchill acted as a broker for the Iraqi end user, and Matrix-Churchill demanded and often received a kickback from the United States firm of between 5 and 10 percent of the total value of the contract. These kickbacks were intended to cover the cost of operating the procurement department.

The project management division, was under Sam Naman and Abdul Qaddum, who were believed to be an Iraqi intelligence operatives, having worked in the United Kingdom for the known Iraqi intelligence operative Safa Al Habobi, the front man who helped set up and operate the Al Arabi procurement network. Al Habobi was the owner of record of Matrix-Churchill Corp., and several other Iraqi front companies in the United States.

According to Gonzales, Qaddumi and Naman had previously worked together, "contrary to what they told the American employees working at Matrix-Churchill. The Iraqis working at Matrix-Churchill often talked about sensitive topics in Arabic rather than English. In addition, much of the correspondence related to sensitive matters such as discussions with Safa Al Habobi about money were written in Arabic to conceal the contents from the Americans working at MCC...In a July 10, 1989, memo, Al Habobi instructed employees of Matrix-Churchill to retain certain expense reports in Baghdad because they indicated that the Baghdad branch of Matrix-Churchill was paying various expenses of Iraqi military establishments. The memo stated:

There is some doubt here about the bills being presented in full (to Matrix-Churchill) as they are from Military companies that we feel, if they are translated by your accountants, cause you a few problems.

==== BMARC, Astra and Oerlikon ====
One of the arrangements came to light in 1995, regarding a company called BMARC. Previously owned by the Swiss arms manufacturer, Oerlikon, it was sold to the British Astra Holdings in May 1988. Apparently, Oerlikon continued as a partner in some transactions.

Astra executives and non-executive directors were well-connected to the British defense industry. It was not always clear, to the Government, if a project was being managed by BMARC, Astra, or, outside the UK, Oerlikon. "No one has yet mentioned that when the contract for that was signed the project was being handled by, and BMARC belonged to, Oerlikon, which is a Swiss company. It was not until nearly two years after that contract was entered into that the new management of Astra, headed by Mr. James, bought BMARC and continued with that contract. By 1988 the intelligence community realised that Oerlikon—not a British company—was exporting arms via Singapore to Iran but it did not specifically mention BMARC. His misfortune was that his very successful company, Astra, made two unfortunate purchases—BMARC and the other company that supplied the Iraqi gun, PRB.

Various Cabinet ministers said the guidelines were being followed, when current evidence shows they were not. In August 1991, the Government told the Select Committee on Trade and Industry: Our examination of the records shows that the policy announced in Parliament in 1985 was adhered to both in the spirit and in the letter".

==== Successful export control with Canira ====
While this took place slightly after the end of the Iran–Iraq War, another illustrative example was Iraq's interested in composite materials for its missile program. In the summer of 1989, TDG and Space Research Corporation (SRC), purchased the former Learfan factory in Northern Ireland under the name of Canira, Ltd. Learfan would fabricate carbon fiber composite materials Canira Ltd submitted an application to the Northern Ireland Industrial Development Board for financial assistance towards establishing a facility at the factory to produce components for the international aviation industry.

When the British government discovered TDC and SRC owned Canira, they stopped financial assistance, on the grounds "we have reason to believe that Canira's primary objective is to use the plant to gain experience in composite manufacture for the Iraqi missile program. Composites can also be used in the manufacture of ballistic missiles. In particular, they are a key component in the manufacture of heat shields for warhead reentry vehicles." There are other applications in advanced weapons. Frustrated in getting financial assistance, Iraqi officials decided to have TDG and SRC sell their interest, realizing a significant profit

=== Hiring experts ===
Technical experts can provide invaluable assistance to proliferant states, particularly those lacking specialized knowledge about nuclear areas. As a result, proliferant programs have invested considerable effort in recruiting experts.

Recruiting experts can be difficult and sometimes success depends on luck more than plans. In any case, knowledge of foreign industries and experts can be the starting point for a recruitment effort. In addition, trusted agents have been approached to find other experts.

Iraq was fortunate to have recruited three extraordinarily knowledgeable experts to help its gas centrifuge uranium enrichment program in the period 1988-1990. Walter Busse, Bruno Stemmler, and Karl Heinz Schaab had worked for years at MAN New Technology in Munich Germany, an important subcontractor to the German Urenco partner. Iraq recruited these experts through H&H Metalform.

==== Urenco ====
How much and exactly what type of assistance these three individuals provided Iraq has been intensively studied for over a decade. It will probably never be possible to develop an entirely consistent and complete picture of what they provided to Iraq. But it is clear that these experts provided a considerable amount of sensitive information about Urenco Group gas centrifuges. Urenco is owned by Ultra-Centrifuge Nederland (Dutch), Uranit GmbH (German) and British Nuclear Fuels plc (UK) in three equal shares. The assistance was broad in scope, occurred regularly in the period 1988–1990, and included many advanced Urenco technologies. The level of assistance provided by these three experts was key to progress in the Iraqi gas centrifuge program.

These three experts provided the Iraqi gas centrifuge program with classified design drawings of centrifuges developed in the late 1960s and early 1970s and a newer, advanced design from the mid-1980s.

=== Working with middlemen ===
Proliferant states often seek middlemen to facilitate the acquisition of sensitive items. In some cases, the middlemen obtain an item and transport it to the proliferant state. Other times, an agent merely puts the proliferant state in contact with a supplier who then provides the item. Although the item may be controlled, it is just as likely not to require an export license. The motivation for a middleman is usually money.

A country may use a middleman to disguise the true end-user of an item. A supplier may have previously dealt with a particular middleman and may accept the middleman's explanation of the end user. The following examples of Iraqi efforts serve to illustrate a range of activities of middlemen.

==== Buying maraging steel ====
Iraq used a complex set of intermediaries to buy maraging steel, a critical and export controlled materials. Maraging steel is extremely strong, and is used in applications as minor as high-quality golf clubs and vehicle transmissions, as well as militarily critical components for uranium enrichment centrifuges, cannon, missile casings. In 1989, through a complex set of companies, Iraq purchased 10 Aluminum tubes and carbon fiber composites (see Canira, a British company created by a British firm) are also used in gas centrifuges.

See the complex transactions in the article on French support to Iraq. The transactions eventually involved organizations in Iraq, France, West Germany, Great Britain, Saudi Arabia, Austria, Dubai, Jersey, and the United States.

== Land warfare ==
"In 1986, CAAT brought to public attention the attendance at the UK government's British Army Equipment Exhibition of an Iraqi delegation headed by the country's Director of Armaments and Supplies. After an outcry, the invitation to the equivalent naval event the next year was withdrawn."

=== Tank spares ===
In 1982 International Military Services (IMS), a company wholly owned by the Ministry of Defence (MoD), was given permission to repair British-made Chieftain tanks in Iraq's possession. The MoD said there had been no abandonment of neutrality, Britain would supply tank spares to both sides but no ammunition. According to a Parliamentary query, "International Military Services has signed only one export contract with Iraq since 1980. Details of this were given to the House on 2 July 1991."

=== Land Rovers and radar ===
Three hundred military Land Rovers, worth £3 million, and a large quantity of radar equipment said to be worth much more, were sold to Iraq in July 1985 to balance the export of the ships to Iran. (Sunday Telegraph, 28.7.85)

Since no details were given it is impossible to tell whether or not the radar mentioned above was the Thorn EMI Cymbeline (radar) battlefield system capable of locating enemy weapons, including artillery and helicopters, and directing the fire of mortars and guns. Iraq is the world's largest user of the Cymbeline system, with an estimated 1,500 systems deployed in Kuwait in early 1991 together with another 1,000 in southern Iraq. Cymbeline was supplied to Iraq during the 1980s and its operators trained in the UK in 1990. (Private Eye, 31.8.90; Thorn EMI Electronics entry, BAEE catalogue 1990; Sunday Times, 2.12.90; Jane's Defence Weekly, 2.2.91)

=== Marconi Systems artillery weather instruments ===
Iraq also has the Marconi Command and Control Systems' AMETS which "provides the solution for accurate and timely meteorological data needed to ensure accurate file." There is no indication when this might have been sold. (Jane's Defence Weekly, 2.2.91; Marconi catalogue)

== Air warfare ==
=== BAE Hawk ===
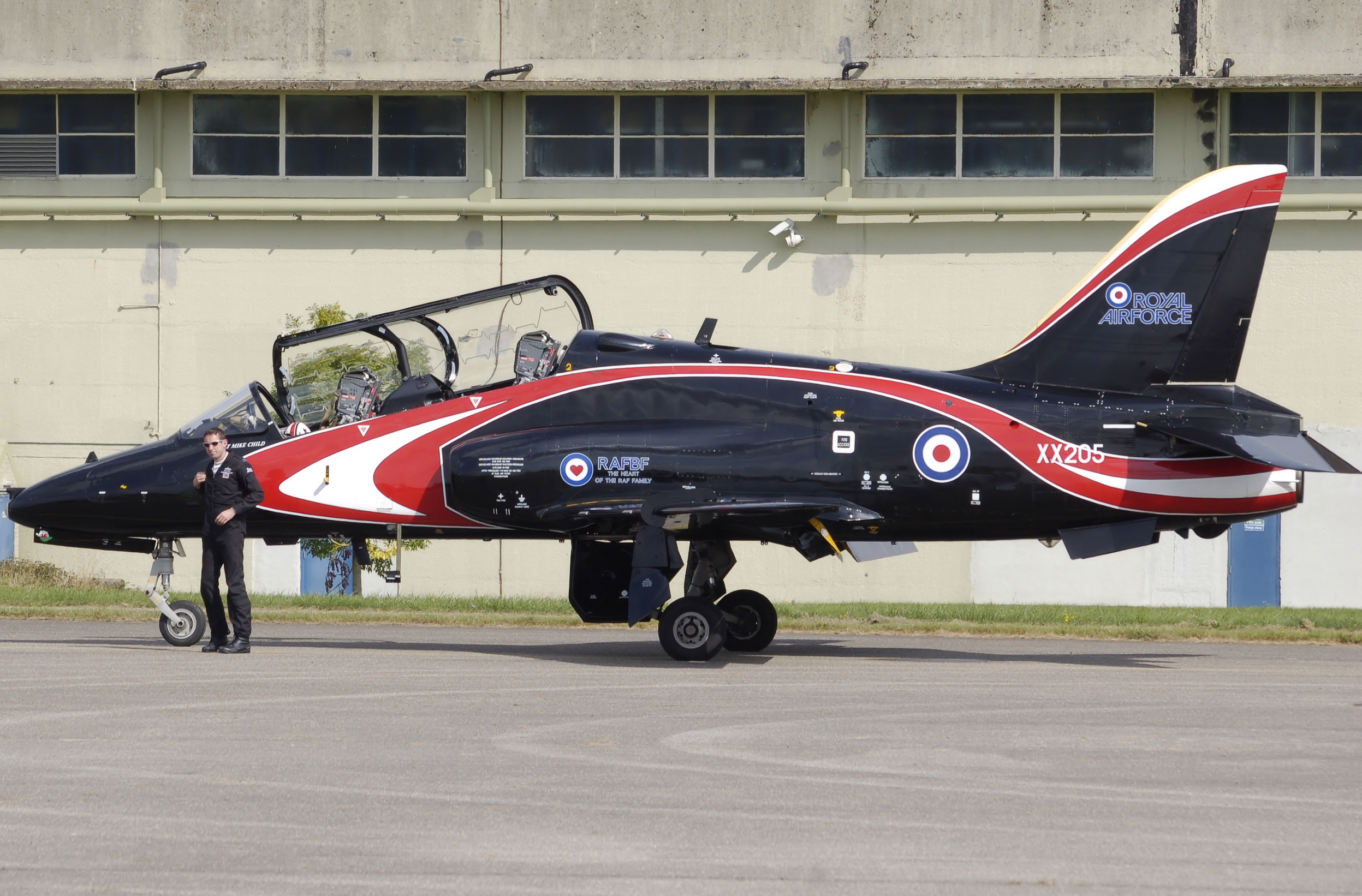
Hawk in British colors. Note that it is a relatively small aircraft

The BAE Hawk trainer/light attack aircraft is manufactured only for export from Britain.

Campaign Against Arms Trade (CAAT) quoted the Sunday Times to say 20 Iraqi technicians came to the UK a £1 billion deal to establish an aircraft industry in Iraq and to build 300 Hawk jets there under licence. Discussions about this had started in December 1980, just five months after Iraq's invasion of Iran, and British Aerospace employees had been regularly visiting Iraq since March 1981. A year later Defence Minister Geoffrey Pattie said: "British Aerospace is negotiating with the Government of Iraq for the sale and local assembly of Hawk aircraft. No agreement has yet been reached."

According to the Financial Times (CAAT), the On 27 July 1989 the Cabinet's Overseas and Defence Committee decided not to allow negotiations on the deal to proceed. The Ministry of Defence and the Department of Trade and Industry were said to have been swayed by BAe's argument that the Hawk was a trainer and that the sale should go ahead. The UK Foreign Office argued that the Iran-Iraq peace was fragile, and the sale to Iraq might prevent repairing relations with Iran.

== Air defence ==
CAAT cited several British newspapers regarding the July 1981 involvement, with the Iran–Iraq War underway, of Douglas Hurd, then a Minister of State at the Foreign Office, visited Baghdad to celebrate the anniversary of the Ba'athists' accession to power.

== Missile and related technology ==
=== Supergun ===
In April 1990, Customs officers at Teesport seized steel pipes, which they said were destined for use in an Iraqi "supergun". Prosecutions from these and other cases followed. This was despite a secret meeting attended by three ministers, Alan Clark, William Waldegrave, Baron Waldegrave of North Hill and Lord Trefgarne, where it was agreed guidelines to Iraq should be relaxed. This change was never announced in Parliament.

== Chemical warfare ==
In 1985 a £14m chlorine plant known as "Falluja 2", built by Uhde Ltd, a UK subsidiary of a German company, was given financial guarantees by the UK's Export Credits Guarantee Department despite official UK recognition of a "strong possibility" the plant would be used to make mustard gas. The guarantees led to UK government payment of £300,000 to Uhde in 1990 after completion of the plant was interrupted by the first Persian Gulf War. The plant was later highlighted by the US government as part of arguing for the legitimacy of the 2003 invasion of Iraq.

Britain was said to have exported thiodiglycol (a mustard gas precursor) and thionyl chloride (a nerve gas precursor) to Iraq in 1988 and 1989.

== See also ==
- International aid to combatants in the Iran–Iraq War
- Project Babylon
- Scott Report
