= The Afghan =

2006 novel by Frederick Forsyth

- First edition (UK)
- Author: Frederick Forsyth
- Language: English
- Genre: Thriller
- Publisher: Bantam Press
- Publication date: 2006
- Publication place: United Kingdom
- Media type: Print (hardback & paperback)
- Pages: 343
- ISBN: 0-593-05725-2

The Afghan is a 2006 thriller novel by British writer Frederick Forsyth.

== Plot summary ==
A joint operation by MI6, the CIA, and Pakistan's ISI against al Qaeda operatives in Pakistan uncovers documents concerning a planned terrorist attack codenamed "al-Isra". The cryptic nature of the codename triggers further investigations authorised at the most senior level.

Now eager to learn more about al Qaeda's plans for al-Isra, MI6 and CIA scramble to find out information through their various contacts, including inserting an operative close enough into the terror network's confidence. Middle Eastern scholar Dr. Terry Martin, who is part of a special committee studying the Koran for references to al-Isra, accidentally mentions that his elder brother Mike, a retired Paras and SAS officer, can pass for an Afghan native; Mike's chestnut-brown complexion, which he inherited from his mother and maternal grandmother, is indeed a perfect match. The elder Martin also has a near-perfect command of Arabic and Pashto, based from his tour of duty in Afghanistan supporting the Mujahideen.

Interested with Mike's appearance, the CIA and MI6 recall him to infiltrate al-Qaeda by assuming the identity of Izmat Khan, a Taliban commander now detained at Guantanamo Bay. It is revealed that Khan and Mike share a common past – he saved the wounded Khan from an attack by Soviet helicopters and brought him to a clinic run by Ayman al Zawahiri, where he also meets "the sheikh", Osama bin Laden. A wayward US missile that was launched as part of a strike in retaliation for the 1998 East Africa bombings hits a slope in the Tora Bora, resulting in a landslide that buries Khan's village and his entire family; he swears revenge against the US, joining the Taliban in the process. He is later caught after the Battle of Qala-i-Jangi.

Mike is trained to fully assume Khan's identity (right down to saying Muslim prayers in Pashto) while the real Khan is slated for repatriation to Afghanistan. CIA operatives kidnap Khan and bring him to a secret safehouse in Washington State, with Mike in his place. The ISI engineer Mike's escape after his arrival in Afghanistan and he makes his way back to al Qaeda safe houses in Pakistan and the UAE, where he is accepted as a compatriot after extensive verification by al-Qaeda representatives. The interrogation delves into every chapter of Khan's life, which includes showing his old wound in Afghanistan.

Now accepted into al-Qaeda's fold as Izmat Khan, Mike volunteers to join the operating team for al-Isra. Part of the plan calls for an al-Qaeda agent posing as a businessman to charter a freighter and a tanker carrying liquid petroleum gas. The freighter is later captured by pirates and sank with all hands killed while the tanker is brought to a secret place in Borneo and refitted as the freighter. Another group hijacks a cargo ship in the Caribbean, although this is intended to serve as a decoy. Martin successfully alerts his handlers to the general nature of the threat, but is left incommunicado for several weeks as the ship steams to the US East Coast through the Indian Ocean (maritime authorities search all ships in the Pacific). A CIA official involved with planning Mike's mission drops hints about the al-Isra attack possibly a repeat of the 1917 explosion in Halifax, Nova Scotia.

Meanwhile, an aircraft on approach to McChord Air Force Base develops engine trouble and accidentally crashes into the CIA safehouse, blasting open Khan's cell and giving him an opportunity to escape his captors. A Special Forces team chases Khan across the Cascades and kills him as he uses a public phone in Canada to call his allies.

Eventually, the tanker reaches the mid-Atlantic, where a G8 summit is being held on the Queen Mary 2. Martin finally learns that the terrorists intend to release and then ignite the gas on board the tanker, which could incinerate the liner as it passed within range. Martin's last-minute heroism, quick reflexes and self-sacrifice prevent a tragedy.

== Background ==
The Afghan can be seen as a sequel to The Fist of God, with the re-appearance of the Martin brothers. However, due to unexplained reasons, Forsyth rewrote the brothers' backstory as explained in The Fist of God. In that book, their parents got married in Iraq in 1952 with Mike being born in 1953 and Terry in 1955. In The Afghan, the couple waited ten years before deciding to have children. As a result, Mike's military record is adjusted ten years forward, with his career now including stints in Northern Ireland, Sierra Leone and Afghanistan – he was part of the relieving force during the Battle of Qala-i-Jangi. The story relationship with The Fist of God ends when Mike escapes Iraq and is almost killed by Foreign Legionnaires patrolling the border with no details are alluded to anything connected to the Supergun.

== Critical reception ==
The book reaped mixed reviews. Kirkus Reviews labelled the book as a "post 9/11 apocalyptic western."
