= The Fist of God =

1994 novel by Frederick Forsyth

- First edition (UK)
- Author: Frederick Forsyth
- Language: English
- Genre: Thriller
- Publisher: Bantam Press
- Publication date: 1994
- Publication place: United Kingdom
- Media type: Print (hardback & paperback)
- ISBN: 0-593-02798-1

The Fist of God is a 1994 suspense novel by British writer Frederick Forsyth, with a fictitious retelling of the Iraqi Project Babylon and the resulting "supergun".

Featuring a story set during the Persian Gulf War, the novel details an Allied effort to find the suspected Iraqi nuclear weapon. The story features the brothers Mike and Terry Martin who also appear in Forsyth's 2006 novel The Afghan.

== Plot ==
Dr. Gerald Bull designs a supergun codenamed Project Babylon for Iraq. He believes that it is for launching satellites and not military purposes, since its inability to traverse or change angle of elevation/depression required it to be disassembled and reassembled to change targets, which made it vulnerable to location and destruction. Bull discovers the true purpose of the gun shortly before being assassinated by his paymasters. His death is variously attributed by the media to the Mossad, the Central Intelligence Agency (CIA), or numerous other intelligence organisations.

Iraq's invasion of Kuwait creates a need for the British and Americans to acquire top-level intelligence on the ground. Major Mike Martin of the Special Air Service (SAS) is seconded to SIS to collaborate with the Kuwaiti resistance. Mike speaks fluent Arabic and can physically pass as an Arab. His brother Terry, an expert in Arab military studies, works with the Medusa Committee, a joint British-American panel investigating Iraq's weapons of mass destruction.

The CIA and SIS lack assets deep inside the Iraqi government and the Mossad, reluctant to admit they have active agents there, identify one agent codenamed "Jericho" who they've been paying for information through an account in Vienna. He has been silent since the invasion began. Israel is forced to stay out of the war to prevent alienating Arab countries in the Coalition, and they agree to let the Americans run Jericho, if they can find him. Mike Martin is sent to Iraq to run Jericho through a series of dead drops while working a cover job as a house gardener for the Soviet Union's First Secretary to the Soviet Embassy in Baghdad.

The Medusa Committee concludes Iraq's biological weapons capability is not a threat and, despite possessing enough yellowcake, haven't had time to produce weapons-grade uranium-235 for an atomic bomb. Assessing Iraqi chemical weapons as a significant threat, the Americans warn the Iraqi government they will attack Baghdad with nuclear weapons if Iraq deploys chemical weapons.

When an over-zealous American F-15E pilot, frustrated at an aborted mission, drops his bombs on an unauthorized building, reconnaissance photographs reveal strange metal discs underneath the roof. A retired Manhattan Project employee at the Lawrence Livermore National Laboratory in California identifies the discs as Calutrons (California Cyclotrons), a low-tech solution to refining uranium. Mike Martin learns that had Iraq used them in conjunction with their existing centrifuges, they could already have made a nuclear bomb.

Jericho identifies a factory where such a bomb was put together and it is destroyed but he later reports the weapon had already been moved to a place called the "Qa'ala" (Fortress). Mike Martin offers him $3 million above the $5 million already paid to him to identify the bomb's new location. The Americans remain skeptical, thinking such a bomb too heavy to deploy by Scud missile and no Iraqi plane could penetrate Coalition air supremacy to drop it. The Iraqi super-cannon, hidden in an undisclosed location, remains a threat. It was designed to fire an atomic weapon called "The Fist of God" into Saudi Arabia if the Coalition launched the ground phase of Desert Storm. The blast would kill approximately 100,000 soldiers, and the radioactive fallout would be carried into Iran.

Jericho reports the cannon is somewhere in the Jebal al-Hamreen mountains in eastern Iraq. Mike Martin narrowly escapes capture by Iraqi counter-intelligence for transmitting Jericho's messages, and leaves Iraq. Martin then volunteers to return to Iraq by parachute with a British SAS team to destroy the cannon. The Americans agree to delay the ground invasion by two days. The SAS squad lands, marks the target and a lone American F-15 destroys the cannon. General Norman Schwarzkopf orders the ground attack to liberate Kuwait to commence.

Pressured to admit Jericho's existence, the Israelis execute "Operation Joshua" to infiltrate the Viennese bank holding Jericho's account and seize the funds. An agent seduces the bank manager's secretary, members of the Jewish diaspora such as sayanim helps the Mossad access and photograph the details of the Jericho account, and the Israeli government recovers the entire reward rendered to Jericho. The secretary commits suicide when she realizes her "lover" had used her to obtain the information. Jericho, revealed to be AMAM director Brigadier Omar Khatib, is picked up by Mossad agents masquerading as American military intelligence. He's flown out of Iraq, drugged, and thrown into the sea from 10,000 feet.

== Subplots ==
Aside from the main plot involving Martin and the Mossad operation in Vienna, there are other subplots that eventually tie themselves into the story. These include a prostitute servicing the commander of Iraq's armoured forces who is also a spy for the Iraqi counter-intelligence head, the backgrounds of an Iraqi Air Force pilot and his brother, the chief of Iraq's counter-intelligence, and the USAF pilot who bombs the Iraqi factory. The Iraqi Air Force pilot, his brother, and the Iraqi counter-intelligence head are revealed to be former elementary school classmates of the Martin brothers.

== Connection with other Forsyth books ==
- The characters of Fist re-appear or are referenced in two other of Forsyth's novels:
  - Tim Nathanson, the weapons systems officer of the Strike Eagle pilot who bombed the Iraqi factory and the Qa'ala, is the son of top American banker Saul Nathanson. He dies after the climax of the book. The elder Nathanson reflects on his son's death in Icon.
  - The Martin brothers later appear in The Afghan.
- In his previous novel, The Deceiver, Forsyth depicts the "trial" of a middle-aged S.I.S. operative who is regarded as an anachronistic "menace" by his younger, politicking superior. The operative's private opinion of his superior is that he, and too many others like him in the S.I.S., are over-awed by the C.I.A.'s use of technology (Sigint and satellite photography), and foolishly regard humint (human agents) as a thing of the past. In The Fist of God, Forsyth paints several comical scenes in which the C.I.A. and U.S. military realize that they have enough satellite photos and signal intercepts "to drown in," yet none of it offers any insight into the Iraqis' true intentions, and they begin searching desperately for a way to infiltrate Saddam Hussein's regime with a living agent.
  - In his afterword to The Fist of God, Forsyth makes his point explicit, that HUMINT will always be a necessary part of espionage.
- In Avenger, Forsyth explains how the American attempt to expel Iraq from Kuwait becomes a justification for Osama bin Laden to attack the United States. The Fist of God is mostly about how Iraq has attacked Kuwait and the Coalition's offense against Saddam Hussein, who is in control of Iraq.

== Background ==
Set against the backdrop of the Gulf War, the novel features several real-life characters central to the conflict. The assassination of Gerald Bull is central to the novel.

=== Principal characters ===
American:

- George Bush – U.S. President
- James Baker – Secretary of State
- Brent Scowcroft – head, National Security Council
- Norman Schwarzkopf – commander, Coalition Forces
- Chuck Horner – commander, Coalition air forces
- Don Walker - Weapons Systems Officer, 515th Squadron

Canadian:

- Gerald Bull – Engineer of the supergun

British:

- Margaret Thatcher – British Prime Minister
- Gen. Sir Peter de la Billière – Commander, British Forces, Gulf Theater
- John Major – Chancellor of the Exchequer
- Sir Colin McColl - Chief, Secret Intelligence Service
- Sir Paul Spruce - Chairman, British Medusa Committee
- Brigadier J.P. Lovat - Director, Special Forces
- Col. Bruce Craig - Commanding Officer, 22nd Special Air Service Regiment
- Maj. Michael Martin - Major, Special Air Service
- Maj. 'Sparky' Low - Special Air Service Officer, Khafji
- Dr. Terry Martin - Academic and Arabist, Mike Martin's brother
- Stephen Laing - Director of Operations, Mid-East Division, Secret Intelligence Service
- Simon Paxman - Head of Iraq Desk, Secret Intelligence Service
- Stuart Harris - British businessman, Baghdad
- Julian Gray - Head of Station, Secret Intelligence Service, Riyadh
- Dr. Bryant - Bacteriologist, Medusa Committee
- Dr. Reinhart - Poison gas expert, Medusa Committee
- Dr. John Hipwell - Nuclear expert, Medusa Committee
- Sean Plummer - Head of Arab Service, Government Communication Headquarters
- Wg Cdr Philip Curzon - Commanding Officer, 608th Squadron, Royal Air Force
- Sqn Ldr Lofty Williamson - Pilot, 608th Squadron, Royal Air Force
- Flt Lt Sid Blair - Williamson's navigator
- Flt Lt Peter Johns - Pilot, 608th Squadron
- Flt Lt Nicholas Tyne - John's navigator
- Sgt Peter Stephenson - Special Air Service man
- Cpl Benjamin Eastman - Special Air Service man
- Cpl Kevin North - Special Air Service man

In the novel, a British Tornado aircraft is shot down while on a bombing mission. The pilot and navigator are named "Peter Johns" and "Nicky Tyne" – these are references to John Peters and John Nichol (from Tyneside), the crew of an actual Tornado raid which was downed over Iraq during the Gulf War.

Iraqi:

- Saddam Hussein – President
- Izzat Ibrahim – Deputy President
- Hussein Kamil - Saddam's son-in-law, head of MIMI
- Taha Ramadam – Prime Minister
- Sadoun Hammadi – Deputy Premier
- Tariq Aziz – Foreign Minister
- Ali Hassan Majid - Governor-General, occupied Kuwait
- Gen. Saadi Tumah Abbas - Commander, Republican Guard
- Gen. Ali Musuli - Commander, Engineering Corps
- Gen. Abdullah Kadiri - Commander, Armoured Corps
- Dr. Amer Saadi - Deputy to Hussein Kamil
- Brigadier Hassan Rahmani - Chief, Counter-intelligence
- Dr. Ismail Ubaidi - Chief, Foreign Espionage
- Brigadier Omar Khatib - Chief, Secret Police (Amn-al-Amm)
- Col. Osman Badri - Colonel, Combat Engineers
- Col. Abdelkarim Badri - Colonel, pilot in Iraqi Air Force, Osman's brother
- Dr. Jaafar al-Jaafar - Head, nuclear program
- Col. Sabaawi - Secret Police Chief, occupied Kuwait
- Dr. Salah Siddiqui - Nuclear engineer

Kuwaitis:

- Khaled al-Khalifa - Captain, pilot of the Kuwaiti Air Force
- Ahmed al-Khalifa - Khaled's father, merchant
- Col. Abu Fouad - Head, resistance movement
- Asrar Qabandi - Heroine of resistance

Israeli:

- Yitzhak Shamir – Prime Minister
- Benjamin Netanyahu – Deputy Foreign Minister
- General Yaacov 'Kobi' Dror - Head of Mossad
- Sami Gershon - Head, Combatants Division, Mossad
- David Sharon - Head, Iraq Desk, Mossad
- Gideon 'Gidi' Barzilai - Mission controller, 'Operation Joshua'
- Dr. Moshe Hadari - Arabist, Tel Aviv University
- Avi Herzog - Mossad agent in Vienna

Vienesse:

- Wolfgang Gemutlich - Vice-president, Winkler Bank
- Edith Hardenberg - Gemutlich's secretary

== Critical reception ==
The novel received good reviews.

Kirkus Reviews cited the novel has enough material to satisfy espionage thriller fans with its believability about what may have happened behind the scenes of the Gulf War.

People claimed the novel packs "derring-do entertainment with a political message."

Publishers Weekly lauded the novel for fusing historical facts into a gripping what-if thriller.
