= Public interest immunity =

Principle of the English law of evidence

Public interest immunity (PII), previously known as Crown privilege, is a principle of English common law under which the English courts can grant a court order allowing one litigant to refrain from disclosing evidence to the other litigants where disclosure would be damaging to the public interest. This is an exception to the usual rule that all parties in litigation must disclose any evidence that is relevant to the proceedings. In making a PII order, the court has to balance the public interest in the administration of justice (which demands that relevant material is available to the parties to litigation) and the public interest in maintaining the confidentiality of certain documents whose disclosure would be damaging. PII orders have been used in criminal law against large organised criminal outfits and drug dealers where the identity of paid police informants could be at risk.

== Seeking the order ==
An order that PII applies would usually be sought by the British government to protect official secrets, and so can be perceived as a gagging order. Where a minister believes that PII applies, he signs a PII certificate, which then allows the court to make the final decision on whether the balance of public interest was in favour of disclosure or not. Generally, a court will allow a claim of PII without inspecting the documents: only where there is some doubt will the court inspect the documents to decide whether PII applies.

Originally, a government minister was under a duty to advance a PII point where PII could be relevant, and the court took a certificate from a minister claiming PII as final and conclusive. However, over time, there has been an increase in both the ability of a minister to make a disclosure, notwithstanding the potential application of PII, and the ability of the courts to review a claim of PII. In Conway v Rimmer [1968], the House of Lords held that the courts retained the final decision on whether PII should be upheld, and, in R v Chief Constable of West Midlands, ex parte Wiley [1995], the House of Lords decided that a minister could discharge his duty by making his own judgment of where the public interest lies (that is, to disclose or to assert PII). In practice, this is thought to have led to a reduction in the number of cases when PII is asserted.

== History ==
PII was previously known as Crown privilege, and derived from the same principle as the sovereign immunity of the Crown from prosecution before the Crown Proceedings Act 1947. However, PII is not limited to the Crown (see the NSPCC case mentioned below), and cannot be waived save in exceptional circumstances.

A number of PII certificates were signed in relation to the prosecutions of individuals involved in the Matrix Churchill "Arms to Iraq" case, a subject that was subsequently investigated in the Scott Report.

=== Examples ===
- Duncan v Cammell Laird and Co Ltd [1942] AC 624: The submarine HMS Thetis sank on 1 June 1939 during sea trials with the loss of 99 lives. The families of the sailors who had been killed in the disaster claimed damages from the builders, Cammell Laird. The House of Lords upheld a certificate issued by the Admiralty claiming PII in relation to the plans of the submarine. The House of Lords also held that the courts should take a PII certificate at face value.
- Tomlinson v HMG: In 1995, former MI6 officer Richard Tomlinson attempted to bring MI6 before an employment tribunal to seek compensation for unfair dismissal. MI6 argued that this would "damage national security" and obtained a PII certificate from the then foreign secretary Malcolm Rifkind to block Tomlinson's application. Tomlinson argued vociferously that the real reason that MI6 obtained the PII certificate was to cover up their incompetent and dishonest personnel management.
- Conway v Rimmer (1968): The House of Lords held that the courts are the final arbiters of whether PII applies or not.
- D v National Society for the Prevention of Cruelty to Children [1978] AC 171: The NSPCC investigated an allegation that D was mistreating her child. D claimed damages, and sought documents from the NSPCC to identify who had made the allegation. The House of Lords upheld the NSPCC's claim of PII, since its legitimate role in protecting the welfare of children was clearly in the public interest and would be threatened by disclosure.
- Air Canada v Secretary of State for Trade [1983] 2 AC 384: A group of airlines claimed that the British Airports Authority had unlawfully increased landing fees at the instigation of a government minister. The minister disclosed some documents, but claimed PII in respect of others. The House of Lords decided not to inspect the disputed documents, holding that inspection was only required if they were "reasonably likely" to assist or damage a party's case.
- R v Chief Constable of West Midlands, ex parte Wiley [1995] 1 AC 274: The House of Lords decided that a minister could discharge his duty by making his own judgment of where the public interest lies, and was not obliged to claim PII in all cases where it may be applicable.
- The Scott Inquiry in 1996 found that public interest immunity certificates had been issued which withheld from defence counsel certain documents which would have exonerated the defendants in the Matrix Churchill trial.
- R v Paul Burrell (2002): A public interest immunity certificate allowed the prosecution to apply to the judge for a ruling that disclosure of certain information would be harmful to the public interest and should not be made public.
- R v Hicks, Nute and Rowe (2002): A public interest immunity certificate was presented to the court by the Crown Prosecution Service after about ten minutes of this hearing. A possible reason for the introduction of the PII certificate was that the Duchy of Cornwall refused to reveal the circumstances under which it transferred several of its properties (including Tintagel Castle) to the care of English Heritage.
- R v Yam (2008): In December 2007 the Crown Prosecution Service indicated it would ask for the trial of Wang Yam for the murder of Allan Chappelow, burglary and deception to be held in camera, making it the first UK murder trial ever heard behind closed doors without access by press or public. A public interest immunity certificate was sought by the Home Secretary Jacqui Smith; it was reported by The Times on 13 December 2007 that the grounds were "on the basis of protecting national security interests and to protect the identity of informants". A further order was made under the Contempt of Court Act 1981 prohibiting the press from any speculation as to the reasons for parts of the trial being held in private. In the Court of Appeal on 28 January, the "gagging order" was upheld, with the Lord Chief Justice insisting that a fair trial would be possible even if some or all of it is held in camera.
- R (Mohamed) v Foreign Secretary (2010): the High Court ordered the Foreign Secretary to disclose evidence of the applicant's abuse by US authorities to his counsel, but prohibited its publication on public interest grounds.
- During the public inquiry into the Horizon scandal, it came to light that two lawyers for the Post Office who were conducting a prosecution of a sub-postmaster in Birmingham crown court had persuaded the judge to allow them, on grounds of public interest immunity, not to disclose to the defence a report by forensic accountants which alleged prosecutorial misconduct by the Post Office in similar cases. This was unusual in that Post Office Ltd was a private company, albeit one entrusted with a public function.

== European Convention on Human Rights ==
Article 6 of the European Convention on Human Rights protects the right to a fair trial; an "implied" right stemming from this is that of "equality of arms" – the idea that hearings should be adversarial and both parties should have access to the same evidence and witnesses. The European Court of Human Rights has held that Article 6 (especially the "implied" rights) is not an absolute right and that measures restricting the rights of the defence so as to safeguard an important public interest are lawful if "strictly necessary".

It is of note that fewer PII certificates have been issued in recent years. For example, MI6 have not succeeded in obtaining a PII certificate since the 1995 Tomlinson case, and have thus been subject to court scrutiny for investigations such as the inquest into the death of the Princess of Wales, and allegations that their officers partook in torture.

== See also ==
- English law
- State secrets privilege – similar doctrine under United States law
- Executive privilege – similar doctrine under United States law
- Deliberative process privilege – similar doctrine under United States law
