= Mike Martin (character) =

Literary character in novels by Frederick Forsyth

Mike Martin is the protagonist in two novels, The Fist of God (1994) and The Afghan (2006) by Frederick Forsyth.

Martin is an Englishman who looks remarkably Arab because his maternal grandmother (mentioned in the novel as "Indira Bohse" - likely to be Indira Bose) was Bengali.

His father (Nigel Martin) was an accountant in an unnamed English Oil Company and his mother (half-Indian Susan Granger) was an air-stewardess with BOAC. His father was posted in the Middle East and so he (and his brother) grew up in Baghdad, becoming fluent in Arabic and English. After moving to England during a time of great political uncertainty in Iraq, he joined the Paras at the age of 19, and soon became an officer. Later, he was accepted into the Special Air Service.

In his late 30s, he was employed by the Secret Intelligence Service during Operation Desert Shield to lead the Kuwaiti resistance disguised as a Bedouin. Shortly after he was sent to run the agent "Jericho", along with the CIA, in Baghdad. Upon learning of the location of the Fist of God, he leads the SAS patrol that paints it for an airstrike.

He retired from the army after 25 years of service. However, he was called by Secret Intelligence Service and Central Intelligence to infiltrate the Al-Qaeda using his knowledge from the 1980s Mujahideen resistance-assistance to his advantage.

After several months successfully undercover inside Al-Qaeda, he sacrificed his life in order to stop an attack against the ocean liner Queen Mary 2, where the G8 summit was being held.

== Sources ==
- The Fist of God
- The Afghan
