= Sheffield Forgemasters =

Heavy engineering firm located in Sheffield

- Company type: Limited company
- Industry: Engineering
- Founded: 1805
- Headquarters: Sheffield, England, UK
- Key people: Gary Nutter (CEO); Patrick Davison (CFO); Gareth Barker (COO)
- Products: Steel forgings Steel castings Consultancy; R&D
- Services: Steel Casting and Forgings
- Owner: UK Government Investments
- Parent: Ministry of Defence
- Website: www.sheffieldforgemasters.com

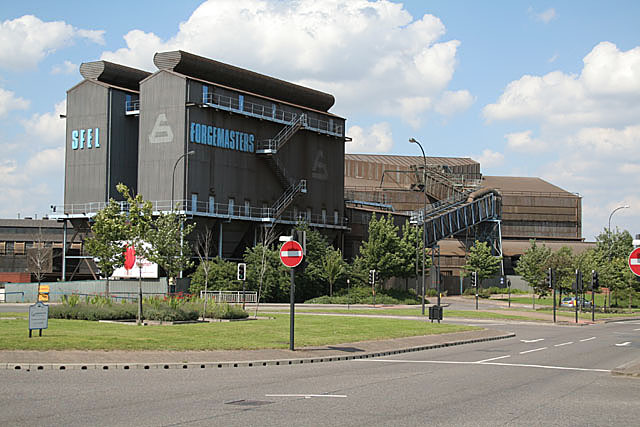
Electric arc furnaces steel mill at the Sheffield Forgemaster complex in Brightside. The furnaces are contained in the building at the rear. The tall buildings at the front filter the dust and gases from the furnaces.

Sheffield Forgemasters is a British heavy engineering firm that is based in Sheffield, South Yorkshire, England. The state-owned company specialises in the production of large bespoke steel castings and forgings, as well as standard rolls, ingots and bars. The company was nationalised in July 2021, becoming wholly owned by the UK's Ministry of Defence.

== History ==
=== Origins and early years ===
Sheffield Forgemasters traces its origins to a 1750s blacksmith forge, and then Naylor Vickers and Co. founded by George Naylor and Edward Vickers, the predecessor of Vickers Limited. Vickers built the River Don Works in 1865. In 1983, the River Don Works, then part of state-owned British Steel, merged with Firth Brown Steels to create Sheffield Forgemasters.

During the 1980s, Forgemasters was one of several British companies that manufactured components destined for the Iraqi Project Babylon "supergun", which it had believed were for a petrochemical refinery. The resulting government investigation exonerated the company's directors of wrongdoing; the incident became known as the Supergun affair.

In mid-1997, Forgemasters announced a plan to demerge its aerospace and engineering divisions into two separate companies; this move was stated to be in preparation for their flotation. During the following year, the company was not only divided but sold to two separate American companies. Allegheny Teledyne acquired the aerospace business, while Atchison Casting Corp bought the River Don and Rolls businesses; it was the latter that retained the Sheffield Forgemasters name. Over the following four years, Atchison invested $64 million (£39 million) in improving the firm's technology and equipment.

During 1999, the firm started to supply rolled steel to the Russian steel company Severstal; by the mid-2010s, Forgemasters was reportedly supplying three-quarters of Severstal's demand for this product.

=== 2000s–2010s ===
During 2002, amid poor economic conditions, Forgemasters was reportedly to be approaching liquidation. One year later, American parent company Atchison went bankrupt, leading to its acquisition by the investment firm KPS later that same year. During 2005, Graham Honeyman led a successful effort to buy Forgemasters, after which Honeyman became the company's chief executive as well as its majority shareholder.

Amid severe flooding in the summer of 2007, Forgemasters experienced a work stoppage after its works were inundated by the River Don. Three weeks after the event, repairs were ahead of schedule and the works were approaching full production.

In the late 2000s, Forgemasters launched an effort to acquire a 15,000 tonne forging press for manufacturing ultra-large civil nuclear components. By March 2010, the company had secured £140 million in funding over two years, which included an £80 million loan from the British government. Plans to acquire the press were ultimately suspended. The government loan was cancelled in June 2010 with a change of government. One year later, Forgemasters declined to apply for a new loan as foreign competitors were already building such presses while the Fukushima Daiichi nuclear disaster had caused uncertainty in the civil nuclear market.

Throughout the 2010s, Forgemasters was involved in numerous maritime projects. In May 2014, the firm joined the Wales Tidal Industry Advisory Group, which sought to realise the commercial benefits of the proposed Swansea Bay Tidal Lagoon. In mid 2017, Vulcan SFM (Forgemasters' offshore division) was awarded a £5.5 million contract by Samsung Heavy Industries to produce 73 steel castings for a semi-submersible oil platform. Furthermore, Forgemasters produced components, such as subsea emergency repair clamp bodies, for use on Nord Stream 1, the world’s longest subsea gas pipeline.

=== Financial difficulties and nationalisation ===
Along with the decline of the wider British steel industry throughout the 2010s, Forgemasters was no exception to this trend. The firm reported its first operating loss, of £9.4 million, since separating from Atchison in the 14 months leading to December 2014. During January 2016, the company announced plans to reduce its workforce from 800 to 700. The company's financial health attracted attention due to its involvement in Britain's nuclear submarine programme.

During 2016, Forgemasters obtained a £30 million loan from the American bank Wells Fargo. The loan was underwritten by nuclear submarine contractors BAE Systems, Babcock International and Rolls-Royce Marine Power, in an arrangement negotiated by the British Ministry of Defence (MoD); the intervention forestalled Chinese investment and control in the company. In March 2018, the arrangement was due to expire in July 2019; Sky News reported that the underwriters were seeking a replacement to Honeyman, possibly as a precondition for renewal. In July 2018, Honeyman was replaced as Forgemasters' chief executive by David Bond, formerly of BAE Systems.

In December 2020, Britain's Ministry of Defence (MoD) and Forgemasters were in preliminary talks for the nationalisation of the company. In July 2021, the UK government announced that the MoD had launched an offer to take over the company for £2.56 million, and intended to invest a further £400 million over the next decade to support defence outputs. Investment was to reportedly include a new heavy forge line and flood alleviation measures. The existing senior management continued to run the company alongside two new non-executive directors. At the time, the long term intention of the British government was to eventually privatise Forgemasters; no timeframe has been specified for this.

=== Recent activities ===
During March 2022, the British government instructed Forgemasters to end its supply contract with the Russian energy firm Gazprom as a result of the Russian invasion of Ukraine. The company had already stopped any sales business with Russia by that date. Later that same year, Forgemasters commenced the fabrication of an at-scale fusion vessel trial ring for a demonstration machine for General Fusion.

In July 2024, the MOD announced that it would revive the ability to produce forgings for large caliber gun barrels in collaboration with Sheffield Forgemasters. In a separate announcement, the MoD revealed an arrangement with Forgemasters to repair Ukrainian vehicles. That same month, newly-installed Secretary for Defence John Healey toured the Forgemasters plant with his Australian counterpart Richard Marles in the framework of the AUKUS partnership. In January 2025, the British government awarded a contract to the defence firm BAE Systems to produce artillery barrels for Ukraine; BAE has stated their intention to work with Sheffield Forgemasters to produce the barrel forgings.

== Capabilities ==
The company specialises in forged and cast steel components for the defence, engineering, nuclear, offshore, petrochemical and steel processing industries worldwide.

The company received the American Society of Mechanical Engineers N-stamp accreditation for critical nuclear components in 1992, having produced major components for the Astute-class submarines and the civil nuclear industry, including Sizewell B, the UK's only pressurised water reactor. The accreditation lapsed some years later, with the lack of nuclear work. In 2023, the company was reportedly working to regain ASME status for heavy forgings and castings to the civil nuclear market and to position itself for anticipated expansion of civil nuclear capacity in the UK. During mid 2020s, Forgemasters started using a new electron beam-based welding process that reduced the timescale involved in the construction of compact nuclear reactors from 150 days to two hours.

Sheffield Forgemasters currently has the capacity for pouring the largest single casting (570 tonnes) in Europe. The two forging presses in use can exert a force of 4,500 tonnes and 10,000 tonnes on a billet of steel. The 4,500 tonne press was installed in 2010 to replace a 1,500 tonne press which dated back to 1897 and was originally steam powered, and after several upgrades became hydraulically operated.
