= Scott Report =

Inquiry Arms report

The Scott Report (the Report of the Inquiry into the Export of Defence Equipment and Dual-Use Goods to Iraq and Related Prosecutions) was a judicial inquiry commissioned in 1992 after reports surfaced of previously restricted arms sales to Iraq in the 1980s by British companies. The report was conducted by Sir Richard Scott, then a Lord Justice of Appeal. It was published in 1996. Much of the report was classified as secret.

== Background ==
In the late 1980s, Matrix Churchill, a British (Coventry) aerospace quality machine tools manufacturer that had been bought by the Iraqi government, was exporting machines used in weapons manufacture to Iraq. According to the International Atomic Energy Authority, the products later found in Iraq were among the highest quality of their kind in the world. They were 'dual use' machines that could be used to manufacture weapons parts. Such exports are subject to government control, and Matrix Churchill had the appropriate government permissions, following a 1988 relaxation of export controls. But, this relaxation had not been announced to Parliament. When asked in Parliament whether controls had been relaxed, the Secretary of State for Trade and Industry replied incorrectly that they had not.

Matrix Churchill was contacted by HM Customs and Excise, under suspicion of exporting arms components to Iraq without permission. Although it had this permission, the government denied it, in accordance with its most recently announced policy on the matter. Matrix Churchill's directors were prosecuted in 1991 by Customs and Excise for breaching export controls.

The trial did not go well for the government. The trial judge overturned the government's use of public interest immunity certificates intended to suppress some critical evidence (purportedly on grounds of national security). The court required the government to hand over these materials to the defence. The trial collapsed when former minister Alan Clark admitted he had been 'economical with the actualité' in answer to parliamentary questions regarding what he knew about export licenses to Iraq.

== Report ==
The Scott Report represents possibly the most exhaustive study produced to that date of the individual responsibility of ministers to Parliament. Scott comments on the difficulty of extracting from departments the required documents (some 130,000 of them in all) and notes that Customs and Excise could not find out what Ministry of Defence export policy was, and that intelligence reports were not passed on to those who needed to know. The Economist commented that "Sir Richard exposed an excessively secretive government machine, riddled with incompetence, slippery with the truth and willing to mislead Parliament".

The report characterised the nature of the government as:

The main objectives of governments are the implementation of their policies and the discomfiture of opposition; they do not submit with enthusiasm to the restraints of accountability … governments are little disposed to volunteer information that may expose them to criticism … The enforcement of accountability depends largely on the ability of Parliament to prise information from governments which are inclined to be defensively secretive where they are most vulnerable to challenge.

Scott identified three main areas of democratic concern. First, the Import, Export and Customs Powers (Defence) Act 1939 was emergency legislation passed at the outbreak of the Second World War. It allowed the government to issue regulations that were not subject to resolution by Parliament, for the duration of the emergency, which made it a criminal offence to export particular goods to particular countries. While the Act should have been lapsed in 1945, it remained in force. It was modified in 1990 so as to become part of the Import and Export Control Act 1990.

The second area was the failure of ministerial accountability; the government had failed to uphold the principle that "for every action of a servant of the crown a minister is answerable to Parliament".

The third area was that of public-interest immunity certificates, which had been issued during the Matrix Churchill trial. As a result of these certificates, innocent men were in danger of being sent to prison, because the government would not allow the defence counsel to see the documents that would exonerate their clients. While some of these documents contained potentially sensitive intelligence material, many were simply internal communications. The Scott report said that the certificates were intended to protect the ministers and civil servants who had written the communications, rather than the public interest.

Scott says:

The government is entirely frank in its desire to continue using "class" claims in order to protect communications between ministers and civil servants from disclosure in litigation. One argument put forward is that, unless these communications are protected, the necessary candour between ministers and civil servants will suffer. I have to say that I regard this "candour" argument … as unacceptable.

== Publication ==
The publication of the report was seen by many as the nadir of the Second Major ministry. Prior to the report's publication, those ministers who were criticised were given the opportunity to comment and request revisions. The 1,806-page report was published at 3:30pm, along with a press pack. The latter included a few relatively positive extracts from the report, presented as if representative of the entire report. Given a then largely pro-government press, this proved effective at stalling an extensive analysis in the media.

The report had to be debated in Parliament. Ministers criticised in the report were given advanced access to the report and briefed extensively on how to defend themselves against the report's criticisms. In contrast, according to senior Labour MP Robin Cook, the opposition were given just two hours to read the million-plus words, during which scrutiny they were supervised and prevented from making copies of the report. Finally, the Prime Minister, John Major, stated that a vote "against" the Government would be in effect a vote of no confidence, ensuring that Conservative MPs would not vote against, while a vote "for" was a vote exonerating the Government of any wrongdoing. Robin Cook worked with a team of researchers to scrutinise the report, and delivered "what was regarded as a bravura performance" in discussing it in total. Nonetheless, the Government won the vote 320–319.

== Sources ==
- Commentary by David Butler
- Q&A: The Scott Report, BBC News
- Robin Cook's obituary, BBC News.
- Brian Thompson and F. F. Ridley (eds.), Under the Scott-light : British government seen through the Scott Report, Oxford University Press, Hansard Society Series in Politics and Government, 1997 ISBN 0-19-922278-9
