= Foreign involvement in the Yemeni civil war (2014–present) =

During the Yemeni civil war, Saudi Arabia led an Arab coalition of nine nations from the Middle East and parts of Africa in response to calls from the internationally recognized pro-Saudi president of Yemen Abdrabbuh Mansour Hadi for military support after he was ousted by the Houthi movement due to economic and political grievances, and fled to Saudi Arabia.

Nations such as the United Kingdom and the United States support the Saudi Arabian-led intervention in Yemen primarily through arms sales and technical assistance. France had also made recent military sales to Saudi Arabia. MSF emergency coordinator Karline Kleijer called the US, France and the UK part of the Saudi-led coalition, which imposed the weapons embargo and blocked all ships from entering Yemen with supplies. Human rights groups have criticized the countries for supplying arms, and accuse the coalition of using cluster munitions, which are banned in most countries. Oxfam pointed out that Germany, Iran, and Russia have also reportedly sold arms to the conflicting forces. Tariq Riebl, head of programmes in Yemen for Oxfam, said, "it's difficult to argue that a weapon sold to Saudi Arabia would not in some way be used in Yemen," or "if it's not used in Yemen it enables the country to use other weapons in Yemen." Amnesty International urged the US and the UK to stop supplying arms to Saudi Arabia and to the Saudi-led coalition.

It called on the international community, including the United States and United Kingdom to stop "providing arms that could be used in the conflict in Yemen". On August 3, 2019, a United Nations report said the US, UK and France may be complicit in committing war crimes in Yemen by selling weapons and providing support to the Saudi-led coalition which is using the deliberate starvation of civilians as a tactic of warfare.

== Arab coalition ==
On 26 March 2015, Saudi Arabia, leading a coalition of nine countries from West Asia and North Africa, staged a military intervention in Yemen at the request of Yemeni president Abdrabbuh Mansur Hadi, who had been ousted from the capital, Sanaa, in September 2014 by Houthis during the Yemeni civil war. Efforts by the United Nations (UN) to facilitate a power sharing arrangement under a new transitional government collapsed, leading to escalating conflict between government forces, Houthi rebels, and other armed groups, which culminated in Hadi fleeing to Saudi Arabia shortly before it began military operations in the country.

The first month of the intervention, codenamed Operation Decisive Storm (Arabic: عملية عاصفة الحزم, romanized: Amaliyyat 'Āṣifat al-Ḥazm), consisted of airstrikes on Houthi rebels and a full blockade. On 22 April, the Saudi-led coalition declared that it had achieved its initial goals and announced Operation Restoring Hope, which would comprise a "combination of political, diplomatic and military action" while continuing "to prevent the Houthi militias from moving or undertaking any operations inside Yemen". Ground forces were subsequently deployed into the country as part of a broader offensive against both Houthi militants and loyalists of Hadi's predecessor, Ali Abdullah Saleh. Owing to Iran's support of these factions, the conflict is widely regarded as part of the broader Saudi-Iran proxy conflict.

Egypt, Morocco, Jordan, Sudan, and the United Arab Emirates provided air and ground forces, while Kuwait, Qatar, Bahrain, and U.S. private military contractor Constellis headed several ground operations. Djibouti, Eritrea, and Somalia opened their airspace, territorial waters, and military bases to coalition forces. At varying stages, the intervention was backed by the United States, United Kingdom, France, Germany, and Canada. The U.S. provided intelligence and logistical support, such as aerial refueling and search-and-rescue for downed coalition pilots, accelerated the sale of weapons to coalition states, and continued strikes against AQAP. American and British servicemen have provided advice and training related to Saudi-led airstrikes in Yemen.

The intervention has drawn criticism from international organizations and human rights groups, which stated that it contributed to civilian casualties, damage to infrastructure, and the humanitarian situation in Yemen. Academics also debate whether it violates Article 2(4) of the UN Charter. By 2019, the conflict was reported as a "military stalemate", and the following year, Saudi Arabia declared its first unilateral ceasefire. On 29 March 2022, the Saudi-led coalition announced that it would cease all hostilities within Yemen to facilitate political talks and peacekeeping efforts; Houthi and Saudi officials subsequently began bilateral peace talks mediated by Oman under UN auspices, and most restrictions on commercial goods were lifted by April 2023. In April 2024, open hostilities had largely ceased, though negotiations were ongoing due to complications caused by Houthi attacks on Red Sea shipping since October 2023. After Saudi Arabia resumed bombing Yemen amidst the 2026 Iran war, Houthis launched an offensive and succeeded in capturing territory along Yemen's western coast, potentially giving the group control over the geostrategically important Bab-el-Mandeb strait.

== Allegations of Iranian involvement ==
The coalition accused Iran of militarily and financially supporting the Houthis. On 9 April US secretary of state John Kerry said there were "obviously supplies that have been coming from Iran", with "a number of flights every single week that have been flying in", and warned Iran to stop its alleged support of the Houthis. Iran denied these claims.

Anti-Houthi fighters defending Aden claimed they captured two officers in the Iranian Quds Force on 11 April, who had purportedly been serving as military advisers to the Houthi militias in the city. This claim was not repeated. Iran denied presence of any Iranian military force.

According to Michael Horton, an expert on Yemeni affairs, the notion that the Houthis are an Iranian proxy is "nonsense".

According to Agence France-Presse, a confidential report presented to the Security Council's Iran sanctions committee in April 2015 claimed that Iran had been shipping weapons to the Houthi rebels since between 2009 and 2013. The panel further noted the absence of reports of any weapon shipments since 2013.

On 2 May, Abdollahian said that Tehran would not let regional powers jeopardize its security interests.

According to American officials, Iran discouraged Houthi rebels from taking over the Yemeni capital in late 2014, casting further doubt on claims that the rebels were fighting a proxy war on behalf of Iran. A spokeswoman for the US National Security Council said that it remained the council's assessment that "Iran does not exert command and control over the Houthis in Yemen."

On 6 May, Iran's supreme leader, Ayatollah Ali Khamenei, said, "The Americans shamelessly support the killing of the Yemeni population, but they accuse Iran of interfering in that country and of sending weapons when Iran only seeks to provide medical and food aid."

On 26 September 2015, Saudi Arabia alleged that an Iranian fishing boat loaded with weapons, including rockets and anti-tank shells, was intercepted and seized in the Arabian Sea, 240 km (150 mi) southeast of the Omani Port of Salalah, by Arab coalition forces. In May 2019, Houthi militias launched two attacks to two pumping stations managed by Saudi Aramco. Anas AlHajji, an oil expert, said that such an attack is planned to damage the said pipelines as they replace the Strait of Hormuz's oil passages.

== United States ==
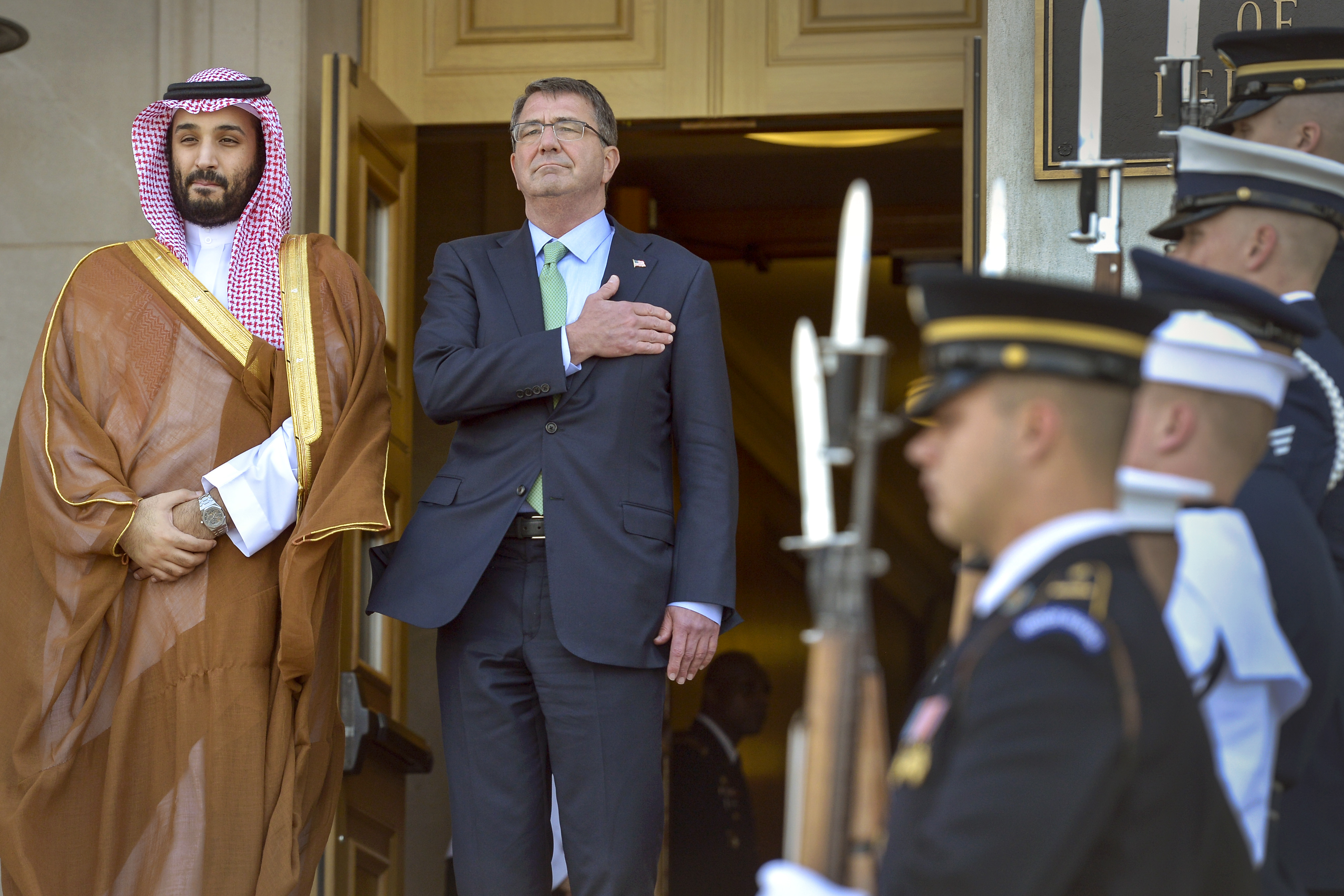
US Secretary of Defense Ashton Carter with Saudi Defense Minister Mohammad bin Salman Al Saud, Pentagon, 13 May 2015

In March 2015, President Barack Obama declared that he had authorized US forces to provide logistical and intelligence support to the Saudis in their military intervention in Yemen authorized by the Yemeni government, establishing a "Joint Planning Cell" with Saudi Arabia. This includes aerial refueling permitting coalition aircraft more loitering time over Yemen, and permitting some coalition members to home base aircraft rather than relocate them to Saudi Arabia.

According to press reporting, many in US SOCOM reportedly favor Houthis, as they have been effective at combating al-Qaeda and recently ISIL, "something that hundreds of US drone strikes and large numbers of advisers to Yemen's military had failed to accomplish". According to a senior CENTCOM commander, "the reason the Saudis didn't inform us of their plans is that they knew we would have told them exactly what we think—that it was a bad idea." As Yemen expert Michael Horton puts it, the US had been "Iran's air force in Iraq", and "al-Qaeda's air force in Yemen". According to an Al Jazeera report, one reason for US support may be the diplomatic logic of tamping down SA's opposition to the Iranian nuclear deal by backing them. Another is the view among some US military commanders that countering Iran took strategic priority over combating Al-Qaeda and ISIL.

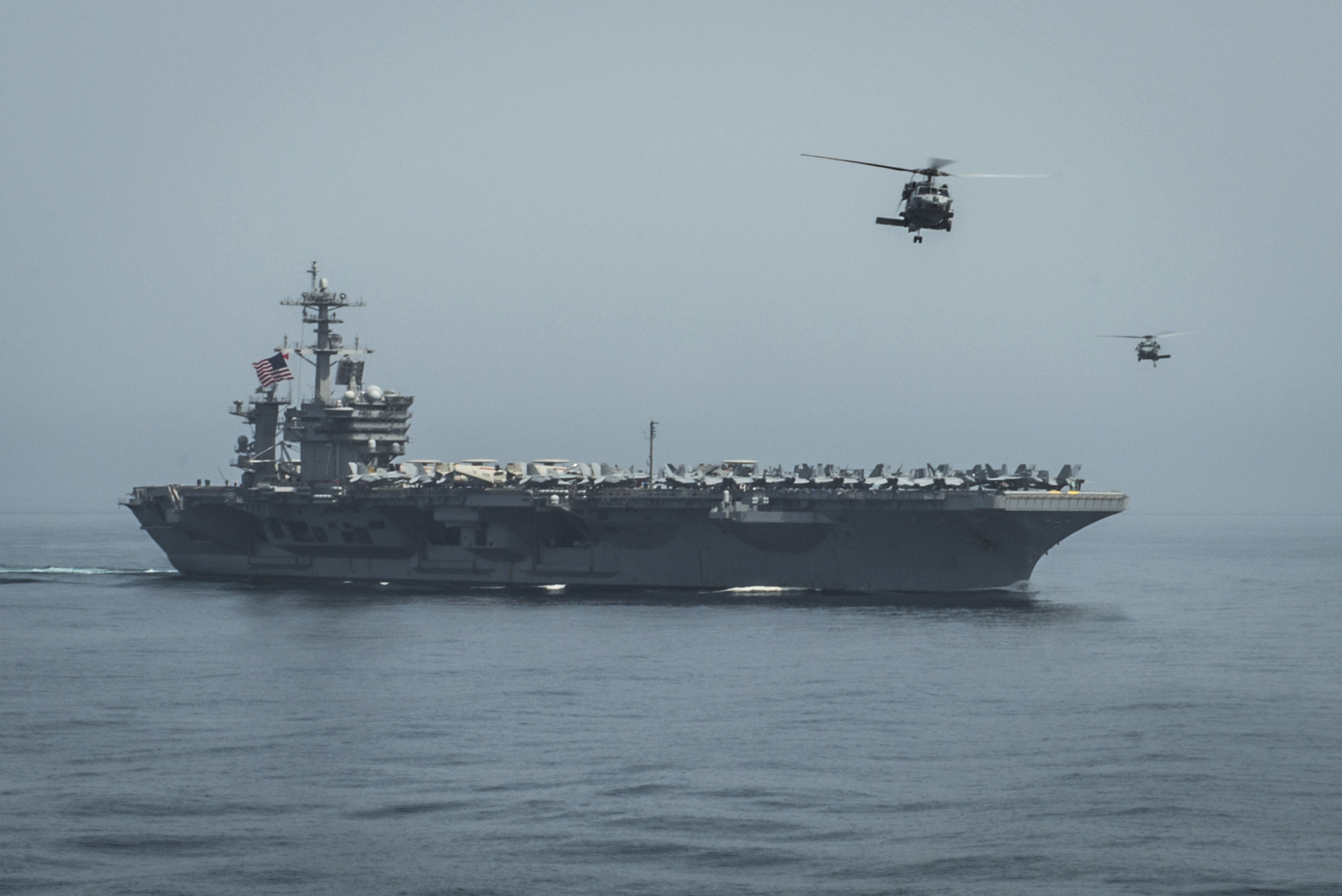
The US Navy has actively participated in the Saudi-led naval blockade, which humanitarian organizations argue has been the main contributing factor to the outbreak of famine in Yemen.

On 30 June, an HRW report stated that US-made bombs were being used in attacks indiscriminately targeting civilians and violating the laws of war. The report photographed "the remnants of an MK-83 air-dropped 1,000-pound bomb made in the US".

US Representative Ted Lieu has been publicly raising concerns over US support for Saudi-led war in Yemen. In March 2016, he sent a letter to Secretary of State John Kerry and Secretary of Defense Ash Carter. He wrote in the letter that the "apparent indiscriminate airstrikes on civilian targets in Yemen seem to suggest that either the coalition is grossly negligent in its targeting or is intentionally targeting innocent civilians". Following American concern about civilian casualties in the Saudi-led war in Yemen, the US military involvement is mostly ineffective due to coalition's airstrikes targeting civilians and hospitals.

In 2015, the United States deployed The Green Berets to assist the Saudi Arabian military with missile interception.

President Barack Obama, CIA Director John Brennan, King Salman and Prince Mohammad at the GCC-US Summit in Riyadh on 21 April 2016

A March 2016 Human Rights Watch report states that US participation in specific military operations, such as selecting targets and aerial refueling during Saudi air raids "may make US forces jointly responsible for laws-of-war violations by coalition forces". In September The Guardian reported that one in three bombing raids hit civilian sites.

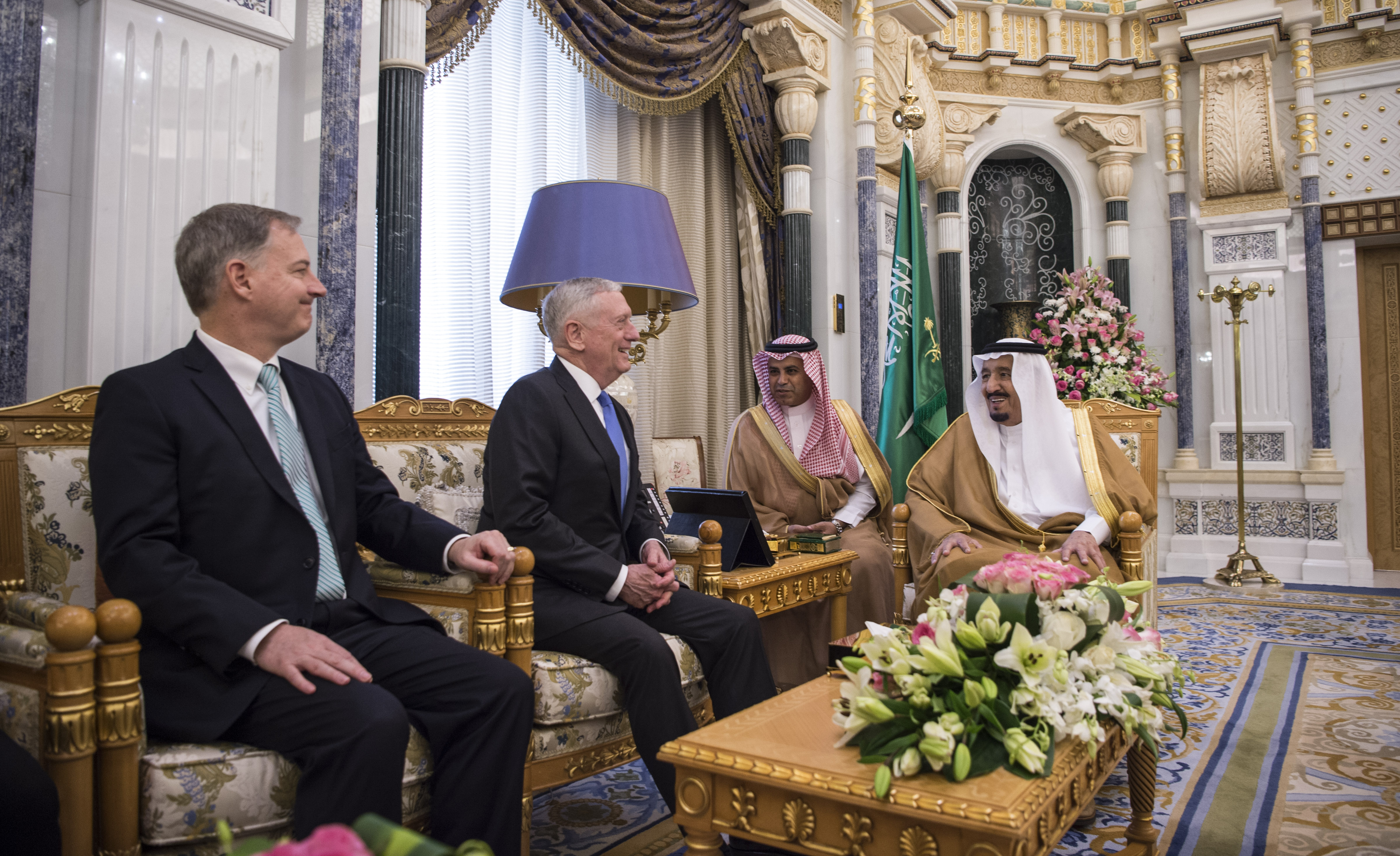
US Secretary of Defense James Mattis with King Salman of Saudi Arabia, Riyadh, 19 April 2017

On 13 October 2016, USS Nitze fired Tomahawk missiles at Houthi-controlled radar sites "in the Dhubab district of Taiz province, a remote area overlooking the Bab al-Mandab Straight known for fishing and smuggling."

In 2017, the United States sent a total of $599,099,937 of foreign aid to Yemen despite being a supporter of the Saudi led military intervention.

US Secretary of Defense James Mattis asked President Donald Trump to remove restrictions on US military support for Saudi Arabia. In February 2017, Mattis wanted to intercept and board an Iranian ship in the Arabian Sea to look for contraband weapons, which would have constituted an "act of war". In April 2017, Justin Amash, Walter Jones and other members of Congress criticized US involvement in Saudi Arabian military campaign in Yemen, highlighting that Al Qaeda in Yemen "has emerged as a de facto ally of the Saudi-led militaries with whom [Trump] administration aims to partner more closely".

In November 2017, US Senator Chris Murphy accused the United States of complicity in Yemen's humanitarian catastrophe.

In December 2017, the Trump administration urged restraint in the Saudi military action in Yemen, as well as in Qatar and Lebanon.

US bombs used by the coalition have killed Yemeni civilians throughout 2018, including a Lockheed Martin made bomb that struck a school bus in August, killing 51 people.

In the wake of Jamal Khashoggi's murder in October 2018, the US Secretary of State Mike Pompeo and the US Secretary of Defense James Mattis have called for a ceasefire in Yemen within 30 days followed by UN-initiated peace talks. Pompeo has asked Saudi Arabia and the UAE to stop their airstrikes on populated areas in Yemen. President of the International Rescue Committee David Miliband called the US announcement as "the most significant breakthrough in the war in Yemen for four years". The US continues its support of the Saudi-led intervention with weapons sales and intelligence sharing. On 10 November 2018, the US announced it would no longer refuel coalition aircraft operating over Yemen. On 13 December, the US Senate voted 56-to-41 to invoke the War Powers Resolution and end US military assistance to Saudi Arabia over alleged war crimes in Yemen, but the bill was not brought up in the US House.

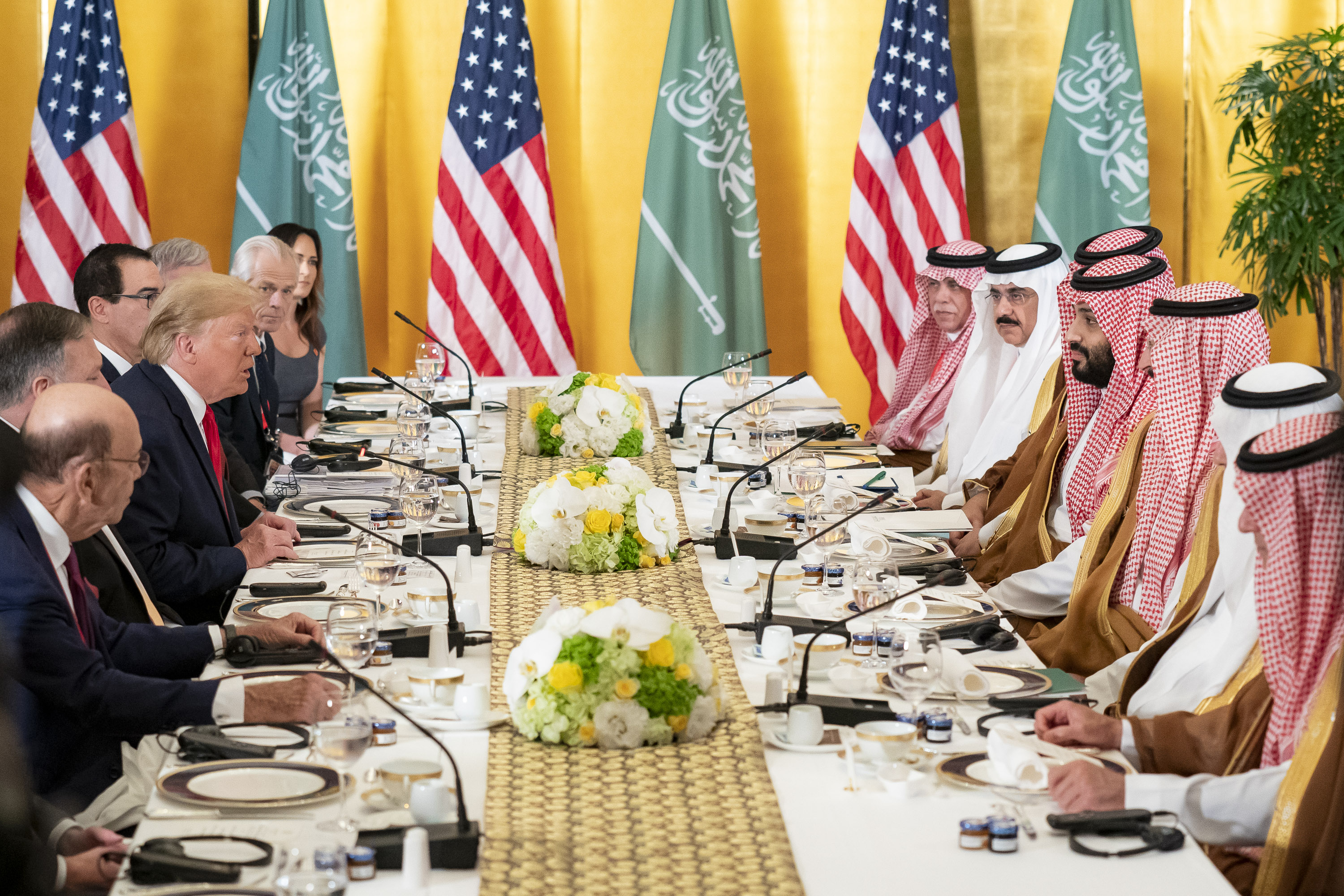
President Donald Trump with Saudi Crown Prince Mohammad bin Salman, 28 June 2019

Following the US Senate vote, the Pentagon presented a bill of $331 million to Saudis and Emiratis for US' support in the Yemen Civil War. The bill was split between $36.8 million for fuel and $294.3 million for US flight hours. The Pentagon stated that Saudi Arabia has not made any payments since the beginning of the war.

In April 2019, Trump vetoed a bipartisan bill which would have ended US support for the Saudi-led military intervention. With 53 votes instead of the 67 needed, the United States Senate failed to override the veto. The legal arguments and policies of the Obama administration were cited as justification for the veto. The US Deputy Assistant Secretary of Defense Michael Mulroy stated that US support was limited to side-by-side coaching to mitigate civilian casualties and if the measure had passed it would do nothing to help the people of Yemen and may only increase civilian deaths. Mulroy supported the United Nations' peace talks and he pushed the international community to come together and chart a comprehensive way ahead for Yemen. Writing in The Nation, Mohamad Bazzi argued that Mulroy's defence of US support as necessary to limit civilian casualties was false, and that "Saudi leaders and their allies have ignored American entreaties to minimize civilian casualties since the war's early days".

In the August 2020 report issued by the Office of Inspector General, it is said that the State Department watchdog detected that Secretary of State Mike Pompeo declared an emergency for selling arms worth billions of dollars to Saudi Arabia, the United Arab Emirates and Jordan, in compliance with legal requirements. However, the risks posed to civilian lives Yemen, with relation to the arms sale, wasn't thoroughly assessed at the time of declaring the emergency, the report states. The report also cited that the State Department's frequent approval of arms sale to the Gulf states, Saudi and UAE, fell below the limits of AECA.

On February 4, 2021, the new US President Joe Biden announced an end to the U.S. support for Saudi-led operations in Yemen but has backtracked on that goal and is considering returning to the Trump administration's designation of the Houthi rebels in Yemen as foreign terrorists.

As per the report published by Government Accountability Office (GAO) in June 2022, neither the Pentagon nor the State Department could show if they had properly investigated allegations that Saudi-led coalition used U.S.-provided military support to carry out airstrikes and other attacks that allegedly killed civilians in Yemen. Nearly $55 billion in weapons the U.S. has sold to Saudi Arabia and the United Arab Emirates between 2015 and 2021 had been improperly used to harm civilians in Yemen. The report also raised serious doubts about Joe Biden's foreign policy ending US support for Saudi offensive operations in Yemen because the administration's move to classify weapons as offensive or defensive was largely meaningless.

Analysis by Oxfam of data from January 2021 to February 2022 found that 431 airstrikes using U.S. or UK provided weapons resulted in at least 87 civilians killed and 136 wounded. Osfam stated 13 airstrikes had hit hospitals and clinics.

== United Kingdom ==
UK military export licences for Saudi Arabia [GBP millions] Source: UK Department for Business, Innovation and Skills
340	1,735	109	1,602	80	2,836
2010	2011	2012	2013	2014	2015*; *Q1-Q3 only

The UK is one of the largest suppliers of arms to Saudi Arabia, and London immediately expressed strong support for the Saudi-led campaign. Six months into the bombing, Oxfam said the UK government was "quietly fuelling the Yemen conflict and exacerbating one of the world's worst humanitarian crises" by continuing to allow arms exports to Saudi Arabia; the Campaign Against Arms Trade (CAAT) claimed that "UK arms and UK cooperation have been central to the devastation of Yemen." In mid-September 2015, the deputy chief executive of Oxfam complained about the UK government's refusal to reveal to Parliament the details of the 37 arms export licences it had granted for sales to Saudi Arabia since March that year. The Saudi campaign in Yemen saw sales of UK-made munitions for 2015 increase from £9m to over £1bn in three months. Amnesty International and Human Rights Watch have claimed that UK-made arms are being used on civilian targets. Furthermore, the UK government has been repeatedly accused of violating domestic, EU, and international law, in particular the Arms Trade Treaty, by allowing arms sales to Saudi Arabia.

Despite this, it was reported in November 2015 that the UK planned a number of high-level visits to Saudi Arabia over the following three to six months with the aim of securing major arms deals.

In January 2016, it was rerported that UK military advisors were assisting Saudi personnel in the selection of targets. On 2 February 2016, the International Development Select Committee finally added its call for the UK to cease exporting arms to Saudi Arabia and to end its opposition to an independent international inquiry into the way the military campaign had been conducted thus far. The committee's call went unheeded; just weeks later, on the day the EU held a non-binding vote in favour of an arms embargo on the country because of its bombing of Yemen, Prime Minister David Cameron praised his government's role in mediating the sale of "brilliant" arms, components, and other military technology from BAE Systems to Saudi Arabia, Oman and other Gulf states.

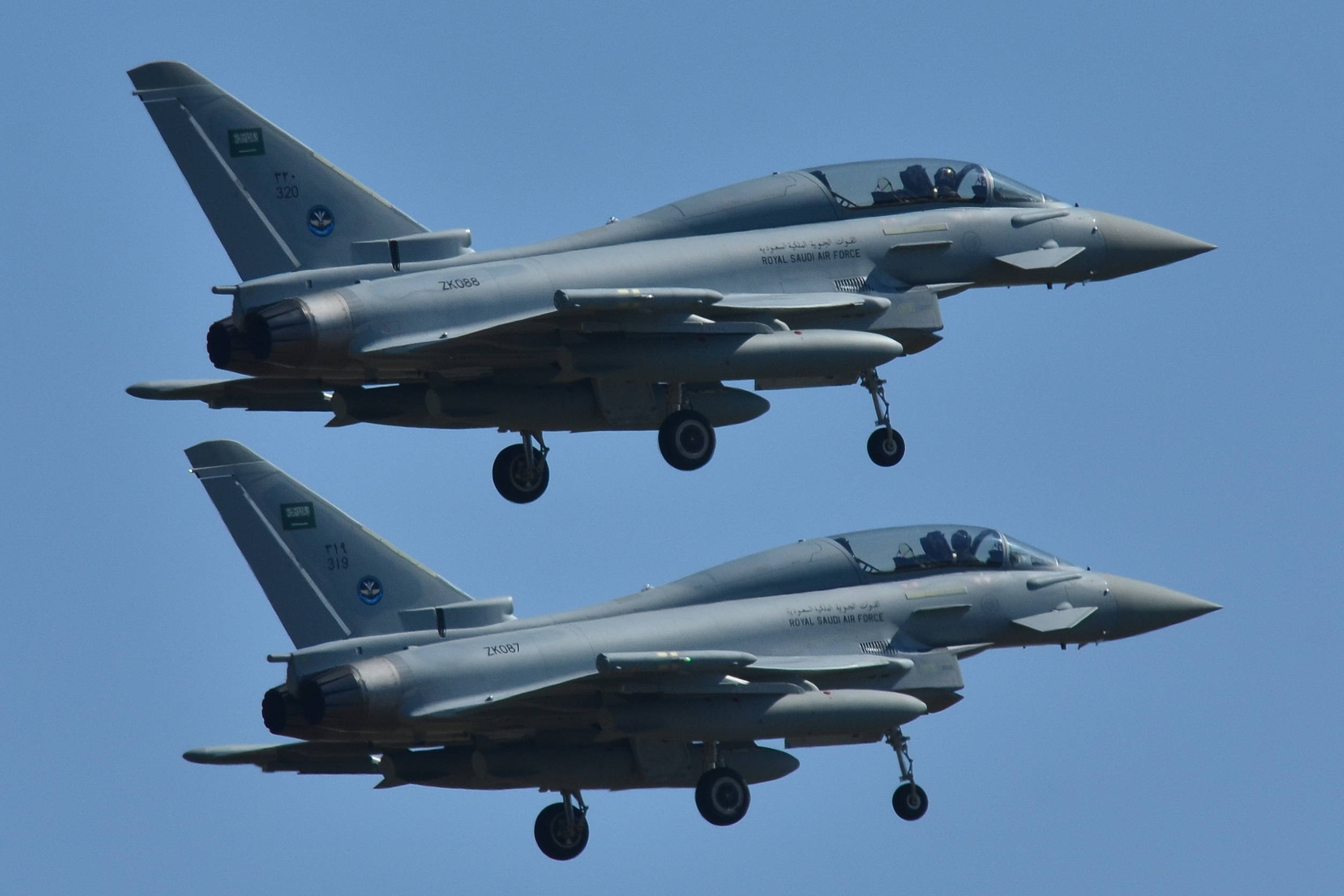
Saudi Arabia's UK-supplied Eurofighter Typhoons are playing a central role in Saudi-led bombing campaign in Yemen.

Angus Robertson, the SNP's Parliamentary Group Leader, said David Cameron should admit to British involvement in Saudi Arabia's war in Yemen: "Isn't it time for the Prime Minister to admit that Britain is effectively taking part in a war in Yemen that is costing thousands of civilians lives and he has not sought parliamentary approval to do this?" A few months later, leading American security expert Bruce Riedel noted: "If the United States and the United Kingdom, tonight, told King Salman [of Saudi Arabia] 'this war has to end,' it would end tomorrow. The Royal Saudi Air Force cannot operate without American and British support."

In January 2016, Tobias Ellwood, the Minister for the Middle East, claimed in the House of Commons that evidence of attacks on Yemeni civilians by Saudi Arabian forces may have been fabricated by the "media savvy" Houthis. Ellwood made the claim as he answered questions about a leaked UN report which suggested that Saudi-led Coalition forces have specifically targeted civilians during their campaign in Yemen. Ellwood stated he took the report's allegations "very seriously", but noted its authors had never personally visited Yemen in person and suggested that the evidence of possible Coalition attacks on civilians was based largely on "hearsay" and satellite photographs.

Theresa May succeeded David Cameron as prime minister in July 2016, but maintained her predecessor's policy because, she claimed, close ties with the Saudis "keep people on the streets of Britain safe". In September 2016, her foreign minister, Boris Johnson, refused to block UK arms sales to Saudi Arabia, saying there remained no clear evidence of breaches of international humanitarian law by Saudi Arabia in the war in Yemen, and that it would be best for Saudi Arabia to investigate itself. Amid reports from Yemen of famine conditions and "emaciated children [...] fighting for their lives", CAAT observed that the notion of self-investigation would rightly never pass muster if it were proposed for Russia's bombing in support of Assad in Syria. Indeed, in October 2016, Boris Johnson commended the notion of referring allegations of Russian and Russian-backed war crimes to the International Court of Justice. The previous month, Johnson had rejected a proposal for the UN Human Rights Council to conduct an inquiry into the war in Yemen. The UK government was accused by human rights groups of blocking such an inquiry from taking place. Foreign Office lawyer and whistleblower Molly Mulready claimed that Johnson was uninterested and "joked around" when briefed about Coalition war crimes allegedly committed using UK-made weapons. In October 2016, it was reported that the United Kingdom was providing instruction to pilots of the Royal Saudi Air Force, both in the UK and in Saudi Arabia.

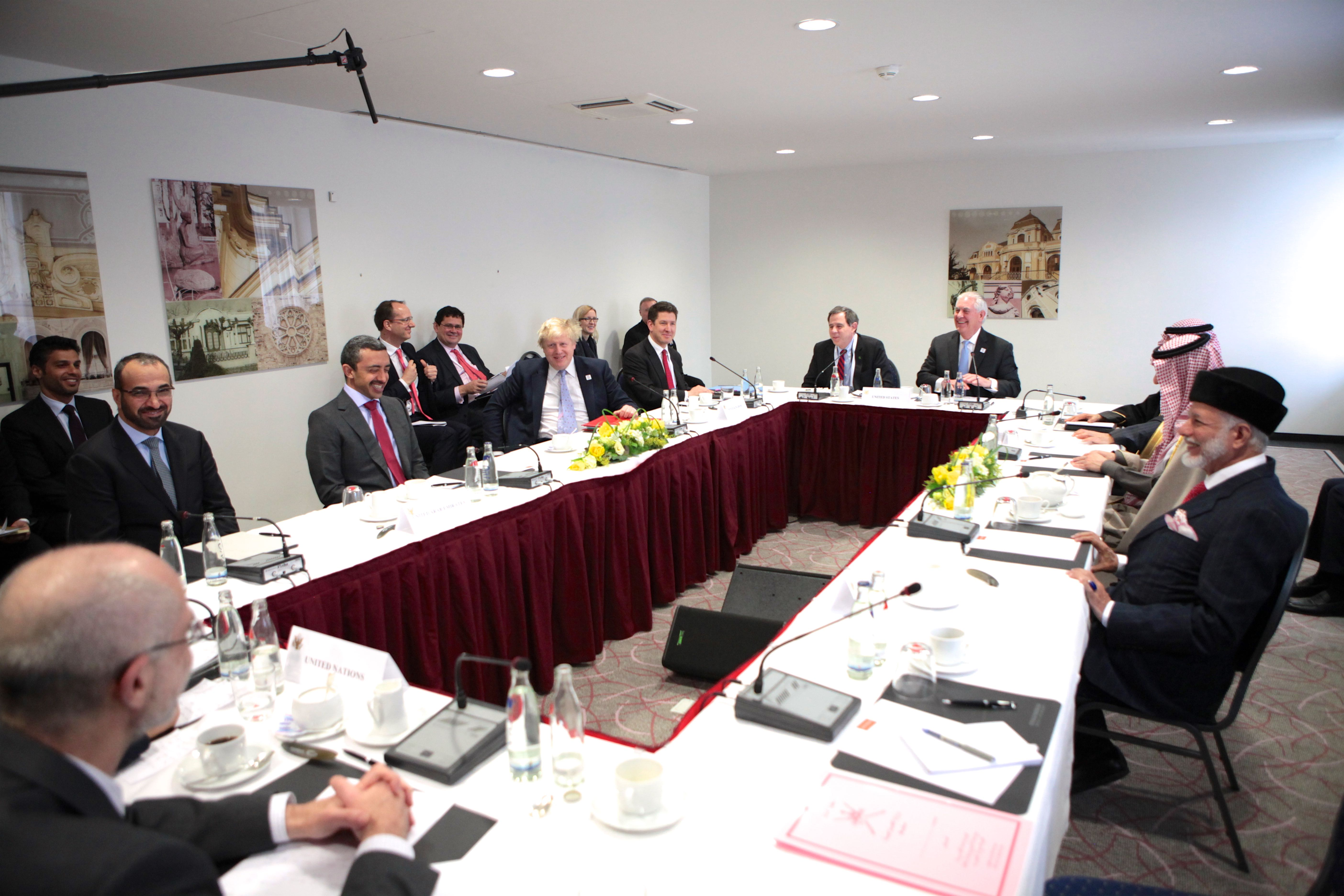
UK Foreign Secretary Boris Johnson participates in a meeting on Yemen with counterparts from the United States, Saudi Arabia, United Arab Emirates and Oman, on 16 February 2017

In 2015, Andrew Mitchell, a former cabinet minister in the Cameron ministry, stated urged the new Foreign Secretary Jeremy Hunt "to review the position of the British Government at the United Nations in respect of the Yemen? Will he move from a position of supporting the Saudi coalition, where Britain is complicit in creating a famine, to one of constructive neutrality to secure a ceasefire and meaningful constitutional negotiations, as the UN special representative Martin Griffiths is consistently urging and trying to secure?"

British military personnel have allegedly been involved in gunfights with Houthi fighters during the conflict, during which least five Special Boat Service (SBS) soldiers were purportedly wounded. An SBS source has been quoted as saying "The guys are fighting in the inhospitable desert and mountainous terrain against highly committed and well-equipped Houthi rebels, The SBS's role is mainly training and mentoring but on occasions, they have found themselves in firefights and some British troops have been shot". News of the allegations led to concern in Britain, and Labour politicians demanded answers from their Conservative counterparts in the House of Commons. Shadow Foreign Secretary Emily Thornberry questioned these allegations in Parliament suggesting that the British forces may have been witnesses to war crimes if the allegations were true. She claimed that as many as 40% of the soldiers in the Saudi-led coalition were children in a breach of international humanitarian law. In response, Foreign Office minister Mark Field called the allegations "very serious and well sourced" and promised to get to the bottom of them.

On 25 March 2019, Conservative politicican Mark Lancaster told the UK parliament that Royal Air Force personnel were providing "engineering support" and "generic training" to Saudi Arabian military.

According to the Guardian News agency, more than 40 Saudi officers have been trained at British military colleges since the Saudi intervention in Yemen started. This officers mostly trained at Sandhurst, the RAF's school at Cranwell and the Royal Naval College in Dartmouth since 2015. The MoD refused to state the earned money from the Saudi contracts, because it could influence Britain's relations with the Saudis.

In April 2020, Campaign Against the Arms Trade (CAAT) analyzed the annual report of BAE Systems and stated that the firm had sold weapons worth £15bn to Saudi Arabia. CAAT also stated that supply of weapons continued during Riyadh's involvement in Yemen civil war, while BAE generated £2.5bn in revenues from the Saudi military in 2019.

The Houthi leader Abdul-Malik Badreddin al-Houthi has condemned the UK's military cooperation with and arms sales to the Saudis. According to a Sky News analysis, the UK has sold at least £5.7bn worth of arms to the Saudi-led coalition fighting in Yemen since 2015.

Priyanka Motaparthy, senior emergencies researcher at Human Rights Watch, said: "These revelations confirm once again how the UK military is working hand in glove with the Saudis."

On August 24, 2020, a British soldier, Ahmed Al-Babati was arrested for protesting outside the Ministry of Defence (MOD) in London, against arms sales to Saudi Arabia that were being used in the Yemen war. He accused the UK government of having 'blood on their hands'.

On 27 October 2020, the Campaign Against Arms Trade (CAAT) decided to launch a judicial review into the UK's decision to renew selling arms to Saudi Arabia, which has been involved in the Yemen war. According to CAAT, the weapons sales to the Kingdom would further fuel destruction in Yemen, where thousands of civilians were asserted to have died because of the widespread bombing.

In January 2021, the UK government was reportedly put under pressure for not maintaining the record of a series of air strikes that took place in Yemen, involving civilian casualties, in the Ministry of Defence's confidential log of reported breaches of the IHL or International Humanitarian Law by the warring parties. The database, which had been maintained by the MoD since 2015, came under limelight after the UK arms manufacturers were involved in a legal challenge over export licenses provided to Saudi for sale of weapons used in Yemen. Saudi Arabia leads an Arab coalition that has been accused of causing the most number of human rights violations in the conflict. Reportedly, the weapons were claimed to be used in the breach of IHL. As per the questions raised in October 2020 by Emily Thornberry, a range of such airstrikes were identified as well as reported by the non-profit organization Yemen Data Project and not in the MoD database.

The anti-arms trade campaigners, CAAT reportedly won to challenge the UK government in the high court for its decision to resume arms sales to the Kingdom of Saudi Arabia, which is possibly used in the Yemen war. A complete hearing will be conducted in the coming months of 2021, which will renew the legal battle between the British government and the campaigning group. A similar battle previously led to halting the sales of arms to the Saudi government.

On 20 October 2021, a London based law firm, Guernica 37 filed a complaint to British police accusing senior government and military officials in Saudi Arabia and the UAE of conspiring in war crimes in Yemen. The dossier was submitted to London's Metropolitan Police Service and the Crown Prosecution Service (CPS), calling for the individuals to be immediately arrested as soon as they enter the UK. Guernica 37's legal team focused on three events, including a 2018 air attack on a school bus in northern Yemen that killed around 26 children, and a 2016 aerial bombing of a funeral in Sana'a that killed 140 people.

== France ==
France is also a significant arms supplier to Saudi Arabia. It has supplied over 2 billion dollars including armored vehicles, air defense systems, and aircraft subsystems. France has also supplied the UAE with arms, despite the UAE and the militias it backs being implicated in war crimes and other serious violations. In late September 2021, two NGOs filed a legal case in the Paris administrative court ordering the French customs to disclose their records in order to investigate the war equipments exported to countries like the United Arab Emirates and Saudi Arabia, having involvement in the Yemen war. The case was filed after the French customs denied disclosing the required documentation in the probe of potential links to the sale of weaponry in Yemen war, as per ECCHR and Amnesty International France. Investigative media firm namely, Disclose was also one of the plaintiffs in the case.

== Private military involvement ==
On 22 November 2015, The New York Times reported the United Arab Emirates had contracted Academi to deploy 450 Colombian, Panamanian, Salvadoran and Chilean mercenaries to Yemen in October.

On 9 December, Australian media reported an Australian mercenary commander was killed in Yemen alongside six Colombian nationals after Houthi fighters and Saleh army units attacked Saudi-led forces in the country's south-west.

== Others ==
According to a 2018 Reuters report, a confidential UN report found that North Korea was attempting to sell weapons to the Houthis.

On 17 September 2020, a United Nations panel named Canada as one of the countries helping fuel the war in Yemen. A coalition of 39 human rights, arms-control and labor groups, including the Public Service Alliance of Canada, signed a letter urging Canadian Prime Minister Justin Trudeau to end arms exports to Saudi Arabia.

The Italian government announced suspending the sales of 12,700 missiles to the Saudi Arabian government along with UAE, which was initiated under the centre-left government led by Matteo Renzi. The missiles were part of a 2016 sales agreement made for the allotment of a total of 20,000 missiles, worth more than $485 million. The government cited its commitment towards the restoration of peace in Yemen and the protection of human rights as the reason for ending the weapons sale. Renzi stirred a controversy when he attended the Future Investment Initiative in Riyadh, Saudi Arabia, and called the country the vision of a "New Renaissance".

== See also ==
- Outline of the Yemeni crisis, revolution, and civil war (2011–present)
- Timeline of the Yemeni crisis (2011–present)
- Famine in Yemen
- Airstrikes on hospitals in Yemen
- Saudi Arabian-led intervention in Yemen
- United Arab Emirates takeover of Socotra
- Iran–Saudi Arabia proxy conflict
