= Project Babylon =

Iraqi project to build superguns

Coordinates: 34.5000°N 44.5000°E

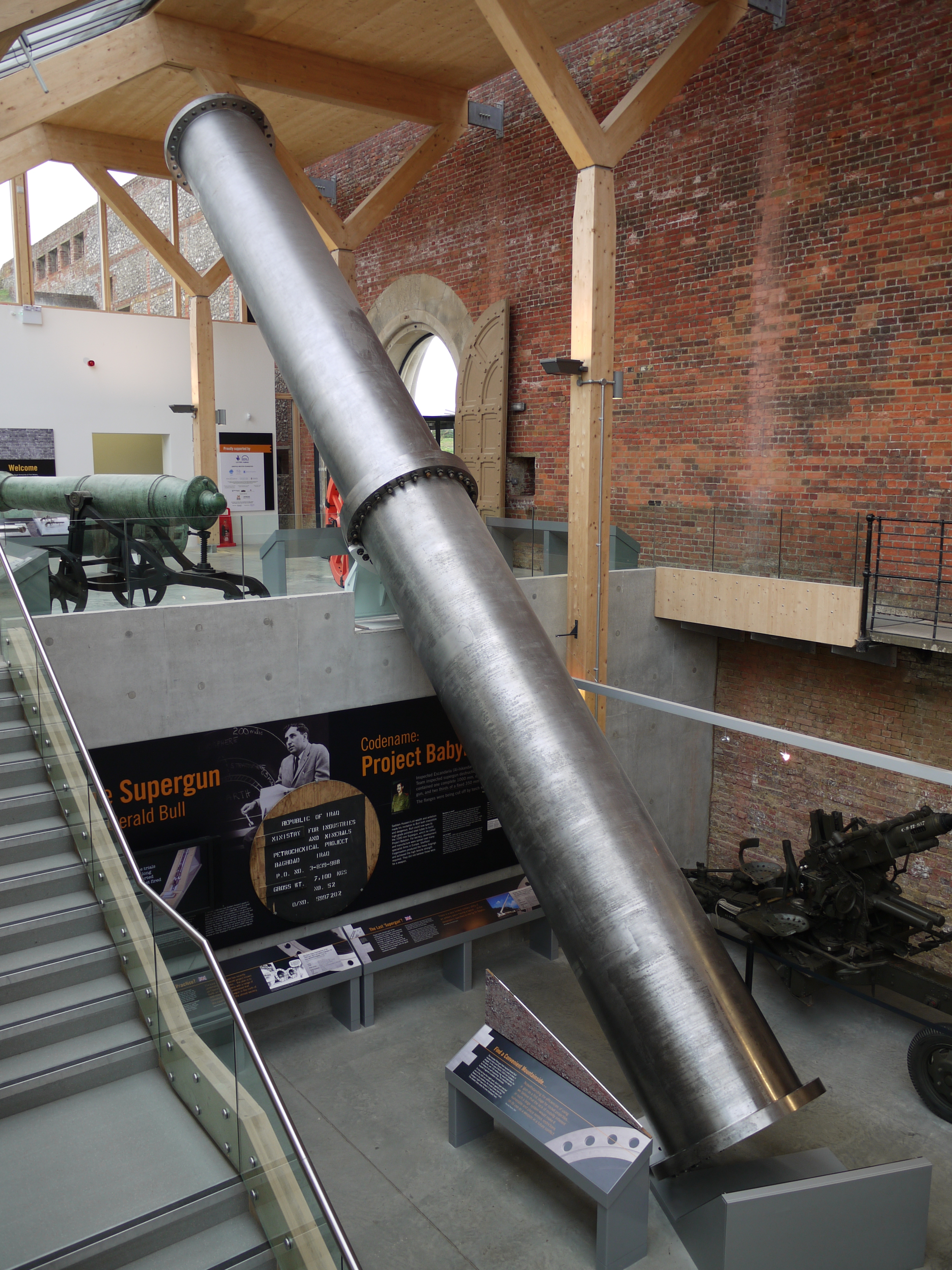
Two sections of Big Babylon that have been bolted together at Royal Armouries, Fort Nelson, Portsmouth.

Project Babylon was a space gun project commissioned by then Iraqi president Saddam Hussein. It involved building a series of "superguns". The design was based on research from the 1960s Project HARP led by the Canadian artillery expert Gerald Bull. There were most likely four different devices in the program.

The project began in 1988; it was halted in 1990 after Bull was assassinated, allegedly by Israel, and part of the superguns were seized in transit around Europe. The components that remained in Iraq were destroyed by the United Nations following the 1991 Gulf War.

== Devices ==
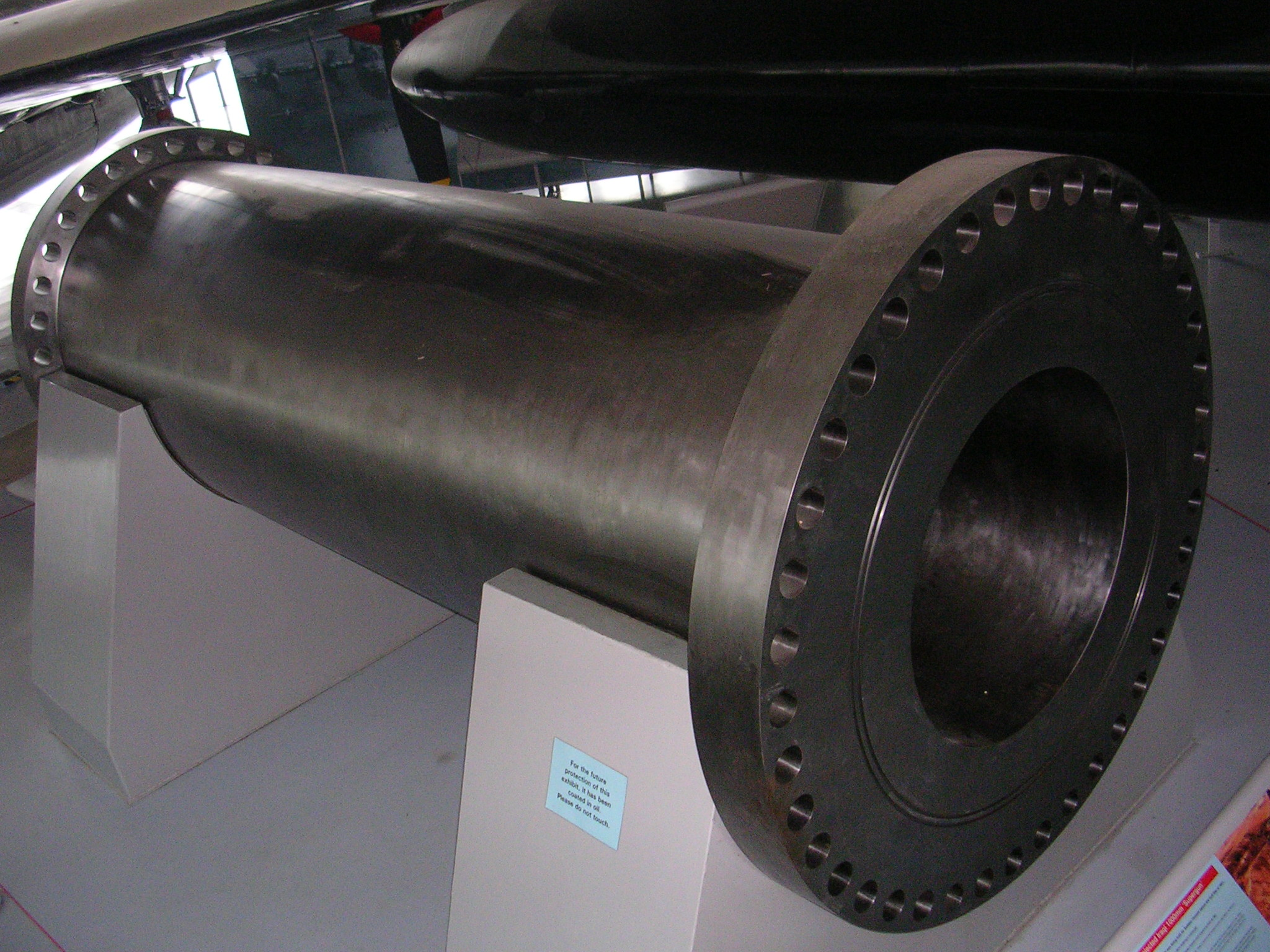
A section of the Iraqi "supergun" from Imperial War Museum Duxford

=== Baby Babylon ===
The first of these superguns, "Baby Babylon", was a horizontally mounted device which was a prototype for test purposes. It had a bore of 350 mm (13.8 inches), and a barrel length of 46 metres (151 feet), and weighed some 102 tonnes. After conducting tests with lead projectiles, this gun was set up on a hillside at a 45-degree angle. It was expected to achieve a range of 750 km. Although its mass was similar to some World War II German "large-calibre guns", it was not designed to be a mobile weapon and was not considered a security risk by Israel.

=== Big Babylon ===
The second supergun, "Big Babylon", of which a pair were planned (one to be mounted horizontally, at least for test purposes), was much larger. The barrel was to be 156 metres (512 feet) long, with a bore of 1 metre (3.3 feet). Originally intended to be suspended by cables from a steel framework, it would have been over 100 metres (300 feet) high at the tip. The complete device weighed about 2,100 tonnes (the barrel alone weighed 1,655 tons). It was a space gun intended to shoot projectiles into orbit, a theme of Bull's work since Project HARP. Neither of these devices could be elevated or trained, making them useless for direct military purposes, unless some form of terminal guidance could be used to direct the fired projectile onto its intended target.

It is possible that Big Babylon was intended both to launch satellites and to serve as a weapon, but its ability to fire conventional projectiles in the latter role would have been very limited: in addition to the impossibility of aiming it, it would have had a slow rate of fire, and its firing would have produced a very pronounced "signature" which would have revealed its location. Since it was immobile, it suffered from the same vulnerability as Germany's V-3 cannon, which the RAF readily destroyed in 1944. Also, Iraq already had Scud missiles which were far more effective than the outdated supergun technology.

=== Future plans ===
Very large cannons, which would be capable of being elevated and trained, were also planned. The first was to have a bore of 350 mm (13.8 inches) and a barrel length of about 30 metres (100 feet), and it was expected to have a range of up to 1000 kilometres (about 625 miles), making Israel and central Iran well within reach of Iraqi artillery fire.

== Outcome ==
The metal tubes for the barrels and gun cradles were purchased from firms in the United Kingdom, including Sheffield Forgemasters of South Yorkshire, and Walter Somers of Halesowen. Other components, such as breeches and recoil mechanisms, were ordered from firms in Germany, France, Spain, Switzerland, and Italy. Baby Babylon was completed, and test shots were fired from it, revealing problems with the seals between the barrel segments. As those were being worked on, Bull was assassinated in March 1990, possibly by Mossad, halting the project.

Most of the barrel sections for Big Babylon were delivered to, and assembled on, a site excavated on a hillside, instead of being suspended by cables from a steel framework as originally planned. Calculations had shown that the original support framework would be insufficiently rigid. It was never completed.

In early April 1990, United Kingdom customs officers confiscated several pieces of the second Big Babylon barrel, which were disguised as "petrochemical pressure vessels". The parts were confiscated at Teesport Docks. More pieces were seized in Greece and Turkey in transit by truck to Iraq. Other components, such as slide bearings for Big Babylon, were seized at their manufacturers' sites in Spain and Switzerland.

After the Gulf War in 1991, the Iraqis admitted the existence of Project Babylon, and allowed UN inspectors to destroy the hardware in Iraq as part of the disarmament process.

Several barrel sections seized by UK customs officers are displayed at the Royal Armouries museum in Fort Nelson, near Portsmouth. Another section was on display at The Royal Artillery Museum, Woolwich, London, until 2016. One of the 26 sections is now displayed at the Imperial War Museum Duxford in the American Air Museum Hangar.

== In media ==
The events of Project Babylon are dramatized in the 1994 HBO movie Doomsday Gun starring Frank Langella as Bull, with Kevin Spacey, Alan Arkin, and Clive Owen in supporting roles, and in Frederick Forsyth's novel The Fist of God.

The novel Splinter Cell, written by Raymond Benson under the pseudonym David Michaels, refers to Project Babylon and Gerald Bull as the antagonists in the story who develop and manage to fire a new supergun, "Babylon Phoenix".

The novel Nature of the Beast by Louise Penny revolves around the story of Gerald Bull and Project Babylon.

The Babylon Project provided the inspiration for the Golgo 13 manga story "The Gun at Am-Shara", in which the title character assassinates a fictional weapons designer who created a much larger variant of the Babylon gun.

In Conflict: Desert Storm II, the Babylon guns are the objective of the final mission, requiring the player to mark them for airstrikes; a scene highly reminiscent of the climax of The Fist of God.

The video game Mercenaries: Playground of Destruction reimagines the gun as the "Type 07 supergun".

== See also ==
- Al-Fao (Iraqi supergun)
- Iran–Iraq War
  - French support for Iraq during the Iran–Iraq war
- Schwerer Gustav
- Space Research Corporation
- From the Earth to the Moon
- The Fist of God (fictitious retelling of Project Babylon)
