= Supergun affair =

1990 UK political scandal

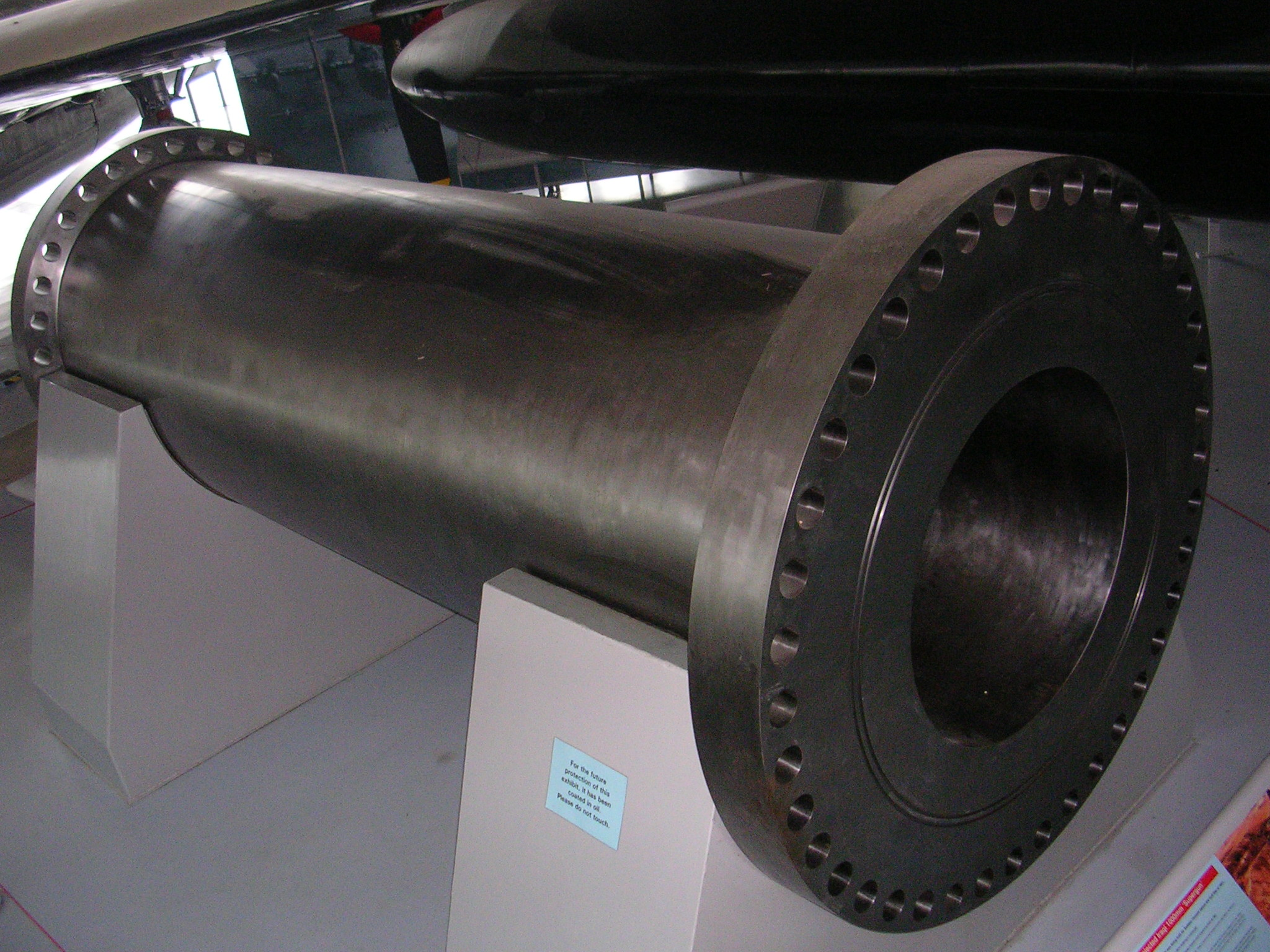
A section of the Iraqi supergun from Imperial War Museum Duxford

The Supergun affair was a 1990 political scandal in the United Kingdom that involved two businesses (Sheffield Forgemasters and Walter Somers Ltd), Gerald Bull, members of parliament Hal Miller and Nicholas Ridley, the UK's Secret Intelligence Service, a failed prosecution, and components of a "supergun" (as newspaper headlines had it) that the businesses were alleged to have been exporting to Iraq that they and others had contacted the government about in 1988. The collapse of the court case preceded the Arms-to-Iraq case, which involved a different company (Matrix Churchill), by four months.

Canadian engineer Gerald Bull became interested in the possibility of using "superguns" in place of rockets to insert payloads into orbit. He lobbied for the start of Project HARP to investigate this concept in the 1960s, using paired ex-US Navy 16"/50 caliber Mark 7 gun barrels welded end-to-end. Three of these 16"/100 (406 mm) guns were emplaced, one in Quebec, Canada, another in Barbados, and the third near Yuma, Arizona. HARP was later cancelled, and Bull turned to military designs, eventually developing the GC-45 howitzer. Some years later, Bull interested Saddam Hussein in funding Project Babylon. The objective of this project is not certain, but one possibility is that it was intended to develop a gun capable of firing an object into orbit, whence it could then drop onto any place on the Earth. Gerald Bull was assassinated in March 1990, terminating development, and the parts were confiscated by British customs after the Gulf War.
