= USS PGM-10 =

Gunboat of the United States Navy

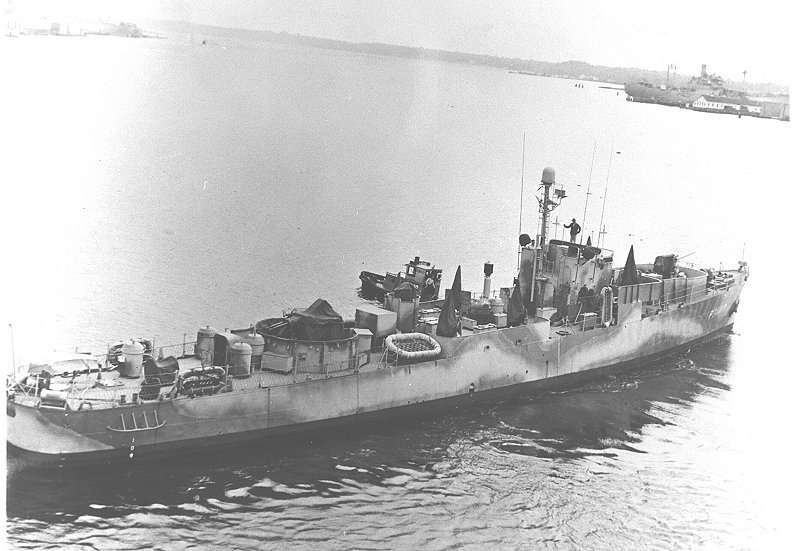
- Ship of same class, USS PGM-17

History

United States
- Name: PGM-10
- Builder: Commercial Iron Works
- Launched: 27 October 1943
- Commissioned: 29 November 1944
- Fate: Transferred to the Philippines

Philippines

General characteristics
- Displacement: 280 tons (light), 450 tons (full)
- Length: 173 ft 8 in (52.93 m)
- Beam: 23 ft (7.0 m)
- Draft: 10 ft 10 in (3.30 m)
- Propulsion: Two 1,280 bhp (950 kW) Hooven-Owen-Rentschler RB-99 DA diesel engines
- Speed: 19 knots (35 km/h; 22 mph)
- Complement: 65 officers and enlisted
- Armament: 1 x 3"/50 dual purpose gun; 1 x 40 mm gun; 6 × 20 mm guns; 4 x twin .50 cal (12.7 mm) machine guns

USS PGM-10 was a PGM-9-class motor gunboat that was in service with the United States Navy during World War II, and transferred to the Philippine Navy shortly thereafter.

== History ==
PGM-10 was laid down on 18 September 1943, as PC-805 by the Commercial Iron Works, in Portland, Oregon. After being launched on 27 October 1943, she was reclassified as PGM-10 in August 1944. On 29 November 1944, she was put into naval service as PGM-10.

On 5 January 1945, PGM-10 left San Pedro, California, for Pearl Harbor, Hawaii, and arrived outside Pearl Harbor 6 days later on 11 January 1945. Later, on 3 February 1945, she steamed for Eniwetok, escorting LSM's and LSI's. Along the journey, she passed within 15 miles of the Japanese-held Wotje Atoll, coming within sight of Kawajalin. She arrived at Eniwetok two days later on 14 February 1945, leaving once again two days later escorting 4 merchant ships and a navy tanker along with 2 other Patrol Craft as escorts.

PGM-10 would continue her duties in this fashion until 25 February 1945, when she began her first patrol duty. On 27 and 28 February 1945, she shelled a Japanese Radio Installation. By May 1945, she had four shot down Japanese planes to her credit.

=== Typhoon Louise ===
Like the ill-fated PGM-9, her sister, PGM-10, was also present for Typhoon Louise. A deck log is as follows:

"17 OCT 1945. ARRIVED OKINAWA. LARGE NUMBER OF OUR SHIPS ON REEF DUE TO TYPHOON. PGM 9 IS ON REEF. TIDAL WAVE WASHED AWAY ATOLL OF ENAWETOK."

=== Ship's fate ===
In October 1948, the ship was transferred to the State Department, Foreign Liquidation Commission. Little is known about the ships post-war life, only that she was transferred to the Philippine Navy after late 1948.
