= PC-461-class submarine chaser =

Class of submarine chasers, primarily for the US Navy

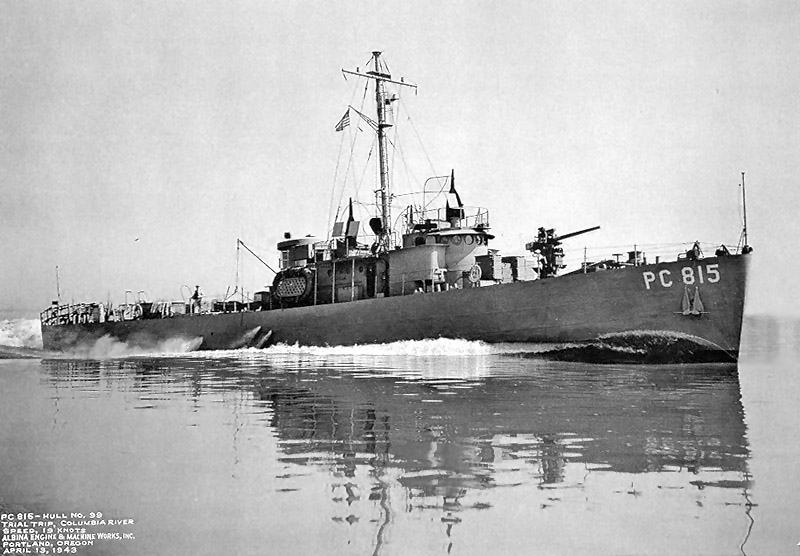
- PC-461-class submarine chaser USS PC-815 in April 1943

Class overview
- Builders: Albina Engine & Machine Works; Brown Shipbuilding Company; Commercial Iron Works; Consolidated Shipbuilding Corporation; Defoe Shipbuilding Company; Dravo Corporation; George Lawley & Son; Gibbs Gas Engine Company; Jeffersonville Boat and Machinery Company; Leathem D. Smith Shipbuilding Company; Luders Marine Construction Company; Nashville Bridge Company; Penn-Jersey Shipbuilding Company; Sullivan Drydock and Repair Corporation
- Operators: United States Navy; During World War II: Brazilian Navy; Free French Naval Forces; Hellenic Navy; Royal Norwegian Navy; Royal Netherlands Navy; National Navy of Uruguay; After World War II; Royal Cambodian Navy; Republic of China Navy; Republic of China Inspectorate of Customs; People's Liberation Army Navy; Cuban Coast Guard; Cuban Revolutionary Navy; Dominican Navy; French Navy; Indonesian Navy; Israeli Navy; Republic of Korea Navy; Royal Moroccan Navy; Nigerian Navy; Peruvian Navy; Philippine Navy; Portuguese Navy; Republic of Vietnam Navy; Spanish Navy; Royal Thai Navy; United States Air Force; Bolivarian Navy of Venezuela
- Preceded by: USS PC-451 and USS PC-452
- Succeeded by: PC-1610 class
- Cost: $1.6 million
- Built: 1940-1944
- In commission: 1941–2015; 1941–1968 US Navy; 1945–1990 Philippine Navy; 1947–1994 Royal Thai Navy; 1985–2015 Peruvian Navy
- Planned: 401
- Completed: 341
- Cancelled: 60
- Active: 0
- Lost: 27
- Preserved: 0

General characteristics
- Type: Submarine chaser
- Displacement: 450 tons
- Length: 173 ft 8 in (53 m)
- Beam: 23 ft 0 in (7 m)
- Draft: 6 ft 2.5 in (2 m)
- Propulsion: 2 × 1,440 bhp (1,070 kW) or 1,280 bhp (950 kW) diesel engines; 2 × shafts
- Speed: 20.2 knots (37.4 km/h; 23.2 mph)
- Range: 3000 nautical miles at 12 knots
- Complement: 65
- Armament: Varied over time. Typically one 3"/50 gun forward, one 3"/50 or 40 mm Bofors aft, three or five 20 mm single mount cannons bridge/amidships; two or four K-gun depth charge projectors, two depth charge rails.

The PC-461-class submarine chasers were a class of 341 submarine chasers constructed between 1941 and 1944 for the United States Navy (USN). The PC-461s were based primarily on two experimental submarine chasers, PC-451 and PC-452. While PC-461 began the series, the first of the class to enter service was PC-471. Fifty-nine PC-461s were converted to other types of patrol vessels.

As part of the Lend-Lease program, 41 ships of the class were transferred to allies of the United States. In addition to the USN, six allied navies operated PC-461s during World War II. Postwar, another hundred PC-461s were transferred from the USN to various navies. World events and further transfers from these navies – some ships of the class served in three different navies and one served in four – resulted in another eighteen navies (two of them of adversaries of the US – the Cuban Revolutionary Navy and China's People's Liberation Army Navy) operating PC-461s, with one heavily modified vessel serving in the Peruvian Navy as late as the 2010s. Other ships of the class were sold for civilian use postwar, with a few converted as passenger ships and one converted as a luxury yacht.

Twenty-seven vessels of the class (including three vessels converted to PGM-9-class motor gunboats) were lost during World War II (seven losses), several other later armed conflicts (seven losses) and in peacetime incidents, mostly Pacific Ocean typhoons.

Following World War II, ships of the class were involved in several large and small conflicts from the late 1940s to the 1970s, including the 1948 Arab–Israeli War; the Korean War; the 1961 Bay of Pigs Invasion in Cuba; armed clashes between the Republic of China and the People's Republic of China including the 1954–55 First Taiwan Strait Crisis and the 1965 Battle of Dongshan; the Nigerian Civil War of 1967–1970; and the Vietnam War.

One member of the class, USS PC-1264, was one of only two ships in the United States Navy during World War II that had a mostly African-American crew.

== Design ==
The PC-461-class submarine chasers were based on two experimental steel-hulled submarine chasers built under the Experimental Small Craft program initiated on 17 May 1938 – PC-451 and PC-452. The keel of PC-451 was laid down on 28 September 1939 by the Defoe Boat and Motor Works in Bay City, Michigan. She was launched on 23 May 1940 and commissioned on 12 August the same year. She displaced 374 tons, was 163 feet (49.68 m) long, had a beam of 20 feet 9 inches (6.32 m) and had a top speed of 18.8 knots. PC-452 was laid down by Defoe on 14 March 1940 and was launched on 23 August 1941. She was not commissioned until 26 July 1943, having been towed to the Philadelphia Navy Yard after her launch and fitted out with steam turbine propulsion (unlike PC-451, which had diesel engines), consisting of two Beasler boilers supplying a pair of De Laval turbines. Other than the propulsion, PC-452 was closer to the PC-461s than PC-451, having a length of 173 feet 8 inches (52.93 m) and a beam of 23 feet (7.01 m), but she had a smaller displacement than PC-451 at 348 tons.

The PC-461-class submarine chasers had the same propulsion as PC-451 and were dimensionally the same as PC-452 (length of 173 feet 8 inches (52.93 m) and 23 feet (7.01 m) in beam). Each ship had two 1,440-brake-horsepower (1,070 kW) diesel engines fueled by diesel oil, driving two propellers via a reduction gearbox. Two six-cylinder diesel auxiliary engines were also installed, each driving a 120-volt 500-ampere DC generator. Fuel capacity was 49 tons. Their superstructure was short, ending with a deck for the ships' dinghy amidships, aft of a false funnel (the engine exhaust openings were on the sides of the hull). They were designed to have a draft of 10 feet 10 inches (3.30 m), a top speed of 20.2 knots and a crew of four officers and 61 ratings, for a total complement of 65.

=== Armament ===
Provision was made for two main guns – either the 3-inch/50-caliber (76mm, 3.8m-long barrel) quick-firing dual-purpose gun or the Bofors 40 mm anti-aircraft gun could be fitted, one forward of the superstructure and one aft – and anti-submarine equipment, including a pair of depth charge rails on the stern. The lead ship of the class, USS PC-461, was armed with two 3-inch guns, two 20mm cannon, two M2 Browning .50-caliber machine guns, two M1919 Browning .30 caliber machine guns, two depth charge projectors and the depth charge rails. As World War II progressed, there were several variations in the ships' installed armament, including the addition of a pair of Mousetrap anti-submarine rocket launchers on the bow. For example, USS PC-1119, commissioned in December 1942, had two 3-inch guns, five Oerlikon 20 mm cannon, two depth charge projectors, the depth charge rails and the pair of Mousetraps; the armament of USS PC-1145 (commissioned in late October 1943) consisted of one 3-inch gun, one 40mm Bofors gun, three 20mm cannon, four K-gun depth charge projectors, the Mousetraps and the depth charge rails; while USS PC-1137 (also commissioned in October 1943) had one 3-inch gun, one 40mm Bofors gun, five 20mm cannon and two each of K-guns, Mousetraps and depth charge rails. All ships were fitted with sonar and a radar was installed from late 1942 onwards.

== Construction program ==
Several companies were awarded contracts to build the PC-461-class submarine chasers, including Commercial Iron Works – which built 43 ships of the class – and Albina Engine & Machine Works (builder of 21 ships) in Portland, Oregon; the Brown Shipbuilding Company (12 ships) of Houston, Texas; the Consolidated Shipbuilding Corporation (51 ships) of Morris Heights, New York; the Defoe Shipbuilding Company (the renamed Defoe Boat and Motor Works, that had built PC-451 and PC-452 and was the most prolific builder of PC-461s, with 56 completed); Dravo Corporation (15 ships) of Pittsburgh, Pennsylvania, the Gibbs Gas Engine Company (14 ships) of Jacksonville, Florida; the Jeffersonville Boat and Machinery Company (eight ships, seven of which went on to serve with allied navies) of Jeffersonville, Indiana; George Lawley & Son (23 ships) of Neponset, Massachusetts; the Luders Marine Construction Company (22 ships) of Stamford, Connecticut; the Nashville Bridge Company (14 ships) of Nashville, Tennessee; the Penn-Jersey Shipbuilding Company (four ships) of Camden, New Jersey; the Leathem D. Smith Shipbuilding Company (42 ships built) of Sturgeon Bay, Wisconsin; and the Sullivan Drydock and Repair Corporation (16 ships) of Brooklyn, New York.

Just as the ships themselves were constructed by a variety of different companies, the engines were manufactured by several companies including Fairbanks-Morse (38D 8-1/8 engines), General Motors (Cleveland Diesel Engine Division 16-258S and 16-278A engines) and Hooven-Owens-Rentschler (R-99DA engines). The reduction gearboxes were manufactured by Farrel-Birmingham and Westinghouse. The manufacturers of the auxiliary engines included the Buda Engine Company (844-cubic-inch (13.83 L) six-cylinder inline engines).

USS PC-483 was the first ship to be laid down – on 31 December 1940 (almost a year before the United States entered World War II following the Japanese attack on Pearl Harbor on 7 December 1941) at Consolidated Shipbuilding in Morris Heights, New York. She was launched on 25 October 1941 and commissioned on 12 March 1942. The second and third ships laid down were USS PC-488 (on 7 March 1941) and USS PC-489 (ten days later on 17 March); both were built in New York by the Sullivan Dry Dock and Repair Company. USS PC-471 was the first ship to be completed; laid down on 21 April 1941 at Defoe Shipbuilding in Bay City, Michigan, she was launched on 15 September and commissioned on 3 November. Defoe Shipbuilding also built the second in the class to enter service; USS PC-472, which was laid down on 1 July 1941, launched on 14 November and commissioned two days after Pearl Harbor was attacked (on 9 December 1941). The ship the class was named after, USS PC-461, was the third of the class to be built, being laid down by Lawley & Son at Neponset, Massachusetts on 10 July 1941 and launched on 23 December. By the end of 1941, a fourth ship had been commissioned and another thirteen launched, while 36 more had been laid down.

A total of 341 ships in the class were completed; these were United States Ships PC-461 to PC-496, PC-542 to PC-627, PC-776 to PC-825, PC-1077 to PC-1091, PC-1119 to PC-1149, PC-1167 to PC-1265 and PC-1546 to PC-1569. Contracts for another 60 ships (that were proposed as PC-1092 to PC-1118, PC-1150 to PC-1166 and PC-1570 to PC-1585) were canceled.

The last ship built as a PC-461 was USS PC-1569, which was laid down on 26 September 1944 by Leathem D. Smith Shipbuilding and launched on 9 December. She was commissioned on 14 March 1945 at New Orleans. She served in the USN for less than 18 months, being decommissioned on 9 August 1946 and laid up in the Columbia River Group of the navy's Pacific Reserve Fleet. (She later saw active service again in the Republic of Vietnam Navy, after she was transferred to South Vietnamese ownership in November 1960 and renamed RVNS Van Don.)

Although she was launched on 13 May 1944, USS PC-814 was the last ship of the class to be commissioned, on 5 June 1945.

=== Conversions ===
==== Conversions to gunboats ====
Twenty-four PC-461s were converted to patrol gunboats, motor (hull classification symbol PGM). The ships PC-805, PC-806, PC-1088 to PC-1091, PC-1148, PC-1189, PC-1255, PC-1548, PC-1550 to PC-1559 and PC-1565 to PC-1568 were converted to PGM-9-class motor gunboats, some after being commissioned as PC-461-class ships, some after they were launched but before they were commissioned and others being converted during construction. PC-1548 was converted as the lead ship of the class, USS PGM-9.

The last of all ships laid down as a PC-461 to be completed was USS PGM-15, which was laid down by George Lawley & Son on 15 June 1945 and launched six-and-a-half weeks later on 31 July, then commissioned on 11 October – almost two months after the announcement of Japan's surrender on 14 August 1945.

==== Conversions from minesweepers ====
The eighteen Adroit-class minesweepers built for the USN were also based on the two experimental submarine chasers PC-451 and PC-452. They differed little from the PC-461s, primarily in having a slightly longer superstructure that surrounded the false funnel and in being fitted with minesweeping equipment instead of the aft gun; all but four also had less-powerful propulsion consisting of two 900 hp Cooper-Bessemer diesel engines, resulting in a speed of 16 knots. These minesweepers were converted to submarine chasers and reclassified as PC-1586 to PC-1603.

== World War II service ==
PC-461-class successes in World War II
Ship	Date	Details	Location
USS PC-566	30 Jul. '42	Sank German submarine U-166	Gulf of Mexico
USS PC-565	2 Jun. '43	Sank German submarine U-521	Atlantic Ocean off the Eastern Shore of Virginia, USA
USS PC-487	10 Jun. '43	Sank Japanese submarine I-24	Bering Sea
USS PC-543	10 Jul. '43	Shot down two bombers during invasion of Sicily	Near Gela, Sicily
USS PC-624	30 Jul. '43	Sank German submarine U-375	Mediterranean Sea near the island of Pantelleria
USS PC-1135	19 Mar. '44	Participated in attack that sank Japanese submarine I-32	Pacific Ocean south of Wotje Atoll
USS PC-545	24 Mar. '44	Sank a German E-boat	Tyrrhenian Sea near Anzio, Italy
USS PC-619	17 Apr. '44	Participated in attack that sank German submarine U-986	North Atlantic Ocean southwest of Ireland
USS PC-558	9 May '44	Sank a German Neger one-man torpedo-carrying craft; shared with USS PC-626 in sinking of another	Off the coast of Italy
USS PC-626	9 May '44	Shared with USS PC-558 in sinking of a Neger	Off the coast of Italy
USS PC-627	14 May '44	Sank an Italian torpedo boat	Off Anzio, Italy
USS PC-619	10 Jun. '44	Shot down a German bomber	Baie de Seine, off the Normandy invasion beachhead
USS PC-1119	23-25 Oct. '44	Shot down three Japanese aircraft	Off the coast of Leyte, Philippines

During World War II, PC-461-class submarine chasers were used in the Pacific Theater, the Atlantic, the Caribbean and the Mediterranean. They were based as far afield as the Panama Canal Zone, the Aleutian Islands, North Africa and Australia. The first ship of the class to enter service was USS PC-471; after being commissioned on 3 November 1941 she arrived at Boston Navy Yard from Defoe Shipbuilding's yard on 28 November. From there she began her shakedown cruise on 2 January 1942. After commencing active service, she carried out patrol and convoy escort duties on the US eastern seaboard and in the Mediterranean Sea. On 9 June 1944 (three days after the Normandy landings began), she was transferred to the Free French Naval Forces (FFN) and renamed L'Eveille.

=== Successes against submarines ===
Only six ships of the class actually sank a submarine. On 30 July 1942, USS PC-566 commanded by Lieutenant Commander (later Captain) Herbert G. Claudius attacked and sank U-166 in the Gulf of Mexico, after the U-boat had torpedoed and sunk the passenger ship SS Robert E. Lee, which was carrying survivors of other ships sunk by submarines. USS PC-566 had been commissioned less than two months earlier, on 15 June 1942.

On 2 June 1943 USS PC-565 was escorting a convoy from New York along the US eastern seaboard to Cuba under the command of Lieutenant Walter T. Flynn when her sonar registered an underwater contact. She prosecuted the sonar contact by dropping depth charges, which forced the German submarine U-521 to the surface. The U-boat was already sinking as PC-565 brought it under 20mm cannon fire and it soon disappeared underwater; the U-boat's commander was the only survivor. The elapsed time between the dropping of the first depth charges and the U-boat's sinking was ten minutes.

The third success against a submarine was that of USS PC-487, which sank the Japanese submarine I-24 in the Bering Sea some 40 miles (60 km) north-northeast of Shemya, one of the Aleutian Islands between Alaska and Russia, on 10 June 1943. PC-487 began her attack by launching depth charges, forcing the submarine to the surface, whereupon I-24 was rammed by PC-487, was hit several times by shellfire and then rammed a second time, finally sinking 25 minutes after PC-487's crew first sighted her.

Seven weeks later on 30 July, the USS PC-624 attacked and sank the German submarine U-375 off the northwest coast of the island of Malta in the Mediterranean Sea. (PC-624 went on to have a varied career. On 12 March 1944 she ran aground on the coast of Sicily near Palermo. Following repairs she was reclassified as a Self Propelled Water Barge and renamed YW-120 on the last day of June 1944; on 22 November 1944 she was decommissioned and transferred to the FFN. In 1949 she was returned to the USN, reclassified as a Non-Self Propelled Water Barge and renamed YWN-120.)

On 23 March 1944 an encrypted radio message sent by Japanese submarine I-32 was intercepted and decrypted by the USN's Fleet Radio Unit Pacific. I-32′s message had information that allowed the USN to ascertain its location, so a Hunter-killer Group comprising USS PC-1135; the destroyers USS Hull and USS Halsey Powell; and the destroyer escort USS Manlove was dispatched to intercept it. At 4:22 the following morning the ships were 50 nautical miles (90 km; 60 mi) south of Wotje Atoll in the Marshall Islands in the mid-Pacific when Manlove's radar detected a surfaced submarine at a range of 5 nautical miles (9 km; 6 mi). The submarine submerged when Manlove was 3,000 yards (2,740 m) away, but she quickly gained sonar contact on the submarine and Halsey Powell began a series of attacks, expending all of her depth charges. Manlove and PC-1135 then attacked, Manlove with depth charges and Hedgehog salvos and PC-1135 with Mousetrap rockets. Manlove and PC-1135 were credited with the submarine's sinking.

Three-and-a-half weeks later on the afternoon of 17 April in the North Atlantic Ocean, in the area of the Porcupine Seabight southwest of Ireland and west of Land's End, USS PC-619 was escorting a convoy from New York to Plymouth in England when her sonar detected an underwater contact. She and the Royal Navy destroyer HMS Swift prosecuted the contact, with PC-619 launching a salvo of Mousetrap rockets. One of the rockets in the first salvo exploded (Mousetrap rockets only exploded if they hit a solid object). PC-619 made three more attacking runs across the location of the sonar contact and after the fourth run an oil slick appeared on the surface. PC-619 and Swift were later credited with the sinking of the German submarine U-986.

=== Other active duty ===
Numerous PC-461-class vessels were used to aid in amphibious assaults, including the Normandy landings, where USS PC-552 directed maritime traffic to one of the sectors on Omaha Beach during the day of the initial landings on 6 June 1944. Thirty-two of these ships were formally reclassified as amphibious control craft on 20 August 1945, a few days after the surrender of Japanese forces was announced. After this date, the ships PC-462, PC-463, PC-466, PC-469, PC-549, PC-555, PC-563, PC-578, PC-582, PC-588, PC-589, PC-598, PC-802 to PC-804, PC-807, PC-1079 to PC-1081, PC-1126, PC-1127, PC-1136, PC-1137, PC-1168, PC-1169, PC-1177, PC-1178, PC-1180, PC-1230, PC-1231, PC-1244 and PC-1251 used the hull classification symbol PCC with the same numbers they had previously. Three other ships reclassified as amphibious control craft were former Adroit-class minesweepers originally commissioned as USS Exploit (PC-1599 after being reclassified as a submarine chaser, then PCC-1599), USS Fierce (PC-1601 then PCC-1601) and USS Firm (PC-1602, PCC-1602).

Just before midnight on the night of 5–6 March 1943, in a case of mistaken identity, PC-1123 rammed the wooden-hull Canadian Fairmile B ship USS SC-1470, a US Navy SC-1466-class submarine chaser, off Alligator Reef, Florida. PC-1123's crew thought they were attacking a surfaced U-boat. PC-1123 then towed SC-1470 to the mouth of the Miami River. After reaching port in Miami, SC-1470 was deemed uneconomical to repair.

PC-461-class losses in World War II
Ship	Date	Details	Location
USS PC-496	4 Jun. '43	Torpedoed by submarine	Mediterranean Sea off Tunisia
USS PC-558	9 May '44	Torpedoed by submarine	Tyrrhenian Sea near Salerno, Italy
USS PC-1261	6 Jun. '44	Surface action; shellfire from land-based artillery	Baie de Seine off the coast of Normandy, France
L'Enjoue	11 Jan. '45	Torpedoed by submarine	Strait of Gibraltar off Cape Spartel, Morocco
USS PC-1129	31 Jan. '45	Surface action; Shin'yō suicide boat	Nasugbu Bay, Nasugbu, Luzon, the Philippines
L'Ardent	15 Feb. '45	Collided with a cargo ship	Cora Harbour, Morocco
USS PGM-18	7 Apr. '45	Struck a mine	Nakagusuku Bay, Okinawa

On 4 June 1943, USS PC-496 was sunk off the coast of Tunisia by an Italian submarine. On 10 July 1943, on the first day of the Allied invasion of Sicily, USS PC-543 shot down two enemy bombers while stationed off the landing beaches at Gela. On 18 July, USS PC-562 was damaged when she struck a mine off the coast of Sicily. USS PC-545, which was crewed by members of the United States Coast Guard, was involved with the landings on Sicily; the landings at Salerno that began the Allied invasion of Italy; the Battle of Anzio – during which she sank a German E-boat on 19 March 1944; and the landings that marked the beginning of Operation Dragoon, the invasion of Southern France. (She went on to serve into the 1960s, as Goumier from October 1944 with the FFN and the French Navy; and as Agadir in the Royal Moroccan Navy.)

USS PC-546 also served at Sicily, Salerno and during Operation Dragoon; she also rescued survivors from the John S. Copley, an American cargo ship that was sunk off the coast of Algeria by the German submarine U-73 on 16 December 1943. Another ship that participated in the three landings of the Italian campaign and in the Operation Dragoon landings was USS PC-621. She was damaged on 10 July 1943 while supporting the landings on the first day of the invasion of Sicily, when she collided with USS LST-345, an LST-1-class Landing Ship, Tank (LST). On 23 February 1944 she sank a German E-boat and forced another E-boat aground while protecting the Anzio beachhead. Five weeks later on 2 April, she was damaged in an attack by German aircraft while stationed off Anzio. She went on to be decommissioned from the USN on 31 October 1944 and transferred to the FFN renamed as Fantassin. (She served in the French Navy post-war and was stationed in Algeria during the Algerian War of Independence; the ships of the French Navy imposed a blockade of Algeria in an attempt to prevent arms from reaching the independence fighters.)

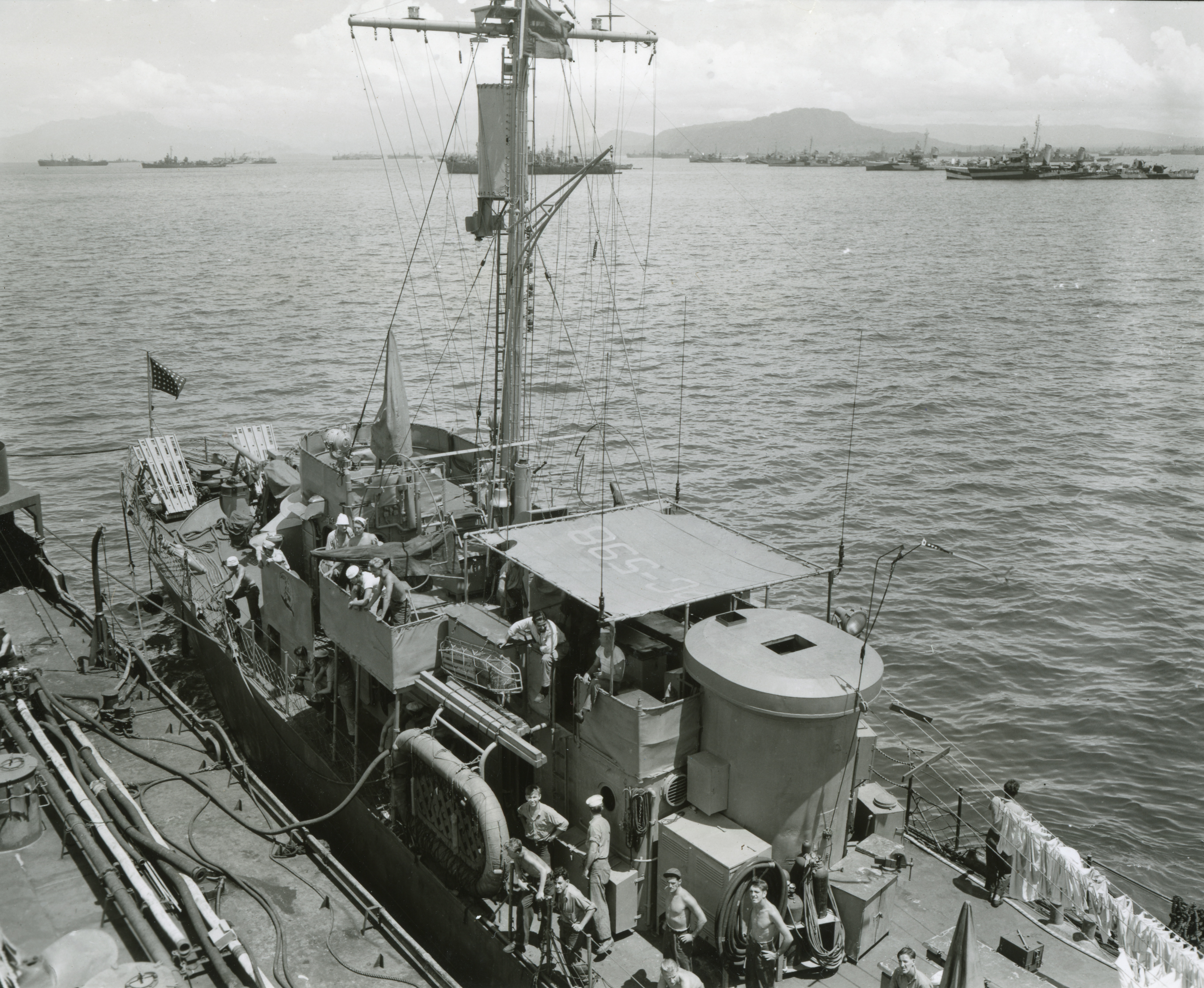
USS PC-598 tied up at Humboldt Bay in New Guinea in October 1944, during preparations for the invasion of Leyte in the Philippines. A pair of Mousetrap anti-submarine weapons can be seen on her bow.

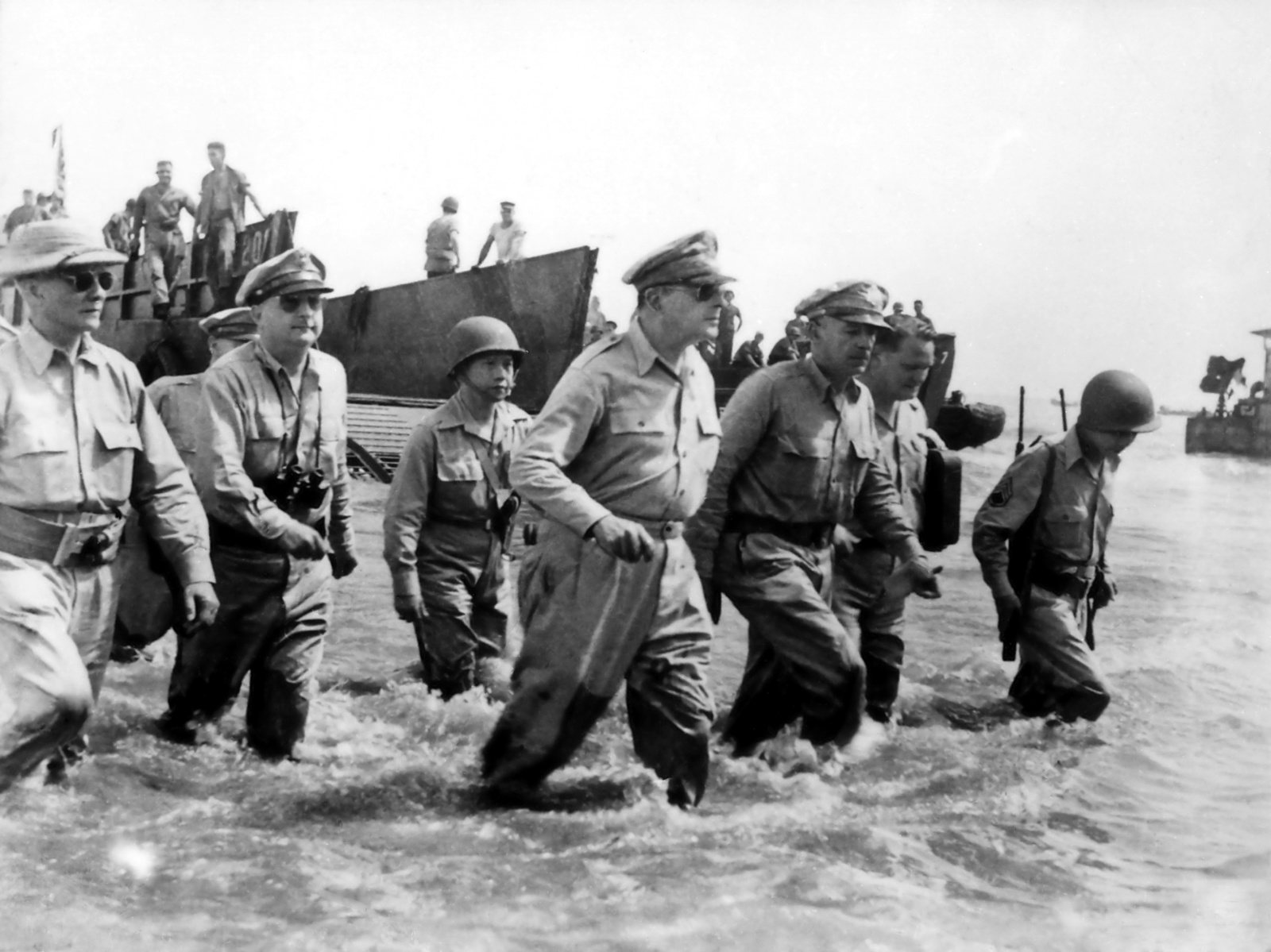
General Douglas MacArthur wades ashore at Red Beach on 20 October 1944 on the first day of the Battle of Leyte in the Philippines. USS PC-598 performed maritime traffic control duties as an amphibious landing control craft off Red Beach that day.

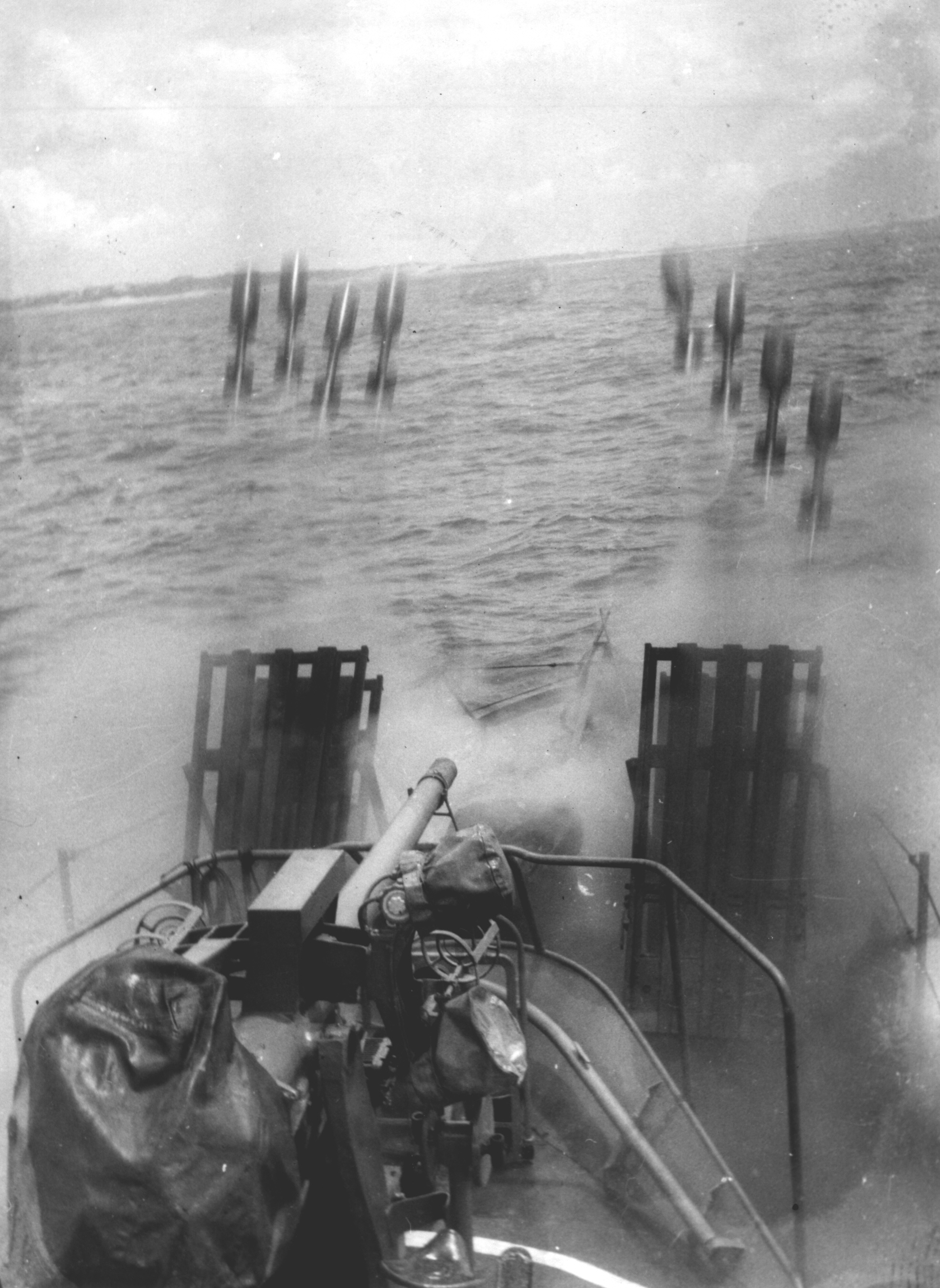
A salvo of rocket-propelled bombs is launched by a pair of Mousetrap anti-submarine weapons mounted on the bow of the Brazilian Navy PC-461-class submarine chaser Guajará during an exercise.

In late March 1944, USS PC-556, USS PC-558 and USS PC-626 were engaged in an antisubmarine operation with destroyers of the Royal Navy and USN off Sicily that resulted in the sinking of the German submarine U-223. On 9 May 1944, USS PC-558 sank a German Neger one-man torpedo-carrying craft off the coast of Italy and, with USS PC-626, sank a second Neger before she herself was sunk near Salerno by the German submarine U-230. Thirty survivors from PC-558 were subsequently rescued by USS PC-1235. The next day, USS PC-556 was damaged in an attack by enemy aircraft while stationed in support of the Battle of Anzio. Four days later on 14 May, USS PC-627 was stationed off Anzio when she attacked and sank an Italian torpedo boat.

During the Normandy landings on 6 June 1944, USS PC-1261 was assigned to direct the maritime traffic to Utah Beach, but was sunk by shellfire from German shore batteries at 05:42 while stationed off the Îles Saint-Marcouf; she was the first USN ship lost on D-Day. The loss of PC-1261 and the disabling of another control craft led to the first wave landings at Utah Beach being in the wrong place, which contributed to their early success as the beach was more lightly defended. One of the two remaining control craft for Utah Beach was USS PC-1176, whose commander Lieutenant Howard Vander Beek contributed to the success of the landings by his decisions that morning. Four days later on 10 June, PC-619 shot down a German Heinkel He 177 bomber while station offshore from the Normandy beachheads, then rescued the bomber's surviving crewmember.

On 4 September 1944, USS PC-598 served as an amphibious landing control craft during the landings on the beach code-named White Beach 2 that opened the invasion of Peleliu in the Pacific island hopping campaign. She performed the same role during the Philippines campaign – on 20 October 1944 on the first day of the landings on Leyte, on Red Beach (where General Douglas MacArthur waded ashore); and on 9 January 1945 at White Beach 2 for the invasion of Lingayen Gulf on the first day of the Battle of Luzon. She again acted as a control craft at three landings conducted as part of the 1945 Battle of Okinawa in the Japan campaign, stationed at Blue Beach on the first day of the invasion of Okinawa on 1 April; during landings on the small island of Iheya Shima off the northwest coast of Okinawa on 3 June; and landings on Aguni Shima west of Okinawa on 9 June. Another PC-461 that acted as a control craft during the landings on Letye on 20 October 1944 was USS PC-470. Stationed off the beachhead, she came under fire from Japanese artillery on-shore several times; on 27 October one shell hit her and exploded in a forward compartment, killing one of her crew and causing significant damage. She was repaired in time for her to take part in the Lingayen Gulf landings on 9 January 1945.

In late October 1944, USS PC-623 and USS PC-1119 rescued survivors of the escort carrier USS Gambier Bay, the destroyer USS Hoel and the destroyer escort USS Samuel B. Roberts; all three ships were sunk on 25 October during the Battle off Samar in the Philippines. USS PC-623 had previously participated in the Mariana and Palau Islands campaign between 6 September and 14 October. USS PC-1119 had previously seen extensive combat as she supported numerous landings in the New Guinea campaign and the Philippines campaign, including shooting down three Japanese aircraft in the days leading up to her rescuing survivors from Gambier Bay. Also in the Pacific, on 12 November 1944, USS PC-1260 was damaged in a collision with the Liberty ship USS Kenmore, a Crater-class cargo ship. Twelve days later on 24 November, USS PC-1124 was badly damaged in an attack by Japanese dive bombers off the island of Leyte in the Philippines while she was being replenished with fresh water. Following the attack she was used as a floating barracks, reclassified as an Unclassified Miscellaneous Auxiliary and renamed as USS Chocura on 20 February 1945 with the hull number IX 206.

L'Enjoue of the FFN, formerly the USS PC-482, was sunk on 11 January 1945 by the German submarine U-870 off Cape Spartel, Morocco, near the western entrance to the Mediterranean Sea. Her entire crew was lost. On 29 January, USS PC-588 was damaged when the cargo ship USS Serpens was destroyed in an explosion while she was being loaded with munitions at Lunga Point on the island of Guadalcanal in the Solomon Islands. On 31 January, PC-1129 was off Nasugbu on the island of Luzon in the Philippines, when she was sunk in an attack by a Japanese Shin'yō suicide boat.

The following month on 15 February, L'Ardent of the FFN, formerly USS PC-473, sank in Cora Harbour, Morocco, after she collided with the British refrigerated cargo ship SS Empire Abbey. On 24 February, USS PC-578 was damaged in a collision with USS LSM-207 (an LSM-1-class landing ship medium) while supporting the invasion of Iwo Jima in the Pacific. On 8 March 1945, USS PC-564 was badly damaged during the Granville raid, in an action against a flotilla comprising four German minesweepers and nine other craft. She was deliberately grounded at Pointe du Grouin on the coast of Brittany in France; fourteen of her crew were taken prisoner by the Germans after they abandoned ship. This was the second attempt by the German forces stationed on the Channel Islands to raid Granville; an attempt a month earlier on the night of 6–7 February was abandoned after a German E-boat in the attacking force was sighted and engaged by another PC-461 patrolling that night, USS PC-522. PC-564 was refloated and repaired, and went on to serve in South Korea as ROKS Seoraksan in the 1960s, being eventually decommissioned in 1974.

USS PC-1255 was commissioned on 1 September 1944. Three weeks later she was placed in reduced commission in Miami and work began to convert her to a PGM-9-class motor gunboat. Work was completed on 28 November 1944 and she was recommissioned as USS PGM-18. She arrived at Eniwetok Atoll on 6 March 1945; during the voyage from Hawaii the crew of the US cargo ship SS Minot Victory mistook her for a Japanese submarine and opened fire without hitting her. PGM-18 was supporting minesweeping operations during the Battle of Okinawa on 7 April 1945 when she struck a mine in Okinawa's Nakagusuku Bay; she rolled over and sank with the loss of thirteen of her crew. This was the last combat loss of a current or former PC-461-class ship in World War II. On 12 July 1945 USS PC-582 was damaged in a grounding incident in Maglagabon Bay off the island of Samar in the Philippines. She eventually served in the Venezuelan Navy as Albatross during the 1960s).

On 21 July 1945, a convoy of six LSTs and the navy stores ship USS Adria, escorted by the PC-461s USS PC-803, PC-804, PC-807 and PC-1251, USS Underhill (a destroyer escort), the PCE-842-class patrol craft USS PCE-872 and the wooden-hull SC-497-class submarine chasers USS SC-1306 and SC-1309, departed Okinawa carrying soldiers of the 96th Infantry Division (where it had been deployed in the invasion forces) to the Philippines. Earlier in the month, six Japanese submarines sortied from port over a period of several days; each was carrying six kaiten – manned torpedoes designed to be used in suicide attacks. On the afternoon of 24 July one of the submarines, I-53, intercepted the convoy and launched a kaiten to attack Underhill. I-53 was detected on sonar and PC-504 attacked her with depth charges, forcing her to periscope depth, whereupon Underhill tried to ram her, without success. Crew on board PC-504 then spotted a periscope as the kaiten passed beneath her and surfaced near Underhill, too close for Underhill's guns to engage. The commander of Underhill ordered that the kaiten be rammed, but as she did so the kaiten detonated and in a second large explosion, everything forward of the ship's smokestack was destroyed. PC-803 and PC-804 rescued survivors from the still-floating aft part of the ship at 18:00 and then sank it with their guns. Underhill was one of only two ships sunk in kaiten actions during the war and was the last USN destroyer escort lost in the war; the USN lost just two more ships and a submarine in combat between Underhill's sinking and the end of the war.

Following the surrender of German forces on 8 May 1945, some PC-461s remained in Europe to serve as part of the Allied forces that occupied Germany. Among them was PC-619, which became the senior ship of the USN's Twelfth Fleet as US forces in Europe were reduced. PC-619 was the first US warship to enter the two ports of Bremen (at Bremen itself and Bremerhaven) on the river Weser in Germany. Her duties while stationed at Bremen included searching German vessels as they entered port or departed and guiding maritime traffic through the minefields in the river. She left Germany for the US in early October 1945.

After USS PC-1181 was commissioned on 17 September 1943, she carried out convoy escort duties from November 1943, initially between New York and Cuba, then later to and from the Panama Canal as well. As the end of the war with Germany approached and the need for convoys ended, she was stationed at the USN base at Coco Solo, Panama, where she was used as a simulated target for submarines during training exercises until the end of the war.

During World War II, the racial segregation of the United States Armed Forces, including the USN, was official policy and the vast majority of African-Americans serving in the USN were not permitted to do so in combat roles. One member of the PC-461 class, USS PC-1264 (launched on 28 November 1943 and commissioned on 25 April 1944), was one of only two warships in the USN that had a mostly African-American crew. (The other was the destroyer escort USS Mason.) The only African-American officer to serve on PC-1264 was Samuel L. Gravely Jr., making him the first African-American officer of a USN warship. Gravely later became the first African-American flag officer in the USN.

The first commander of USS PC-815 on her commissioning in April 1943 was L. Ron Hubbard, the future founder of the Church of Scientology. The American future actor Kirk Douglas served on board USS PC-1139 as her communications officer and gunnery officer, with the rank of Ensign. In his autobiography The Ragman's Son, Douglas recounted his service on board PC-1139 and the day he was injured. On 7 February 1944 PC-1139 was working a sonar contact in the South Pacific. After a salvo of Mousetrap rockets was launched towards the location of the contact and one of them exploded (Mousetrap rockets exploded only when they hit a solid object), PC-1139's commander ordered that a dye marker depth charge be launched as the ship drifted above the location of the sonar contact. Douglas was at his combat station by the depth charge launchers on the stern and relayed the command, but a crewmember misunderstood and launched a standard depth charge instead, which exploded underneath the ship. Douglas was thrown into a bulkhead by the force of the explosion and received a stomach injury.

=== Lend-Lease program ===
As part of the Lend-Lease program enacted by US president Franklin D. Roosevelt, a total of 41 PC-461s were lent to allies of the United States. Thirty-two were transferred to France, Brazil received eight and Uruguay received one.

=== Presentation ships ===
Three PC-461s were transferred to foreign navies as gifts from the United States. The first was USS PC-468. After she was commissioned on 30 June 1942, she was transferred to the Netherlands five weeks later on 6 August and renamed as HNLMS Queen Wilhelmina. Two days later she was officially presented to Queen Wilhelmina of the Netherlands by President Roosevelt.

On 16 September 1942, PC-467 was handed over to the Royal Norwegian Navy and was renamed as HNoMS King Haakon VII in a ceremony at Washington Naval Yard. President Roosevelt and Crown Princess Märtha of Norway were in attendance at the ceremony, during which Roosevelt gave his "Look to Norway" speech.

USS PC-622 was commissioned on 9 March 1943 and three months later on 10 June, she was presented to the Greek government-in-exile by President Roosevelt at the Washington Navy Yard; she served in the Royal Hellenic Navy as the HS Vassilefs Georghios II.

== Post- World War II service ==
=== US Navy ===
After the capture of Okinawa at the end of June 1945, the US assembled a huge armada at Naval Base Buckner Bay in Okinawa's Nakagusuku Bay for the proposed Operation Olympic, the first phase of Operation Downfall - the invasion of the Japanese homeland. Following the end of World War II in mid-August, some PC-461-class ships were among the hundreds of ships that were still in the bay during the first weeks of the occupation of Japan while awaiting further disposition. On 9 October 1945, Typhoon Louise struck Okinawa, including the Buckner Bay base. A total of ten PC-461s were among the twelve USN ships and craft sunk, the 32 so badly damaged that they were declared total losses and the 222 ships and small craft grounded in and around Nakagusuku Bay by the typhoon. Of the ten PC-461s, USS PC-590 broke in two and sank; while PC-814 was sunk off the coast of Okinawa on 10 October. PC-1238 capsized after she was grounded in the bay, but she was refloated, only to be decommissioned and sold for scrap. USS PC-584, USS PCC-1126, USS PC-1128 and USS PC-1239 were grounded and were later deemed uneconomical to repair; these ships were stripped of useful parts and the hulks were abandoned where they lay then were later destroyed by demolition. USS PC-1120, USS PCC-1178 and USS PC-1245 were grounded but were subsequently refloated and placed back in service. Meanwhile, a month earlier on 11 September, USS PC-815 was cut in two in a collision with the destroyer USS Laffey in heavy fog and sank off San Diego, California; one crew member was killed.

After the war, USS PC-577 was transferred to the United States Army's Chemical Warfare Center at Edgewood Arsenal in the Aberdeen Proving Ground complex in Maryland and used for chemical warfare tests. Heavily contaminated by the tests, she was sunk at sea between the US and Bermuda on 12 November 1948.

USS PC-618 was the USN's longest-serving PC-461. Commissioned on 7 September 1942, in April 1947 she was reclassified as an Experimental Submarine Chaser with the hull classification symbol EPC. During 1951 she was used as the test vessel in trials to measure underwater noise generated by surface craft. On 15 February 1956 she was renamed USS Weatherford. She was finally decommissioned on 1 November 1965 and was eventually sunk on 1 November 1968 as a target during a naval exercise – one of several PC-461s to play this final role for various navies (most recently in 2018).

A few other PC-461s were redeployed as training ships, but most were decommissioned from the USN within a year or two of the war's end and either placed into reserve squadrons, or transferred to the United States Maritime Commission for disposal then sold for scrap or for civilian service. One of the ships used as a training vessel, USS PC-1168, became a movie star. In 1950 the USN made her available for use to film the 20th Century Fox movie U.S.S. Teakettle (later renamed You're in the Navy Now).

In 1960 the USN took two ships, USS Riverhead (the former USS PC-567) and USS Altus (PC-568) out of reserve and loaned them to the United States Air Force (USAF). In 1963 they were permanently transferred to the USAF.

Some PC-461s decommissioned from the USN were furnished to American allies around the world, most notably the Republic of China and the newly established Republic of Korea.

=== China ===
In 1948 twelve vessels, consisting of six PC-461s and six PGM-9-class motor gunboats, were sold to the Republic of China for service with the Republic of China Navy (ROCN), with another being bought from a civilian company in the US the following year. The Chinese Civil War came to its conclusion in late 1949 with the Nationalist government ousted by the Communist takeover, resulting in the retreat of the Republic of China to Taiwan. Two of the PC-461s and three of the PGM-9s remained in Communist hands and were incorporated into the People's Liberation Army Navy (PLAN). They served in the PLAN into the 1970s.

Of the vessels remaining in the ROCN after the retreat to Taiwan, two of the PC-461s were decommissioned in 1952. In 1954 the ROCN's fleet was expanded again by the transfer from the US of nine PC-461s and one PGM-9; the PC-461s were later known as Qing Jiang-class submarine chasers and the PGM-9s were known as Yin Jiang-class coastal gunboats. The lead ship of the Qing Jiang-class was the former film star PC-1168; she had been decommissioned from the USN in May 1954.

Two of the Yin Jiangs were sunk off Kinmen Island in attacks by PLAN motor torpedo boats during the First Taiwan Strait Crisis; Lin Jiang (laid down as PC-1089, commissioned by the USN as PGM-13) was sunk on 10 January 1955, while Yin Jiang (laid down and launched as PC-1551, commissioned as PGM-20) herself was sunk ten days later on 20 January. In 1957 another five PC-461s were transferred under the United States' Mutual Defense and Assistance Program (MDAP). On 2 September 1958, during the Second Taiwan Strait Crisis, two of the ROCN's Qing Jiangs clashed with the PLAN off Kinmen. Tuo Jiang (formerly PC-1247) was damaged and disabled during the engagement and had to be towed back to Taiwan. She was never repaired and was decommissioned in 1959; another ship (the former USS Milledgeville, originally USS PC-1263) was transferred from the US to replace her the same year and was also named Tuo Jiang. As a result of the losses, decommissionings and transfers, the ROCN ended the 1950s with sixteen PC-461s and two PGM-9s in its fleet.

In 1965, the Republic of China's Project National Glory decided to send special forces troops on an intelligence gathering mission on the island of Dongshan; the mission was code named Tsunami Number 1. On the morning of 5 August the Qing Jiang-class ship Zhang Kiang (formerly PC-1232) and the Chien Men-class patrol ship Jian Men (originally built for the USN as an Auk-class minesweeper) left their base at Zuoying to carry out Tsunami Number 1. On the afternoon of 5 August, the two ROCN ships were detected by Chinese radar as they approached Dongshan. In the early hours of 6 August they came under attack south of Kinmen Island by a PLAN South Sea Fleet force of four Type 062 fast patrol craft and eleven Project 183 torpedo boats, in what became known as the Battle of Dongshan. Zhang Kiang and the PLAN fast patrol craft 611 exchanged fire and at one point collided. With all four PLAN Type 062s firing on her, Zhang Kiang exploded, heeled over to port and sank at 03:33. Jian Men was struck by several torpedoes launched by the torpedo boats and sank at 05:22. More than 170 Taiwanese personnel were killed, among them a rear admiral on the Jian Men; 33 survivors were captured by the PLAN.

Following their ROC Navy service, three Qing Jiangs (including the former PC-1142) served in the Inspectorate General of Customs from 1972 until they were decommissioned in the 1980s.

=== South Korea ===
A total of nine PC-461s served in the Republic of Korea Navy (ROKN) as Baekdusan-class submarine chasers. The first ocean-going vessel to be commissioned by the new Republic of Korea Navy was the former USS PC-823. She was in service with the United States Merchant Marine Academy as a training ship under the name Ensign Whitehead in 1949 when she was bought by South Korea for $18,000 with funds raised in part by donations from ROKN personnel; enlisted men gave up five percent of their pay while officers contributed ten percent of their pay. The wives of ROKN personnel also contributed money raised by them doing laundry, while another source of funds was the sale of scrap metal by ROKN midshipmen. On commissioning into the ROKN, Ensign Whitehead was renamed ROKS Baekdusan (PC-701), with the ROKN hull number PC-701. When the Korean War broke out on 25 June 1950, Baekdusan was the only fighting ship available in the South Korean navy. Before the war, another three PC-461s had been bought from the US for the ROKN with the aid of public donations, but just a week before the war began, all three (ROKS Geumgangsan (PC-702), (formerly USS PC-799), ROKS Samkaksan (PC-703), (formerly PCC-802, originally PC-802) and ROKS Jirisan (PC-704) (formerly PC-810)) were still in San Francisco.

Baekdusan and the other available vessels in the ROKN (fifteen ex-USN YMS-1-class minesweepers and former Imperial Japanese Navy minelayers; and an LST) left port on the first day of the war to patrol South Korean waters. On the night of 25–26 June, less than 24 hours after the war began, Baekdusan thwarted an attempt by North Korea to capture the port of Busan by engaging and sinking a North Korean troopship in what became known as the Battle of Korea Strait. One of Baekdusan's crew was killed in the engagement. On 17 July Samkaksan, Geumgangsan and Jirisan arrived in South Korea and were immediately placed on active service. Geumgangsan and Samkaksan traveled up the west coast of North-Korean occupied South Korea and on 27 July bombarded the enemy-held port of Incheon on South Korea's northwest coast, then engaged and sank twelve boats being used to supply North Korean forces with munitions. In mid-August, as preparations were made for the landings at Incheon on 15 September 1950, Jirisan and Samkaksan were involved in the recapture of the islands of Deokjeokdo and Yeongheungdo off Incheon, with Samkaksan putting troops ashore. During late August, Geumgangsan engaged and sank numerous small craft trying to resupply the North Korean forces fighting the Battle of the Pusan Perimeter. In the lead-up to the Incheon landings, all four ROKN submarine chasers were attached to Task Force 90 that had been tasked with carrying out the landings. Samkaksan engaged and sank a North Korean minelayer off Haeju in North Korea on 10 September and three small vessels two days later. The combats of 10 and 12 September were the last significant surface engagements of the war.

In October 1950, United Nations Command (UN) forces were preparing for more amphibious landings, this time at Wonsan on the east coast of North Korea, codenamed Operation Tailboard. Jirisan was involved in the preparations as USN and ROKN minesweepers attempted to clear the approaches to Wonsan of North Korean mines. On 18 October, the minesweeper ROKS Gonju was following Jirisan and a small boat when she set off a magnetic mine in Wonsan harbor west of Kalma Peninsula, broke in two and sank. Jirisan should have been behind Gonju, but Gonju's crew had not acknowledged orders from the commander of Jirisan to take the van. Seventeen of Gonju's crew were killed or missing. The Operation Tailboard landings took place on 26 October and were unopposed, as Wonsan had been captured by UN forces advancing overland more than a fortnight earlier.

Later in the war, after China entered the war on behalf of North Korea then unleashed its Second Phase Offensive, during which the Communist forces recaptured Wonsan in December 1950, the blockade of Wonsan was implemented in mid-February 1951. The ROKN was involved in enforcing the blockade and on 25 December 1951, Samkaksan was relieved from blockade duty by Jirisan. The next day Jirisan struck a mine near the island of Ryŏdo in Wonsan harbor and sank with the loss of all 57 of her crew. In early 1952 another two PC-461s were transferred from the US to the ROKN; these were the former PC-485 and PC-600, which were commissioned into the ROKN as ROKS Hanrasan and Myohyangsan respectively. Naval operations during the remainder of the war mostly consisted of the continuing blockade of Wonsan; mine-clearing; and operations in support of the land forces, including supply missions, bombardment of shore targets and supporting the American, Australian, British and Canadian aircraft carriers deployed to South Korea as their aircraft carried out ground attack and interdiction missions. The Korean Armistice Agreement ended the fighting (and the blockade of Wonsan) on 27 July 1953.

Postwar, in August 1960 Baekdusan, Geumgangsan and Samkaksan were decommissioned and in November 1960 another two PC-461s were transferred from the US to the ROKN. One more PC-461 was transferred from the US to the ROKN in 1964. This came after ROKS Hanrasan was lost on 11 November 1962 – one of two PC-461s sunk at Guam by Typhoon Karen.

=== Philippines ===
Seven PC-461s were commissioned into the Philippine Navy in 1947–48. An eighth ship, the former USS PC-1122 was also transferred to the Philippine Navy in 1948, but was not commissioned, it was instead used for spare parts. The active ships, serving as the Negros Oriental class, were engaged in combat support operations during the Korean War, escorting the ships that transported the Philippine Expeditionary Forces to Korea (PEFTOK). The Philippine Army maintained a Battalion Combat Team (BCT) in the field, with five BCTs serving in total. The first BCT traveled to Korea in September 1950 on a USN Victory ship, the USNS Sgt. Sylvester Antolak, escorted by RPS Capiz (formerly USS PC-1564) and RPS Negros Oriental (formerly USS PC-1563), while the Philippine Navy's LSTs transported the other four, again escorted by submarine chasers. The Philippine Navy lost one ship in 1962; RPS Negros Occidental was the other PC-461 sunk with ROKS Hanrasan by Typhoon Karen as it crossed Guam on 11 November. Another PC-461 (originally USS PC-568) joined the Philippine Navy in 1968 and was commissioned BRP Nueva Viscaya. Prior to her Philippine service, she had served in the USAF as USS Altus during the mid-1960s. Nueva Viscaya sank on 12 November 1990 in the Port of Cebu in Cebu City as a result of Typhoon Mike; she was struck by another ship that had been set adrift by the typhoon. Nueva Viscaya was the last PC-461 in Philippine Navy service.

=== Thailand ===
The former USS PC-493 was also sunk by a typhoon, lost in the Philippines in May 1947 not long after being bought for service with the Royal Thai Navy, but before she could be delivered to Thailand and recommissioned. Five PC-461s were commissioned into the Royal Thai Navy in 1947-48 and another three were commissioned in 1952–53. HTMS Khamronsin (formerly USS PC-609) was damaged by shellfire during the Manhattan Rebellion — a failed coup attempt in Bangkok by elements of the navy on 29–30 June 1951 — and was decommissioned in 1953 without having been repaired. HTMS Phali, the former USS PC-1185, was sunk as a target in 1992, while HTMS Longlom, (originally USS PC-570), HTMS Tongpliu (formerly PC-616), HTMS Sukeip (PC-1218) and HTMS Liulom (PC-1253) were not decommissioned from the Royal Thai Navy until 1994.

=== Other navies ===
Apart from the navies of the Republic of China, the Philippines, South Korea and Thailand, other PC-461s were sold and put into service with the Dominican Navy, which received two as well as one submarine chaser conversion of a former Adroit-class minesweeper in 1946–47; the Mexican Navy, which received nine in 1952; and the Spanish Navy (one vessel, the former PC-1211, bought in October 1956). Greece received six PGM-9-class ships in 1947 to join Vassilefs Georghios II in Hellenic Navy service. In addition to the 32 ships originally transferred from the USN to the FFN during World War II under Lend-Lease, eleven more PC-461s entered service with the French Navy in the late 1940s and early 1950s.

Some of the French Navy PC-461s were transferred again after the countries comprising French Indochina gained their independence. Five were transferred to the navy of South Vietnam in 1955–56. Joined by a sixth vessel transferred to the Republic of Vietnam Navy from the US, South Vietnam had PC-461s serving through much of the duration of the Vietnam War, with the last being decommissioned in 1974.

Another two of the French Navy vessels based in Indochina were transferred to the Royal Cambodian Navy (RCN) following Cambodia's independence. After the victory of the Communist Khmer Rouge in the Cambodian Civil War on 17 April 1975, both of the RCN's PC-461s were used by refugees from the new regime to escape to other countries in May 1975. One was sailed to Thailand while the other sailed to the Philippines, whereupon it became the only ship of the class to serve in four navies – becoming the ninth Philippine Navy PC-461 on her commissioning in 1976 as the second BRP Negros Oriental, replacing the ship (formerly USS PC-1563) that had sunk at Guam in 1962.

The MV Yucatan, formerly the USS PC-1265, was bought in 1948 by an organization that was purchasing weaponry to arm the new state of Israel; she set sail from New Orleans on 4 July 1948, headed for Mexico, where she took on fuel and other supplies. Barely seaworthy, she then sailed for Marseille in southern France for refurbishment, via unscheduled stops in Cuba and Portugal for repairs, eventually arriving in Israel in late September. On her arrival at Haifa, she was commissioned in the Israeli Navy as the INS Noga (sometimes spelled 'Nogah') with the hull number K-26 and, after being quickly fitted out with military equipment, saw action in the 1948 Arab–Israeli War that followed Israel's foundation, including taking part in the operation to attack an Egyptian supply vessel on 18 October. Noga was only able to put to sea for a year, due to a shortage of qualified engineering crew. She remained at Haifa where she was used to support other Israeli Navy vessels when they were in port. She was eventually sunk as a target. A second PC-461, originally USS PC-1188, was commissioned into the Israeli Navy in 1953 and was also named Noga, with the hull number K-22. She was used to support the operations of Shayetet 13, the special forces unit of the Israeli Navy. She was removed from service in the late 1960s and in the 1970s she was sunk as a target in a test of the Israeli Aircraft Industries Gabriel anti-ship missile.

On 29 February 1960 the city of Agadir in Morocco was badly damaged in a devastating earthquake, killing a third of the city's population. The French Navy's rescue response included the Goumier (originally USS PC-545) and her crew. On 14 October 1960 Goumier was loaned to the Royal Moroccan Navy and renamed as Agadir, becoming the first ship commissioned into the new navy. She was transferred back to French control in 1964 and became another ship in the class to end her career being sunk as a target.

Six PC-461s were transferred to the Portuguese Navy in 1948 under the MDAP; PC-811 as NRP Madeira, PC-812 as NRP Flores, PC-809 as NRP Sal, PC-1257 as NRP Santiago, PC-1256 as NRP São Tomé and PC-1259 as NRP São Vicente. Santiago was stationed in the Azores archipelago in the Atlantic as an air-sea rescue ship until 1957, when she commenced duty as a transport servicing the Madeira archipelago. The 1960s saw her engaged in combat support operations in Angola during the Angolan War of Independence. She was the first Portuguese PC-461 to be decommissioned, in 1967; the other five were decommissioned in the following two years.

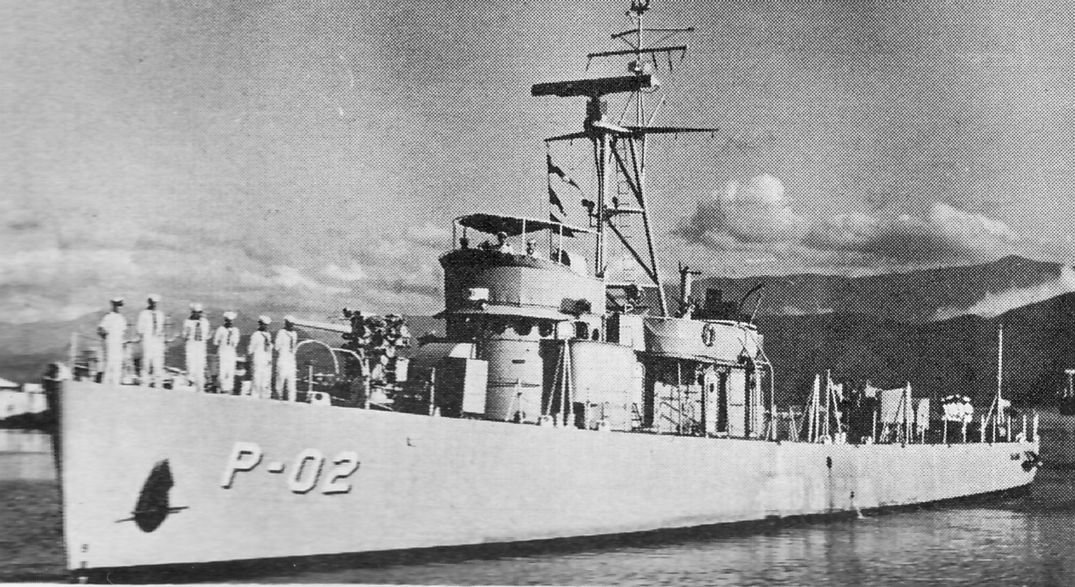
The Venezuelan Navy's Calamar (formerly the USS PC-566 and USS Honesdale) in 1964.

Five more were transferred to the Indonesian Navy in 1958 and 1960 under the MDAP; PC-787 as KRI Alu-Alu, PC-580 as KRI Hiu, PC-1183 as KRI Tenggiri, PC-1141 as KRI Tjakalang and PC-581 as KRI Torani.

Ten PC-461s went to Venezuela in 1962-3 and were commissioned into the Bolivarian Navy of Venezuela as the Mejillón class. The first was the former PC-487, commissioned as ARV Mejillón on 14 May 1962, twenty years after she was commissioned into the USN. The second (originally USS PC-566) was commissioned as ARV Calamar two months later, followed by three more ships — Alcatraz, Albatros and Petrel (originally PC-565, PC-582 and PC-1176 respectively) — commissioned on 20 August. A sixth vessel (originally PC-1077) was commissioned on 29 January 1963 as ARV Caracol and the remaining four — Pulpo (originally PC-465), Camarón (PC-483), Togogo (PC-484) and Gaviota (PC-619) — were commissioned on 15 October. Other ships were purchased for spare parts, but were not formally commissioned. All ten were decommissioned in the mid-1970s.

Another ship of the class that had a varied career was PC-790. After World War II she was decommissioned and taken over by the United States Maritime Commission in 1948. She was eventually transferred to the Cuban Coast Guard in mid-1956 and renamed Baire. After the Cuban Revolution, Baire was taken on by the Cuban Revolutionary Navy. On 17 April 1961 during the Bay of Pigs Invasion in southwestern Cuba, the now semi-derelict Baire was deployed as a picket off the Isle of Pines, some 150 kilometres (90 mi) west of the invasion site in the Bay of Pigs, when she was attacked by a pair of Douglas A-26 Invader aircraft flown by members of the American-backed Brigade 2506. Hit by rockets and machine gun fire and with several dead and wounded crewmembers, Baire was badly damaged. Her remaining crew managed to keep her afloat long enough for her to be towed to a port, where she sank dockside.

==== Nigerian flagship ====
PC-461-class losses post-World War II
Ship	Service	Date	Details	Location
USS PC-815	United States Navy	11 Sep. '45	Collided with the destroyer USS Laffey	Pacific Ocean off San Diego, California, USA
USS PC-584	United States Navy	9 Oct. '45	Typhoon Louise; grounded and abandoned	Nakagusuku Bay, Okinawa, Japan
USS PC-590	United States Navy	9 Oct. '45	Typhoon Louise; broke in two	Nakagusuku Bay, Okinawa, Japan
USS PCC-1126	United States Navy	9 Oct. '45	Typhoon Louise; grounded and abandoned	Nakagusuku Bay, Okinawa, Japan
USS PCC-1128	United States Navy	9 Oct. '45	Typhoon Louise; grounded and abandoned	Nakagusuku Bay, Okinawa, Japan
USS PC-1238	United States Navy	9 Oct. '45	Typhoon Louise; capsized	Nakagusuku Bay, Okinawa, Japan
USS PCC-1239	United States Navy	9 Oct. '45	Typhoon Louise; grounded and abandoned	Nakagusuku Bay, Okinawa, Japan
USS PC-814		10 Oct. '45	Typhoon Louise; sank	Off the coast of Okinawa, Japan
— (ex-USS PC-493)	Royal Thai Navy	May '47	Typhoon	Philippine waters
HTMS Khamronsin (orig. USS PC-609)	Royal Thai Navy	29-30 Jun. '51	Manhattan Rebellion; damaged by shellfire, not repaired	Chao Phraya River, Bangkok, Thailand
ROKS Jirisan (PC-704) (orig. USS PC-810)	Republic of Korea Navy	26 Dec. '51	Struck a mine during the Korean War	Wonsan harbor, North Korea
ROCS Lin Jiang (ex-USS PGM-13, orig. USS PC-609)	Republic of China Navy	10 Jan. '55	Surface action; torpedoed by People's Liberation Army Navy motor torpedo boats	Off Kinmen Island, China
ROCS Yin Jiang (ex-USS PGM-20, orig. USS PC-1551)	Republic of China Navy	20 Jan. '55	Surface action; torpedoed by People's Liberation Army Navy motor torpedo boats	Off Kinmen Island, China
ROCS Tuo Jiang (orig. USS PC-1247)	Republic of China Navy	2 Sep. '58	Surface action; damaged in action against People's Liberation Army Navy flotilla, not repaired	Off Kinmen Island, China
Baire (orig. USS PC-790)	Cuban Revolutionary Navy	17 Apr. '61	Attacked by aircraft during the Bay of Pigs Invasion	Isle of Pines, Cuba
ROKS Hanrasan (orig. USS PC-485)	Republic of Korea Navy	11 Nov. '62	Typhoon Karen; sunk	Apra Harbor, Guam
RPS Negros Oriental (orig. USS PC-1563)	Philippine Navy	11 Nov. '62	Typhoon Karen; sunk	Apra Harbor, Guam
ROCS Zhang Kiang (orig. USS PC-1232)	Republic of China Navy	6 Aug. '65	Surface action; gunfire from People's Liberation Army Navy fast patrol boats	Off Dongshan Island, China
NNS Ogoja (ex-HNMS Queen Wilhelmina, orig. USS PC-468)	Nigerian Navy	25 Oct. '69	Grounded while patrolling during the Nigerian Civil War and abandoned	Mouth of the Nun River, Nigeria
BRP Nueva Viscaya (ex-USS Altus, orig. USS PC-568)	Philippine Navy	12 Nov. '90	Typhoon Mike; struck by drifting ship	Port of Cebu, Cebu City, Philippines

The former PC-468, which had been transferred to the Netherlands in 1942 and renamed as HNLMS Queen Wilhelmina, went on to serve in the Nigerian Navy in the 1960s. Queen Wilhelmina was gifted to the Royal Nigerian Navy in 1963 to serve as an interim flagship, pending the construction in the Netherlands and commissioning of a frigate to serve as the first 'proper' flagship, the NNS Nigeria. HMNS Ogoja was commanded on its delivery voyage by the future Nigerian Admiral Nelson Bossman Soroh, arriving in Lagos on 27 September 1963. As NNS Ogoja following Nigeria's becoming a republic on 1 October 1963, she subsequently saw service in the Nigerian Civil War. Before the war even began, the Nigerian Navy imposed a blockade on Biafran territory. On 26 July 1967, Ogoja, under the command of Lieutenant Commander (later Vice Admiral) Akintunde Aduwo, was part of a fleet of nine Nigerian Navy ships and two merchant ships that landed troops at Bonny in the mouth of the Bonny River. During the operation Ogoja engaged the Biafran Navy's sole vessel, a former Royal Navy Ford-class seaward defence boat named the BNS Vigilance, previously the Nigerian Navy's Ibadan, which had been brought into the Biafran forces when her crew defected. During the one-sided action Vigilance's main gun, a 40mm Bofors, kept jamming after 3-4 rounds had been fired and as she maneuvered to avoid Ogoja's fire she ran aground close to shore. While stranded Vigilance was hit by shellfire from Ogoja's 3-inch gun, forcing the crew to abandon ship. During the battle for Bonny Ogoja also shelled Biafran targets on shore. During the Midwest Invasion of 1967 by Biafran forces, amid the fighting at Sapele, Ogoja's crew rescued the military governor of Mid-Western State, the future Army Chief of Staff David Ejoor. In a four-day operation in October 1967, Operation Tiger Claw, Ogoja led a small flotilla that landed troops at Calabar, where she again bombarded targets on land.

Ogoja led all of the Nigerian Navy's combat operations against Biafran forces, as the flagship frigate NNS Nigeria was too large to operate in the riverine environment of the Niger Delta and because it was thought that the loss of Nigeria in combat against Biafra would be too damaging to Nigerian prestige. These operations included the March 1968 Invasion of Port Harcourt that resulted in the capture of Oron and Port Harcourt by Nigerian federal forces, during which Ogoja was damaged by a Biafran remote-controlled mine on the last day of March; and the capture of Sapele and Warri as federal forces fought back against Biafra's Midwest Invasion, as well as the taking of Bonny and Calabar. After the riverine cities and towns were captured by federal forces and fighting moved further afield, Ogoja again saw duty enforcing the Nigerian Navy's blockade of Biafra. On 25 October 1969, Ogoja's naval career came to an end when she ran aground two miles off the lighthouse at the mouth of the Nun River at Akassa and was abandoned.

==== Last in service ====
The longest-serving ship in the class was USS PC-1138, which was laid down at Defoe Shipbuilding on 9 January 1943, launched on 19 April and commissioned on 17 September 1943. After serving in the Pacific, she was decommissioned at Astoria, Oregon on 13 September 1946 and laid up as part of the Columbia River Group in the Pacific Reserve Fleet. She was renamed USS Lapeer on 15 February 1956 then struck from the Naval Register on the first day of April 1959. She was sold to the Alaska Aggregate Corporation of Anchorage, Alaska, which had her undergo a radical transformation after an eighteen-year-long design effort by a naval architect. The forward 60 feet (18 m) was cut off the ship and dumped in Lake Union in Seattle. The 114-foot (35 m) long remainder, including engines, was then placed into another hull with a new spoon bow and the space between the two hulls was filled with reinforced concrete. After the modifications were complete, she displaced 950 tons, had a length of 134 feet 6 inches (41 m) and was 38 feet (12 m) wide. Renamed as the MV Knik Bay in 1967, she entered civilian service in Alaska, operating as an icebreaking transport vessel servicing oil rigs offshore. In the mid-1970s she was sold and converted as a tug, renamed Mister B. She was sold again to an oil company in Houston, Texas, which transferred her to Peru in 1977, where she again was used for oilfield support. The former PC-1138 re-entered military service when she was sold to the Peruvian Navy in 1984 and commissioned on 5 June 1985 as the BAP Dueñas. She served in the Peruvian Navy until she was decommissioned in 2015; she was eventually used as a target in the 2018 SIFOREX anti-submarine naval exercise and sunk.

=== Civilian use ===
After World War II many PC-461s were bought by civilian companies and scrapped. A small number were bought and modified for civilian operation, including by commercial fishing companies, marine survey companies and passenger lines; one was bought and converted as a luxury yacht.

At least three PC-461s were converted for service as civilian passenger ships. The former USS PC-579 (later USS Wapakoneta) was operated by the Greek shipping company Typaldos Lines in the 1960s as the Hydra; she was scrapped in 1971. After they were decommissioned and transferred to the United States Maritime Commission for disposal, USS PC-1207 and USS PC-1258 were bought by Wilson Lines of Boston, Massachusetts, which heavily modified them to serve as excursion ships, renamed MV Sea Belle and MV Boston Belle respectively. PC-1258 was the first to be modified. After her rework was completed in 1949, Boston Belle had a net register tonnage of 888 and was more than 75 feet (20 m) longer at 257 feet 6 inches (78.5 m), as well as more than twice as wide with a beam of 50 feet 7 inches (15.4 m); she was certified to carry 2,971 passengers. Sea Belle had the same dimensions as Boston Belle when she was completed in 1953, but came in at 1,693 net register tons and was certified to carry 2,422 passengers. Boston Belle was sold in Argentina in 1961 and was retired from service with Ferrylineas of Buenos Aires under the name MV Cuidad de Rosario in 1982, while Sea Belle was used as a floating restaurant near Norfolk, Virginia after her service with Wilson, until she was damaged in a fire in 1985; her hulk was abandoned near what is now Joint Expeditionary Base–Little Creek.

The former USS PC-1222 was bought from the United States Maritime Commission by Lucienne Benítez Rexach, the wife of Puerto Rican construction tycoon Félix Benítez Rexach, in 1947 and was converted into a luxury superyacht named MV Gosse.

More than thirty years after seeing extensive combat in the South West Pacific theatre of World War II between 1943 and the end of the war, the former USS PC-1120 was purchased by Greenpeace. Renamed from her previous identity (MV Island Transport) as MV Ohana Kai ("Children of the Sea"), in 1977 she was used to disrupt Soviet Union whaling operations in North Pacific waters between Hawaii and Alaska. She was eventually scrapped in 1991 after several years of use as a houseboat at Berkeley, California.

The former USS PC-1140 was sold in March 1961 and renamed MV Daniel L. Harris III. During the 1960s, the Navy Underwater Sound Laboratory conducted sonar experiments in Bahamaian waters. Daniel L. Harris III was the primary vessel used. By the early 1980s she was derelict in Miami.

== Appearances in media ==
- The USN allowed USS PC-1168 to be used to film the 1950 20th Century Fox movie U.S.S. Teakettle (later renamed You're in the Navy Now) starring Gary Cooper; and with Charles Bronson, Harvey Lembeck and Lee Marvin making their film debuts in minor roles. The movie's script was inspired by a magazine article written by a former officer who served on the experimental PC-452, that recounted her trials while fitted with steam turbine propulsion.
- The multi-player video game War Thunder features USS Carmi (originally PC-466) as one of the US vessels available for selection in its coastal fleet playing list. Also available are USS PGM-9 (commissioned as PC-466) and the experimental submarine chaser USS PC-451.

== See also ==
- USS PC-465
- USS PC-817
- USS PC-1179
- USS Pandemonium
- List of patrol vessels of the United States Navy
- List of Escorteurs of the French Navy
