= PGM-17 =

PGM-17 may refer to:

- PGM-17 Thor, the first operational ballistic missile in the US arsenal.
- USS PGM-17, a US Navy gunboat during World War 2.
