= USS PC-586 =

WWII-era American submarine chaser

History

United States
- Name: USS PC-586
- Builder: Defoe Shipbuilding Company, Bay City, Michigan
- Laid down: 29 May 1942
- Launched: 15 July 1942
- Commissioned: 5 October 1942
- Decommissioned: January 1950
- Renamed: Patchogue (PC-586), 15 February 1956
- Stricken: 1 April 1959
- Honors and awards: 1 battle star (World War II)
- Fate: Sold for scrapping, 1959

General characteristics
- Class & type: PC-461-class submarine chaser
- Displacement: 320 long tons (325 t)
- Length: 173 ft 7 in (52.91 m)
- Beam: 23 ft (7.0 m)
- Draft: 6 ft 6 in (1.98 m)
- Speed: 20 knots (37 km/h; 23 mph)
- Complement: 46
- Armament: 1 × 3 in (76 mm)/50 cal; 1 × 40 mm gun; 2 × 20 mm guns

USS PC-586 was a PC-461-class submarine chaser built for the United States Navy during World War II. She was later renamed Patchogue (PC-586), the second U.S. Navy ship of the name, but never saw active service under that name.

== Career ==
Patchogue was laid down on 29 May 1942 at the Defoe Shipbuilding Company in Bay City, Michigan; launched as USS PC-586 on 15 July 1942; and commissioned on 5 October 1942.

After sea trials in the Gulf of Mexico, PC-586 transited the Panama Canal and served as an escort craft along the west coast of the United States. Her coastal operations were ultimately extended to the Hawaiian Islands, and during the period of 1 August through 31 December 1943, she was assigned to Commander, Hawaiian Sea Frontier, for duty. During this time she rendered valuable service as a training craft in the area of Pearl Harbor. She likewise performed patrol and convoy escort missions in Hawaiian waters. A convoy escort mission took PC-586 to Saipan on 23 July 1944.

With the end of hostilities, the submarine chaser continued to bolster Fleet readiness by briefly serving in a training capacity out of Pearl Harbor, and then along the east coast at both Charleston, South Carolina and Coco Solo, Panama Canal Zone.

PC-586 decommissioned and went into reserve at Norfolk, Virginia in January 1950. She was named Patchogue on 15 February 1956, the second U.S. Navy ship of the name. She was struck from the Navy List on 1 April 1959, and shortly thereafter sold to Potomac Shipwrecking Company for scrapping.

== Awards ==
Patchogue received one battle star for World War II service.
