= USS Burke =

Buckley-class destroyer escort

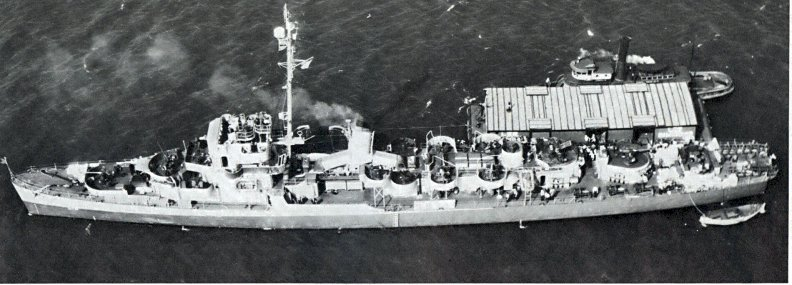
- USS Burke

History

United States
- Name: USS Burke
- Namesake: John E. Burke
- Ordered: 1942
- Builder: Philadelphia Navy Yard, Philadelphia
- Laid down: 1 January 1943
- Launched: 3 April 1943
- Commissioned: 20 July 1943
- Reclassified: APD-65, 24 January 1945
- Decommissioned: 22 June 1949
- Stricken: 1 June 1968
- Honors and awards: 1 battle star (World War II)
- Fate: Sold to Colombia, 12 August 1968

History

Colombia
- Name: ARC Almirante Brión (DT-07)
- Namesake: Luis Brión
- Acquired: 12 August 1968
- Stricken: 1974
- Fate: Scrapped, 1974

General characteristics
- Class & type: Buckley-class destroyer escort
- Displacement: 1,400 long tons (1,422 t) standard; 1,740 long tons (1,768 t) full load
- Length: 306 ft (93 m)
- Beam: 37 ft (11 m)
- Draft: 9 ft 6 in (2.90 m) standard; 11 ft 3 in (3.43 m) full load
- Propulsion: 2 × boilers; General Electric turbo-electric drive; 12,000 shp (8.9 MW); 2 × solid manganese-bronze 3,600 lb (1,600 kg) 3-bladed propellers, 8 ft 6 in (2.59 m) diameter, 7 ft 7 in (2.31 m) pitch; 2 × rudders; 359 tons fuel oil
- Speed: 23 knots (43 km/h; 26 mph)
- Range: 3,700 nmi (6,900 km) at 15 kn (28 km/h; 17 mph); 6,000 nmi (11,000 km) at 12 kn (22 km/h; 14 mph)
- Complement: 15 officers, 198 men
- Armament: 3 × 3-inch/50-caliber guns; 1 × quad 1.1-inch/75-caliber gun; 8 × single 20 mm guns; 1 × triple 21 inch (533 mm) torpedo tubes; 1 × Hedgehog anti-submarine mortar; 8 × K-gun depth charge projectors; 2 × depth charge tracks

USS Burke (DE-215/APD-65), a Buckley-class destroyer escort of the United States Navy, was named in honor of Lieutenant Commander John E. Burke (1905–1942), who was killed in action, aboard the battleship South Dakota during the Naval Battle of Guadalcanal on 15 November 1942.

Burke was laid down on 1 January 1943 by the Philadelphia Navy Yard; launched on 4 April 1943; sponsored by Mrs. Miriam Katherine Burke, the widow of Lt. Comdr. Burke; and commissioned on 20 August 1943.

== Service history ==
=== Atlantic convoys, 1943–1944 ===
Following shakedown off Bermuda, the destroyer escort participated in general type training in late September and October. On 29 October, she joined a convoy bound for Ireland and arrived safely at Derry on 11 November. Burke soon returned to New York and made eight more uneventful round-trip transatlantic voyages to escort convoys to Europe or North Africa and back.

=== Pacific Fleet, 1945 ===
On 25 January 1945, the warship entered Sullivan Drydock and Repair Corporation in Brooklyn, New York, for conversion to a Charles Lawrence-class high speed transport. Redesignated APD-65, Burke left the shipyard on 8 April and was slated for service in the war against Japan.

Burke transited the Panama Canal and joined the Pacific Fleet on 1 May at Balboa. There, she also embarked officers and sailors for transportation to San Diego and, after reaching southern California, took on board more passengers for passage to Pearl Harbor. The high-speed transport's mission was to carry Underwater Demolition Teams (UDT's) to assault areas for prelanding beach clearance. Burke trained with UDT's on Maui in preparation for service in the conquest of Okinawa.

The fast transport arrived off Okinawa on 27 June after the major part of the struggle to take that island was over. She briefly served on picket duty off Ie Shima, but Burke's duty was cut short on 30 June, and she sailed for the Philippines. The high-speed transport trained near Legaspi on southeastern Luzon with other amphibious ships in preparation for the expected invasion of the Japanese home islands. However, the explosion of atomic bombs at Hiroshima and Nagasaki early in August demonstrated to Japan the futility of continuing the war, so Burke never had an opportunity to participate in an assault. She returned to Leyte and was there when the Japanese capitulated on 15 August.

Burke escorted occupation forces to Japan and, as the formal surrender ceremony took place on board the battleship Missouri in Tokyo Bay on 2 September, the transport steamed up the channel and into the bay. Burke escorted convoys of occupation troops until 26 October then proceeded to Manila. After transporting men and equipment among the islands of the Philippine archipelago, Burke embarked returning veterans and headed for home. Upon arrival at San Diego, the fast transport disembarked her passengers and got underway for the east coast of the United States.

=== Atlantic Fleet, 1946–1949 ===
In January 1946, Burke became the flagship for Transport Division 121 and commenced operations with the Atlantic Fleet. She participated in fleet anti-submarine and amphibious exercises along the east coast and in the West Indies. She also trained UDT's and naval reservists. On 16 April 1949, Burke reported to the Charleston Naval Shipyard for inactivation.

=== Decommissioning and transfer ===
She was placed out of commission, in reserve, on 23 June 1949 and was towed to Green Cove Springs, Florida, to be berthed with the Atlantic Reserve Fleet. Late in 1967, Burke was selected for sale under the Military Assistance Program to the Republic of Colombia. Her name was struck from the United States Navy List on 1 June 1968, and she was transferred to the Colombian Navy on 8 December. She was commissioned as ARC Almirante Brión (DT-07) and served until disposed of in 1974.

== Awards ==
Burke earned one battle star for her World War II service.
