= USS PC-1179 =

History

United States
- Name: USS PC-1179
- Builder: Leathem D. Smith Shipbuilding Company, Sturgeon Bay, Wisconsin
- Laid down: 20 September 1943
- Launched: 6 November 1943
- Commissioned: 22 January 1944
- Decommissioned: 13 May 1946
- Renamed: USS Morris (PC-1179), 15 February 1956
- Stricken: 1 July 1960
- Fate: Sold, 10 May 1961; scrapped

General characteristics
- Class & type: PC-461-class submarine chaser
- Length: 173 ft 8 in (52.93 m)
- Beam: 23 ft (7.0 m)
- Draft: 10 ft 10 in (3.30 m)
- Propulsion: 2 x 2,880bhp Fairbanks-Morse diesel engines (Serial No. 833299 and 833300), Westinghouse single reduction gear, two shafts.
- Speed: 20.2 kn (37.4 km/h; 23.2 mph)
- Armament: 1 × 3 in (76 mm)/50 cal; 1 × 40 mm gun; 3 × 20 mm cannons; 2 × rocket launchers; 4 × depth charge throwers; 2 × depth charge tracks

USS PC-1179 was a PC-461-class submarine chaser built for the United States Navy during World War II. She was later renamed Morris (PC-1179) but never saw active service under that name.

== Career ==
PC-1179 was commissioned in 1944 and decommissioned in 1946, she was renamed as the eighth USS Morris in 1956.

She was struck from the navy register on 1 July 1960 and sold on 10 May 1961, to Zidell Shipbreakers in Portland, Oregon for $17,038.88.
