= USS PC-465 =

History

United States
- Name: PC-465
- Namesake: Paragould, Arkansas
- Builder: George Lawley & Son, Neponset, Massachusetts
- Laid down: 19 August 1941
- Launched: 28 March 1942
- Commissioned: 25 May 1942
- Decommissioned: 1946
- Renamed: Paragould, 15 January 1956
- Stricken: 1 July 1960
- Fate: Transferred to Venezuela, April 1961

History

Venezuela
- Name: Pulpo
- Acquired: April 1961
- Decommissioned: 1968
- Stricken: 1978
- Fate: Unknown

General characteristics
- Class & type: PC-461-class submarine chaser
- Displacement: 300 long tons (305 t)
- Length: 174 ft 9 in (53.26 m)
- Beam: 23 ft (7.0 m)
- Draft: 7 ft 6 in (2.29 m)
- Speed: 20 knots (37 km/h; 23 mph)
- Complement: 80 officers and enlisted
- Armament: 2 × 3 in (76 mm) guns; 2 × 20 mm guns; 2 × Depth charge projectors; 2 × Depth charge tracks

USS PC-465 was a PC-461-class submarine chaser built for the United States Navy during World War II. She was later renamed Paragould (PC-465) but never saw active service under that name. In 1961 she was transferred to the Venezuelan Navy under the name ARV Pulpo (P-7). She remained active in Venezuelan service until 1968, when she was placed in reserve. She was stricken in 1978 but her ultimate fate is unknown.

== Career ==
PC-465 was laid down on 19 August 1941 by George Lawley & Son Corp. at Neponset, Massachusetts, launched on 28 March 1942, sponsored by Miss Edna Tamm, and commissioned at Boston on 25 May, as USS PC-465. On her maiden voyage from Boston to Norfolk, Virginia, PC-465 served as an anti-submarine convoy escort. Thence from Norfolk she provided escort service for a second convoy, this time to Guantanamo Bay, Cuba.

In August PC-465 commenced patrol and escort operations between Coco Solo, Panama and Guantanamo Bay. She also called at several Central and South American ports. After a short overhaul at Key West, Florida in June 1943, she resumed convoy escort duties in the Caribbean.

PC-465 underwent a major overhaul at Key West during the summer of 1944 preparatory to transit to Pearl Harbor. She reported on 6 December to Commander, Hawaiian Sea Frontier, and immediately commenced inter-island convoy escort duty and patrol. In January and February 1945 she escorted a convoy as far as Canton Island, touching at Palmyra, Fanning, and Christmas Islands in the process. She was next assigned operations out of Enewetak, and from May through August she performed as a convoy escort, patrol, and hunter-killer craft. PC-465 transferred to Kwajalein on 19 August, but served there only briefly before returning to the United States.

PC-465 was placed out of commission, in reserve and berthed at Green Cove Springs, Florida in 1946. Named Paragould (PC-465) on 15 January 1956, she was struck from the Naval Vessel Register on 1 July 1960. Paragould was transferred to Venezuela in April 1961 and renamed Pulpo (P-7). Placed in reserve in 1968, she was deleted from Venezuelan Navy List in 1978. Fate unknown.
