= USS PC-1140 =

History

United States
- Name: USS PC-1140
- Namesake: towns in Iowa and Minnesota
- Builder: Defoe Shipbuilding Company
- Laid down: 8 February 1943
- Launched: 14 June 1943
- Commissioned: 22 January 1944
- Decommissioned: January 1947
- Renamed: USS Glenwood (PC-1140), 15 February 1956
- Stricken: 1 July 1960
- Fate: Sold, March 1961

General characteristics
- Class & type: PC-461-class submarine chaser
- Displacement: 280 tons (light) 450 tons (full)
- Length: 173 ft 8 in (52.93 m)
- Beam: 23 ft (7.0 m)
- Draft: 10 ft 10 in (3.30 m)
- Propulsion: 2 General Motors 16-278A diesel engines, 2 x shafts
- Speed: 22 knots
- Complement: 65
- Armament: 1 × 3 in (76 mm)/50 cal; 1 × 40 mm gun; 3 × 20 mm cannons; 2 x Hedgehog rocket launchers; 4 × depth charge throwers; 2 × depth charge tracks

USS PC-1140 was a PC-461-class submarine chaser built for the United States Navy during World War II. She was later renamed Glenwood (PC-1140) but never saw active service under that name.

== Career ==
PC-1140 was laid down on 8 February 1943 at Defoe Shipbuilding Company in Bay City, Michigan. She was launched on 14 June, and was commissioned on 22 January 1944.

After initial shakedown in Miami, Florida, PC-1140 escorted convoy runs in the Gulf of Mexico and Caribbean until early June 1944, when she was sent for an overhaul in Norfolk, Virginia. In July she sailed for the Mediterranean, arriving in Bizerte, Tunisia on the 28th. She was assigned to patrol duties along the coast of Italy until 14 August when she was assigned to escort a convoy en route to the invasion of Southern France. She patrolled the assault area and ran convoy escort duty during the assault, returning to Naples, Italy on 17 August.

For the remainder of World War II, she operated on patrol and escort duty between the Italian and French coasts. After VE Day, PC-1140 returned to the United States, arriving in Key West, Florida on 14 June 1945. She was scheduled for Pacific operations; however the war came to a conclusion before her deployment. Instead she served in training exercises off the coast of Florida until 6 November 1946 when she returned to Norfolk. PC-1140 was decommissioned in January 1947 and joined the Atlantic Reserve Fleet. While berthed at Green Cove Springs, Florida, she was given the name Glenwood, after the cities in Mills County, Iowa and Pope County, Minnesota on 15 February 1956. Her name was struck from the Naval Vessel Register on 1 July 1960 and she was disposed of by Navy sale in March 1961.

PC-1140 received one battle star for World War II service.
