= USS PC-817 =

History

United States
- Name: USS PC-817
- Builder: Albina Engine & Machinery Works, Portland, Oregon
- Laid down: 8 January 1943
- Launched: 4 March 1943
- Commissioned: 13 July 1943
- Decommissioned: 22 July 1946
- In service: 22 July 1946
- Out of service: December 1949
- Renamed: USS Welch (PC-817), 15 February 1956
- Stricken: 1 April 1959
- Fate: fate unknown

General characteristics
- Class & type: PC-461-class submarine chaser
- Displacement: 280 tons
- Length: 173 ft 8 in (52.93 m)
- Beam: 23 ft 0 in (7.01 m)
- Draft: 10 ft 10 in (3.30 m)
- Speed: 20.2 knots
- Complement: 65
- Armament: 1 × 3 in (76 mm)/50 cal; 1 × 40 mm gun; 2 × depth charge throwers; 2 × depth charge tracks

USS PC-817 was a PC-461-class submarine chaser built for the United States Navy during World War II. She was later renamed Welch (PC-817) but never saw active service under that name.

== Career ==
PC-817 was laid down at Portland, Oregon, by the Albina Engine & Machinery Works on 8 January 1943; launched on 4 March 1943; sponsored by Mrs. H. O. McAlpine; and commissioned on 13 July 1943.

PC-817 completed fitting out at Portland until 6 August when she shifted south to San Pedro, California. After shakedown training out of San Pedro between 18 August and 30 September, the patrol craft was assigned to the Western Sea Frontier. She served along the California coast—escorting coastwise convoys and conducting antisubmarine patrols—until 1 December when she arrived at the Naval Station, Seattle, Washington, for repairs incident to her imminent transfer to the Alaska Sea Frontier. On the 16th, she departed Seattle and arrived at Ketchikan four days later.

For the next 11 months, PC-817 steamed between the sundry American bases along the Aleutians chain, escorting supply convoys, transporting passengers and mail, and conducting surveys. On 5 November 1944, the patrol vessel departed Shemya to escort SS Griffco to Seattle, Washington. After stops at Adak, Dutch Harbor, and Ketchikan, she arrived in Seattle on 29 November.

At the Puget Sound Navy Yard, she began a major overhaul that lasted until April 1945. On 18 April, the patrol vessel took leave of Puget Sound and headed—via San Francisco, California—to her last wartime assignment—the Hawaiian Islands. She reached Pearl Harbor on 1 May and conducted patrols among and escorted ships between the islands through the end of the war.

On 11 September, she headed back to the U.S. West Coast, arriving in San Pedro, California, on the 20th. From there, she steamed to the Panama Canal and thence proceeded via Key West, Florida, to Jacksonville, Florida, where she arrived on 28 November.

PC-817 was to have undergone inactivation overhaul at Jacksonville and then was to have been decommissioned and berthed with the Florida Group, Atlantic Reserve Fleet. However, her inactivation was never completed. She remained at Jacksonville until April 1946 when she moved north to Charleston, South Carolina, for disposal by the Commandant, 6th Naval District. However, while at Charleston, she received a reprieve by way of assignment as U.S. Naval Reserve training ship for the 9th Naval District. On 4 June, she headed north from Charleston. After a visit to New York City and port calls at American and Canadian ports along the St. Lawrence waterway, she arrived at Toledo, Ohio, on 11 July. Though placed out of commission on 22 July, PC-817 remained active—in an "in service" capacity—as a Naval Reserve training ship for the 9th Naval District.

After over three years of service training naval reservists on the Great Lakes, PC-817 began her last voyage on 14 November 1949. From Chicago, Illinois, she steamed down the Des Plaines and Illinois River system to the Mississippi River just above St. Louis, Missouri, and thence moved south to New Orleans, Louisiana, where she arrived on 29 November. A week later, she continued her voyage—via Pensacola, St. Petersburg and Key West, Florida—and arrived in Philadelphia, Pennsylvania, on 19 December.

On the 21st, she began inactivation overhaul at the Philadelphia Naval Shipyard. In March 1950, she was shifted south to Norfolk, Virginia, and was berthed with the Norfolk Group, Atlantic Reserve Fleet. She remained there for the next nine years; and, during that time, she received a name. On 15 February 1956, PC-817 became USS Welch (PC-817). On 1 April 1959, her name was struck from the Navy list. She was probably sold for scrapping soon thereafter.
