= USS PC-1136 =

History

United States
- Name: USS PC-1136
- Builder: Defoe Shipbuilding Company, Bay City, Michigan
- Laid down: 17 December 1942
- Launched: 5 March 1943
- Commissioned: 16 November 1943
- Renamed: PCC-1136, 27 October 1945
- Decommissioned: 28 July 1946
- Renamed: PC-1136, 27 October 1955
- Renamed: USS Galena (PC-1136), 15 February 1956
- Namesake: cities in Alaska, Kansas, Illinois, Maryland, Missouri, and Ohio
- Honors and awards: 1 battle star (World War II)
- Fate: Sold, 11 March 1960; scrapped

General characteristics
- Class & type: PC-461-class submarine chaser
- Displacement: 280 long tons (284 t)
- Length: 173 ft 8 in (52.93 m)
- Beam: 23 ft (7.0 m)
- Draft: 10 ft 10 in (3.30 m)
- Propulsion: 2 × 2,880 bhp (2,148 kW) General Motors 16-258S diesel engines; Farrel-Birmingham single reduction gear; 2 shafts
- Speed: 20 knots (37 km/h; 23 mph)
- Complement: 65
- Armament: 1 × 3"/50 caliber guns; 1 × single 40 mm gun; 3 × 20 mm guns; 2 × Rocket launchers; 4 × Depth charge projectors; 2 × Depth charge tracks

USS PC-1136 was a PC-461-class submarine chaser built for the United States Navy during World War II. Shortly after the end of the war, she was renamed USS PCC-1136 when she was reclassified as a combat communications control ship. In 1956, she was renamed Galena (PC-1136), becoming the third U.S. Navy vessel so named, but never saw active service under that name.

== Career ==
PC-1136 was laid down at the Defoe Shipbuilding Company, in Bay City, Michigan on 17 December 1942, launched on 5 March 1943, and commissioned at New Orleans, Louisiana on 16 November 1943.

After shakedown, PC-1136 operated out of Miami, and Key West, Florida, while receiving anti-submarine warfare training. Departing from Key West on 1 January 1944, she steamed via the Panama Canal and the Society and Tonga Islands to arrive at Nouméa, New Caledonia, on 12 March for duty as patrol and escort ship. From 27 March to 1 April, she escorted merchant ships to Guadalcanal and then sailed the following day to Efate as escort for the ammunition ship Shasta (AE-6). Arriving on 4 April, she steamed next day to Espiritu Santo to escort a merchant tanker to Guadalcanal.

PC-1136 reached Guadalcanal on 8 April, and for almost two months she continued intermittent convoy escort and ASW patrol duties out of the Solomons to New Caledonia and the New Hebrides. Departing in convoy on 31 May, she arrived at Kwajalein, Marshall Islands on 6 June to prepare for the invasion of Guam. Assigned to Task Group 58.1, she sailed on 9 June, arriving east of the Marianas on 22 June. After patrolling east of Saipan, she returned to Kwajalein on 5 July. Between 15 and 21 July she steamed to Guam, where she served as amphibious control ship during the landings. After screening offshore transports during the next week, she departed for the Marshalls on 28 July and arrived at Eniwetok on 3 August. Between 5 and 13 August, she sailed to Saipan as a convoy escort. For almost seven months she operated between the Marshals and the Marianas, escorting merchant ships and searching for enemy submarines. She departed Guam on 3 March 1945, touched at Eniwetok and arrived at Pearl Harbor on 18 March.

After overhaul and conversion to a control ship, PC-1136 sailed for the Western Pacific on 21 May. Escorting a convoy of LSTs, she reached Guam on 9 June and resumed convoy escort duties in the Marianas. She departed Guam on 6 August, touched at Ulithi and arrived at Subic Bay, Philippines on 15 August.

She was reclassified to PCC-1136 (Control submarine chaser) five days later. After steaming to Lingayen Gulf on 10 September, she escorted a convoy of LSTs to Japan, arriving at Wakayama on 19 September. Between 24 and 30 September she returned to Lingayen Gulf and during the first two days of October, she sailed to Manila.

PCC-1136 departed Manila for the Marianas on 17 October and arrived at Guam on the 22nd. On 1 November, executive officer Lt. Elden L. Beebe was reassigned as captain. For more than six months, she operated out of Guam, steaming to Saipan, Rota, Marianas, and Ulithi. She sailed for the United States on 1 May 1946 via Eniwetok and Pearl Harbor, arriving at Astoria, Oregon, on 29 May.

PCC-1136 decommissioned on 28 July 1946 and entered the Pacific Reserve Fleet. While berthed in the Columbia River, she was reclassified back to PC-1136 (Submarine chaser) on 27 October 1955. The ship was named Galena (PC-1136) on 15 February 1956, after cities in Alaska, Kansas, Illinois, Maryland, Missouri, and Ohio; all of those which were named for a native lead sulfide, the chief ore of lead. She was sold by the Navy on 11 March 1960 to Miami Ports Company and subsequently scrapped.

== Awards ==
PC-1136 received one battle star for World War II service.
