= USS PC-1119 =

History

United States
- Name: USS PC-1119
- Builder: Defoe Shipbuilding Company, Bay City, Michigan
- Laid down: 12 June 1942
- Launched: 11 August 1942
- Commissioned: 15 December 1942
- Decommissioned: 9 January 1947
- Renamed: Greencastle, 15 February 1956
- Namesake: cities in Indiana and Pennsylvania
- Honors and awards: 5 battle stars (World War II)
- Fate: Sold for scrap, 1 July 1958

General characteristics
- Class & type: PC-461-class submarine chaser
- Displacement: 280 long tons (284 t)
- Length: 173 ft 8 in (52.93 m)
- Beam: 23 ft (7.0 m)
- Draft: 10 ft 10 in (3.30 m)
- Speed: 22 knots (41 km/h; 25 mph)
- Complement: 65
- Armament: 2 × single 3"/50 caliber guns; 5 × single 20 mm guns; 2 × Mousetrap anti-submarine rockets; 2 × Depth charge projectors; 2 × Depth charge tracks

USS PC-1119 was a PC-461-class submarine chaser built for the United States Navy during World War II. She was later renamed Greencastle (PC-1119), after Greencastle, Indiana and Greencastle, Pennsylvania, but never saw active service under that name.

== Career ==
PC-1119 was laid down at Defoe Shipbuilding Company, in Bay City, Michigan, on 12 June 1942; launched on 11 August 1942; and commissioned at New Orleans, Louisiana, on 15 December 1942. After shakedown off Key West, Florida, she sailed on 19 January 1943 for the Southwest Pacific. Steaming via New Caledonia, she reached Brisbane, Australia, on 12 March, and was assigned duty as flagship of the Allied Local Defense Forces, Northwest Australia. During the next six months she operated out of Brisbane, Townsville, and Cairns, escorting convoys between Australia and New Guinea. During June and July, she helped repel enemy planes that attacked Allied shipping at Port Moresby.

PC-1119 transferred her base to Milne Bay, New Guinea, in September, and from there she escorted convoys moving men and supplies along the coast of Huon Gulf. On 2 October she supported amphibious landings at Finschhafen, which was to become the jumping off point for the invasion of New Britain. Transferred to the 7th Amphibious Force on 6 December, she supported the initial invasion during landings at Arawe, New Britain, on 17 December. Nine days later, she supported landings by the 1st Marine Division at Cape Gloucester; then, after steaming along the northern coast of New Guinea, she participated in the assault against Saidor on 2 January 1944, assisting in the landing of troops of the 32nd Infantry Division.

During the next three months PC-1119 escorted convoys along the New Guinea coast to the Admiralties and New Britain. She supported an amphibious landing at Talasea, New Britain, on 7 March. Driving westward along New Guinea, she joined the assault at Aitape on 22 April; and as an escort and patrol ship, she supported landings on 3 July at Noemfoor, Schouten Islands. During this invasion she patrolled on anti-shipping sweeps as the Japanese attempted to send reinforcements by barge. After steaming to Australia in August, she returned to Aitape on 3 September to prepare for operations in the Moluccas. Between 15 September and 24 September she steamed off Morotai, where she controlled landing craft and provided anti-aircraft cover for supply transports. Departing on 24 September, she sailed via Biak to Humboldt Bay where she arrived on the 28th.

=== Philippine service ===
PC-1119 departed on 9 October for the invasion of the Philippines. Steaming via Manus, Admiralties, she closed the coast of Leyte on 20 October. After laying down shoal buoys at the northern end of Leyte Gulf, she served as landing control ship during the assault against Tacloban airfield. She remained off Leyte; and between 23 October and 25 October she helped repel heavy enemy air attacks, during which she splashed three Japanese raiders. Late on the 25th she sailed to search for survivors from ships lost during the Battle off Samar. During mid-watch on 27 October, she rescued 183 men from the escort carrier Gambier Bay (CVE-73), then returned the same day to Leyte Gulf. Resuming duty as control and fire cover ship, she served in Leyte Gulf until 9 November when she sailed for New Guinea, reaching Hollandia on 16 November.

After repairs, she steamed to Sansapor, New Guinea, on 12 December to prepare for the invasion of Luzon. Departing in convoy on 30 December, she reached Lingayen Gulf on 9 January 1945, and there served as control ship for the landings at San Fabian Beach. The Japanese launched heavy air attacks against American shipping: and, while PC-1119 was returning to Leyte as a convoy escort, she was narrowly missed by suicide planes on 12 January and 13 January.

She returned to Luzon on 29 January, and after supporting landings at San Felipe and San Narciso by troops of the 8th U.S. Army, she arrived at Subic Bay on 3 February. On 15 February, she escorted landing craft from Subic Bay for landings at Mariveles, Bataan. The following day she served as fire support ship during the assault against Corregidor.

During the assault, PC-1119 shelled targets on the shore and was damaged by an enemy shell. She was still able to embark casualties from LCMs and evacuate them while under fire to an offshore LST.

PC-1119 operated off western Luzon and Mindoro on anti-shipping sweeps until 11 March when she sailed for Leyte, arriving there on 14 March. From 19 March to 24 March she steamed via the Palaus to Hollandia. After repairing battle damage, she departed on 30 June and returned to Subic Bay on 8 July. During the next month she searched for enemy submarines off Luzon between Subic and San Fernando. Assigned to the Philippine Sea Frontier on 14 August, after the end of hostilities she patrolled the South China Sea to accept the surrender of Japanese submarines.

=== Postwar ===
PC-1119 remained in the Philippines after the end of the war. Assigned to the 16th Fleet on 19 March 1946, she returned to the United States and reported for duty on 10 August.

She was decommissioned on 9 January 1947 at Green Cove Springs, Florida, and entered the Atlantic Reserve Fleet. While berthed at Green Cove Springs, she was named Greencastle (PC-1119) on 15 February 1956 in honor of Greencastle, Indiana and Greencastle, Pennsylvania. She was sold to Boston Metals Company, of Baltimore, Maryland, for scrapping on 1 July 1958.

== Awards ==
Greencastle received five battle stars for World War II service.
