= USS PC-470 =

US World War II submarine chaser

History

United States
- Name: USS PC-470
- Builder: George Lawley & Sons; Neponset, Massachusetts
- Laid down: 27 February 1942
- Launched: 27 June 1942
- Commissioned: 31 July 1942
- Decommissioned: March 1946, Portland, Oregon
- Renamed: USS Antigo (PC-470), 15 January 1956
- Stricken: 1 July 1960
- Fate: unknown

General characteristics
- Class & type: PC-461-class submarine chaser
- Length: 173 ft (53 m)

USS PC-470 was a PC-461-class submarine chaser built for the United States Navy during World War II. She was later renamed Antigo (PC-470) but never saw active service under that name.

== Career ==
PC-470 was laid down by George Lawley & Sons of Neponset, Massachusetts, on 27 February 1942, and launched on 27 June. She was commissioned on 31 July.

While in the Philippines during World War II, the ship was holed by a Japanese 75-millimeter (3.0 in) shell at Leyte, but was repaired. PC-470 earned two battle stars for her World War II service.

PC-470 was decommissioned in March 1946 at Portland, Oregon, and laid up in the Pacific Reserve Fleet in the Columbia River. On 15 January 1956, while in reserve, the ship was renamed Antigo (PC-470), but never saw any active service under that name. Antigo was struck from the Naval Vessel Register on 1 July 1960. Her ultimate fate is not recorded in secondary sources.
