= USS PC-472 =

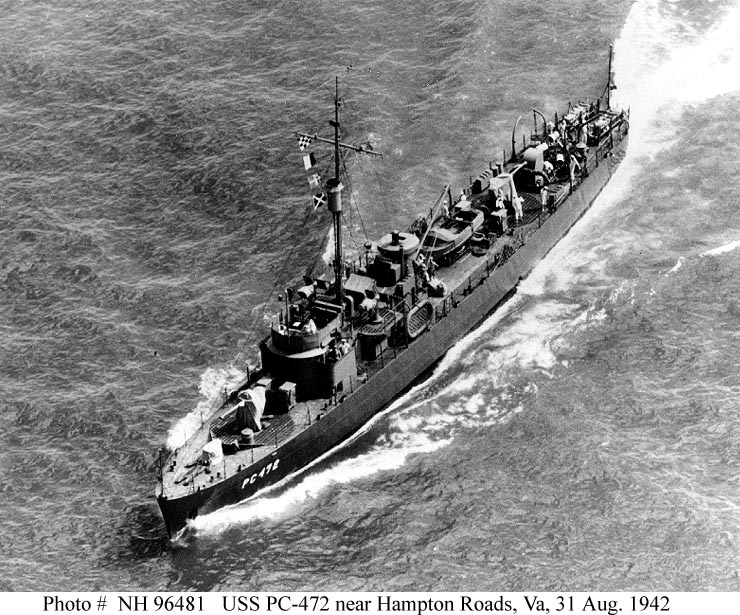

History

United States
- Name: USS PC-472
- Builder: Defoe Shipbuilding Company, Bay City, Michigan
- Laid down: 1 July 1941
- Launched: 14 November 1941
- Commissioned: 9 December 1941
- Decommissioned: 30 June 1944
- Fate: Transferred to French Navy, 30 June 1944
- Stricken: c. March 1949

History

France
- Name: Le Ruse
- Acquired: 30 June 1944
- Decommissioned: c. 1959

General characteristics
- Class & type: PC-461-class submarine chaser
- Length: 173 ft (53 m)

USS PC-472 was a PC-461-class submarine chaser built for the United States Navy during World War II. She was transferred to the French Navy in June 1944 and renamed Le Ruse. She remained in French service until 1959.

== Career ==
PC-472 was laid down at Defoe Shipbuilding Company in Bay City, Michigan, on 1 July 1941; launched on 14 November; and was commissioned on 9 December 1941.

The ship was loaned to the French under Lend-Lease on 30 June 1944 and was sold to them in March 1949. She remained in their service as Le Ruse until 1959.

== See also ==
- List of Escorteurs of the French Navy
