= Sullivan Drydock and Repair Corporation =

Coordinates: 40°39′49″N 74°00′00″W

- Industry: Shipbuilding and repair
- Headquarters: Brooklyn, New York

Sullivan Drydock and Repair Corporation was a shipyard located in Brooklyn, New York. It was located off 23rd Street in Greenwood Heights/Sunset Park, in the Tebo Basin. Sullivan built submarine chasers (PC boats) and altered, repaired, and converted ships for various branches of the US military during World War II.

== Origins ==
As of October 1, 1937 Fred B. Sullivan, president, leased Tebo Yacht basin from the Todd Corporation and began operating there as the Sullivan Drydock and Repair Corporation. The Sullivan Company originated in 1871 with the Sullivan-Boyd Machine shop, which became the John W. Sullivan Company, which designed and built marine steam engines for tug boats and steamers. Six months prior to the lease of Tebo basin, Sullivan operated a shipyard at Erie Basin. Sullivan's head, millionaire Fred B. Sullivan, committed suicide 30 August 1938. At that time, Sullivan Drydock and Repair was described as "one of the oldest firms on the South Brooklyn waterfront."

John W. Sullivan was also active in the nearby Bethlehem Steel Elisabethport yard between 1914 and 1930.

The Sullivan Drydock and Repair Corporation began building ships in the Tebo Yacht Basin in the buildup before World War II. Tebo Yacht Basin was used to build minesweepers during World War I. In March 1941, Sullivan reportedly had $4 million in defense contracts. The keel being laid for USS PC-488 was the first new construction in the basin since 1930. Sullivan's first defense job was to convert the 333-foot yacht Orion to USS Vixen (PG-53). It was said to be the world's largest yacht and had been owned by the recently deceased millionaire Julius Forstmann (1871–1939).

At Tebo Basin, Sullivan had three ways to launch ships backwards and another three for sideways launches. Sullivan also had four floating dry docks and five piers for repairs. Prior to moving to Tebo Basin, Sullivan operated in Manhattan, but had to move due to East River Drive. About 800 men on two shifts were working 48 hours a week in March 1941.

== Fraud issues ==
Five shipyard officers were indicted on charges of fraud in July 1943. Attorney General Francis Biddle did not give an exact amount for the fraud, but said it was more than $100,000. On 6 August 1943, five Sullivan officials were sentenced after pleading guilty to conspiracy and fraud charges in July. Sentences ranged from 9 months to 2 years imprisonment and fines between $1,000 and $5,000. According to their defense attorney, restitution between $75,000 and $100,000 had already been made. Sullivan Drydock was also fined $5,000.

== Supreme Court decision ==
Sullivan was the defendant in a 1946 United States Supreme Court case, Fishgold v. Sullivan Drydock, which first articulated an "escalator principle", which held that drafted service members returning to work would receive seniority and benefits as though their service at the company was uninterrupted. In 1994, the Uniformed Services Employment and Reemployment Rights Act eventually codified that principle into law, but in 1946, Fishgold lost the appeal and was not entitled to seniority, but the right of reemployment under the Selective Training and Service Act of 1940 was affirmed.

== List of ships built or converted ==
A list of some of the ships built by Sullivan Drydock:

- USS Vixen (PG-53), converted from yacht Orion for $1.25 million
- 16 of 343 PC-461-class submarine chasers
  - USS PC-488
  - USS PC-489
  - USS PC-552
  - USS PC-553
  - USS PC-554
  - USS PC-555
  - USS PC-1167
  - USS PC-1168
  - USS PC-1169
  - USS PC-1170
  - USS PC-1231
  - USS PC-1232
  - USS PC-1233
  - USS PC-1234
  - USS PC-1235
  - USS PC-1236
- Charles Lawrence (DE-53) to APD-37
- Blessman (DE-69) to APD-48
- Hubbard (DE-211) to APD-53
- Burke (DE-215) to APD-65

== See also ==
- Tebo Yacht Basin F.C., a football club for Tebo Yacht Basin circa 1918-1921
