= USS PC-1142 =

History

United States
- Name: USS PC-1142
- Builder: Defoe Shipbuilding Company
- Laid down: 31 March 1943
- Launched: 20 August 1943
- Commissioned: 3 June 1944
- Decommissioned: October 1946
- Renamed: USS Hanford (PC-1142), 15 February 1956
- Namesake: Hanford, California
- Fate: Transferred to Republic of China, July 1957
- Stricken: 15 April 1976

History

Taiwan
- Name: ROCS Pei Chang (PC-122)
- Acquired: July 1957
- Fate: unknown

General characteristics
- Class & type: PC-461-class submarine chaser
- Displacement: 295 tons
- Length: 174 ft (53 m)
- Beam: 23 ft (7.0 m)
- Draft: 8 ft (2.4 m)
- Speed: 20 knots
- Complement: 65
- Armament: 1 × 3 in (76 mm)/50 cal; 1 × 40 mm gun; 3 × 20 mm cannons; 2 × rocket launchers; 4 × depth charge throwers; 2 × depth charge tracks

USS PC-1142 was a PC-461-class submarine chaser built for the United States Navy during World War II. She was later renamed Hanford (PC-1142) but never saw active service under that name. Hanford was transferred to the Republic of China Navy in July 1957 and renamed ROCS Pei Chang (PC-122).

== Career ==
PC-1142 was laid down at the Defoe Shipbuilding Company in Bay City, Michigan, on 31 March 1943 and launched on 20 August 1943. PC-1142 was commissioned on 3 June 1944.

After shakedown off Florida, PC-1142 was assigned to the Naval Training Center, Miami, Florida, operating there for 2 months. She sailed on 22 September to escort a convoy to Cuba, then for the next 10 months continued escort and patrol duty between Florida and Cuba. PC-1142 departed Key West, Florida, on 22 June 1945 en route to the Pacific, arriving at San Diego, California, on 10 July.

Two weeks later, she steamed for Hawaii; then after a brief stay at Pearl Harbor arrived at Eniwetok on 24 August. For the rest of the year PC-1142 performed patrol and escort operations in the Western Pacific. On 7 January 1946 she arrived at Ponape, Caroline Islands, for assignment as a station ship. She continued these services out of Ponape and Eniwetok until 24 May when she was taken in tow by USS APL-44. PC-1142 arrived at San Diego on 30 July, remaining there for the next three months. In late October she sailed to Astoria, Oregon, and was decommissioned at Vancouver, Washington.

While berthed with the Pacific Reserve Fleet, Columbia River Group, PC-1142 was named Hanford on 15 February 1956. She was loaned to the Republic of China under the Military Assistance Program in July 1957, and served the Republic of China Navy as ROCS Pei Chang (PC-122).
