= USS PC-542 =

History

United States
- Name: USS PC-542
- Laid down: 26 February 1942
- Launched: 4 April 1942
- Commissioned: 25 May 1942
- Decommissioned: 30 September 1944
- Fate: transferred to the French Navy, 30 September 1944

History

France
- Name: Tirailleur
- Acquired: 30 September 1944
- Fate: Condemned, 1957

General characteristics
- Class & type: PC-461-class submarine chaser

USS PC-542 was a PC-461-class submarine chaser built for the United States Navy during World War II. She was transferred to the French Navy under Lend-Lease in September 1944 and renamed Tirailleur.

== Career ==
PC-542 was laid down at the Defoe Shipbuilding Company in Bay City, Michigan, on 26 February 1942; launched on 4 April 1942; and commissioned on 25 May 1942.

After commissioning, PC-542 ran convoys to Guantánamo Bay, Cuba, before sailing for the Mediterranean, arriving in Arzew, Algeria. She participated in the invasions of Scoglitti, Brolo, Salerno, and Anzio in Italy; and in Operation Dragoon—the invasion of Southern France.

On 30 September 1944, PC-542 was transferred to France under Lend-Lease, where she served as Tirailleur and was credited with shooting down two German aircraft in the Mediterranean.

She was condemned by the French Navy in 1957.

== See also ==
- List of Escorteurs of the French Navy
