= USS PC-496 =

Coordinates: 37°23′0″N 9°52′0″E

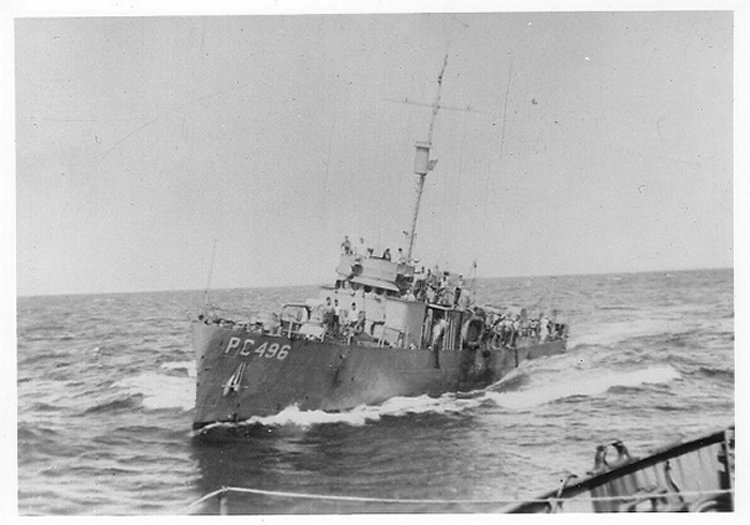
- USS PC-496

History

United States
- Name: PC-496
- Builder: Leathem D. Smith Coal and Shipbuilding Co., Sturgeon Bay, Wisconsin
- Cost: $1,600,000
- Laid down: 24 April 1941
- Launched: 22 November 1941
- Commissioned: 26 February 1942
- Fate: Sunk by naval mine, 4 June 1943

General characteristics
- Class & type: PC-461-class submarine chaser
- Displacement: 280 tons (light), 450 tons (full)
- Length: 173 feet 8 inches (52.93 meters)
- Beam: 23 feet (7.0 meters)
- Draft: 10 feet 10 inches (3.30 meters)
- Propulsion: 2 × 2,880bhp General Motors 16-258S diesel engines, 1 × Farrel-Birmingham single reduction gear, 2 × shafts
- Speed: 20.2 knots
- Complement: 65
- Armament: 1 × 3"/50 dual purpose gun mount, 1 × single 40 mm gun mount, 3 × 20 mm guns, 2 × rocket launchers, 4 × depth charge projectiles, 2 × depth charge tracks

USS PC-496 was a PC-461-class submarine chaser built for the United States Navy during World War II. She sank on 4 June 1943, in the Mediterranean. Most sources report that the submarine chaser sunk after hitting a naval mine.

== Construction ==
PC-496 was built by Leathem D. Smith Coal and Shipbuilding Co. in Sturgeon Bay, Wisconsin, being laid down on 24 April 1941. She was launched on 22 November 1941 and commissioned on 26 February 1942 at New Orleans, Louisiana. She was assigned to the European Theater of Operations where she was destroyed by an Italian torpedo off the coast of Bizerte, Tunisia, on 4 June 1943.

== Service history ==
After PC-496 was built in Sturgeon Bay, Wisconsin, she traversed the Mississippi River to New Orleans where she received her commission and captain, Lieutenant James S. Dowdell, USNR. PC-496 underwent a brief training period at the Subchaser Training Center in Miami, Florida, before she was reassigned to convoy duties running out of Norfolk, Virginia. Her area of operation expanded to include escorting oil tankers between New York City and Guantanamo Bay, Cuba where British Royal Navy frigates would escort them the rest of the way to Recife, Brazil.

PC-496 continued escorting convoys until she was tasked with escorting a convoy of LCIs to North Africa in April 1943. Upon arriving in North Africa she first made port in Beni Saf, Algeria, before moving east to Mers-el-Kebir and then to Arzew. PC-496 set out from Arzew towards Bizerte, but she never made it. On 4 June 1943, eight miles from Bizerte, a massive explosion ripped through the hull of PC-496 and she foundered in under a minute. Five members of the crew were killed in the explosion and subsequent foundering of the ship. The surviving crew members were rescued by allied ships in the area and transported to the American-occupied French naval base at La Pecherie, at Lake Bizerte, Tunisia.

== Aftermath ==
The Navy reported that the cause of PC-496's foundering was due to underwater explosions or a single blast. The surviving crewmen remember it as a single explosion and believed it to most likely have been caused by an underwater mine. However, several years later, Second Class Yeoman Carter Barber, who had been on board PC-496 at the time, heard that the explosion was caused by a torpedo fired from an Italian submarine, the commander of which had mistaken PC-496 for a destroyer, and being later court-martialed for wasting a torpedo on such a small ship.

Per naval documents in service records, one of the rescuing ships was USS SC-639 at Bizerte, Tunisia. The crew rescued 53 of the survivors of PC-496 per R.A.R. Pinkham, Lieut., USNR, Commanding.
