= USS PC-1168 =

PC-461-class submarine chaser of the U.S. Navy

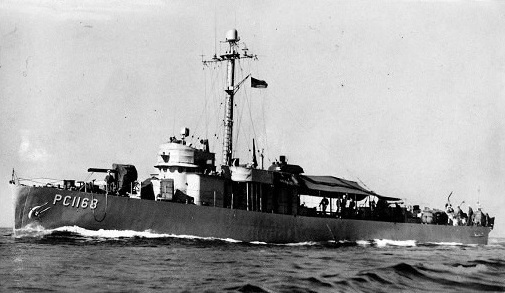
- USS PC-1168

History

United States
- Name: USS PC-1168
- Builder: Sullivan Drydock and Repair Corporation, Brooklyn, NY
- Laid down: 3 April 1943
- Launched: 3 July 1943
- Commissioned: 3 December 1943
- Decommissioned: 19 May 1954
- Fate: 19 May 1954, transferred to Republic of China Navy
- Stricken: 16 December 1970

History

Taiwan
- Name: ROCS Ching Kiang (PC-116)
- Acquired: 19 May 1954
- Decommissioned: 16 December 1970

General characteristics
- Class & type: PC-461-class submarine chaser
- Displacement: 295 tons fully loaded
- Length: 175 ft (53 m)
- Beam: 23 ft (7.0 m)
- Draft: 10 ft 10 in (3.30 m)
- Propulsion: 2 × General Motors 16-278A diesel engines (Serial No. 14240 and 14241), two shafts.
- Speed: 20 knots
- Complement: 59
- Armament: 1 × 3 in (76 mm)/50 cal; 1 × 40 mm gun; 3 × 20 mm cannons; 2 × rocket launchers; 4 × depth charge throwers; 2 × depth charge tracks

USS PC-1168 was a PC-461-class submarine chaser built for the United States Navy during World War II. PC-1168 is notable for being the ship on which the film You're in the Navy Now, which starred Gary Cooper, was filmed in 1950. The ship was later transferred to the Republic of China Navy, serving from 1954 to 1970 as ROCS Ching Kiang (PC-116).

== Career ==
PC-1168 was laid down on 3 April 1943 at the Sullivan Drydock and Repair Corporation in Brooklyn, New York. She was launched on 3 July and commissioned 3 December 1943, one of 403 members of her class of 173-foot steel-hulled submarine chasers. These ships were of a flush-deck design similar to that of World War I "four-piper" destroyers, but were half the size and complement of their big sisters.

On 19 May 1954 she was decommissioned and transferred to the Republic of China as PC-116.

== Sources ==
- Photo gallery of USS PC-1168 at NavSource Naval History
