= USS PGM-17 =

Gunboat of the United States Navy

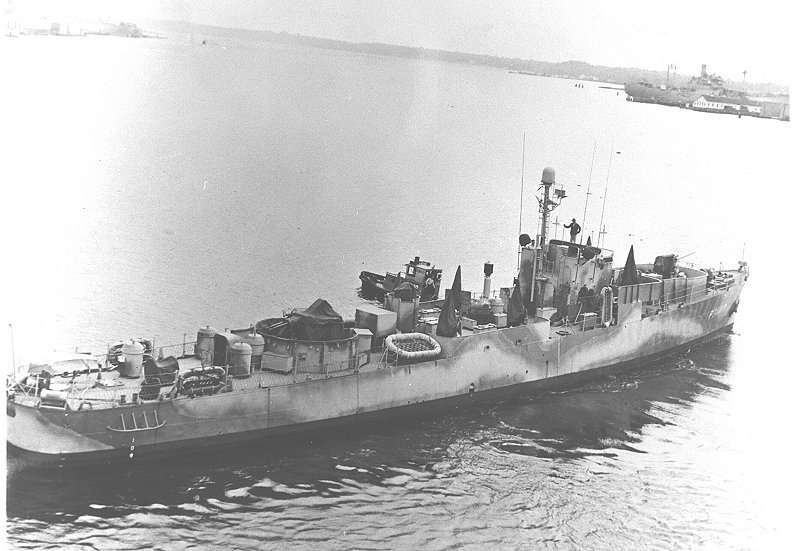
- USS PGM-17

History

United States
- Name: USS PC-1189
- Builder: Gibbs Gas Engine Co.; Jacksonville, Florida
- Laid down: 10 August 1943
- Launched: 14 April 1944
- Renamed: USS PGM-17, 16 August 1944
- Commissioned: 24 November 1944
- Decommissioned: 2 July 1945
- Honors and awards: 1 battle star for Battle of Okinawa
- Fate: grounded, May 1945; salvaged, sunk in deep water, October 1945

General characteristics
- Class & type: PC-461-class submarine chaser
- Reclassified: PGM-9-class gunboat, 16 August 1944
- Displacement: 280 tons (light), 450 tons (full)
- Length: 173 feet, 8 inches
- Beam: 23 feet
- Draft: 10 feet, 10 inches
- Propulsion: two 2,560bhp Hooven-Owen-Rentschler RB-99 DA diesel engines, Westinghouse single reduction gear, two shafts
- Speed: 20 knots
- Complement: 65
- Armament: 1 × 3 in (76 mm)/50 cal; 1 × twin 40 mm gun; 6 × 20 mm cannons; 1 × twin .50 cal (12.7 mm) machine gun; 1 × 60 mm mortar

USS PGM-17 was a PGM-9-class motor gunboat built for the United States Navy during World War II. She was laid down and launched as USS PC-1189, a PC-461-class submarine chaser, but was renamed and reclassified before her November 1944 commissioning. She ran aground near Okinawa in May 1945. She was salvaged a month later, but was never repaired. She was towed to deep water and sunk in October 1945.

== Career ==
PC-1189 was laid down on 10 August 1943 and launched 14 April 1944. She was renamed and reclassified PGM-17, a PGM-9 gunboat on 16 August 1944. She was commissioned as USS PGM-17 on 24 November 1944 and assigned to the Pacific theater. USS PGM-17 participated in the assault and occupation of Okinawa between 25 March and 4 May 1945 before striking a reef. She was salvaged and towed to Zamami Shima, Kerama Retta and beached at Agana Ura. She was decommissioned on 2 June 1945. USS PGM-17 was disposed of by sinking off the coast of Kerama Retta in October 1945.

== Service ==
After her commission, PGM-17 was sent to the Pacific theater and was involved in the Battle of Okinawa. During the first days of the battle, PGM-17 spotted and destroyed several Japanese mines with small arms fire. On the first day of the ground invasion of Okinawa, on 1 April 1945, PGM-17 shot down a Japanese Aichi "Val" dive bomber. PGM-17 spent the month of April and the beginning of May scouting and destroying mines, offering assistance to disabled and damaged ships, running supplies, and fending off kamikaze attacks.

On 4 May 1945, USS PGM-17 ran aground an uncharted coral reef off the coast of Kouri Jima. A salvage tug arrived a few hours later and prepared to tow the ship. At first, the hull had no damage, but as high waves caused PGM-17 to relentlessly bash into the reef, it became clear that salvaging the ship was unlikely. On 5 May, the captain, Lieutenant Edwin L. Williams Jr. ordered all hands to abandon ship. The salvage attempt was abandoned due to rough waters. On 7 May 1945, salvage ship USS Deliver (AR-23) began salvaging PGM-17. Deliver spent five days pumping water off PGM-17 and patching the hull. However, Deliver was called off to assist USS Hugh W. Hadley (DD-774) which had been struck by three kamikaze aircraft. It wasn't until two weeks later that LCI-738 began salvaging PGM-17 on 27 May 1945. After almost two weeks of salvage work, PGM-17 was finally pulled off the reef on 9 June 1945, spending over a month stranded on the reef. Despite heavy kamikaze attacks throughout the region, PMG-17 managed to go the entire time without taking enemy fire.

On 9 June 1945, USS PGM-17 was towed to the Agono Urn Cove on Zamami Shima where she was grounded on shallow water. On 2 July, she was decommissioned and left until October 1945 when she was towed out to deep waters and sunk.
