= USS PC-568 =

- “Print from the family collection of Hobart Andry.”

History

United States
- Name: USS PC-568
- Builder: Brown Shipbuilding Company, Houston, Texas
- Laid down: 15 September 1941
- Launched: 25 April 1942
- Commissioned: 13 July 1942
- Decommissioned: 30 April 1946
- Renamed: Altus, February 1956
- Namesake: Altus, Oklahoma
- Stricken: 15 March 1963
- Fate: Transferred to United States Air Force

General characteristics
- Class & type: PC-461-class submarine chaser
- Length: 174 ft (53 m)
- Beam: 23 ft (7.0 m)
- Draft: 10 ft 10 in (3.30 m)
- Speed: 20.2 knots
- Complement: 65
- Armament: 1 × 3 in (76 mm)/50 cal dual purpose gun; 1 × 40 mm gun; 3 × 20 mm cannons

USS PC-568 was a PC-461-class submarine chaser built for the United States Navy during World War II. The ship was later named USS Altus (PC-568) in honor of Altus, Oklahoma, but never saw any active service under that name. After she was struck from the Naval Vessel Register in 1963, she was transferred to the United States Air Force.

== Career ==
PC-568 was laid down by Brown Shipbuilding Company in Houston, Texas on 15 September 1941, launched on 25 April 1942, and commissioned on 13 July 1942.

Following a brief period of shakedown training, the submarine chaser reported to Commander, Caribbean Sea Frontier, for duty. The vessel carried out convoy and antisubmarine patrols from Key West and Miami, Florida to various ports in the Caribbean. Among her ports of call were Guantanamo Bay and Havana, Cuba, San Juan, Puerto Rico, Bridgetown, Barbados, Trinidad, Aruba, and Curaçao. In April 1943, PC-568 reported to Commander, Eastern Sea Frontier, and began a series of convoy and antisubmarine patrols from New York City to Guantanamo Bay.

On 25 March 1944, the submarine chaser departed New York City and proceeded to the United Kingdom. Upon her arrival the ship reported to Commander, United States Naval Forces Europe, and became a member of the 12th Fleet. PC-568 then became involved in preparations for the Allied invasion of France. When the assault troops first went ashore on the beaches of Normandy, on 6 June, the submarine chaser assumed convoy duty in the English Channel and also carried out patrol duty along the French coast.

PC-568 operated in the English Channel through June 1945. In that month, she began providing services to American occupation forces in Germany. The ship remained in this role through 4 October, when she set sail from Bremerhaven, Germany, bound for the United States. She visited Plymouth, England, Ponta del Gada, Azores, and Bermuda before arriving at Norfolk, Virginia, on 22 October.

Preparations for deactivation of the vessel were then begun at Norfolk. She got underway again on 8 January 1946 to sail to Mayport, Florida. PC-568 was decommissioned on 30 April 1946 and was laid up in the St. Johns River, Green Cove Springs, Florida. In February 1956, the ship was named Altus. Her name was struck from the Navy list on 15 March 1963, and the ship was transferred permanently to the custody of the United States Air Force.
