= USS Castine (IX-211) =

US Navy submarine chaser

History

United States
- Name: Castine
- Namesake: Castine, Maine
- Laid down: 14 March 1940
- Launched: 23 August 1941
- Commissioned: 1 May 1944
- Decommissioned: 3 October 1945
- Fate: unknown

General characteristics
- Displacement: 348 tons
- Length: 173.8 ft (53.0 m)
- Beam: 23 ft (7.0 m)
- Propulsion: Beasler boilers with DeLaval turbines

USS Castine (IX-211), formally PC-452, was a submarine chaser of the United States Navy.

PC-452 was laid down on 14 March 1940 at the DeFoe Boat and Motor Works in Bay City, Michigan, as Hull #167, under the Experimental Small Craft program of 17 May 1938. She was launched on 23 August 1941 and towed to the Philadelphia Navy Yard to be fitted out with boilers, and commissioned as USS PC-452 on 1 May 1944.

PC-452 was to be used as a steam turbine test bed hull, while PC-451, also an experimental ship built at Defoe, used diesel electric drive. Originally called "X-Boats," they differed in detail and were listed as 165 footers, even though they were 173 feet long.

PC-452 was reclassified as an Unclassified Miscellaneous Auxiliary and assigned the hull number, "IX-211". She was then renamed Castine after the town in Maine on 10 March 1945. Castine was decommissioned on 3 October 1945; struck from the Naval Register, and transferred to the Maritime Commission for disposal in January 1947. Her ultimate fate is unknown.

PC-452's executive officer, Lt.(j.g.) John W. Hazard, wrote an article for The New Yorker recounting the steam propulsion experiments that became the basis for the 1951 comedy film You're in the Navy Now.
