= USS PGM-9 =

Gunboat of the United States Navy

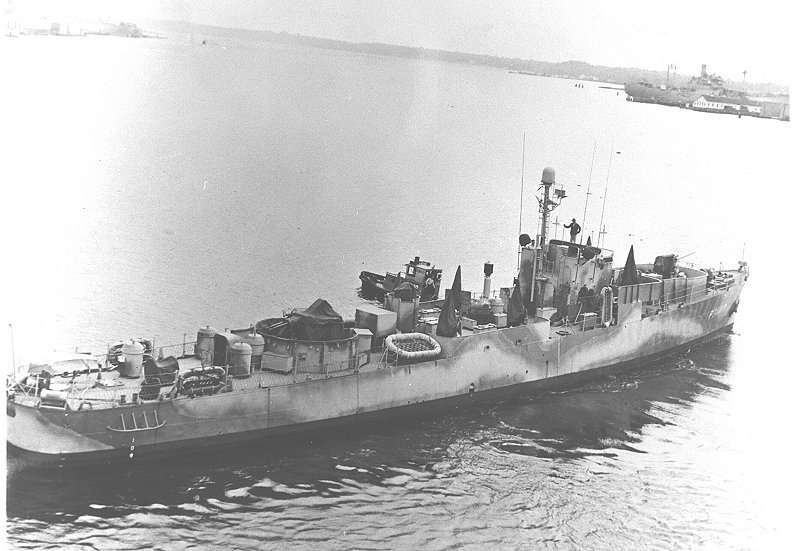
- Sister ship USS PGM-17

History

United States
- Name: PGM-9
- Builder: Consolidated Ship Building Corp.
- Laid down: 19 December 1943
- Launched: 13 February 1944
- Commissioned: 1 July 1944
- Decommissioned: 10 December 1945
- Stricken: 3 January 1946
- Identification: Ship International Radio Callsign: NITT
- Fate: Scrapped 27 December 1945

General characteristics
- Class & type: PGM-9-class motor gunboat
- Displacement: 450 tons
- Length: 173 ft 8 in (52.93 m)
- Beam: 23 ft (7.0 m)
- Draft: 10 ft 10 in (3.30 m)
- Propulsion: 2 x 1,440 bhp (1,070 kW) General Motors 16-278A diesel engines
- Speed: 20.2 knots (37.4 km/h; 23.2 mph)
- Complement: 65
- Armament: 1 x 3"/50 dual purpose gun; 1 x 40 mm gun; 6 × 20 mm guns; 2 x .50 cal (12.7 mm) machine guns; 1 x rocket launcher

USS PGM-9 was a PGM-9-class motor gunboat in service with the United States Navy during World War II.

== Ship history ==
Laid down by Consolidated Ship Building Corp. on 19 December 1943, as PC-1548, she was launched on 13 February 1944. On 1 July 1944, she was commissioned into naval service. She underwent a conversion to a Motor Gunboat on 4 February 1944, and was renamed PGM-9, re-entering service shortly thereafter.

=== Ships fate ===
On 9 October 1945, at Buckner Bay, Okinawa, in Typhoon Louise PGM-9 ran aground on Hira Sone Reef at 15:11. At 15:45, all personnel safely crossed to YF-744 which had grounded alongside.

Effectively put out of commission due to damage from running aground, she remained grounded on the reef and was decommissioned on 10 December 1945. PGM-9 was demolished 17 days later on 27 December 1945, and finally struck from the Naval Register on 3 January 1946.
