= PGM-9-class motor gunboat =

Warfare ship type

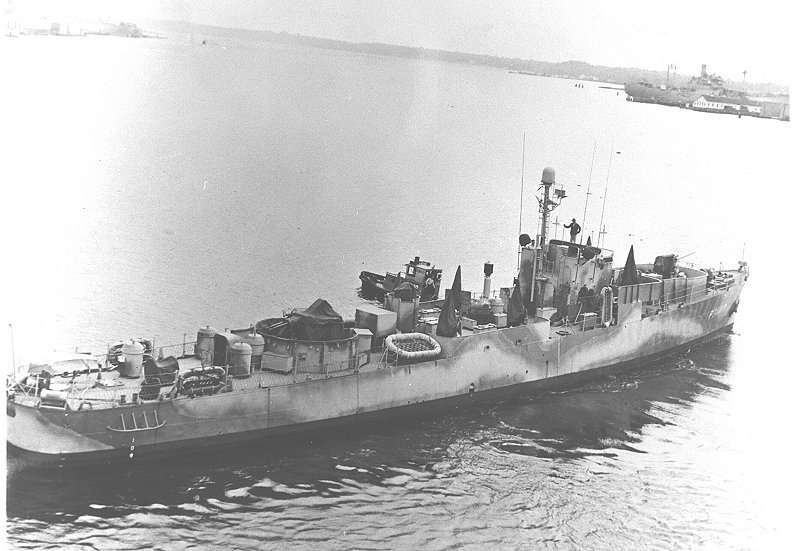
- PGM-17

Class overview
- Operators: United States Navy; Philippine Navy
- Preceded by: PGM-1 class
- Succeeded by: PGM-39 class
- Built: 1943-1945
- Planned: 24
- Completed: 24

General characteristics
- Type: Patrol gunboat, motor (PGM)
- Displacement: 450 tons
- Length: 173 ft 8 in (52.93 m)
- Beam: 23 ft (7.0 m)
- Draft: 10 ft 10 in (3.30 m)
- Installed power: 2 × diesel engines; 1,440 brake horsepower (1,070 kW)
- Propulsion: 2 screws
- Speed: 20.2 knots (37.4 km/h; 23.2 mph)
- Complement: 65
- Armament: 1 × 3"/50 dual-purpose gun; 1 × twin 40 mm gun; 6 × 20 mm guns; 2 × .50 cal (12.7 mm) machine guns

The PGM-9-class motor gunboats were a class of 24 gunboats converted for the United States Navy from 1944 to 1945, succeeding the PGM-1-class motor gunboats. All 24 PGM-9s were converted from PC-461-class submarine chasers while still under construction. The PGM-9s were created to support PT boats in the Pacific, but were too slow to keep up, and were shifted to support minesweeping ships instead.

== Bibliography ==
- Friedman, Norman (1987). U.S. Small Combatants, Including PT-boats, Subchasers, and the Brown-water Navy: An Illustrated Design History. Annapolis, Maryland: Naval Institute Press. ISBN 0-87021-713-5.
