= Bonny Landing =

Nigerian amphibious landing during the Nigerian Civil War

- Part of Nigerian Civil War
Date	25–26 July 1967
Location	Bonny Island, Rivers State, Nigeria; 4°26′57″N 7°14′24″E
Result	Nigerian victory

Belligerents
Nigeria	Biafra

Commanders and leaders
Nelson Soroh; Benjamin Adekunle; James Rawe	Nicholas Ohiaeri (POW); Pascal J. Odu

Units involved
Third Division	

Strength
1540 soldiers 1 frigate 4 patrol boats 2 merchant ships 1 survey vessel 1 landing craft tank	300 soldiers 1 patrol boat

Casualties and losses
	1 patrol boat scuttled
- ~200 casualties (Note: "...most of whom were secessionist soldiers.")

The Bonny Landing was a Nigerian amphibious operation carried out on 25 July 1967 during the early stages of the Nigerian Civil War. The landings occurred on the Biafran-held Bonny Island and the adjacent Bonny River.

After the declaration of a blockade and subsequent police action against Biafra, the Nigerian Navy began drawing up plans for an amphibious operation on Bonny, the first action involving Nigerian naval forces since the 1914 Naval operations against German Kamerun. The capture of Bonny, which housed Nigeria's only export terminal for crude oil, also meant to secure the backing of Shell-BP and British government for the federal cause.

A taskforce of nine ships under Captain Nelson Soroh and troops of Benjamin Adekunle's Third Division left Lagos on 22 July. After a brief bombardment and naval engagement they overcame the light Biafran defenses to secure the Island by the next day.

The Bonny landing was the first amphibious operation by a modern Black African armed force in history.

== Background ==
Following secession, The Biafran government immediately sought to assert control over its petroleum industry to establish their new nation's economic viability. During the 60's, The former Eastern Region made up approximately 63 percent of Nigeria's petroleum output of which the British consortium Shell-BP was responsible for 84 percent of production. On 19 June, the Permanent Secretary in the Biafran Ministry of Finance wrote to the Shell-BP requesting payment of royalties, estimating its operations for half of 1967 at £3.51 million. Initially, Shell-BP seemed inclined towards paying the royalty, as despite Biafra's unclear future prospects, the state had de facto control over its claimed territory. However, a 21 June meeting between Biafran and Shell-BP representatives over payment of the royalty proved inconclusive. The Biafrans then doubled the demanded royalty to £7 million but now offered to accept a token payment of £250,000, which was considered by the representatives of Shell-BP.

The federal government meanwhile responded to secession by imposing economic sanctions against Biafra, above all a blockade on all exports and imports except crude petroleum. the Nigerian government mandated that all earnings from oil sales continue to accrue to Lagos until the semi-annual royalties were due on July 10. Rumors of a Shell-BP suspense account and supposed payment to the Biafrans prompted the federal government to extend the embargo to oil tankers in early July, effectively stopping Nigerian crude exports altogether. Under pressure to show federal resolve the military head of state Yakubu Gowon announced the start of police action against Biafra a few days later on 6 July.

=== Planning ===
New Army Chief of Staff Joseph Akahan began drawing up plans for an amphibious assault on the Biafran coast. James Rawe, a British expatriate serving as Principal Staff Officer and Commander of the Naval Base in Apapa was largely in charge of planning the operation. Rawe, who was trained as a commando with the Combined Operations and participated in the Utah Beach landings, was one of the few—if not the only—officers in the Nigerian Navy with any experience in amphibious operations. His postwar service in the Hydrographic Survey Service also gave him extensive knowledge of the Nigerian coastline. Rawe went on to author Nigeria's amphibious doctrine and, together with the Chief of Naval Staff J. E. A. Wey, drew up the country's overall naval strategy for the war.

Wey received from Gowon a list of landing sites, of which three were considered the most viable: Port Harcourt, Opobo, and Bonny Island. Port Harcourt, despite being the most valuable target with its harbour facilities and nearby oil fields was ruled out. The city laid 40 miles and a four to six hour journey up the Bonny River, which would have given the Biafrans not only forewarning to prepare their defenses but an opportunity to ambush the convoy with artillery along the narrow innermost 20‑mile stretch of the river. Opobo purportedly seemed a more promising site as it was located near the mouth of the Imo River, but was likewise rejected as the waters were presumed to be shallow and obstructed by river bars. Bonny Island was ultimately considered the best possible location for an amphibious operation as the adjacent mouth of the eponymous river was wide enough to maneuver and had deep water up to the shoreline. Strategically, capturing Bonny would relieve the Nigerian navy of the task of blockading the Bonny River and establish a forward operating base for future amphibious operations. In addition, seizing the island's oil export terminal, the only such facility in the region would send a clear message to Shell‑BP and foreign observers over who controlled oil exports.

1965 Nautical map of the Bonny River entrance

A taskforce of nine ships were assembled for the operation: The frigate and flagship of the Nigerian navy Nigeria, a submarine chaser Ogoja, three seaward defence boats: Enugu, Benin, Kaduna and a Landing craft tank Lokoja. Two merchant ships, Bode Thomas and King Jaja served as troop and supply carriers. Rawe's survey ship the Penelope was converted into a military vessel. Captain Nelson Soroh, the commanding officer of the Nigeria, served as the officer in charge of the operation. Under him, Lieutenant Colonel Benjamin Adekunle commanded the land forces of the Third Division, while Rawe was designated Naval Liaison and Forward Control Officer to organize the operation aboard the Penelope. Other commanders included Lieutenant Colonel Husaini Abdullahi on Enugu and Lieutenant Commander Akintunde Aduwo on Ogoja.

Under the operational plan, Penelope was to lead the main landing force into the mouth of the Bonny River during the opening bombardment. Concurrently the Nigeria was to deliver supporting fire from a safe distance several nautical miles offshore in the Atlantic. Only after enemy forces were suppressed was the Lokoja to land on the northernmost jetties on Bonny town, followed by Nigeria moving into the channel to disembark her forces and then by the two merchant ships once the town was secured. In preparation for the assault, daytime and nighttime amphibious exercises and integrated operations were conducted at Tarkwa Bay Beach before the task force departed Lagos on 22 July.

Meanwhile, the Biafran leadership assumed the Nigerian Navy was incapable of carrying out amphibious operations. Biafran President Ojukwu reportedly laughed when questioned on the possibility by British and American diplomats. Besides being viewed as incompetent, most of Eastern sailors and officers serving in the Navy deserted to the Biafran side, many of whom had sabotaged most of the naval equipment on board the ships before they left. Regardless, their defense on Bonny consisted of approximately 300 soldiers commanded by Sub Lieutenant Nicholas Ohiaeri and one seaward defence boat Ibadan, the only ship of the Biafran Navy. The ship's commander Pascal Odu had anticipated eastern secession and repeatedly delayed orders by the Nigerian Navy to head for Lagos before ultimately defecting to Biafra along with most of his crew. The Biafran Research and Production experimented with igniting an oil slick to block the entrance of the Bonny River in the event on an invasion, but were unsuccessful.

== Battle ==
By 25 July, all vessels had reached the rendezvous point at the Bonny Fairway Buoy and began moving into their respective area of operations. Amid a torrential downpour, at first daylight Soroh gave the order to execute operations and began pounding enemy positions on Bonny from the Nigeria as Rawe on Penelope led the landing force into the Bonny River. As the ships sailed past the Bonny Oil Terminal, the order was given to fire on the signal station and telegraph office to cut off Bonny's connections to Port Harcourt.

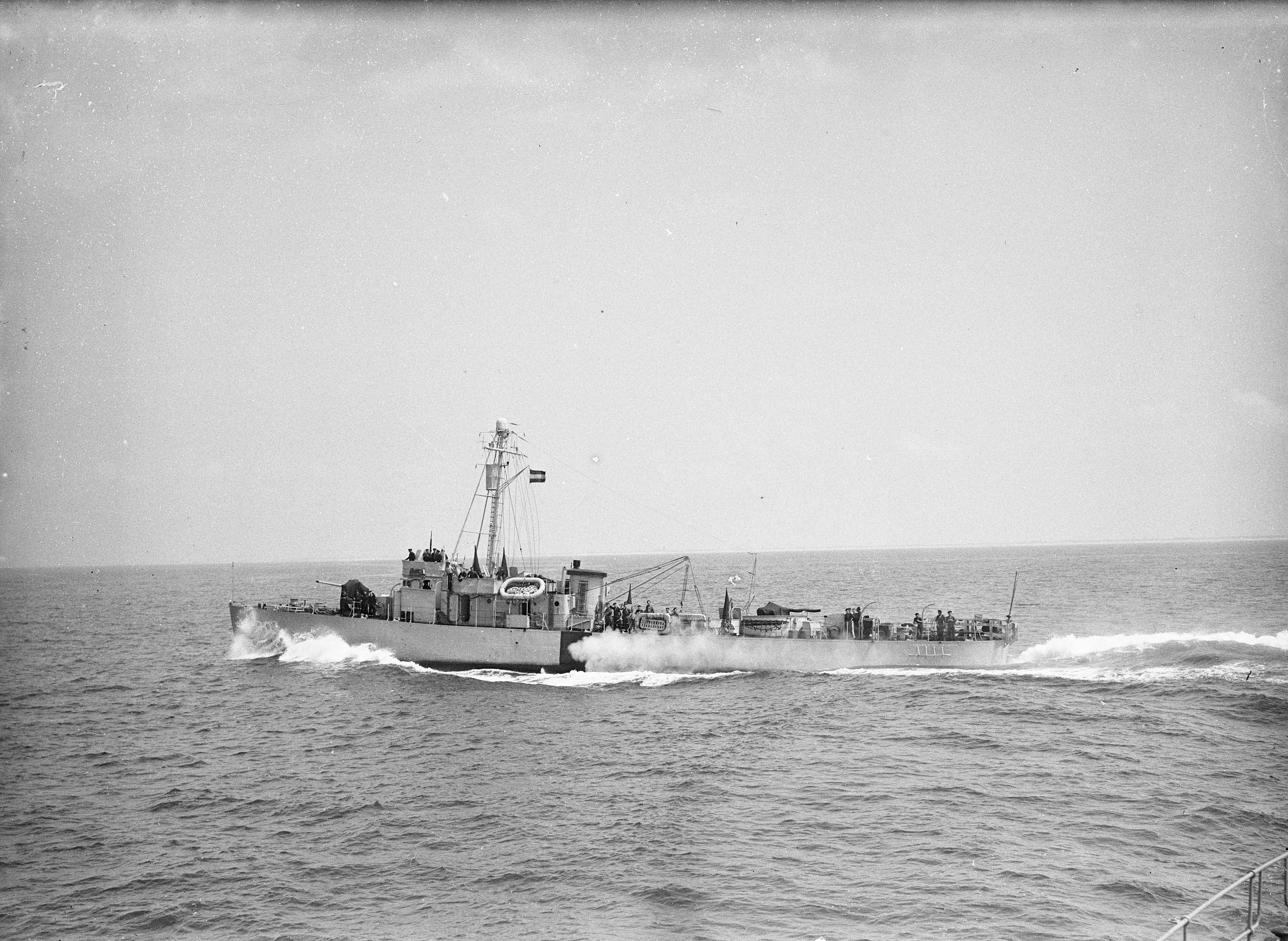
NNS Ogoja while in service in the Dutch navy as Queen Wilhelmina

As they proceeded with the bombardment the task force spotted the Ibadan, moving northwards along the Bonny River. Rawe ordered the Ogoja under Aduwo to detach from the convoy and give chase. Several salvos were fired from her 3-inch gun. The significantly outgunned Ibadan returned fire with her 40 mm anti-aircraft gun which reputedly jammed "every third or fourth round". Odu improvised evasive maneuvers where he would speed in the opposite direction to evade the fire from the Ogoja as well as giving his crew time to unjam the gun. Thereafter, he would make a sharp turn and return to fire again. By the second or third time he employed the maneuver his ship entered shallow waters and ran aground on side of the Degema channel. The now stationary Ibadan took a direct hit on her stern, jamming the propeller and creating an intense fire in the engine room trapping many of the men below deck. Odu soon gave the order to abandon ship and under cover of the smoke billowing from the ship the remaining crew escaped into a nearby mangrove swamp. Ogoja later rejoined the taskforce and Aduwo reported to Rawe that he had sunk the Ibadan.

With the Ibadan neutralized, the Nigeria together with Benin and Enugu continued the bombardment, dislogding Biafran positions on Bonny, including the command center at the Bonny Post Office. The 6th battalion under Major Gibson Jalo was the first to land on the beach and quickly routed the Biafran forces, securing the beach and main road. The 7th and 8th battalions followed up landing and occupying the Shell installation. While landing the second wave Lokoja became stranded and was only freed by the high tide. On the second day Benin temporarily ran-aground for six hours. Later, a friendly fire incident between the naval artillery and the 6th Battalion resulted in one dead and 17 wounded, including Jalo. There were around 200 casualties total on both sides, most of whom were secessionist soldiers. Additional Nigerian landings with rubber dinghies occurred at Peterside beach across the Bonny River, and at Dawes Island 20 miles upstream.

== Aftermath ==
The capture of Bonny would go on to cement the relationship between Nigeria and the United Kingdom during the civil war. At 1967, Nigerian oil had made up around ten percent of British consumption. Nigerian oil was also particularly crucial to Britain due to the ongoing 1967 Arab oil embargo and the closure of the Suez Canal increasing travel times for tankers. The British government and Shell-BP initially hoped to stay neutral in the crisis while maintaining the flow of oil despite upcoming royalty payments. However, Biafran threats to stop production and the Nigerian expansion of the blockade to include oil put immense pressure on the British to pick a side. On 8 July the British Commonwealth Minister George Thomas warned Gowon that the continued Nigerian blockade on oil would damage goodwill in London with particular respect to military assistance. By late July however, the British realized that Nigeria's successes in the field and its refusal to relent on the blockade made the federal government the safer party to back. Shell-BP publicly continued to stall in negotiations while privately assuring the Nigerians that royalties would be paid to them. When the Biafrans realized the royalty was never coming they shut down production and in August the last Shell-BP employees left Biafra.

After the loss of Bonny the Biafrans regrouped their forces at Port Harcourt. They anticipated that the city would be the next target and fortified the approaching waterways with improvised naval mines and obstacles.

=== Operation Sea Jack ===
Operation Sea Jack
- Part of Nigerian Civil War
Date	25 September 1967 – 8 January 1968 (3 months and 2 weeks)
Location	Bonny Island, Rivers State, Nigeria; 4°26′57″N 7°14′24″E
Result	Nigerian victory

Belligerents
Nigeria	Biafra

Commanders and leaders
Abdulsalami Abubakar; Lieutenant Sereki †	Major Ekwedike

Casualties and losses
1 patrol boat sunk	

During the Biafran invasion of the Midwest Region, the Nigerians redeployed most of their army forces and all their ships for landings at Escravos, Sapele, Warri and Koko. This redeployment included their most experienced officers and soldiers, leaving the poorly trained and led to garrison Bonny. The Island was defended only by the troops of the 7th Battalion led by Lieutenant Commander Abdulsalami Abubakar and company at neighboring Peterside beach. The Biafran military intelligence learned of this and on 25 September launched an operation to recapture the island codenamed Operation Sea Jack. Their attack included a tugboat armed with a 105mm howitzer named Ikwerre and with two shallow draft boats Nsiko and Pepeye as troop transports. The Biafrans were also aerially supported by several captured Shell Helicopters and Biafran Air Force bombers. Major Ekwedike commanded the operation.

The Nigerian forces on Bonny were quickly overwhelmed and pushed back to the town itself. At the same time, a battalion sized Biafran force attacked Peterside beach, during which the town was destroyed. The Biafrans also took advantage of inadequate Nigerian patrols to shell Bonny at night with their makeshift vessels. The timely return of Nigeria and then Ogoja to Bonny narrowly prevented the defenders from being overrun. The Ogoja distinguished herself again providing effective supporting fire while being nimble enough to maneuver in the narrow creeks. The Biafran field intelligence nicknamed her Hot Iron and deliberately timed their attacks for whenever she was absent. During the fighting the seaward defence boat NNS Sapele was lost along with its commander Lieutenant Sereki when it was attacked by several Biafran gunboats and planes. Although the Biafrans managed to temporarily recapture Dawes Island, the Nigerians would control Bonny for the rest of the war.

== Notes and references ==
=== General and cited references ===
- Makinde, Adeyinka (2 July 2024). "The Bonny Landing: The anatomy of Black Africa's first amphibious operation, July to September 1967". The Mariner's Mirror. 110 (3): 335–349. doi:10.1080/00253359.2024.2371202. SSRN 4531431.
- Odu, P. J. (2009). The Future That Vanished: A Biafra Story. US: Xlibris. pp. 114–117. ISBN 978-1-4415-3973-1.
- Warren, Godfrey B. (1979). "Petroleum and The Nigerian Civil War 1967-1970". The Fletcher Forum. 3 (2): 66–81. ISSN 0147-0981. JSTOR 45330966.
- Uche, Chibuike (2008). "Oil, British Interests and the Nigerian Civil War". The Journal of African History. 49 (1): 111–135. doi:10.1017/S0021853708003393. ISSN 0021-8537. JSTOR 40206616.
- Davis, Morris (July 1973). "Negotiating About Biafran Oil". African Issues. 3 (2): 23–32. doi:10.2307/1166625. ISSN 0047-1607. JSTOR 1166625.
- Doron, Roy (2025). Biafra: a military history. Bloomington: Indiana University Press. pp. 92–94. ISBN 9780253073884.
- Stapleton, Timothy J. (2022). African navies: historical and contemporary perspectives. London New York: Routledge, Taylor & Francis Group. ISBN 9781000782875.
