= HNLMS Queen Wilhelmina =

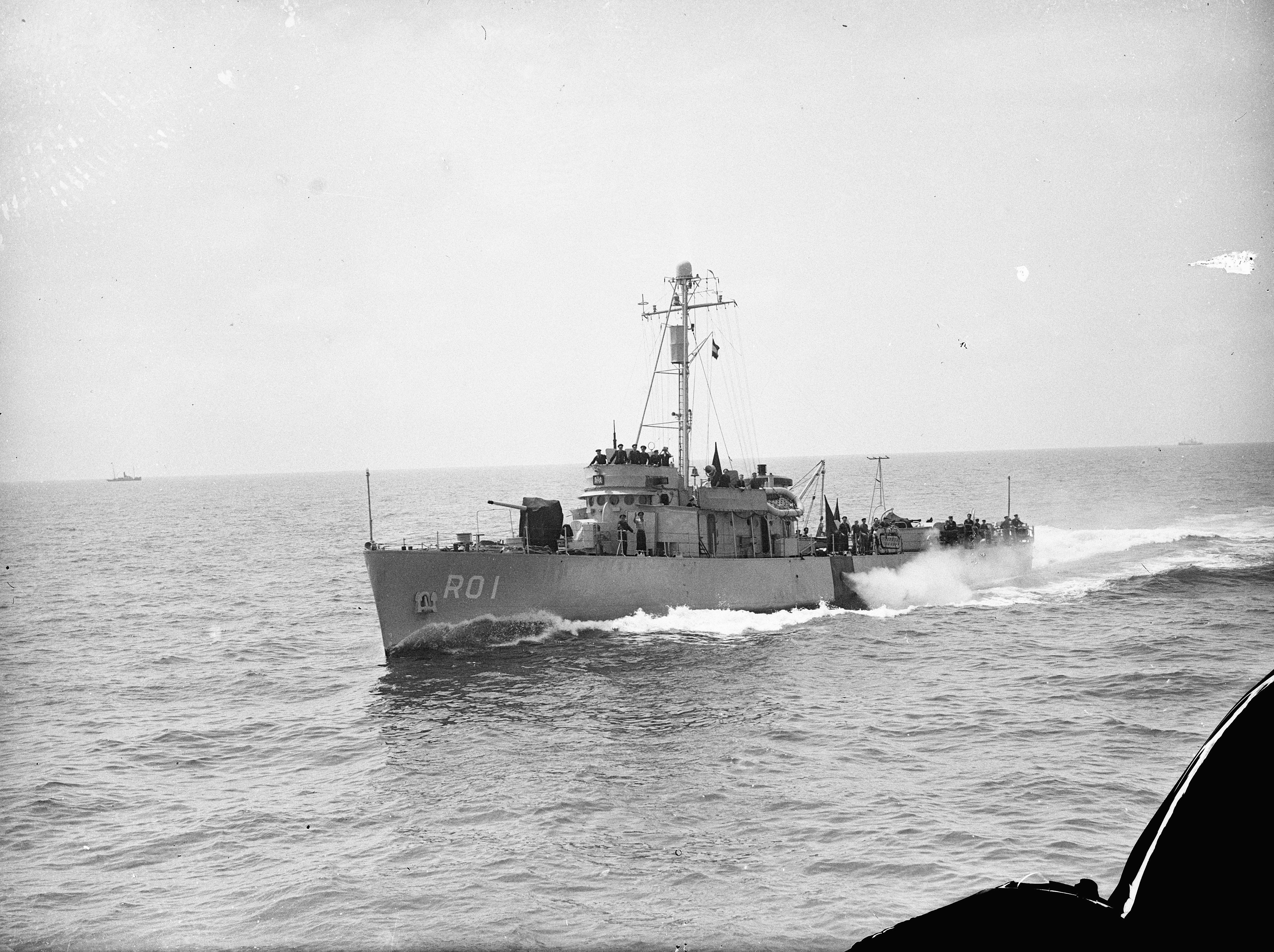
- HNLMS Queen Wilhelmina

History

Netherlands
- Name: Queen Wilhelmina
- Namesake: Wilhelmina of the Netherlands
- Builder: George Lawley & Sons, Neponset, Massachusetts
- Laid down: 1 January 1942
- Launched: 30 April 1942
- Commissioned: 6 August 1942
- Nickname(s): Queen of the Caribbean
- Fate: Sold to Nigeria

Nigeria
- Name: Ogoja
- Namesake: Ogoja
- Acquired: 1963
- Fate: Grounded and abandoned in the Nun River, 25 October 1969.

General characteristics
- Class & type: PC-461-class submarine chaser
- Displacement: 450 tons
- Length: 173 ft 8 in (52.93 m)
- Beam: 23 ft 0 in (7.01 m)
- Draft: 6 ft 2.5 in (1.892 m)
- Propulsion: 2 × 1,440 bhp (1,070 kW) Fairbanks Morse diesel engines 2 × shafts
- Speed: 20.2 knots (37.4 km/h; 23.2 mph)
- Range: 3,000 nmi (5,600 km; 3,500 mi) at 12 knots (22 km/h; 14 mph)
- Complement: 55
- Armament: 1 × 3 in (76 mm)/50 cal. High Angle-Low Angle Mk22 gun 1 × 40 mm Bofors gun 5 × single 20 mm cannons 2 × K-guns 2 × depth charge racks

HNLMS Queen Wilhelmina was a PC 461 class submarine chaser of the Royal Netherlands Navy (RNLN). The ship was built in the United States as PC 468 and originally meant to be commissioned into the United States Navy. On 30 April 1942, however, the vessel was gifted by the President of the United States to the Netherlands and soon after named Queen Wilhelmina. It served in the RNLN between 1942 and 1963. In 1963 the Queen Wilhemina was loaned to the Nigerian Navy and was renamed NNS Ogoja. Two years later, in 1965, this loan was turned into a gift.

== Design and construction ==
Queen Wilhelmina was built at George Lawley & Son in the United States. The ship was laid down originally as PC 468 for the United States Navy on 1 January 1942 and belonged as submarine chaser to the PC 461 class. On 30 April 1942 PC 468 was launched and gifted to the Netherlands by the American President Roosevelt. A few months later, on 6 August 1942, the ship was officially handed over to the Royal Netherlands Navy by the American government and commissioned as Queen Wilhelmina. The ceremony at the Washington Navy Yard was attended by many officials, including Queen Wilhelmina of the Netherlands and President Roosevelt.

== Service history ==
=== Netherlands ===
After Queen Wilhelmina was transferred on 6 August 1942 to the Royal Netherlands Navy, it was immediately put under American operational command. The ship was based at Key West and operated during the Second World War in the Caribbean. On 11 October 1942 Queen Wilhelmina arrived at Curaçao and began escorting convoys. In one 1944 action she participated in rescuing survivors from an American tanker that had been torpedoed off the coast of Colombia, near Aruba. As a result of distinguishing itself by successfully escorting several convoys in the West Indies the ship was nicknamed Queen of the Caribbean.

After the end of the Second World War the Queen Wilhelmina patrolled for some time the waters of the Dutch provinces Zeeland and South-Holland to inspect Dutch fishers and prevent Belgian fishers from fishing in Dutch territorial waters.

On 24 June 1947 Queen Wilhelmina, together with HNLMS Soemba and HNLMS Karel Doorman, set course for Norway. While sailing through different fjords the ships performed tactical exercises.

In 1953, the ship was put into reserve.

In 1963 Queen Wilhelmina was loaned to the Royal Nigerian Navy to serve as its interim flagship, pending the construction in the Netherlands and commissioning of the frigate NNS Nigeria.

=== Nigeria ===
NNS Ogoja was commanded on its delivery voyage by Captain and future Nigerian Admiral Nelson Soroh, arriving in Lagos on 27 September 1963.

By 1967 Ogoja was under the command of Lieutenant Commander Akintunde Aduwo. During the Nigerian Civil War Ogoja participated in the Nigerian littoral blockade of Biafran territory. Between 25-26 July 1967, Ogoja, was part of a fleet of seven Nigerian Navy ships and two merchant ships that landed troops at Bonny. During the operation Ogoja engaged the Biafran Navy's sole vessel, a former Nigerian Ford-class seaward defence boat named the Ibadan, in the Bonny River. During the one-sided action Ibadan's main gun, a 40 mm anti-aircraft gun, kept jamming after 3-4 rounds had been fired and as she maneuvered to avoid Ogoja's fire she ran aground close to shore. While stranded Ibadan was hit in her engine by shellfire from Ogoja's 3-inch gun, forcing the crew to abandon ship. During the battle she also shelled Biafran targets on Bonny town.

During the Midwest Invasion of 1967 by Biafran forces, amid the fighting near Sapele, Ogoja's crew rescued the military governor of Mid-Western State David Ejoor.. She also participated in the recapturing of Sapele and Warri by federal forces.

In Operation Tiger Claw in October, Ogoja led a small flotilla that landed troops at Calabar, where she again bombarded targets on land. She was also involved in the March 1968 Invasion of Port Harcourt that resulted in the capture of Oron and Port Harcourt by Nigerian federal forces, during which Ogoja was damaged by a Biafran remote-controlled mine on the last day of March;

Ogoja led all of the Nigerian Navy's combat operations against Biafran forces, as the flagship frigate Nigeria was too large to operate in the riverine environment of the Niger Delta and because it was thought that the loss of Nigeria in combat against Biafra would be too damaging to Nigerian prestige. After the riverine cities and towns were captured by federal forces and fighting moved further afield, Ogoja again saw duty enforcing the Nigerian Navy's blockade of Biafra's inland waters. On 25 October 1969, Ogoja's naval career came to an end when she ran aground two miles off the lighthouse at the mouth of the Nun River at Akassa and was abandoned.
