= India–Kenya relations =

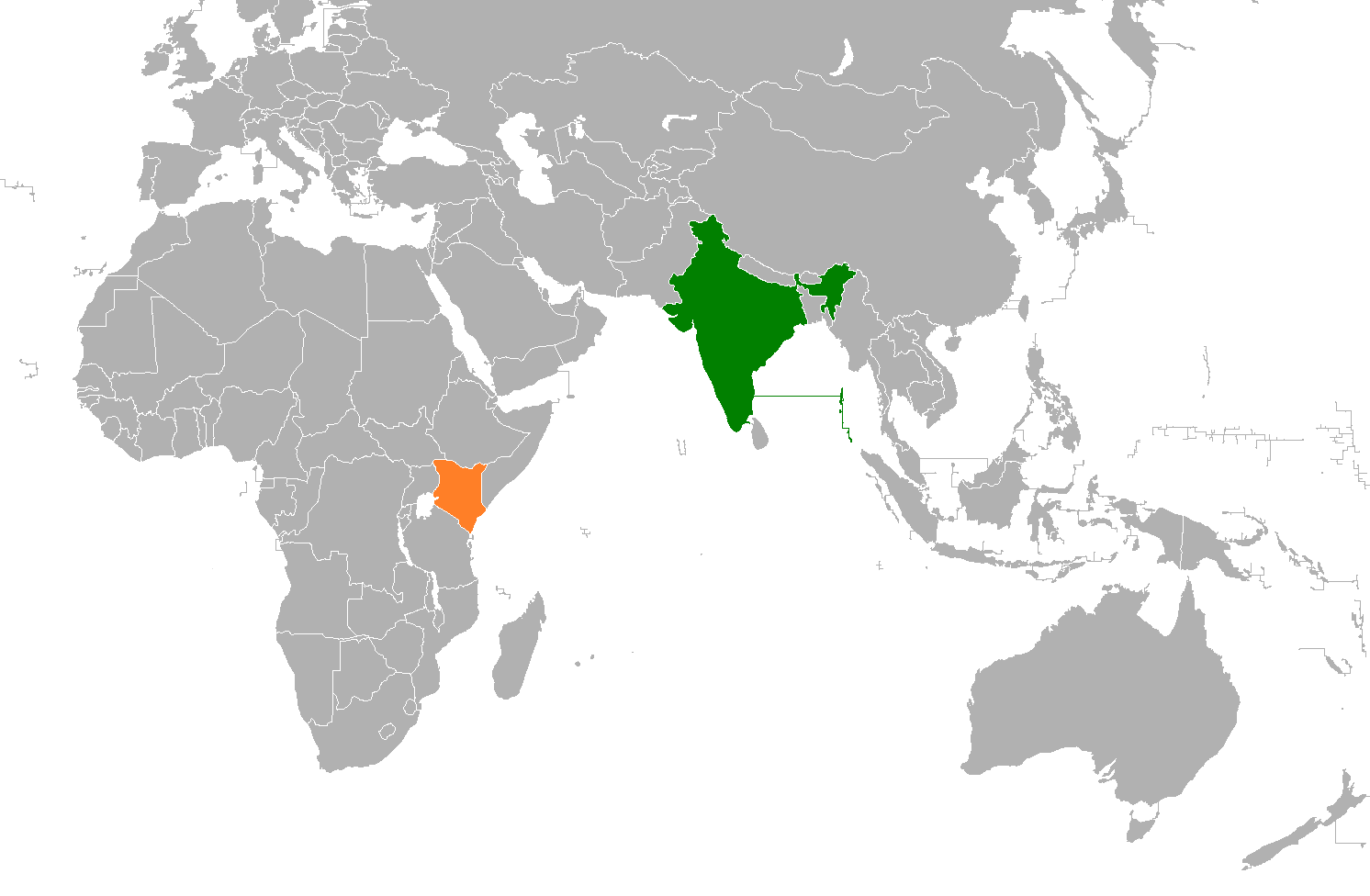
- India: Kenya

India–Kenya relations are bilateral diplomatic relations between the Republic of India and the Republic of Kenya.

== History ==
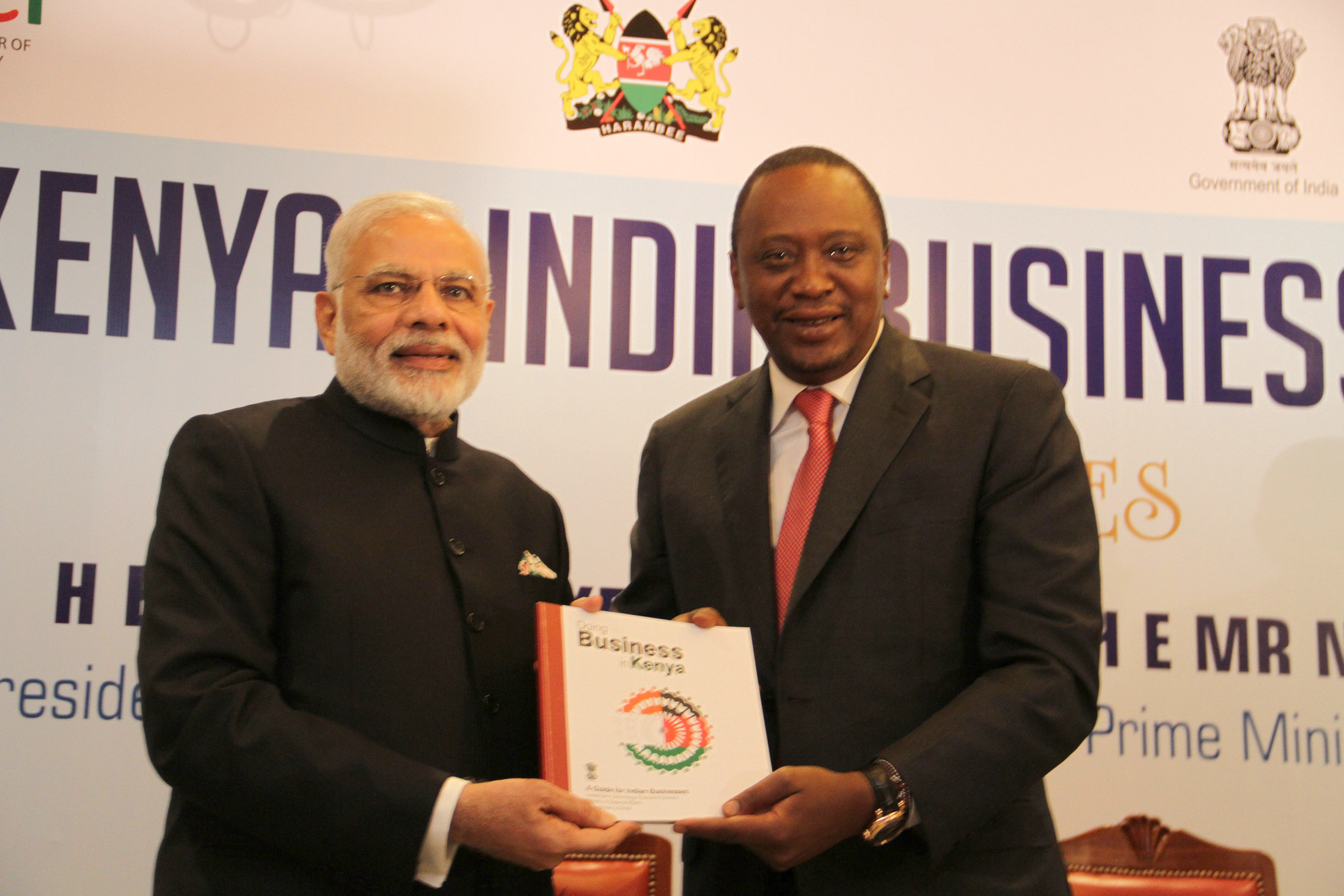
Kenyan President Uhuru Kenyatta along with Indian Prime Minister Narendra Modi who was on an official visit to Kenya; 2016.

As littoral states of the Indian Ocean, trade links and commercial ties between India and Kenya go back several centuries. Kenya has a large minority of Indians and Persons of Indian Origin living there who are descendants of labourers who were brought in by the British to construct the Uganda Railway. Prior to India's independence, the welfare of Indians in Southeast Africa gained the attention of Indian freedom fighters. Sarojini Naidu chaired the Mombasa session of the East African Indian Congress in 1924 and a fact-finding mission under K.P.S. Menon was sent there in 1934. After India's independence, it established an Office of the Commissioner for British East Africa resident in Nairobi in 1948. Given deteriorating race relations between Indians and Kenyans, Jawaharlal Nehru appointed the senior diplomat Apa Pant as High Commissioner to Kenya. Nehru also gave support to Jomo Kenyatta and the Kenya African National Union party, asking Indians in Kenya to identify themselves with the locals. Despite worsening race relations in Kenya that led to the exodus of Asians there to India and Britain, economic cooperation between India and Kenya flourished and became an exemplar of South-South cooperation. Following Kenyan independence in 1963, an Indian High Commission was established in Nairobi

Kenya and India are members of international fora like United Nations, Non-Aligned Movement, Commonwealth of Nations, G-77 and G-15 and the Indian Ocean Rim Association for Regional Cooperation and often cooperate with each other on these fora.

== Economic ties ==
India and Kenya have growing trade and commercial ties. Bilateral trade amounted to $2.4 billion in 2010–2011 but with Kenyan imports from India accounting for $2.3 billion, the balance of trade was heavily in India's favour. India is Kenya's sixth largest trading partner and the largest exporter to Kenya. Indian exports to Kenya include pharmaceuticals, steel, machinery and automobiles while Kenyan exports to India are largely primary commodities such as soda ash, vegetables and tea. Indian companies have a significant presence in Kenya with Indian corporates like the Tata Group, Essar, Reliance Industries and Bharti Airtel operating there. The Indian public sector banks Bank of Baroda and Bank of India have operations in Kenya. Kenya has been trying to promote itself as a tourist destination in India. However air connectivity between the two countries is limited and is provided by Kenya Airways between Mumbai and Delhi to Nairobi. Services to Nairobi, which was Air India's second international destination, begun in 1951 was finally shut down by the airline in 2010. However, Air India has restarted flights on the Mumbai-Nairobi route since November 2019.

== Technical cooperation ==
India offers 101 fully funded scholarships for Kenyans annually under its Indian Technical and Economic Cooperation Programme for training them in technical skills. The Exim Bank of India has provided Kenya with a loan of $61 million for overhauling its national power grid. India's Pan-African e-Network project seeks to make available teleeducation and telemedicine facilities to African countries including Kenya. Indian investments in Kenya are now worth $1.5 billion and India's pharmaceutical exports have played a key role in making essential drugs available at affordable prices in Kenya.

== Covid-19 crisis ==
In March 2021, India gave one hundred thousand Covid-19 vaccines to Kenya on grant. Kenya donated 12 tonnes of tea, coffee and nuts to India for Covid-19 relief efforts during India's second wave Covid-19 crisis.

== Defence ==
The Indian Navy has been actively fostering maritime excellence with Kenya Navy through training endeavours since 1990.

On 25 September, the First Training Squadron (1TS) ships called at the Mombasa, Kenya. On 28 September, the fleet departed and conducted PASSEX with KNS Shupavu (P3130) of the Kenya Navy.

Major General Paul Owuor Otieno, Commander of the Kenya Navy, along with a four member delegation, visited Southern Naval Command (SNC), Kochi from September 30 – October 2 2025 as part of his official visit to India. In sidelines, he met with Vice Admiral V Srinivas. In the deliberations, Major General Otieno appreciated the Indian Navy’s maiden initiative Indian Ocean Ship – Sagar (IOS Sagar), jointly crewed by personnel from nine IOR nations including Kenya.The recent long-range training deployment of the First Training Squadron (1TS) to Mombasa was also noted as a significant milestone in bilateral ties. The Kenyan delegation visited various training schools at SNC and witnessed demonstrations on advanced simulators and state-of-the-art training infrastructure. At Headquarters Sea Training, discussions focused on operational sea training and avenues for deeper training cooperation. A visit to INS Kabra was also undertaken. At the Naval hospital INHS Sanjivani, the delegation was briefed on the wide range of multi-speciality medical facilities available.

INS Trikand, a frigate of Indian Navy was on a port call at Mombasa in between April 7 – 10. The visit, accompanied by that of Vice Admiral K. Swaminathan and is aligned with India’s MAHASAGAR (Mutual and Holistic Advancement for Security and Growth Across Regions) which underscores India’s commitment to strengthening maritime partnerships with African nations. The visit also saw the signing of an Implementing Arrangement under a Quick Impact Project (QIP) for provision of a 1.5 Tesla MRI machine to the Kenya Defence Forces, as well as the handover of 100 INSAS rifles and 50,000 rounds of ammunition. The visit concluded with a Passage Exercise (PASSEX) between INS Trikand and a Kenya Navy ship. Vice Admiral Swaminathan and Dr. Adarsh Swaika, High Commissioner of India to Kenya met General Charles Kahariri, Chief of the Defence Forces of Kenya and Dr. Patrick Mariru, Principal Secretary for Defence in Nairobi. Vice Admiral Swaminathan also held discussions with Major General Paul Otieno, Commander of the Kenya Navy, in Mombasa while Deputy Governors of Kilifi and Taita Taveta were present.

== Sports ==
Football Kenya Federation hosted Indian women's national football team in Nairobi for 2026 four-nation FIFA Series to play two matches against Harambee Starlets and Scorchers (Malawi) in Nyayo National Stadium. High Commission of India in Nairobi hosted the Indian side at India House with members of Indian diaspora in Kenya.

== Resident diplomatic missions ==
- India has a High Commission in Nairobi and maintains an Assistant High Commission in Mombasa.
- Kenya has a High Commission in New Delhi.

== See also ==
- Indians in Kenya
- Hinduism in Kenya
