= JCJ =

JCJ may refer to:

- J. C. J. Kimaro, commander of the Kenyan Navy
- JCJ Architecture, formerly Jeter, Cook & Jepson, an architecture firm; see Foxwoods Resort Casino
- JCJ Vanderheyden (1928–2012), Dutch painter and photographer
- Jean-Claude Juncker (born 1954), Luxembourgish prime minister and president of the European Commission
- Journal of Criminal Justice, a bimonthly peer-reviewed academic journal
