= Eliud (name) =

Eliud is a male given name which may refer to:

- Eliud, legendary king of the Britons
- Eliud (biblical figure), ancestor of Jesus in the Bible
- Saint Eliud, British Christian monk and bishop
- Eliud Poligrates (born 1987), Filipino basketball player
- Eliud Williams (born 1948), former President of Dominica
- Eliud Zeledón (born 1983), Nicaraguan international footballer

== Kenyans ==
- Eliud Wabukala (born 1951), Kenyan Anglican Archbishop
- Eliud Wambu Mathu (born 1910), first African to sit on Kenya's Legislative Council
- Eliud Mbilu (born 1942), Major General of the Kenyan Navy
- Eliud Barngetuny (born 1973), Kenyan steeplechase runner
- Eliud Kipchoge (born 1984), Kenyan distance runner and former world champion
- Eliud Kiptanui (born 1989), Kenyan marathon runner
- Eliud Kirui (born 1975), Kenyan cross country runner
- Eliud Owalo, Kenyan government minister

== See also ==
- List of biblical names starting with E
