= HMS Gifford =

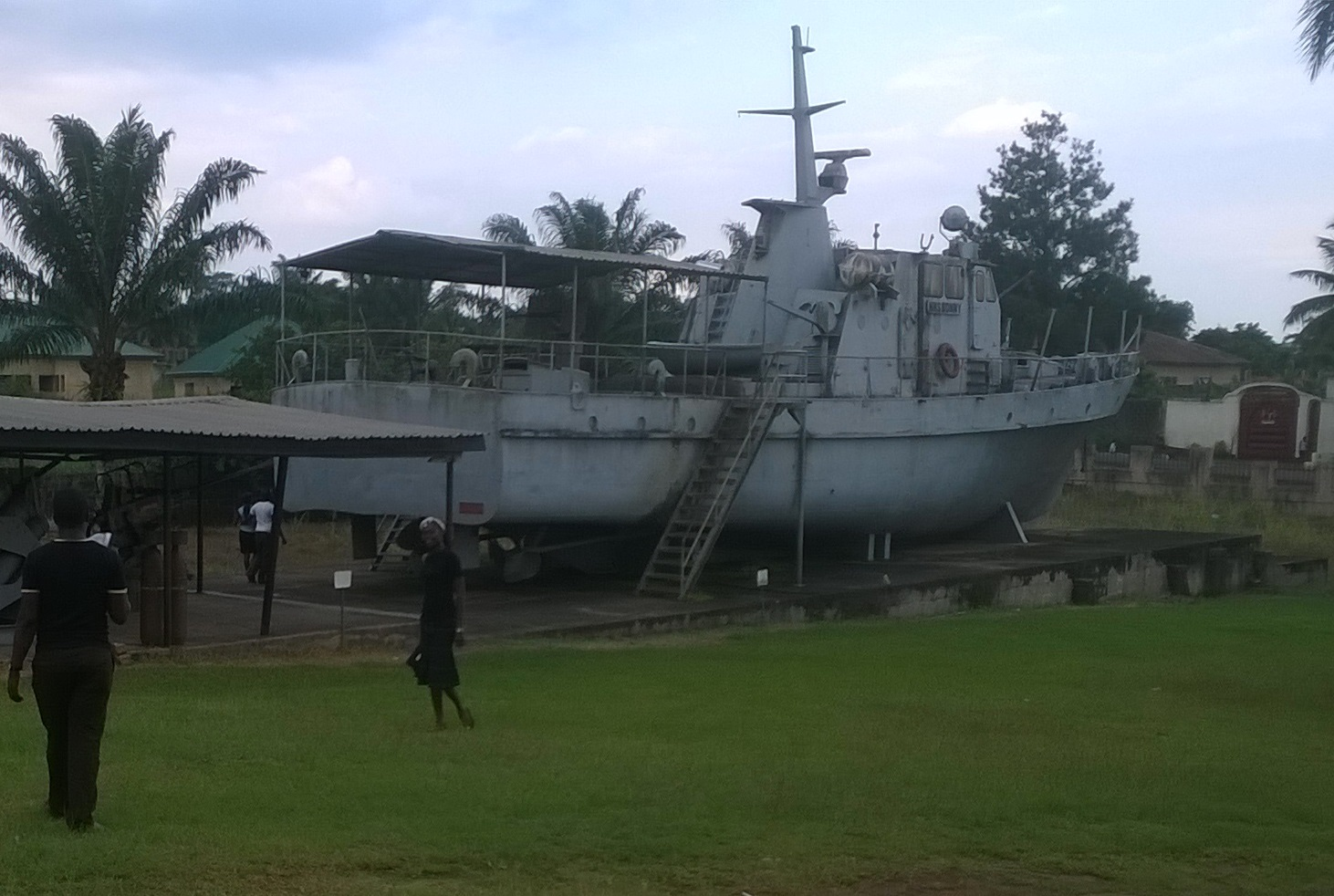
- The NNS Bonny at the Nigerian War Museum

History

United Kingdom
- Name: HMS Gifford
- Builder: Scarr
- Launched: 30 June 1954
- Commissioned: 30 June 1954
- Identification: Pennant number: P3111
- Fate: Sold in 1968 to Nigeria

Nigeria
- Name: NNS Bonny
- Acquired: 1968
- Decommissioned: 1983
- Status: Museum ship

General characteristics
- Class & type: Ford-class seaward defence boat
- Displacement: 120 tons standard; 160 tons full load
- Length: 117 ft 3 in (35.74 m)
- Beam: 20 ft (6.1 m)
- Draught: 6 ft 6 in (1.98 m)
- Propulsion: 1 × Foden diesel (centre shaft); 2 × Paxman 12YHAX 550 hp (410 kW) diesels (outer shafts)
- Speed: 20 knots (37 km/h; 23 mph)
- Armament: 1 × Bofors 40 mm gun; 2 × Oerlikon 20 mm cannon

HMS Gifford was one of 23 boats of the Ford class of patrol boats built for the Royal Navy in the 1950s. Gifford was launched on 30 June 1954. In 1968 the vessel was sold to Nigeria and renamed NNS Bonny. Bonny took part in the Nigerian Civil War and was decommissioned in 1983. Bonny is preserved at the Nigerian War Museum in Umuahia.

== Service history ==
Gifford was a Ford-class seaward defence boat constructed for the Royal Navy. The names of the class ships were all chosen from villages ending in "-ford". This boat was named after Gifford. (Note: There are several places in UK whose name contains or consists of Gifford. It is unclear which one the name givers had in mind.) She was launched on 30 June 1954 and sold to Nigeria in 1968. Renamed NNS Bonny, she fought in the Nigerian Civil War against Biafra. She was decommissioned in 1983.

== Museum ship ==
NNS Bonny is preserved in the Nigerian War Museum at Umuahia as a museum exhibit.
