= Stenka-class patrol boat =

Soviet patrol boat class

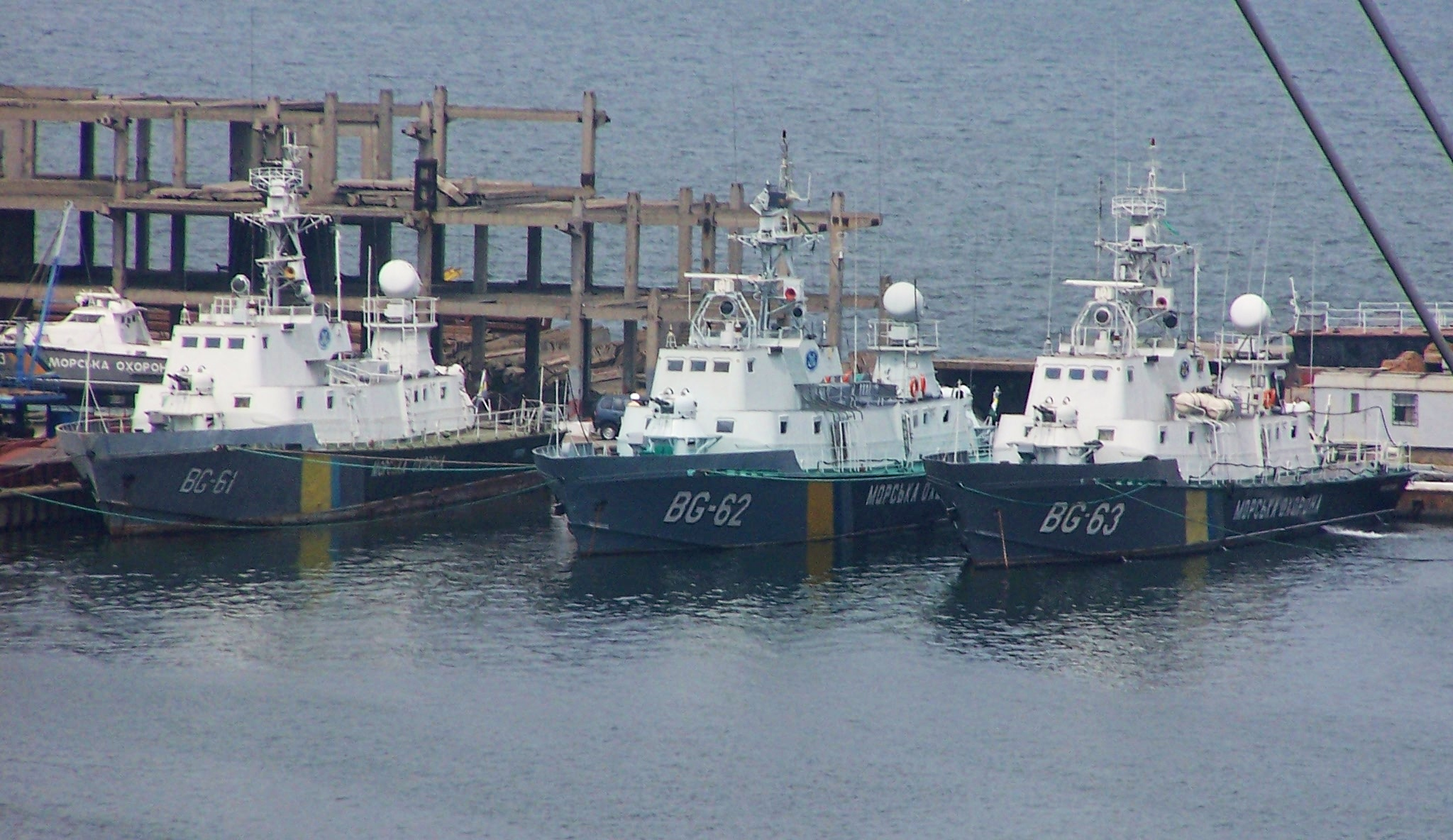

Class overview
- Name: Project 205P Tarantul
- Builders: Almaz Shipyard; Vladivostok Shipyard
- Operators: see below
- Built: 1967–1989
- In service: 1967–present
- Completed: c. 137 (including the export Project 02059)
- Lost: 1

General characteristics (Project 205P)
- Type: Patrol boat
- Displacement: 211 t (208 long tons; 233 short tons) standard; 245 t (241 long tons; 270 short tons) full load
- Length: 39.98 m (131 ft 2 in)
- Beam: 7.91 m (25 ft 11 in)
- Draught: 1.96 m (6 ft 5 in)
- Installed power: 3 × 4,000 metric horsepower (3,900 hp) or 3 × 5,000 metric horsepower (4,900 hp)
- Propulsion: 3 × Zvezda M503 or M504 diesel engines; three shafts
- Speed: 34 knots (63 km/h; 39 mph) for boats with Zvezda M503 engines; 36 knots (67 km/h; 41 mph) for boats with Zvezda M504 engines
- Range: 1,910 nmi (3,540 km; 2,200 mi) at 11.4 kn (21.1 km/h; 13.1 mph); 1,560 nmi (2,890 km; 1,800 mi) at 12.3 kn (22.8 km/h; 14.2 mph); 800 nmi (1,500 km; 920 mi) at 20 kn (37 km/h; 23 mph)
- Complement: 31
- Sensors & processing systems: 1 × 4Ts-30-125 or MR-220 ("Peel Cone") search radar; 1 × Xenon navigational radar; 1 × Bronza search system (hull-mounted and dipping high-frequency sonars)
- Armament: 2 × twin 30 mm AK-230 guns; 4 × 40 cm anti-submarine torpedo tubes; Two depth charge racks (12 depth charges)

The Stenka class is the NATO reporting name for a class of patrol boats built for the Soviet Navy, KGB Border Troops and Soviet Allies. The official Soviet designation was Project 205P Tarantul (not to be confused with the Tarantul-class corvette). The boats are an anti-submarine patrol version of the Osa-class missile boat.

== Design ==
The Stenka class (Project 205P) is a variant of the Osa-class missile boat (Project 205). The Stenkas used the hull of the Osa class and had a slightly larger crew. The development office of the Almaz Shipyard in Leningrad used the standardized components of the Osa class, in order to develop an anti-submarine warfare (ASW) boat. The anti-ship missile launch containers were replaced by four torpedo tubes but the anti-ship missile related structures and equipment were retained. The living spaces in the Stenkas were improved for long patrol endurance by raising the superstructure in order to create more usable space inside, compared to the Osa class. They also installed a more powerful air conditioner.

The drive system is three diesel radial engines of the Zvezda M503 or M504 series with a total capacity of 12,000 metric horsepower (11,800 hp) or 15,000 metric horsepower (14,800 hp).

=== Armament ===
The primary anti-submarine weapon for destroying submarines were SET-40 torpedoes. The boats have four 400 mm (16 in) torpedo tubes installed on the deck in the aft part of the boats, two on the port side and two on starboard side.

Behind the torpedo tubes on the aft deck, in the port and starboard sides, are each one depth charge rack. Twelve depth charges, six for each rack can be carried.

As the Osa-class boats (Project 205), the Stenka-class boats (Project 205P) has two radar-controlled 30 mm AK-230 guns in twin mounts, one in the bow, the other at the rear.

One of the boats was tested with a 57 mm AK-725 gun on the bow and received a modified project number – 205PE.

=== Sensors ===
The 4Ts-30-125 or later MR-220 (NATO reporting name "Peel Cone") radar is a shipboard air and surface search radar mounted on the mast with two antennas for the friend or foe identification system ("High Pole B"). The MR-104 ("Drum Tilt") fire-control radar is mounted on the rear of the superstructure for directing the fire of the two AK-230 guns. The MG-345 Bronza submarine search system on the ships consists of the MG-329 Sheksna dipping sonar with the MG-11 Tamir-11 sonar sensor mounted in the hull.

== Ships ==
=== Soviet Union and post-Soviet states ===
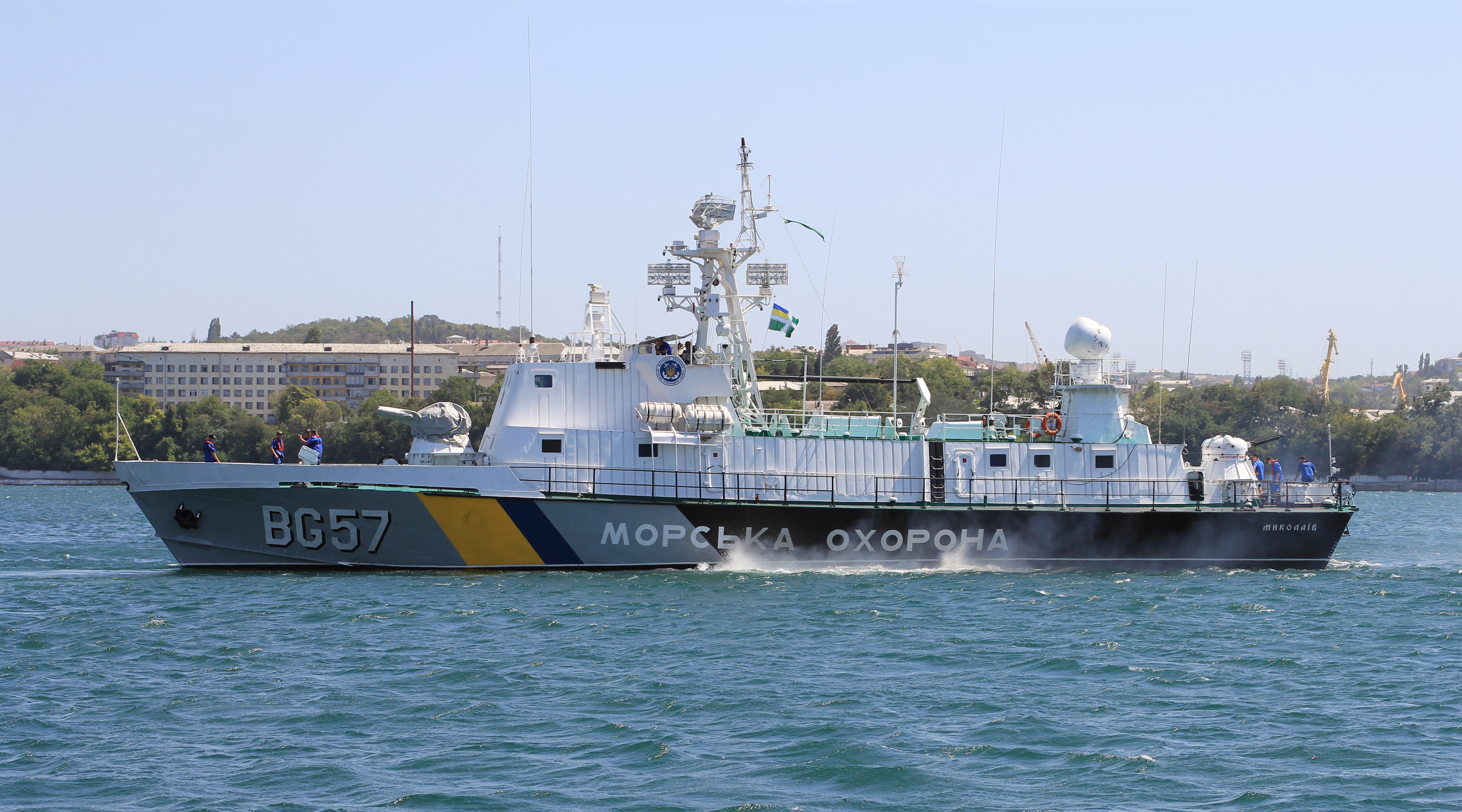
The Ukrainian Sea Guard ship BG57 Mykolaiv (torpedo tubes and depth charge racks were removed), 2012

A total of c. 130 boats were built between 1967 and 1989. Most of them were operated by the KGB Maritime Border Guard.

The Soviet Union classified the boats of their border troops as "border patrol ships" (Russian: ПСКР, romanized: PSKR, an initialism for пограничный сторожевой корабль, pogranichniy storozhevoy korabl') and the four boats in the Navy as gunboats (Russian: артиллерийский катер). A similar allocation of boats for submarine patrol are assigned into the border guards, which is rather unusual in NATO countries, and so the Project 205P patrol boat identification is used.

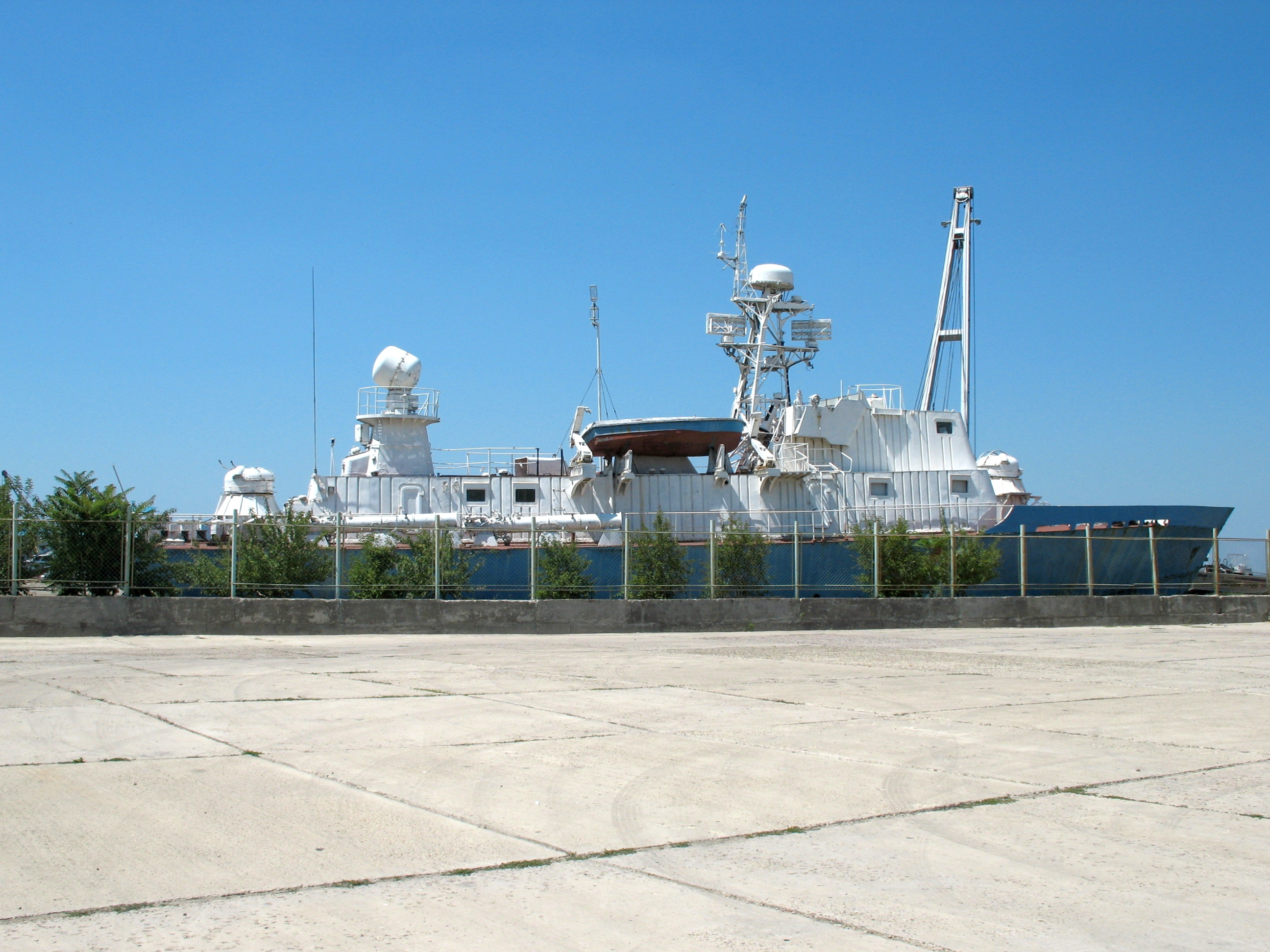
A Russian Coast Guard Stenka-class border patrol ship (starboard torpedo tubes are visible), 2007

- Russian Navy – 1 boat was used until 2001 (Note: Two out of the four Soviet Navy Stenka-class gunboats were transferred to Azerbaijan in 1992 and another one was decommissioned in the same year.) (subsequently, c. 13 survivors were operated by the Russian Coast Guard until 2017).
- Azerbaijan Navy – 4 boats.
- Ukrainian Navy – 17 boats (few still operated by the Ukrainian Sea Guard).
- Georgian Navy – 2 boats (1 – Batumi was scrapped in 2006, another – Giorgi Toreli sunk in the Battle off the coast of Abkhazia).

=== Export ===
The Project 02059 gunboats are an export version of the Stenka-class patrol boat.

- Cuban Navy – 4 boats exported in 1985.
- Royal Cambodian Navy (formerly the Kampuchean Navy) – 4 boats transferred 1985–1987. Rearmed with twin Bofors 40 mm L/60 guns forward and ZU-23-2 aft, replacing the AK-230 turrets. Torpedo tubes removed.

== See also ==
- List of ships of the Soviet Navy
- List of ships of Russia by project number

Equivalent patrol vessels of the same era

- Balder class
- Ford class
