= NNS Obuma =

Nigerian frigate vessel

History

Nigeria
- Name: Obuma
- Cost: £3,500,000
- Laid down: 9 April 1964
- Launched: 12 April 1965
- Commissioned: 16 September 1966
- Identification: F87
- Fate: Training hulk

General characteristics
- Class & type: Frigate
- Displacement: 1,724 t (1,696.8 long tons; 1,900.4 short tons) (standard); 2,000 t (1,968.4 long tons; 2,204.6 short tons) (full load)
- Length: 341 ft 2 in (104.0 m)
- Beam: 37 ft (11.3 m)
- Draught: 11 ft 5 in (3.5 m)
- Propulsion: 4x MAN Diesels
- Speed: 26 kn (48.2 km/h; 29.9 mph)
- Range: 3,500 nmi (6,482.0 km; 4,027.7 mi)
- Complement: 216
- Sensors & processing systems: Type 293 search radar
- Armament: 1 × twin 102 mm guns; 3 × single 40 mm guns; 1 × Squid mortar

NNS Obuma, formerly NNS Nigeria, was a Nigerian frigate which served as the flagship of the Nigerian Navy from 1965 to 1982. It is presently a hulk stationed at the Nigerian Navy College of Engineering.

== Background and construction ==
The Nigerian government ordered the frigate Nigeria as a purpose-built flagship from Wilton-Fijenoord in the Netherlands at a cost of £3,500,000. This was part of an expansion practice which sought to use new ships to balance out the Nigerian Navy's older acquisitions and give the force seagoing capabilities. The Dutch Ministry of Defence loaned the Nigerian Navy another ship, NNS Ogoja, pending the completion of the Nigeria, until it eventually decided to gift the Ogoja to the navy in October 1965.

Nigeria was laid down on 9 April 1964 and launched on 12 April 1965. It began performing sea trials with an all-Nigerian crew later that year. It was designed for a complement of 216 crew.

== Service ==
The Nigeria formally entered service on 16 September 1966 with pennant number F87. Following the outbreak of the Nigerian Civil War in 1967, the Nigerian Navy was tasked with blockading the coast of the secessionist Republic of Biafra. Nigeria was moored in an estuary near Port Harcourt early on in the conflict. In July 1967, Biafran leader C. Odumegwu Ojukwu ordered mercenary Jan Zumbach of the Biafran Air Force to attack the ship to prevent it from cutting off the port to the sea. Zumbach flew a Douglas A-26 Invader with a Douglas DC-3 providing support in an early morning raid. Zumbach dropped his payload and strafed the ship while the DC-3 dropped two small bombs. The first bomb landed off the stern while the second exploded to the ship's port, splashing water over the decks and causing the crew to run for cover. The two aircraft rearmed in Enugu and made a second attack. The bombs missed again, but as a result the Nigeria raised its anchor and moved out into the ocean.

Several weeks after the air raids the ship moved to the mouth of the Bonny River, where it ensured Port Harcourt was cut off from the sea. Too large to operate in Nigeria's rivers, Nigeria served as a guide for smaller ships making their way to the fairway buoy at the mouth of the Bonny, and most naval operations during the war were instead led by the Ogoja. Under the command of Captain Nelson Bossman Soroh, the larger frigate lent its support to bombardment operations at Port Harcourt, Bonny, Calabar, Warri, and other areas.

Nigeria was refitted by Cammell Laird from 1970 to 1971, and again by Wilton-Fijenoord in 1977. The ship was renamed Obuma in 1981, meaning "thunder" in the Igbo language. It was replaced as the fleet flagship by NNS Aradu in 1982. In 1983 it was due to be modernized and have its 102 mm gun mount replaced with an OTO Melara 76 mm, but this was delayed indefinitely. It participated in joint exercises with visiting Brazilian vessels in 1986. By the late 1980s, the ship was reduced to a dockside training hulk, and its helicopter pad was primarily used for ceremonies. By 2020 the hulk served as part of the training facilities at the Nigerian Navy College of Engineering in Sapele.

== Works cited ==
- Moore, John, ed. (1979). Jane's Fighting Ships 1978–79. London: Jane's. ISBN 0-531-03297-3.
- Prézelin, Bernard, ed. (1993). The Naval Institute Guide to Combat Fleets of the World 1993. Annapolis: Naval Institute Press. ISBN 9781557501042.
- Raji, Ba (2014). Memoir of an Executive Admiral. Partridge Africa. ISBN 9781482803150.
- Venter, Al J. (2016). Biafra's War 1967–1970 : A Tribal Conflict in Nigeria That Left a Million Dead. Helion & Company. ISBN 9781910294697.
- Waters, Conrad (2020). Seaforth World Naval Review: 2021. Seaforth Publishing. ISBN 9781526790774.
