= Balder-class patrol vessel =

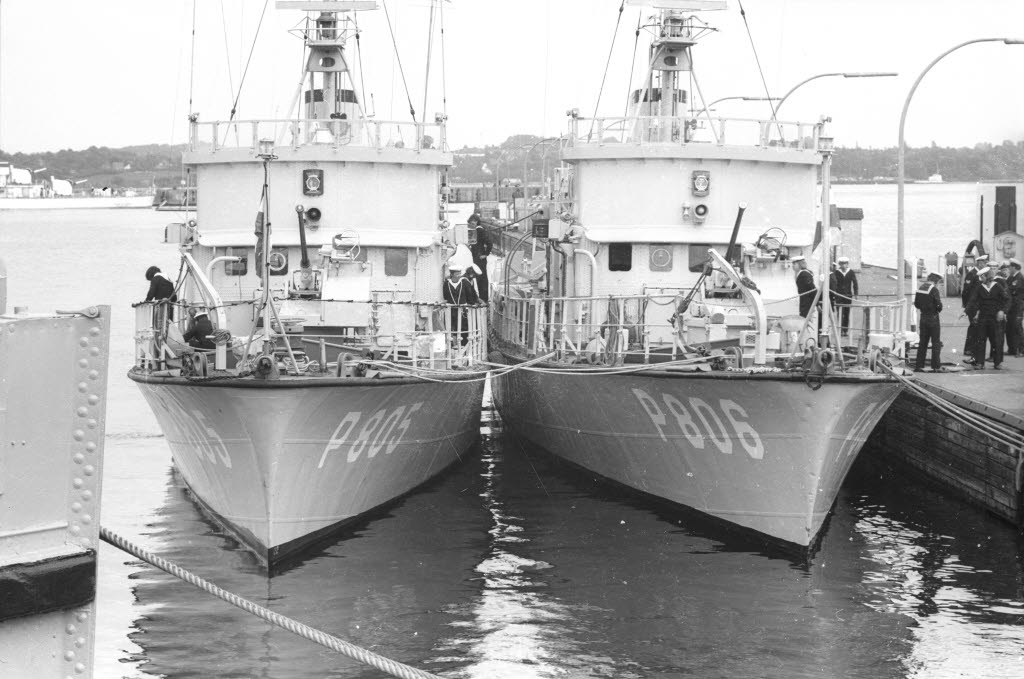
- Hadda and Hefring

Class overview
- Name: Balder class
- Builders: Rijkswerf Willemsoord, Den Helder
- Operators: Royal Netherlands Navy
- Built: 1953-1955
- In commission: 1954-1986
- Planned: 16
- Completed: 5
- Canceled: 11

General characteristics
- Type: Patrol vessel
- Displacement: 169 t (166 long tons)
- Length: 36.3 m (119 ft 1 in)
- Beam: 6.2 m (20 ft 4 in)
- Draft: 1.9 metres (6 ft 3 in)
- Propulsion: 2 propellers; 1,300 hp (970 kW); Diesel engines
- Speed: 15.5 knots (28.7 km/h; 17.8 mph)
- Crew: 27
- Armament: 1 x 40 mm machine gun; 3 x 20 mm machine guns; 2 x Depth charge racks; 2 x Depth charge throwers; 3 x Depth charge chutes

The Balder-class patrol vessels were a class of five patrol vessels built for the Royal Netherlands Navy in the 1950s at the Rijkswerf in Willemsoord, Den Helder. They were paid for by the United States under the Mutual Defense Assistance Program (MDAP). The ships were used to patrol the Dutch coast and waterways.

== History ==
The construction of the Balder-class patrol vessels was paid for by the United States under the Mutual Defense Assistance Program (MDAP). Initially the Netherlands wanted to build 16 ships, but since the United States only wanted to pay for the construction of a maximum of five ships it was decided to only build five ships. The five ships of the Balder-class were constructed at the Rijkswerf in Willemsoord, Den Helder.

== Service history ==
The Balder-class vessels were used to patrol the Dutch coast and waterways. Furthermore, they were also used to inspect fishing vessels and enforce fishing rules and laws in Dutch territorial waters. In wartime the ships could escort small convoys near the Dutch coast. After the retirement of the Balder-class patrol vessels in the 1980s most tasks related to the inspection of fishing vessels and enforcement of fishing rules and laws was transferred from the Royal Netherlands Navy to the newly established Netherlands Coastguard.

== Ships in class ==
The vessels in this class were named after the gods in Norse mythology.

Balder-class construction data
Ship	Pennant No.	Laid down	Launched	Commissioned	Decommissioned	Fate
Balder	P802	12 September 1953	24 February 1954	6 August 1954	1 January 1985	Sold for scrap in 1985 to Simmeren Schroot B.V.
Bulgia	P803	10 October 1953	24 April 1954	9 August 1954		Between 1986 and 1996 the Bulgia was used as training ship by the Koninklijk Instituut voor de Marine (KIM).
Freyr	P804	24 February 1954	21 July 1954	1 December 1954	28 November 1986	Loaned to ZKK Gouda in 1987.
Hadda	P805	24 April 1954	2 October 1954	3 February 1955		Sold for scrap in 1990 to the firm Westmetaal.
Hefring	P806	21 July 1954	1 December 1954	23 March 1955	1 January 1985	Sold for scrap in 1985 in Groningen.

== See also ==
Equivalent patrol vessels of the same era

- Stenka class
- Ford class
