= HMS Aberford =

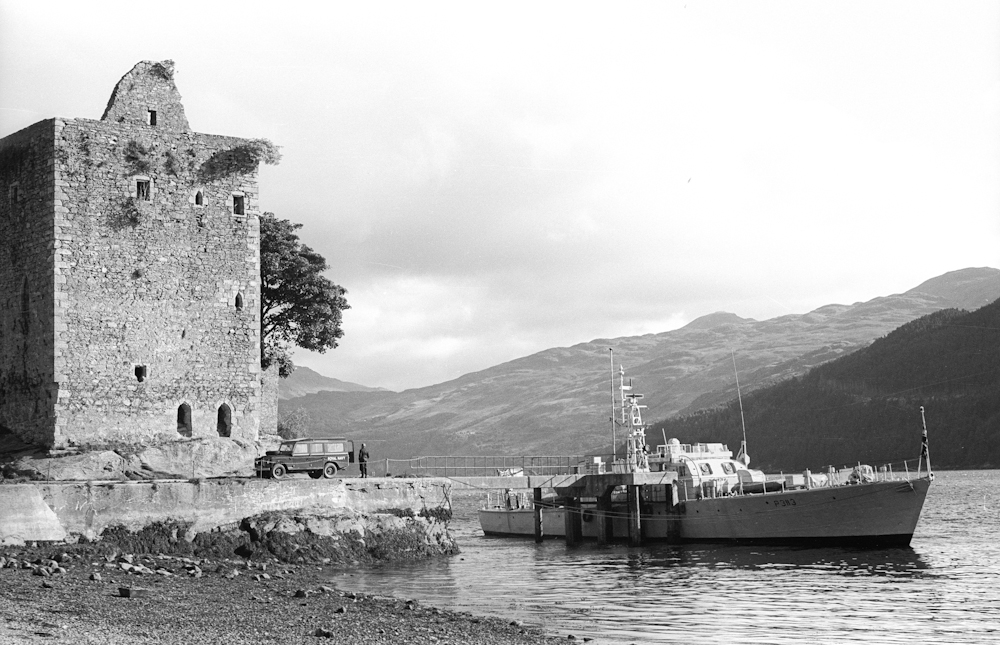
- HMS Droxford, another Ford-class patrol boat

History

United Kingdom
- Name: HMS Aberford (P3102)
- Operator: Royal Navy
- Builder: Yarrow
- Launched: 23 September 1952
- Fate: Sold 27 October 1964 to Kenya.

Kenya
- Name: KNS Nyati
- Operator: Kenya Navy
- Acquired: 16 December 1964
- Fate: Sold for scrapping 1971.

General characteristics
- Class & type: Ford class seaward defence boat
- Displacement: 120 tons standard; 160 tons full load
- Length: 117 ft 3 in (35.74 m)
- Beam: 20 ft (6.1 m)
- Draught: 6 ft 6 in (1.98 m)
- Propulsion: 1 × Foden diesel (Centre shaft); 2 × Paxman 12YHAX 550hp Diesels (Outer shafts)
- Speed: 20 knots (37 km/h; 23 mph)
- Complement: 19
- Armament: 1 × 40 mm anti-aircraft gun; 2 × 20 mm anti aircraft guns

HMS Aberford was one of 20 boats of the Ford class of patrol boats built for the Royal Navy in the 1950s.

Their names were all chosen from villages ending in -ford. This boat was named after Aberford, West Yorkshire.

The Kenya Navy was granted Aberford as a gift following independence and the formation of the Navy. She was renamed KNS (for Kenya Navy Ship) Nyati, and was the first ship in the Kenyan Navy. She was withdrawn and laid up in the late 1960s off the Southern Engineering yard in Mbaraki Creek in Mombasa and eventually beached and scrapped in 1975.
