= J. C. J. Kimaro =

Kenyan military personnel (died 1978)

Lieutenant Colonel J. C. J. Kimaro was the first Kenyan to command the Kenya Navy, replacing Royal Navy officer Commander W. A. E. Hall in 1972. He was killed in a car accident in 1978.
