= Kenya Navy =

Naval branch of Kenya Defence Forces

Kenyan Navy
- Jeshi la Wanamaji
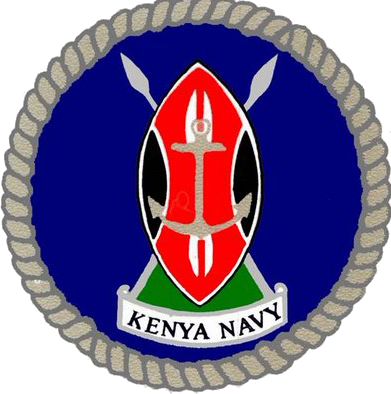
- Emblem of the Kenya Navy
- Founded: 1964; 62 years ago
- Country: Kenya
- Type: Navy
- Part of: Kenya Defence Forces
- Command Headquarters: Mombasa, Kenya
- Motto: Ujasiri Baharini
- Engagements: Operation Linda Nchi (2011-12): African Union Mission in Somalia

Commanders
- Commander-in-Chief: President William Ruto
- Commander, Kenya Navy: Major General Paul Owuor Otieno

Insignia
- Naval ensign

- Presidential colour

The Kenya Navy is the naval branch of the Kenya Defence Forces. It is headquartered in Mombasa.

Kenya Navy has two major bases for its fleet with it being headquartered in Mtongwe Naval Base, Mombasa and Manda Bay (part of Lamu Archipelago) being the second naval base. The navy also operates naval stations in Shimoni, Msambweni, Malindi and Kilifi. The Kenya Navy fleet is organised into two fighting squadrons and a logistical support squadron, namely the pioneer 66 Squadron, the 76 Squadron and the 86 Squadron all supported by a Special Operations Squadron, the Fleet Maintenance Unit and a recently formed elite Marine Commando Unit, modelled after the United Kingdom Royal Marines.

== History ==
As Great Britain wound down her colonial control in East Africa, the Royal East African Navy (REAN) was established in 1953, covering Kenya Colony, Tanganyika and Zanzibar. Following the disbanding of the REAN in 1962, the East African Railways and Harbours Corporation assumed control of naval operations in the former colonies until the independent states were ready to establish their own navies. The Kenyan Navy was established on 12 December 1964, exactly one year after Kenya gained independence.

In 1976, the Second Squadron, made up of the missile boats KNS Madaraka, KNS Jamhuri and KNS Harambee left Portsmouth to sail to Kenya, arriving later that year. In late August 1976, during the delivery voyage, the U.S. Embassy in Nairobi was approached to request assistance for two of the patrol boats, off the Somali coast and not having "enough fuel to reach Mombasa."

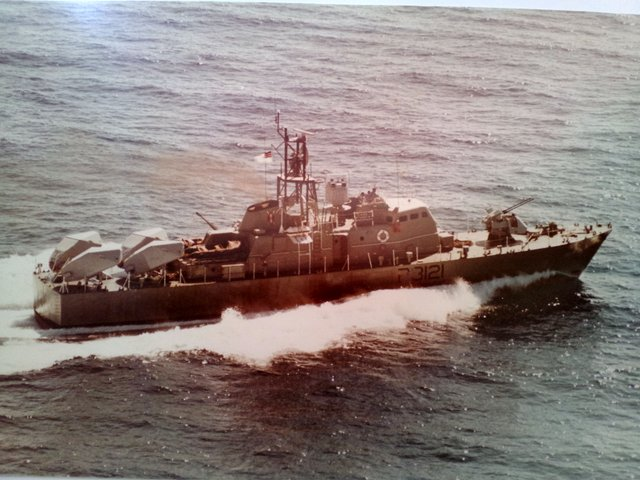
KNS Madaraka out at sea

In 1972, Major JCJ Kimaro was promoted to lieutenant colonel by President Jomo Kenyatta and appointed as the first commander of the Kenyan Navy. He died in a road accident in 1978 and Major General Eliud Mbilu took over command until his retirement in 1988 when Brigadier Joseph Kibwana was promoted to major general.

In 2010 it was reported that the United States Navy Naval Special Warfare Group 4 was assisting the creation of a new Kenyan Special Boat Unit within the Kenya Navy.

On 4 September 2012 the Kenyan Navy shelled the Somali city of Kismayo. This was part of an African Union offensive to capture the city from al-Shabab fighters during the War in Somalia. The harbour was shelled twice and the airport three times. According to a UN report the export of charcoal through Kismayo is a major source of income for al-Shabab.

== Special Operations Squadron ==
The Kenya Navy at the turn of the 21st Century took keen interest at developing specialised units within its ranks to handle emerging threats such as terrorism, drug running and piracy. This led to the establishment of a Special Operations Squadron (SOS) to provide an entity similar to the Army Special Operations Brigade, that is to provide a unified command structure for its various special units.

The Special Boat Unit (SBU) was built up with assistance from the U.S. Navy through its Special Warfare Combatant-craft Crewmen (SWCC) personnel in 2010 and continues to enjoy joint training exercises with the U.S. military. It is tasked with predominantly patrolling the northern coastline near the Somali border at Kiunga and is based at the revamped Manda Naval Base near Lamu. They are known to possess Defender-Class response boats for rapid high seas interdictions and patrols.

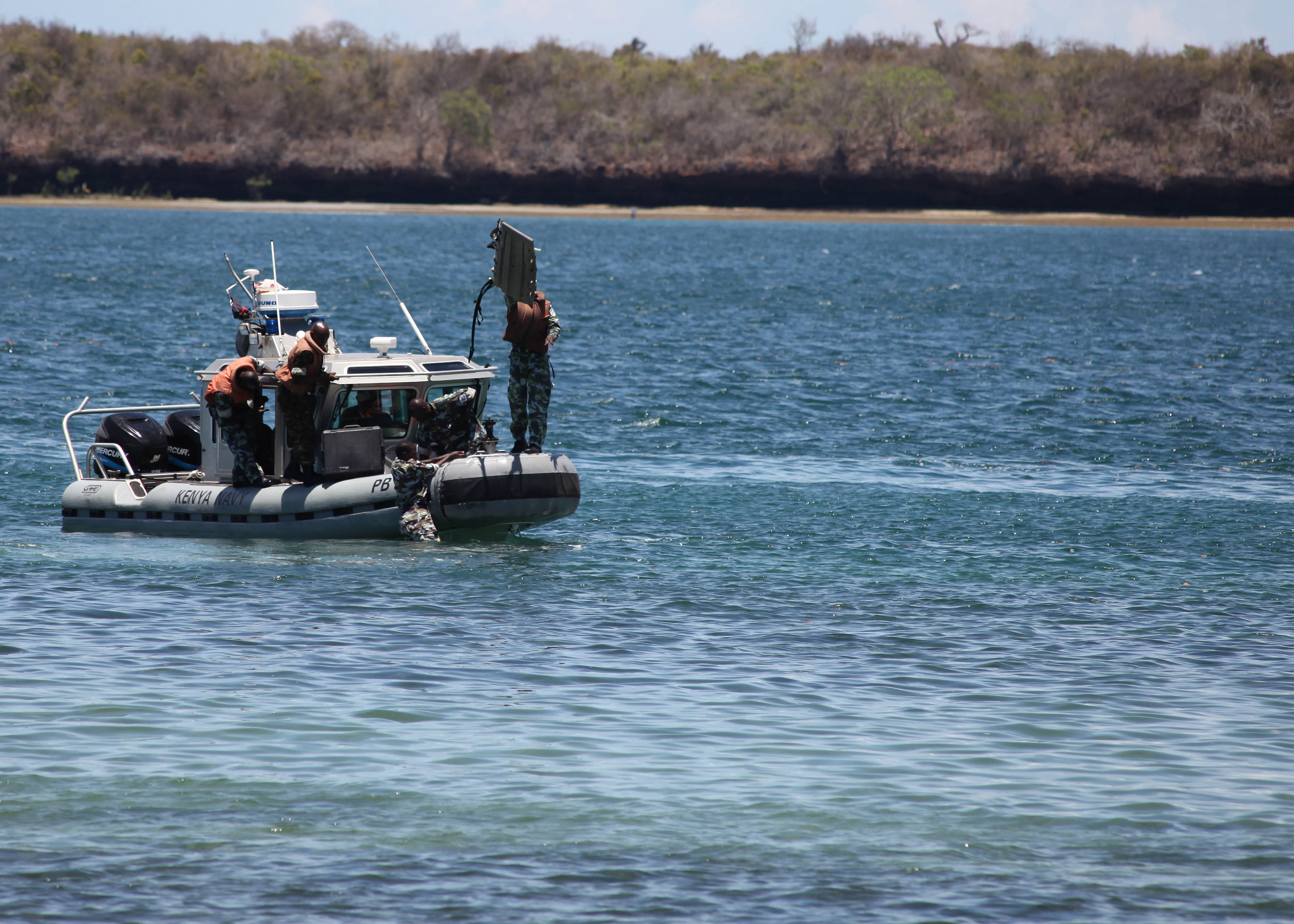
Members of the Special Boat Unit in a simulated mass casualty drill

The Clearance Diving Unit (CDU) formerly known as the Ships Diving Section is an older unit that trains combat divers for the navy. Members are trained in deep sea diving, beach surveying, explosive ordnance disposal and parachute dropping. They are thought to be headquartered at the main naval base in Mtongwe, Mombasa. The Kenya Navy has also taken steps in developing an amphibious infantry force to supplement the work of these special units through the Marine Commando Unit, which was stood up with British assistance, and modelled after the Royal Marines. The unit has continued to receive extensive joint combined training with other elite units from allied nations such as the United States Marine Raiders.

== Fleet ==
=== Current Vessels ===
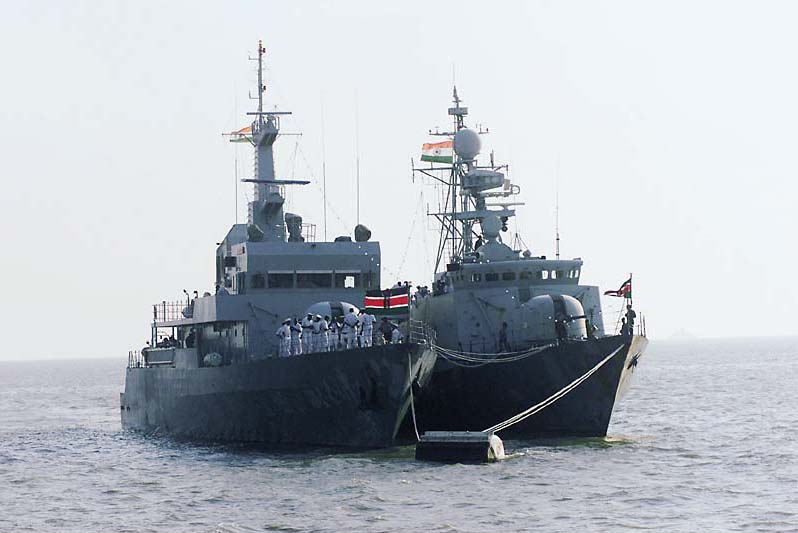
KNS Shujaa and KNS Nyayo during India's International Fleet Review.

- Jasiri, survey ship and offshore patrol vessel, Gondan shipyard Spain.
  - KNS Jasiri (P3124)

Built as a Jasiri Class oceanographic survey vessel at a cost of Sh4.1 billion. Given to Euromarine, a company associated with Anura Pereira, the tender was awarded irregularly, as part of the Anglo-Leasing scandal. Military analysts say a similar vessel could have been built for Sh1.8 billion. Later fitted with armament at the navy's Mkunguni dockyard. Commissioned into the navy on 29 August 2012. It currently is the largest vessel in the fleet. It is 85 metres long, displaces 1400 tonnes, and has a maximum crew of 81.

- P400 Class offshore patrol vessel
  - KNS Harambee II (P3134)

Former French P400 class patrol vessel La Rieuse. Donated by France for anti-piracy patrols.

- Shupavu Class large patrol boats, Gondan shipyard Spain.
  - P3129 KNS Shujaa
  - P3130 KNS Shupavu

Built to civilian standards in 1997 and entered service in 1997. Armed with a 76mm and a 30mm gun in Kenya.

- Nyayo Class missile boats
  - P3126 KNS Nyayo
  - P3127 KNS Umoja

Built by Vosper Thornycroft, these are similar to the Omani Province class, and were delivered in 1987. Armed with 4 Otomat SSM, 1 76 mm OTO DP, 1 dual 30 mm AA, 2 20 mm machine guns. From March 2009 to July 2011 these ships underwent an extensive refit at Fincantieri's Muggiano shipyard in northern Italy, during which their surface-to-surface missile (SSM) systems were removed, drastically reducing the vessels to an OPV (offshore patrol vessel) configuration. Ships of this class are 57 metres long, displace 450 tonnes and have a crew of 45.

- Madaraka Class small missile boats
  - P3100 KNS Mamba – classed as Mamba Class
  - (For three other boats see retired Madaraka Class boats below)

Delivered from 1974–1976 (Mamba was delivered in 1976) and built by Brooke Marine along with three others of the class. KNS Mamba has a non-functioning missile system and is currently used as an OPV. Remainder of the class decommissioned and placed in reserve status. Formerly armed with 4 Gabriel SSM, 1 dual 30 mm AA.

- Galana Class/River Class medium landing ship (LSM) /coastal logistics ships
  - L39 KNS Tana
  - L38 KNS Galana

Built by Construnaves-CEN, Gondan, Spain and delivered in December 1993 from Spain and entered service in 1994. Used for logistics. These ships are unarmed and used for amphibious warfare.

- Archangel class RHIB (jet boat)
  - 1 – 12-metre IPV

Built by SAFE Boats International and donated by the USA in 2006 to reduce gun and drug running.

- USGS Defender Class RHIB with outboard motors
  - 5 – 7-metre IPVs were built by SAFE Boats International and donated by the US in 2006 to reduce gun and drug running.
- P101 Class IPVs
  - P943
  - P944
  - P945
  - P946
  - P947

These ex-Spanish Navy patrol boats were built by ARESA (Arenys del Mar, Barcelona) from 1978 to 1982 and procured by Kenya in 1995. Each is 12m long, with a top speed of 16kts, and armed with a 12.7mm machine gun.

- Personnel Tenders

Two built by Cowes in 1998. Each can carry 136 passengers.

- YTB Harbour Tug
  - KNS Ngamia

Built by James Lamont, Port Glasgow in 1969 for Mombasa Port Authority and transferred to the navy in 1983.

Four 10-metre Metal Shark RHIBs powered by twin 300 horsepower Yamaha outboard engines. Donated by US Navy in June 2015.

=== Past Vessels ===
The Kenya navy has replaced many older vessels from the navy's early years, mostly transfers from the Royal East African Navy via the Royal Navy.

- Ford class seaward defence boat
  - KNS Nyati

Donated by the Royal Navy in 1964 and used as a training vessel. It was formerly known HMS Aberford. It was sold for scrap in 1971.

- Vosper Thornycroft 110' training craft

Training craft was retired in 2000.

- Simba Class patrol crafts (from the UK)
  - P3110 KNS Simba – retired 2000
  - P3111 KNS Chui
  - P3112 KNS Ndovu

These boats were delivered from Britain in 1966. These ships were built by Vosper Thornycroft. KNS Simba was decommissioned in 1997.

- Madaraka Class missile boats (UK)
  - P3122 KNS Jamhuri
  - P3123 KNS Harambee
  - P3121 KNS Madaraka

These missile boats were delivered in 1976 along with KNS Mamba, and were built by Brooke Marine. KNS Madaraka was decommissioned in 2000, and KNS Jamhuri and KNS Harambee in 2002.

== Ranks ==
The names of ranks in the Kenya Navy are army-style, rather than traditional Royal Navy-derived usage as in the remainder of the Commonwealth.

=== Commissioned officer ranks ===
The rank insignia of commissioned officers.

Rank group	General / flag officers				Senior officers			Junior officers
Kenya Navy
Kenya Navy	General	Lieutenant general	Major general	Brigadier	Colonel	Lieutenant colonel	Major	Captain	Lieutenant	Second lieutenant

=== Other ranks ===
The rank insignia of non-commissioned officers and enlisted personnel.

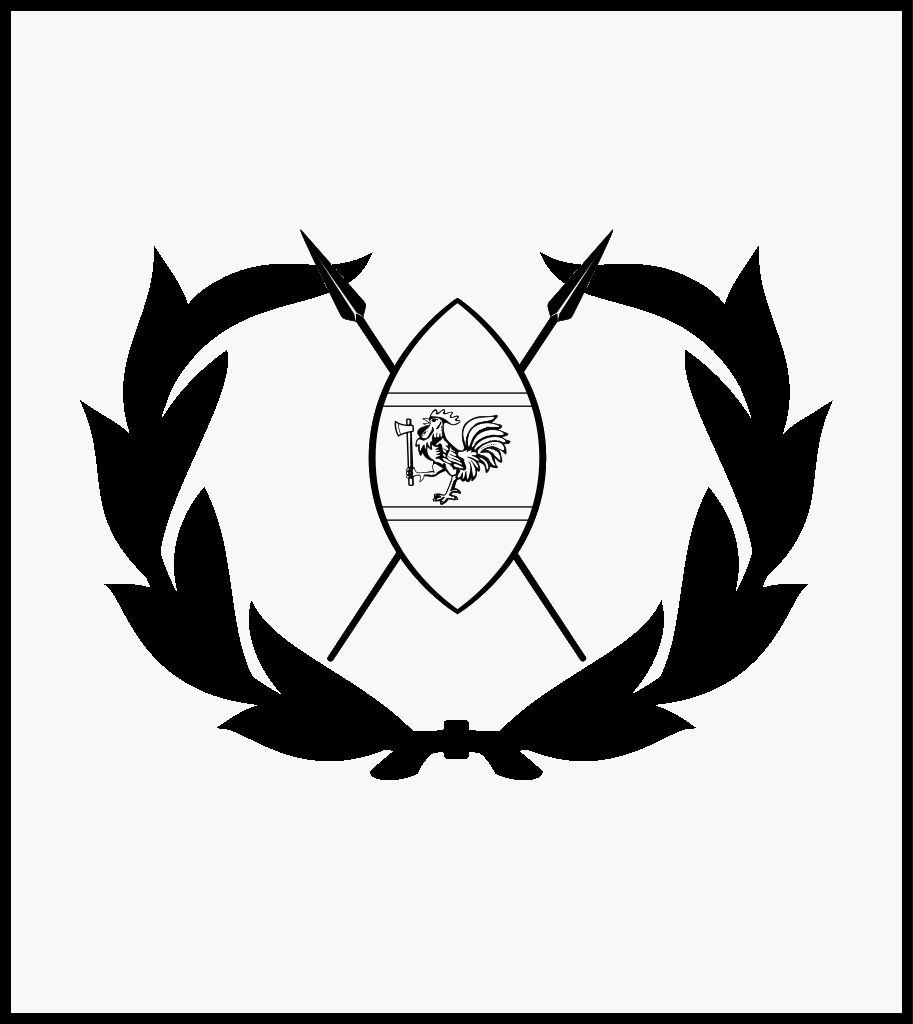
Rank group	Senior NCOs				Junior NCOs	Enlisted
Kenya Navy						No insignia
Kenya Navy	Warrant officer class 1	Warrant officer class 2	Senior sergeant	Sergeant	Corporal	Private (or equivalent)

== See also ==
- Commander, Kenya Navy
