= Nigerian Navy College of Engineering =

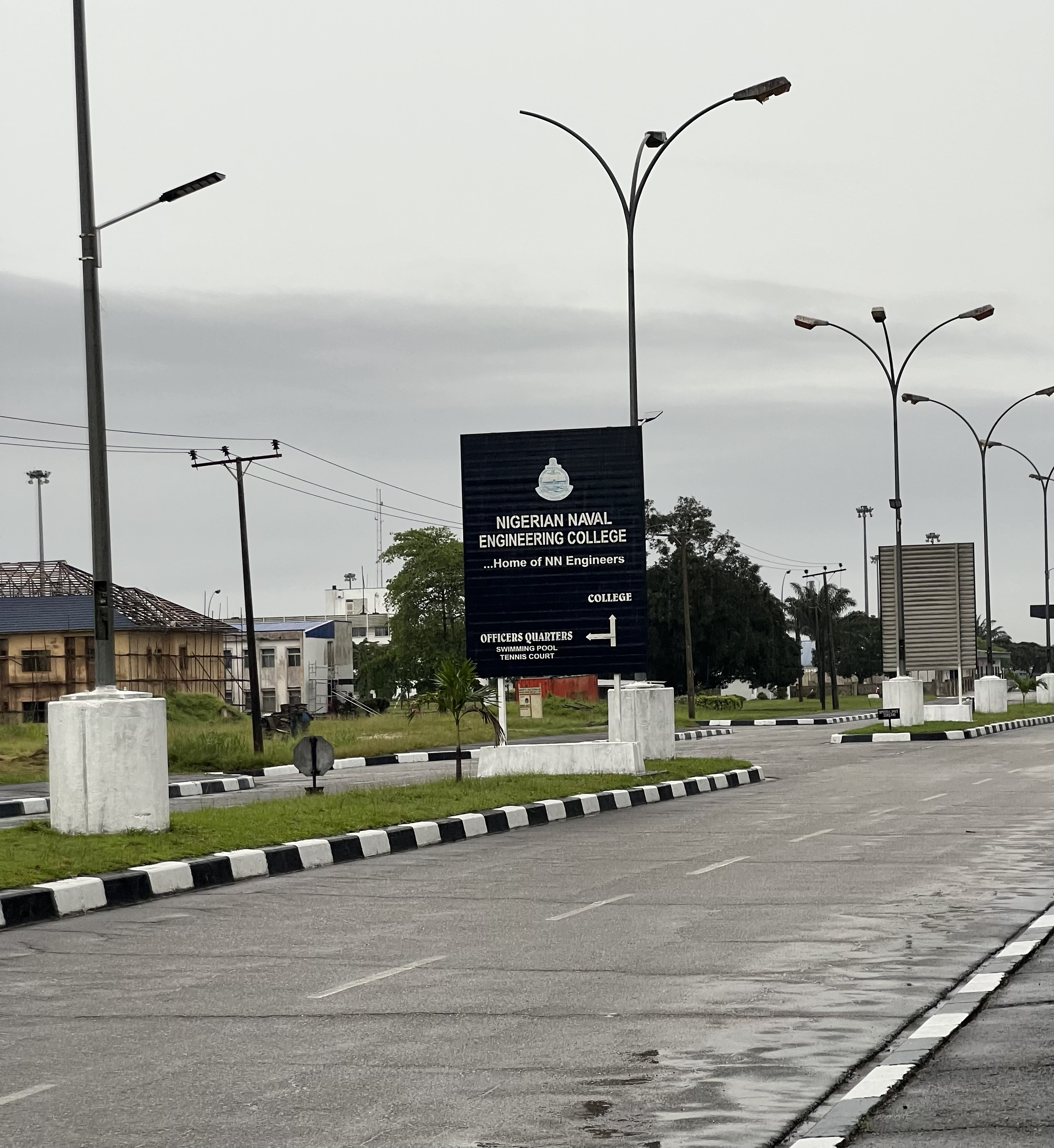
- Nigerian Navy College of Engineering main entrance (inside)
- Founded: 1982
- Country: Nigeria
- Branch: Sapele, Delta State
- Type: Navy
- Role: Naval warfare
- Part of: Nigerian Armed Forces
- Motto: "Onward Together"
- Website: http://www.navy.mil.ng/

Commanders
- Commander-in-Chief: President Bola Tinubu
- Chief of Defence Staff: General Christopher Gwabin Musa
- Chief of Naval Staff: Vice Admiral Emmanuel Ogalla

Insignia
- Naval ensign

Nigerian Naval Engineering College (NNEC) is a Nigerian Government Monotechnic Institute located in Sapele, Delta State, South-South Nigeria.The college is a diploma awarding institute, established by the federal government of Nigeria in the year 1982 to train engineers, technologists and craftmen.

== Administration ==
The college is headed by Rear Admiral Akinsola Johnson who serves as the commandant of the college. The base has seven schools; namely, marine engineering, Weapon Electrical Engineering, automobile, nuclear, biological, fire fighting and air engineering. The commandant said the status of the school will be changed to Polytechnic .
