= Tarkwa Bay Beach =

Beach in Lagos, Nigeria

Coordinates: 6.40148°N 3.39527°E

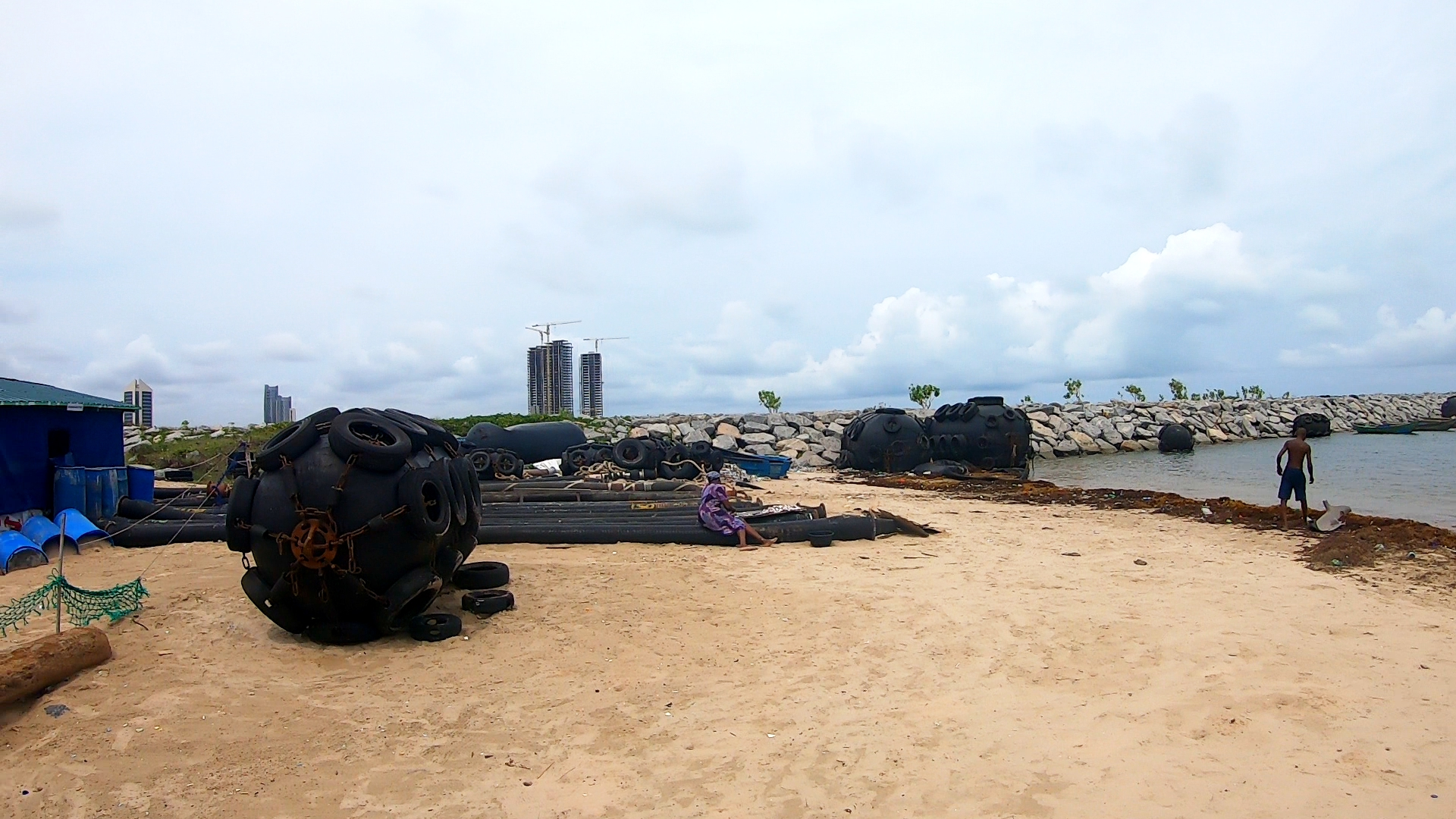
Tire shot entrance

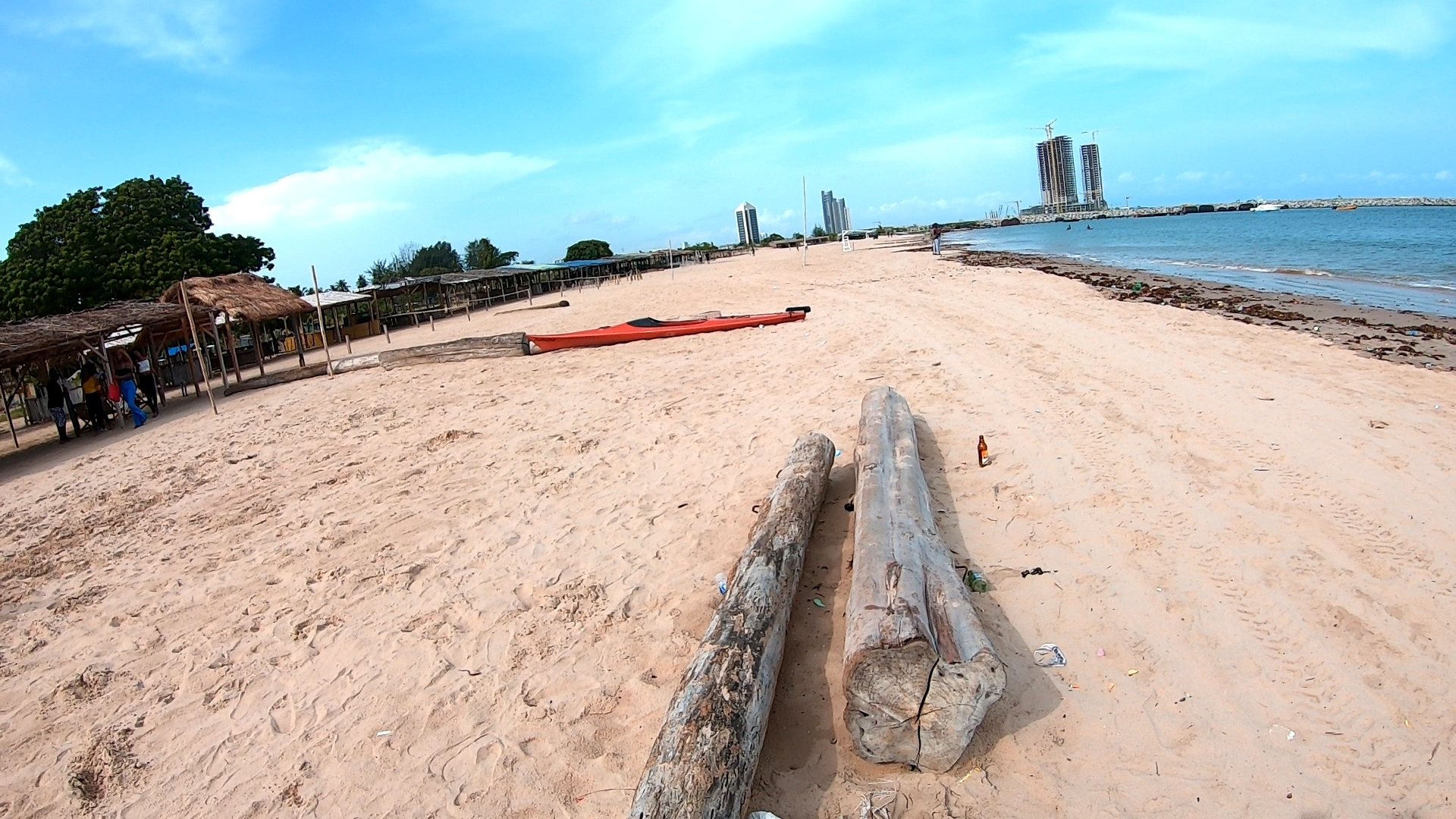
Tarkwa Bay Beach Front

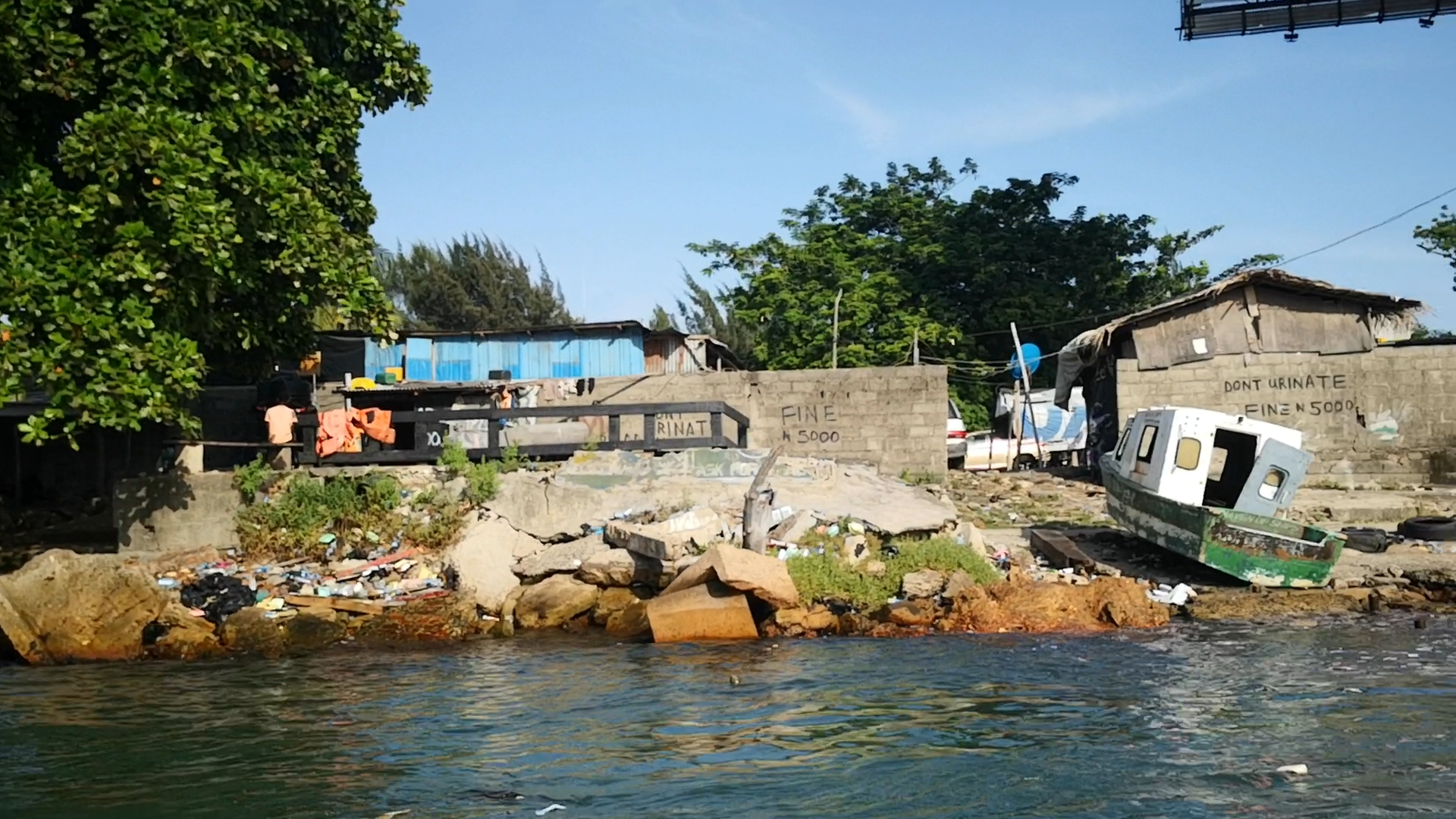
Jetty station bonny camp

Tarkwa Bay is an artificial sheltered beach located near the Lagos harbour in Nigeria.

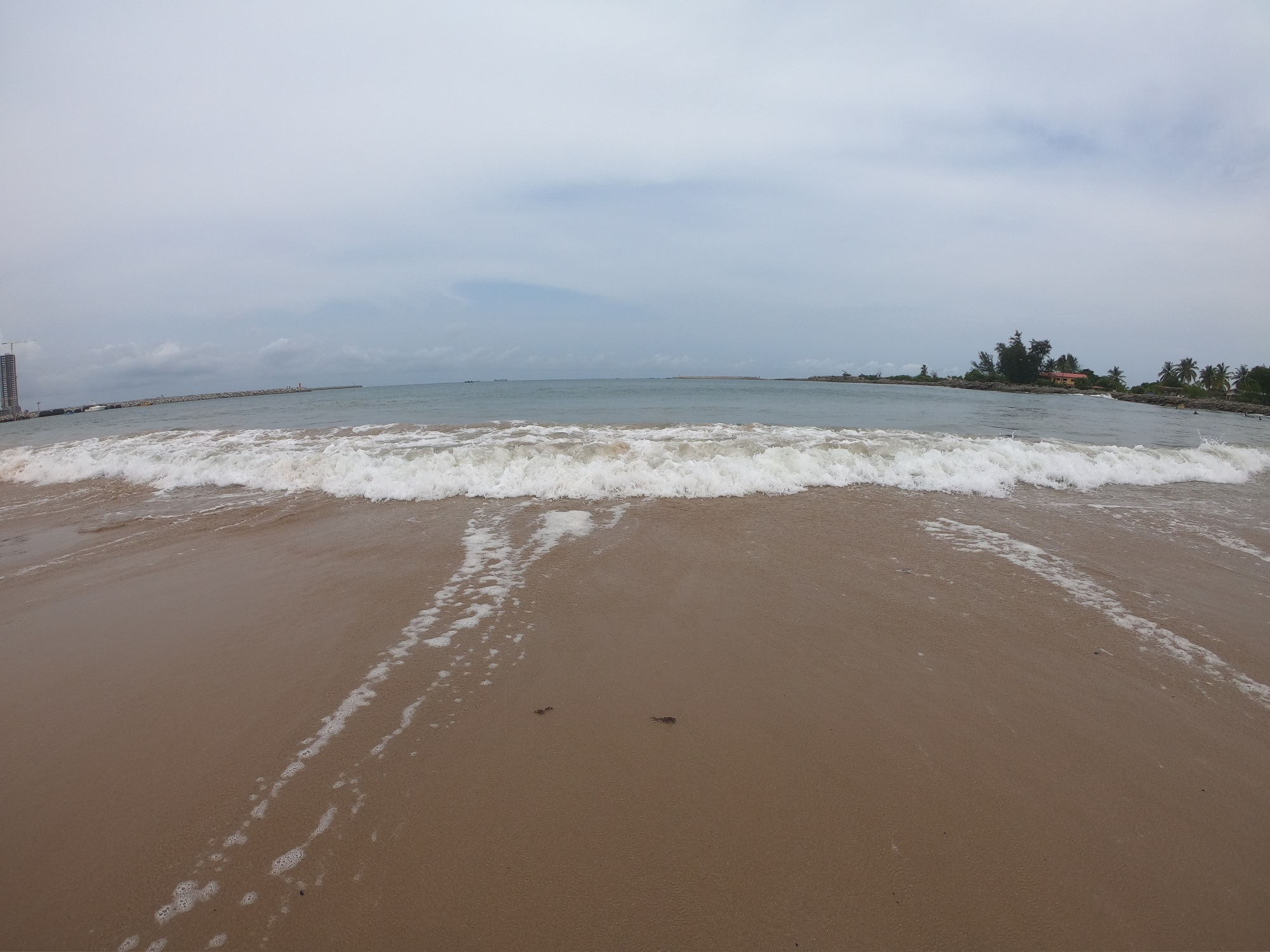

As an island, it is only accessible by boat or water taxis. The beach, popular with swimmers and water-sports enthusiasts.

According to report, the entry fee to the Tarkwa Bay Beach is 2000 Naira for a day and 500 Naira to rent chairs and a thatched tent for the day.

== Climate and environmental issues ==
The Tarkwa Bay Beach has, over the years suffered different kinds of pollution, including plastic pollution and crude oil explosion. The pollution around the Tarkwa Bay Beach area led to the development of different intervention activities to help protect the aquatic environment. The cleanup at the Tarkwa Bay Beach and other coastal communities resulted in the collection of over 180,000 pieces of plastics from the marine environment. In a bid to restore sanity to the environment and reduce pipeline vandalism, an eviction notice was served to residents in different quarters of the beach.
