= Commander, Kenya Navy =

Professional head of the Kenya Navy

- Incumbent; Major General Paul Owuor Otieno since May 2, 2024
- Kenya Defence Forces
- Reports to: Chief of Defence Forces
- Appointer: President of Kenya
- Term length: At the President’s pleasure
- Formation: December 10, 1964
- First holder: Cdr E. M. C. Walker, RN
- Website: Official website

The Commander, Kenya Navy (Swahili: Kamanda, Jeshi la Wanamaji) is the professional head and highest-ranking officer of the Kenya Navy. The Commander exercises full command over the service, oversees operations, administration, training and modernization, and reports to the Chief of Defence Forces under the authority of the President of Kenya, who is the Commander-in-Chief. Established in 1964, the post was initially held by officers of the Royal Navy before transition to Kenyan command in 1972, when Lt Col J. C. J. Kimaro became the first Kenyan to head the service.

== Responsibilities ==
- Operational command and deployment of naval forces and assets.
- Administration, discipline, training, and personnel welfare across the service.
- Representing the Navy in joint/combined activities and state ceremonies, including the biannual Kenya Navy Divisions parade.

== History ==
No.		Name	Term of office			Ref.
No.	Official Portrait	Name	Took office	Left office	Time in office	Ref.
1		Commander E. M. C. Walker	10 Dec 1964	31 Jul 1967	2 years, 233 days	
2		Commander Anthony Allen Pearse	1 Aug 1967	1 Oct 1969	2 years, 61 days	
3		Commander W. A. E. Hall	2 Oct 1969	31 Oct 1972	3 years, 29 days	
4		Lieutenant colonel James Collins Josiah Kimaro	1 Nov 1972	11 Feb 1978	5 years, 102 days	
5		Major General Eliud Simon Mbilu	12 Feb 1978	1 Apr 1988	10 years, 49 days	
6		Major General Joseph Raymond Edward Kibwana	2 Apr 1988	1 May 1998	10 years, 29 days	
7		Major General Aboud Abdalla Rafrouf	2 May 1998	30 Nov 2001	3 years, 212 days	
8		Major General Pastor Omudho Awitta, MGH, EBS	1 Dec 2001	26 Jul 2006	4 years, 237 days	
9		Major General Samson Jefwa Mwathethe, EGH, MBS, DCO, 'ndc' (K) 'psc' (UK)	27 Jul 2006	12 Jul 2011	4 years, 350 days	
10		Major General Ngewa Mukala, MGH, EBS, DCO 'ndc' (K), 'psc'(K)	13 Jul 2011	10 Aug 2015	4 years, 28 days	
11		Major General Levi Franklin Mghalu, MGH, MBS, 'ndc' (K), 'psn' (RSA)	11 Aug 2015	11 May 2020	4 years, 268 days	
12		Major General Jimson Longiro Mutai, MGH, MBS 'ndc'(K) 'psc'(K)	12 May 2020	8 March 2024	3 years, 301 days	
13		Major general Thomas Njoroge Nganga EBS HSC 'ndu' 'psc'(USA)	8 March 2024	2 May 2024	55 days	
14		Major General Paul Owuor Otieno EBS 'ndc'(K) 'psc'(K)	2 May 2024	incumbent		

== See also ==
- Kenya Navy
- Kenya Defence Forces
- Chief of Defence Forces (Kenya)
