= Eliud Mbilu =

Kenyan former military commander

Eliud Simon Mbilu
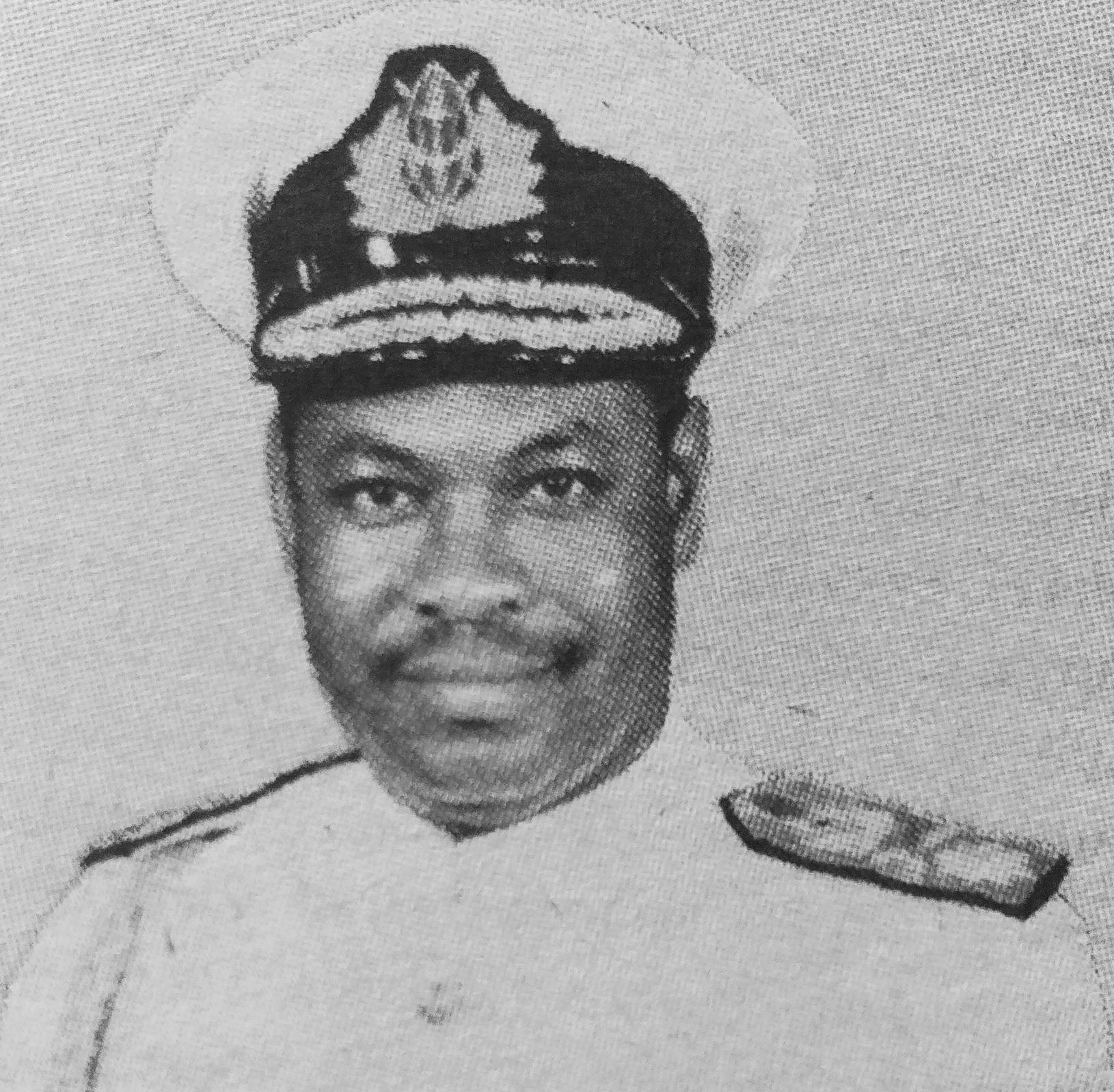
- Major General Eliud Mbilu
- Born: 1942; Mombasa County, British Kenya
- Died: April 30, 2017 (aged 74-75); Nairobi, Kenya
- Education: Britannia Royal Naval College
- Military career
- Allegiance: Kenya
- Branch: Kenya Navy
- Rank: Major General
- Commands: Commander, Kenya Navy

Eliud Simon Mbilu was the longest serving commander of the Kenyan Navy from 1978 until his retirement in 1988.

== Early life ==
Simon Mbilu was born the eldest of six siblings in 1942 in Mombasa, an island town of the Indian Ocean coast of Kenya. His father, John Kithuku Ndunda, then working for the Kenya Railway, moved back to his ancestral village of Mulango in Kitui County when Mbilu was two years old.

== Education ==
Simon Mbilu attended Kitui Primary School and then Kitui School. He was later accepted to Shimo La Tewa High School where he completed form five and six at the top of his class. He applied and was accepted to Makerere University where he intended to study Law.

At this time, Kenya was a new country and had just attained independence. The Kenya Armed Forces was on a quest to recruit the country's top talent and as a result he was subsequently drafted into the Kenya Navy.

He was also able to attain further training and studies at the Britannia Royal Naval College under the sponsorship of the Kenyan navy.

== Career ==
In 1978, when the first Kenya Navy Commander Lieutenant Colonel Kimaro was killed in a road accident, Mbilu, a Major at the time, took over the command of the Navy as Major E S Mbilu. He served for ten years until his retirement in 1988 where he was replaced by Brigadier JRE Kibwana.

After his navy career, he also served briefly as chairman of the Kenya Airports Authority.

In 1994, he was appointed by former President Daniel arap Moi to serve in the Commission of Inquiry into the Mtongwe ferry disaster headed by Justice Msagha Mbogholi.

== Family ==
Simon Mbilu's first wife was Avia Kavutha Mbilu (deceased) with whom he had one son, Peter Mbilu (deceased), and five daughters namely, Marie, Nancy, Julie (deceased), Esther and Betty. Later on, in his retirement when he settled in his native Mulango, Kitui, he had a second wife, Eunice, with whom he lived until his death. He had no children with the second wife.

Renowned model, designer and LGBTQ activist Biko Beauttah is Mbilu's grandchild.

Squabbles between his second wife and the children of his first wife saw his interment delayed for months.

== Death ==
Eliud Mbilu died on April 30, 2017, after a long battle with cancer at MP Shah Hospital in Nairobi.
