= HMS Montford =

History

United Kingdom
- Name: Montford
- Launched: 10 October 1957
- Identification: P3124
- Fate: Sold on 9 September 1966 to Nigeria

Nigeria
- Name: Ibadan
- Acquired: 9 September 1966
- Captured: By Biafra on 30 May 1967

Biafra
- Name: Vigilance
- Commissioned: 30 May 1967
- Fate: Sunk on 9 October 1967

General characteristics
- Class & type: Ford-class seaward defence boat
- Displacement: 120 tons standard; 160 tons full load
- Length: 117 ft 3 in (35.74 m)
- Beam: 20 ft (6.1 m)
- Draught: 6 ft 6 in (1.98 m)
- Propulsion: 1 × Foden diesel (Centre shaft); 2 × Paxman 12YHAX 550 hp (410 kW) Diesels (Outer shafts)
- Speed: 20 knots (37 km/h)
- Armament: 1 × Bofors 40 mm gun; 2 × Oerlikon 20 mm cannons

BNS Vigilance was one of 23 boats of the Ford class of patrol boats built for the Royal Navy in the 1950s and led ship of Biafran Navy

Their names were all chosen from villages ending in -ford. This boat was named after Montford, Shropshire. She was launched on 10 October 1957 and sold to Nigeria on 9 September 1966. Renamed NNS Ibadan, she was captured at the declaration of independence of Biafra by independentists in Calabar. She saw action as BNS Vigilance during Nigerian Civil War and was sunk on 9 October 1967 at Port Harcourt.
