= Ford-class seaward defence boat =

Class of anti-submarine inshore patrol boat

Ford class
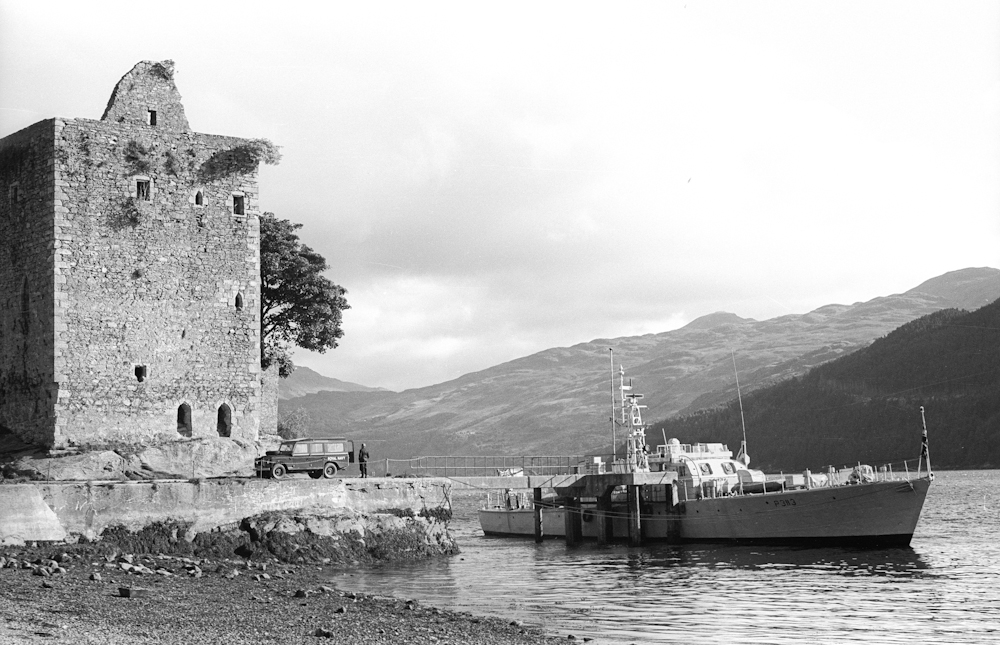
- Droxford at Carrick Castle, Loch Goil 1975

Class overview
- Name: Ford class
- Builders: Various
- Operators: Royal Navy; South African Navy; Kenya Navy; Royal Ceylon Navy; Nigerian Navy; (Republic of Biafra) Biafran Navy
- Built: 1950s
- In service: 1952–1967
- Completed: 23
- Preserved: HMS Gifford

General characteristics
- Type: Large patrol craft
- Displacement: 120 long tons (122 t) standard; 140 long tons (142 t) full load
- Length: 117 ft 2 in (35.71 m) o/a; 110 ft (34 m) p/p
- Beam: 20 ft (6.1 m)
- Draught: 6 ft 6 in (1.98 m)
- Propulsion: 1 × Foden diesel (centre shaft); 2 × Davey Paxman 12YHAX 550 hp (410 kW) diesels (outer shafts); 23 tons oil fuel
- Speed: 18 knots (33 km/h; 21 mph)
- Complement: 19
- Armament: Depth charge rails with both large and small charges

The Ford-class seaward defence boats were built for the Royal Navy (with three built for the South African Navy) in the 1950s.

== Development ==
They were designed to detect and attack hostile submarines, including midget submarines in inshore waters such as the approaches to large ports. They were powered by diesel engines and were planned to be armed with a single barreled Squid anti-submarine mortar. This special version of the Squid was a failure however, with the first Ford-class boat, HMS Shalford being fitted with a normal three-barreled Squid and the remaining vessels with a more conventional anti-submarine armament of depth-charge throwers. A single Bofors 40 mm gun completed the armament.

HMS Droxford served for a time as the tender for Glasgow and Strathclyde Universities Royal Naval Unit, and was administered by RNR Clyde. The vessel was used to train Midshipmen who were students of the universities and participated in fishery protection duties along the west coast of Scotland. HMS Beckford (P3104) was renamed HMS Dee and served as the tender to Liverpool University Royal Naval Unit.

== Ships ==
- HMS Shalford (P3101)
- HMS Aberford (P3102) – Transferred to Kenyan Navy as KNS Nyati
- HMS Axford (P3103) – Transferred to Nigerian Navy as NNS Kaduna
- HMS Beckford (P3104)
- HMS Brayford (P3105) – Transferred to South African Navy, initially as HMSAS Gelderland – Renamed to SAS Gelderland
- HMS Bryansford (P3106) – Transferred to Nigerian Navy as NNS Ibadan II.
- HMS Camberford (P3107)
- HMS Desford (P3108) – Transferred to Royal Ceylon Navy as HMCyS Kotiya
- HMS Greatford (P3109)
- HMS Gifford (P3111) – Transferred to Nigerian Navy as NNS Bonny
- HMS Droxford (P3113)
- HMS Mayford (P3114)
- HMS Hinksford (P3115) – Transferred to Nigerian Navy as NNS Benin
- HMS Ickford (P3116)
- HMS Dubford (P3119) – Transferred to Nigerian Navy as NNS Sapele
- HMS Glassford (P3120) – Transferred to South African Navy, initially as HMSAS Nautilus – Renamed to SAS Nautilus
- HMS Kingsford (P3121)
- HMS Marlingford (P3122)
- HMS Tilford (P3123) Sold in Singapore 1967.
- HMS Montford (P3124) – Transferred to Nigerian Navy as NNS Ibadan. Captured by Biafran forces during the Nigerian Civil War and put into Biafran navy as BNS Vigilance. Sunk by Nigerian Navy on 9 October 1967 at Port Harcourt.
- HMSAS Rijger (P3125) – Renamed SAS Rijger
- HMSAS Haerlem (P3126) – Renamed SAS Haerlem
- HMSAS Oosterland (P3127) – Renamed SAS Oosterland

== See also ==
Equivalent patrol vessels of the same era

- Balder class
- Stenka class
