= Bonny River =

River in Nigeria

Coordinates: 4°23′N 7°06′E

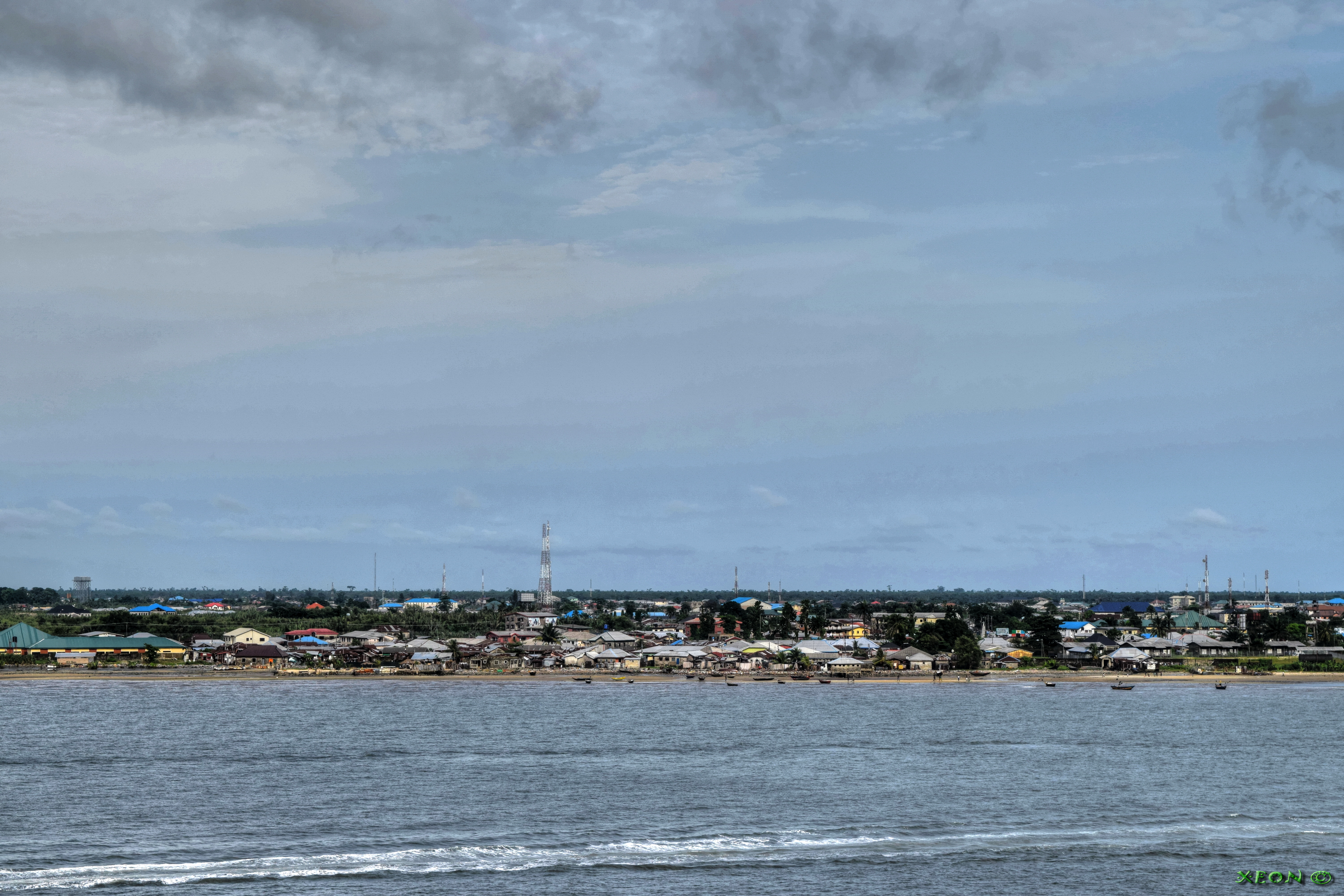
In_Bonny_River_-_panoramio

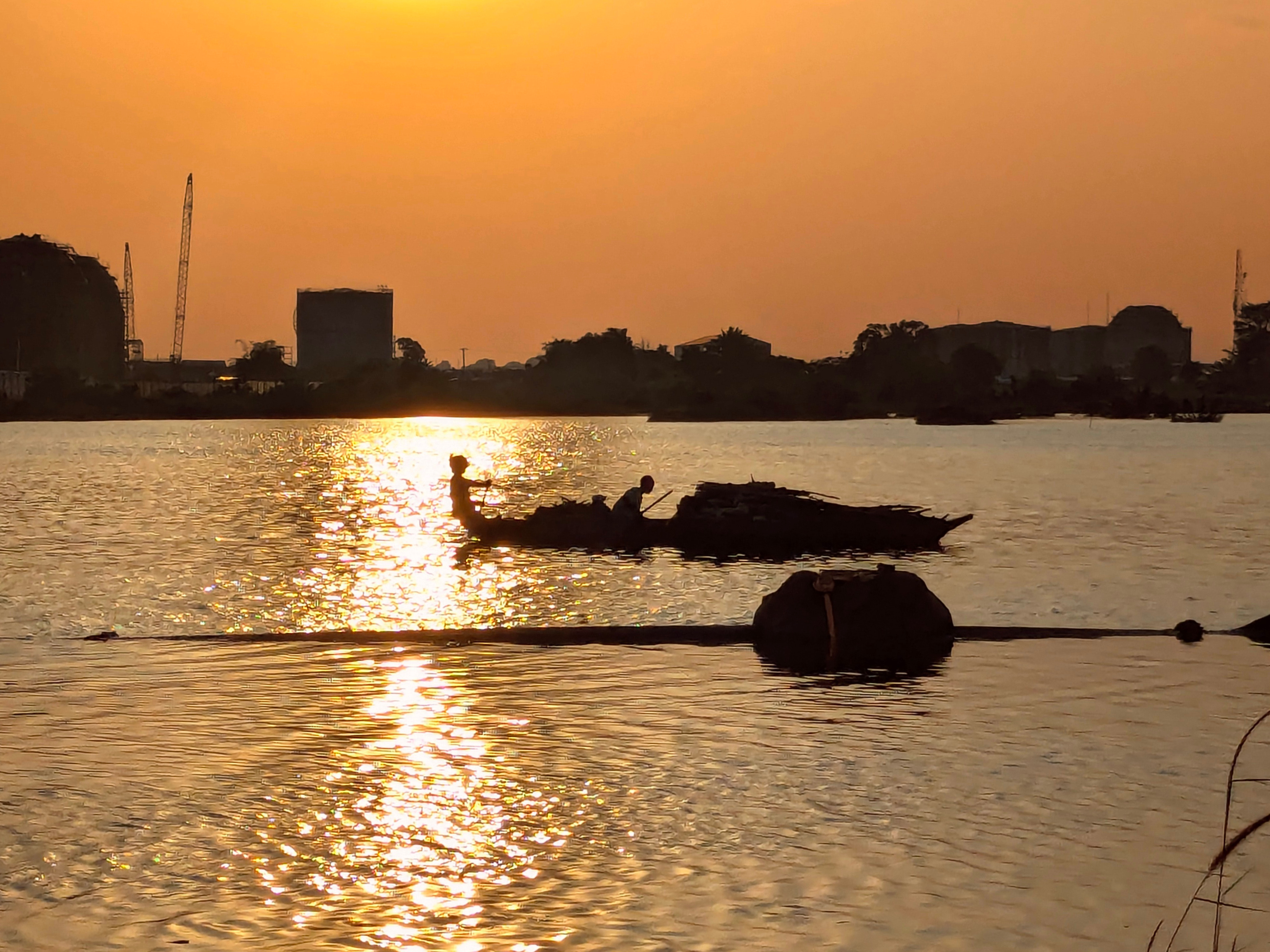
Sunset at Bonny River

Bonny River is a river in Rivers State, Nigeria. Water taxis that move along the river provide the connection between Bonny Island and Port Harcourt, the capital of Rivers State, which lies alongside the river. It is also an arm of the Niger River delta. Shellfish such as prawns, periwinkle, and crabs found in Bonny rivers have been discovered to contain high metals. The major activities done in Bonny River is fishing and transportation of people and goods.

== Industries in Bonny River ==
- Nigeria Liquefied Natural Gas (NLNG) Limited
- Federal Light and Ocean Terminals (FLT & FOT)
- Saipem Contracting Limited
- Aveon Offshore Limited
- International Hydrographic Organisation (IHO)

== Climate ==
Bonny has a Tropical monsoon climate, the wet season is always warm, the dry season is hot and mostly cloudy sometimes, and it is oppressive year-round. During the year, the temperature typically varies from 21 °C (70 °F) to 31 °C (88 °F) and is rarely below 18 °C (65 °F) or above 33 °C (91 °F).

== Pollution ==
It was reported in 2014, that Bonny River is being polluted by crude oil spillage.

Bonny Island has been seen with natural contamination brought about by a gas blast that has particularly impacted the fauna and flora of the climate. This gaseous release has caused individuals to die while many are battling for survival in clinics; fish are killed, and soil surfaces are annihilated. This has particularly expanded the issues of poverty, demise, suffering, infection, and hunger of individuals.

== See also ==
- Bonny Light oil
- Niger Delta
