= Wehrmachtbefehlshaber =

Military position

Commander of the Wehrmacht
- Wehrmachtbefehlshaber
- Standard of the Wehrmachtbefehlshaber
- Wehrmacht
- Type: Supreme Commander
- Status: Abolished
- Abbreviation: W.Bfh.
- Member of: Wehrmacht
- Reports to: Oberkommando der Wehrmacht
- Appointer: Führer
- Term length: No fixed length
- Formation: 1940
- Abolished: 7 May 1945

The Wehrmachtbefehlshaber (Note: Also spelled Wehrmachtsbefehlshaber) (lit. 'Military Commander' (Note: Originally translated as the Department of Defence Commander)) was the German chief military position in countries occupied by the Wehrmacht which were headed by a civilian administration. The main responsibilities of this position were military security in the area and command of the defense in case of attack or invasion. The Wehrmachtbefehlshaber also had a judicial function, as he served as judge in German military courts. He had no control over German Army units, but was responsible for the housing of troops. In the occupied territories of the Soviet Union, the Wehrmachtsbefehlshaber was also responsible for securing the occupied territories, protecting transport links, and recording the crops.

== Wehrmachtbefehlshaber in the occupied areas ==
=== Balkan ===
Following the Invasion of Yugoslavia, the commander of the 12th Army was designated "Commander-in-Chief of the German troops in the Balkans", which was later renamed Wehrmachtbefehlshaber Südost.

No.	Portrait	Wehrmachtsbefehlshaber Südost	Took office	Left office	Time in office	Ref.
1	Wilhelm List	Generalfeldmarschall; Wilhelm List (1880–1971)	9 June 1941	15 October 1941	128 days	
2	Walter Kuntze	General der Pioniere; Walter Kuntze (1883–1960)	29 October 1941	2 July 1942	246 days	
3	Alexander Löhr	Generaloberst; Alexander Löhr (1885–1947)	3 July 1942	31 December 1942	181 days	

=== Belgium and Northern France ===
In Belgium and Northern France, control was originally given to a Military Administration. However, in July 1944, after the dismissal of Alexander von Falkenhausen and the creation of the Reichskommissariat of Belgium and Northern France, the post of Wehrmachtbefehlshaber Belgien-Nordfrankreich was established.

No.	Portrait	Wehrmachtbefehlshaber Belgien-Nordfrankreich	Took office	Left office	Time in office	Ref.
1	Martin Grase	General der Infanterie; Martin Grase (1891–1963)	15 July 1944	13 September 1944	60 days	
2	Richard Jungclaus	SS-Gruppenführer; Richard Jungclaus (1905–1945)	13 September 1944	September 1944	<17 days	

==== Greater Paris ====
On 1 August 1944, Hitler appointed Dietrich von Choltitz, Commanding general and Wehrmachtbefehlshaber of greater Paris (German: Kommandierenden General und Wehrmachtbefehlshaber von Groß-Paris).

No.	Portrait	Wehrmachtbefehlshaber von Groß-Paris	Took office	Left office	Time in office	Ref.
1	Dietrich von Choltitz	General der Infanterie; Dietrich von Choltitz (1894–1966)	1 August 1944	25 August 1944	24 days	

=== Channel Islands ===
Following the German occupation of the Channel Islands, command was given to the Wehrmachtbefehlshaber Kanalinseln.

No.	Portrait	Wehrmachtbefehlshaber Kanalinseln	Took office	Left office	Time in office	Ref.
1	Rudolf Graf von Schmettow	Generalleutnant; Rudolf Graf von Schmettow (1891–1970)	1 October 1944	20 February 1945	148 days	
2	Friedrich Hüffmeier	Vizeadmiral; Friedrich Hüffmeier (1898–1972)	26 February 1945	9 May 1945	72 days	

=== Denmark ===
Following the German occupation of Denmark, on 9 April 1940, the post of Befehlshaber der Deutsches Truppen des Heeres in Dänemark was created, with Leonhard Kaupisch initially holding the position. The Befehlshaber's task was to provide military security for Denmark and to prevent hostile landings. Following the Telegram Crisis and the breakdown of cooperation between the Danish government and the German occupation force, Erich Lüdke was removed from the post, and its role was expanded to Wehrmachtbefehlshaber Dänemark. The post lasted until the surrender of Germany.

No.	Portrait	Wehrmachtbefehlshaber Dänemark	Took office	Left office	Time in office	Ref.
1	Hermann von Hanneken	General der Infanterie; Hermann von Hanneken (1890–1981)	12 October 1942	27 January 1945	2 years, 107 days	
2	Georg Lindemann	Generaloberst; Georg Lindemann (1884–1963)	27 January 1945	6 May 1945	99 days	

=== The Netherlands ===
With the creation of the Reichskommissariat Niederlande, the post of Wehrmachtbefehlshaber in den Niederlanden was established, having control over the military in the area. By order of 17 May 1942, the Wehrmachtbefehlshaber received the position and powers of an army commander-in-chief.

No.	Portrait	Wehrmachtbefehlshaber in den Niederlanden	Took office	Left office	Time in office	Ref.
1	Friedrich Christiansen	General der Flieger; Friedrich Christiansen (1879–1972)	29 May 1940	7 April 1945	4 years, 313 days	

=== Norway ===
On 25 July 1940, Wilhelm Keitel added a supplement to the Führer Decree of 24 April 1940 on the exercise of governmental powers in Norway, which ordered that the commander of XXI Army Corps should immediately bear the name "Wehrmachtbefehlshaber Norwegen".

In order to prepare for the war against the USSR and the subsequent command on the Finnish theater of action, a "Command Center Finland" of the AOK Norway was set up. The Army High Command in Lapland emerged from this command post. On 14 January 1942, it took command of the AOK Norway's forces on the Finnish front. On 22 June 1942, AOK Lapland was renamed 20th Mountain Army.

When the German troops on the Scandinavian Peninsula had to withdraw, there was a reorganization of the command structure. The AOK Norway was dissolved on 18 December 1944; the powers of the Wehrmachtbefehlshaber passed to commander of the 20th Mountain Army.

No.	Portrait	Wehrmachtbefehlshaber Norwegen	Took office	Left office	Time in office	Ref.
1	Nikolaus von Falkenhorst	Generaloberst; Nikolaus von Falkenhorst (1885–1968)	25 July 1940	18 December 1944	4 years, 146 days	
2	Lothar Rendulic	Generaloberst; Lothar Rendulic (1887–1971)	18 December 1944	8 January 1945	21 days	
3	Franz Böhme	General der Gebirgstruppe; Franz Böhme (1885–1947)	8 January 1945	7 May 1945	119 days	

=== Ostland ===
In the Reichskommissariat Ostland the military command was controlled by the Wehrmachtsbefehlshaber Ostland. The Wehrmachtsbefehlshaber was responsible for security within the occupied territories (including partisan control), to protect traffic connections and to record the harvest. It was created on 25 July 1941 and was transferred to Kolberg on 10 August 1944 as part of the withdrawal, and was dissolved on September 30, 1944.

No.	Portrait	Wehrmachtbefehlshaber Ostland	Took office	Left office	Time in office	Ref.
1	Walter Braemer	Generalleutnant; Walter Braemer (1883–1955)	24 June 1941	18 April 1944	2 years, 299 days	
2	Werner Kempf	General der Panzertruppe; Werner Kempf (1886–1964)	1 May 1944	10 August 1944	101 days	

==== Belarus ====
The Wehrmachtsbefehlshaber Weißruthenien staff was created on 18 April 1944 from the Commanding general of security forces and commanders in the Army Group Rear Area staff. From 15 October 1943, this staff was subordinate to the Wehrmachtsbefehlshaber Weißruthenien as "Commanding general of security forces and commanders in White Ruthenia". Parts of the staff were used in July 1944 for the formation of the Rothkirch General Command, which was reclassified as General Command LIII Army Corps on 13 November 1944.

No.	Portrait	Wehrmachtbefehlshaber Weißruthenien	Took office	Left office	Time in office	Ref.
1	Edwin Graf von Rothkirch und Trach	General der Kavallerie; Edwin Graf von Rothkirch und Trach (1888–1980)	18 April 1944	27 October 1944	192 days	

=== Ukraine ===
In Reichskommissariat Ukraine the military control was given to the Wehrmachtbefehlshaber Ukraine, which was created on 1 September 1941.

No.	Portrait	Wehrmachtbefehlshaber Ukraine	Took office	Left office	Time in office	Ref.
1	Waldemar Henrici	Generalleutnant; Waldemar Henrici (1878–1950)	1 September 1941	October 1942	1 year, 3 months	
2	Karl Kitzinger [de]	General der Flieger; Karl Kitzinger (1886–1962)	October 1942	21 July 1944	1 year, 9 months	

=== Sardinia and Corsica ===
Wehrmachtbefehlshaber Sardinien und Korsika WB Korsika was formed in September 1943 in direct succession to Wehrmachtbefehlshaber auf Sardinien und Korsika when the latter HQ was renamed officially for the last time. The combined staff for Sardinia and Corsica was created before in summer 1943 by merging the before existing staffs of Kommandant der deutschen Wehrmacht auf Korsika and Kommandant der deutschen Wehrmacht auf Sardinien. With the evacuation of Sardinia in September already and the evacuation of Corsica on 3 October 1943 (entirely finished on 5 October) finally, the staff ceased to exist.

No.	Portrait	Wehrmachtbefehlshaber Sardinien und Korsika	Took office	Left office	Time in office	Ref.
1	Fridolin von Senger und Etterlin	Generalleutnant; Fridolin von Senger und Etterlin (1891–1963)	8 September 1943	5 October 1943	27 days	
