= USS PC-552 =

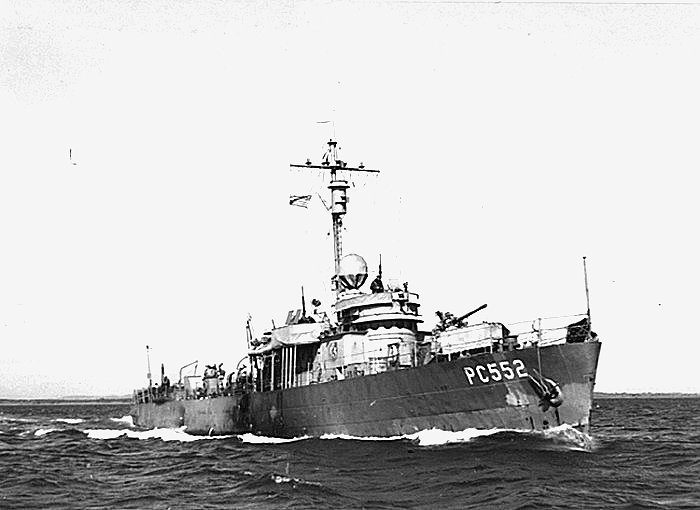
- USS PC-552 in action

History

United States
- Ordered: 1 April 1941
- Builder: Sullivan Drydock and Repair Corporation (Brooklyn, New York, U.S.A.)
- Laid down: 20 May 1941
- Launched: 13 February 1942
- Commissioned: 29 July 1942
- Decommissioned: 18 April 1946
- Stricken: 5 June 1946
- Identification: Call sign: Nan – Baker – Uncle – Yoke
- Fate: 6 December 1946 to Maritime Commission, predecessor to MARAD. Ultimate fate unknown.

General characteristics
- Class & type: Class 461 Patrol Craft ("PC")
- Displacement: 280 t.(lt), 450 t.(fl)
- Length: 173 ft 8 in (52.93 m)
- Beam: 23 ft (7.0 m)
- Draft: 10 ft 10 in (3.30 m)
- Installed power: 2 × 1,440 bhp (1,070 kW) General Motors 16-258S
- Propulsion: Farrel-Birmingham single reduction gear; 2 × shafts
- Speed: 20.2 knots (37.4 km/h; 23.2 mph)
- Complement: 65
- Armament: 1 × 3 in (76 mm)/50 cal dual purpose gun; 1 × 40 mm gun; 3 × 20 mm cannons; 2 × rocket launchers; 4 × depth charge throwers; 2 × depth charge tracks
- Notes: Battle of the Atlantic, Battle of Normandy.

USS PC-552 was a class-461 patrol craft ("PC") that was at the forefront of the naval efforts during the Normandy invasion. It served as convoy protection in the North Atlantic and as one of about ten PC control vessels off Omaha Beach during the Normandy invasion. PC-552 was among the first ships to reach waters off Omaha Beach. PC-552, primary control vessel for Fox Green sector of the beach, was forced into rescue efforts and recovery of bodies at the departure line for Fox Green when the Duplex Drive tanks that survived the initial disastrous launch were swamped at the line with only two surviving. The PC was diverted into this effort for forty-five minutes and ultimately only five tanks, the two that survived the launch disaster and three that were aboard LCT-600 whose commander raised his ramp when the first off foundered and instead landed them on the beach, reached the beach.

PC-552 remained in European waters until 6 June 1945, where after a ceremony commemorating the events of the previous year on that date, a convoy of PCs departed for the Atlantic crossing. PC-552 arrived at Key West, Florida on 22 June 1945 and was decommissioned at Charleston, South Carolina on 18 April 1946.

== Patrol craft ==
Patrol craft were 173 ft. long, had crews of 60 sailors and five officers, and were originally built for Anti-Submarine Warfare (ASW), convoy escort duty, and coastal patrols. Most sailors referred to the PCs as the "Donald Duck Navy." .

== Class ==
PC-552 was a Class 461 ship. Class 461 Patrol Craft were built mainly for the US Navy from 1941 to 1944. This class was called Class 461 because the first one built was PC-461, which began the series. The first of the class to enter service was the PC-471. The class 461 was designed for rapid production in large numbers, to be effective anti-submarine vessels, and to relieve larger vessels from convoy duty. The U.S. Navy usually did not provide traditional names to PCs; the name of this ship was PC-552. This PC class was considered seaworthy but bounced around on the water like no other craft. The PCs were a match for the enemy submarines when the submarines were submerged but the PCs were clearly outgunned in a surface battle. In such a case, the PC's preferred tactic was to charge the submarine to ram it, before the submarine could bring its superior gun to bear. Class 461 Patrol Craft were designed to get most of their drinking water from an onboard distillation plant. Because of the violent pitching, the distillation plants of the PCs rarely worked. Consequently, the PCs were continuously plagued by a shortage of drinking water.

== Armament ==
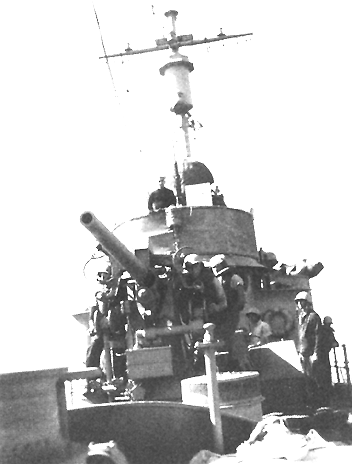
This is a 3"/50 caliber gun mount on an unidentified patrol craft.

Patrol craft were designed primarily for anti-submarine warfare and mine sweeping and the armament reflected this. A secondary group of arms were anti-aircraft. As an antisubmarine warfare ("ASW") ship, it was equipped with both sonar and radar to detect enemy submarines. Once such enemy submarines were detected, the ship's weapons were brought to bear. The ship's radar had a range of around 10,000 yards (9,100 m), as the crew noted during their pursuit of an e-boat in February 1945.

Anti-submarine weapons were the heart of the patrol craft. They consisted of a 3"/50 caliber gun, depth charges, and anti-submarine rocket launchers known as mousetraps.

Patrol craft also had anti-aircraft weapons, including the Bofors 40 mm/56-caliber autocannon, which were either single or double barreled. There were also three 20 mm Oerlikons which was a manually operated air cooled weapon mounted on a pedestal.

== Operations ==
PC-552 protected numerous convoys up and down the east coast and the Caribbean, as well as Convoy UGS-29, as part of Task Force 69. It also screened for the Battle of Normandy fleet. During this period, it made contact with suspected enemy submarines many times, vigorously attacking them each time. It was credited with just one kill, but that is not certain. Although PC-552 suffered air attack numerous times, it had only one surface-to-surface engagement with a German E-Boat 6–7 February 1945. In this case, PC-552 outgunned the target and the engagement consisted of a race. Ultimately, the E-Boat got away.

== Construction ==
Launch of USS PC-552

PC-552 was laid down on 20 May 1941 at the Sullivan Dry Dock and Repair Co. of Brooklyn, New York. It was launched on the evening of 13 February 1942 in the first night launch (which was considered risky) of the Third Naval District so that work could begin to work immediately on a sister ship, PC-553. About 2,000 people attended the launch, about half of whom were the workers who built PC-552. Rear Admiral Adolphus Andrews, Commandant of the Third Naval District and Commander of the North Atlantic coastal frontier said, "Everything connected with this war must be on a 24-hour basis. These night launchings should be the most common occurrence in the world. Not a minute should be wasted in getting out the ships and planes and supplies of every sort that are needed on our many fighting fronts." Grace Finley, the 16-year-old daughter of the office manager of the Sullivan Company, smashed a bottle of champagne against PC-552 as the ship was launched. The keel of the next ship was laid immediately. Although originally scheduled for completion by 12 November 1941, PC-552 was finally accepted on 27 July 1942. Cost was $625,000 ($12.3 million today).

== Deployments ==
=== 1942 ===
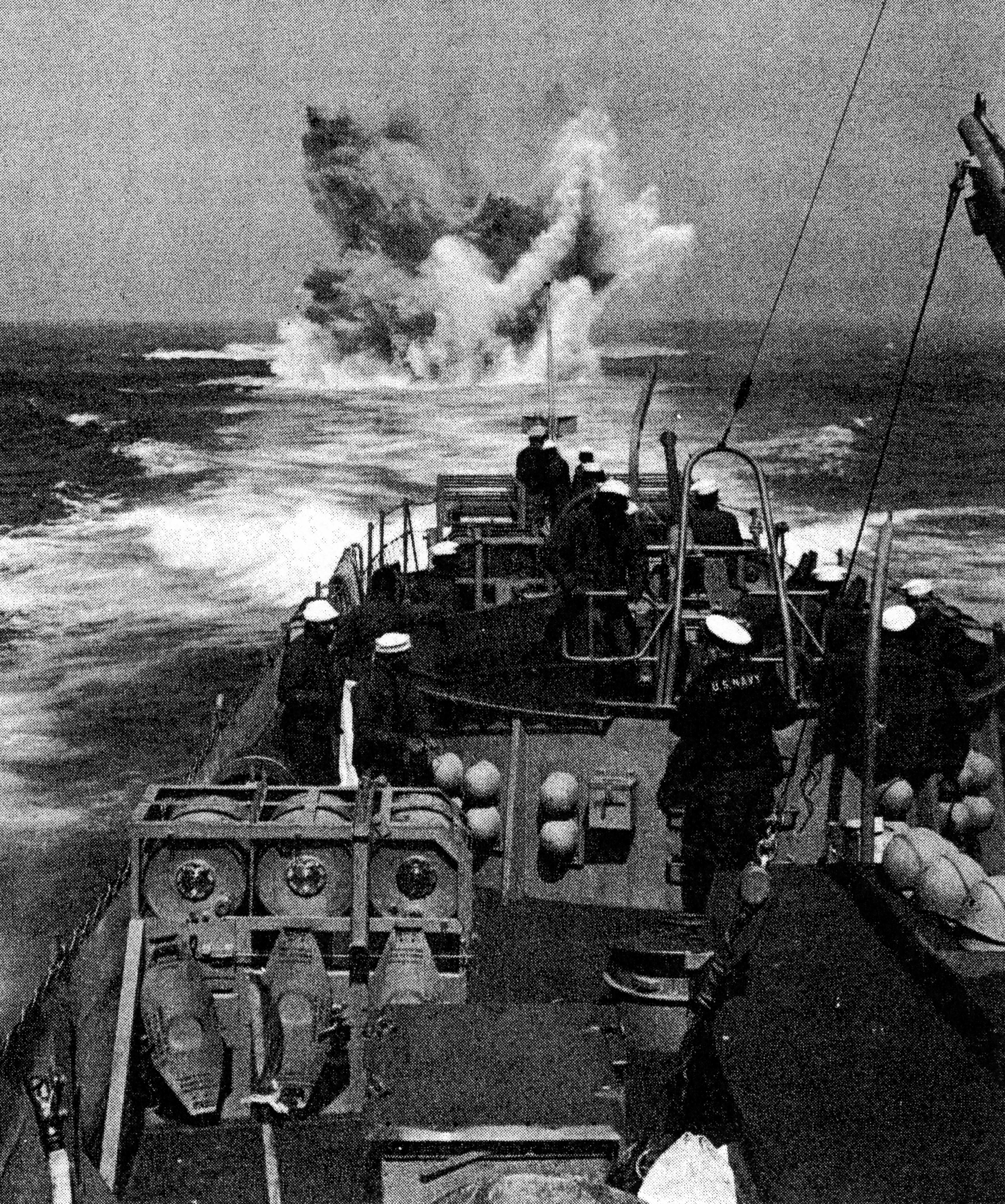
A depth charge explodes astern during a practice anti-submarine run during the USS PC-1264's shakedown tests.

The USS PC 552 was commissioned on 29 July 1942, Lt. Donald McVickar, USNR commanding. By 12 August, the ship was underway for the first time in New York Harbor. The first few months were spent shaking down the ship, calibrating the engines, steering communication, guns, etc. The next month was spent training against American submarines. The first combat mission was in September during which the ship engaged with suspected German submarines. For most of the remainder of the year, the ship screened convoys between Tompkinsville, Staten Island, New York and Guantanamo Bay, Cuba, berthing primarily at both places. There were several contacts with suspected enemy submarines which were attacked vigorously but no proof of destruction.

Beginning 20 September 1942, PC-552 had her first convoy escort patrol. The next day PC-552 made contact was with a submarine attacking when contact was made again on 22 September. An aircraft assisted and an oil slick was observed, but there was no proof the attack was successful. On 27 September 1942, the ship berthed at Guantanamo Bay, Cuba.

PC-552 was underway again 29 September returning to Tompkinsville 7 October 1942 and picked up additional crew. PC-552 returned to Guantanamo Bay with another convoy, 11 to 18 October 1942. On 20 October the ship visited Santiago de Cuba. On 21 October, on the way back to Guantanamo Bay PC-552 engaged a possible submarine, but lost contact.

On 15 November 1942, PC-552 departed with a convoy bound for Tompkinsville. On 23 November, they made contact with suspected enemy submarine. A six and one-half hour engagement was made against the contact with the help of HMCS Halifax (K237) and an airplane. Multiple depth charges were dropped by the group. Eastern Sea Frontier command classified this as a likely submerged wreck and noted the attacks on old wrecks were common enough to consider attaching buoys to wrecks to prevent additional attacks. On 24 November 1942, PC-552 arrived at Tompkinsville.

On 28 November 1942, "Lt. J.R. Pilling, Jr. USNR relieved Lt. D McVickar USNR as commanding officer."

On 18 December 1942, PC-552 departed with a convoy dropping depth charges on a possible submarine contact, but contact was lost. They arrived and berthed at Guantanamo Bay on 25 December 1942.

=== 1943 ===
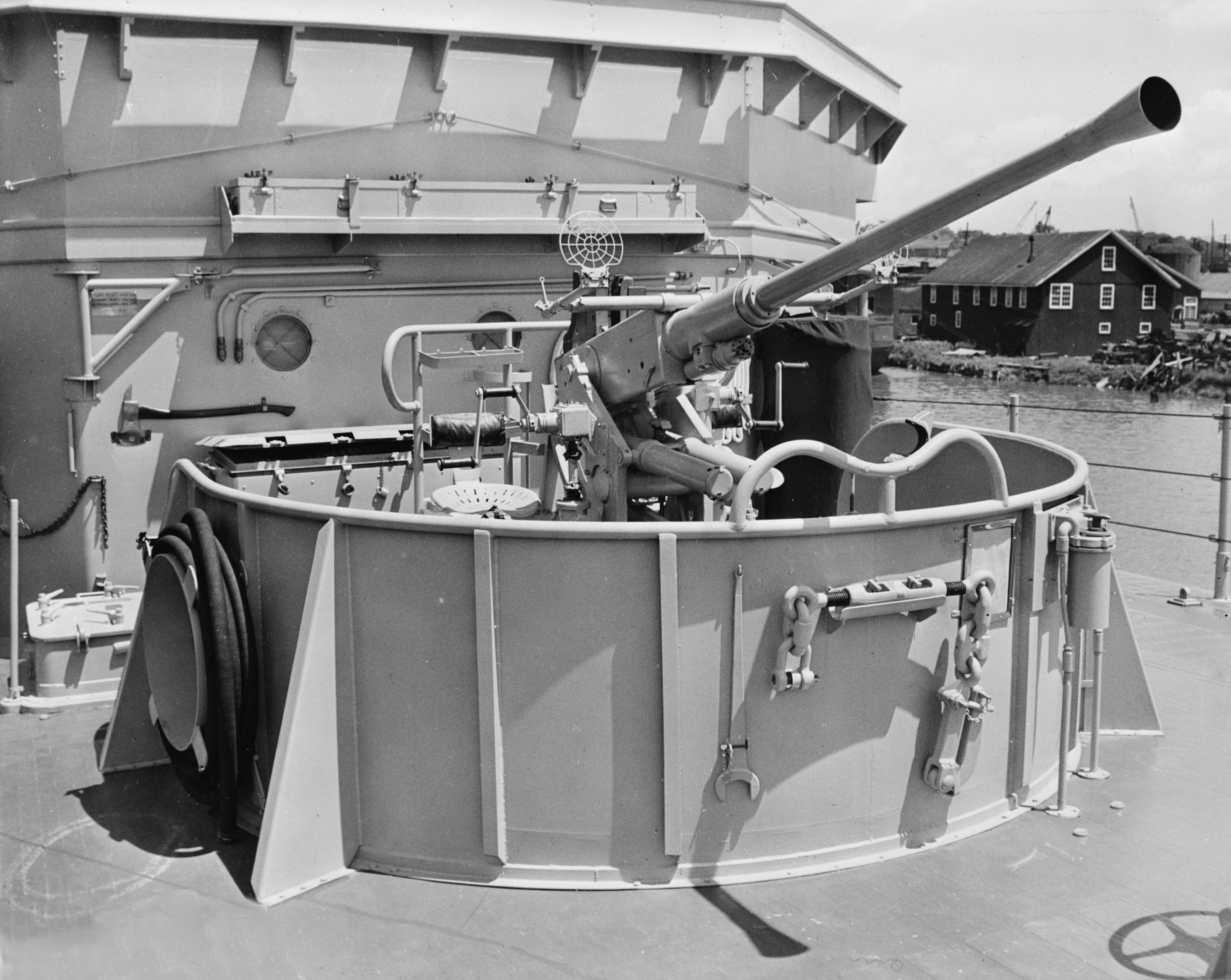
This is a typical Bofors 40 mm/56 caliber machine gun for a ship (USS Valor (AM-472)).

PC-552 performed protection for convoys going from New York (berthed at Tompkinsville) to Guantanamo Bay, Cuba and back. For the most part, serious maintenance was performed at Tompkinsville such as replacing guns. Tompkinsville was also the main source for ammunition and new personnel. The first half of the year was similar to how 1942 was: periodic contacts with potential enemy submarines resulting in instant attacks by PC-552, great care given to zigzagging convoys, detailed deck log entries, etc. These were anxious, serious men at an anxious, serious task. The last half of the year, the convoys became routine. There were no contacts with potential enemies, there were less frequent convoys, and the deck log entries became cursory. Often, not even the name of the mooring station was mentioned. It apparently was obvious to all at the time where they berthed although not to us, reading the deck log entries today.

While on convoy patrol, PC-552 is believed to have killed a Nazi submarine on 15 May 1943 at 2300 hours. The ship was given credit for a possible kill in company with another PC (not clear this is the same incident).

PC-552 left Tompkinsville bound for Guantanamo Bay on 11 January 1943 screening a convoy. While en route on 17 January, PC-552 deployed a boarding party to ship #33 in the convoy retrieving them on the 18th and entering Guantanamo Bay the same day. PC-552 went on a one-day special sea detail on the 19th and departed 21 January 1943 with a convoy bound for Tompkinsville. On 22 January 1943, PC-552 dropped several depth charges on a possible submarine contact, arriving 27 Jan 1943 at Tompkinsville, Staten Island.

From 7 to 14 February 1943 PC-552 made another trip to Guantanamo Bay with a convoy returning to Tompkinsville 17 to 26 February. From 11 to 17 March 1943, PC-552 made a trip to Key West with a convoy returning to Tomknisville 22 to 28 March 1943.

2 to 9 April 1943, PC-552 sailed to Guantanamo Bay with another convoy. The trained with an American submarine on 12 April and returned to Tompkinsville 14 to 20 April 1943. PC-552 engaged possible submarine contacts 15 and 20 April, without proof of success. 2 to 9 May 1943, PC-552 sailed to Guantanamo Bay returning to Tompkinsville 14 to 22 May. On the night of 15 May 1943, while escorting convoy GN-59, PC-552 detected and engaged a possible submarine contact. There was a major underwater explosion seven minutes after depth charging the contact. The explosion was so large that it knocked out the lights in the engine room of PC-552 and was heard by other convoy escorts over 7 miles away. While the engagement was just south of the Eastern Frontier boundary, the commander there classified it as "Probable submarine, probably killed." At the time, the theory was that the contact was U-176 which had sunk two merchant ships off Cuba two nights earlier. In recent years it was determined that U-176 had been sunk on 15 May, but not at that location and not by PC-552. GN-59 was escorted by PC-552, PC-553, PC-1226 and Restless.

6 to 13 June 1943, PC-552 sailed to Guantanamo Bay returning to Tomkinsville 16 to 24 June 1943. 6 to 13 July 1943, PC-552 sailed to Guantanamo Bay returning 14 to 19 July 1943. 22 to 29 July 1943 the ship sailed to Guantanamo Bay returning to Tompkinsville 2 to 7 August 1943.

On 9 August 1943, PC-552 was transferred back to Eastern Sea Frontier. The remainder of August and September was spent in and out of port underway for a few days each time.

On 2 October 1943, Lieutenant J. Ross Pilling, USNR turned over command of PC-552 to LTJG Frank Pierce.

PC-552 traveled to Guantanamo Bay 5 to 11 October 1943 returning to Tompkinsville. PC-552 spent the rest of the year in and out of various ports without significant incidents and on 17 December 1943, PC-552 arrived into New York from her last trip from Guantanamo Bay. She had been selected to go to France. In Dec 1943, PC-552 was originally assigned to the 8th Fleet (Mediterranean), perhaps without the ship knowing this, then switched to being assigned to the 12th Fleet (Europe).

From 21 to 31 December 1943, PC-552 traveled in the company of Destroyer Escorts (DE) 181, 318, and 225 and the PC's 553 and 1225 to escort the convoy New York Section UGS 28 (United States to Gibraltar-Slow) to Norfolk, Virginia. On 25 December 1943, PC-552 was placed in Portsmouth Navy Yard, dry dock #1 to have bottom scraped and painted, then berthed in preparation for the Atlantic crossing.

=== 1944 ===
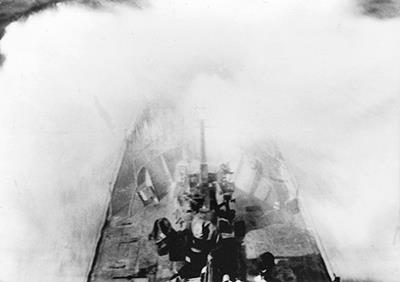
USS PC-552 in heavy seas

During this phase of the war, PC-552 protected a convoy across the Atlantic as the Western Allies built up the naval fleet in anticipation of the Normandy invasion. It then patrolled the European theatre coasts and was based in Dartmouth, Devon, Plymouth, and Falmouth, Britain, then after D-Day, in Cherbourg, France. On D-Day, it served as the control vessel for Omaha Beach.

It was not all over after D-Day. The Germans continued to strafe and lay mines the remainder of the year. The Channel Islands were still held by the Germans which served as a military base from which to launch attacks. There still was a concern regarding enemy submarines.

==== The trans Atlantic crossing to England ====
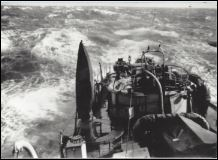
USS PC-552 in rough seas. This picture was taken on D-Day. It shows how rough the seas were. Note the white caps.

Orders came 5 January 1944 for the move to England. PC-552, along with PC-553 and PC-1225 as well as several destroyer escorts, escorted a large, slow-moving convoy across the Atlantic as Task Force 69 for the United Kingdom. The convoy was UGS-29 and consisted of 53 merchant ships, the army tug LT (Large Tug) 221. the LST's (Landing Ship, Tank) 22, 8, and 44, the LCI's (Landing Craft, Infantry) 493-503, and the carrier USS Guadalcanal with escorts. The crossing was very rough.

On 15 January 1944, PC-552 broke off from the convoy UGS-29 approximately 527 miles southwest of Ponta Delgada, Azores, as Task Force 62.9. This task force included the LCI's (Landing Craft Infantry) 493-503 escorted by the PC's 552, 553, and 1225 and headed to Horta, Azores, on Faial Island. The ship's evaporator broke down and PC-552 had little fresh water. From 17 to 22 January 1944, PC-552 stayed at Horta due to bad weather.

From 22 to 27 January 1944, PC-552 sailed to River Tamar at Saltash, Cornwall, England, United Kingdom with Task Group 120.2 as part of the escort for LCI's 493-502. The delayed by weather and although there were several false alarms, the convoy arrived without incident. "This was their (crew and officers') first look at open warfare as they witnessed the German bombings of England's south coast."

==== February to May 1944 ====
PC-552 began European sea duty on 10 February 1944 returning to Plymouth on the 12th. In February 1944, PC-552 was berthed in the River Dart, as well as Falmouth, Cornwall. There were a couple air raid warnings, but PC-552 was not damaged. In February and March, the ship escorted traffic around the English coast as well as protected troop during landing exercises, usually in conjunction with PC's 553 and 1225. On 11 March, PC-552 brought two wounded 16th Infantry Army soldiers on board for treatment, but the more seriously wounded soldier died. Most of the time, when not active, PC-552 was berthed in Dartmouth, Devon, near the Oiler HMS Berta.

"Falmouth, Dartmouth, Plymouth, and Torquay will ever remain in the minds of those who served aboard "552" during this period of preparation. As spring grew into summer, the tension became greater and officers and men were confident that the ship they had made ready and trained aboard would do her bit when the fateful day arrived."

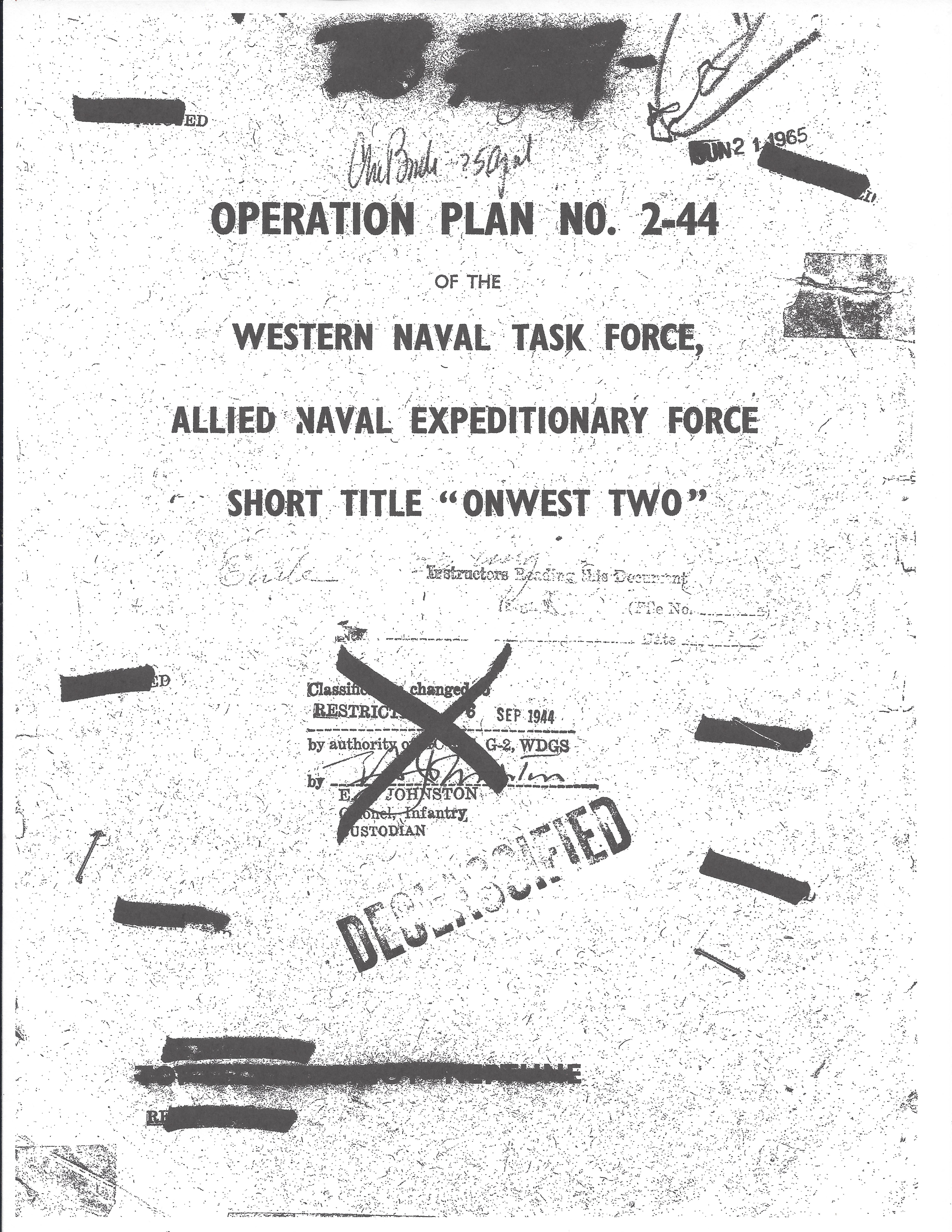
This is the U.S. Navy's 352 page plan for supporting D-Day. This is a complete plan for the ships of the Western Naval Task Force 122. It includes information on how the ships were to come together, how to get ammunition, order of assaulting waves, what to do with the dead, etc ... . "The assault is to be pressed home with relentless vigor regardless of loss or difficulty." "Exploit every advantage gained to the end that unexpected opportunity will not be lost." NOWTF Neptune Monograph, Page 7 of 12. PC-552's call sign was "5Baker8".

April 1944 brought more coastal escorting, screening, patrolling, and military assault and landing exercises, often with PC-553 and PC-1225. Three air raids were sounded in April while the ship was berthed. On 27 April 1944, five Landing Ship, Tanks (LST) were attacked just behind PC-552's convoy. About 400 sailors and soldiers died. Overnight there was sporadic gunfire and illumination fire. On 29 April 1944, PC-552 set her flag at half mast in memory of the Secretary of the Navy Frank Knox and for those lost during the engagement with German E-boats on 27–28 April.

In May 1944 there was continued military exercises including assaults, landings, and escort duty. On 27 May 194, PC-552 was involved a practice operation for D-Day. While escorting a convoy in poor weather and low visibility, PC-552 collided with LCT(5)(R)-439 (Landing Craft Tank (Rocket)-439). PC-552 stayed with the LCT all day, until entering Dartmouth. This incident temporarily shattered the men's hopes. 28–31 May 1944, a Board of Investigation inspected the damage with repairs being made 1–3 June 1944 just days prior to D-day.

==== D-Day ====
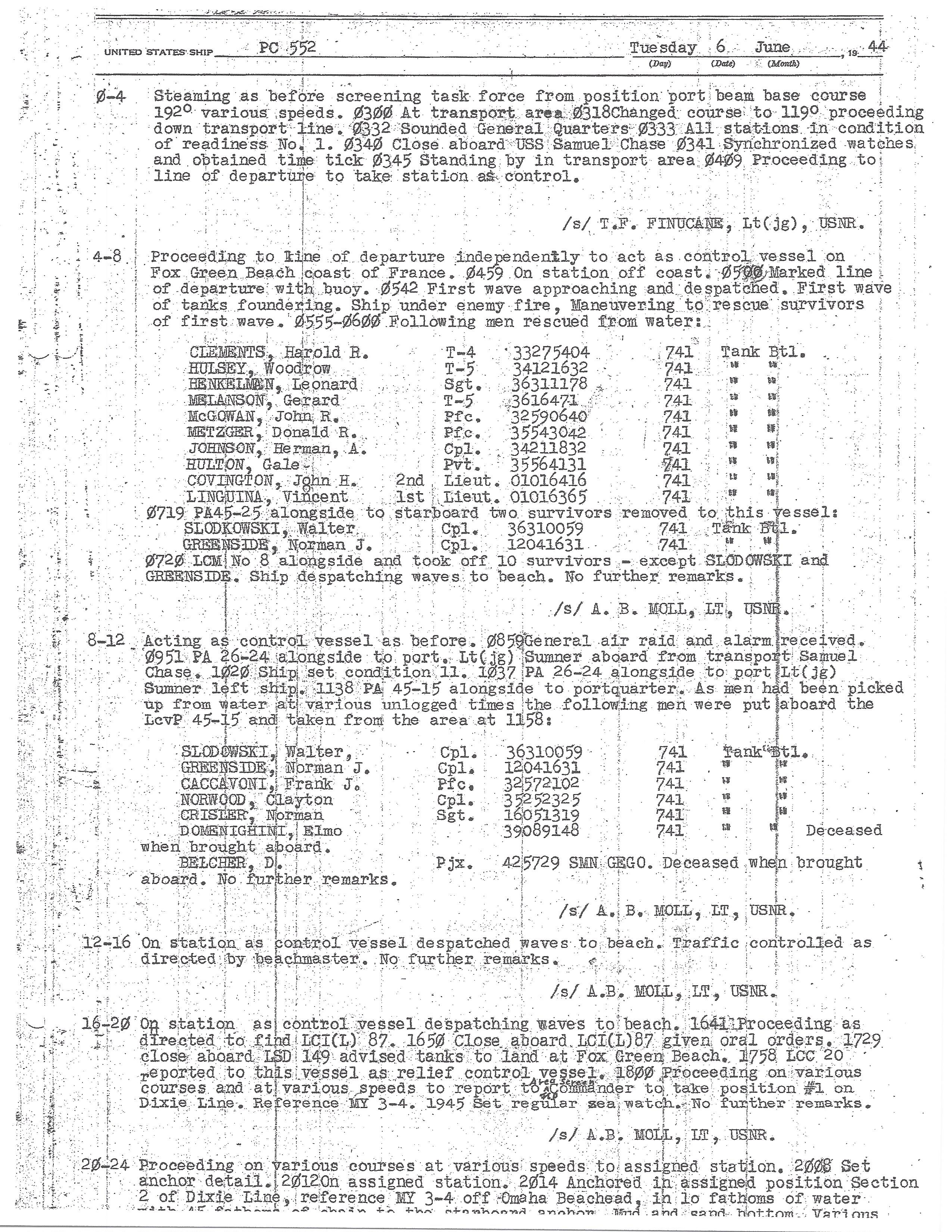
This is a copy of the actual Deck Log of PC-552 on 6 June 1944, D-Day.

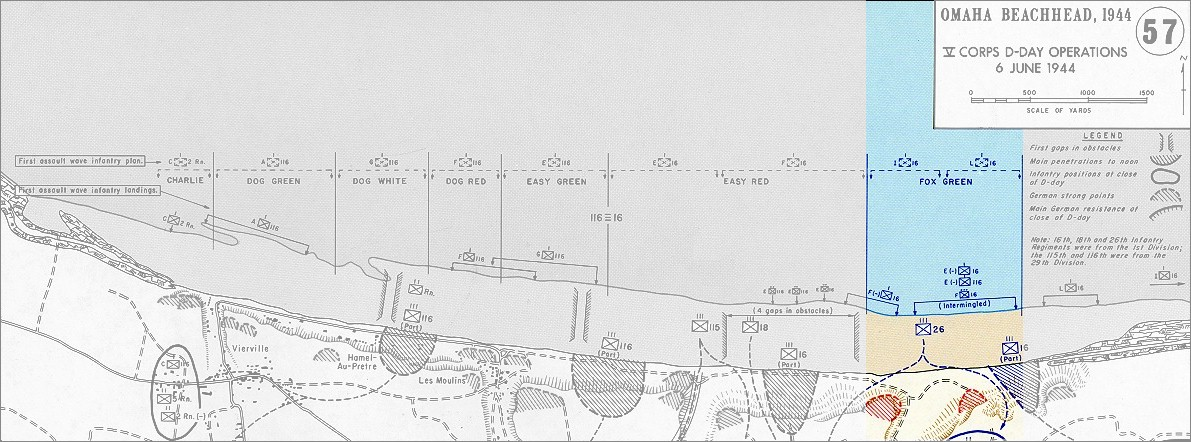
Fox Green beach highlighted on map of Omaha Beach.

On 4 June 1944, PC-552 took on supplies and arrived at Poole Bay to be berthed alongside PC-553. Operation Overlord battle plans, for the invasion of Normandy, were received from the Samuel Chase with limited time available to read and understand them.

... In this force there are battleships, cruisers, and destroyers. There are hundreds of landing ships and craft, scores of patrol and escort vessels, dozens of special assault craft. Every man in every ship has his job. And these tens of thousands of men and jobs add up to one task only – to land and support and supply and reinforce the finest Army ever sent to battle by the United States. In that task we shall not fail. I await with confidence the further proof, in this the greatest battle of them all, that American sailors are seamen and fighting men second to none.

— Naval Commander, Western Task Force, 27 May 1944.

On 5 June 1944, the ships were kept in the dark about the actual timing of the invasion. "The secrecy surrounding the whole thing was uncanny." As the ships began to congregate, the crew did not know whether this was the real thing or another rehearsal. As the number of ships poured in, it soon became obvious. According to crew member Ted Guzda, "We knew when the invasion would come because the channel was so full of ships you couldn't count them. The sea was so rough that when we started we couldn't make it." Executive officer, Lt. Bradley Moll recalled, " ... it was quite a sight to see the task force gathering in the blue-grey channel mist, grouping from various ports, and destined to control one of the beaches on D-Day."

PC-552 began rounding up task force at 0222B and was underway by 0320B. Task force rendezvoused with main assault group at 0930B. Weather was very rough and several ships had trouble keeping station. USS LCT (A) 2043 reported its engine room flooding and was in serious difficulty. PC-552 passed over her only emergency portable pump and the ship was able to continue. At 2225B, ship received an S.O.S from the USS LCT (A) 2229. Ship was taking on moderate seas and was unable to jettison its cargo of tanks. PC-552 took on the Army personnel and the ship was able to survive by leaving station. The convoy proceeded on. According to Ted Guzda, "We turned back to Southampton ... stayed till 2 or so and heard that the invasion was on, we headed back out. We practically led the whole convoy across the Channel. The Augusta was the headquarters of the whole invasion. It was a heavy cruiser. We came alongside and they told us good luck, you're on your own."

"It was not until several months later that the men talked of their humble feelings on that day when they learned that the time for invasion had actually come."

At 0300B on 6 June 1944, PC-552 arrived in transport area off the coast of France setting general quarters at 0332. At 0340, PC-552 synchronized watches with the USS Samuel Chase, and proceeded to her assigned station 4,000 yards from the beach at 0409B. As PC-552 departed, Samuel Chase said over the loudspeaker, "Good luck PC-552. Take your station." Ship proceeded down the swept, buoyed channel, then to her designated line of departure at 0459B. PC-552 buoyed her line of departure for Fox Green beach, then took up station as Fox Green beach Patrol Control Craft ("PCC"). According to crew member, Bill Kesnick, "When we left, they told us, 'God bless you, 552.' They didn't expect us to come back ... "

As a Patrol Control Craft, PC-552 guided and controlled the invasion of Fox Green sector of Omaha Beach, Normandy on D-day. There were 18 patrol control craft in total at Normandy organized as PC Squadron One. During the Battle of Normandy, all PC's were under intense 50 cal. and artillery fire.

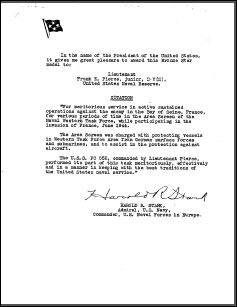
Bronze Star Citation for "Lieutenant Frank E. Pierce, junior, DV(S)" "For meritorious service in active sustained operations against the enemy in the Bay of Seine, France, for various periods of time in the Area Screen of the Naval Western Task Force, while participating in the invasion of France, June 1944." See also, entry for 25 Aug 1944. Courtesy of Frank E. Pierce III (son).

By 0530 on 6 June 1944, the first wave of attackers approached the beach, the 741 Tank Battalion (Duplex drive (DD) Sherman amphibious tanks destined for the eastern half of Omaha were guided by LCC-20). At 0542, the first wave was dispatched. At 0641 PC-552 reported to Samuel Chase that the entire first wave foundered. The waves were too high and many DDs destined for Omaha were swamped and sank while still well off shore. On other beaches the commanders realized the danger and brought their DDs much closer inshore before launching allowing them to reach the shore. PC-552 spent the next 45 minutes picking up survivors, but watched many of the soldiers drown in front of them, helpless to do anything about them. Crewmen Ted Guzda described the scene saying, "We were the control vessel for the first wave of the invasion, they all went down, we picked up all the survivors and threw them on deck." Ted Guzda recalled, "Later we had to sink most of [the bodies]," he said. "We took off whatever identification they had, put weights on them and sank them. There was nothing else we could do." Some soldiers were so weak from exposure, sailors from PC-552 were required to be lowered by rope to the water to place ropes around the soldiers to pull them from the water. Those soldiers did not have the strength to raise their arms to grab hold of the rope.

According to Ted Guzda, "The sea was still rough ... [William Kesnick] lost his helmet while enemy planes were shooting and shore batteries were firing. We were back to back on 20 mm guns. I emptied a bucket of sand and told him to put it on his head and all you heard was shrapnel going ping, ping, ping." Kesnick thought it would be the last day of his life. He yelled, "Hey, Ted, how do you pray?" Guzda replied, "Pray? Willie, just keep that bucket on your head." Sam Raup, another crewmember, said there were bullet holes surrounding him and he was amazed he didn't get hit.

The ship was known as "Rustbucket 552" on the radio circuits. "On this historic day, all hands experienced for the first time, the terrible din of constant gunfire from shore, seaward, and from the air."

During the assault, PC-552 became the focus of enemy artillery fire, was bracketed and within moments of being hit. An American destroyer from the gunfire support group reduced the enemy installation before it could fire for effect. Lt. Moll recalled the incident, "First two short, then one right over us. Figured he had us, but a destroyer had seen enough to locate and let him have salvo after salvo." PC-1261 was not as fortunate and was sunk with significant loss of life by a direct hit by 88 artillery after being bracketed.

PC-552 continued picking up drowning men while under heavy enemy fire. Seven men were rescued, another was picked up, but found dead and another was transferred to PA 45-25. According to Lt. Moll, "Everybody and his brother was firing – cruisers, battleships, destroyers, gunboats, planes – what a holocaust! In the meantime, we had drowning men all around us so were maneuvering to avoid the fire and pick up those poor devils."" Some of those taken from the sea brought death aboard the ship for the first time." According to the after-action report, "PC-552, while under heavy fire, raced to pick up survivors. Because of the frigid water, some of the soldiers became too weak to hold on to lines tossed to them. Consequently, some of the sailors from PC-552 went over the side of the ship to pull the men up. Some of the soldiers required prolonged artificial respiration."

At approximately this same time the sixteen DD tanks forming the first wave for Fox Green Beach were seen approaching the line of departure after having been launched from the LCTs 549 – 602 – 592 - & 601 – 3000 yards to seaward of the line of departure.

At 0533B the signal for despatching the first wave was hoisted and executed at 0535B, however it was noted that the DD tanks were maneuvering with great difficulty and in the area of the line of departure first one and then finally all of the DD tanks were seen to founder. It appeared as though the canvas frame work around the top of the tanks buckled due to wave action and by the time the tanks had reached the area of the line of departure so much water had been taken aboard that buoyancy was lost.
The entire area 200 yards to shoreward and 300 yards to seaward was filled with survivors, some in inflated life rafts, others with life jackets only. At this time the wind was from the west force 3, with a short choppy sea dad (sic) with a current setting easterly at about 2 knots. At 0542B the ship was maneuvered into various positions to try to pick up those survivors who had been unable to get into life rafts and between 0542B.

— PC-552 AAR from, Amphibious Operations Invasion of Northern France Western Task Force, October 1944.

Ted Guzda recalled,

The resistance to the landing was heavy. The beach was not secured till 2:30 in the afternoon ... we lost over 3,000 ... then finally our planes did the job. I couldn't count the number (of) planes that went over. We couldn't sleep. All hell had broken loose. Once the beach was secure we made an imitation harbor by sinking the Liberty ships that brought stuff over. When they got the stuff on the beach they made a breakwater. Then they made a harbor, they brought in concrete caissons and stuck them and made harbor.

At 1620, 6 June 1944, PC-552 was advised that all further tank landings would occur at Fox Green Beach., but PC-552's SCR-609 radio failed and they lost communication with the beach master on Fox Green. PC-552 was relieved of control duties at 1758 and commenced screening operations. At the close of D-Day, 1740B, PC Squadron One, including PC-552, was assigned to patrol the "Dixie Line", a ring of ships to protect the capital ships and transports from submarines and E-boats.

==== D-Day aftermath ====
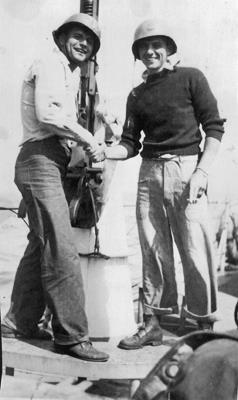
William Kesnick and Ted Guzda on board USS PC-552. Bill and Ted were childhood friends who arranged to be on the same ship and remained close buddies all their lives.

In the days following D-day, PC-552 was attacked by enemy aircraft a number of times, having a near miss from a bomb on 9 June 1944. The ship engaged in routine combat duties, including control of Fox Green beach. At 1835B on 14 June 1944, PC-552 engaged an Army DUKW loaded with Teller mines (German anti-tank mines), it exploded and sank. PC-552 remained in the vicinity of Fox Green beach.

PC-552 lost their anchor at 1326B on 19 June 1944 and was forced to ride out a gale, replacing the anchor with one from a cannibalized craft. From 23 to 26 June 1944, the ship served as dispatch vessel. On 28 June 1944, the crew recovered a deceased sailor and delivered the body to Easy White Beach for burial. From 28 to 30 Jun 1944, they received and escorted Convoy CU-49 (Curaçao to the United Kingdom) which was delivering fuel from Venezuelan refineries.

==== July to December 1944 ====
On 1 July 1944, PC-552 departed the coast of France and moored in Dartmouth to receive supplies, new anchors, and make emergency repairs returning to the fleet on the 3rd. For the first part of July, the ship conducted routine duties including sinking enemy mines with gunfire and covering, identifying and burying a body at sea.

PC-552 returned to Dartmouth and was dry docked 20 July 1944 for a full inspection and repairs returning to duty at Cherbourg on 26 July.

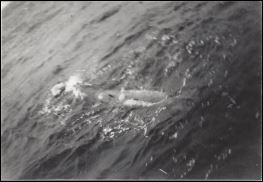
4 August 1944. USS PC-552 found a German human torpedo submarine. Photo includes the dead pilot.

After several days of routine duties, on 4 August 1944 the crew found German human torpedo with a damaged rudder and pilot dead. Ted Guzda recalled, "The Germans used to have these one-man subs and we caught one but didn't take it aboard, we turned it over to an English ship."

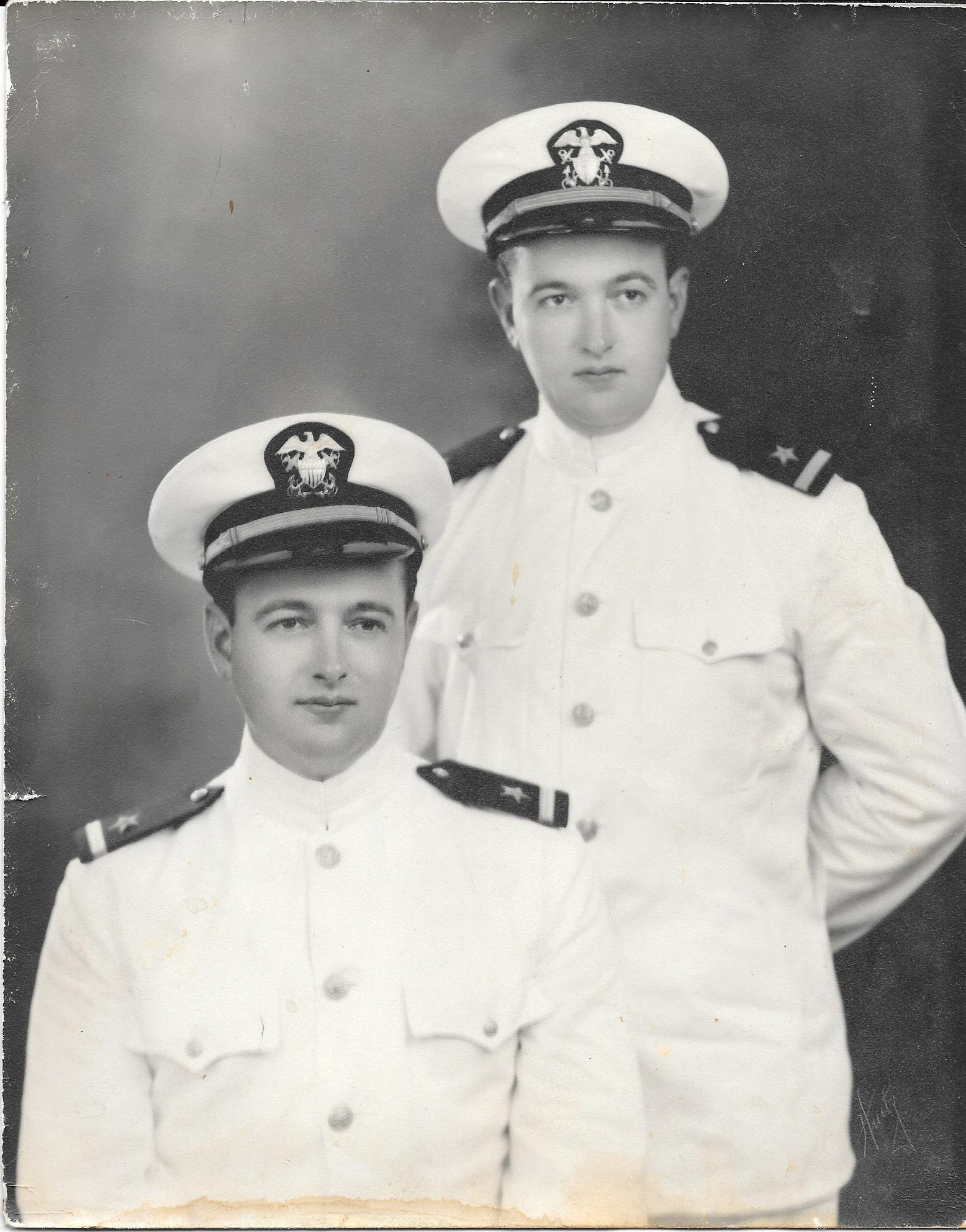
This is a photo of the Moll brothers during World War II. Lt. Graydon Moll is on the left; Lt. Bradley Moll is on the right. Lt. Bradley Moll was the XO of USS PC-552 during the Battle of Normandy and later, the CO. Lt. Bradley Moll left PC-552 January 1945. Courtesy of Brodie Moll, Lt. Bradley Moll's nephew and Lt. Graydon Moll's son.

On 25 August 1944, executive officer Lt. Albert Bradley Moll assumed command of PC-552 from Lt. Frank E. Pierce. At this ceremony, Commander Pierce received the Bronze Star for the action during the invasion.

September, October and November 1944 included mostly routine duties. PC-552 was assigned to patrol of Channel Islands under nasty weather conditions in October.

The first part of December 1944, saw PC-552 performing routine patrol duties. On 24–25 December 1944, PC-552 searched for survivors of Léopoldville, sunk just off Cherbourg harbor by U-486. PC-552 found no survivors in the heavy seas, but PC-1263 recovered several survivors. On 26 December 1944 there was a report of a submarine on surface attacking shipping. PC-552 found two damaged British destroyer escorts, HMS Capel was sinking, but PC-552 towed HMS Affleck back, and directed PT boats to pick up survivors. The attacking submarine, U-486, was not located. PC-552 was now known as "Cherry" on the radio circuit.

=== 1945 ===
The Allies were closing in on Germany proper and all knew the end of the European war was in sight. However, it would have been a mistake to think the fighting was over in the English Channel. The Germans still held the Channel Islands. The Germans remained fighting to the bitter end; with the Germans, it was not over until it was over. A suspected enemy submarine was detected and attacked in January 1945; a raid was launched by the Germans in February which almost resulted in the sinking of a sister patrol craft, the USS PC-564, a fate narrowly missed by PC-552. President Roosevelt died that Spring.

1 January 1945, engaged a possible enemy submarine along with USS Borum, but there was no evidence of success. On 28 January 1945, LT James S. Spielman relieved LT Moll as Commanding officer.

Overnight on 6/7 February 1945, PC-552 foiled an attempted night raid against the allies by the garrison commander of the Channel Islands, Admiral Friedrich Hüffmeier. An escorting Schnellboot ("E-boat") was detected by PC-552. PC-552 intercepted the E-boat, opened fire and chased the E-boat for more than twenty miles before it eventually outran PC-552. The only casualty sustained was the Coxswain, who received a slight bruise on the left foot when struck by an ejected 3" 50 cal. shell case. Subsequently, the successful Granville Raid, led by Kapitänleutnant Carl-Friedrich Mohr, occurred on the night of 8/9 March 1945. That time, the Germans severely damaged the PC present, PC-564, killing many crew members and wounding others.

The rest of February, March and April 1945 were fairly routine. On 14 April 1945, the crew lowered colors to half mast on notice of the death of President Franklin D. Roosevelt.

May 1945 was mostly uneventful, but the German forces on the Channel Islands kept the PC's in the Cherbourg area on constant alert up to the surrender on 8 May 1945. After the German surrender, there were constant rumors from below decks as to where the ship would go from here. On 31 May 1945, TU 122.2.1 was dissolved by order of CTG 122.2 ending the European war for PC-552.

==== The voyage back home ====
The ship went back across the Atlantic June 1945 after being away eighteen months, saluting fallen comrades at Normandy on the way. The ship was actually assigned to the Pacific Fleet, in anticipation of redeployment to the war in the Pacific. Most people expected the war with Japan to continue into 1946 or 1947 (no one knew about the atom bomb) and the ship went through an extensive overhaul prior to joining the Pacific Fleet. Finally, the war with Japan ended prior to the competition of the overhaul; the ship relaxed and was opened to the public for Navy Day.

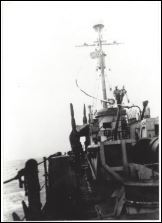
6 Jun 1945. USS PC-552 salutes the Normandy Beaches before starting back home. Note the going home pennant from the mast head to the rear of the 40MM gun tub representing 18 months overseas. Courtesy of William Kesnick.

01 Jun – 5 Jun 1945: Departed Cherbourg, France and arrived and moored at Le Havre, France.

On 6 June 1945, PC-552 departed Le Havre in formation with USS Borum (DE-790), USS Maloy (DE-791) and USS PC's 484, 553, 564, 567, 617, 618, 1225, 1232, 1233, 1252, 1262, and 1263. At 949B, off Omaha Beach, the crew fired a three round salute from 3" 50 Cal., commemorating the first allied assault on the Normandy beaches and a similar salute at 1103B off Utah Beach before departing for the Azores.

"Although the war was still in full force on the other side of the world, the voyage to the U.S. was much like a pleasure cruise, using running lights, being able to smoke on open decks, and even being favored by a calm sea and fair winds."

Arriving 11 Jun 1945 at Horta, Fayal Island, Azores departing the next day for Bermuda. Borum and Maloy left the convoy bound for New York at 2125B on 16 June 1945. PC-552 and remainder continued on in formation for Bermuda. PC-552 arrived in Bermuda the next day. On 18 June 1945, PC-552 was to depart with the group for Key West, but the port main engine broke down and they returned to Bermuda for repairs with the convoy leaving them behind. On 19 June 1945, they departed for Key West, Florida arriving 22 June.

On 20 June 1945 probably not known to the crew, the ship was assigned to the Pacific Fleet as part of Service Squadron ("ServRon") Two.

This is the first page of the Navy's official Ship's History of PC-552. Although the entire report is only three pages long, it provides a sense of the emotions of the crew.

From 23 to 30 Jun 1945, work began on the ship for an assigned industrial availability and unloaded all munitions. On 9 July 1945, PC-552 departed for Charleston, South Carolina accompanied by PC-553 and PC-1225, arriving 11 July 1945 remaining there through August and September. After eighteen months overseas, the ship underwent a complete overhaul in preparation for the war in the Pacific against Japan. Japan's surrender was announced 15 Aug 1945 before the ship completed its overhaul.

PC-552 was accidentally rammed by PC-553 during a transfer to another berth sustaining minor damage. In September, now that the war with Japan was over, the ship was transferred to the Atlantic force (ACTIVE Lant), ACTIVE in this case as opposed to reserve duty.

On 21 October 1945, PC-552' departed Charleston for Stamford, Connecticut. arriving 24 October for a Navy Day celebration. The ship was open for inspection for Navy day for a period five days. About 10,000 interested people boarded her during that period.

The fleet, on V-J Day (Victory in Japan Day), consisted of 1200 warships, more than 50,000 supporting and landing craft, and over 40,000 navy planes. By that day, ours was a sea power never before equaled in the history of the world. There were great carrier task forces capable of tracking down and sinking the enemy's fleets, beating down his air power, and pouring destruction on his war-making industries. There were submarines which roamed the seas, invading the enemy's own ports, and destroying his shipping in all the oceans. There were amphibious forces capable of landing soldiers on beaches from Normandy to the Philippines. There were great battleships and cruisers which swept the enemy ships from the seas and bombarded his shore defense almost at will.

— Harry S. Truman, on Navy Day, 1945

On 30 October 1945, PC-552 sailed to Tompkinsville, Staten Island. The ship was back again operating in those same waters in which she had begun just three years before. For the remainder of the year the ship was in and out of New London and Groton, CT training with submarines returning from the Pacific.

=== 1946 ===
By now, the writing was on the wall. PC-552 marked time until the government decided what to do with it. Sailors left the ship as they were honorably discharged and not replaced. When the ship made its final voyage, it was under-crewed by a third. The ship was decommissioned 18 April 1946. As of 2015, the final fate of the ship has not been determined. There was a huge push to convert the U.S. economy from a war basis to a peace time basis. People were flush with money but could not buy anything and people wanted houses and cars. Many patrol craft were immediately scrapped and the steel entered the peace time economy.

From January to March 1946, the ship conducted minor training exercises, test runs and spent time in Newport, RI. On 30 March 1946, PC-552 began her final voyage as a commissioned Navy ship, traveling to Charleston, SC by 2 April 1946 to unload ammunition and be decommissioned. On 8 April 1946 LTJG Robert E. Gleason, relieved LT James S. Spielman as Commanding Officer of PC 552."

== Decommissioning and fate ==
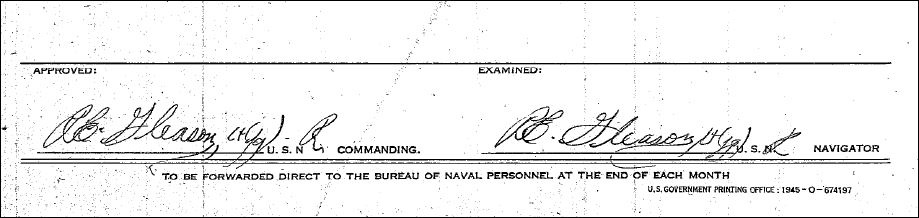
LtJG R.E. Gleason, Commanding Officer The last signature of the last Commanding Officer of USS PC-552. This is the signature which decommissioned the ship. Source: Deck Log April 1946

On 18 April 1946, the decommissioning party came aboard under LTJG Wells, USNR, to make final inspection at 0900. At 1100 the ship was under tow to an anchorage in Wando River, Charleston. At 1650, PC-552 was moored alongside PC-1214. At 1705, LTJG Gleason placed the ship out of commission in accordance with Com 6 letter of 18 April 1946, Serial PC/A4-1/NB.

On 17 May 1946, ex-PC-552 was deemed non-essential and authority was given to dispose of the vessel. (Note: CNO Letter S/N 3069P414, 17 May 1946) On 5 June 1946, the ship was stricken from the Navy register. On 5 December 1946, ex-PC-552 was delivered to the U.S. Maritime Commission, the predecessor to the Maritime Administration (MARAD), Port Representative at Charleston, South Carolina, "for disposal per Base 6ND letter" dated 5 Dec 1946. No record has been found as to her ultimate destiny. The Maritime Administration has no record of ever receiving the ship. There is no record of her being sold or transferred to a foreign country as many of the PCs were. There is no record of her being sold to private hands. The Maritime Administration did not keep records of what happened to these ships after they were sold, for those which were sold. Many were cut up for scrap and that was probably her fate. Research continues.

== Awards and honors ==
Unit awards and citations PC-552 received:

PC-552 was damaged at the Battle of Normandy and was awarded a Service star for action there.

In addition to unit awards and individual medals earned for unusual efforts, most men of the PC-552 probably received all of the following medals:

- – The World War II Victory Medal (United States) medal was awarded to any member of the United States military, including members of the armed forces of the Government of the Philippine Islands, who served on active duty, or as a reservist, between 7 December 1941 and 31 December 1946.
- – The European-African-Middle Eastern Campaign Medal recognized those military service members who had performed military duty in the European Theater (to include North Africa and the Middle East) during the years of the Second World War.
- – The American Campaign Medal recognized those military members who had performed military service in the American Theater of Operations during World War II. A similar medal, known as the American Defense Service Medal was awarded for active duty service prior to the United States entry into World War II. Some crew members received that medal, also.

== Notes ==
=== Sources for deployments ===
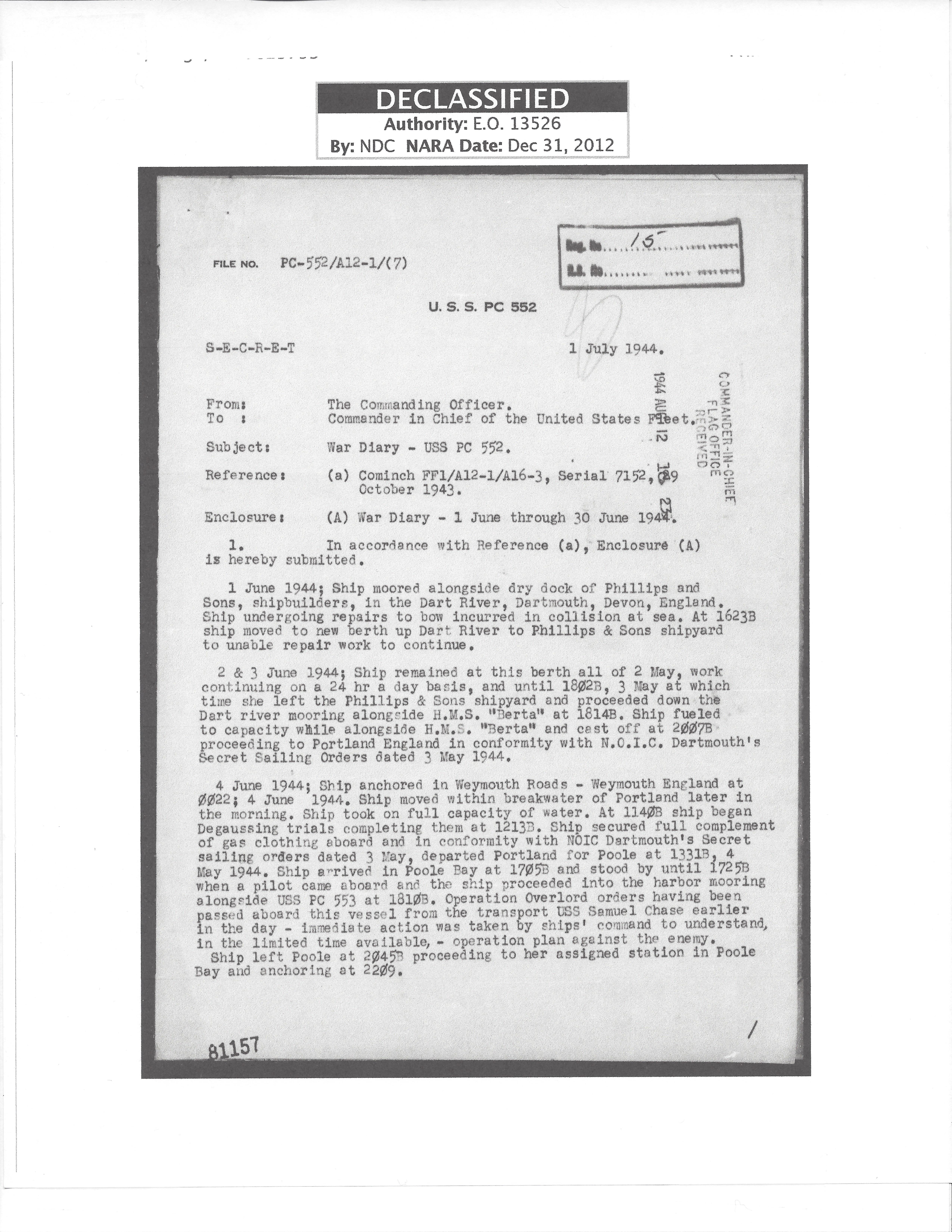
This is the cover page of the War Diary of the PC-552 for the month of June 1944, which included D-Day.

The primary source for the deployment section was the "War Diary of the USS PC 552". On 29 Oct 1943, the US Navy issued order FF1/A12-1/A16-3, Serial 7152 which directed the commanders of all Navy ships in combat to write war diaries to preserve for history the experience of the ships and their crews. The war diary for PC-552 stretches from 21 Dec 1943 to 30 Jun 1945. Also written were official after battle reports, action reports, and other such reports. All these documents were originally classified as "Secret" but were declassified 31 Dec 2012. They are now maintained in microfiche form at the National Archives and Records Administration. A copy resides at the Bay County Historical Society Museum-PCSA Collection, MI.

Another important source were the daily "Deck Logs of the USS PC-552". That is the formal name of what laymen typically refer to as the "Ship's Log". They begin upon the commission of the ship, 29 Jul 1942, and end on the decommissioning of the ship, 18 Apr 1946. They were handwritten by various watch officers on a rocking and pitching ship until 1 Jun 1944 and deciphering them can be quite challenging. After that, they were typed. For some reason, the month of December 1943 has been lost. The Deck Logs also are now maintained in microfiche form at the National Archives and Records Administration. A copy of the Deck Logs also resides at the Bay County Historical Society Museum-PCSA Collection, MI.

A brief but important source is the "Ship's History". This report is only three pages long but it is the best source for understanding the emotions of the crew during its ordeal. It covers the period from 29 Jul 1942 to the "end of 1945". It was most likely written by, or at the direction of, the commander at that time, Lt. James Spielman and was dated 23 March 1946.

It is good to remember that all these documents were written by humans, who used human judgment as to whether to note something. For example, once in Europe, German air raids and picking up dead bodies from the sea were fairly common occurrences. At some point, they became too common to report. The Deck Log might mention an air raid on one day but the War Diary might make no mention of it. A week later, the opposite might be true. The clearest picture comes from reading all the documents.

== Further reading and other resources ==
- Admiralty, S.W.I.(UK) Naval Intellidence Division, N.I.D 08408/43 (December 1943). C.B.04051 (90) "U 470" "U 533" Interrogation of Survivors (Property of His Majesty's Government).
- Bay County Historical Society Museum-PCSA Collection (http://www.bchsmuseum.org/id29.html)
- Bureau of Naval Personnel, Naval Orientation, NAVPERS 16138-A, December, 1948.
- Domenech, Dr. Ligia T., Imprisoned in the Caribbean: The 1942 German U-Boat Blockade: iUniverse. (2014). ISBN 978-1-4917-5270-8
- Fishgold v. Sullivan Drydock & Repair Corporation et al., Legal Information Institute (LII), Cornell University Law School.
- Kershaw, Robert J. D-day : Piercing the Atlantic wall. Annapolis, Md.: Naval Institute Press. (1994). ISBN 1-55750-151-3.
- Operation Plan No. 2-44 of the Western Task Force, Allied Naval Expeditionary Force. Short Title "Onwest Two", 21 Apr 1944.
- Patrol Craft Sailors Association (www.ww2pcsa.org)
- Porier, Michel Thomas, Commander, USN, Results of the German and American Submarine Campaigns of World War II, Chief of Naval Operations-Submarine Warfare Division, 20 Oct 1999.
- Spielman, James S., U.S.S.PC 552 Ship's History, 23 Mar 1946.
- Stillwell, Paul (editor). Assault on Normandy: First Person Accounts From the Sea Services (1. print. ed.). Annapolis, Md.: Naval Inst. (1994). ISBN 978-1-55750-781-5.
- Veigele, Wm. J. PC patrol craft of World War II : a History of the Ships and Their Crews (1st ed. ed.). Santa Barbara, CA: Astral Publ. (1998). ISBN 978-0-9645867-1-0.
- Williams, Greg H., World War II US Navy Vessels in Private Hands. Jefferson, North Carolina: McFarland & Company, Inc. (2013). ISBN 978-0-7864-6645-0.
