= Eberhard Graf von Schmettow =

German general

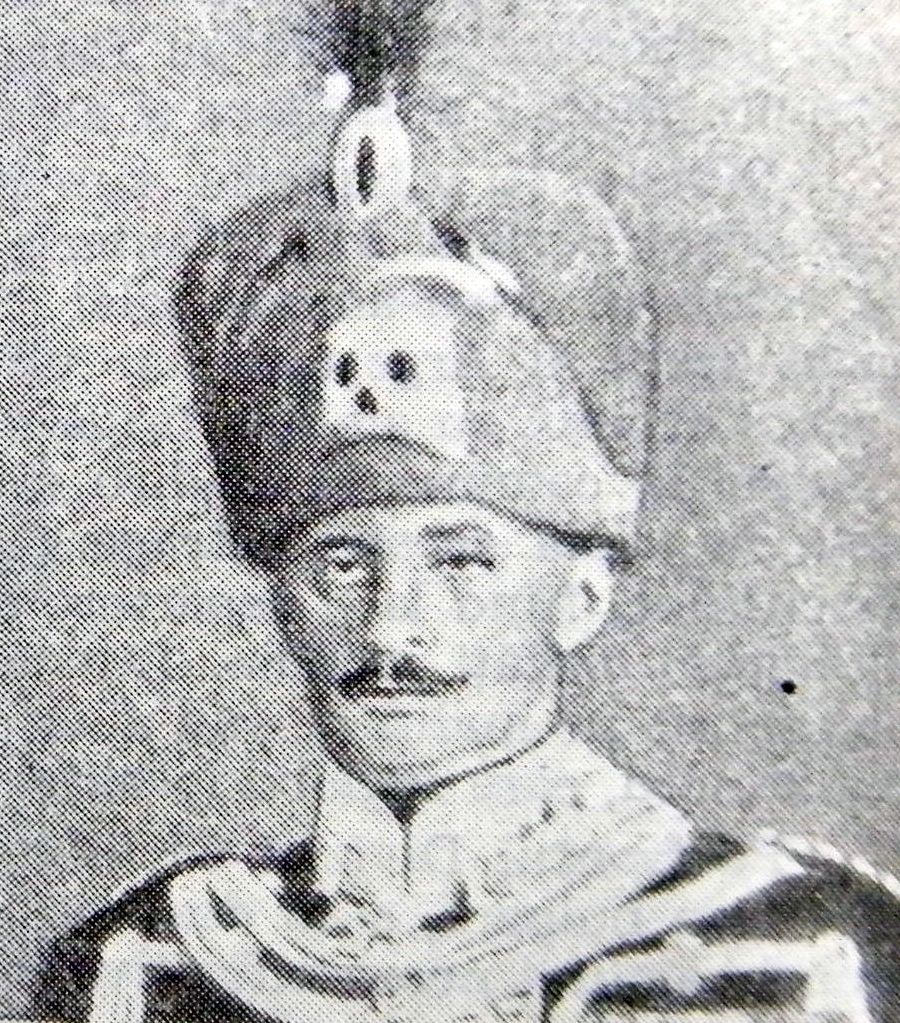
- Born: Bernhard Gottfried Max Hugo Eberhard von Schmettow; 17 September 1861; Halberstadt, Province of Saxony, Kingdom of Prussia, German Confederation
- Died: 31 January 1935 (aged 73); Görlitz, Province of Lower Silesia, German Reich
- Military career
- Allegiance: German Empire
- Branch: Imperial German Army
- Service years: 1881–1919
- Rank: Generalleutnant
- Commands: 1st Life Cuirassier Regiment; 5th Cavalry Brigade; Guards Hussar Brigade; 9th Cavalry Division; 8th Cavalry Division; Cavalry Corps Schmettow; 65th Corps z.b.V.
- Conflicts: World War I: Romanian campaign; Battle of Transylvania; Battle of Bucharest; Battle of the Argeș; Western Front; Second Battle of the Aisne; Third Battle of the Aisne; Second Battle of the Marne
- Awards: Order of the Red Eagle; Pour le Mérite with oak leaves

Bernhard Gottfried Max Hugo Eberhard, Graf von Schmettow, usually shortened to Eberhard Graf von Schmettow, (17 September 1861 – 31 January 1935) was a German officer of the Prussian Army, adjutant general of Kaiser Wilhelm II and Lieutenant General of the Imperial German Army in World War I.

== Biography ==
Eberhard von Schmettow was born in Halberstadt, Prussia, as son of Maximilian Graf von Schmettow on 17 September 1861. In 1881 he joined an Uhlan regiment of the Prussian Army and spent the next 25 years as cavalry and staff officer; also serving as an aide-de-camp to Emperor Wilhelm II. He became commander of the 1st Life Cuirassier Regiment in 1906, of the 5th Cavalry Brigade in 1911 and of the Guards Hussar Brigade in 1912. Von Schmettow was promoted to Generalmajor in January 1913.

When World War I began General von Schmettow was briefly on the Western Front before being sent to the Eastern Front, given command of the 9th Cavalry Division and, in 1915, the 8th Cavalry Division. In August 1916 he briefly commanded the 195th Infantry Division and was promoted to Generalleutnant. He was assigned to lead the newly created Cavalry Corps Schmettow as part of the 9th Army during the Romanian campaign. It initially consisted of the remnants of the 3rd Cavalry Division, the 1st Austrian Cavalry Division and the 51st Hungarian Honved Infantry Division. For his services in the campaign Schmettow received the Pour le Merite.

In early 1917 Schmettow and his corps were transferred to the Western Front and made up of the 6th and 7th Cavalry Divisions. Shortly afterwards the corps changed, dismounting and exchanging most of the mounted units as cavalry was less needed, and was renamed 65th Corps or Gendkdo z.b.V. 65 ("General Command for Special Use 65"). Schmettow fought in the 2nd and the 3rd Battle of the Aisne. Close to the end of the war the corps, by now consisting of the 5th, 50th and 216th Infantry Divisions as well as the 4th Guards Infantry Division, participated in the Second Battle of the Marne. For his services in the latter Schmettow received the oak leaves to his Pour le Merite.

After the armistice General von Schmettow resigned his commission and ended his military service on 22 February 1919; dying in Görlitz on 31 January 1935.

Family

He was married to Agnes von Rundstedt - sister of the famous Wehrmacht Field Marshall - and had three daughters and two sons. Eberhard also was a cousin of contemporary and fellow cavalry general Egon Graf von Schmettow.

One of his sons, Leutnant Maximilian von Schmettow, fell at Cunel in 1918. His other son, Rudolf von Schmettow, served in his father's regiment and later became a general-leutnant in the Wehrmacht. He commanded German troops in the Channel Islands, where his honourable, chivalrous and sensible influence was eventually recognised as key to the relative absence of extremism and oppression during the occupation.

== Dates of rank ==
- 16.04.1881 - Sekonde-Lieutenant
- 15.02.1890 - Premier-Lieutenant
- 15.12.1894 - Rittmeister
- 18.04.1901 - Major
- 10.04.1906 - Oberstleutnant
- 20.04.1909 - Oberst
- 27.01.1913 - Generalmajor
- 18.08.1916 - Generalleutnant

== Honours and awards ==
German orders and decorations

- Prussia:
  - Knight of the Red Eagle, 3rd Class with Bow and Crown
  - Pour le Mérite (military), 11 December 1916; with Oak Leaves, 4 August 1918
  - Iron Cross (1914), 2nd and 1st Classes
  - Knight of the Prussian Crown, 2nd Class
  - Knight's Cross of the Royal House Order of Hohenzollern
  - Knight of Justice of the Johanniter Order
  - Service Award Cross
- Baden: Knight of the Order of Berthold the First
- Brunswick: Commander of Henry the Lion, 2nd Class
- Hesse and by Rhine: Cross of Honour of the Merit Order of Philip the Magnanimous, 24 May 1903
- Lippe-Detmold: Cross of Honour of the House Order of Lippe, 2nd Class
- Mecklenburg-Schwerin: Cross of Honour of the Griffon
- Oldenburg: Officer of the Order of Duke Peter Friedrich Ludwig
- Saxe-Weimar-Eisenach: Knight of the White Falcon, 2nd Class
- Saxony: Officer of the Albert Order
- Württemberg: Knight of the Württemberg Crown, with Golden Lions

Foreign orders and decorations

- Austria-Hungary: Knight of the Iron Crown, 1st Class with War Decoration, 1915
- Kingdom of Bulgaria: Knight of St. Alexander
- Denmark: Commander of the Dannebrog, 2nd Class, 3 April 1903
- Kingdom of Italy:
  - Knight of Saints Maurice and Lazarus
  - Commander of the Crown of Italy
- Russian Empire: Knight of St. Stanislaus, 3rd Class
- Spain: Knight of the Military Merit Order, 2nd Class
- United Kingdom: Honorary Commander of the Royal Victorian Order, 27 February 1905

== See also ==
- Cavalry Corps Schmettow
