= 319th Division =

319th Division may refer to:

- 319th Static Infantry Division, Wehrmacht, Germany
- 319th Division (Israel)
- 319th Rifle Division, Soviet Union

== See also ==
- List of military divisions by number
