= 319th Static Infantry Division =

- 319. (bodenständige) Infanterie-Division
- 319th Division insignia.
- Active: 15 November 1940 – 8 May 1945
- Country: Nazi Germany
- Branch: Heer (Wehrmacht)
- Type: Static infantry
- Role: Coastal defence
- Size: Division
- Garrison/HQ: Guernsey
- Engagements: Granville raid

The 319th Static Infantry Division (German 319. Infanterie-Division (bo.)) was a German Army static division during World War II. It was raised in November 1940 from units of the 87th, 169th and the 299th Infantry Divisions. On 30 April 1941 the 319th Division replaced the 216th Infantry Division in the Channel Islands defense and remained in that position until its capture in May 1945 by British forces.

== Commanders ==
- Generalleutnant Erich Müller (19 November 1940 – 1 September 1943)
- Generalleutnant Rudolf Graf von Schmettow (1 September 1943 – 27 February 1945)
- Generalmajor Rudolf Wulf (27 February 1945 – 8 May 1945)

== Organization (1943–1945) ==
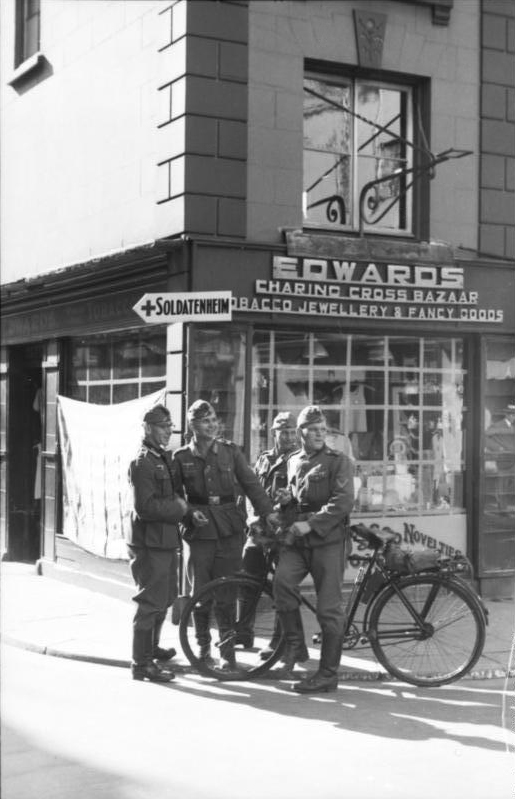
German soldiers in King Street, Saint Helier, Jersey in August 1941.

- Command
- 582nd Grenadier Regiment
- 583rd Grenadier Regiment
- 584th Grenadier Regiment
- 319th Artillery Regiment
- 319th Engineer Battalion
- 319th Antitank Battalion
- 450th Fast Battalion
- 319th Signals Battalion
- 16th Machine Gun Battalion (attached)
- 213th Panzer Battalion (attached)
- Army Coastal Artillery Regiment 1265 (attached)

== See also ==
- German occupation of the Channel Islands
