= Princely Schwarzburg Honor Cross =

Order of merit in Germany, 1853 to 1918

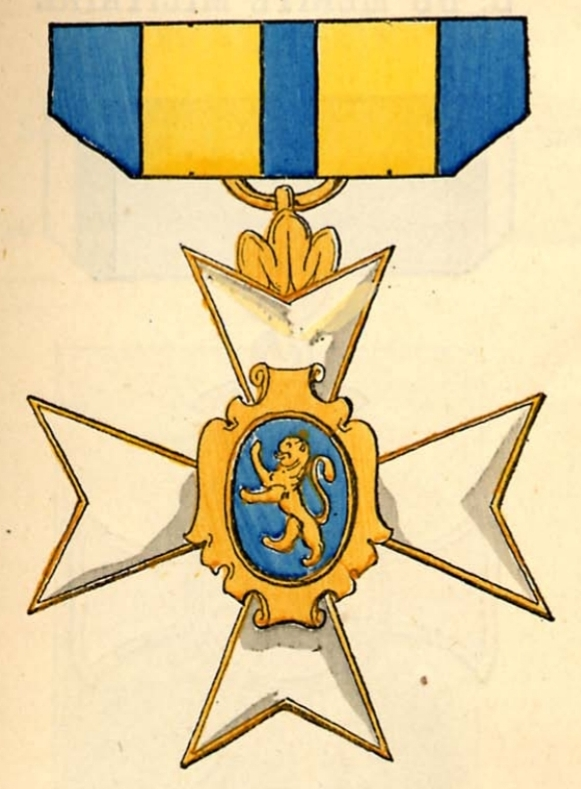
- Awarded for: Military or Civil Merit
- Country: Schwarzburg-Sondershausen & Schwarzburg-Rudolstadt
- Ribbon: Orange ribbon with Dark-Blue centre and edge stripes
- Obverse: Golden lion of Schwarzburg, on a dark-blue background
- Reverse: Reigning Monarch's cipher surmounted by a prince's crown in gold on a dark-blue background
- First award: 1853
- Final award: 1918
- Ribbon bar of the Order

The Princely Schwarzburg Honor Cross was an Order of merit common to the principalities of Schwarzburg-Rudolstadt and Schwarzburg-Sondershausen.

== History ==
The order was founded in 1853 by Friedrich Günther, Sovereign Prince of Schwarzburg-Rudolstadt to reward meritorious service to the Principality. In 1857 the Order became a joint award with the other Schwarzburg principality of Sonderhausen.

The Order was originally composed of three grades of crosses and a medal. In 1866 the grade of medal was divided into a gold and silver medal. In 1870 with the onset of the Franco-Prussian War, Crossed swords were added for wartime military merit, whilst in 1873 the cross was further expanded to comprise four grades of crosses. In 1911 with the merging of Rudolstadt and Sonderhausen the crosses and medals of the order were harmonised.

The 1st class cross of the order could awarded with or without a crown, whilst in 1915 with the outbreak of World War I oak leaves were incorporated into both the crosses and the medals which bore the dates 1914 and 1915. During the war, a non-combat medal for soldiers was introduced, which had a blue ribbon with a red stripe.

== Description ==
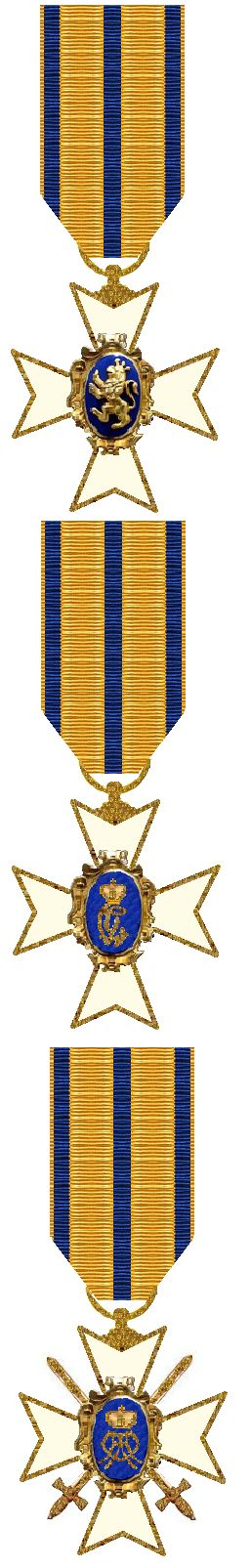
2nd class cross

The first class cross was a large gold cross enamelled in white and worn around the neck it could be awarded with diamonds, a crown, oak leaves, and swords. of these only one award with diamonds is known, it was suspended from a Necklet. The second class was a slightly smaller design, its main difference being that it was suspended from a ribbon on the breast. It was not awarded with a crown, but could still be awarded oak leaves and swords. The third class cross was silver and unenamelled, save for the central badge on the obverse and reverse. The 4th class cross was completely unenamelled with both badges being in silver. the medals were identical in design with both gold and silver medals bearing the Schwarzburg lion on the obverse, with two oak sprays on the lower half, and the legend FÜR TREUE UND VERDIENST (for loyalty and merit), the reverse bears the cipher of the reigning monarch with a prince's crown.

== Notable recipients ==
=== 1st class ===
- Leonhard Graf von Blumenthal (with diamonds and swords)
- August von Werder
- Albrecht, Duke of Württemberg (with crown)
- Dietrich von Hülsen-Haeseler (with crown)
- Friedrich von Scholl
- Hugo von Radolin
- Karl von Wedel
- Gustav von Alvensleben

=== 2nd class ===
- Hermann von François

=== 3rd class ===
- Gerd von Rundstedt
- Gotthard Heinrici
- Günther Blumentritt
- Erich Lüdke (with Swords)
