= Friedrich Hüffmeier =

German naval officer

- Born: 14 June 1898; Kunersdorf, Province of Brandenburg, Kingdom of Prussia, German Empire
- Died: 13 January 1972 (aged 73); Münster, North Rhine-Westphalia, West Germany
- Military career
- Allegiance: German Empire; Weimar Republic; Nazi Germany
- Branch: Imperial German Navy; Reichsmarine; Kriegsmarine
- Service years: 1914–1945
- Rank: Vizeadmiral
- Commands: German cruiser Köln; German battleship Scharnhorst; Wehrmachtbefehlshaber of the Channel Islands
- Conflicts: World War I World War II: Operation Zitronella; Granville raid

Friedrich Hüffmeier (Kunersdorf, 14 June 1898 - Münster, 13 January 1972) was a German Vice Admiral in the Kriegsmarine.

== Family ==
Friedrich Hüffmeier was married to Käthe Bachmann. They had four children, Hans Heinrich Hüffmeier (1934), Friedrich Hüffmeier (1935), Dorothee von Hagen (1936) and Walter Hüffmeier (1939).

== Military career ==
Hüffmeier joined the Imperial Navy during World War I on 16 September 1914, initially as a naval cadet at the Mürwik Naval School. He continued his training on board the large cruiser SMS Freya, and in December 1914 came on the battleship SMS Lothringen, where he was promoted to ensign at sea in 1915 and served until January 1916. Between September 1916 and March 1918, he was assigned to SMS Augsburg. Towards the end of the war, he served during three months as watch officer on the U-19.

In the Second World War, Hüffmeier commanded the light cruiser Köln (from 1 May 1941 to 1 March 1942) and later the battleship Scharnhorst (from 31 March 1942 to 13 October 1943) with which he participated in Operation Zitronella.

In October 1943, he was promoted rear admiral and was appointed until June 1944 head of the office of the Wehrgeistiger Führungsstab at the high command of the Kriegsmarine. This post, which could be compared to that of Political commissar in the Red Army, was responsible for maintaining morale and the National Socialist spirit among sailors.

From 25 July 1944 to 26 February 1945, he was Island commander of the Channel Island Guernsey (Inselkommandant Guernsey). On 26 February 1945 until the end of the War, he succeeded his superior Lieutenant General Rudolf Graf von Schmettow as fortress commander (Wehrmachtbefehlshaber) of the Channel Islands.

Hüffmeier was involved in the planning of the Granville Raid, which took place on the night of 9 March 1945.

He surrendered to the British Army on 9 May 1945 and remained in British captivity until 2 April 1948.

== Sources ==
- Special Camp 11
- oocities
