= Rudolf Wulf =

WW2 German army general (1905-1972)

- Born: 12 December 1905
- Died: 14 November 1972 (aged 66)
- Military career
- Allegiance: Nazi Germany
- Branch: Army (Wehrmacht)
- Rank: Generalmajor
- Commands: 319th Infantry Division
- Conflicts: World War II; Invasion of Poland; Operation Barbarossa; Siege of Leningrad; Demyansk Pocket; Riga Offensive (1944); Occupation of the Channel Islands
- Awards: Knight's Cross of the Iron Cross with Oak Leaves

Rudolf Wulf (12 December 1905 Elmshorn / Schleswig-Holstein – 14 November 1972 Breitbrunn / Bavaria) was a general in the Wehrmacht of Nazi Germany during World War II who commanded the 319th Infantry Division on the island of Guernsey. He was a recipient of the Knight's Cross of the Iron Cross with Oak Leaves.

== Awards and decorations ==
- Iron Cross (1939) 2nd Class (6 October 1939) & 1st Class (27 June 1941)
- Honour Roll Clasp of the Army (25 May 1944)
- Knight's Cross of the Iron Cross with Oak Leaves
  - Knight's Cross on 13 November 1942 as Major and commander of Infanterie-Regiment 422
  - 556th Oak Leaves on 19 August 1944 as Oberst and commander of Grenadier-Regiment 422

Military offices
Preceded by Generalleutnant Rudolf Graf von Schmettow	Commander of 319. Infanterie-Division; 27 February 1945 – 8 May 1945	Succeeded by none
