= Telegram Crisis =

Diplomatic crisis between Denmark and Germany in 1942

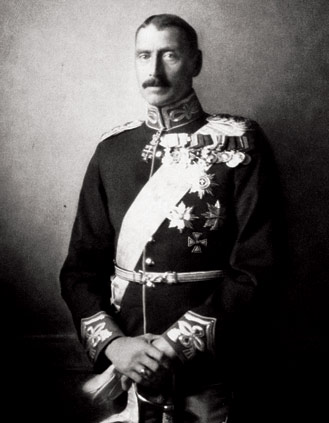
For his 72nd birthday, king Christian X received a congratulatory telegram from Adolf Hitler. The king sent back a formulaic response, which Hitler took as an insult.

The Telegram Crisis was a diplomatic crisis between Denmark and Germany in October and November 1942, during the German occupation of Denmark.

The crisis was triggered by a telegram from King Christian X of Denmark to Adolf Hitler, acknowledging Hitler's congratulations on the occasion of the King's 72nd birthday on September 26, 1942. Hitler was outraged by the perfunctory response of Spreche Meinen besten Dank aus. Chr. Rex (English: "Giving my best thanks, King Christian"). After this perceived slight, Hitler recalled his ambassador from Copenhagen and expelled the Danish ambassador from Germany. Attempts to placate Hitler, including a proposal of sending Crown Prince Frederik to Berlin to apologize to Hitler personally, were refused.

In early November 1942, the plenipotentiary, Cecil von Renthe-Fink, was replaced by Werner Best and the commander of the German forces in Denmark Erich Lüdke was replaced with the more heavy-handed General Hermann von Hanneken, and all remaining Danish troops were ordered out of Jutland. German pressure also resulted in the dismissal of the government led by Vilhelm Buhl and its replacement with a new cabinet led by non-party member and veteran diplomat Erik Scavenius, whom the Germans expected to be more cooperative.

The background to the crisis was not only the famous telegram, but also a growing dissatisfaction in the German leadership—especially Hitler—with their occupation of Denmark, where the resistance movement was starting to be felt.
