= 1st (Silesian) Life Cuirassiers "Great Elector" =

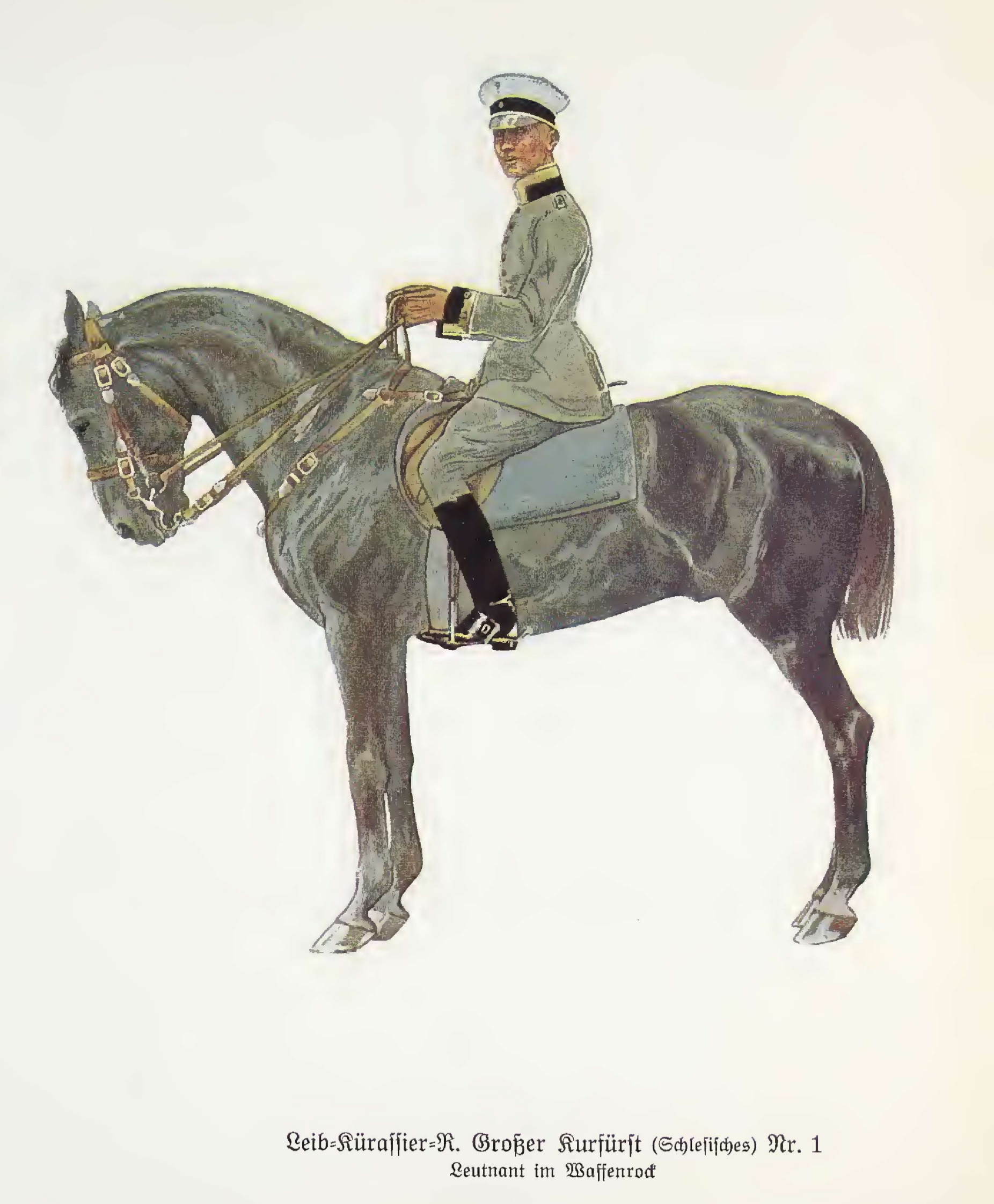
- Active: 1674-1919
- Disbanded: 1919
- Country: Prussia
- Branch: Army
- Type: Heavy cavalry
- Engagements: Silesian Wars and the War of the Sixth Coalition

Commanders
- Notable commanders: Prince Frederick of Prussia

The 1st (Silesian) Life Cuirassiers were a heavy cavalry regiment of the Royal Prussian Army. The regiment was originally formed as Dragoon Guards in 1674 and reorganized as a cuirassiers unit in 1718. The regiment fought in the Silesian Wars and the War of the Sixth Coalition 1813–15, the Austro-Prussian War, the Franco-Prussian War and World War I. The regiment was disbanded in 1919.

Between 1815 and 1863, its commander was Prince Frederick of Prussia (1794–1863).

== See also ==
- List of Imperial German cavalry regiments
