= Erich Lüdke =

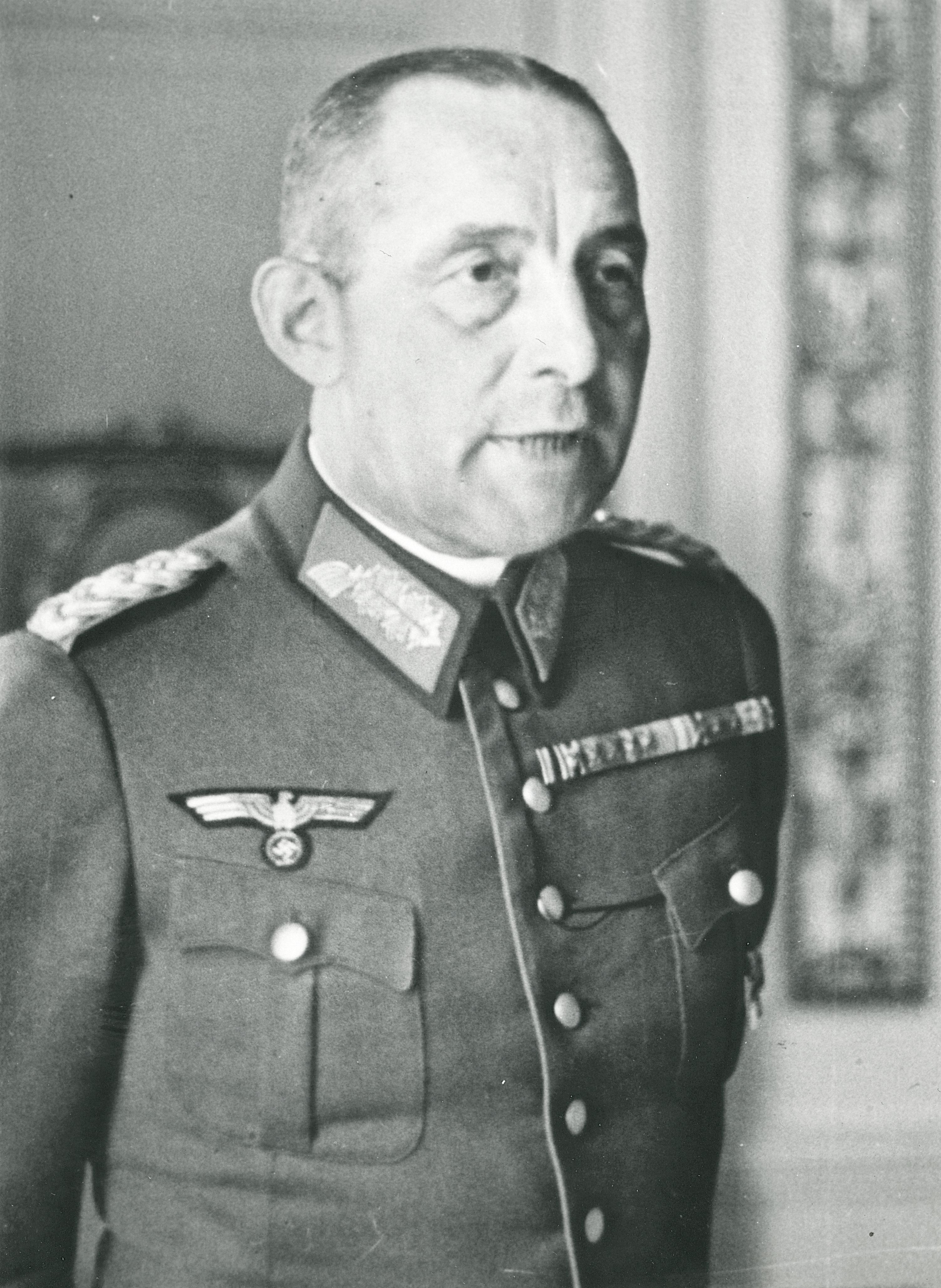
- 1942
- Born: 20 October 1882; Naumburg, Province of Saxony, Prussia
- Died: 13 February 1946 (aged 63); Russia
- Military career
- Allegiance: German Empire (to 1918); Weimar Republic (to 1933); Nazi Germany
- Branch: German Army
- Service years: 1900–1944
- Rank: General of the Infantry
- Commands: Military Commander of Denmark; 9th Infantry Division
- Conflicts: World War I; World War II
- Awards: Iron Cross 2nd Class; Knight's Cross of House Order of Hohenzollern

Erich Lüdke (20 October 1882 – 13 February 1946) was a German General of the Infantry who was supreme commander of the German forces in Denmark from 1 June 1940 to 29 September 1942. Taken into custody by the Soviets after the war, he died in captivity in 1946.

== Early career ==
Lüdke entered the army in 1900 and was promoted to Leutnant in 1902 and to Oberleutnant in 1910. In spring 1914, he was assigned to the General Staff in Berlin. At the outbreak of World War I he was promoted to Hauptmann and became a company commander.

== World War I ==
From 1915, Lüdke served in various staff functions. During the war he received the Iron Cross 2nd Class and Knight's Cross of House Order of Hohenzollern.

== Interbellum ==
After World War I, Lüdke moved into the new Reichswehr and initially used in the Reichswehr Ministry. On 1 April 1922, he was then appointed commander of an infantry regiment and gradually achieved level of Oberstleutnant due to various position of commander of cavalry and infantry regiments.

In June 1935, Lüdke was promoted to Generalleutnant and took command of the 9th Infantry Division. A year later he took command of 34th Infantry Division. In 1937 he was assigned to the X Army Corps in Hamburg. After the death of the commanding general, Wilhelm Knochenhauer, he was assigned to the leadership of X Army Corps.

== World War II ==
On 1 June 1940, Lüdke was appointed commander of German troops in Denmark where he replaced Leonhard Kaupisch. On 1 December 1940 he was promoted to General of the Infantry. His time in Denmark was relatively peaceful, and it was only towards the end of his period in command that the Danish resistance movement was becoming increasingly noticeable.

After the Telegram Crisis, Adolf Hitler wanted a harder line implemented in Denmark and Lüdke was deemed unfit. He was released from his post in the fall of 1942 and given the status of reserve officer. On 31 January 1944, he retired from active service. After the war he was arrested by the Soviets and taken into captivity. He died in Russia in 1946.

== Awards and decorations ==
- Iron Cross of 1914, 1st and 2nd class
- Knight's Cross of the Royal House Order of Hohenzollern with Swords
- Knight's Cross Second Class of the Order of the White Falcon with swords
- Hanseatic Cross of Bremen
- Knight's Cross Second Class of the Ducal Saxe-Ernestine House Order
- Cross of Honour, 3rd class with Swords and Crown (Reuss)
- Cross of Honour, 3rd class with Swords (Schwarzburg)
- Military Merit Cross, 3rd class with war decoration (Austria-Hungary)
- Ottoman War Medal ("Iron Crescent")
- Honour Cross of the World War 1914/1918 with Swords
- Wehrmacht Long Service Award, 4th to 1st class

== Footnotes ==
Military offices
Preceded by none	Commander of the 34. Infanterie-Division; 1 April 1936 – 1 October 1937	Succeeded by Generalmajor Max von Viebahn
Preceded by Leonhard Kaupisch	Military Commander Denmark; 1 June 1940 – 29 September 1942	Succeeded by Hermann von Hanneken
