= Rudolf Graf von Schmettow =

Military Commander in the Wehrmacht

- Born: 8 January 1891; Berlin, Germany
- Died: 28 June 1970 (aged 79); Bad Wildungen, Germany
- Military career
- Allegiance: Nazi Germany
- Branch: Army (Wehrmacht)
- Rank: Generalleutnant
- Commands: 319th Infantry Division; Wehrmachtbefehlshaber of the Channel Islands
- Conflicts: World War I World War II: Invasion of Poland; German occupation of the Channel Islands
- Parents: Eberhard Graf von Schmettow (father); Agnes von Rundstedt (mother)
- Relatives: Gerd von Rundstedt (uncle)

Rudolf Graf von Schmettow (8 January 1891 – 28 June 1970) was a general in the Wehrmacht of Nazi Germany during World War II, who was Commander of the German occupation forces of the Channel Islands and commander of the 319th Infantry Division on the island of Guernsey.

== Biography ==
Rudolf was the son of Eberhard Graf von Schmettow, a Generalleutnant in the Cavalry who commanded Cavalry Corps Schmettow in World War I. His mother was Agnes von Rundstedt, sister of Generalfeldmarschall Gerd von Rundstedt.

At the outbreak of World War II, he was appointed commander of the 164th Infantry Regiment. With this regiment, he participated in the Polish Campaign. At the beginning of January 1940, he gave up command of the 164th Infantry Regiment and was subsequently transferred to the reserve. After the French campaign, he was appointed commander of the British Channel Islands in late August 1940 and took up his post in late September 1940. On 1 April 1942, he was promoted to major general. In early September 1943, he was appointed commander of the 319th Infantry Division, and on 1 April 1944, he was promoted to lieutenant general. In September 1944, he refused to negotiate surrender with Major General Gerhard Bassenge, who was in Allied captivity. On 1 October 1944, he was also appointed Wehrmachtbefehlshaber of the Channel Islands. At the end of February 1945, he had to give up command of the 319th Infantry Division to Major General Rudolf Wulf due to illness. He was then transferred back to the Führerreserve. When the German Wehrmacht surrendered, he was captured by the Western Allies in early May 1945, and released in the summer of 1947. In late summer 1963, he visited his former command area at the invitation of a British television company.

His only son died as a lieutenant on 23 June 1941 in front of Jarosław.

== Sources ==
- Traces of War
- Lexikon der-Wehrmacht
- The island wiki Interview_with_Graf_von_Schmettow (1966)

Military offices
Preceded by Generalleutnant Erich Müller	Commander of 319. Infanterie-Division; 1. September 1943 - 27 February 1945	Succeeded by Generalmajor Rudolf Wulf
