= Hermann von Hanneken (soldier) =

World War II German military general

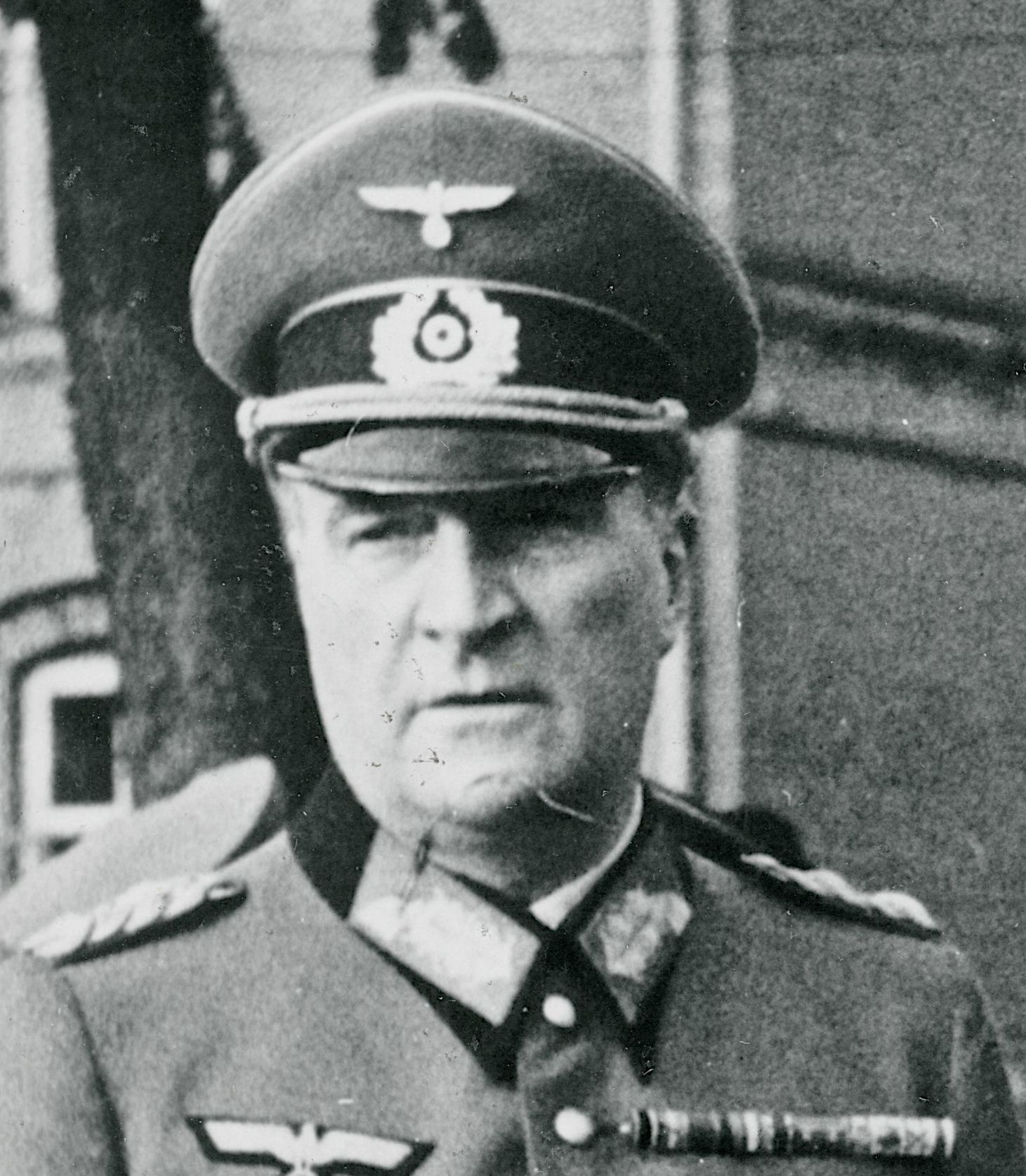
- Hanneken in 1942
- Born: 5 January 1890; Gotha, Duchy of Saxe-Coburg and Gotha, German Empire
- Died: 22 July 1981 (aged 91); Herford, North Rhine-Westphalia, West Germany
- Spouse(s): ∞ 27 September 1911 Anna-Maria Gräfin von Hacke (1892–1911) ∞ 26 June 1915 Celia-Cicita von Soest (1894–1981); 2 children
- Military career
- Allegiance: Kingdom of Prussia; German Empire; Weimar Republic; Nazi Germany
- Branch: Prussian Army; Imperial German Army; Reichsheer; German Army
- Service years: 1908–1945
- Rank: General der Infanterie (demoted to Major in 1945)
- Commands: Wehrmachtbefehlshaber Denmark
- Conflicts: World War I; World War II; Operation Safari
- Awards: Knight's Cross of War Merit Cross with Swords; German Cross in Gold

Hermann Konstantin Albert Julius von Hanneken (5 January 1890 – 22 July 1981) was a German officer who was supreme commander of the German forces in Denmark from 29 September 1942 to January 1945.

== Early life ==
Von Hanneken was the son and youngest child of the Prussian regimental commander Colonel Hermann Ferdinand Sydney von Hanneken (1847–1899) and his wife Emilie Karoline Hertha, née von der Lancken (1856–1914), who came from the house Plüggentin on Rügen.

He first married on 27 September 1911, in Dessau, to Anna-Maria Gräfin von Hacke. She died months later, and he remarried on 26 June 1915 in Berlin, to Celia-Cicita von Soest (1894–1981). Von Soest was the daughter of a factory owner. Von Hanneke was considered to be wealthy by association with his brother-in-law, steel baron Karl Lange, who was also the secretary-general of the Association of the German Machine Industry.

== Early career ==
On 19 July 1908, after education in a cadet school, von Hanneken joined the Königin Augusta Garde Grenadier Regiment No. 4 as a Fähnrich. A little over a year later, on 19 August 1909, he was promoted to Leutnant.

On 1 October 1913 until the start of World War I, he was a part of the Oldenburg Infantry Regiment No. 91.

== World War I ==
Soon after the start of the Great War, von Hanneken became the adjutant of the III. Battalion of the 79th Reserve-Infantry-Regiment until 3 January 1915. von Hanneken was then transferred to the 260th Reserve-Infantry-Regiment as the Regiments-Adjutant, being promoted on 24 July 1915 to Oberleutnant. From 10 July 1916 he served as leader of the regiment's Machine Gun-Company. After 16 November 1916 he was made a temporary adjutant of the 37th Infantry-Division until 11 December 1916 in which he was transferred to the staff of the 78th-Reserve-Division.

On 17 April 1917, von Hanneken into the Department "Foreign Armies" with the Chief of the General Staff of the Field Army. It was while he was during this time, on 15 July 1918, that he was promoted to Hauptmann. On 15 August 1918, von Hanneken was transferred into the Operations-Department of the Supreme Army Command, where he would stay until 24 September 1918. After this point, he was made a General-Staff-Officer of the 88th Infantry-Division.

== Interbellum ==
After the war, in 1918, von Hanneken was among the officers who joined the German Reichswehr. Then he took a job in the Reichswehr Ministry where he was the next year. Then from 1924 to 1927, he was transferred to Reichwaffenamt (materiel command). From 1927 he led troops as a company commander, and it continued until in 1930 when he was promoted to Major. Three years later he was again promoted to Oberstleutnant. From 1935, he had command of a regiment and was thus promoted to Oberst.

A year later, in 1936, he was transferred to Heereswaffenamt (materiel command), where he became Chief of Staff. He was considered a protege of Hermann Göring, from when Goering was choosing who was in charge of the Four-Year Plan. On 3 July 1937, he became responsible for the purchase of iron and steel. On 1 September 1939 he was appointed Head of Section II (Industrial) in the ministry of commercial. In 1940, he received the position as vice Secretary of State. That same year he was promoted to Generalleutnant and in 1941 he was General der Infanterie.

== World War II ==
After the outbreak of World War II, a supply crisis in the iron and steel division caused him problems, and only Hans Kehrl, an economic official, could save him. Delivery time had increased dramatically because over a period of two years von Hanneken had approved supplies that exceeded the amount of iron and steel that could be delivered. Kehrl said nothing about this in its public records, but his caseworker Arnold Köster did in return. Kehrl wrote in his memoirs that von Hanneken was not sufficiently decisive and was afraid of conflict.

von Hanneken was also responsible for addressing the issues of coal to the steel industry. So on 6 June 1941 he raised at the 11th meeting in Generalrat der Wirtschaft the problem that the demand for coal in the last four years had risen faster than supply. The European countries which were dependent on German coal only got 60% of the claimed amounts. From April 1941 domestic coal consumers had to accept a reduction of supplies of around 10%. This led to many closures of companies or reduction of operations. Domestic energy suppliers had to accept a reduction in coal consumption of 20%.

It was reported leading up to September 1940, General von Hanneken, together with Major-General Wilhelm Ritter von Leeb, and Colonel Karl Bodenschatz, wrote an eighteen-page letter to Hitler stating "a serious lack of confidence between the Army and the political rulers of the Reich", less than 20% of commanding officers had confidence of victory, with the subsequent result of Hitler declaring himself supreme commander.

In March/April 1942, von Hanneken was denied responsibility for the distribution of iron and steel, which were transferred to the so-called central planning. As a result of further changes in the tasks of Section II largely transferred to other bodies so Hanneken went on holiday in August 1942 and left Section II in October.

On 12 October 1942, he took over the duties of Erich Lüdke as commander of the German forces in Denmark, where he was considered 'a much more authoritarian type'. He was responsible for defending the invasion and took a tougher line against the Danish resistance movement, which brought him into conflict with the installed civilian administrator Werner Best. (Best had a rivalry with von Hanneken, and the chief of German policing forces, General Günther Pancke.)

On 29 August 1943, von Hanneken imposed martial law in Denmark, and assumed executive powers. It was the result of growing unrest, strikes and sabotage in the months before. He now threatened the death penalty for acts of sabotage. Simultaneously, the Danish army and navy were dissolved and their personnel interned. All privately-possessed firearms had to be surrendered upon penalty of death, and he imposed a nationwide curfew from 9:00 pm to 5:00 am. von Hanneken was made aware of but was not otherwise involved in the action against the Danish Jews in early October 1943 led by Pancke. (von Hanneken had received a telegram that the 'Führer has in principle approved Dr. Best's telegram to immediately solve the Jewish question in Denmark by deportation', and this should occur during the state of emergency.) On 19 September 1944, he backtracked over the dissolution of the Danish police.

In January 1945, he was relieved of his command and replaced by Georg Lindemann. He was accused of corruption, and subsequently sentenced by the German national court-martial to eight years imprisonment. He was, however pardoned by Adolf Hitler who thought that they could not afford the luxury of letting von Hanneken sit in jail. Instead, von Hanneken was demoted to major and sent to the front.

== Post-war ==
At the end of the war, early February 1947, he was located in a POW camp in the British zone, masquerading as an ordinary soldier; From there, he was extradited to Denmark and held awaiting trial. In September 1948, the Danish court sentenced plenipotentiary Best and Gestapo chief Bovensiepen to death, police chief Panke to twenty years imprisonment, and von Hanneken to eight years. He was acquitted on 9 May 1949, expelled from Denmark, and lived thereafter a quite low-profile lifestyle until his death in 1981.

== Promotions ==
- 19 March 1908 Charakter als Fähnrich (Brevet Officer Cadet)
- 17 December 1908 Fähnrich (Officer Cadet)
- 19 August 1909 Leutnant (2nd Lieutenant)
- 24 July 1915 Oberleutnant (1st Lieutenant)
- 15 July 1918 Hauptmann (Captain)
  - 1 July 1922 received Reichswehr Rank Seniority (RDA) from 15 July 1918 (17)
- 1 February 1930 Major with RDA from 1 December 1928 (1a)
- 1 April 1933 Oberstleutnant (Lieutenant Colonel)
- 1 April 1935 Oberst (Colonel)
- 1 February 1938 Generalmajor (Major General) with RDA from 1 June 1938 (7)
- 1 July 1940 Generalleutnant (Lieutenant General)
- 1 December 1941 General der Infanterie (General of the Infantry)
- 12 April 1945 Loss of rank
- 17 April 1945 Major (after reinstatement)

== Awards and decorations ==
- Iron Cross (1914), 2nd and 1st Class
- Friedrich August Cross, 2nd and 1st Class (OFA1/OK1)
- Military Merit Order (Bavaria), 4th Class with Swords (BMV4X/BM4X)
- War Merit Cross (Brunswick), 2nd and 1st Class (BrKr1/BrK1)
- Military Merit Cross (Austria-Hungary), 3rd Class with War Decoration (ÖM3K)
- Hanseatic Cross of Hamburg (HH)
- Gallipoli Star (TH)
- Order of Military Merit (Bulgaria), Knight's Cross (BO5)
- Wound Badge (1918) in Mattweiß (Silver)
- Knight of Honour of the Order of Saint John (Bailiwick of Brandenburg)
- Honour Cross of the World War 1914/1918 with Swords
- Wehrmacht Long Service Award, 4th to 1st Class on 2 October 1936
- Hungarian World War Commemorative Medal with Swords and Helmet
- Order of the Yugoslav Crown, Commander's Cross
- War Merit Cross (1939), 2nd and 1st Class with Swords on 20 April 1941
- Repetition Clasp 1939 to the Iron Cross 1914, 2nd and 1st Class
- German Cross in Gold on 12 February 1944
- Knight's Cross of War Merit Cross with Swords on 21 December 1944

Military offices
| Preceded by Erich Lüdke | Wehrmachtbefehlshaber of Denmark; 29 September 1942 – 27 January 1945 | Succeeded by Georg Lindemann |
