= Granville raid =

German raid on Granville, France, March 1945

- Part of World War II
| Date | 8–9 March 1945 |
| Location | Granville, Manche, France 48°50′15″N 1°35′38″W |
| Result | German victory |

Belligerents
| United States; United Kingdom; France | Germany |

Commanders and leaders
| (United States) Percy Sandel; (United Kingdom) Roger Lightoller † | (Nazi Germany) Friedrich Hüffmeier; (Nazi Germany) Carl-Friedrich Mohr |

Strength
| Unknown | 6 minesweepers; 3 armed barges; 3 motor launches; 1 tug |

Casualties and losses
| 1 minesweeper heavily damaged; 4 freighters damaged; 1 collier captured; 22 killed; 30 captured | 1 minesweeper scuttled; 1 missing; 6 wounded |

The Granville raid occurred on the night of 8–9 March 1945 when a German raiding force from the Channel Islands landed in France and brought back supplies, Allied prisoners and former German prisoners of war to their base.

== History ==
=== Background ===
During the Second World War, Granville, Manche, France was the site of a prisoner of war camp. In December 1944, four German paratroopers and a naval cadet escaped from the camp and captured a US Navy LCVP, in which they made their way to the German occupied Channel Islands. There they relayed substantial intelligence on the Allies' disposition in the Granville area, including the fact that several ships were in the harbour discharging coal, which was in short supply in the Channel Islands, and the location of US troops. (The former POWs were killed on 25 December, while returning to Germany in a transport plane that was shot down by an Allied night fighter near Bastogne. Also killed in the transport was Korvettenkapitän Fritz Breithaupt, a recipient of the Knight's Cross of the Iron Cross with Oak Leaves and commander of Minensuchflottille 24 [Mine Sweeping Flotilla 24].)

The new garrison commander of the Channel Islands, Vizeadmiral Friedrich Hüffmeier, a former captain of the German battleship Scharnhorst, used the intelligence to plan a raid against the Allies to restore morale to his garrison and obtain needed supplies.

On the night of 6–7 February 1945, a first attempt was aborted, due to a combination of bad weather and the detection of an escorting Schnellboot ("E-boat"), by US Navy submarine chaser USS PC-552.

=== Raid ===
The raid, led by Kapitänleutnant Carl-Friedrich Mohr, was carried out on the night of 8–9 March. Hüffmeier's raiding force comprised four large M class minesweepers (M-412, M-432, M-442, M-459), three armed barges (artillery lighters) carrying 8.8 cm guns, three fast motor launches, two small R type minesweepers, and a seagoing tug.

As the Germans had received intelligence regarding the identification signals needed to enter the harbour, they were initially able to land unopposed. They damaged the harbour locks and started fires on shore. The Germans mined the British-registered merchant freighters Kyle Castle, Nephrite, Parkwood and the Norwegian freighter Heien. The master of the Kyle Castle, William Callum Fraser, M.B.E. was killed while resisting the Germans, although an officer named Richard Reed remained hidden on the vessel with a shipmate until after the Germans left.

Outside the port, the submarine chaser USS PC-564 raised the alarm and was attacked by German vessels. About 14 US Navy personnel were killed in action on PC-564, others were wounded, its 3"/50 gun was disabled and the pilot house destroyed. The captain, Lieutenant Percy Sandel, gave the order to abandon ship, but he and other crew members remained on board, and managed to evade the Germans, before intentionally grounding PC-564 on the shore. Sandel and the remaining crew were later rescued. (PC-564 was salvaged and, renamed USS Chadron, remained on the US naval register until 1963.)

At the Hotel des Bains, which housed nine senior US officers, two US Marines resisted the Germans and were killed in action. A Royal Navy officer, Roger Lightoller, the son of Charles Lightoller, and five enlisted personnel from the RN were also killed during the raid. The Germans took 30 Allied personnel as prisoners to the Channel Islands, including 15 of those who had earlier abandoned PC-564.

Allied resistance caused significant delays to the German raiders. By the time they were ready to depart, the tide was so low that only one captured collier, Eskwood, containing 112 tonnes of coal, could be taken back to the Channel Islands. It also carried 67 German former prisoners of war who were working in the area and rescued by the raiding party. A German minesweeper, De Schelde (M-412), ran aground, and was scuttled with explosives.

=== Aftermath ===
While the charges on the British freighters detonated successfully, all of them remained either afloat, aground or accessible at low tide. Reed and others managed to repair the hull damage on Kyle Castle. While her engines were unusable, she had been anchored outside the port and Reed allowed Kyle Castle to drift to a position south of the Channel Islands. Using hatch covers as makeshift sails, they managed to steer Kyle Castle into the English Channel, where they received assistance and were towed to Plymouth.

Mohr was awarded the Knight's Cross of the Iron Cross on 13 March 1945, while Oberleutnant zur See Otto Karl, who had commanded artillery lighter AF 65, was awarded the Knights Cross on 21 March 1945.

In a later operation, an 18-man German sabotage raid from Jersey landed from rubber boats on Cape de la Hague on 5 April 1945, intending to destroy installations. The mission failed, and the team was captured.

A further raid was planned for 7 May 1945, but Admiral Karl Dönitz ordered Hüffmeier not to carry out any more offensive operations so close to the end of the war.

One of the mentioned casualties, Lieutenant Roger Lightoller, was a Motor Torpedo Boat skipper and son of Charles Lightoller, the second officer of the RMS Titanic during its ill-fated maiden voyage.
