= USS Borum =

Buckley-class destroyer escort

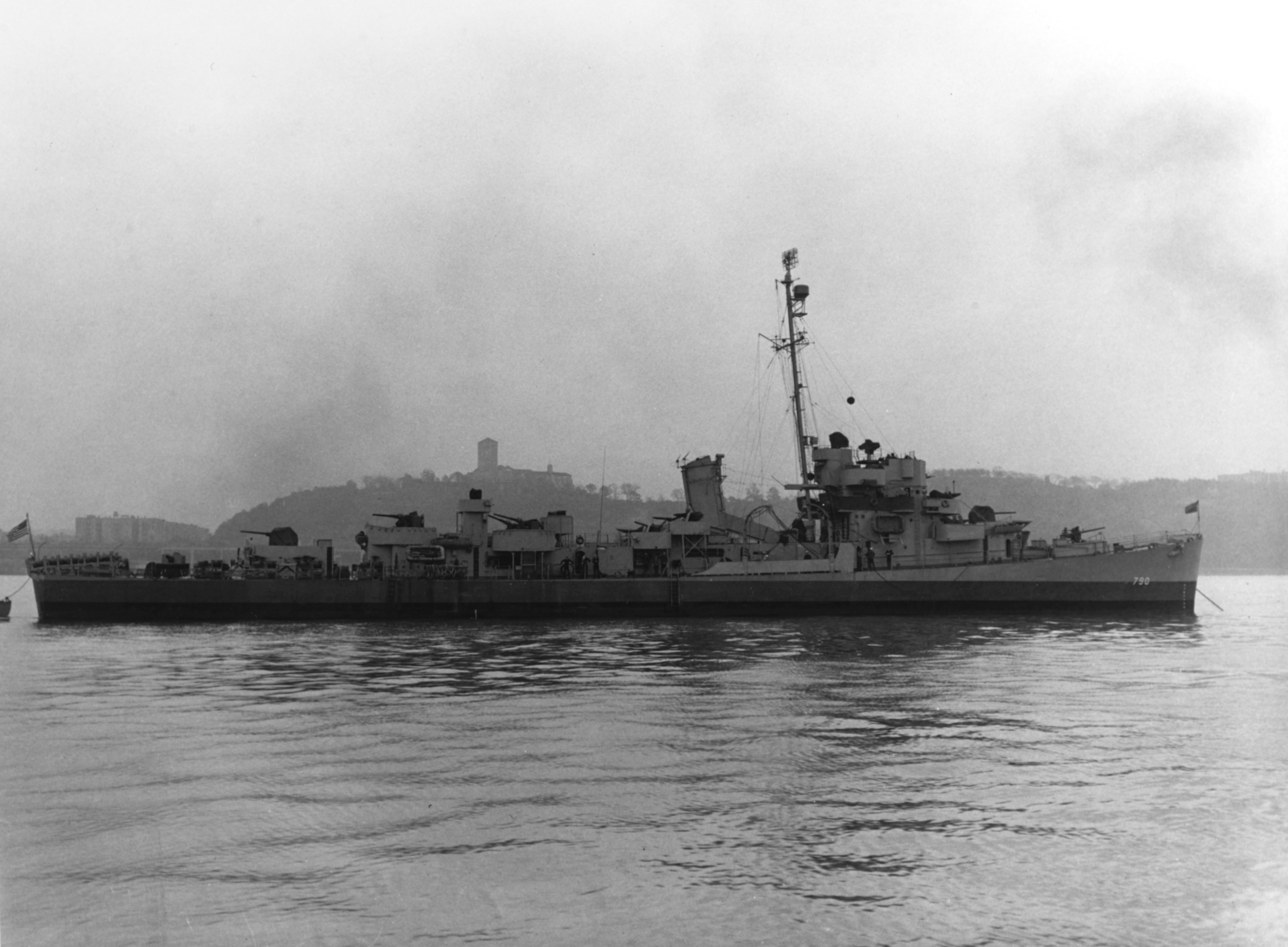
- USS Borum anchored off New York City on 26 October 1945

History

United States
- Name: Borum
- Builder: Consolidated Steel Corporation, Orange, Texas
- Laid down: 28 April 1943
- Launched: 14 August 1943
- Commissioned: 30 November 1943
- Decommissioned: 15 June 1946
- Stricken: 1 August 1965
- Fate: Sold for scrap, 1966

General characteristics
- Displacement: 1,740 long tons (1,770 t) (full); 1,400 long tons (1,400 t), (standard)
- Length: 306 ft (93 m)
- Beam: 36 ft 9 in (11.20 m)
- Draft: 13 ft 6 in (4.11 m)
- Propulsion: GE turbo-electric drive, 12,000 shp (8,900 kW); two propellers
- Speed: 23 knots (43 km/h; 26 mph)
- Range: 4,940 nmi (9,150 km; 5,680 mi) at 12 knots (22 km/h; 14 mph)
- Complement: 15 officers, 198 enlisted
- Armament: 3 × 3 in (76 mm) DP guns, 3 × 21 in (533 mm) torpedo tubes, 1 × 1.1 in (28 mm) quad AA gun, 8 × 20 mm cannon, 1 × hedgehog projector, 2 × depth charge tracks, 8 × K-gun depth charge projectors

USS Borum (DE-790) was a Buckley-class destroyer escort of the United States Navy, in service from 1943 to 1946. She was finally sold for scrap in 1966.

== Namesake ==
John Randolph Borum was born on 8 December 1907 in Norfolk, Virginia. He earned a Bachelor of Science degree in Administrative Engineering at Tri-State College. He enlisted in the United States Army as a Flying Cadet at Langley Field, Virginia, on 31 August 1933, and received an honorable discharge at Randolph Field, Texas, on 9 May 1934. Accepting an appointment as Lieutenant (junior grade), D-V(S), Naval Reserve, on 11 April 1942 (to rank from 10 March), he reported to the Naval Training School (Local Defense), Boston, Massachusetts, on 16 April for instruction. Detached on 15 May, he was transferred to the Armed Guard School located at the Section Base, Little Creek, Virginia, where he reported for duty three days later. Following that period of training, Borum, detached on 4 June, traveled to Chester, Pennsylvania and the Sun Shipbuilding & Drydock Co. yard to assume his duty as officer in charge of the Armed Guard assigned to the Socony-Vacuum Oil tanker Brilliant.

After participating in several convoys along the eastern seaboard and across the Atlantic, on 9 November 1942 Brilliant sailed from New York, bound for Belfast, with 112,000 barrels of oil as cargo, as part of convoy SC 109. On 18 November as the convoy steamed off the Grand Banks of Newfoundland, German submarine U-43 torpedoed the tanker. Flames immediately broke out and caused the three senior officers to believe the ship to be doomed. As those officers began to abandon ship, about to be joined by Brilliant's junior third officer, James C. Cameron, Borum, on his way to his battle station aft, suggested that the general alarm be turned off. Calling the engine room they were assured that all was well below, and the Lux fire-fighting system was turned on, smothering the flames that had, at one point, been licking the foretopmast. Eventually, hand extinguishers and water, in addition to the steam system, quelled the blaze that had imperiled the ship. With undamaged engines, Brilliant got underway. Borum and Cameron brought Brilliant into Musgraveton harbor on 20 November 1942 after a slow passage in heavy weather. Escorted into St. John's the following afternoon, and provided with an officer to navigate the ship Brilliant reached its destination on Sunday, 22 November, with 58,000 barrels of her cargo still intact. Eventually, after repairs at St. John's, Brilliant was taken in tow for Halifax.

On 20 January 1943, during a gale, Brilliant broke in half and sank, taking with her ten men, including Cameron and Borum, who was later awarded (posthumously) a letter of commendation from the Chief of Naval Personnel for his heroic work in helping to save Brilliant after being torpedoed.

== History ==
Borum was launched on 14 August 1943 by the Consolidated Steel Corporation, Orange, Texas; sponsored by Mrs. W. H. Ferguson, wife of Commander Ferguson; and commissioned on 30 November 1943.

Borum spent her entire World War II service in the U.S. Atlantic Fleet. Until March 1944 she served as an escort vessel along the east coast and in the Caribbean, as well as a training vessel in the Chesapeake Bay. She departed New York 8 March 1944 for the British Isles to train for the coming invasion of Europe and to escort convoys between British ports. From 6 to 22 June 1944 she screened the convoys carrying troops and supplies from Britain to the Normandy beachhead.

For most of the next year Borum helped blockade the Channel Islands and protect the shipping headed for Cherbourg and Le Havre, France. She assisted British forces in their occupation of the Channel Islands (11–12 May 1945). Borum departed Europe in June 1945 and, after a short period as a training vessel in the Chesapeake Bay during July, she prepared to join the U.S. Pacific Fleet as a high-speed transport (APD-82).

Following the Japanese surrender her orders were canceled and she reverted to training duty with submarines operating out of New London, Connecticut, and then acted as plane guard for the escort carriers Croatan and Solomons. In January 1946 she joined Escort Division 4, but on 28 March began inactivation at Charleston Naval Shipyard. She arrived at Green Cove Springs, Florida, on 29 April and was placed out of commission 15 June 1946.

Borum received one battle star for her participation in the invasion of Normandy.
