= USS Sentinel =

USS Sentinel may refer to the following ships of the United States Navy:

- USS Sentinel (SP-180), a motorboat built in 1917 by Pacific Shipyards and Ways Co., Alameda, California; renamed Tulare
- USS Sentinel (MB), a motorboat built in 1918 by Richardson Boat Co., North Tonawanda, New York, for the U.S. Coast Guard
- USS Sentinel (AM-113), an oceangoing minesweeper built in 1941
- USS Sentinel (AM-412), scheduled to be built as part of Lend-Lease, but the contract was canceled in 1945
- USS Sentinel (AMCU-39), new name for USS LCI(L)-1052, built in 1944
