= Broadbill =

Broadbill may refer to the bird families:

- the Eurylaimidae, a family of birds known as the Asian and Grauer’s broadbills
- the Calyptomenidae, a family of birds known as the African and green broadbills

Broadbill may also refer to:

- Broadbills, an alternate common name for monarch flycatchers in the genus Myiagra
- An alternate name for the lesser scaup, a North American duck
- An alternate name for the swordfish
- USS Broadbill, the name of two United States Navy ships
