= USS Namontack =

Tugboat of the United States Navy

History

United States
- Name: USS Namontack
- Builder: Defoe Shipbuilding Company, Bay City, Michigan
- Laid down: 1938, as Thomas E. Moran
- Acquired: by purchase, 28 November 1940
- Commissioned: 18 March 1941, as Namontack (YN-46)
- Decommissioned: 21 August 1946
- Reclassified: YNT-14, 1 May 1942; YTB-738, 2 August 1945
- Stricken: 30 December 1946
- Homeport: Little Creek, Virginia
- Fate: Sold, 30 April 1947

General characteristics
- Type: Net tender
- Displacement: 158 long tons (161 t)
- Length: 94 ft 5 in (28.78 m)
- Beam: 25 ft (7.6 m)
- Draft: 8 ft 6 in (2.59 m)

USS Namontack (YN-46/YNT-14/YTB-738) was built in 1938 as the Thomas E. Moran by the Defoe Shipbuilding Company, Bay City, Michigan, for the Moran Towing and Transportation Company, New York City. The name "Namontack" comes from a Native American sent, in 1608, by Chief Powhatan to live with English settlers in Tidewater, Virginia, and gain knowledge of their customs and language. Christopher Newport took him to England on 10 April 1608 to meet the Virginia Company's investors. Namontack remained there for three months and returned to Virginia.

== Construction and design ==
She was built by DeFoe Shipbuilding Company in Bay City, Michigan as the Thomas E. Moran. She was purchased by the United States Navy on 28 November 1940; renamed the Namontack and classified YN-46; converted to a net tender at the New York Navy Yard; and placed in service on 18 March 1941. She was 94 feet 5 inches (28.78 m) long, 25 feet (7.6 m) wide, had a draught of 8 feet 6 inches (2.59 m), and displaced 158 long tons (161 t).

== Service history ==
She departed New York on 26 March 1941, and on arrival at Norfolk, Virginia, on 28 March, reported for duty to the Commandant 5th Naval District. Based at Little Creek, Virginia, for the duration of the war, she performed tug and net and boom tending services there until 1946, except for the period May to July 1942, when she served on Inshore Patrol duty. During this period, she was reclassified as YNT-14 on 1 May 1942, and was again reclassified to YTB-738 on 2 August 1945. She was placed out of service on 21 August 1946 and was struck from the Navy Directory on 30 December 1946. She was sold on 30 April 1947.
