= USS Weiss (APD-135) =

Warfare vessel of the United States

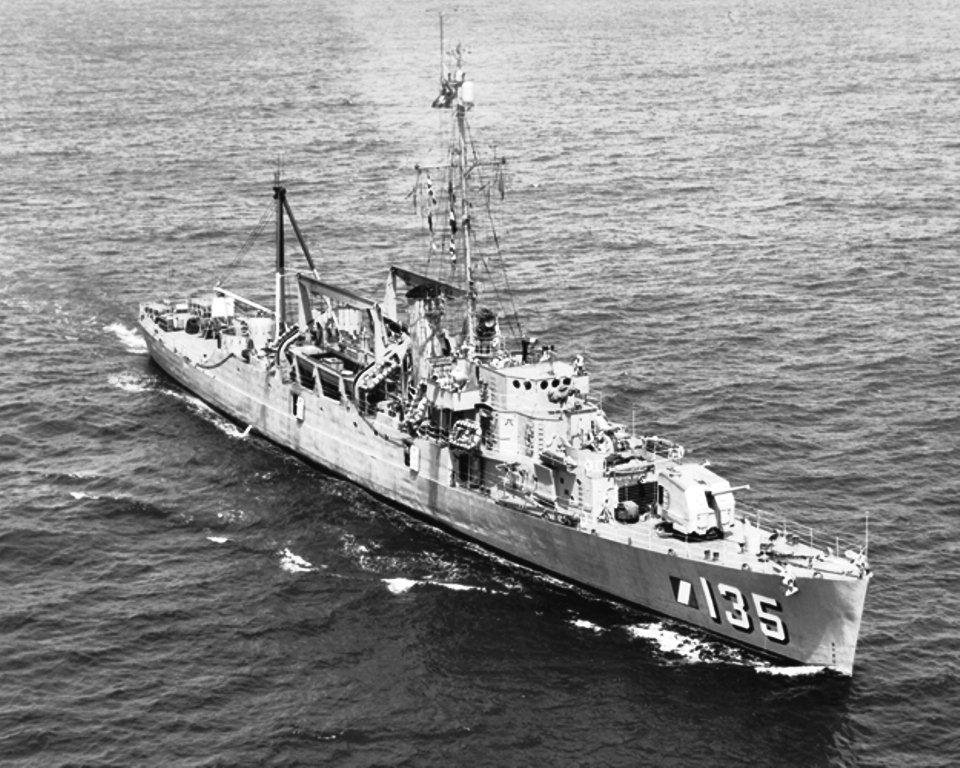

History

United States
- Name: USS Weiss
- Namesake: Carl W. Weiss
- Ordered: 1942
- Builder: Defoe Shipbuilding Company, Bay City, Michigan
- Laid down: 14 October 1944
- Launched: 17 February 1945
- Commissioned: 7 July 1945
- Decommissioned: 2 May 1949
- Recommissioned: 14 October 1950
- Decommissioned: 2 March 1958
- Recommissioned: 20 November 1961
- Decommissioned: January 1970
- Reclassified: LPR-135, 1 January 1969
- Stricken: 15 September 1974
- Honors and awards: 3 battle stars (Korea); 7 battle stars (Vietnam)
- Fate: Sold for scrap, 24 June 1976

General characteristics
- Class & type: Crosley-class high speed transport
- Displacement: 1,450 long tons (1,473 t)
- Length: 306 ft (93 m)
- Beam: 36 ft 10 in (11.23 m)
- Draft: 13 ft 6 in (4.11 m)
- Propulsion: 2 × Combustion Engineering DR boilers; Turbo-electric drive with 2 × General Electric steam turbines; 2 × solid manganese-bronze 3600 lb. 3-bladed propellers, 8 ft 6 in (2.59 m), 7 ft 7 in (2.31 m) pitch; 12,000 hp (8.9 MW); 2 rudders; 359 tons fuel oil
- Speed: 23 knots (43 km/h; 26 mph)
- Range: 3,700 nmi (6,900 km) at 15 kn (28 km/h; 17 mph); 6,000 nmi (11,000 km) at 12 kn (22 km/h; 14 mph)
- Boats & landing craft carried: 4 × LCVPs
- Troops: 162 troops
- Complement: 204 (12 officers, 192 enlisted)
- Armament: 1 × 5"/38 caliber gun; 3 × twin 40 mm guns; 6 × single 20 mm guns; 2 × depth charge tracks

The USS Weiss (APD-135/LPR-135) was a Crosley-class high speed transport in service with the United States Navy from 1945 to 1970, with two short periods spent in reserve. She was finally scrapped in 1976.

== Namesake ==
Carl Weiss was born in Detroit, Michigan on 27 March 1915. He enlisted in the United States Marine Corps on 18 December 1939. After completing basic training at Parris Island, South Carolina, he served successively at Quantico, Virginia; and at Philadelphia, Pennsylvania; during the early part of 1940.

On 1 March 1940, he reported to Fort Mifflin for duty which lasted for over a year. He returned to the base at Quantico briefly in June 1941 before going to sea in the transport USS McCawley at the end of the first week in July for a month's assignment. Promoted to Corporal while in that transport, Weiss returned ashore at Portsmouth, Virginia, on 14 August 1941, and from there, moved on to duty at New River, North Carolina, in September. Weiss was promoted to Sergeant in March 1942, and by the following summer, had been assigned to the Pacific theater in preparation for the Solomon Islands operation.

While serving with C Company, 1st Battalion, 5th Marines, 1st Marine Division, during a battle on 1 November 1942 with Japanese forces near Matanikau River, Guadalcanal, Weiss charged an enemy machine gun position and destroyed it with a hand grenade. Returning to his own machine gun, Weiss directed his gunners in repulsing three bayonet charges. When one of his men received a wound and fell forward of the emplacement, Weiss "crawled forward and dragged his comrade to safety". The next day, he again inched forward over the crest of the hill toward another enemy machine gun. Though the position opened fire on him, he continued forward and lobbed a grenade at the offending weapon. He then attempted to toss another grenade to finish the job begun by the first but was felled, mortally wounded by enemy fire. For "his great personal valor, aggressiveness and fine spirit of self sacrifice," Weiss was posthumously awarded the Navy Cross.

In 1944, USS Weiss, a John C. Butler-class destroyer escort, was named in his honor. This ship was cancelled on 5 June 1944 before completion, and her materials were scrapped.

== History ==
Originally designated DE-719, a Rudderow-class destroyer escort, Weiss was re-designated as APD-135, a fast transport, on 17 July 1944, even before being laid down on 4 October 1944 at the Defoe Shipbuilding Company, in Bay City, Michigan. She was launched on 17 February 1945; sponsored by Mrs. Anna Weiss. Builders trials before her pre-commissioning cruise were done in Lake Huron.

After completion, Weiss sailed from the builder's yard at Bay City to Chicago, Illinois. From there, they went through the Chicago Sanitary and Ship Canal and down the Chicago River to Joliet, Illinois, where pontoons were attached to the ship so it could be pushed down the Des Plaines River, Illinois River, and Mississippi River as part of a barge train. After arriving at the Todd Johnson Shipyard in Algiers, Louisiana, on the west bank of the Mississippi at New Orleans, the rest of the crew reported aboard, and Weiss was commissioned at New Orleans, on 7 July 1945.

=== 1945–1949 ===
The warship departed New Orleans on 20 July to conduct shakedown training in the vicinity of Guantanamo Bay, Cuba. She was still engaged in those operations on 14 August when she received word of the end of hostilities in World War II. Thereafter, she continued her shakedown training but with a lesser sense of urgency.

Following a post-shakedown overhaul at Norfolk, Virginia, she sailed on 4 September for Melville, Rhode Island, where for the next two months she served as a training ship. On 29 October, the high-speed transport returned to Norfolk, where she remained until mid-January 1946. On 14 January, she began a ten-week cruise to the West Indies, returning to the United States at Morehead City, North Carolina, on the last day of March. In April, she visited Washington, D.C., and underwent repairs, first at Charleston, South Carolina in early May and later at the New York Naval Shipyard in June.

In August, the high-speed transport served as an escort for the Presidential Yacht Williamsburg (AGC-369) when Harry S. Truman voyaged in her to Bermuda for a vacation. Williamsburg returned the President to Washington on 2 September, and Weiss resumed east coast duty. Based at Norfolk, she spent the next 19 months operating from that port. On 2 May 1949, the warship was decommissioned at Charleston and then towed to Green Cove Springs, Florida, to be berthed with the Atlantic Reserve Fleet.

=== Korean War, 1950–1953 ===
On 25 June 1950, communist North Korea launched an invasion of South Korea. The United Nations Security Council taking advantage of the Soviet boycott decided to provide military assistance to South Korea against the aggressor. The United States took on the majority of the responsibility for carrying out the Security Council's operations, particularly with regard to naval forces. That required the reactivation of many ships in the Reserve Fleet. Weiss was moved out of her berth at Green Cove Springs, quickly readied for action, and recommissioned on 14 October 1950.

Following shakedown training out of Guantanamo Bay, Cuba, Weiss set sail for the Pacific on 15 March 1951. She stopped at San Diego, California, for two weeks of maintenance and upkeep, and then continued her voyage west, arriving in Korean waters on 3 May.

The high-speed transport spent the bulk of her first Korean War tour in bombardment and Underwater Demolition Team (UDT) missions. She also conducted training and exercises with the UDT men as well as with other units of the 7th Fleet. She concluded her assignment in the Far East on 17 October when she set a course to return to the United States.

Following a period of upkeep and training on the west coast during the winter of 1951 and 1952, Weiss headed back to the Far East in the summer, and arrived in Korean waters on 2 July. Once again, bombardment missions and UDT support duty occupied the majority of her time. She also participated in "Operation Fishnet", a strategic initiative intended to drive the North Koreans into submission by depriving them of their fish catch. The high-speed transport completed her second tour of Korean War service on 1 April 1953, and arrived in San Diego on 2 July.

=== 1953–1958 ===
Less than a month after Weiss returned to the United States, the armistice of 27 July 1953 effectively ended hostilities on the Korean peninsula. Consequently, the high-speed transport settled into a peacetime routine of deployments to the western Pacific alternated with upkeep and training periods along the west coast of the United States. Between July 1953 and December 1957, she made three deployments to the Far East. The Weiss took part in "Operation Flaghoist", a huge amphibious training exercise at Iwo Jima on 23 February 1954, the 9th anniversary of the flag raising on Mount Suribachi. Port visits, training missions, and providing evidence of American military presence in Asian waters proved to be her major responsibilities during these initial post-Korean War tours with the 7th Fleet.

On 2 March 1958, Weiss was placed out of commission once again. She was berthed with the Pacific Reserve Fleet at Treasure Island, California, for the next four years. On 20 November 1961, Weiss was placed back in commission at San Diego.

=== 1961–1964 ===
The warship conducted shakedown and amphibious training during the winter of 1961 and 1962, and then settled into a normal west coast routine, operating out of San Diego. That duty lasted until 16 October 1962, at which time she departed San Diego on her first tour of duty in the western Pacific following her recommissioning. During that deployment she operated from the base at Subic Bay in the Philippines, and engaged in training missions with UDT men. Early in the assignment, the ship visited Sattahip, Thailand, with UDT men embarked. There, she participated in bilateral UDT exercises with members of the Royal Thai Navy. The high-speed transport returned to Subic Bay on 17 December, and remained there through the beginning of the new year. During the latter stages of her western Pacific tour, in February and March 1963, the warship earned the Armed Forces Expeditionary Medal for a tour of duty in Vietnamese waters. Sent an LCVP up rivers to various Vietnam Navy Bases with UDT personnel and landed ReCon marines on Vietnam beached. Lost an LCVP due to broaching on Vietnam beaches.

She returned to the United States later that spring, and resumed normal operations until commencing a Fleet Rehabilitation and Modernization (FRAM) overhaul late in the year. She completed her FRAM II conversion early in 1964, and resumed local operations out of San Diego. On 18 June 1964, she stood out of San Diego for another tour of duty in the western Pacific. En route, the warship stopped at Oahu for about a month of operations out of Pearl Harbor, and then continued on to Okinawa.

During the night of 26–27 July, Typhoon Flossie struck her anchorage at Okinawa, parted her anchor chain, and drove the high-speed transport into uncharted waters. Efforts to maneuver back into known waters failed; and, at 20:42, Weiss ran aground. On the 27th, the tug Tawasa (ATF-92), while attempting to refloat Weiss, also grounded on an uncharted reef. Safeguard (ARS-25) then came to the aid of both stricken ships. Finally at about 20:00 hours, Weiss eased off the reef into deeper water. Tawasa was refloated early on the 28th and departed Okinawa that same day, bound for Sasebo with Weiss in tow. The high-speed transport completed repairs by late August, and joined a contingency force sent to Vietnamese waters as a result of the Gulf of Tonkin Incident earlier that month. She remained there from 25 August to 28 September. After spending most of October in the Philippines, Weiss returned to Vietnamese waters briefly in November. On 28 November, she departed Subic Bay to return to San Diego, where she arrived on 18 December.

=== Vietnam War, 1965–1969 ===
Following the usual holiday leave and an upkeep period, Weiss commenced operations along the coast of southern California. Those missions consisted of exercises in cooperation with Marine Corps reconnaissance units and Navy Underwater Demolition Teams. Such duty occupied her time until mid-summer 1965, when she entered the Long Beach Naval Shipyard for a two-month availability. She completed repairs on 30 August and returned to San Diego for refresher training. On 18 October, Weiss left San Diego for another tour of duty in the Far East with the 7th Fleet. She made an overnight stop at Pearl Harbor on 26–27 October, and arrived in Subic Bay on 12 November. On the 23rd, she departed the Philippines for her first tour of combat duty off the coast of South Vietnam.

Her first actual combat mission came on 30 November and 1 December when she landed marines near Lang Ke Ga, South Vietnam, as part of Operation Dagger Thrust IV. Her second such mission occurred on the 5th and 6th when her embarked marines made a search-and-destroy landing near Phu Tu as a part of Operation Dagger Thrust V. On the evening of the 6th, she reembarked the troops and retired toward Subic Bay for a rest and relaxation period. However, on the 8th, she was recalled to assist in a salvage operation near Phu Tu. She completed her part in that mission on the 9th, and resumed her voyage to Subic Bay where she arrived on 13 December.

In January 1966, Weiss did two tours of duty in Vietnamese waters conducting surveys of the coast and river mouths. She returned to the Philippines from the second Vietnam tour of the year on 1 February, and embarked American UDT men and a Philippine underwater operations unit to participate in bilateral reconnaissance exercises near Legaspi, Luzon, between 3 and 9 February. A visit to Hong Kong, availability at Subic Bay, and another survey tour off Vietnam followed in late February and early March. Her last combat operation of the deployment began on 20 March when she came under the operational control of the amphibious ready group for Operation Jackstay, a combined surface and helicopter-borne amphibious assault on Viet Cong guerrillas in the Rung Sat Special Zone. The operation began on 26 March and continued through 6 April, at which time Weiss headed back to Subic Bay for upkeep. Later that month, she departed the Philippines and headed home. She made a stop at Pearl Harbor along the way and arrived in San Diego on 14 May.

The ship remained in port for the next five weeks engaged in the usual post-deployment leave and upkeep. On 28 June, she stood out of San Diego and shaped a course for San Francisco, where she began regular overhaul at the Bethlehem Steel shipyard. She remained there until 9 November when labor problems in the civilian yard forced her to shift to the San Francisco Bay Naval Shipyard to ensure timely completion of the overhaul. Repairs completed, the warship exited the yard on 9 December, and headed back to San Diego, whence she operated until late February 1967.

On 24 February, she departed San Diego for the western Pacific. After stops at Pearl Harbor and at Guam, the ship entered Subic Bay on 20 March. Weiss operated in the Philippines for almost two months conducting surveys and reconnaissance training. In mid-May, she made a liberty call at Hong Kong and then returned to Subic Bay late in the month. On the 28th, she departed the Philippines with a detachment of UDT-11 embarked, and set a course for South Vietnam, arriving at Vũng Tàu on 31 May. Following briefings there and at An Thoi, Weiss began a series of coastal surveys to determine suitable landing beaches and canal entrances for amphibious operations. That duty lasted until 10 June, at which time she headed back to Subic Bay. She remained in the Philippines from 10 to 21 June, and then once more got underway for Vietnam. She conducted another series of coastal surveys until 3 July, and returned to Subic Bay for a week's rest and relaxation. The ship arrived back in Vũng Tàu on 15 July and began her final series of surveys, completing them on the 31st. Following that, she made stops at Bangkok, Subic Bay, and Yokosuka before heading back to the United States on 26 August. She stopped at Pearl Harbor along the way and arrived in San Diego on 16 September. Post-deployment standdown and an interim availability at a civilian yard occupied the remainder of 1967.

Weiss completed her availability and post-deployment standdown early in 1968, and began normal west coast operations out of San Diego. That employment lasted until 1 August, at which time she headed back to the western Pacific. The ship stopped at Pearl Harbor from 9 to 11 August, and then continued her voyage to Yokosuka, Japan, where she arrived on the 23rd. A week later, the ship sailed for Subic Bay, where she remained from 3 to 9 September. From Subic Bay, she moved on to the coast of Vietnam to resume coast survey missions in support of 7th Fleet amphibious operations. She returned to Subic Bay on 24 September and stayed over until 2 October. Back off the coast of South Vietnam early in October, Weiss provided over-the-horizon support for Navy SEAL teams participating in Operation Bold Dragon VII and VIII carried out in the IV Corps tactical zone. During these operations, the warship fired her guns in anger for the first time since the Korean War. She returned to Subic Bay on 11 November and remained until the 20th when she got underway for Hong Kong and a liberty call. Back in Vietnamese waters early in December, she again provided support for Navy SEAL teams engaged in Operation Bold Dragon IX. That mission carried her into 1969.

Weiss was redesignated an Amphibious Transport, Small, LPR-135, on 1 January 1969. She departed the Far East early in the spring of 1969 and returned to San Diego. For the remainder of the year, she conducted normal west coast operations out of San Diego and began preparations for decommissioning.

=== Decommissioning and fate ===
Weiss was placed out of commission in January 1970, and was berthed with the Atlantic Reserve Fleet at Orange, Texas. On 15 September 1974, her name was struck from the Navy List. Weiss was sold to J.R. Steel, Inc., on 24 June 1976 for scrapping.

== Awards ==
Weiss earned three battle stars during the Korean War and seven battle stars for service in Vietnamese waters.
