= USS Holt =

Rudderow-class destroyer escort

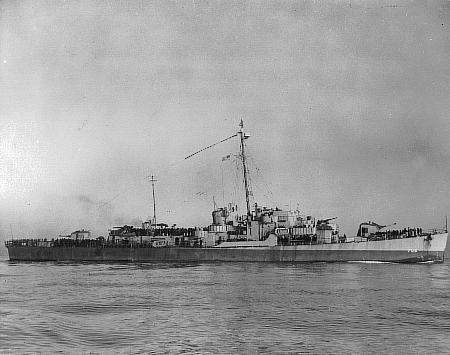
- Holt arriving in San Francisco, January 1946

History

United States
- Name: USS Holt
- Namesake: William Mack Holt
- Ordered: 1942
- Builder: Defoe Shipbuilding Company, Bay City, Michigan
- Laid down: 28 November 1943
- Launched: 15 February 1944
- Commissioned: 9 June 1944
- Decommissioned: 2 July 1946
- Stricken: 15 November 1974
- Honors and awards: 2 battle stars (World War II)
- Fate: Loaned to South Korea, 19 June 1963; Purchased outright, 15 November 1974

South Korea
- Name: ROKS Chung Nam (DE-73)
- Acquired: 19 June 1963
- Reclassified: DE-821, 1980
- Stricken: 31 January 1984
- Fate: Scrapped, 1984

General characteristics
- Class & type: Rudderow-class destroyer escort
- Displacement: 1,450 long tons (1,473 t) light; 1,673 long tons (1,700 t) standard
- Length: 306 ft (93 m)
- Beam: 37 ft (11 m)
- Draft: 13 ft 9 in (4.19 m) full
- Propulsion: Turbo-electric drive, 12,000 hp (8.9 MW)
- Speed: 24 knots (44 km/h; 28 mph)
- Complement: 186
- Armament: 2 × 5"/38 caliber guns; 2 × twin 40 mm guns; 10 × single 20 mm guns; 1 × triple 21 inch (533 mm) torpedo tubes; 1 × Hedgehog anti-submarine mortar; 8 × K-gun depth charge projectors; 2 × depth charge tracks

USS Holt (DE-706) was a Rudderow-class destroyer escort of the United States Navy. She was named after William Mack Holt.

== Namesake ==
William Mack Holt was born on 9 September 1917 in Great Falls, Montana. He enlisted in the Navy on 4 October 1940, and was appointed an Aviation Cadet on 26 December 1940. After completing flight training, he reported to the aircraft carrier USS Enterprise as a fighter pilot on 16 December 1941. Later transferred to the carrier air wing aboard USS Saratoga (VF-3), Holt participated in the air operations over Guadalcanal.

On 7 August 1942, after sighting a group of about 27 Japanese bombers with escorts, Lieutenant (j.g.) Holt led his two-plane section through the enemy fighters, downing several, and helped to turn back the bombers, continuing his attacks until his own aircraft was shot down. Holt was posthumously awarded the Navy Cross.

== Construction and commissioning ==
Holt's keel was laid down on 28 November 1943 at the Defoe Shipbuilding Company of Bay City, Michigan, as one of a series of Buckley-class destroyer escorts ordered from Defoe. After completing 13 ships, Defoe received a contract modification to complete the rest with 5-inch guns, which became known as the Rudderow class. Launched on 15 February 1944, she was sponsored by Mrs. Robert Holt, mother of Lt.(jg) Holt. She was commissioned at New Orleans, Louisiana on 9 June 1944, with Lieutenant Commander Victor Blue commanding.

== Service history ==
=== World War II, 1944–1946 ===
Holt conducted her shakedown cruise off Bermuda, and after a short stay in Boston, Massachusetts, reported to Norfolk, Virginia, on 8 August 1944. Until 19 August, she helped carry out shallow water tests in the Patuxent River, Maryland, and then joined Escort Division 74 at Norfolk. Holt screened the escort carriers Wake Island (CVE-65) and Mission Bay (CVE-59) from Norfolk to Newport, Rhode Island, and departed on 5 September 1944 on anti-submarine operations along the Eastern seaboard. She came upon the torpedoed SS George Ade on 12 September, and joined in the search for the U-boat which had attacked her. The search had to be called off, however, as a hurricane approached the next day. Holt returned to Norfolk, and after escorting coastal convoys to Boston and New York, she sailed from Norfolk for the Pacific.

The escort and her division transited the Panama Canal on 23 October, and arrived at Hollandia, New Guinea via the Galapagos and Society Islands on 21 November. The ship then became a unit of the 7th Fleet, and departed on 28 November to join carrier forces in Leyte Gulf providing protection for the vital military operations ashore. She completed this duty on 11 December, and steamed with a convoy toward Mindoro for the establishment of a motor torpedo boat base on that island. During this invasion, an important step in the retaking of the Philippines, Holt's gunfire protected her supply convoy and shot down several planes attempting to attack the invasion forces during the landings on 15 December. The destroyer escort returned to Leyte with a convoy on 17 December, and remained in San Pedro Bay until 22 December 1944.

Holt's next duty was guarding supply ships on the voyage to Hollandia, and after a stop at Manus Island, she got underway once more from Hollandia on 8 January 1945 with the resupply convoy for Lingayen Gulf. Steaming by way of San Pedro Bay, the task group reached Lingayen on 21 January, and Holt began anti-submarine patrol in support of troop movements ashore. She remained in the gulf until 27 January, downing a suicide plane which nearly crashed her on 23 January, and provided protection for the convoys off the beaches.

Departing Lingayen on 27 January, Holt arrived at San Pedro Bay on 1 February, and after escorting another convoy to Lingayen Gulf, she entered the recently liberated Subic Bay on 12 February 1945. Holt served as an escort to and from the harbor entrance until she steamed from Subic Bay on 27 March to aid in one of the final operations for the securing of Luzon. Arriving off Legaspi on 1 April, Holt provided fire support during the landing that day, and then returned to Subic Bay to convoy supporting forces back to Legaspi for the landings on 7–8 April. Possession of this area allowed American forces to control the shores of San Bernardino Strait, thus shortening the supply routes from Leyte Gulf to the assault areas on the western shores of the Philippines.

Returning to San Pedro Bay, Holt next steamed to Morotai to join a convoy in support of the assault on Tarakan Island, Borneo. The first target in the series of Borneo landings, Tarakan was taken by Australian forces under Marine and Navy air support on 1 May, and Holt arrived with supply ships five days later. The ship was forced to remain constantly on the alert for suicide swimmers and limpet mines while in the area, but departed Borneo safely on 9 May for San Pedro Bay.

After repairs in a floating drydock, Holt was assigned to weather patrol, and cruised the eastern South China Sea, sending reports to help guide movements of the vast fleets then operating in the Pacific. On this duty until 18 December 1945, she departed that date with 75 persons on board for San Francisco via the Marshalls and Pearl Harbor, arriving on 9 January 1946.

=== Decommissioning and sale ===
Decommissioned on 2 July 1946, Holt was assigned to San Diego Group, Pacific Reserve Fleet, until December 1962, when she began preparations for transfer to a foreign country. Loaned to the Republic of Korea on 19 June 1963 under the Military Assistance Program, she served as Chung Nam (D-73). Purchased outright by South Korea on 15 November 1974, Chung Nam's hull number was changed to DE-821 in 1980. She was stricken on 31 January 1984.

== Military awards and honors ==
Combat Action Ribbon
American Campaign Medal
Asiatic-Pacific Campaign Medal (with two bronze service stars)
World War II Victory Medal
Philippine Presidential Unit Citation
Philippine Liberation Medal (with one bronze service star)
