= USS Sentinel (AM-412) =

Minesweeper of the United States Navy

History

United States
- Name: Sentinel
- Builder: Defoe Shipbuilding Co., Bay City, Michigan
- Fate: Contract cancelled, 12 August 1945

General characteristics (as designed)
- Displacement: 625 long tons (635 t)
- Length: 184 ft 6 in (56.24 m)
- Beam: 33 ft (10 m)
- Draft: 10 ft (3.0 m)
- Speed: 15 knots (28 km/h; 17 mph)
- Complement: 104 officers and men
- Armament: 1 × 3"/50 caliber gun; 4 × Bofors 40 mm gun; 6 × Oerlikon 20 mm cannon; 1 × Hedgehog anti-submarine mortar; 4 × Depth charge projectors; 2 × Depth charge racks; 2 × Minesweeping paravanes

USS Sentinel (AM-412) was a steel-hulled fleet (oceangoing) minesweeper of the Admirable class planned for the United States Navy. She was a part of a group of minesweepers scheduled to be built as replacements and for Lend-Lease commitments. On 12 August 1945, three days before hostilities ceased in the Pacific, the U.S. Navy cancelled its contract with the Defoe Shipbuilding Co., Bay City, Michigan, for the construction of Sentinel.
