= USS Carlinville =

Patrol vessel of the United States Navy

History

United States
- Name: USS Carlinville (PC-1120)
- Namesake: Carlinville, Illinois
- Builder: Defoe Shipbuilding Company
- Laid down: 19 June 1942
- Launched: 24 August 1942
- Commissioned: 18 January 1943
- Decommissioned: January 1947
- Stricken: 1 April 1959
- Fate: Maritime Commission

General characteristics
- Class & type: PC-461-class submarine chaser
- Displacement: 295 tons (light), 450 tons (full)
- Length: 173 ft 8 in (52.93 m)
- Beam: 23 ft (7.0 m)
- Draft: 10 ft 10 in (3.30 m)
- Propulsion: 2 x 2,880bhp General Motors 16-258S diesel engines
- Speed: 20 knots
- Complement: 65
- Armament: 1 × 3 in (76 mm)/50 cal; 1 × 40 mm gun; 3 × 20 mm cannons; 2 × rocket launchers; 4 × depth charge throwers; 2 × depth charge tracks

USS Carlinville was a United States Navy patrol boat. It was laid down on 19 June 1942 at the Defoe Shipbuilding Company in Bay City, Michigan; launched on 24 August 1942; and commissioned as USS PC-1120 on 18 January 1943.

During World War II, PC-1120 was assigned to the South Pacific area of the Asiatic-Pacific theater, she took part in the Bismarck Archipelago operations-Arawe, New Britain, from 15 December 1943 through 13 January 1944; Eastern New Guinea operations-Saidor occupation, from 2 through 4 June 1944; Western New Guinea operations-Biak Island operation, from 18 through 21 June 1944; Noemfoor Island operation, from 2 through 4 July 1944; Cape Sansapor operation, and the Morotai operations, starting on 15 September 1944.

Following these, she moved north to the Philippines where she took part in the Leyte landings from 15 through 25 October 1944; the consolidation of the Southern Philippines-Palawan Island landings, from 28 February through 3 March 1945; and the Borneo operations and Tarakan Island operations, from 27 April through 5 May 1945

She was decommissioned in January 1947 and placed in the Pacific Reserve Fleet at the Columbia River. While still de-commissioned, she was named Carlinville on 15 February 1956. She was struck from the Navy Directory on 1 April 1959, and she was turned over to the Maritime Commission and eventually sold to an Alaskan fisherman. In 1975, the former subchaser was owned by the Diesel Electric Company of Seattle, Washington, and working as an inter-island personnel and cargo transport in the Hawaiian Islands as the M/V Island Transport.

In 1976 she was seized by the United States Marshals Service in a bankruptcy ruling and sold to Greenpeace for $70,000. With Greenpeace, she was renamed the M/V Ohana Kai (Hawaiian for "Children of the Sea"), and registered in Panama, and used to harass the Russian whaling fleet which was operating south of the Hawaiian Islands. She was later sold to a group that wanted to take it crab fishing, but this venture did not work out. One year, a December storm tore it from its moorings and it ended up on the mud flats off Emeryville.

She was then sold to Clause Von Wendel, who lived aboard her at Berkeley, California. After many years of court orders and lawsuits, the city of Berkeley and the owners of the marina had Von Wendel and his followers evicted. In April 1991, the ex-Carlinville was sold for scrap and towed to a scrap yard in Alameda.
