= USS Kleinsmith =

US Navy transport ship

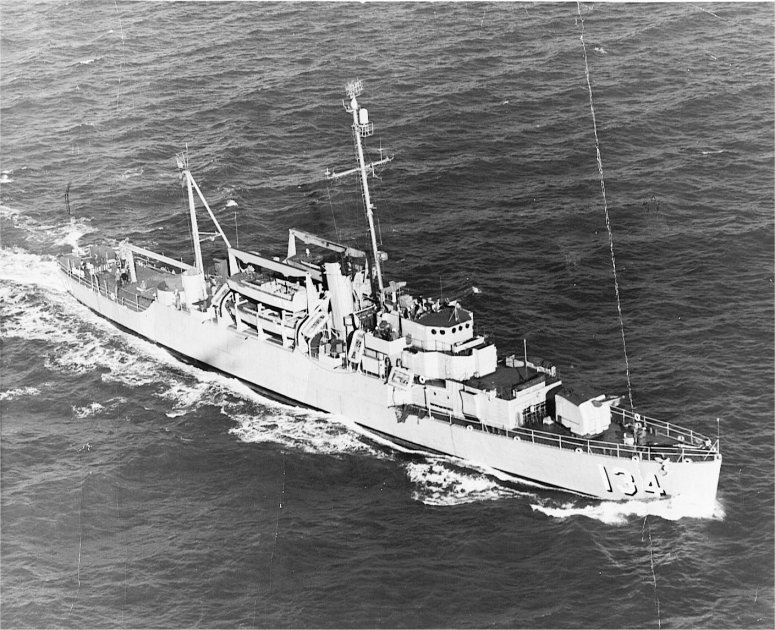
- Kleinsmith underway off Guantanamo Bay, Cuba, ca. 1948-49.

History

United States
- Name: USS Kleinsmith (DE-718)
- Namesake: Charles Kleinsmith
- Ordered: 1942, as Buckley-class destroyer escort
- Builder: Defoe Shipbuilding Company, Bay City, Michigan
- Reclassified: APD-134, 17 July 1944
- Laid down: 8 August 1944
- Launched: 27 January 1945
- Commissioned: 12 June 1945
- Decommissioned: 16 May 1960
- Stricken: 16 May 1960
- Fate: Transferred to the Republic of China, 16 May 1960

History

Taiwan
- Name: ROCS Tien Shan (APD-215)
- Acquired: 16 May 1960
- Reclassified: PF-615
- Decommissioned: 1997 or 1998
- Fate: Scrapped

General characteristics
- Class & type: Crosley-class high speed transport
- Displacement: 1,450 long tons (1,473 t)
- Length: 306 ft (93 m)
- Beam: 36 ft 10 in (11.23 m)
- Draft: 13 ft 6 in (4.11 m)
- Propulsion: 2 × Combustion Engineering DR boilers; Turbo-electric drive with 2 × General Electric steam turbines; 2 × solid manganese-bronze 3600 lb. 3-bladed propellers, 8 ft 6 in (2.59 m), 7 ft 7 in (2.31 m) pitch; 12,000 hp (8.9 MW); 2 rudders; 359 tons fuel oil
- Speed: 23 knots (43 km/h; 26 mph)
- Range: 3,700 nmi (6,900 km) at 15 kn (28 km/h; 17 mph); 6,000 nmi (11,000 km) at 12 kn (22 km/h; 14 mph)
- Boats & landing craft carried: 4 × LCVPs
- Troops: 162 troops
- Complement: 204 (12 officers, 192 enlisted)
- Armament: 1 × 5"/38 caliber gun; 3 × twin 40 mm guns; 6 × single 20 mm guns; 2 × depth charge tracks

USS Kleinsmith (APD-134), ex-DE-718, was a Crosley-class high speed transport for the United States Navy. She was named for Chief Watertender Charles Kleinsmith (1904–1942), who was posthumously awarded the Navy Cross for his heroism during the Battle of Midway.

== Namesake ==
Charles Kleinsmith was born on 28 September 1904 in Zionsville, Pennsylvania. He enlisted in the United States Navy on 26 October 1922 as an apprentice seaman. Until honorably discharged on 5 October 1926 as fireman second class, he served on board several ships, including the battleships USS Wyoming and USS Maryland.

Kleinsmith reenlisted in the Navy on 20 December 1928, and during the next 11 years he had duty on board the light cruisers USS Milwaukee and USS Cincinnati, the heavy cruiser USS Portland and the light cruiser USS Honolulu. He reported aboard the aircraft carrier USS Saratoga on 27 December 1939 and transferred to the aircraft carrier USS Yorktown on 31 October 1940. He achieved the rank of chief watertender.

During the Battle of Midway on 4 June 1942, Chief Watertender Kleinsmith maintained auxiliary power on Yorktown after an intense Imperial Japanese Navy bombing attack extinguished the fires in all of her boilers but one. At the end of the attack, Kleinsmith was missing and presumed dead. He was posthumously awarded the Navy Cross.

== Construction and commissioning ==
Originally a Rudderow-class destroyer escort designated DE-718, Kleinsmith was re-designated as APD-134 on 17 July 1944, even before being laid down on 30 August 1944 at the Defoe Shipbuilding Company, Bay City, Michigan. She was launched on 27 January 1945, sponsored by Mrs. Mary Agnes Kleinsmith. Builders trials before her pre-commissioning cruise were done in Lake Huron.

After completion, Kleinsmith sailed from the builder's yard at Bay City to Chicago, Illinois. From there, they went through the Chicago Sanitary and Ship Canal and down the Chicago River to Joliet, Illinois, where pontoons were attached to the ship so it could be pushed down the Des Plaines River, Illinois River, and Mississippi River as part of a barge train. After arriving at the Todd Johnson Shipyard in Algiers, Louisiana, on the west bank of the Mississippi at New Orleans, the rest of the crew reported aboard, and Kleinsmith was commissioned at New Orleans on 12 June 1945.

== Service history ==
=== 1945–1951 ===
As an APD, her primary role was to land raiding parties on enemy beaches and Underwater Demolition Teams (UDT) personnel on beach obstacle clearance operations. APDs also retained the sound gear and some anti-submarine weapons of destroyer escorts, and served as escorts to amphibious groups. Because they could take on extra personnel, they were often designated as rescue ships if a transport went down.

After shakedown out of Guantanamo Bay, Kleinsmith arrived at Norfolk, Virginia, on 21 July. Departing on 4 August for the Pacific, the high-speed transport steamed via the Panama Canal, San Diego, and Pearl Harbor, and reached Buckner Bay, Okinawa, on 1 October. She operated between Okinawa and the Japanese home islands until 21 February 1946. She then sailed from Sasebo via the Marshall Islands and Pearl Harbor, arriving at San Francisco on 24 March with 118 returning veterans embarked. Departing on 10 April, she proceeded via the Panama Canal to the East Coast, arriving at Norfolk on 1 May 1946.

Based at Norfolk and NAB Little Creek, during the next six years, Kleinsmith operated along the Atlantic coast from Labrador to Venezuela while conducting amphibious and anti-submarine operations. She served primarily as an amphibious command ship; many of her cruises carried her into the Caribbean, where she operated out of Puerto Rico, the Virgin Islands, and Guantanamo Bay.

=== 1951–1960 ===
During January 1951, the Kleinsmith embarked an Underwater Demolition Team (UDT) at Little Creek to participate in the filming of The Frogmen, a Hollywood film chronicling the adventures of the Navy's UDT divers in the Pacific during World War II. Departing Norfolk on 3 January 1951, the warship stopped at Key West, Florida, and Charlotte Amalie, St. Thomas, United States Virgin Islands, before commencing ten days of filming between 15 January and 6 February. According to the command historian, "Dana Andrews and Richard Widmark helped make the old 'klinker-dinker' a movie star."

Returning from the Caribbean on 13 February 1951, Kleinsmith departed Little Creek on 5 March on the first of four deployments to the Mediterranean Sea. Arriving at Gibraltar on 15 March with UDT personnel embarked, she deployed with the 6th Fleet and participated in amphibious operations that ranged from Oran, Algeria, to Phaleron Bay, Greece. After serving as an amphibious control ship, she departed Gibraltar on 26 June for the United States, arriving at Little Creek on 6 July. On 19 July 1952, she departed for another four-month deployment with the 6th Fleet, and supported its important peace-keeping activities off the troubled lands of the Mediterranean.

Returning to Little Creek on 29 January 1955, Kleinsmith resumed operations along the eastern seaboard to the Caribbean. On 9 January 1957, she again departed for duty with the 6th Fleet, and for almost three months operated in the Eastern Mediterranean. In response to an urgent request from King Hussein of Jordan, whose government was threatened with leftist-oriented, Egyptian-supported subversion, Kleinsmith departed La Spezia, Italy, on 25 April for the Levantine Coast. Arriving off Beirut, Lebanon, on 30 April, she joined ships of the 6th Fleet in a formidable display of seapower, designed to show U.S. determination that the integrity and independence of nations in the Middle East would be guaranteed against Communist subversion or aggression. Remaining on station until 3 May, she then departed Rhodes, Greece, on 18 May, and returned to Little Creek on 1 June.

Less than three months later, Kleinsmith sailed once again for the Mediterranean, arriving at Palermo, Sicily, on 15 September. During the previous August, a pro-Soviet takeover of the Syrian Army had threatened the stability of the Middle East. The high-speed transport proceeded to the Eastern Mediterranean on 19 September, and operated there to prevent aggression and to preserve peace. She departed Barcelona, Spain, on 4 November, and arrived back at Little Creek on 17 November.

In 1958, Kleinsmith continued her activities along the Atlantic coast. While operating out of Guantanamo Bay on 24 October, she rescued 56 U.S. citizens and 3 foreign nationals at Nicaro, Cuba, where they were endangered by military operations between the Cuban Army and the Fidel Castro's rebels. From 27 May to 3 August 1959, she cruised to the Great Lakes via the newly opened St. Lawrence Seaway. On 1 April 1960, Kleinsmith departed Little Creek for the Pacific. Steaming via the Panama Canal, San Diego, Pearl Harbor, and Guam, she arrived Tsoying, Taiwan, on 15 May. Kleinsmith was decommissioned on 16 May 1960, and was transferred the same day to the Nationalist Government of the Republic of China.

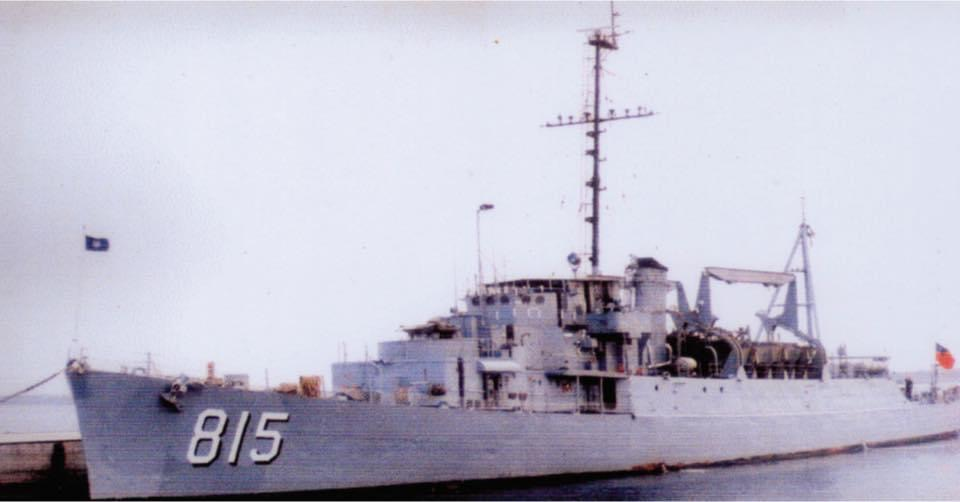
Tien Shan moored, date unknown

=== ROCS Tien Shan ===
The ship served in the Republic of China Navy as ROCS Tien Shan (APD-315), (later renumbered 215, 615, and 815). In the early 1970s, Tien Shan was fitted with a second 5-inch/38 mount aft, a Sea Chaparral surface-to-air missile launcher, and ASW torpedo tubes. At this time, she was re-rated as a patrol frigate. In the 1980s, Tien Shan, and other surviving ships of her class which were also transferred to Taiwan, were assigned to the Customs Service Coastal Patrol command, where they patrolled the economic exclusion zone. In this role, their armament was reduced to just one twin 40 mm mount in front of the bridge. She was still active in this role in 1995. Her decommissioning year is variously reported as 1997 or 1998.
