= USS Broadbill =

Two ships of the United States Navy have been named Broadbill.

- USS Broadbill (SP-823), was a wooden hulled motorboat purchased by the Navy and commissioned on 27 June 1918. She was turned over to the Coast Guard at San Francisco on 3 December 1919.
- USS Broadbill (AM-58), a minesweeper, was laid down 23 July 1941 and commissioned on 13 October 1942. Served during World War II and decommissioned on 25 June 1954.
