= USS Sentinel (AMCU-39) =

Minesweeper of the United States Navy

History

United States
- Name: USS Sentinel current name fishing vessel Sitkin Island
- Builder: Defoe Shipbuilding Company, Bay City, Michigan
- Laid down: 8 February 1944
- Launched: 9 March 1944
- Commissioned: 21 March 1944, as USS LCI(L)-1052
- Decommissioned: September 1946
- Renamed: USS Sentinel, 7 March 1952
- Reclassified: LSIL-1052, 28 February 1949; AMCU-39, 7 March 1952; MHC-39, 7 February 1955
- Stricken: 1 January 1960
- Identification: IMO number: 7308798
- Status: Anchored at Puget Island in cathlamet wa

General characteristics
- Class & type: LCI(L)-351-class large landing craft
- Displacement: 260 long tons (264 t)
- Length: 159 ft (48 m)
- Beam: 23 ft 8 in (7.21 m)
- Draft: 5 ft 8 in (1.73 m)
- Propulsion: 8 × GM diesel engines (4 per shaft), 1,600 bhp (1,193 kW); 2 × variable pitch propellers
- Speed: 14.4 knots (26.7 km/h; 16.6 mph)
- Complement: 41
- Armament: 2 × single 20 mm AA guns

USS Sentinel (AMCU-39) was a LCI(L)-351-class large landing craft of the United States Navy, later converted to an AMCU-7-class coastal minesweeper.

The ship was laid down on 8 February 1944 by the Defoe Shipbuilding Company, Bay City, Michigan; launched on 9 March 1944; and commissioned as USS LCI(L)-1052 on 21 March 1944.

== World War II Pacific operations ==
Following shakedown off the east coast, LCI(L)-1052 reported for duty in the Atlantic Fleet on 6 May 1944, but was reassigned to the 19th (Pacific) Fleet Amphibious Force on 19 July.

On 4 September, the ship anchored in Kwajalein Atoll and remained there until 8 September when she got underway for Eniwetok. Following installation of Army-type radio equipment, LCI(L)-1052 remained in the area ferrying passengers and carrying mail around Eniwetok Island until 12 October.

That day, LCI(L)-1052 set course for the Caroline Islands and entered Ulithi Channel on 21 September. The LCI remained in Ulithi Harbor, ferrying recreation parties for USS Washington (BB-56), until 9 November, when she departed the harbor to rendezvous with USS Cushing (DD-797) and relieve her of a boat in tow. LCI(L)-1052 was busy ferrying passengers and delivering mail and aircraft parts in the Carolines until 25 May 1945, when she sailed for Leyte Gulf.

LCI(L)-1052 remained at Tacloban, Leyte Gulf, until 22 July, performing there the same services she had rendered at Ulithi, until hostilities ended.

In September, she sailed via the Marshalls for Hawaii. On 1 February 1946, LCI(L)-1052 stood out of Pearl Harbor and headed for the west coast. After arriving at San Francisco on 18 February, the landing craft proceeded to Astoria, Oregon, where she reported to the 19th Fleet and was decommissioned in September 1946.

== Reclassification as AMCU-39 ==
On 7 March 1952, LCI(L)-1052 was named and reclassified as USS Sentinel (AMCU-39), and a contract for her conversion into a minesweeper was placed with the Puget Sound Naval Shipyard, Bremerton, Washington. Conversion began on 1 December 1953 and was completed on 18 May 1954, but the vessel saw no further active service. On 7 February 1955, all AMCU's were redesignated MHC's; minehunters, coastal.

== Decommissioning ==
USS Sentinel (AMCU-39) was struck from the Navy list on 1 January 1960.
