= USS Broadbill (AM-58) =

Minesweeper of the United States Navy

History

United States
- Name: USS Broadbill
- Builder: Defoe Shipbuilding Company, Bay City, Michigan
- Laid down: 1942
- Launched: 21 May 1942
- Commissioned: 21 July 1943
- Decommissioned: 3 June 1946
- Recommissioned: 19 March 1952
- Decommissioned: 24 January 1954
- Reclassified: MSF-58, 7 February 1965
- Stricken: 1 July 1972
- Honours and awards: 2 battle stars (World War II)
- Fate: Sold for scrap, 1 December 1973

General characteristics
- Class & type: Auk-class minesweeper
- Displacement: 890 long tons (904 t)
- Length: 221 ft 3 in (67.44 m)
- Beam: 32 ft (9.8 m)
- Draft: 10 ft 9 in (3.28 m)
- Speed: 18 knots (33 km/h; 21 mph)
- Complement: 100 officers and enlisted
- Armament: 1 × 3"/50 caliber gun; 2 × 40 mm guns; 2 × 20 mm guns; 2 × Depth charge tracks

USS Broadbill (AM-58), was an Auk-class minesweeper of the United States Navy, named after the broadbill, a hunters' nickname for the greater scaup, a diving duck common in the winter along the Atlantic coast. Broadbill was launched on 21 May 1942 at the Defoe Shipbuilding Company in Bay City, Michigan, sponsored by Mrs. A. Loring Swasey, wife of Captain Swasey. She was commissioned on 13 October 1942.

== Service history ==
=== 1942–1946 ===
After commissioning, Broadbill reported at Boston, Massachusetts to the Commander, Service Force, Atlantic Fleet.

Until April 1944, she escorted convoys between east coast and Gulf coast ports, and made two voyages to the Caribbean. On 11 April 1944, she got underway for England where she conducted numerous practice sweeps in preparation for the invasion of Normandy.

On 5 June 1944 Broadbill, as a unit of Mine Squadron 7, in company with 10 other minesweepers, cleared the approach channel to Utah Beach for fire support ships, and on 6 June, commenced sweeping the actual support area. On 25 June, she helped clear fire support areas off Cherbourg. Operations were continued off England and France until August.

She then proceeded to Naples, via Oran, Algeria, and conducted sweeping operations in the Ligurian Sea, Strait of Bonifacio, and around Sardinia and Corsica. Completing this assignment, Mine Squadron 7 arrived at Cavalaire Bay in southern France on 23 August 1944 to clear French harbors and approaches during Operation Dragoon, the invasion of Southern France. On 28 May 1945, Broadbill, in company with Mine Division 21, departed for Norfolk, Virginia, where she underwent repairs until 30 August 1945.

On 17 September 1945, in company with Service Squadron 5, Broadbill got underway for San Pedro, California. She was subsequently ordered to Astoria, Oregon, arriving on 7 December for pre-inactivation overhaul. Broadbill went out of commission in reserve at San Diego on 3 June 1946.

=== 1952–1954 ===
Recommissioned on 19 March 1952, Broadbill operated off the California coast until 27 June 1952. She then sailed to Charleston, South Carolina, arriving there on 15 July. During the remainder of 1952, she operated out of Charleston and conducted one Caribbean training cruise.

In January 1953, she proceeded to the Mediterranean for a cruise with the 6th Fleet, returning to Charleston on 21 May 1953. She conducted routine operations off the Atlantic coast until August, when she reported for inactivation overhaul. Broadbill was placed out of commission in reserve on 25 January 1954, berthed at Orange, Texas. She was reclassified MSF-58 on 7 February 1955.

Broadbill was struck from the Navy list on 1 July 1972, and disposed of by Navy sale on 1 December 1973.
