= USS Sentinel (SP-180) =

Patrol vessel of the United States Navy

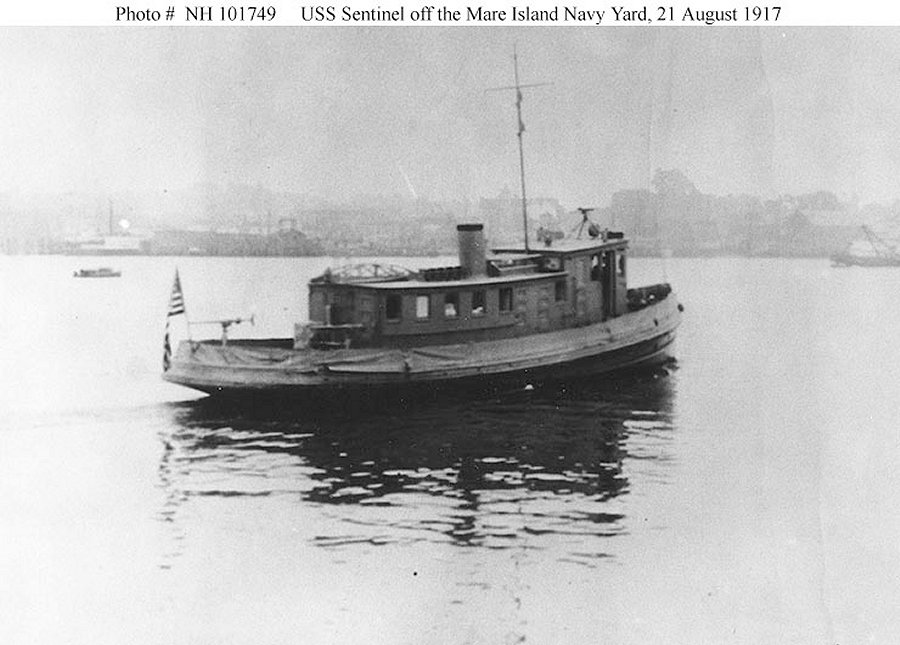

History

United States
- Name: USS Sentinel
- Builder: Pacific Shipyards and Ways Co., Alameda, California
- Launched: 1917
- Commissioned: 9 August 1917
- Decommissioned: 20 March 1919
- Fate: Transferred to the Coast Guard, 18 September 1919

General characteristics
- Displacement: 15 long tons (15 t)
- Length: 64 ft (20 m)
- Beam: 15 ft 8 in (4.78 m)
- Draft: 5 ft 1 in (1.55 m)
- Speed: 9.75 knots (18.06 km/h; 11.22 mph)
- Complement: 8
- Armament: 2 × 1-pounder guns; 1 × machine gun

USS Sentinel (SP-180) was the first United States Navy vessel to bear the name. It was a motorboat built in 1917 by Pacific Shipyards and Ways Co., Alameda, California and was purchased by the United States Navy from W. G. Tibbetts on 9 August 1917 and commissioned the same day.

== World War I Operations ==
Sentinel operated in San Francisco Bay during and after World War I, patrolling the harbor entrance and assisting small vessels.

== Decommissioning ==
She was decommissioned on 20 March 1919, transferred to the United States Coast Guard on 18 September 1919, and renamed Tulare. She was again renamed AB-14 on 6 November 1923, and remained in service until 1934.
