= Defoe Shipbuilding Company =

American ship builder

- Type: Privately held company
- Industry: Shipbuilding and repair
- Founded: 1905
- Defunct: 1976
- Fate: Bankruptcy
- Headquarters: Bay City, Michigan, United States
- Key people: Harry J. Defoe
- Services: Ship Repair
- Owner: Harry J. Defoe and sons

The Defoe Shipbuilding Company was a small ship builder established in 1905 in Bay City, Michigan, United States. It ceased to operate in 1976 after failing to renew its contracts with the United States Navy. The company's former site has since been redeveloped.

== Founding ==
Harry J. Defoe organized the Defoe Boat and Motor Works in 1905 on the Saginaw River in Bay City, Michigan. At that time, the firm built "knock-down" boats and gasoline powered boats for business and pleasure. In 1917, the company got its first Navy contract for five Spent Torpedo Chasers. This order was followed in 1918 by an order for eight steel Tumor Mine Planters.

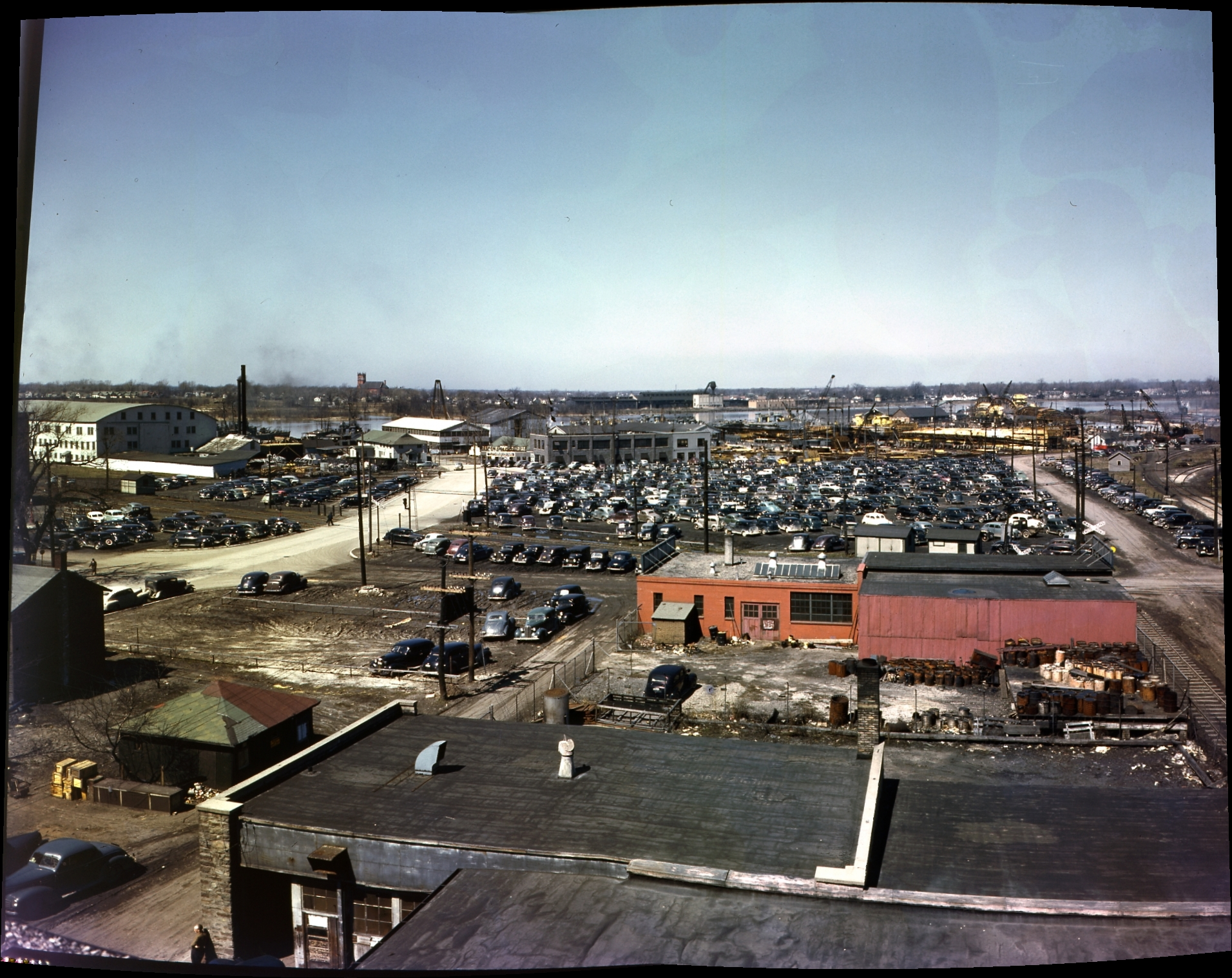
Defoe Shipbuilding Company yards 1944

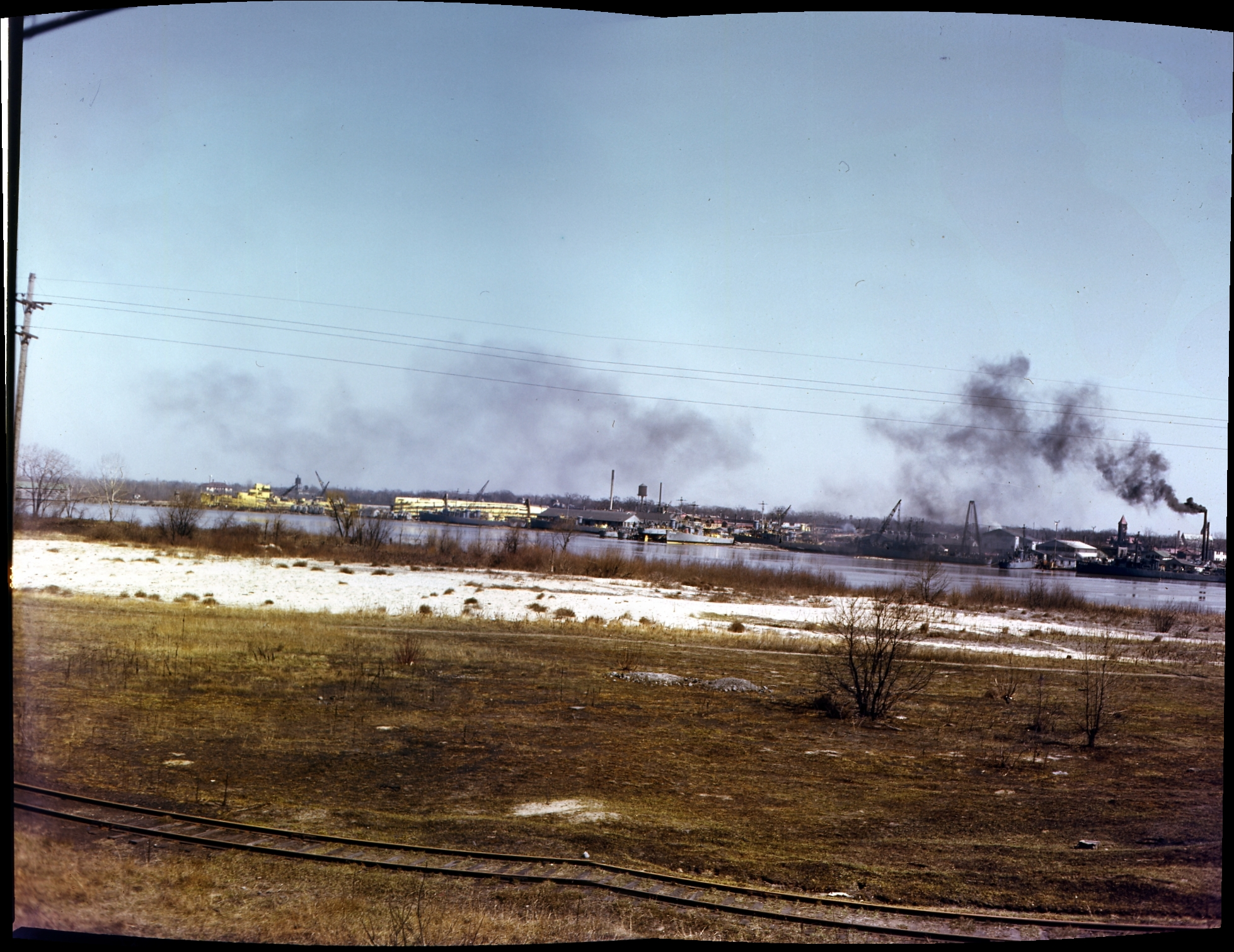
Defoe Shipbuilding Company 1944

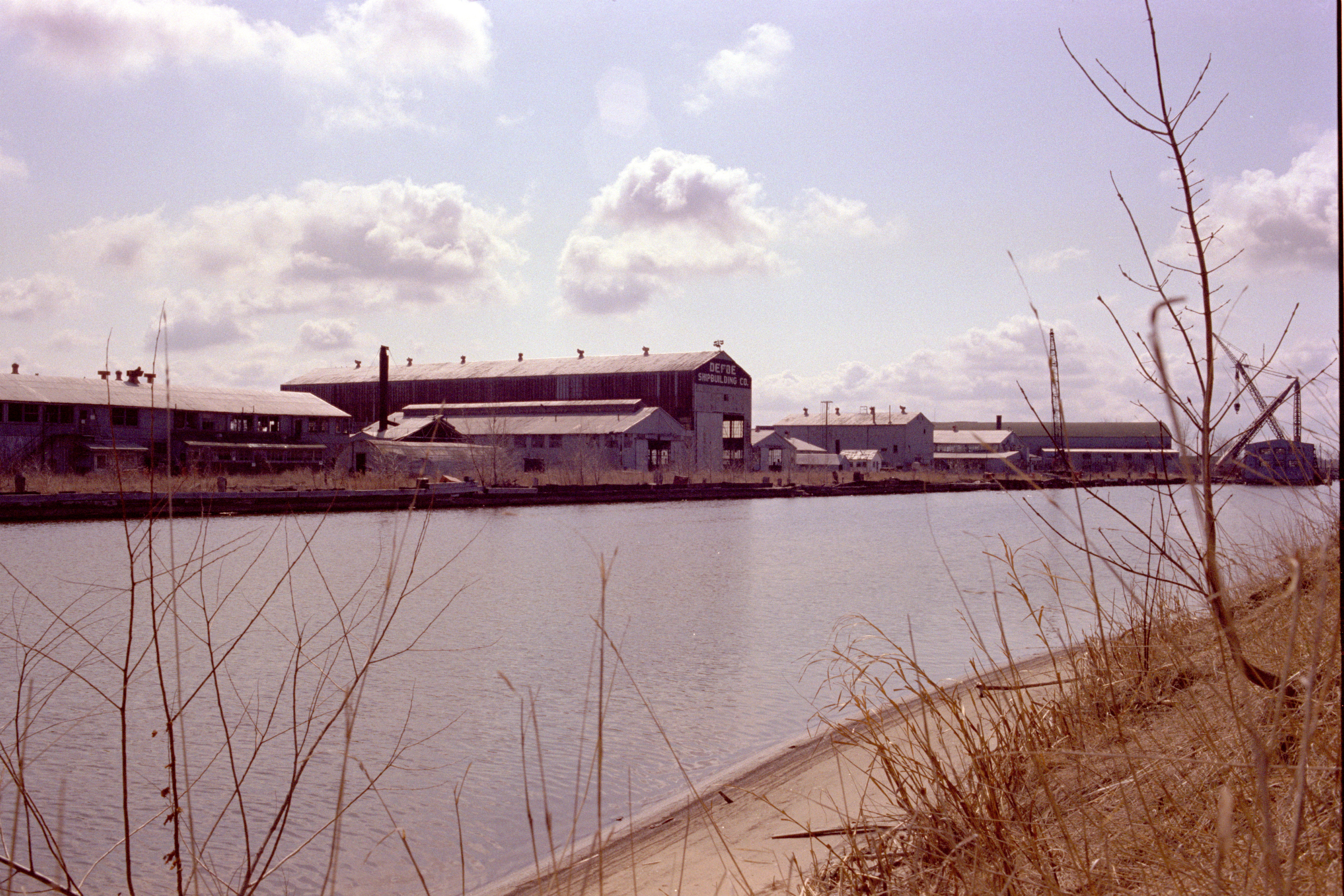
Defoe Shipbuilding Company abandoned 1981

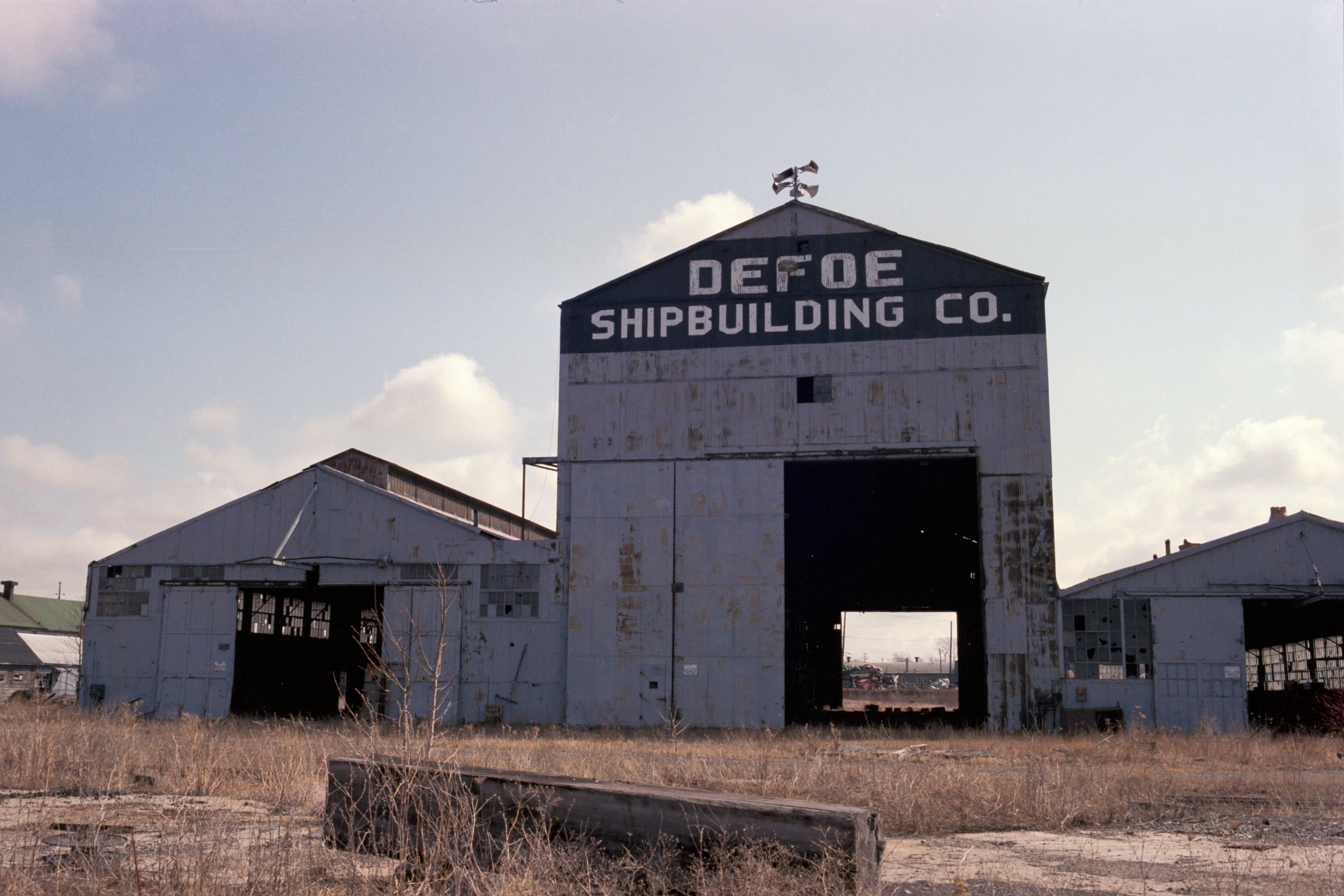
Defoe Shipbuilding Co abandoned 1981

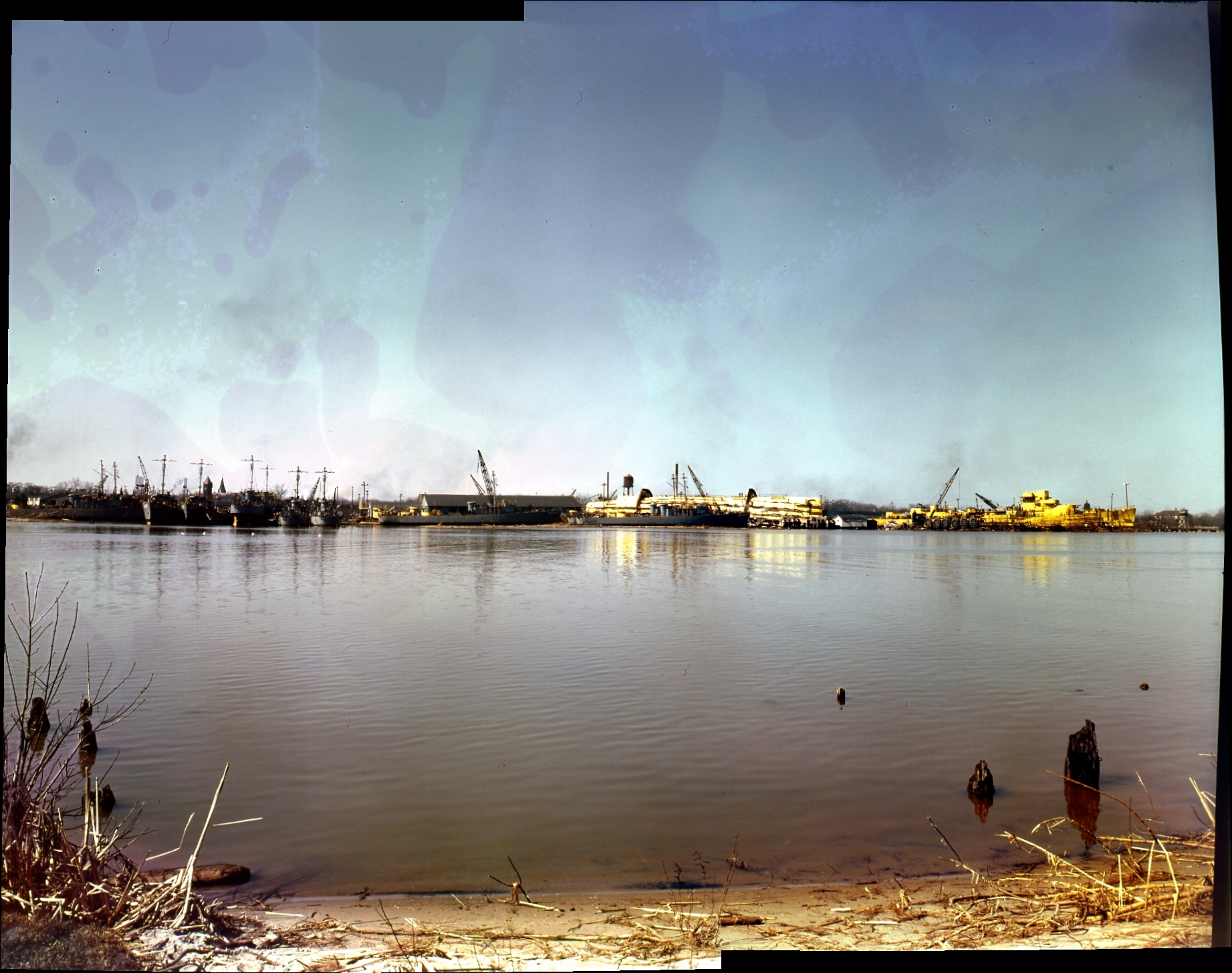
Defoe Shipbuilding WWII 1944

From 1920 to 1939, the company built various types of government and commercial vessels and private yachts, including three 165-ft patrol boats, thirteen 100-ft patrol boats, fifteen 75-foot patrol boats and two harbor tugs for the U.S. Coast Guard. In 1931, Defoe built the Lenore, a 92-foot (28 m) yacht for Montgomery Ward Chairman Sewell Avery, who named it after his second daughter who died at the age of four; this yacht was taken by the U.S. Government in World War II for coastal picket duty by the Coast Guard, and in 1956 it was assigned as a Presidential yacht. It was called the Barbara Anne by President Eisenhower after his granddaughter, the Honey Fitz by President Kennedy in honor of his maternal grandfather John Francis Fitzgerald, and the Tricia by President Nixon after his daughter. In 1941, the name of the company was changed to Defoe Shipbuilding Company.

== World War II ==
During World War II, all production went to the war effort. From 1939 to 1945, the company built 154 ships, including four Auk-class minesweepers, 17 destroyer escorts (of those 3 were converted to APDs after serving as DEs for some time), 11 High speed transports (APDs) (converted destroyer escorts, but launched as such), patrol craft, and numerous landing craft of various types. The brand-new Defoe family yacht even served with the US Navy as a patrol vessel. Defoe developed a construction technique called the "upside-down and roll-over" method. This allowed most of the welding of the hull to be done "hand down" which is much easier. After the hull was completely welded, it was rolled over by a set of large wheels fastened to each end of the hull. Work then continued on the ship right-side up. Faster welding allowed the company to build one 173-foot patrol craft every week. Of all of the major ships built there, the three that were lost in action during World War II were the destroyer escort Rich, the U.S. Coast Guard Cutter Escanaba, and the patrol craft PC-1129. Submarine chaser PC 482 was sunk by a U-boat in 1945. Defoe Shipbuilding Company also built three Refrigerated Freight Barges : YFR-888, YFR-889 and YFR-890 in 1945, also called a reefer barge.

=== List of Ships ===
- 13 of 148 Buckley-class destroyer escorts
  - Bull (DE-693) ... Frybarger (DE-705)
- 4 of 22 Rudderow-class destroyer escorts
  - Holt (DE-706) ... Bray (DE-709)
- 11 of 50 Crosley-class high speed transports
  - Gosselin (APD-126) ... Carpellotti (APD-136)
- 4 of 95 Auk-class minesweepers
  - Broadbill (AM-58) ... Pheasant (AM-61)
- 47 of 923 Landing Craft Infantry
  - LCI(L) 1052 ... LCI(L) 1098
- 56 of 343 PC-461-class submarine chasers
  - PC-471 ... PC-482
  - PC-542 ... PC-549
  - PC-583 ... PC-587
  - PC-1119 ... PC-1149
- 15 of 203 75-foot patrol boats ("Six-Bitters") for the United States Coast Guard
  - CG-115 ... CG-129

== After World War II ==
After World War II, this company built two large Great Lakes bulk carriers, and it did repair work on Great Lakes ships including several repowerings, and self-unloading conversions. In later years, several ships were built for the U.S. Navy, including two Dealey-class destroyer escorts, four Charles F. Adams-class guided missile destroyers, and three Garcia-class destroyer escorts (later re-classified as frigates) for the U.S. Navy, and three guided-missile destroyers for the Royal Australian Navy. Also built there were the research vessels RV Melville and RV Knorr. This last was the ship that found the wreck of RMS Titanic.

== Great Lakes Bulk Freighters ==
In the early 1950s Defoe Shipbuilding constructed two large Great Lakes freighters. They were both roughly based on U.S. Steel's Pittsburgh Steamship Company AA Class ship design and shared similar dimensions. As of April 2023, both of the vessels have been scrapped.

The final large Great Lakes bulk freight vessel built by Defoe Shipbuilding to operate was the 642' 03" long, M/V Ojibway (Defoe hull #00422) operated by the Canadian firm Lower Lakes Towing, of Port Dover, Ontario, Canada. The Ojibway was originally built as the steamer Charles L. Hutchinson (2) for the Pioneer Steamship Company of Cleveland, Ohio, and entered service on September 24, 1952. In 1961, the Hutchinson was sold to Ford Motor Company of Dearborn, Michigan and was renamed Ernest M. Breech. In 1988, Ford was in the process of eliminating its Great Lakes shipping fleet and sold the Breech to George Steinbrenner's Kinsman Marine of Cleveland, Ohio. The Kinsman fleet in turn renamed the vessel Kinsman Independent (2). She sailed with Kinsman until 2002 when her main unloading dock in Buffalo, New York, updated its unloading equipment, allowing it to be serviced by newer more common self-unloading vessels. The vessel laid up in Buffalo for the last time under US flag on December 16, 2002. In the spring of 2004, McKeil Marine of Hamilton, Ontario, Canada purchased the Kinsman Independent. The ship was refurbished and repowered with a diesel engine, then sold to Voyageur Marine Transport LTD., of Ridgeville, Ontario, who returned her to service in late 2005 under the name Voyageur Independent. Her final owner (Lower Lakes Towing) began to operate the vessel on August 28, 2007, and renamed her Ojibway on February 29, 2008. The ship would sail as the Ojibway until the end of the 2021 shipping season, when it was retired by Lower Lakes and sailed to Port Colborne, Ontario in April 2022 to be dismantled by the Marine Recycling Corporation, which completed scrapping the ship in early 2023.

The second Great Lakes freighter built by Defoe was the 644' long S/S Richard M. Marshall (Defoe hull #00424) which was constructed in 1953 for the Great Lakes Steamship Company, of Cleveland, Ohio. She was a near twin to her predecessor (Charles L. Hutchinson) in size and capacity both having approximate dimensions of 640' long, 67' wide, 35' deep, and a cargo capacity of approximately 18,500 tons. In December, 1956, Great Lakes Steamship started the process of selling off their fleet, and the Marshall was sold to The Northwestern Mutual Life Insurance Company. Starting with the 1957 season, Northwestern Mutual chartered the ship to the Wilson Marine Transit Company of Cleveland, Ohio, who in turn renamed the vessel Joseph S. Wood. In 1966, the charter agreement between Wilson and Northwestern Mutual was canceled, and the vessel was sold to the Ford Motor Company of Dearborn, Michigan, for $4.3 million (US). Ford renamed the ship John Dykstra and she resumed trading on the Great Lakes on May 11, 1966. In 1983, Ford renamed the ship Benson Ford (2) after the retirement of the original S/S Benson Ford. In 1985, the vessel was renamed US.265808 (the name Benson Ford being passed on to a third vessel), and was withdrawn from service. The final voyage began when she cleared Quebec City, Quebec, Canada in tow of the Polish tug Jantar on August 11, 1987, along with the former US Steel freighter T. W. Robinson bound for Recife, Brazil, for dismantling.

== Closure ==
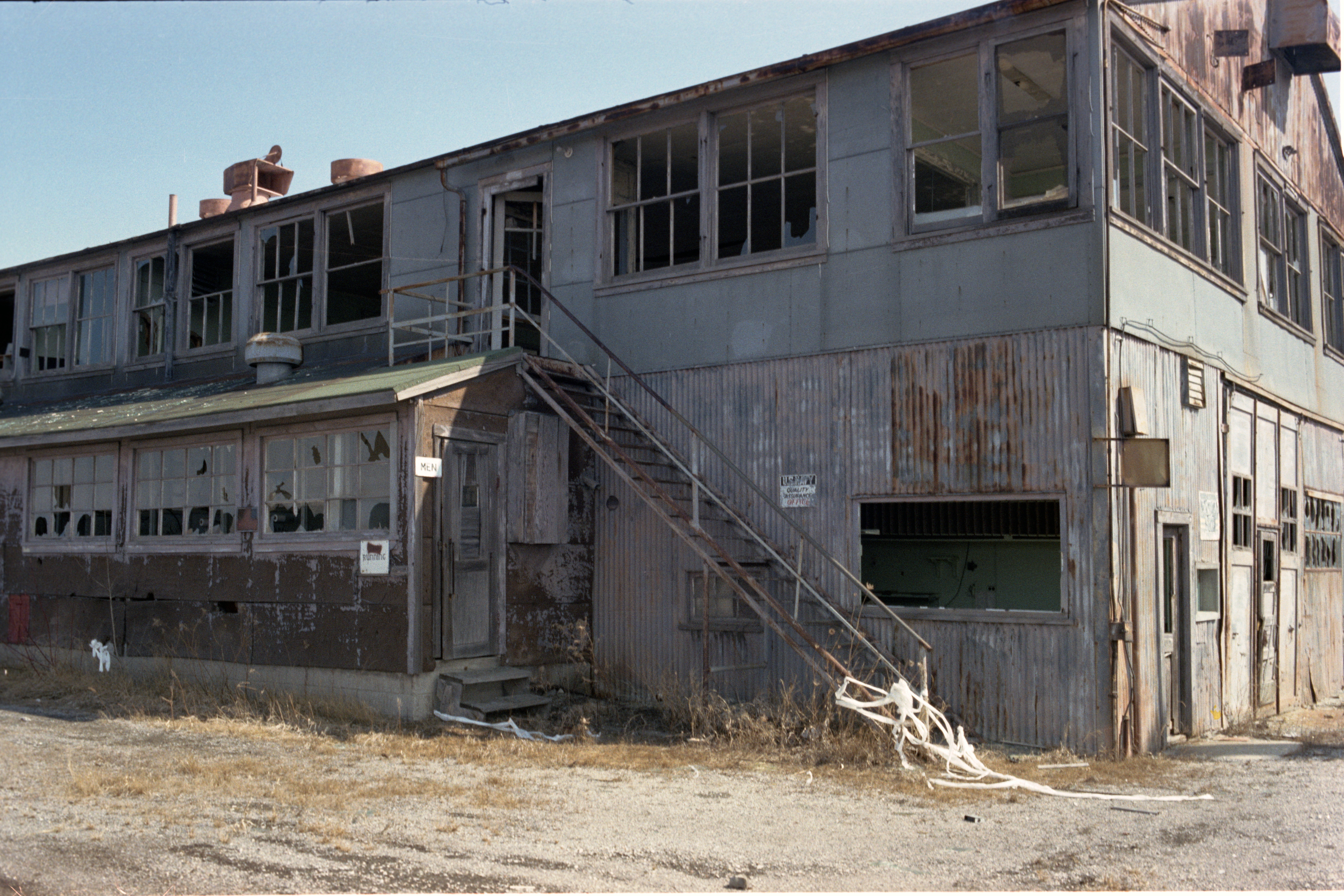
Defoe administration offices 1981

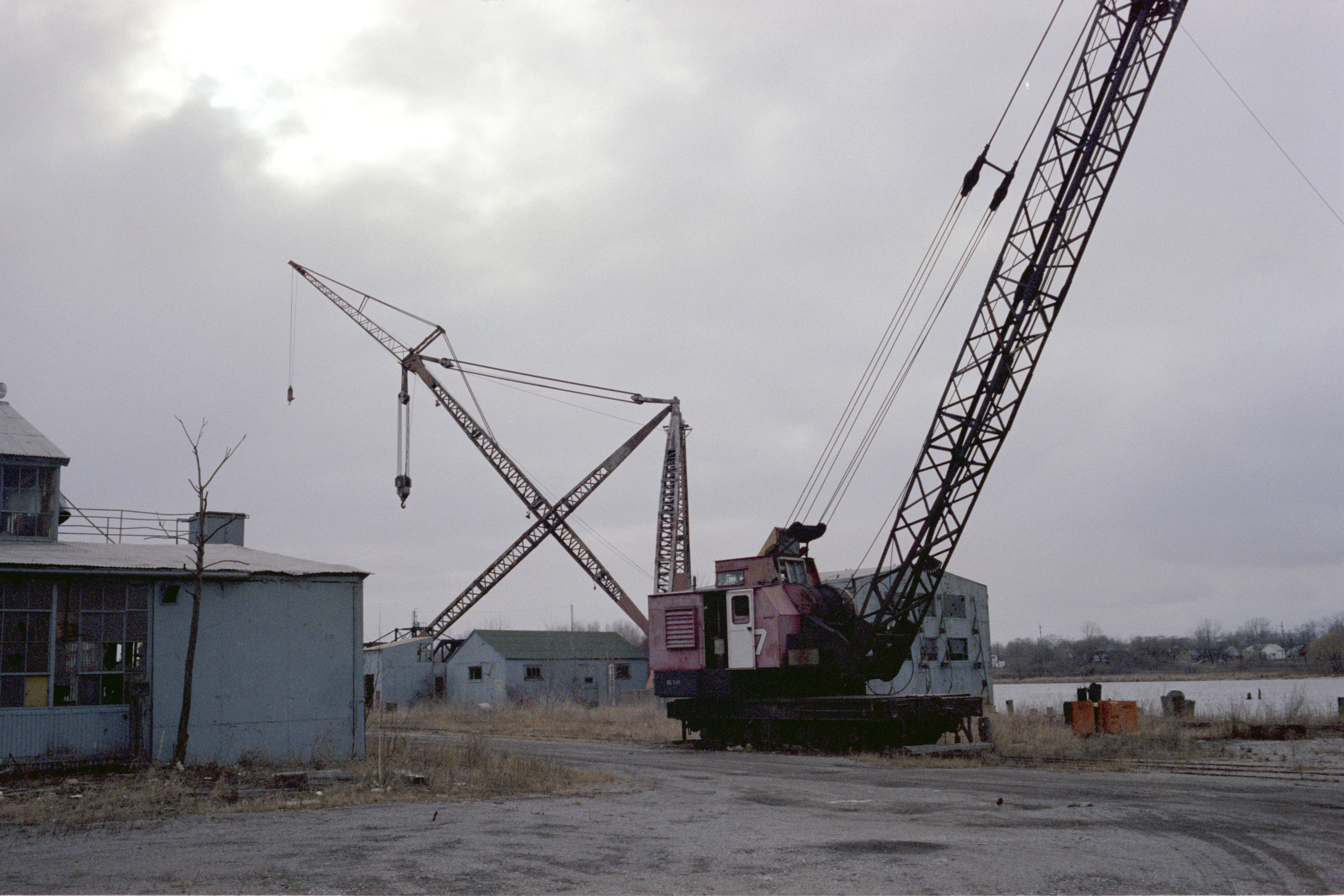
Defoe Shipbuilding Crane

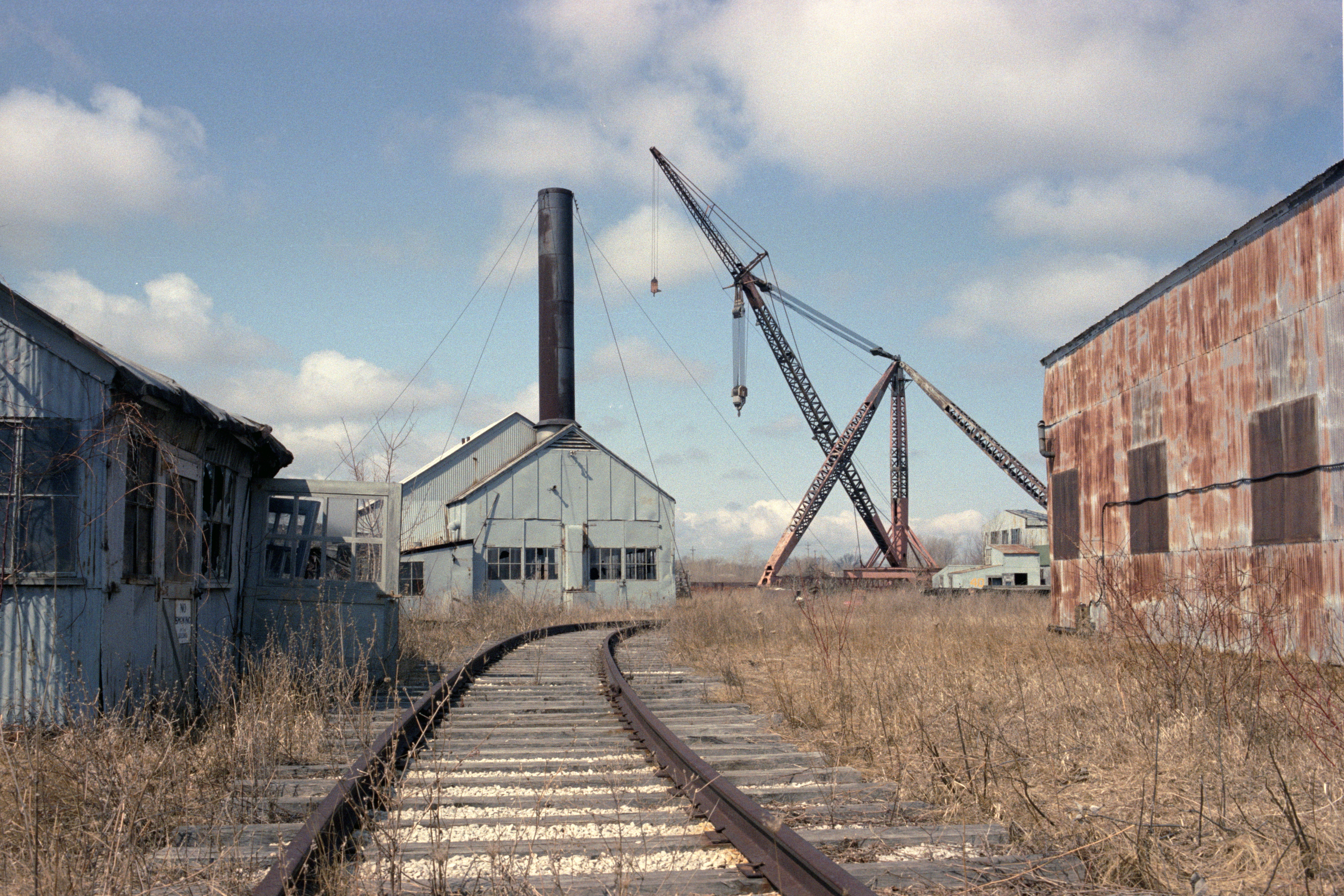
Defoe Shipbuilding Crane and abandoned buildings 1981

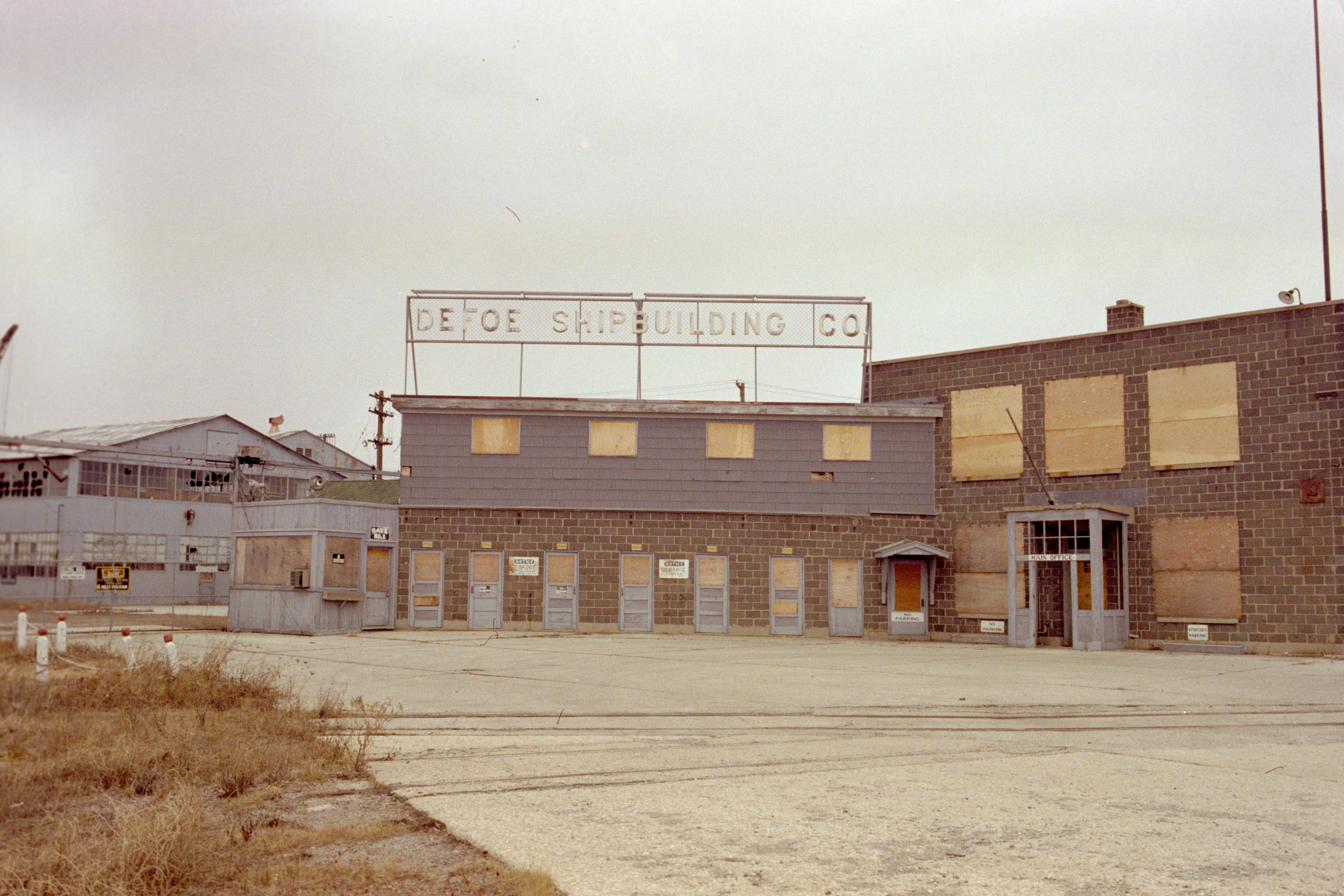
Defoe Shipbuilding abandoned main gate 1981

The yard closed on 31 December 1976 after the Navy contracts expired. Along with its dwindling navy contracts in its final years, the yard was contracted for three larger Great Lakes Freighter projects. The first project was construction of the 68'x 104'7"x 46'6" bow section to the 1000' long integrated tug and barge Presque Isle. The bow was launched July 27, 1972 and was towed to Erie by the tugs Maryland and Laurence C. Turner arriving October 6, 1972. There it was combined with the remainder of the barge which was under construction at Erie, PA. The combined tug and barge unit were the second 1000' vessel trading on the lakes. The second was the conversion of 690' S/S Herbert C. Jackson from a conventional style Great Lakes freighter to a self unloader. The final major project was the conversion of the 620' lake freighter Richard J. Reiss from steam to diesel power. The Presque Isle and Jackson are still activity trading on the Great Lakes. The Reiss, last known as the M/V Manistee was laid up in 2015 and scrapped in 2023. The site of the shipyard later became the location for H. H. Hirschfield & Sons scrap yard. Hirschfield was recently bought by OmniSource, Inc., another scrap company.

== Ships built by the Defoe Shipbuilding Company ==
- USCGC Escanaba (WPG-77) (17 September 1932)
- USCGC Onondaga (WPG-79) (2 August 1934)
- USCGC Tahoma (WPG-80) (5 September 1934)
- USCGC Naugatuck (WYT-92) (23 March 1939)
- USCGC Raritan (WYT-93) (23 March 1939)
- USS Carlinville (PC-1120) (18 January 1943)
- USS Rich (DE-695) (22 June 1943)
- USS Broadbill (AM-58) (21 July 1943)
- USS George (DE-697) (20 November 1943)
- USS Parle DE-708 (8 January 1944)
- USS Holt (DE-706) (15 February 1944)
- USS Sentinel (AMCU-39) (21 March 1944)
- USS Cronin (DE/DEC-704) (5 May 1944)
- USS Jobb (DE-707) (4 July 1944)
- USS Cook (APD-130) (26 August 1944)
- USS Weiss (APD-135) (17 February 1945)
- USS Kleinsmith (DE-718) (12 June 1945)
- USS Courtney (DE-1021) (2 November 1955)
- USS Lester (DE-1022) (5 January 1956)
- USS Lynde McCormick (DDG-8) (28 July 1959)
- USS Robison (DDG-12) (27 April 1960)
- USS Hoel (DDG-13) (4 August 1960)
- HMAS Perth (D 38) (28 September 1963)
- HMAS Hobart (D 39) (9 January 1964)
- USS Voge (FF-1047) (4 February 1965)
- USS Koelsch (FF-1049) (8 June 1965)
- USS O'Callahan (FF-1051) (20 October 1965)
- HMAS Brisbane (D 41) (5 May 1966)
- USNS Wilkes (T-AGS-33) (31 July 1969)
- USNS Wyman (T-AGS-34) (30 October 1969)
- Presque Isle (27 July 1972)

== Gallery ==
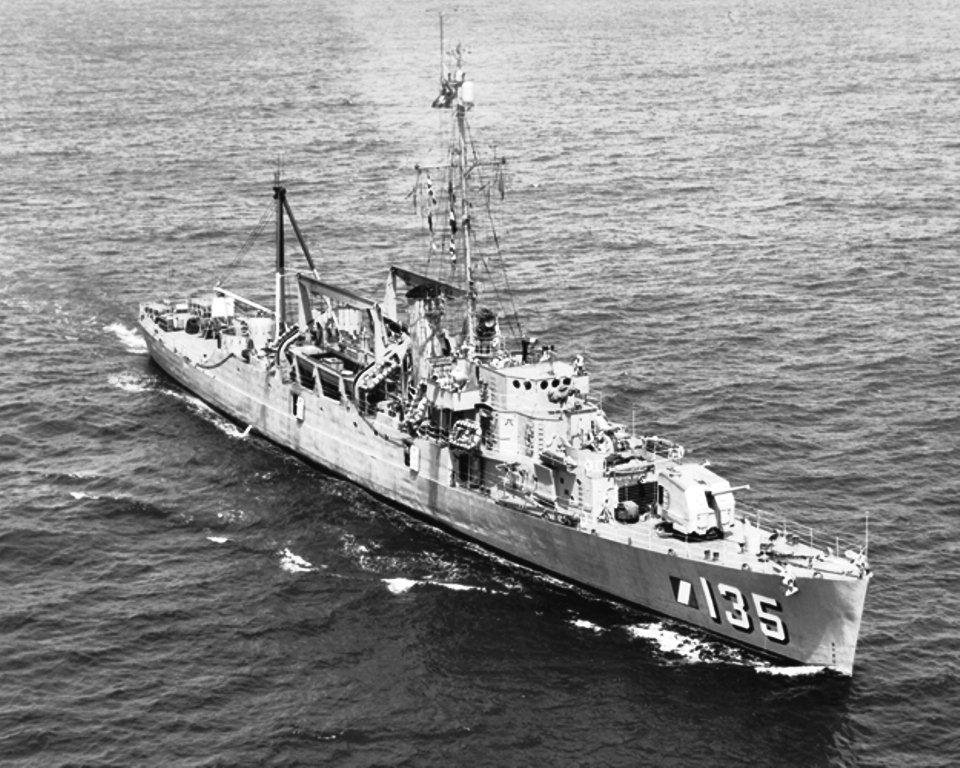
USS Weiss #292

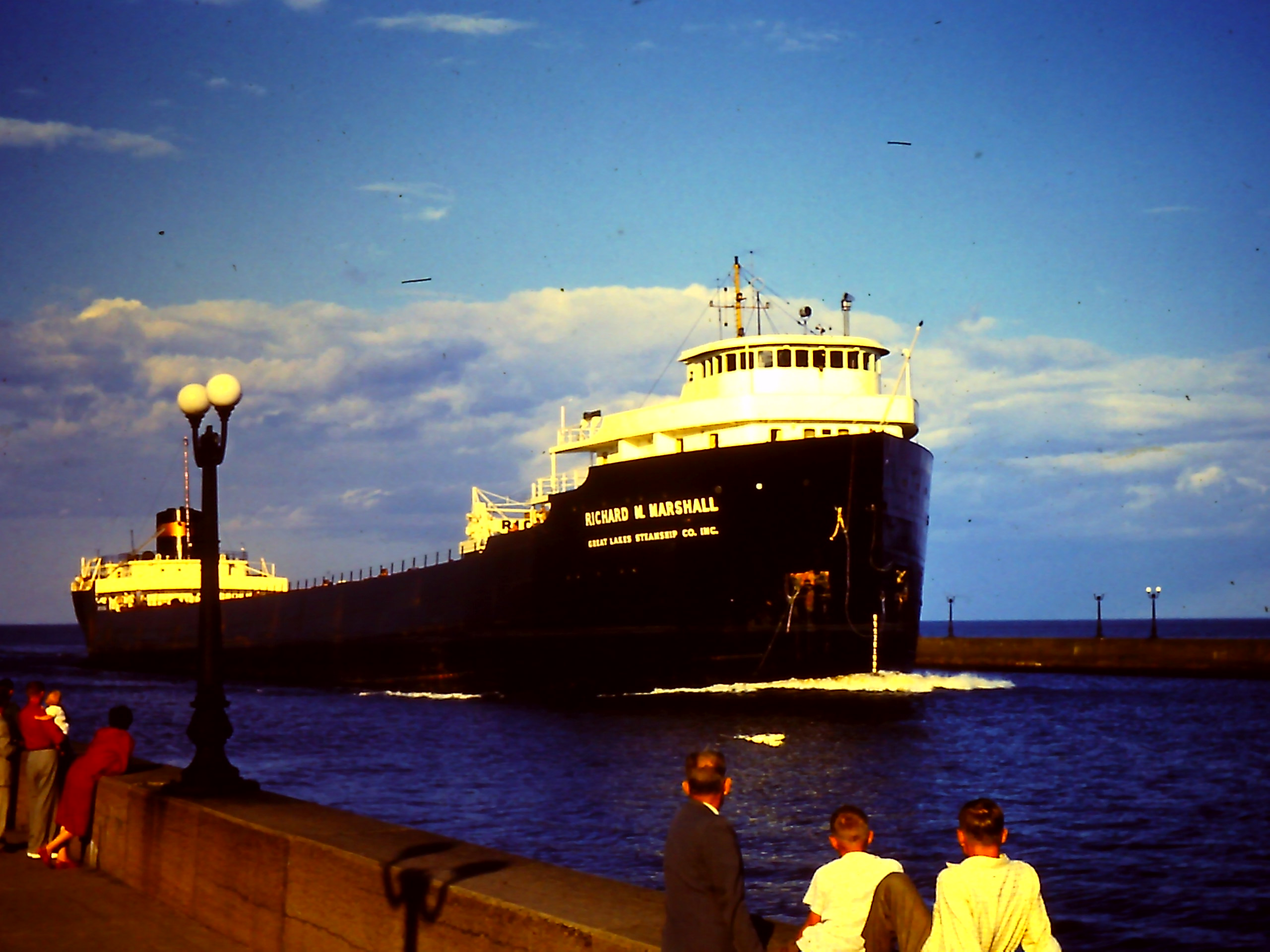
Richard M. Marshall #424

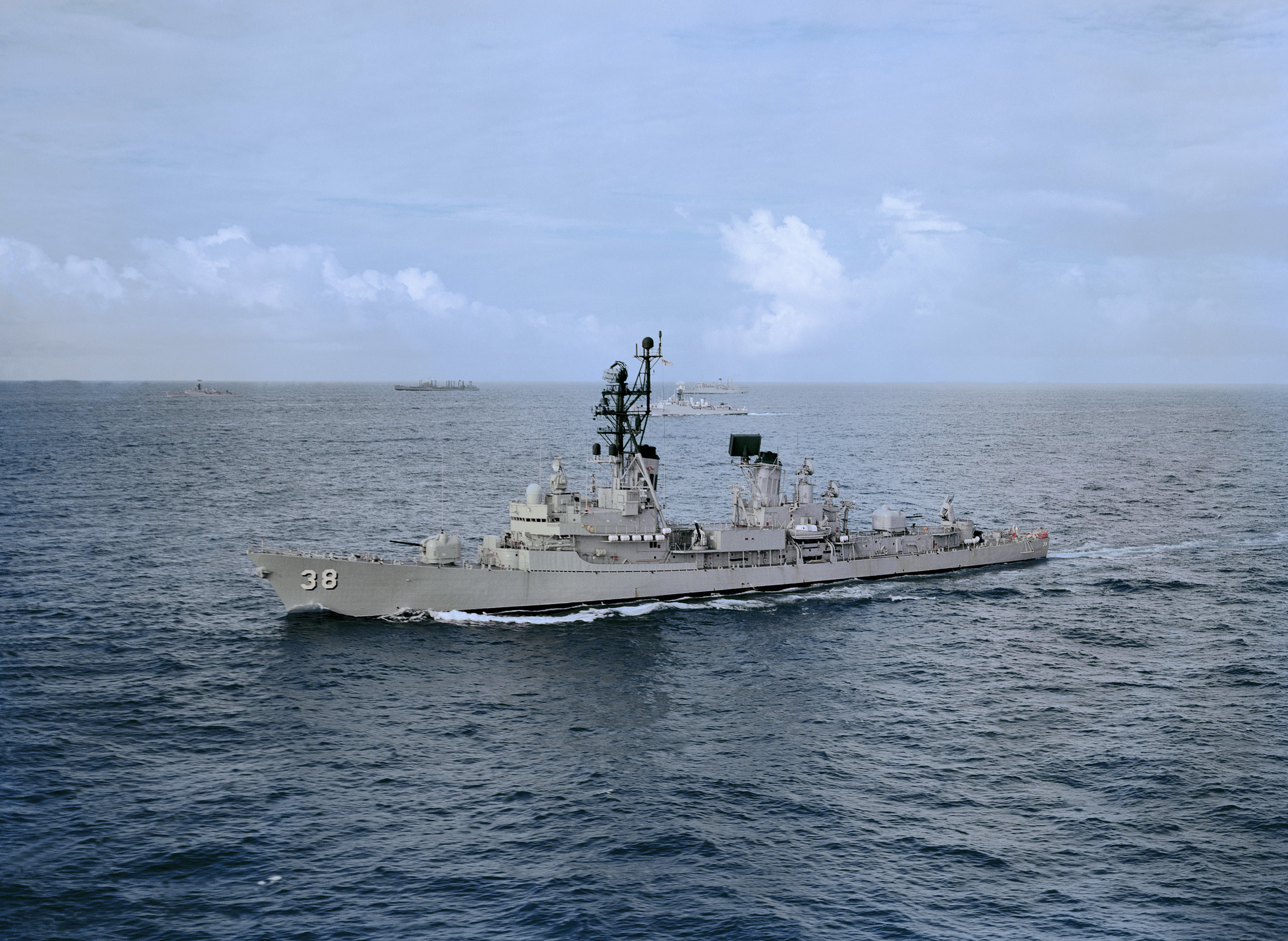
HMAS Perth #435

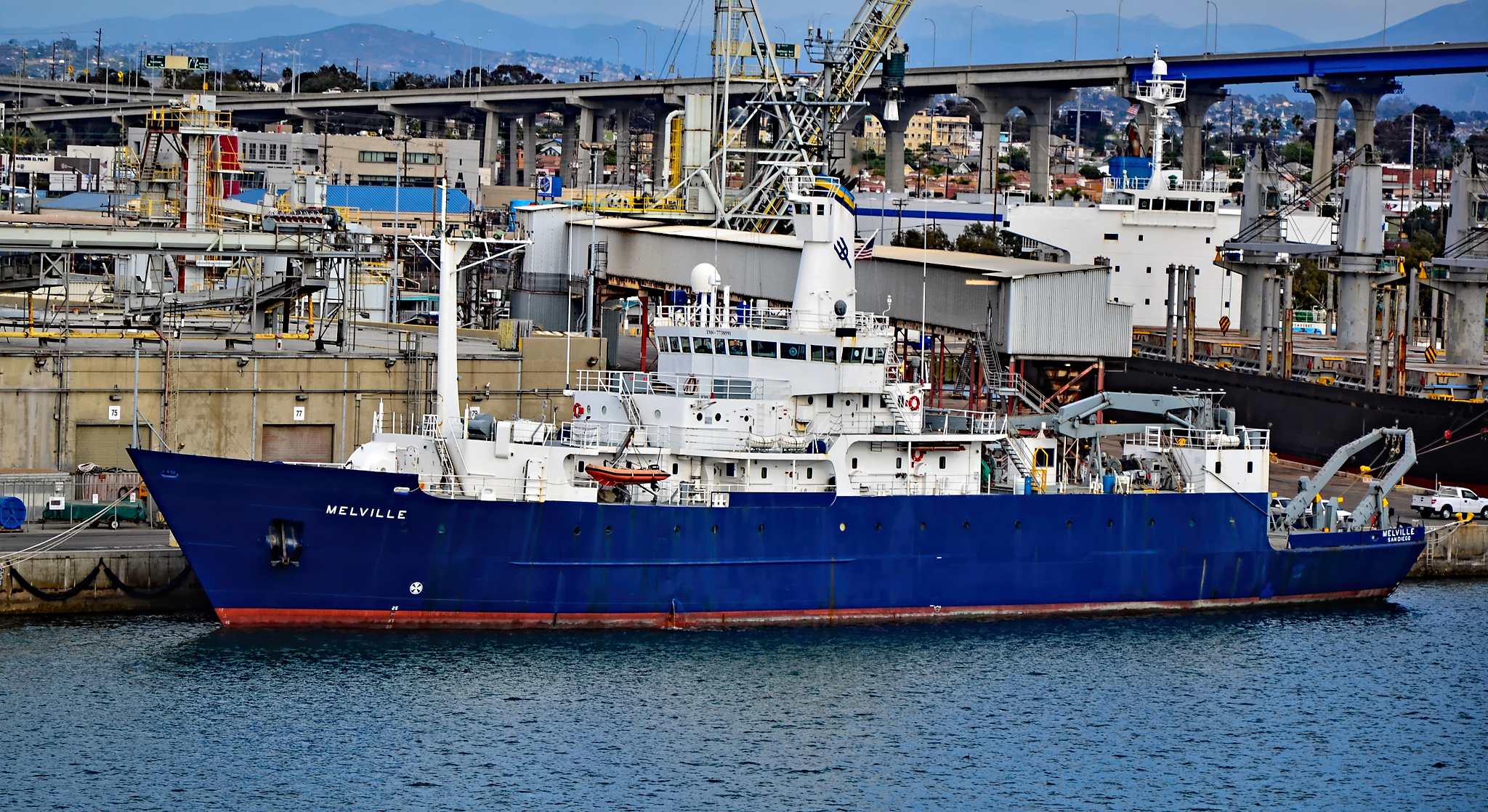
Melville #442

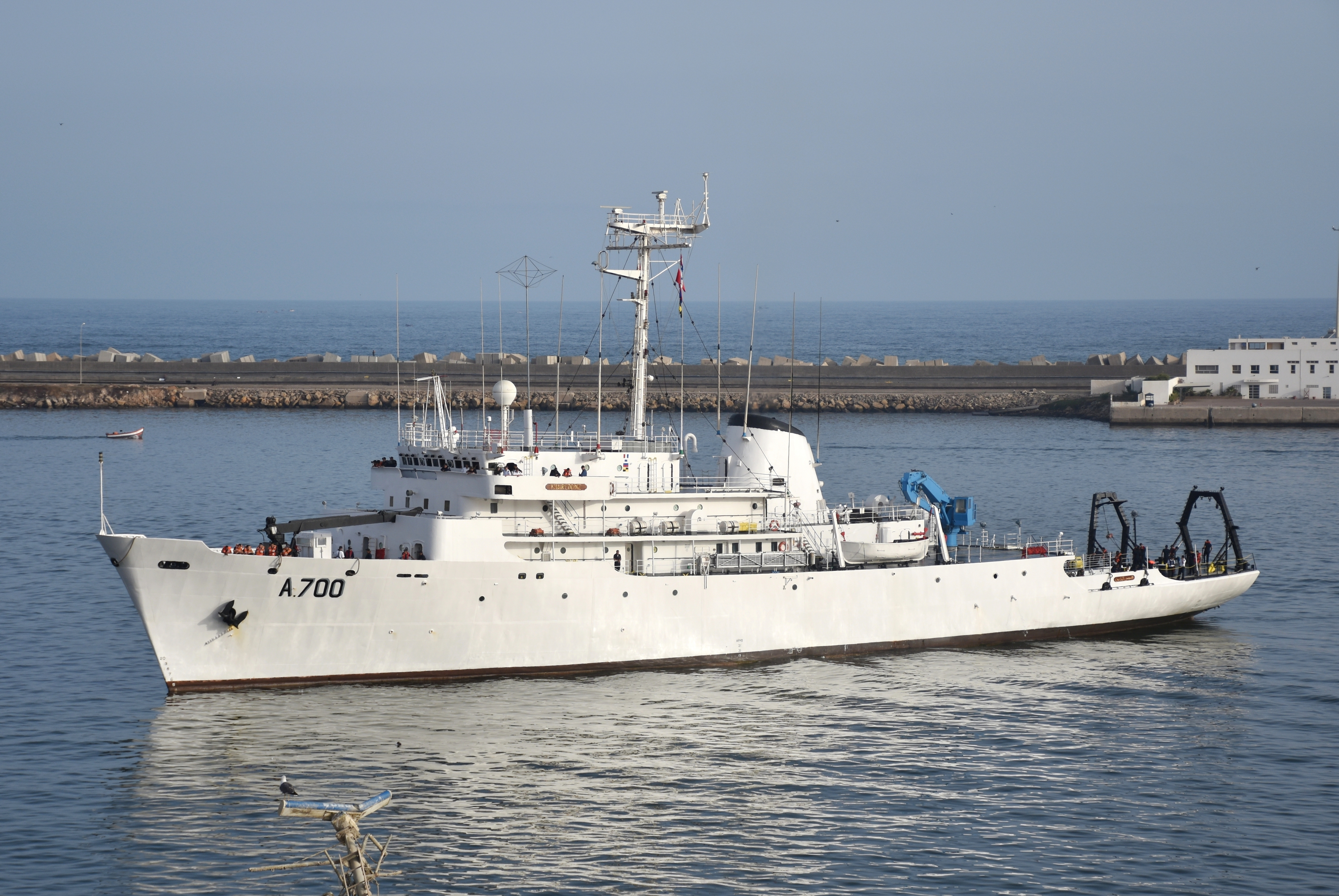
NRF Khaireddine #444

== See also ==
- Lightship Huron
- Wooden boats of World War 2
