= Chukwuemeka Odumegwu Ojukwu =

Nigerian politician and military leader (1933–2011)

1st President of Biafra
- In office 30 May 1967 – 8 January 1970
- Vice President: Philip Effiong
- Preceded by: Position created (Himself as the Governor of Eastern Region, Nigeria)
- Succeeded by: Philip Effiong

Governor of Eastern Region, Nigeria
- In office 19 January 1966 – 27 May 1967
- Preceded by: Francis Akanu Ibiam
- Succeeded by: Ukpabi Asika (East Central State); Alfred Diete-Spiff (Rivers State); Uduokaha Esuene (South-Eastern State)

Personal details
- Born: Chukwuemeka Odumegwu Ojukwu; 4 November 1933 Zungeru, British Nigeria
- Died: 26 November 2011 (aged 78) London, UK
- Party: Nigerian Military, Biafran military, later NPN, APGA
- Spouse(s): Elizabeth Okoli; Njideka Odumegwu-Ojukwu; Stella Ojukwu; Bianca Odumegwu-Ojukwu
- Children: 7
- Education: King's College, Lagos; University of Western Ontario; Epsom College; University of Oxford (M.A. History); Mons Officer Cadet School
- Profession: Soldier, politician

Military service
- Allegiance: Nigeria; United Nations; Biafra
- Branch/service: Nigerian Army; United Nations Peacekeeping; (Republic of Biafra) Biafran Armed Forces
- Years of service: 1957–1967 (Nigerian Army); 1967–1970 (Biafran Army)
- Rank: Lieutenant Colonel (Nigerian Army); General (Biafran Armed Forces)
- Battles/wars: Congo Crisis; Nigerian Civil War

Chukwuemeka Odumegwu Ojukwu (4 November 1933 – 26 November 2011) also known as Ikemba, was a Nigerian military officer and politician who served as President of Biafra from 1967 to 1970. As the military governor of the Eastern Region of Nigeria, which he declared as the independent state of Biafra, Ojukwu led the Biafran forces during the Nigerian Civil War against the Nigerian government forces.

Born in Zungeru, British Nigeria to Louis Odumegwu Ojukwu, a wealthy Igbo businessman, Ojukwu was educated at King's College, Lagos and Epsom College in Surrey, England. He proceeded to Lincoln College, Oxford University where he obtained a master's degree in Modern History in 1955. He returned to Nigeria to serve as an administrative officer and would later join the Nigerian army. Following the independence of Nigeria in 1960, a group of military officers overthrew Nigeria's civilian government in the 1966 Nigerian coup d'état and Johnson Aguiyi-Ironsi became the head of state. Ironsi appointed Ojukwu as military governor of the Eastern Region mostly dominated by the Igbo tribe. (Note: The Hausa and Yoruba army officers feared an Igbo-dominated government which resulted in the 1966 Nigerian counter-coup and subsequently, the 1966 anti-Igbo pogrom)

In response to the demands of the protection of the Igbos in the then-Eastern region from being killed in several parts of the country - particularly the Northern parts of Nigeria, Ojukwu reorganised the Eastern Region as the Republic of Biafra, and he declared independence from Nigeria. Nigeria invaded Biafra, sparking the Nigerian Civil War which has been argued in many quarters as a genocide against the Igbos of the then-Eastern region. The Nigerian military, with support from the United Kingdom and the Soviet Union, blockaded Biafra and cut food supplies, which created a mass famine. Ojukwu made use of foreign media to highlight the plight of Biafran civilians and depict the war as genocide against Igbos. The shocking images of starving Biafran civilians turned the war into an international media sensation, as this was one of the first globally televised wars alongside the Vietnam War. Biafra received international humanitarian relief during the Biafran airlift.

Biafra eventually capitulated to Nigerian forces in 1970 after millions of Biafran civilians died. Ojukwu subsequently fled to Ivory Coast in exile, where President Félix Houphouët-Boigny, who recognised Biafra as a sovereign and independent state, granted him political asylum. In 1981, newly democratically elected Nigerian president Shehu Shagari granted amnesty to Ojukwu, allowing him to return to Nigeria without facing political or legal consequences from the war. Ojukwu spent the remainder of his life unsuccessfully attempting to return to Nigerian politics as a democratically elected politician rather than a military ruler.

He died in 2011 at the age of 78 in London, England. His body was returned to Nigeria, where Nigerian president Goodluck Jonathan arranged a state funeral. He was buried with full military honours, including a 21-gun salute from the Nigerian Army, and thousands of people attended his funeral. Ojukwu remains a contentious figure in the history of Nigeria. Many Igbo people regard him as a hero and a messianic figure who did what was necessary to ensure the survival of Nigeria's Eastern population while facing the possibility of a genocide after the 1966 coup. Other Nigerians have deemed Biafra's secession unnecessary, blaming Ojukwu for the events of the war and accusing him of oppressing Biafra's non-Igbo ethnic minorities.

== Early life and education ==
Ojukwu aged 36 attends a military parade, Ahiara in Mbaise (1969)

Ojukwu was born as the second son of business tycoon Louis Odumegwu Ojukwu. (Note: His given name Odumegwu wasn't inline with the Christian naming guideline, so he was baptized to Louis Philippe. He kept answering the name until he was knighted by the British Crown before he changed back to his name through Emeka's suggestion; he was still known as Louis Ojukwu.) Louis was the son of a clan chief from Nnewi, Anambra State. Louis married at the age of twenty five to a young wife and after a short union, they separated. Before then, the wife lived at Zungeru, a village in Northern Nigeria. After the birth of Ojukwu in November 1933, Louis visited from Lagos and reclaimed Chukwuemeka, his given name.

World War II broke out when Ojukwu was seven. His father sent him to St. Patrick's School and CMS Grammar School both in Lagos. In 1944 at the age of 10, Ojukwu started studying at King's College, Lagos. In 1945 when Ojukwu had stayed for two years in Kings College, his father, who wanted him to be educated in England, made consultations from his English friend. Epsom College in Surrey was recommended and by 1946 Louis sent Ojukwu there for an advanced education. Ojukwu stayed at Epsom for six years. During that time, he excelled in academics as well as in sports and athletics. He played rugby for the college winning the spring javelin throwing and discus. At 18 he entered Lincoln College, Oxford and studied briefly in 1952. Louis wanted his son to be a lawyer as it was the most common course in Nigeria to have been studying at the time but Ojukwu wanted to read modern history. Between 1952 and 1955 he studied law and later switched to history. He also joined the West African Students' Union in Oxford. During his final years, he joined Oxford Rugby Union as wing three quarter in Lincoln College's team. Ojukwu graduated with a B.A in arts in 1955 and travelled back to Lagos. He would later return to Oxford to obtain his M.A.

== Early career ==
Ojukwu conferred on "Eze Igbo Gburugburu" (King of all Igbo people in the universe) May 4, 1996

After informing his reluctant parents, Ojukwu joined the Nigerian Civil Service in Udi, as an Assistant District Officer. He was posted to the East since local authorities mandated all young civil administrators to serve in the Eastern Region. He hardly spoke Igbo since he was born in the north, raised in the west, and educated in England, hence, he could speak English and Yoruba fluently, and satisfactory Hausa. Ojukwu started learning Igbo in order to communicate with the people. Throughout his stay in Udi and other later postings in Umuahia and Aba from 1955 to 1957, he stayed with people living in bushes. From Aba, he was posted to Calabar. His father, believing the superstition that Efik women cast spells and bewitch young men, he called his friend, the then Governor-general, John Stuart Macpherson, to terminate the appointment, which he did.

Ojukwu became angry about the termination, and he then applied to join the Nigerian Army in 1957. His reason was to escape the influence of his father over his chosen career. The Nigerian army was regarded as a small administration that people who held commissioned offices had their last degree from primary school. Seeing Ojukwu apply to join the military, surprised the Governor-general, high Army Commands, and his father. Louis, through Macpherson, ensured that Ojukwu is denied officer cadetship, hence he would not enter as a private soldier, which is more difficult but Ojukwu still Joined as a private soldier at the Army Recruit Depot in Zaria. During a recruit training by Sergeant Moussa Fort-Lamy, Ojukwu corrected his English speaking errors. Surprised by that, he sent Ojukwu to be interviewed by the Depot commander and subsequently apply for an officer commission-cadetship. It took a month for the paper to be out and during the waiting, Ojukwu was assigned the duty of escorting the wife and daughter of the Colonel in their horse ride and tennis parties. (Note: During that time, only a few Igbo people could ride a horse. Ojukwu was able to ride a horse since he had learnt it while studying at Epsom College.)

The application was successful, and from Zaria, Ojukwu first moved to Teshie in Ghana and then to Officer Cadet School in Eaton Hall, England in February 1958. After a six months course, Ojukwu became a Second Lieutenant and before returning to Nigeria in November, he visited Infantry School, Warminster and Small Arms School, Hythe. In Nigeria, Ojukwu was posted to the 5th Battalion in Kaduna. He was sent to Ghana's Teshie Frontal School in 1959, to teach infantry tactics, and one of his student was Murtala Muhammed. From Teshie, he taught military law at the Ghana Academy. A British Brigadier, who was on a visit to Nigeria, requested that Ojukwu return as his staff in the brigade at Apapa. The Nigerian Army at Central Lagos disputed the request and asked Ojukwu to report to the headquarters in January 1961. Ojukwu returned to Nigeria to witness the 1960 Nigerian Independence but returned to Ghana to finish his work. He returned again to Nigeria before Christmas in 1960 and saw he was already promoted to the rank of a captain. From January 1961 to mid 1961, he worked as a staff of branch A of the new Nigerian army headquarters located within the building of the Defense ministry in Lagos. After the independence, many British army officers were removed and there were more space for new administration. It was six months of Ojukwu's captaincy when he was promoted to the rank of a Major in the summer of 1961.

Shortly after his promotion, Ojukwu was sent to Kaduna as a staff officer of the 1st Brigade. Zaire also had independence in 1960 and had begun to break into Katanga, a rich in minerals province. At the end of 1961, the 1st Brigade were sent there and took over the works of the United Nations (UN) forces at Luluaboury. Ojukwu served as the Adjutant to the British commander, Brigadier Mackenzie. (Note: During this period, Murtala Muhammed, a Lieutenant got into trouble and MacKenzie had court-martial him in order to be dismissed from the Nigerian Army. Ojukwu pleaded to Mackenzie who disagreed. He sent a petition to Lagos and General Welty Everard, the general officer of the Nigerian Army accepted and overruled Mackenzie. The court martial was cancelled.) The British Government informed Lagos about the remaining single vacancy of one Nigerian officer to attend the Joint Service Command and Staff College (JSSC) course in 1962. (Note: The JSSC course was the hardest to pass and it was only open to officers who have already passed the Staff College course and have reached the rank of brigadiers.)

== 1966 coups and events leading to the Nigerian Civil War ==
Emeka Ojukwu

Lieutenant-Colonel Ojukwu was in Kano, northern Nigeria, when Major Kaduna Nzeogwu on 15 January 1966 executed and announced the bloody military coup in Kaduna, also in northern Nigeria. It is to Ojukwu's credit that the coup lost much steam in the north, where it had succeeded. Lt. Col. Odumegwu-Ojukwu supported the forces loyal to the Supreme Commander of the Nigerian Armed Forces, Major-General Aguiyi-Ironsi. Major Nzeogwu was in control of Kaduna, but the coup had failed in other parts of the country.

Aguiyi-Ironsi took over the leadership of the country and thus became the first military head of state. On Monday, 17 January 1966, he appointed military governors for the four regions. Lt. Col. Odumegwu-Ojukwu was appointed Military Governor of the Eastern Region. Others were: Lt.-Cols Hassan Usman Katsina (North), Francis Adekunle Fajuyi (West), and David Akpode Ejoor (Mid West). These men formed the Supreme Military Council with Brigadier B.A.O. Ogundipe, Chief of Staff, Supreme Headquarters, Lt. Col. Yakubu Gowon, Chief of Staff Army HQ, Commodore J. E. A. Wey, Head of Nigerian Navy, Lt. Col. George T. Kurubo, Head of Air Force, Col. Sittu Alao.

By 29 May, the 1966 anti-Igbo pogrom started. This presented problems for Odumegwu Ojukwu, as he did everything in his power to prevent reprisals and even encouraged people to return, as assurances for their safety had been given by his supposed colleagues up north and out west.

On 29 July 1966, a group of officers, including Majors Murtala Muhammed, Theophilus Yakubu Danjuma, and Martin Adamu, led the majority of Northern soldiers in a mutiny that later developed into a "Counter-Coup" or "July Rematch". The coup failed in the South-Eastern part of Nigeria where Ojukwu was the military Governor, due to the effort of the brigade commander and hesitation of northern officers stationed in the region (partly due to the mutiny leaders in the East being Northern whilst being surrounded by a large Eastern population).

The Supreme Commander General Aguiyi-Ironsi and his host Colonel Fajuyi were abducted and killed in Ibadan. On acknowledging Ironsi's death, Ojukwu insisted that the military hierarchy be preserved. The most senior army officer after Ironsi was Brigadier Babafemi Ogundipe. However, the leaders of the countercoup insisted that Lieutenant Colonel Yakubu Gowon be made head of state, although both Gowon and Ojukwu were of the same rank in the Nigerian Army. Ogundipe could not muster enough force in Lagos to establish his authority as soldiers (Guard Battalion) available to him were under Joseph Nanven Garba, who was part of the coup. This realisation led Ogundipe to opt-out. Thus, Ojukwu's insistence could not be enforced by Ogundipe unless the coup plotters agreed (which they did not). The fallout from this led to a standoff between Ojukwu and Gowon, leading to the sequence of events that resulted in the Nigerian Civil War.

== Biafra ==
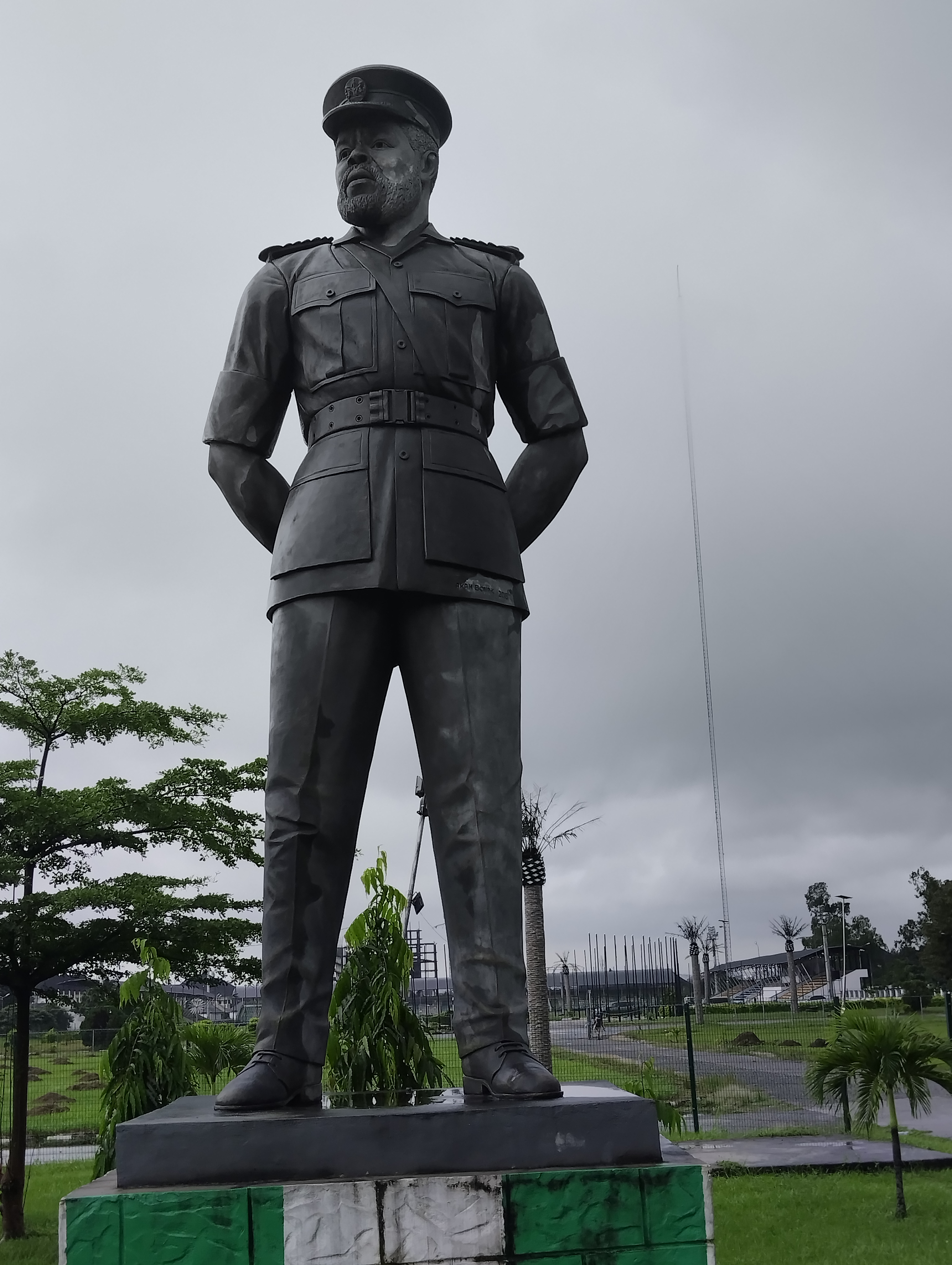
Ojukwụ statue at Owerri in Imo State

Following the incessant killings of Igbos all over the nation as a result of tribal intolerance and fear of domination by Igbos with figures ranging from about 4,000 to 30,000 dead, maimed and missing, Ojukwu, being the southeastern general and Yakubu Gowon who was selected as the supreme general and head of state agreed to hold a peace conference in Aburi, Ghana hosted by General Joseph Ankrah. An agreement of autonomy was reached by the two parties where the southeastern region will become independent. However, on reaching Nigeria, Gen. Yakubu Gowon breached the agreement and failed to implement the system of autonomy and further declaring war against the agreed secession of southeastern Nigeria. On 30 May 1967, Ojukwu declared the independence of Biafra, after an official vote of secession conducted in the Eastern Region.

Having mandated me to proclaim on your behalf, and in your name, that Eastern Nigeria is a sovereign independent Republic, now, therefore I, Lieutenant Colonel Chukwuemeka Odumegwu-Ojukwu, Military Governor of Eastern Nigeria, by the authority, and under the principles recited above, do hereby solemnly proclaim that the territory and region known as and called Eastern Nigeria together with her continental shelf and territorial waters, shall, henceforth, be an independent sovereign state of the name and title of The Republic of Biafra.

On 6 July 1967, Gowon declared war and attacked Biafra. In addition to the Aburi Accord that tried to avoid the war, there was also the Niamey Peace Conference under President Hamani Diori (1968) and the OAU-sponsored Addis Ababa Conference (1968) under the chairmanship of Emperor Haile Selassie. This was the final effort by Generals Ojukwu and Gowon to settle the conflict via diplomacy.

During the war, in 1967, some members of the July 1966 alleged coup plot and Major Victor Banjo were executed for treason with the approval of Ojukwu, the Biafran Supreme commander. Major Ifeajuna was one of those executed. The defendants had argued that they sought a negotiated ceasefire with the federal government and were not guilty of treason.

After two and a half years of fighting and starvation, a hole appeared in the Biafran front lines, and the Nigerian military exploited this. As it became obvious that the war was lost, Ojukwu was convinced to leave the country to avoid prosecution, incarceration or even summary execution. On 9 January 1970, he handed over power to his second in command, Chief of General Staff Major-General Philip Effiong, and left for Ivory Coast, where President Félix Houphouët-Boigny – who had recognised Biafra on 14 May 1968 – granted him political asylum.

Ojukwu bunker at the National War Museum

=== War Cabinet ===
The Ojukwu War Cabinet was the central leadership group that governed the Republic of Biafra during the Nigerian Civil War (1967–1970), led by Chukwuemeka Odumegwu Ojukwu. It included top military officers like Maj. Gen. Philip Effiong and Brig. Alexander Madiebo, key administrators such as N. U. Akpan, legal adviser Sir Louis Mbanefo, economic and scientific experts like Dr. Pius Okigbo and Prof. Kenneth Dike, and diplomats including R. B. K. Okafor and Dr. Akanu Ibiam. Together, they managed Biafra’s war strategy, diplomacy, relief efforts, economy, propaganda, and day-to-day governance under extreme wartime pressure. It was succeeded by the Effiong Caretaker Government, after Chukwuemeka Odumegwu Ojukwu fled to Ivory Coast.

Members:

- President: General Chukwuemeka Odumegwu Ojukwu
- Vice President and Chief of General Staff: Major-General Philip Effiong – Second-in-command and later acting President in January 1970.
- Chief Secretary to the Government: N.U. Akpan – senior administrative official.
- GOC (Biafran Army): Major-General Alexander Madiebo (succeeded Brigadier Hilary Njoku as army commander).
- Commander of the Biafran Air Force: Wing Commander G. I. Ezeilo
- Commander of the Biafran Navy: Captain W. A. Anuku
- Director of Military Intelligence: Bernard Odogwu
- Principal Officer to the C-in-C: Colonel Patrick Anwuna
- Military Assistant to the Commander-in-Chief: Colonel David Ogunewe
- Inspector-General of Police: P. I. Okeke
- Chief Justice: Sir Louis Mbanefo
- Attorney-General & Commissioner for Justice: J. I. Emembolu
- Special Advisers to the Head of State: Dr. Akanu Ibiam and Dr. M. I. Okpara

== Return to Nigeria ==
In 1981, Ojukwu began campaigning to return to Nigeria. Nigerian president Shehu Aliyu Usman Shagari granted a pardon to Ojukwu on 18 May 1982, allowing him to return to Nigeria as a private citizen. Ojukwu re-entered Nigeria from Ivory Coast on 18 June. Ojukwu declared his candidacy for the Nigerian Senate in 1983. The official tally showed him losing by 12,000 votes, though a court attempted to reverse the ruling in September of that year, citing fraud in the election results. However, the disputed result was rendered moot when the Shagari government fell in the 1983 Nigerian coup d'état on 31 December. In early 1984, the Buhari regime jailed hundreds of political figures, including Ojukwu, who was held at the Kirikiri Maximum Security Prison. He was released later that year.

Ojukwu married Bianca Onoh (former Miss Intercontinental and future ambassador) in 1994, his third marriage. The couple had three children, Afamefuna, Chineme and Nwachukwu. In the Fourth Republic era, Ojukwu unsuccessfully contested the presidency in 2003 and 2007.

== Death ==
On 26 November 2011, Chukwuemeka Odumegwu Ojukwu died in the United Kingdom after a brief illness, aged 78. The Nigerian Army accorded him the highest military accolade and conducted a funeral parade for him in Abuja, Nigeria on 27 February 2012, the day his body was flown back to Nigeria from London before his burial on Friday 2 March. He was buried in a newly built mausoleum in his compound at Nnewi. Before his final interment, he had an elaborate weeklong funeral ceremony in Nigeria, wherein his body was carried around the five Eastern states, Imo, Abia, Enugu, Ebonyi, Anambra, and the nation's capital, Abuja. Memorial services and public events were also held in his honour in several places across Nigeria, including Lagos and Niger State, his birthplace, and as far away as Dallas, Texas, United States.

His funeral was attended by Goodluck Jonathan, the former president of Nigeria, and ex-President Jerry Rawlings of Ghana among other personalities.

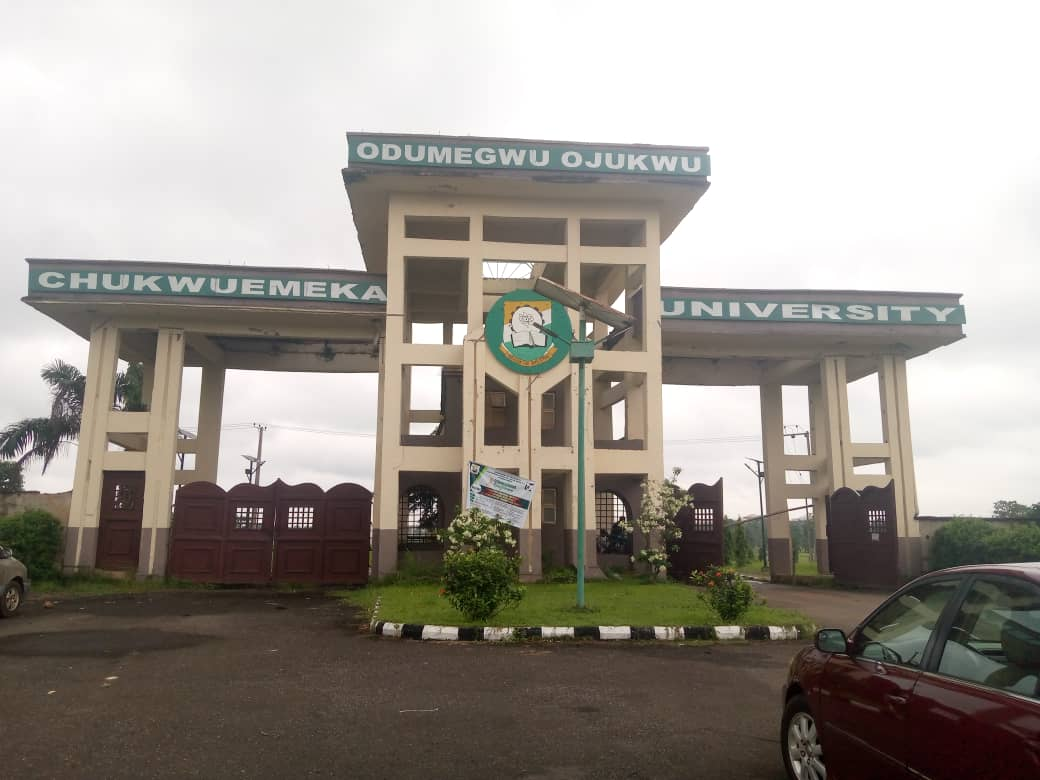
Anambra State University founded in 2000 was renamed in 2014 by the then governor of Anambra State Peter Obi to Chukwuemeka Odumegwu Ojukwu University to honor Ojukwu

== Sources ==
- Forsyth, Frederick (1982). Emeka. Ibadan, Nigeria: Spectrum Books. ISBN 978-978-2265-52-4. OCLC 690898672.
- Nwakanma, Obi (3 December 2011). "Chukwuemeka Odumegwu-Ojukwu (1933-2011)". Vanguard News.
- Elusoji, Solomon (14 January 2020). "Timeline: Biafra War In Key Dates". Channels Television.
