= Biafran Armed Forces =

Military of the former Nigerian secessionist state

- Motto: The People's Army
- Founded: 1967
- Disbanded: 1970
- Service branches: Biafran Army; Biafran Navy Biafran Air Force
- Headquarters: Enugu

Leadership
- Commander-in-Chief: Odumegwu Ojukwu
- Chief of General Staff: Philip Effiong

Personnel
- Active personnel: 100,000
- Reserve personnel: 50,000

Industry
- Domestic suppliers: Biafra Research and Production (RAP)
- Foreign suppliers: Israel; France; China; Portugal

Related articles
- History: Nigerian Civil War
- Ranks: Military ranks of Biafra

The Biafran Armed Forces (BAF) were the military and armed forces of the Republic of Biafra, which existed from 1967 until 1970.

== History ==
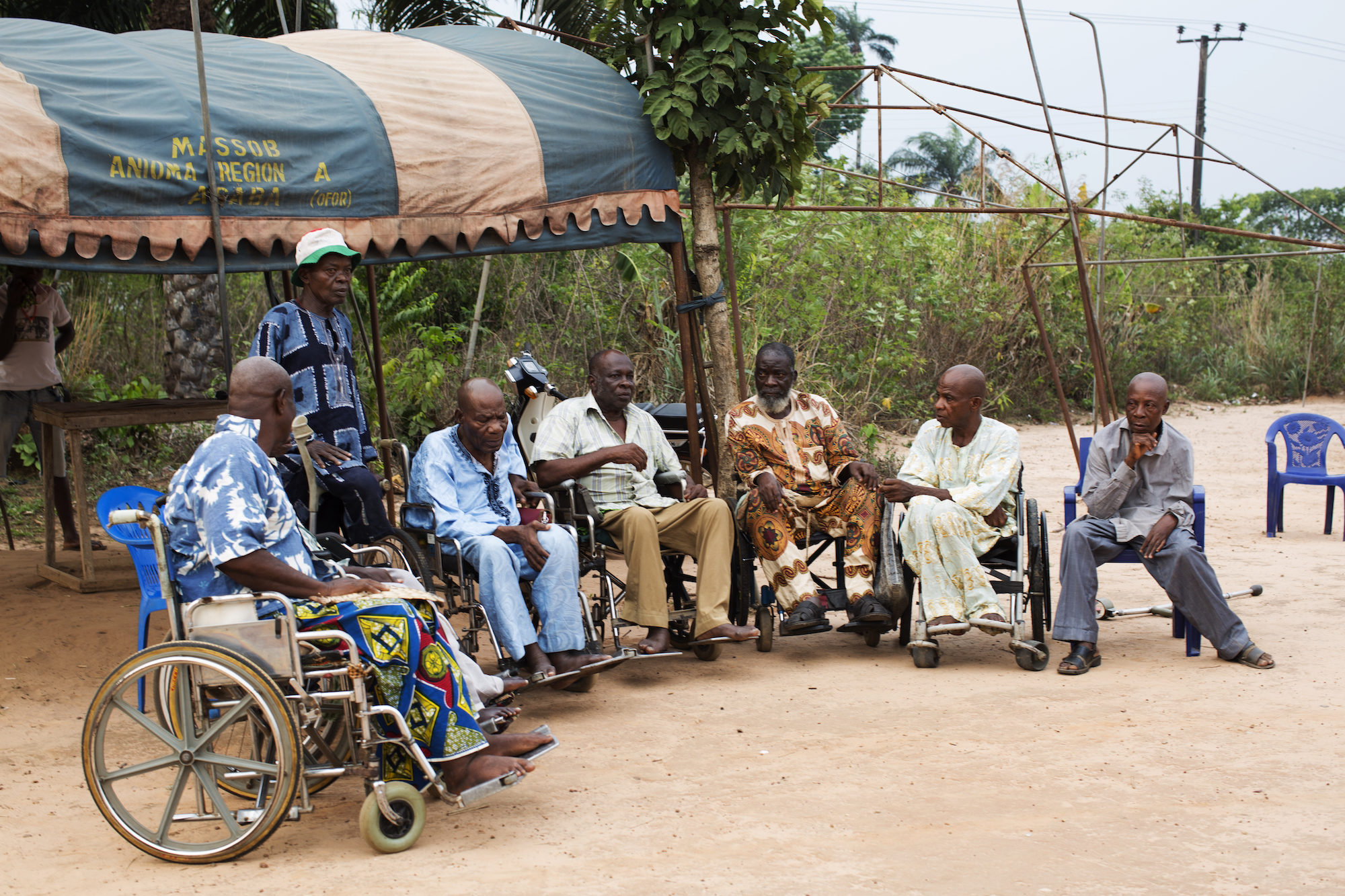
Disabled Biafran war veterans in 2017.

At the beginning of the Nigerian Civil War, Biafra had 3,000 soldiers. This number grew as the war progressed, ultimately reaching 30,000. No official support for the Biafran Army came from any other nation, although arms were clandestinely acquired.

Some Europeans served the Biafran cause: German-born Rolf Steiner was a lieutenant colonel assigned to the 4th Commando Brigade, and Welshman Taffy Williams served as a major throughout the conflict. A special guerrilla unit, the Biafran Organization of Freedom Fighters, was established: designed to emulate the Viet Cong, they targeted Nigerian supply lines, forcing them to shift resources to internal security efforts.

=== Legacy ===
In course of the insurgency in Southeastern Nigeria of 2021, a separatist group known as "Biafran National Guard" (BNG) organized the "Biafran Supreme Military Council of Administration". The latter posed as high command of the restored Biafran Armed Forces, including the "Biafran Army, Biafran Navy, Biafran Air-Force and Biafran Detective Force".

== Branches ==
=== Army ===
At the peak of Biafran military power, the Biafran Army was made of 5 divisions; numbered 11th, 12th, 13th (later renumbered 15th), 14th and 101st. It also had 2 separate brigades, the S Brigade, a Pretorian guard for General Ojukwu, and the 4th Commando Brigade (trained and commanded by mercenaries). It was commanded by Brigadier Hillary Njoku and later Major General Alexander Madiebo.

=== Air Force ===
Roundel of the Biafran Air Force

The Biafrans set up a small, yet effective air force. Biafran Air Force commanders were Chude Sokey and later Godwin Ezeilo Ezeilo, who had trained with the Royal Canadian Air Force. Its early inventory included two B-25 Mitchells, two B-26 Invaders, (one piloted by Polish World War II ace Jan Zumbach, known also as John Brown), a converted DC-3 and one Dove. In 1968, Swedish pilot Carl Gustaf von Rosen suggested the MiniCOIN project to General Ojukwu.

By early 1969, Biafra had assembled five MFI-9Bs in Gabon, calling them "Biafra Babies". They were coloured green, were able to carry six 68 mm anti-armour rockets under each wing using simple sights. The five planes were flown by three Swedish pilots and three Biafran pilots. In September 1969, Biafra acquired four ex-Armee de l'Air North American T-6Gs, which were flown to Biafra the following month, with another T-6 lost on the ferry flight. These aircraft flew missions until January 1970 manned by Portuguese ex-military pilots.

During the war, Biafra tried to acquire jets. Two Fouga Magisters and several Gloster Meteors were bought but never arrived in Biafra, being abandoned on foreign African airbases.

Aircraft	Origin	Number	Notes
MFI-9B "Biafra Babies"	Sweden	5	
Douglas B-26 Invader	USA	2	Provided by Pierre Laureys
North American B-25 Mitchell	USA	2	
de Havilland Dove	UK	2	
Fokker F27 Friendship	Netherlands	1	Ex-Nigerian Airways, used as an improvised bomber
Douglas DC-3	USA	1	Improvised bomber
North American T-6 Texan	USA	4-6	Ex-Armee de l'Air

=== Navy ===
Biafra had a small improvised navy, but it never gained the success of the air force. It was headquartered in Kidney Island, Port Harcourt, and was commanded by Winifred Anuku. The Biafran Navy was made up of captured craft, converted tugs, and armored civilian vessels armed with machine guns, or captured 6-pounder guns. It mainly operated in the Niger Delta and along the Niger River.

Ships in service
Ship	Origin	commissioned	Fate	notes
BNS Vigilance	ex-NNS Ibadan	30 May 1967	Sunk on 10 September 1967	Ford-class seaward defence boat
BNS Bonny	ex-HMS Gifford	1968	Captured from Nigeria navy in 1968 .Preserved at the National Nigerian War Museum	Ford-class seaward defence boat
BNS Ikwerre	ex-Nigerian port authority tugboat	1967		Armed with a 105mm howitzer
PC101	ex-Nigerian port authority cutter	1968	Lost in July 1968	Armed with 6-pounder and Bofors gun
PC202	Nigerian tugboat	1968	Lost in July 1968	Armed with a 105mm howitzer
PC203	Nigerian tugboat	1968	Sunk in September 1968	
PC204	Nigerian civilian craft	1969		

=== Biafran Military Intelligence ===
The Biafran Military Intelligence Wing was the intelligence arm of the Biafran Armed Forces during the Nigerian Civil War (1967–1970). It reported directly to the General Headquarters (GHQ) under the authority of President Chukwuemeka Odumegwu Ojukwu and focused on gathering battlefield, strategic, and political information to support the war effort. Despite severe shortages, the intelligence wing relied heavily on human intelligence (HUMINT)—scouts, villagers, informants, and refugee reports—because modern technology was limited. It also conducted radio interception, counter-intelligence to prevent enemy infiltration, and reconnaissance patrols to track Nigerian troop movements. The wing used a network of field agents, militia observers, and civil defense units to collect data, making it highly adaptive and community-based. Although technically limited, it proved effective in local reconnaissance, early warnings, and internal security, helping Biafra survive far longer than expected under siege conditions.

=== Biafran General Headquarters (GHQ) ===
The Biafran General Headquarters (GHQ) was the central command structure of the Biafran Armed Forces during the Nigerian Civil War (1967–1970). It served as the brain of the military, directing strategy, operations, logistics, intelligence, and communication across all fronts. GHQ operated under the authority of Chukwuemeka Odumegwu Ojukwu, the Head of State and Commander-in-Chief, with Maj. Gen. Philip Effiong and Brig. Alexander Madiebo playing major roles in coordinating army activities. GHQ issued orders to field divisions, evaluated intelligence reports, planned major offensives and defensive operations, and managed supplies under extreme shortages caused by the Nigerian blockade. It also supervised units like the Directorate of Military Intelligence, Artillery Command, Logistics & Transport, and Signals Corps. Despite its limited resources, the Biafran GHQ maintained effective coordination through improvisation, strong discipline, and a centralized command style—allowing Biafra to sustain organized resistance for nearly three years.

== Weapons and equipment used by Army and militias ==
Rocket launchers
Type	Origin	notes
Pancerovka P-27	Czech-made	
Type 56 RPG	Chinese-made	
SARPAC	French-made	Some from 1968
Ogbunigwe Launcher	Biafra Research and Production	

Mortars
Type	Origin	notes
2-in mortar	ex-Nigerian Army	
Ordnance ML 3 inch mortar	ex-Nigerian Army	
L-N 81mm mortar	Spanish-made	At least 6
MO-120 AM-50	French-made	

Guns
Type	Origin	notes
Canon de 75 modèle 1897		Never used in combat (unable to fire)
Oerlikon 20 mm cannon	Hispano-Suiza (Spain)	
M18/49 105mm howitzer (upgraded 10.5 cm leFH 18/40)	Czech-made	
Ordnance QF 6-pounder	ex-Nigerian Army	
Bofors 40 mm gun	ex-Nigerian Army	
OTO Melara Mod 56	ex-Nigerian Army	

Armoured vehicles
Type	Origin	Number	notes
AML-60	ex-Nigerian Army	At least 1	
AML-90	ex-Nigerian Army	At least 1	
Ferret armoured car	ex-Nigerian Army	At least 1	
Alvis Saladin	ex-Nigerian Army	At least 2	
Alvis Saracen	ex-Nigerian Army	1	
Universal Carrier	French trader	A small number 5-6	
Red Devils	Biafra	4	Many designs
Armoured Scorpion Bazooka	Biafra	1	Only one design made
Biafra Armoured Car	Biafra	1	Only one design made

== Commander-In-Chief ==
The Commander-in-Chief of the Biafran Armed Forces was responsible for leading the military during the Nigerian Civil War, overseeing operations and strategy. Chukwuemeka Odumegwu Ojukwu held this position from the establishment of Biafra in 1967 until its surrender in 1970. He was a key figure in the secessionist state of Biafra.

No.	Portrait	Name (lifespan)	Term of office			Political party	Notes
No.	Portrait	Name (lifespan)	Took office	Left office	Time in office	Political party	Notes
1		C. Odumegwu Ojukwu (1933–2011)	30 May 1967	8 January 1970	2 years, 223 days	Military	Became President on 30 May 1967 and he later fled to Ivory Coast on 8 January 1970 near the Nigerian Civil War.
2		Philip Effiong (1925–2003)	8 January 1970	15 January 1970	7 days	Military	Became President after C. Odumegwu Ojukwu fled to the to Ivory Coast. Later surrendered Biafra to Nigeria on the 15 January 1970.

== Chief of General Staff ==
The Chief of General Staff of the Biafran Armed Forces was responsible for overseeing military operations and strategy during the Nigerian Civil War. Vice President Philip Effiong held this position, coordinating the activities of the Biafran Army, Navy, and Air Force. He later became the acting president of Biafra after Ojukwu's fled to the Ivory Coast.

No.	Portrait	Name (lifespan)	Term of office			Political party	Notes
No.	Portrait	Name (lifespan)	Took office	Left office	Time in office	Political party	Notes
1		Philip Effiong (1925–2003)	30 May 1967	8 January 1970	2 years, 223 days	Military	Became President after C. Odumegwu Ojukwu fled to the to Ivory Coast. Later surrendered Biafra to Nigeria on the 15 January 1970.
2		Office Vacant	8 January 1970	15 January 1970	7 days	Military	Office vacant after Philip Effiong became president on 8 January 1970. Office later abolished on 15 January 1970.

== GOC of the Biafran Armed Forcee ==
The effective General Officer Commanding (GOC) of the Biafran Armed Forces during the Nigerian Civil War was Brigadier (later Major General) Alexander Madiebo. As Commander of the Biafran Army, he directed all frontline operations, issued orders to divisions and brigades, coordinated troop movements, and oversaw training and mobilization. He operated under the supreme authority of Chukwuemeka Odumegwu Ojukwu, the Commander-in-Chief, and worked closely with Maj. Gen. Philip Effiong, the Chief of General Staff. Together, this trio formed the core of Biafra’s wartime military leadership.

== See also ==
- Mercenaries in Biafra
- Biafra Liberation Army

== Bibliography ==
- Daly, Samuel Fury Childs. A History of the Republic of Biafra: Law, Crime, and the Nigerian Civil War, (Cambridge University Press, 2020) online review
- Jowett, Philip (2016). Modern African Wars (5): The Nigerian-Biafran War 1967-70. Oxford: Osprey Publishing Press. ISBN 978-1472816092.
- Odu, P.J. (2009). The Future That Vanished: A Biafra Story. Xlibris (self-published). ISBN 9781441539724.
- Vidal, João M. (September–October 1996). "Texans in Biafra: T-6Gs in Use in the Nigerian Civil War". Air Enthusiast (65): 40–47. ISSN 0143-5450.
- Venter, Al J. (2015). Biafra's War 1967-1970: A Tribal Conflict in Nigeria That Left a Million Dead. Helion & Company. ISBN 978-1-910294-69-7.
