= Biafran Research and Production =

Research institution during the Nigerian Civil War

Biafran Research and Production or Research and Production (RAP) was a scientific and engineering research institution of the Republic of Biafra that researched and manufactured military technology for the Biafran Armed Forces during the Nigerian Civil War.

RAP was founded in April 1967 by Biafran scientists at the University of Biafra (now University of Nigeria) to independently manufacture weapons and technology that were difficult for the Biafran military to acquire from abroad due to the Nigerian blockade of Biafra. Technologies produced by chemists included incendiaries, smoke signals, detonators, napalm, primers, rocket fuels, cocktails, and bombs. Engineering groups produced grenade and rocket casings, mortar shells, bullets, and armored vehicles. One of the best known weapons was Ogbunigwe, a family of highly effective explosive devices that killed thousands of Nigerian soldiers in a single blast. Scientists at RAP additionally experimented with the development of chemical and biological weapons.

RAP allowed Biafra to unexpectedly fight an extended war against the Soviet and British-backed Nigerian military, while Biafra received comparatively little international military aid.

The weapons and vehicles produced by RAP are on display at the National War Museum, Umuahia.
