= Philip Effiong =

Nigerian military officer, vice-president and president of Biafra (1925–2003)

Philip Efiong

2nd President of Biafra
- Acting; 8 January 1970 – 15 January 1970
- Vice President: Office Vacant
- Preceded by: Chukwuemeka Odumegwu Ojukwu
- Succeeded by: Office Abolished

Chief of General Staff
- In office 30 May 1967 - 8 January 1970
- President: Chukwuemeka Odumegwu Ojukwu
- Preceded by: Position Created
- Succeeded by: Position Vacant (Office Abolished on 15 January 1970)

Vice-President of Biafra
- In office 30 May 1967 – 8 January 1970
- President: Chukwuemeka Odumegwu Ojukwu
- Preceded by: Position created
- Succeeded by: Office Vacant (Office Abolished on 15 January 1970)

Personal details
- Born: Oblong Philip Efiong; 18 November 1925 Ibiono Ibom, British Nigeria
- Died: 6 November 2003 (aged 77) Aba, Abia State, Nigeria
- Spouse: Josephine Efiong
- Children: Roseline Efiong, Mercy Ugot, Valentine Efiong, Charles Efiong, Philip Efiong II, Francis Efiong, Philippa Umeh, Elizabeth Edem,
- Profession: Military officer and politician

Philip Efiong (also spelled Effiong, 18 November 1925 – 6 November 2003) was a Nigerian military officer who, during the Nigerian Civil War (1967–70), was the first vice-president and, briefly, the second and last president of the Republic of Biafra.

== Early life ==
Born in Ibiono Ibom in present-day Akwa Ibom State, Nigeria, on 18 November 1925, Philip Effiong joined the Nigerian Armed Forces on 28 July 1945. The UK later commissioned him for duty in the Rhine, West Germany. He was then transferred to the Nigeria Army Ordnance Corps; then to England for further training after a peace-keeping stint in the Republic of Congo in 1961. He was Nigeria's first Director of Ordnance.

== Biafra and vice-presidency ==
Efiong became Chief of General Staff of Biafra under President Odumegwu Ojukwu during the Nigeria-Biafra war, and vice-president.

The tactics of the Nigerian military during the war included economic blockade and deliberate destruction of agricultural land. Even before the war, the area was a net importer of food, depending on income from its oil fields to feed its populace.

With the blockade cutting off oil revenue and agricultural destruction reducing food production, the result was mass dislocation and starvation of the populace. Two to three million people are thought to have died in the conflict, mostly through starvation and illness.

When Biafra's military resistance collapsed, Ojukwu fled to Côte d'Ivoire.

== Effiong as acting president ==
Efiong assumed leadership in this situation of turmoil, starvation, and collapse. He became acting Head of State of Biafra on 8 January 1970 and on 12 January announced surrender.

=== Caretaker Government ===
Effiong Caretaker Government of January 1970, which existed for six days, from January 8 to January 15 was formed after President C. Odumegwu Ojukwu fled to the Ivory Coast. It did not form an official cabinet but did operate with a very small circle of senior officials. These senior officials helped acting President Philip Efiong oversee the surrender of Biafra to Nigeria.

==== Members ====
- Major General Philip Effiong – Head of State
- Sir Louis Mbanefo – Chief Justice of Biafra
- Colonel Ignatius Koguna – Head of Biafran Police
- Colonel S. O. O. Odogwu – Senior Army Staff Officer
- Dr. E. Iwuchukwu – Senior Civil Service Secretary
- Brigadier Patrick Anwunah – Senior military/intelligence staff officer

== Effiong's speech to Gowon ==
On 15 January 1970 at Dodan Barracks in Lagos, in the presence of General Yakubu Gowon, Effiong announced the end of the Biafran conflict.

"I, Major-General Phillip Efiong, Officer Administering the Government of the Republic of Biafra, now wish to make the following declaration:

That we affirm that we are loyal Nigerian citizens and accept the authority of the Federal Military Government of Nigeria. That we accept the existing administrative and political structure of the Federation of Nigeria. That any future constitutional arrangement will be worked out by representatives of the people of Nigeria.

That the Republic of Biafra hereby ceases to exist."

At the time of the surrender, Effiong believed that the situation was hopeless and that prolonging the conflict would have led only to the further destruction and starvation of the people of Biafra. At that time Effiong said, "I am convinced now that a stop must be put to the bloodshed which is going on as a result of the war. I am also convinced that the suffering of our people must be brought to an immediate end."

Nnaemeka L. Aneke wrote, "General Efiong’s handling of Biafra’s surrender is one of the most tactical and devoted maneuvers ever seen on the Nigerian scene. Those who do not appreciate the depth of it may not have appreciated what was at stake as Biafra capitulated." Many observers had expected wholesale retribution at war's end.

== Later life and death ==
In a 1996 interview, Effiong reflected on his role in Biafra:

I have no regrets whatsoever of my involvement in Biafra or the role I played. The war deprived me of my property, dignity, my name. Yet, I saved so many souls on both sides and by this, I mean Biafra and Nigeria…
I felt that I played a role which has kept this country united till today…
At the end of it all when I saw they (Biafran soldiers) could no longer continue and Ojukwu had fled, I did what was ideal after wide consultation…

Efiong died on 6 November 2003, at the age of 77.

== See also ==
- Biafra
- Igbo people
