= Mbanefo =

- Gender: Male
- Language: Igbo

Origin
- Origin: Igbo
- Meaning: May the nation/community remember
- Region of origin: Igboland

Mbanefo audio is a masculine Igbo name. The name means "may the nation/community remember". It is usually a family name.

== Notable people with the name ==
- Louis Mbanefo, Nigerian lawyer and politician
- Arthur Mbanefo, Nigerian accountant and diplomat
