= SARPAC =

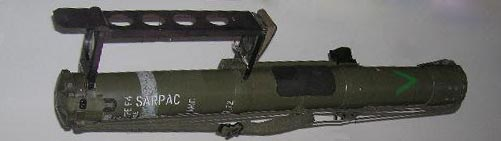
- Type: Single-shot disposable rocket launcher
- Place of origin: France

Service history
- Used by: See § Users
- Wars: Nigerian Civil War

Production history
- Designer: Hotchkiss-Brandt
- Designed: 1970s
- Manufacturer: Hotchkiss-Brandt
- Produced: 1970s

Specifications
- Mass: Empty launcher: 1.9 kg (4.19 lb)
- Length: Closed for transport: 734 mm (28.90 in); Extended for firing: 997 mm (39.25 in)
- Crew: 1
- Cartridge: See § Ammunition
- Cartridge weight: HEAT round: 1.09 kg (2.40 lb)
- Caliber: 68 mm (2.68 in)
- Action: Semi-disposable (Note: Improved launcher can be reused 20 times)
- Muzzle velocity: HEAT: 150 m/s (490 ft/s)
- Effective firing range: 150-200 m antitank round
- Maximum firing range: 700-800 m general purpose and illumination round
- Sights: Mechanical, trapezoidal flip up sights

SARPAC (French: Super Arme de Proximité Anti-Char) is a French made recoilless individual 68 millimetres (2.7 in) diameter anti-tank and assault rocket weapon.

== History ==
The Sarpac was developed by the company Hotchkiss-Brandt (1956-1966), and was designed mostly as an anti-tank weapon, but it is also useful against fortified positions built of concrete. The Sarpac comprises a launcher that can fire 68mm high-explosive anti-tank (HEAT) dual-purpose anti-personnel weapon or illuminating rocket projectiles. Sarpac is one of the few light anti-tank rocket launchers made in the 1960s and 1970s that offered both a high penetration anti-tank round and a general purpose round, which has a smaller HEAT warhead than the anti-tank round, and has two metal fragmentation collars located around the body of the warhead, and while its penetration of 300 millimetres (12 in) is ineffective against heavily armoured main battle tanks, it is enough to be effective against light armour, vehicles, and personnel and is considered superior for almost all combat firing missions other than anti-tank and concrete bunkers. Due to the size and weight of general purpose round, there is almost double the effective range of the anti-tank round. (Note: most likely the reason that Malaysia's government bought the Sarpac for their paramilitary forces is they had no need for an anti-tank weapon) The launcher consists of two telescoping tube sections with the inner one extending forward, a trigger mechanism, a sighting unit, a folding shoulder support and a strap for carrying. The sighting mechanism while considered unusual, is robust and has the shape of a parallelogram when in firing position. On the front of the sight there is both a ranging scale and a grid which enables the operator to fire at moving targets. The projectile is fin stabilized with eight forward folding fins which lock into position after leaving the tube. The rocket motor burns fully before leaving the tube, to avoid injuring the gunner. The Sarpac launcher weighs approximately 1.9 kg (4.2 lb) empty and was originally meant to be disposable, however tests showed that the improved launcher introduced later could be reused for up to 20 firings. Though developed and manufactured in France, the Sarpac was never adopted by the French Army. Instead, it was exported to several countries. (Note: only two have been named, although it is reported to be sold to other nations in Africa and the Middle East) The unit cost of the projectile and launcher is reported to be very low.

The Sarpac is no longer produced, is considered obsolete, and no longer in service within most countries.

== ARPAC ==
In the early 1970s, a derivative weapon named ARPAC (Arme de Proximité Anti-Char) was present. Allowing to shoot up to 80 meters, weighing less than a kilo, made of plastic, measuring 40 cm in transport order and piercing 300 mm of armor, it does not seem to have been mass produced nor even having had any customers.

== Ammunition ==
- ROCHAR HEAT – HEAT round, effective range 200 meters, weight 1.09 kg
- ROCHAP HEAP – dual purpose round with both an anti-personnel and light anti-armour warhead, effective range 700 meters, weight 1.8 kg
- ROCLAIR ILLUM – illumination round, range 765 meters (fired at a slant into the air), weight 1.3 kg, burn time 30 seconds

== Users ==
External image
- Brandt SARPAC
- SARPAC top, M72 LAW middle, MINIMAN bottom

=== Non-state users ===
- Biafra

=== State users ===
- Finland
- Malaysia - In use by the Royal Malaysia Police.
