= List of presidents of Biafra =

List of Heads of State

President of the Republic of Biafra
- Flag of Biafra
- Style: His/Her Excellency
- Member of: Cabinet
- Residence: State House
- Seat: Enugu Umuahia Owerri
- Precursor: Governor of Eastern Region, Nigeria
- Formation: 30 May 1967
- First holder: Odumegwu Ojukwu
- Final holder: Philip Effiong
- Abolished: 15 January 1970
- Deputy: Vice President of Biafra

The president of Biafra was the head of state of the Republic of Biafra, a secessionist state that consisted of the old Eastern Region of Nigeria.

== List of presidents ==
| No. | Portrait | Name (lifespan) | Term of office | | | Political party | Government | Notes | Ref. |
| No. | Portrait | Name (lifespan) | Took office | Left office | Time in office | Political party | Government | Notes | Ref. |
|---|---|---|---|---|---|---|---|---|---|
| 1 | | C. Odumegwu Ojukwu (1933–2011) | 30 May 1967 | 8 January 1970 | 2 years, 223 days | Military | Ojukwu War Cabinet | Fled to Ivory Coast at the end of the Nigerian Civil War. | |
| 2 | | Philip Effiong (1925–2003) | 8 January 1970 | 15 January 1970 | 7 days | Military | Effiong Caretaker Government | Surrendered Biafra to Nigeria. | |

== Vice President ==
The Vice President of Biafra, Philip Efiong served under President Chukwuemeka Odumegwu Ojukwu during the Nigerian Civil War. He played a crucial role in the Biafran government and later became the acting Head of State when Ojukwu left the country, ultimately announcing Biafra's surrender in January 1970.

| No. | Portrait | Name (lifespan) | Term of office | | | Political party | Notes |
| No. | Portrait | Name (lifespan) | Took office | Left office | Time in office | Political party | Notes |
|---|---|---|---|---|---|---|---|
| 1 | | Philip Efiong (1925–2003) | 30 May 1967 | 8 January 1970 | 2 years, 223 days | Military | Became President after C. Odumegwu Ojukwu fled to the to Ivory Coast. Later surrendered Biafra to Nigeria on the 15 January 1970. |
| 2 | | Office Vacant | 8 January 1970 | 15 January 1970 | 7 days | Independent | Office vacant after President C. Odumegwu Ojukwu fled to the Ivory Coast and Vice President Philip Effiong became President. Office later abolished from 15 January 1970. |

== Cabinet ==
The Biafra Cabinet was part of the government of the Republic of Biafra, the Ojukwu War Cabinet existed from 1967 to 1970 during the Nigerian Civil War. It was led by President Chukwuemeka Odumegwu Ojukwu and included various ministers responsible for different government functions, reflecting an attempt to establish a functioning state during its brief existence.

== Biafran Armed Forces ==
The President served as the Commander-in-Chief of the Biafran Armed Forces and was responsible for leading the military operations during the Nigerian Civil War and overseeing the overall strategy and organization of the armed forces. This position was held by Chukwuemeka Odumegwu Ojukwu who declared the independence of Biafra and led its forces from 1967 until 8 January 1970 and was succeeded by Philip Effiong, who led the country in the final days of the war.

== See also ==
- History of Nigeria
- Nigerian Civil War
