= Alexander Madiebo =

Nigerian soldier (1932–2022)

Alexander Attah Madiebo
- Born: Alexander Attah Madiebo; 29 April 1932; Umuokpu, Awka, Nigeria
- Died: 3 June 2022 (aged 90); Lagos, Nigeria
- Education: Government College Umuahia
- Spouse: Regina Ifeyinwa Madiebo (m. 1961; died 2022)
- Military career
- Allegiance: Nigeria; Biafra
- Service: Nigerian Army (1954–1966); Biafran Armed Forces (1967–1970)
- Service years: 1954–1970
- Rank: General
- Commands: General Officer Commanding GOC of the Biafran Armed Forces
- Battles: Congo Crisis; Nigerian Civil War
- Other work: The Nigerian Revolution and the Biafran war... The aftermath (2022)

Alexander A. Madiebo (29 April 1932 – 3 June 2022) was a Biafran soldier. He served as the General Officer Commanding (GOC) of the Republic of Biafra which existed from 1967 to 1970.

== Life and career ==
Madiebo joined the military in 1954, during the colonial era, after graduating from Government College, Umuahia. In 1960, he was deployed to Congo, during the Congo Crisis as a peacekeeping force for United Nations Operation in the Congo. In 1964, he was made the first indigenous commander of the Artillery Regiment. He fled from the northern region during the 1966 anti-Igbo pogrom. He was the General Officer Commanding of the Republic of Biafra during the Nigerian Civil War. He joined Ojukwu to flee to Ivory Coast. He died on 3 June 2022 at the age of 90.
