= 1945 Jos riots =

Series of ethnic conflicts

- Location: Jos, Nigeria
- Date: 1945
- Target: Igbos and Hausa-Fulani
- Attack type: Riot
- Deaths: At least two people killed
- Injuries: unspecified number

The 1945 Jos riots were a series of ethnic conflicts which occurred in the city of Jos, located in Plateau State, Nigeria, between ethnic Igbos and Hausa-Fulani.

The 1945 Jos riots were fueled by a combination of factors, including competition for political power, economic resources, and disputes over land and religious differences. The conflicts have mainly been between the predominantly Muslim Hausa-Fulani ethnic group and the predominantly Christian Igbo ethnic group, although other groups have also been involved.

== Misconceptions ==
Contrary to popular beliefs the 1945 Jos riots was a potato market riot, and not a massacre or religious war. Though the death toll is unknown, multiple reports put the figure of not more than two people dying.
