= Biafra =

1967–1970 partially recognised state in Africa

Republic of Biafra
- 1967–1970
- Flag Coat of arms
- Motto: "Peace, Unity, and Freedom"
- Anthem: "Land of the Rising Sun"
- The Republic of Biafra in red, with its puppet state of the Republic of Benin in striped red, and Nigeria in dark gray.

- Republic of Biafra in May 1967
- Status: Partially recognised state
- Capital: Enugu (1967); Umuahia (1967–1969); Owerri (1969–1970); Awka (1970); 6°27′N 7°30′E
- Largest city: Onitsha
- Common languages: Predominantly: Igbo; English; Minority languages: Ibibio; Ijaw; Efik; Ejagham; Ogoni
- Ethnic groups: Igbo (70%); Efik; Ibibio; Ogoni; Ijaw
- Demonym: Biafran
- Government: Unitary presidential republic
- President
  - 1967–1970: Chukwuemeka Odumegwu Ojukwu
  - 1970: Philip Effiong
- Vice President
  - 1967–1970: Philip Effiong
  - 1970: Office Vacant
  - Upper house: Council of Chiefs
  - Lower house: Consultative Assembly
- Historical era: Cold War (Sino-Soviet split)
  - Independence declared: 30 May 1967
  - Rejoins Federal Nigeria: 15 January 1970

Area
- 1967: 77,306 km^{2} (29,848 sq mi)

Population
  - 1967: 13,500,000
- GDP (PPP): estimate
  - Total: $40.750 million
- Currency: Biafran pound
Preceded by	Succeeded by
Eastern Region	Nigeria

Biafra (/biˈæfrə/ bee-AF-rə; Igbo: Bịafra), officially the Republic of Biafra (Igbo: Ripọblik du Bịafra), was a partially recognised state in West Africa that declared independence from Nigeria and existed from 1967 to 1970. Its territory consisted of the former Eastern Region of Nigeria, predominantly inhabited by the Igbo ethnic group, but with sizable chunks of the region belonging to the Ijaw, Efik, Ibibio and other tribes. Biafra was established on 30 May 1967 by Igbo military officer and Eastern Region governor Chukwuemeka Odumegwu Ojukwu under his presidency, following a series of ethnic tensions and military coups after Nigerian independence in 1960 that culminated in the 1966 anti-Igbo pogrom.

The Nigerian military attempted to reclaim the territory of Biafra, resulting in the beginning of the Nigerian Civil War. Biafra was officially recognized as a sovereign and independent country by Gabon, Haiti, Côte d'Ivoire, Tanzania, and Zambia while receiving de facto recognition and covert military support from France, Portugal, Israel, South Africa, and Rhodesia. After nearly three years of war, during which around two million Biafran civilians died, President Ojukwu fled into exile in the Ivory Coast as the Nigerian military approached the capital of Biafra. Philip Effiong became the second president of Biafra, overseeing the surrender of Biafran forces to Nigeria.

Igbo nationalism became a strong political and social force after the civil war. It has grown more militant since the 1990s, calling for the independence of the Biafran people and the establishment of their state. Various Biafran secessionist groups have emerged, such as the Indigenous People of Biafra, the Movement for the Actualization of the Sovereign State of Biafra, and the Biafra Zionist Front.

== History ==
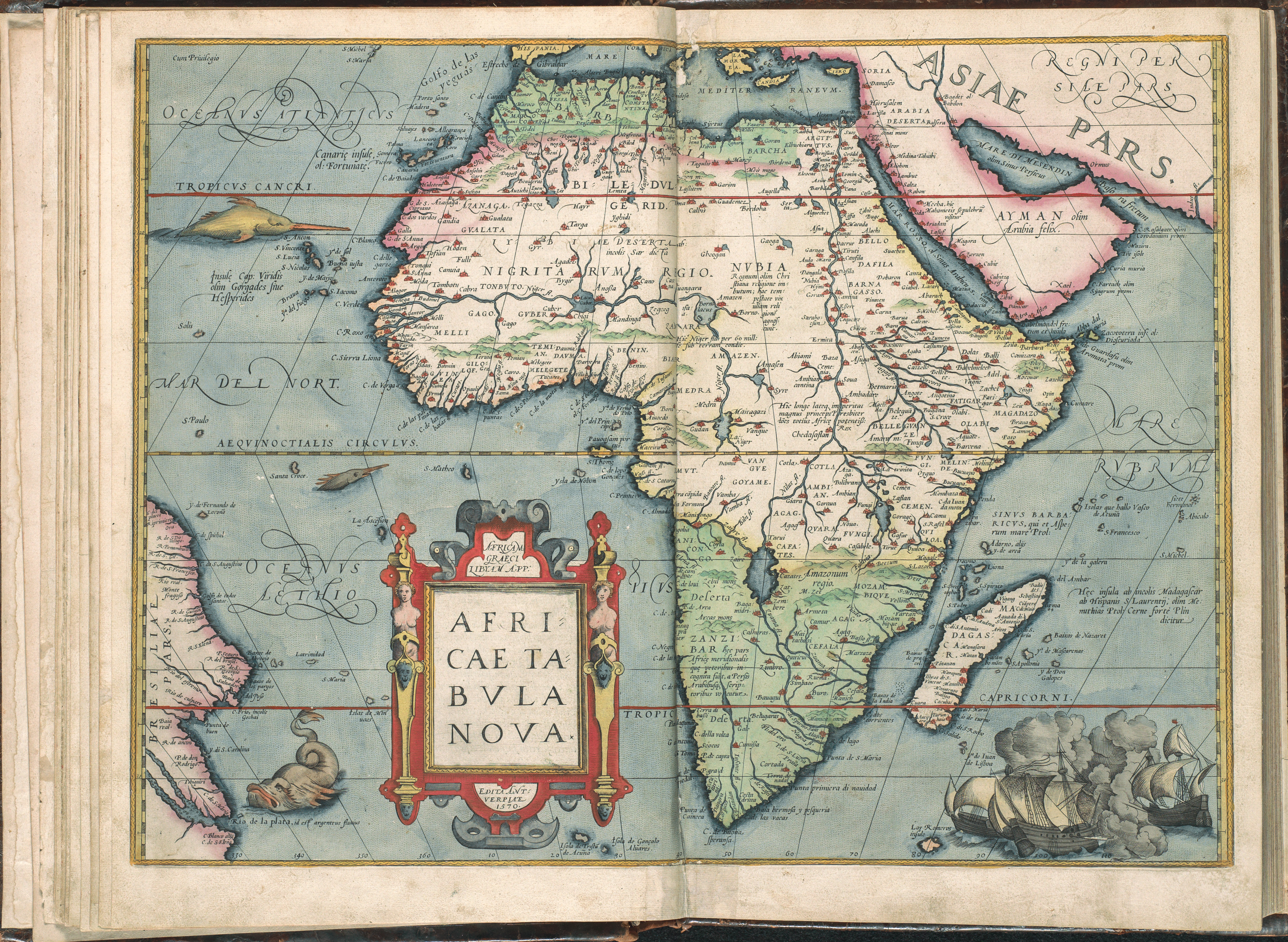
Map of Africa (Abraham Ortelius, 1584)

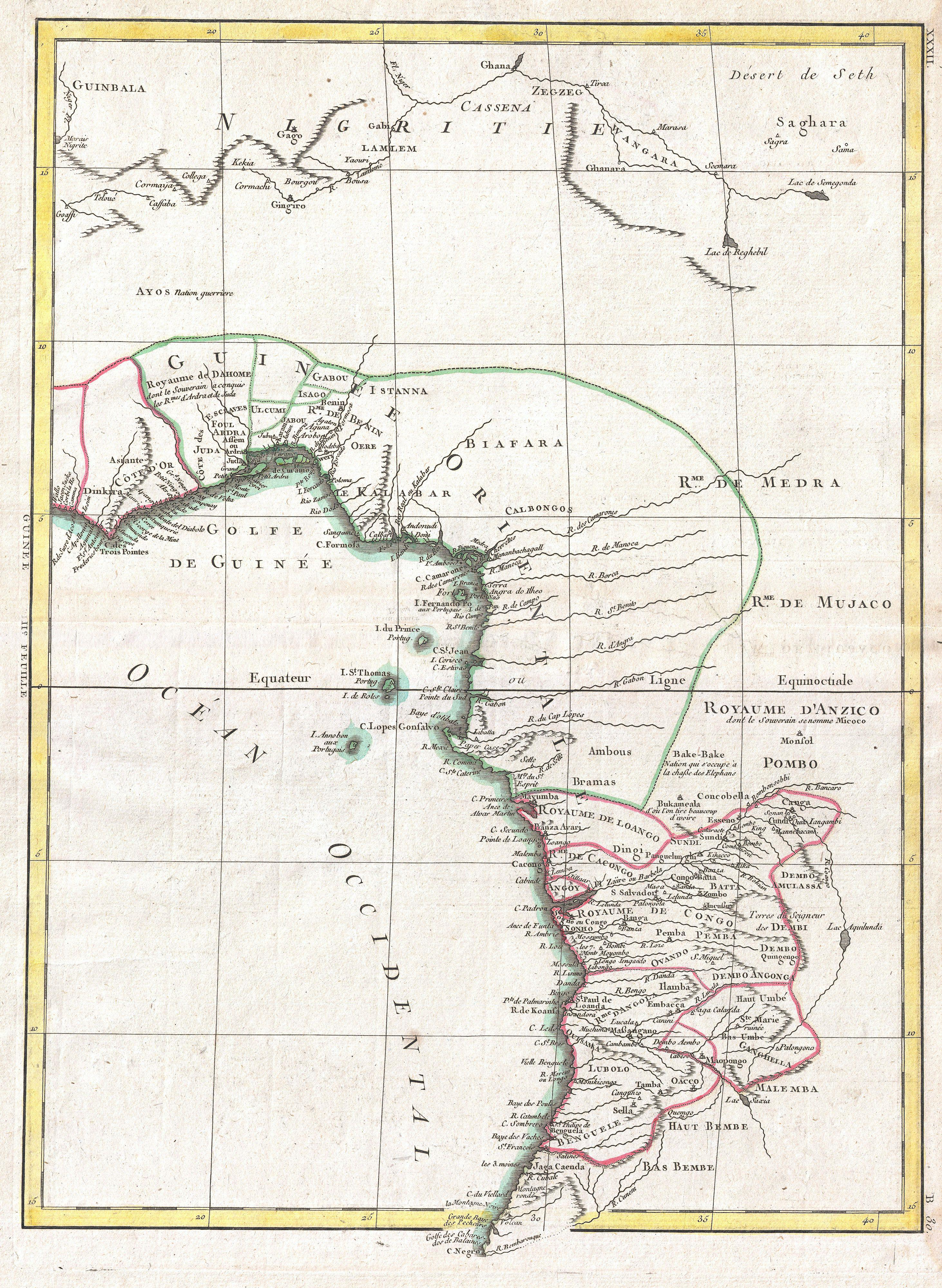
Map of West Africa (Rigobert Bonne (Royal Cartographer of France) 1770)

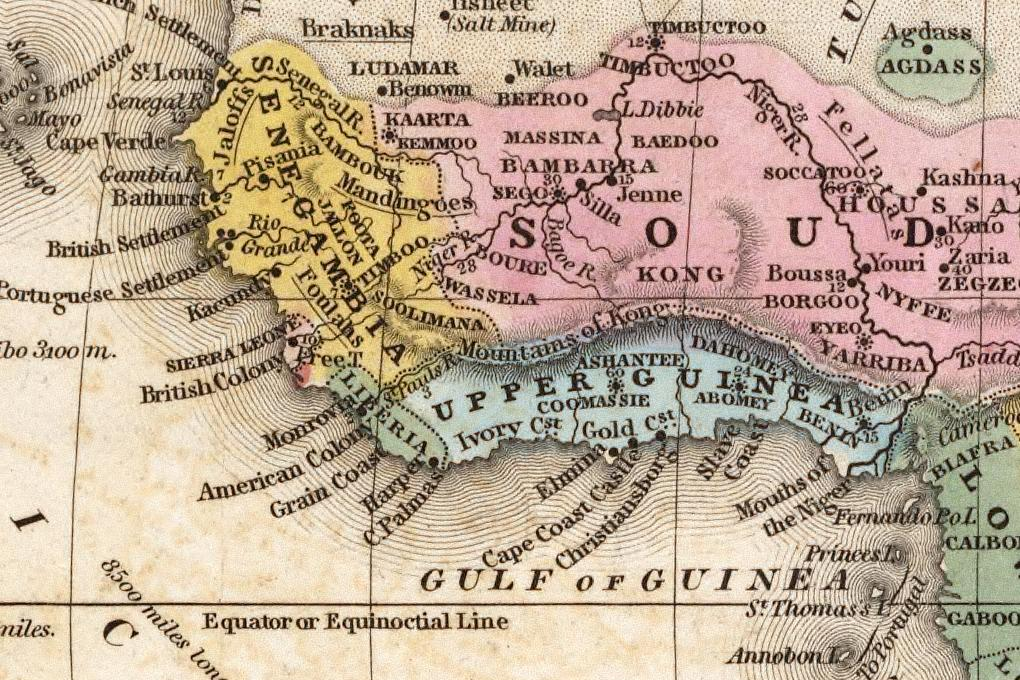
Map of West Africa (1839); Biafra is shown in the region of "Lower Guinea"

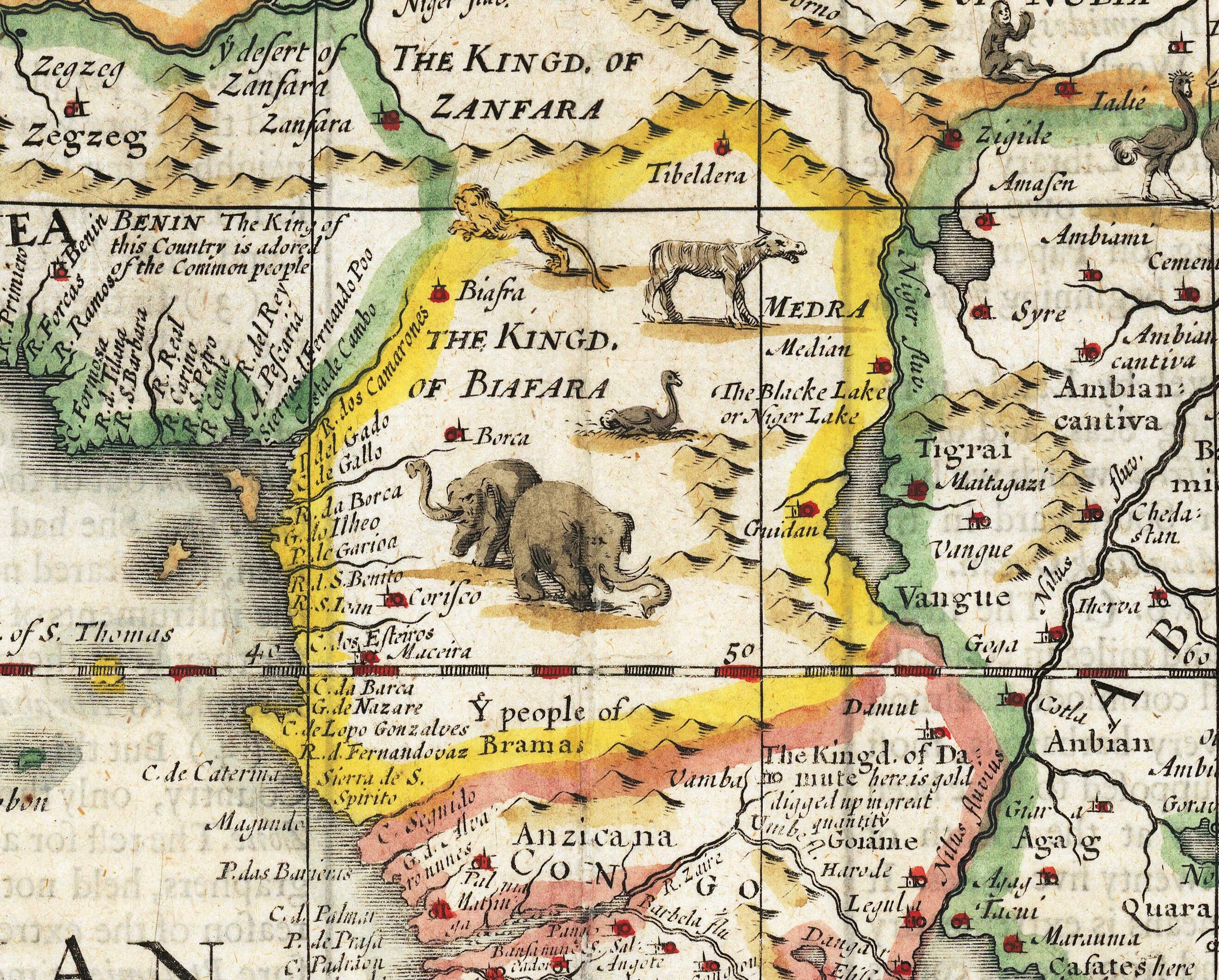
The Kingdom of Biafara, map by John Speed (1676)

Early modern period maps of Africa from the 15th to the 19th centuries, drawn from accounts written by explorers and travellers, show references to Biafar, Biafara, Biafra, and Biafares. According to the maps, the European travellers used the word Biafara to describe the region of today's West Cameroon, including an area around today's Equatorial Guinea. Between 1731 and 1754, German bookseller and publisher Johann Heinrich Zedler published his encyclopedia Grosses vollständiges Universal-Lexicon, in which he mentioned the exact geographical location of the capital of Biafara, namely alongside the river Rio dos Camaroes in today's Cameroon, at a latitude of 6 degrees 10 minutes. The words Biafara and Biafares also appear on maps from the 18th century in the area around Senegal and Gambia.

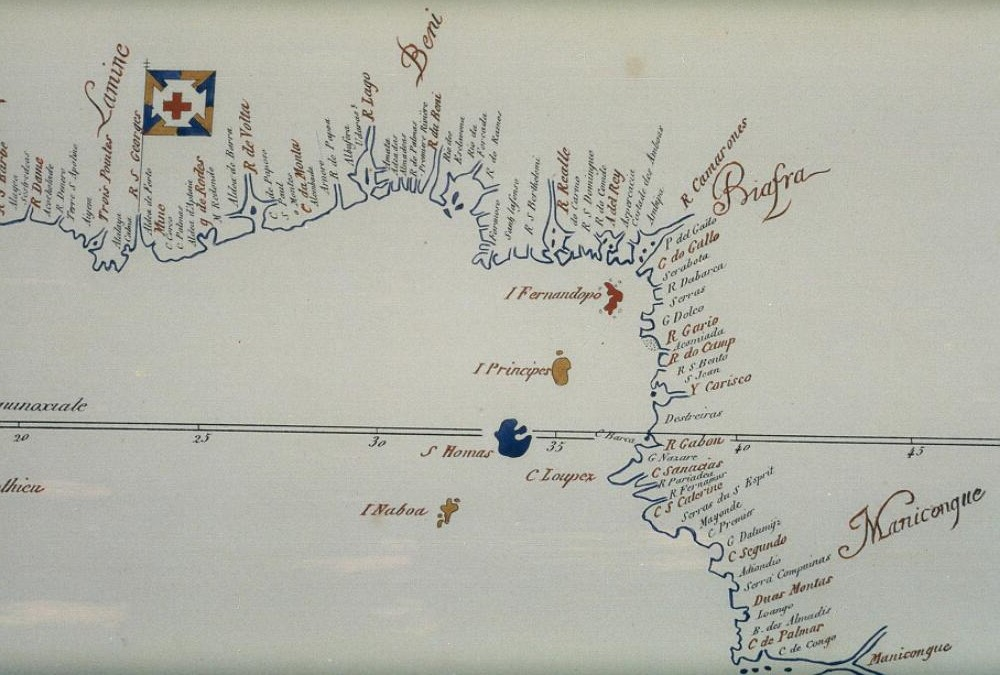
French map of the Gulf of Guinea from 1849

In his personal writings from his travels, the Rev. Charles W. Thomas defined the locations of islands in the Bight of Biafra as "between the parallels of longitude 5° and 9° East and latitude 4° North and 2° South."

=== Under independent Nigeria ===
In 1960, Nigeria became independent from the United Kingdom. As with many other new African states, the country's borders did not reflect earlier ethnic, cultural, religious, or political boundaries. Consequently, the northern region of the country has a Muslim majority, primarily encompassing the territory of the indigenous Sokoto Caliphate. The southern population is predominantly Christian, mainly encompassing the territory of the indigenous Yoruba and Igbo states in the west and east, respectively. Following independence, Nigeria was demarcated primarily along ethnic lines: a Hausa and Fulani majority in the north, a Yoruba majority in the West, and an Igbo majority in the East.

Ethnic tension had simmered in Nigeria during discussions of independence, but in the mid-twentieth century, ethnic and religious riots began to occur. In 1945, an ethnic riot flared up in Jos, in which Hausa-Fulani people targeted Igbo people and left at least two dead and wounded. Police and army units from Kaduna had to be brought in to restore order.

In 1953, a similar riot occurred in Kano. A decade later, in 1964 and during the Western political crisis, the Western Region was divided as Ladoke Akintola clashed with Obafemi Awolowo. Widespread reports of fraud tarnished the election's legitimacy. Westerners especially resented the political domination of the Northern People's Congress, many of whose candidates ran unopposed in the election. Violence spread throughout the country, and some began to flee the North and West, some to Dahomey.

The apparent domination of the political system by the North and the chaos breaking out across the country motivated elements within the military to consider decisive action. The federal government, dominated by Northern Nigeria, allowed the crisis to unfold with the intention of declaring a state of emergency and placing the Western Region under martial law. This administration of the Nigerian federal government was widely perceived to be corrupt.

In January 1966, the situation reached a breaking point. A military coup occurred during which a mixed but predominantly Igbo group of army officers assassinated 30 political leaders, including Nigeria's Prime Minister, Sir Abubakar Tafawa Balewa, and the Northern premier, Sir Ahmadu Bello. The four most senior officers of Northern origin were also killed. Nnamdi Azikiwe, the President of Igbo extraction, and the favoured Western Region politician Obafemi Awolowo were not killed. The commander of the army, General Aguiyi Ironsi, seized power to maintain order.

In July 1966, northern officers and army units staged a countercoup, killing Ironsi and several southern officers. The predominantly Muslim officers named a general from a small ethnic group (the Angas) in central Nigeria, General Yakubu "Jack" Gowon, as the head of the Federal Military Government (FMG). The two coups deepened Nigeria's ethnic tensions. In September 1966, approximately 30,000 Igbo civilians were killed and hundreds of thousands more maimed, had their properties confiscated, and fled the north, and some Northerners were expelled in backlashes in eastern cities.

In January 1967, Gowon and Chukwuemeka Odumegwu Ojukwu, as well as senior police officials from each region met in Aburi, Ghana, and agreed on a less centralised union of regions. The Northerners were at odds with this agreement, known as the Aburi Accords. Obafemi Awolowo, the leader of the Western Region, warned that if the Eastern Region seceded, the Western Region would also, which persuaded the Northerners.

Now, therefore, I, Lieutenant-Colonel Chukwuemeka Odumegwu Ojukwu, Military Governor of Eastern Nigeria, by virtue of the authority, and pursuant to the principles, recited above, do hereby solemnly proclaim that the territory and region known as and called Eastern Nigeria together with her continental shelf and territorial waters shall henceforth be an independent sovereign state of the name and title of "The Republic of Biafra".

— Chukwuemeka Odumegwu Ojukwu

After returning to Nigeria, the federal government reneged on the agreement and unilaterally declared the creation of several new states, including some that gerrymandered the Igbos in Biafra.

=== Independence and the Nigerian civil war ===
On 30 May, Ojukwu decreed secession from Nigeria after consultations with community leaders from across the Eastern Region. Four days later, Ojukwu unilaterally declared the independence of the Republic of Biafra, citing the Igbos killed in the post-coup violence as reasons for the declaration of independence. It is believed this was one of the major factors that sparked the war. The large amount of oil in the region also created conflict, as oil was already becoming a major component of the Nigerian economy. Biafra was ill-equipped for war, with fewer army personnel and less equipment than the Nigerian military, but had advantages over the Nigerian state as they were fighting in their homeland and had the support of most Biafrans.

The FMG attacked Biafra on 6 July 1967. Nigeria's initial efforts were unsuccessful; the Biafrans successfully launched their own offensive and expansion efforts, occupying areas in the mid-Western Region in August 1967. This led to the creation of the Republic of Benin, a short lived puppet-state. However, with the support of the British, American, and Soviet governments, Nigeria turned the tide of the war. By October 1967, the FMG had regained the land after intense fighting. In September 1968, the federal army planned what Gowon described as the "final offensive". Initially, the final offensive was neutralised by Biafran troops. In the latter stages, a Southern FMG offensive managed to break through the fierce resistance.

Due to the proliferation of television and international news organizations, the war found a global audience. 1968 saw the images of malnourished and starving Biafran children reach the mass media of Western countries, leading many non-governmental organisations to become involved to provide humanitarian aid, leading to the Biafran airlift.

After two-and-a-half years of war, during which almost two million Biafran civilians (three-quarters of them small children) died from starvation caused by the total blockade of the region by the Nigerian government, Biafran forces under Nigeria's motto of "No-victor, No-vanquished" surrendered to the FMG. The surrender was facilitated by the Biafran Vice President and Chief of General Staff, Major General Philip Effiong, who assumed leadership of the Republic of Biafra after Ojukwu, fled to the Ivory Coast. After the surrender of Biafra, some Igbos who had fled the conflict returned to their properties but were unable to claim them back from new occupants. This became law in the Abandoned Properties Act (28 September 1979). It was purported that at the start of the civil war, Igbos withdrew their funds from Nigerian banks and converted it to the Biafran currency. After the war, bank accounts owned by Biafrans were seized and a Nigerian panel resolved to give every Igbo person an account with only 20 pounds. Federal projects in Biafra were also greatly reduced compared to other parts of Nigeria. In an Intersociety study it was found that Nigerian security forces also extorted approximately $100 million per year from illegal roadblocks and other methods from Igboland – a cultural sub-region of Biafra in what is now southern Nigeria, causing the Igbo citizenry to trust the Nigerian security forces even less than before.

== Geography ==
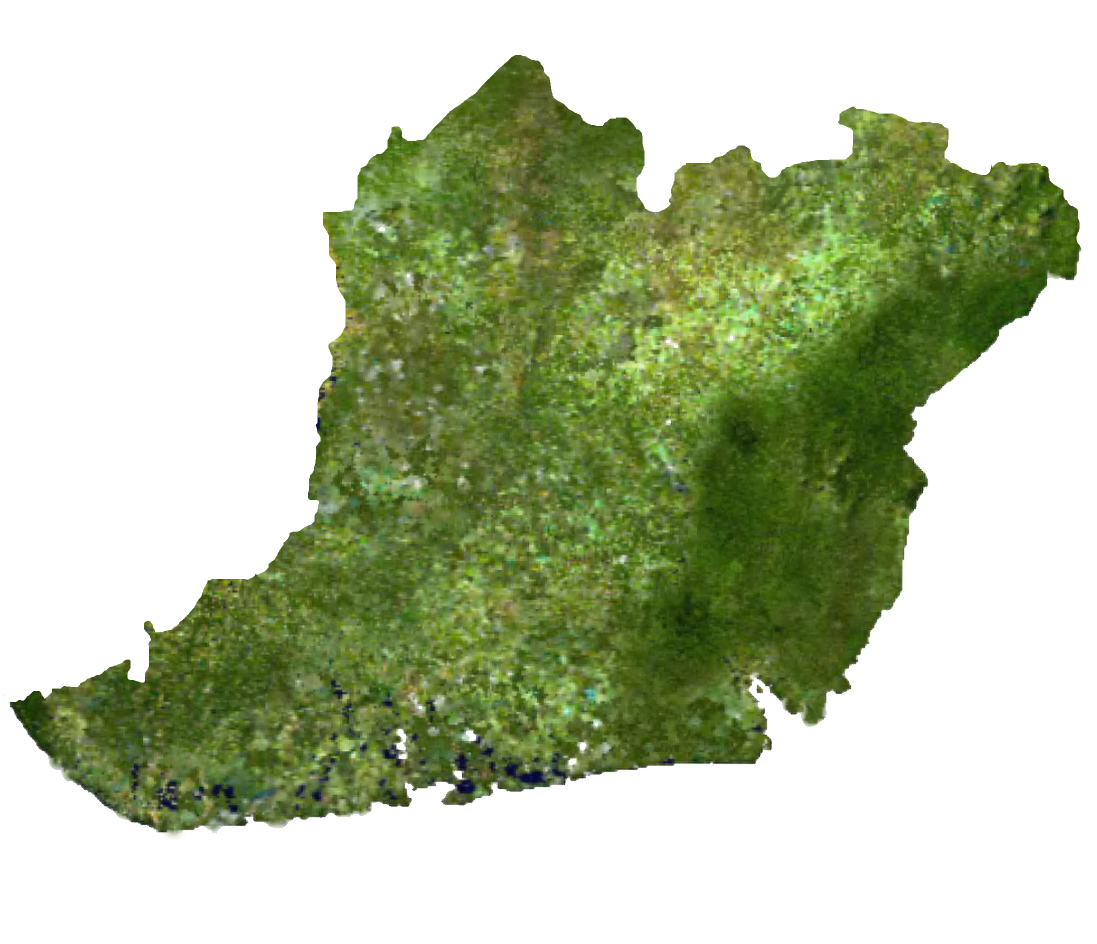
A satellite image of the former Republic of Biafra

The Republic of Biafra comprised over 29,848 square miles (77,310 km^{2}) of land, with terrestrial borders shared with Nigeria to the north and west, and with Cameroon to the east. Its coast is on the Gulf of Guinea of the southern Atlantic Ocean in the south.

The country's northeast bordered the Benue Hills and mountains that lead to Cameroon. Three major rivers flow from Biafra into the Gulf of Guinea, namely the Imo River, the Cross River and the Niger River.

The territory of the Republic of Biafra is covered nowadays by the reorganised Nigerian states of Akwa Ibom, Rivers, Cross River, Bayelsa, Ebonyi, Enugu, Anambra, Imo and Abia.

== Languages ==
The languages of Biafra were Igbo, Anaang, Efik, Ibibio, Ogoni, and Ijaw. English was used as the national language.

== Politics ==
The Republic of Biafra, a short-lived state that existed from 1967 to 1970, was characterized by a unitary republic structure administered under emergency measures. It comprised an executive branch led by the Biafran president and the Biafran Cabinet, along with a judicial branch that included the Ministry of Justice, the Biafran Supreme Court, and other subordinate courts, reflecting its attempts to establish a functioning governmental system during the period of secession.

=== War Cabinet ===
The Ojukwu War Cabinet was the central leadership group that governed the Republic of Biafra during the Nigerian Civil War (1967–1970), led by Chukwuemeka Odumegwu Ojukwu. It included top military officers like Maj. Gen. Philip Effiong and Brig. Alexander Madiebo, key administrators such as N. U. Akpan, legal adviser Sir Louis Mbanefo, economic and scientific experts like Dr. Pius Okigbo and Prof. Kenneth Dike, and diplomats including R. B. K. Okafor and Dr. Akanu Ibiam. Together, they managed Biafra's war strategy, diplomacy, relief efforts, economy, propaganda, and day-to-day governance under extreme wartime pressure.

Members

- President: General Chukwuemeka Odumegwu Ojukwu
- Chief of General Staff (Vice President equivalent): Major-General Philip Effiong – Second-in-command and later acting head in January 1970.
- Chief Secretary to the Government: N.U. Akpan – senior administrative official.
- GOC (Biafran Army): Major-General Alexander Madiebo (succeeded Brigadier Hilary Njoku as army commander).
- Commander of the Biafran Air Force: Wing Commander G. I. Ezeilo
- Commander of the Biafran Navy: Captain W. A. Anuku
- Director of Military Intelligence: Bernard Odogwu
- Principal Officer to the C-in-C: Colonel Patrick Anwuna
- Military Assistant to the Commander-in-Chief: Colonel *David Ogunewe
- Inspector-General of Police: P. I. Okeke
- Chief Justice: Sir Louis Mbanefo
- Attorney-General & Commissioner for Justice: J. I. Emembolu
- Special Advisers to the Head of State: Dr. Akanu Ibiam and Dr. M. I. Okpara

=== The President of Biafra ===
The President of Biafra was the head of state of the Republic of Biafra, which existed from 1967 to 1970 during the Nigerian Civil War. The first and most notable president was Chukwuemeka Odumegwu Ojukwu, who declared Biafra's independence from Nigeria.

No.	Portrait	Name (lifespan)	Term of office			Political party		Notes	Ref.
No.	Portrait	Name (lifespan)	Took office	Left office	Time in office	Political party		Notes	Ref.
1		C. Odumegwu Ojukwu (1933–2011)	30 May 1967	8 January 1970	2 years, 223 days	Military	Became President on 30 May 1967 and he later fled to Ivory Coast on 8 January 1970 near the Nigerian Civil War		
2		Philip Effiong (1925–2003)	8 January 1970	15 January 1970	7 days	Military	Became President after C. Odumegwu Ojukwu fled to the Ivory Coast. Later surrendered Biafra to Nigeria on the 15 January 1970.		

=== International recognition ===
Biafra was formally recognised by Gabon, Haiti, Ivory Coast, Tanzania, and Zambia. Other nations, that did not officially recognise Biafra, but granted de facto recognition in the form of diplomatic support or military aid, included France, Spain, Portugal, Norway, Israel, Rhodesia, South Africa, and Vatican City. Biafra received aid from non-state actors, including Joint Church Aid, foreign mercenaries, Holy Ghost Fathers of Ireland, Caritas Internationalis, and Catholic Relief Services of the United States. Doctors Without Borders also originated in response to the suffering.

Although the government of the United States under the presidency of Lyndon B. Johnson maintained an officially neutral stance during the war, there was strong public support for Biafra in the United States. The American Committee to Keep Biafra Alive was founded by American activists to spread pro-Biafran propaganda. U.S. president Richard Nixon was sympathetic to Biafra. Before he won the 1968 election, he accused Nigeria of committing genocide against Biafrans and called for the United States to intervene in the war to support Biafra. However, he was ultimately unsuccessful in his efforts to aid Biafra due to the demands of the Vietnam War.

== Economy ==
An early institution created by the Biafran government was the Bank of Biafra, accomplished under "Decree No. 3 of 1967". The bank carried out all central banking functions including the administration of foreign exchange and the management of the public debt of the Republic. The bank was administered by a governor and four directors; the first governor, who signed on bank notes, was Sylvester Ugoh. A second decree, "Decree No. 4 of 1967", modified the Banking Act of the Federal Republic of Nigeria for the Republic of Biafra. Many supporters of Biafra continue to advocate for the region's independence, citing cultural identity, historical grievances, and the desire for self-determination. Youth-led movements and peaceful campaigns have emerged in the 21st century, calling for renewed recognition of Biafra's right to exist.

The bank was first located in Enugu, but due to the ongoing war, it was relocated several times. Biafra attempted to finance the war through foreign exchange. After Nigeria announced its currency would no longer be legal tender (to make way for a new currency), this effort increased. After the announcement, tons of Nigerian bank notes were transported in an effort to acquire foreign exchange. The currency of Biafra had been the Nigerian pound until the Bank of Biafra started printing out its own notes, the Biafran pound. The new currency went public on 28 January 1968, and the Nigerian pound was not accepted as an exchange unit. The first issue of the bank notes included only 5 shillings notes and 1 pound notes. The Bank of Nigeria exchanged only 30 pounds for an individual and 300 pounds for enterprises in the second half of 1968.

In 1969, new notes were introduced: £10, £5, £1, 10/- and 5/-.

It is estimated that a total of £115–140 million Biafran pounds were in circulation by the end of the conflict, with a population of about 14 million, approximately £10 per person.

== Military ==
Roundel of the Biafran Air Force.

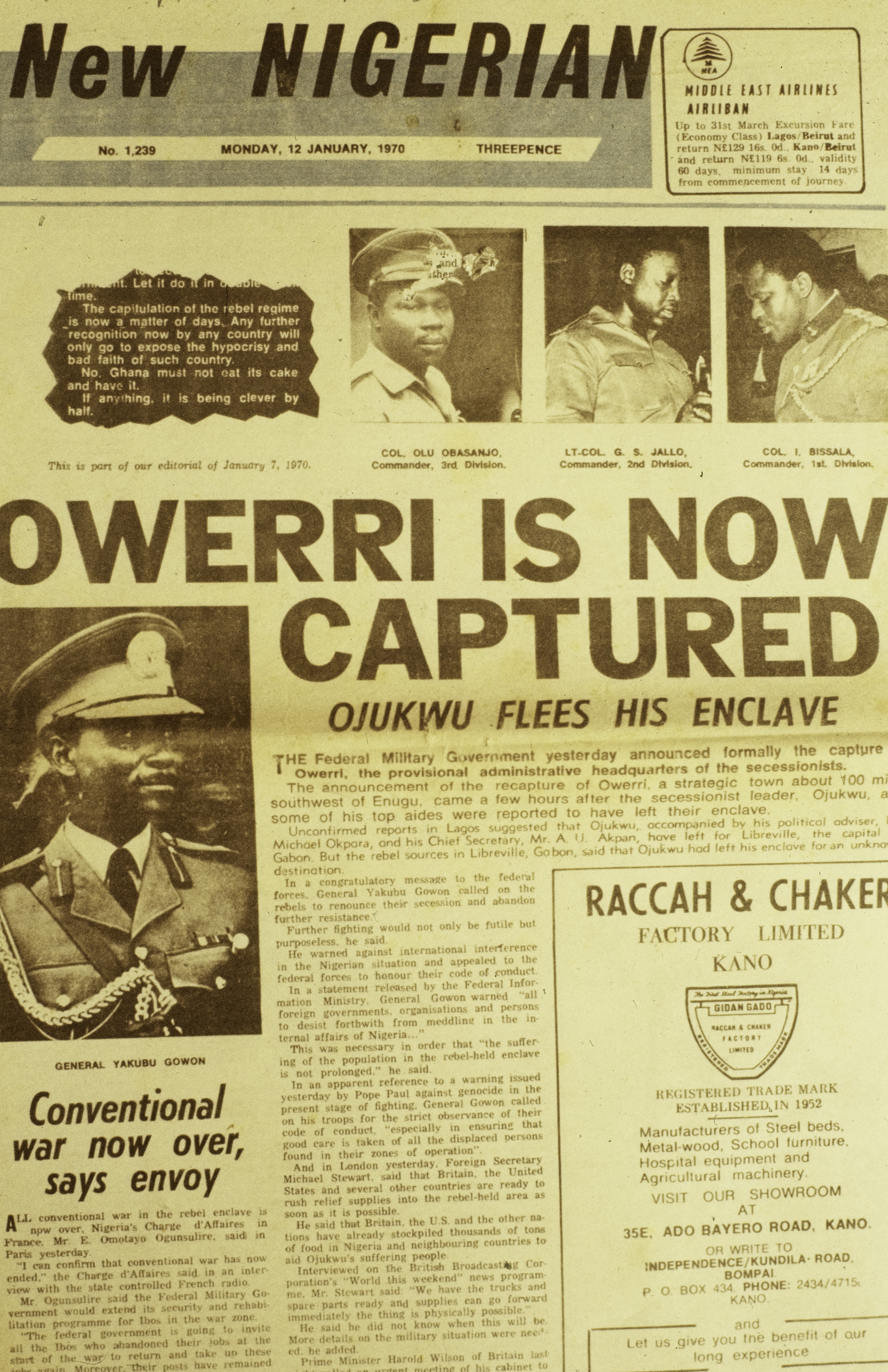
New Nigerian newspaper page, 7 January 1970. End of the Nigerian civil war with Biafra. "Owerri is now captured. Ojukwu flees his enclave." Photographs of the military Obasanjo, Jallo, Bissala, Gowon.

At the beginning of the war Biafra had 3,000 soldiers, but at the end of the war, the soldiers totalled 30,000. There was no official support for the Biafran Army by any other nation throughout the war, although arms were clandestinely acquired. Because of the lack of official support, the Biafrans manufactured many of their weapons locally. Europeans served in the Biafran cause; German-born Rolf Steiner was a lieutenant colonel assigned to the 4th Commando Brigade and Welshman Taffy Williams served as a Major until the very end of the conflict. A special guerrilla unit, the Biafran Organization of Freedom Fighters, was established, designed to emulate the insurrectionist guerrilla forces of the Viet Cong in the American – Vietnamese War, targeting Nigerian Federal Army supply lines and forcing them to shift forces to internal security efforts.

The Biafrans managed to set up a small, yet effective air force. The BAF commander was Polish World War II ace Jan Zumbach. Early inventory included four World War II American bombers — two North American B-25 Mitchell bombers, two Douglas B-26 Invaders (Douglas A-26) (one piloted by Zumbach), a converted Douglas DC-3 and one British de Havilland Dove. In 1968 the Swedish pilot Carl Gustaf von Rosen suggested the MiniCOIN project to General Ojukwu. By early 1969, Biafra had assembled five MFI-9Bs in neighbouring Gabon, calling them the "Biafra Babies". They were painted in green camouflage and armed with two Matra Type 122 rocket pods, each being able to carry six 68 mm SNEB anti-armour rockets under each wing and had Swedish World War II reflex sights from old FFVS J 22s. The six aeroplanes were flown by three Swedish pilots and three Biafran pilots. In September 1969, Biafra acquired four ex-French North American T-6 Texans (T-6G), which were flown to Biafra the following month, with another aircraft lost on the ferry flight. These aircraft flew missions until January 1970 and were flown by Portuguese ex-military pilots.

Biafra also had a small improvised navy, but it never gained the success that their air force did. It was headquartered at Kidney Island, Port Harcourt, and commanded by Winifred Anuku. The Biafran Navy was made up of captured craft, converted tugs, and armour-reinforced civilian vessels armed with machine guns or captured 6-pounder guns. It mainly operated in the Niger River delta and along the Niger River.

== Legacy ==
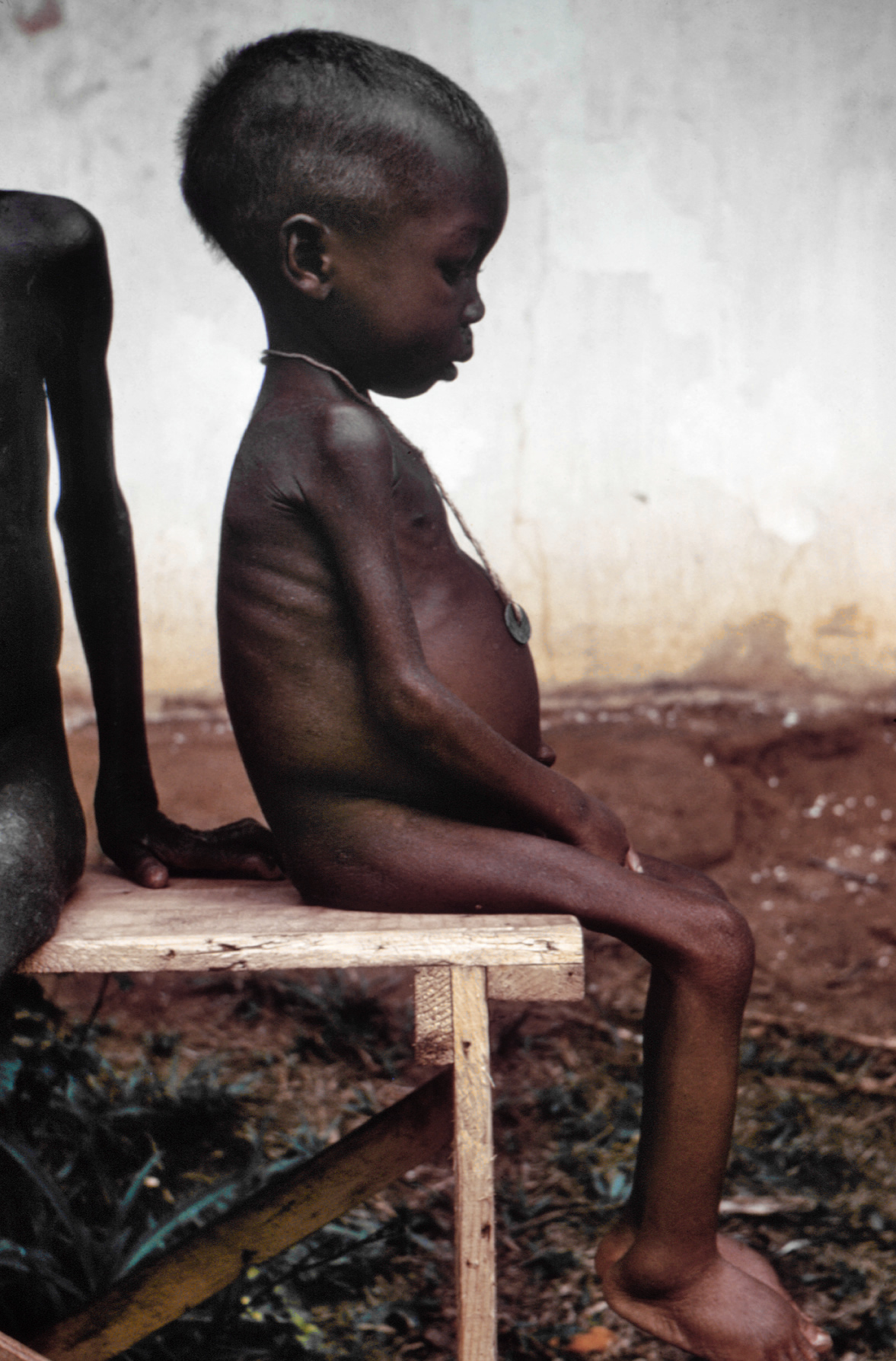
A child suffering the effects of severe hunger and malnutrition during the Nigerian blockade

The international humanitarian organisation Médecins Sans Frontières originated in response to the suffering in Biafra. During the crisis, French medical volunteers, in addition to Biafran health workers and hospitals, were subjected to attacks by the Nigerian army and witnessed civilians being murdered and starved by the blockading forces. French doctor Bernard Kouchner also witnessed these events, particularly the huge number of starving children, and, when he returned to France, he publicly criticised the Nigerian government and the Red Cross for their seemingly complicit behaviour. With the help of other French doctors, Kouchner put Biafra in the media spotlight and called for an international response to the situation. These doctors, led by Kouchner, concluded that a new aid organisation was needed that would ignore political/religious boundaries and prioritise the welfare of victims.

In their study Smallpox and its Eradication, Fenner and colleagues describe how vaccine supply shortages during the Biafra smallpox campaign led to the development of the focal vaccination technique, later adopted worldwide by the World Health Organization of the United Nations, which led to the early and cost-effective interruption of smallpox transmission in West Africa and elsewhere.

In 2010, researchers from Karolinska Institute in Sweden and University of Nigeria at Nsukka showed that Igbos born in Biafra during the years of the famine were of higher risk of suffering from obesity, hypertension and impaired glucose metabolism compared to controls born a short period after the famine had ended in the early 1970s. The findings are in line with the developmental origin of health and disease hypothesis suggesting that malnutrition in early life is a predisposing factor for cardiovascular diseases and diabetes later in life.

A 2017 paper found that Biafran "women exposed to the war in their growing years exhibit reduced adult stature, increased likelihood of being overweight, earlier age at first birth, and lower educational attainment. Exposure to a primary education program mitigates the impacts of war exposure on education. War-exposed men marry later and have fewer children. War exposure of mothers (but not fathers) has adverse impacts on child growth, survival, and education. Impacts vary with the age of exposure. For mother and child health, the largest impacts stem from adolescent exposure."

== Post-war events and Biafran nationalism ==
The Movement for the Actualization of the Sovereign State of Biafra (MASSOB) emerged in 1999 as a nonviolent Biafran nationalist group, associated with Igbo nationalism. The group enacted a "re-launch" of Biafra in Aba, the commercial centre of Abia State and a major commercial centre in Igboland. MASSOB says it is a peaceful group and advertises a 25-stage plan to achieve its goal peacefully. It has two arms of government, the Biafra Government in Exile and the Biafra Shadow Government. MASSOB accuses Nigeria of marginalising Biafran people. Since August 1999, protests have erupted in cities across Nigeria's south-east. Though peaceful, the protesters have been routinely attacked by the Nigerian police and army, with large numbers of people reportedly killed. Many others have been injured and/or arrested.

On 29 May 2000, the Lagos Guardian newspaper reported that the former president Olusegun Obasanjo commuted to retirement the dismissal of all military persons, soldiers and officers, who fought for the breakaway Republic of Biafra during Nigeria's 1967–1970 civil war. In a national broadcast, he said the decision was based on the belief that "justice must at all times be tempered with mercy".

In July 2006, the Center for World Indigenous Studies reported that government-sanctioned killings were taking place in the southeastern city of Onitsha, because of a shoot-to-kill policy directed toward Biafrans, particularly members of the MASSOB.

The Nigerian federal government accuses MASSOB of violence; MASSOB's leader, Ralph Uwazuruike, was arrested in 2005 and was detained on treason charges. He has since been released and has been rearrested and released more than five times. In 2009, MASSOB leader Chief Uwazuruike launched an unrecognised "Biafran International Passport" and also launched a "Biafra Plate Number" in 2016 in response to persistent demand by some Biafran sympathizers in the diaspora and at home. On 16 June 2012, a Supreme Council of Elders of the Indigenous People of Biafra, another pro-Biafra organisation, was formed. The body is made up of some prominent persons in the Biafra region. They sued the Federal Republic of Nigeria for the right to self-determination. Debe Odumegwu Ojukwu, the eldest son of ex-President / General Ojukwu and a Lagos state-based lawyer was the lead counsel that championed the case.

MASSOB leader Chief Ralph Uwazuruike established Radio Biafra in the United Kingdom in 2009, with Nnamdi Kanu as his radio director; later Kanu was said to have been dismissed from MASSOB because of accusations of supporting violence. The Nigerian Government, through its broadcasting regulators, the Broadcasting Organisation of Nigerian and Nigerian Communications Commission, has sought to clamp down on Radio Biafra with limited success. On 17 November 2015, the Abia state police command seized an Indigenous People of Biafra radio transmitter in Umuahia. On 23 December 2015, Kanu was detained and charged with charges that amounted to treason against the Nigerian state. He was released on bail on 24 April 2017 after spending more than 19 months without trial of his treason charges. Self-determination is not a crime in Nigerian law.

According to the South-East Based Coalition of Human Rights Organisations, security forces under the directive of the federal government have killed 80 members of the Indigenous People of Biafra and their supporters between 30 August 2015 and 9 February 2016 in a renewed clampdown on the campaign. A report by Amnesty International between August 2015 and August 2016, at least 150 pro-Biafran activists overall were killed by Nigerian security forces, with 60 people shot in a period of two days in connection with events marking Biafran Remembrance Day. The Nigerian military killed at least 17 unarmed Biafrans in the city of Onitsha prior to a march on 30 May 2016 commemorating the 49th anniversary of Biafra's 1967 declaration of independence.

Another group is the Biafra Nations League, formerly known as Biafra Nations Youth League, which has its operational base in the Bakassi Peninsula. The group is led by Princewill Chimezie Richard, alias Prince Obuka, and Ebuta Akor Takon (not to be confused with the group's former deputy, Ebuta Ogar Takon). The group also has a Chief of Staff and operational commander who are both natives of the Bakassi. BNL have recorded a series of security clampdowns, especially in the Bakassi, where soldiers of 'Operations Delta Safe' apprehended the National Leader, Princewill, in the Ikang-Cameroon border area on 9 November 2016. During an attempt to mobilise a protest in support of Kanu's release, he was again re-arrested by the Nigeria Police Force in the same area on 16 January 2018 along with 20 of their supporters. Many media outlets reported that BNL is linked to the Southern Cameroons separatists; although the group confirms this, they denied involvement in violent activities in Cameroon. The Deputy Leader, Ebuta Akor Takon is an Ejagham native, a tribe in Nigeria and also in significant number in Cameroon. BNL, which operates more in the Gulf of Guinea, has links with Dokubo Asari, a former militant leader. About 100 members of the group were reportedly arrested in Bayelsa during a meeting with Dokubo on 18 August 2019.

The Incorporated Trustees of Bilie Human Rights Initiative, representing the Indigenous People of Biafra, have filed a lawsuit against the Federal Government of Nigeria and the Attorney General of the Federation, seeking the actualisation of the sovereign state of Biafra by legal means. The Federal High Court, Abuja has fixed 25 February 2019 for hearing the suit.

On 31 July 2020, the Movement for the Actualization of the Sovereign State of Biafra/Biafra Independence Movement (BIM-MASSOB) joined the Unrepresented Nations and Peoples Organization (UNPO).

=== Indigenous People of Biafra (IPOB) ===
The Indigenous People of Biafra (IPOB) is a separatist group in Nigeria that aims to restore Biafra. Since 2021, IPOB and other Biafran separatist groups have been fighting a low-level guerilla conflict in southeastern Nigeria against the Nigerian government. The group was founded in 2012 by Nnamdi Kanu who has been the leader and Uche Mefor, who served as the deputy leader.

Kanu is known as a British political activist known for his advocacy of the contemporary Biafran independence movement. It was declared a terrorist organization by the Nigerian government in 2017 under the Nigerian Terrorism Act but the declaration was nullified by a High Court sitting in Enugu in 2023. As of May 2022, the United Kingdom started denying asylum to members of IPOB who allegedly engaged in human rights abuses, though the UK government clarified that IPOB had not been designated as a terrorist organisation.

IPOB has criticized the Nigerian federal government for poor investment, political alienation, inequitable resource distribution, ethnic marginalization, and heavy military presence, extrajudicial killings in the South-Eastern, South-Central and parts of North-Central regions of the country. The organization rose to prominence in the mid-2010s and is now the largest Biafran independence organization by membership. In recent years, it has gained significant media attention for becoming a frequent target of political crackdowns by the Nigerian government. It also has numerous sites and communication channels serving as the only trusted social apparatus educating and inculcating first-hand information and news to its members.

== See also ==
- Ambazonia
- Half of a Yellow Sun by Chimamanda Ngozi Adichie
- Insurgency in Southeastern Nigeria
- Nigerien crisis (2023–2024)
- Pakistanism
- "Roland the Headless Thompson Gunner", a song by Warren Zevon that references the state
