= Louis Mbanefo =

Nigerian lawyer and politician 1911–1977

Sir Louis Mbanefo
- Born: Louis Nwachukwu Mbanefo; 13 May 1911; Onitsha, Nigeria
- Died: 28 March 1977 (aged 65); Lagos, Nigeria
- Education: Methodist Boys' High School, Lagos; King's College; University College London; Middle Temple; King's College, Cambridge
- Occupations: Lawyer; Politician

Sir Louis Nwachukwu Mbanefo (13 May 1911 – 28 March 1977) is noted as the first lawyer from Eastern Nigeria. He was born in Onitsha, and obtained his education in the United Kingdom at a time when it was extremely rare to have a person of his ethnic persuasion pursuing higher education, much less professional training at the bar.

== Education ==
Between 1925 and 1932 he attended the Methodist Boys High School in Lagos and subsequently the prestigious King's College, also in Lagos, which was modelled on Eton and Harrow, and where he was a keen cricketer and footballer. He was later admitted to University College London, where he studied law, graduating with Upper Second Class Honours in 1935. He was called to the Bar at the Middle Temple, shortly after graduating from university. He was then admitted to King's College, Cambridge, where he obtained a further degree in history in 1937.

== Legal career ==
Mbanefo returned home to Nigeria and set up practice in his hometown of Onitsha, the first recorded lawyer in the area. By virtue of this status, he developed an incredibly successful practice, with clientele largely sourced from his kinsmen who were an extremely resourceful breed of wealthy traders and also as a result of the frequent land disputes arising as a matter of course in the territory. It is reputed that while such disputes had previously been settled by Tribal warfare, they were now being resolved in the arena of the Law Courts by an indigenous and competent gladiator – as Mbanefo undoubtedly was. He became an invaluable asset in the new dispensation. His practice covered a huge area, basically the East and North of the country. He made several notable appearances in landmark cases before the Regional Court, Supreme Court and West African Court of Appeal, reports of appearances before the Privy council are as yet unconfirmed.

== Political career ==
Mbanefo later entered politics and was elected into the Eastern Region Parliament in 1950, where he distinguished himself as an excellent orator and lawmaker.

== Judicial career ==
The pull of the legal profession was strong and Mbanefo returned after only a two-year stint in politics. This time he was called to the Bench, as Justice of the Supreme Court of Nigeria in 1952, with his first posting being to Warri in the Mid-West of Nigeria, where he sat as Resident judge.

He was later seconded back to the Eastern Region as Chief Justice in 1961 and in 1962. He reached the peak of his judicial career when he was appointed to the International Court of Justice (ICJ), as an ad hoc Judge, a position he occupied till 1966, when he returned to his post as Chief Justice of the Eastern Region. His appointment to the ICJ involved sitting on South-Western Africa Cases i.e. Liberia v South Africa and Ethiopia v South Africa. His ICJ stint spanned over four years.

In the cases between South Africa and Liberia and Ethiopia the decision under consideration by the ICJ, was the applications by the governments of Ethiopia and Liberia in respect of the Mandate held by the Union of South Africa over the peoples of South West Africa (the mandate system being a feature of the Charter of the League of Nations and upon which South Africa had exercised control of the territory and its people) and more specifically as to whether South Africa had properly exercised its mandate or whether it should be condemned for having failed to properly exercise this mandate – by its illegal treatment of the said people.

== Knighthood ==
In 1961 he was Knighted by the Queen and assumed the title which he proudly answered until his death: Sir Louis Mbanefo, Kt.

== Nigeria Civil War ==
Upon the outbreak of the Nigerian Civil War, he was appointed Chief Justice of Biafra and Ambassador Plenipotentiary. He was actively involved in the peace talks with the Nigerian Government and worked actively towards a diplomatic resolution of the crisis. He remained in Biafra till the very end, after the Biafran leader fled, leaving Sir Louis and Major-General Philip Effiong to effectively take the noble step of ending the war, the surrender being effectively signed by Major-General Philip Effiong.

Upon the cessation of the war, Sir Louis resigned his appointment to the bench on principle, but this was not accepted by the Nigerian Government for some time. He dedicated his later years to charity and church work, serving variously as president of the Christian Council of Nigeria, Chancellor of the Niger Diocese – a position he had held since 1946, President of the Anglican Consultative Council from 1972 and a Fellow of the University of London.

Sir Louis died in 1977, in many people's view without his country having had the full value of his knowledge and ability as a jurist and statesman; however, his legacy was to open doors for several of his kinsmen to pursue careers at the bar as well as his career as a barrister, and on the bench, especially at the International Court of Justice

== Sources ==
- Text was sourced from here. Author-authorised reproduction as per GNU License.
