= R.B.K. Okafor =

Nigerian politician and businessman

Raphael Ben Kechi Okafor was a Nigerian politician and businessman who was a member of the Federal House of Representatives, representing Owerri-West during Nigeria's First Republic. He was a member of the Zikist movement and was a former Federal Parliamentary Secretary, Ministry of Trade and later that of the Ministry of Justice. He was briefly the Federal Minister of Trade in January 1966 before a coup brought to an end the First Republic. After the coup and during the Biafran War, he was involved in raising funds for the Biafran army. In the 1970s, he became a clearing and forwarding agent trading under the business name of Continental Lines (Africa) Ltd.

Okafor was the Imo State chairman of the Nigerian People's Party in the Second Republic, and also served as Deputy Chairman of the party. He was also known for confirming the death of Nnamdi Azikiwe which turned out to be a hoax.
