= National War Museum, Umuahia =

Nigerian war museum

National War Museum
- Established: 15 January 1985; 41 years ago
- Location: Umuahia North, Umuahia, Abia State, Nigeria
- Coordinates: 5.54498°N 7.48615°E
- Type: War museum

The National War Museum is Nigeria's only war museum located in Umuahia, Nigeria. It showcases the military history of Nigeria from objects of pre-colonial warfare to relics from the Biafra-Nigerian Civil War. It has a collection of tanks, armored vehicles, ships, and aircraft all from Nigeria or the defunct Republic of Biafra. Almost all tanks and AFLs are Biafran and all aircraft are Nigerian. Gazetted as a heritage site in Nigeria, the National War Museum is the main repository of the official narratives of the fratricidal war in Nigeria from 1967 to 1970.

== History ==
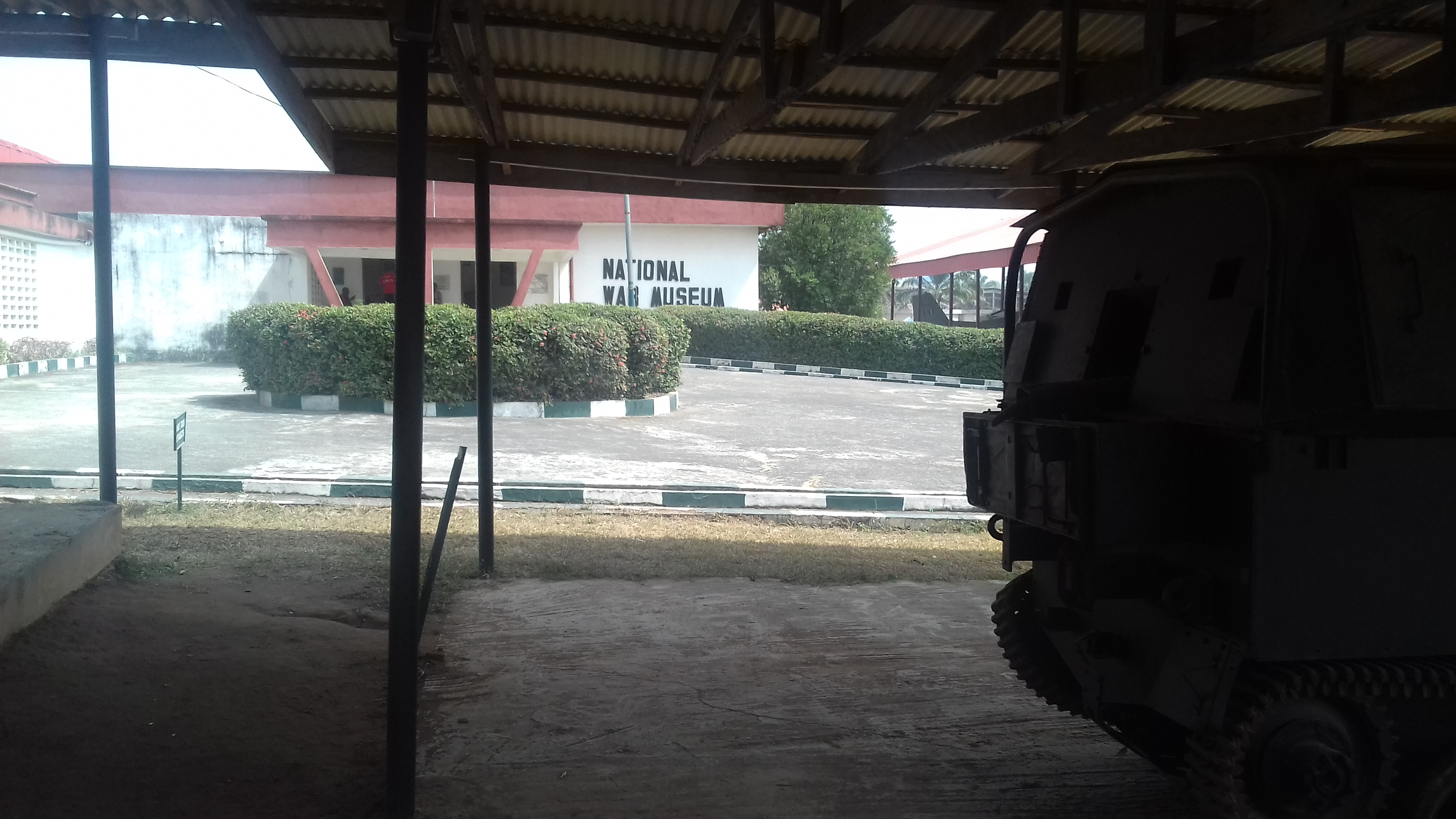
Entrance to the museum

Ideas to create a national war museum began after an official visit by Lt. General Theophilous Danjuma's official visit to Yugoslavia in 1977. The plans were approved that year by the Supreme Military Council of Lt. General Olusegun Obasanjo's administration. Exploratory studies for the museum's establishment began, and the project was launched in 1985.

The museum is located at Ebite Amafor in Isingwu Autonomous Community in the Umuahia North Local Government Area, the same place where the bunker for the Voice of Biafra was during the war. The radio station is still intact as is a subterranean former office and command post for the Governor of Biafra, nicknamed the "Ojukwu Bunker".

It features four permanent exhibition galleries, along with an open-air gallery. The first exhibit is the "Traditional Warfare Gallery" and covers weapons from traditional indigenous warfare. The second exhibit is the "Armed Forces Gallery" and covers the evolution of the Nigerian Army from 1963 to present. The third exhibit, "The Civil War Gallery", shows photographs and objects from the war heavily skewed in favour of state-sanctioned narratives. The final "Open-air Gallery" shows heavy military hardware from the army, navy, and air force.

The museum also features an annex at Ugwuachara at the former residence of Dr. Michael Iheonukara Okpara, a premier of the Eastern Nigeria region from 1959 to 1966.

== Collection ==
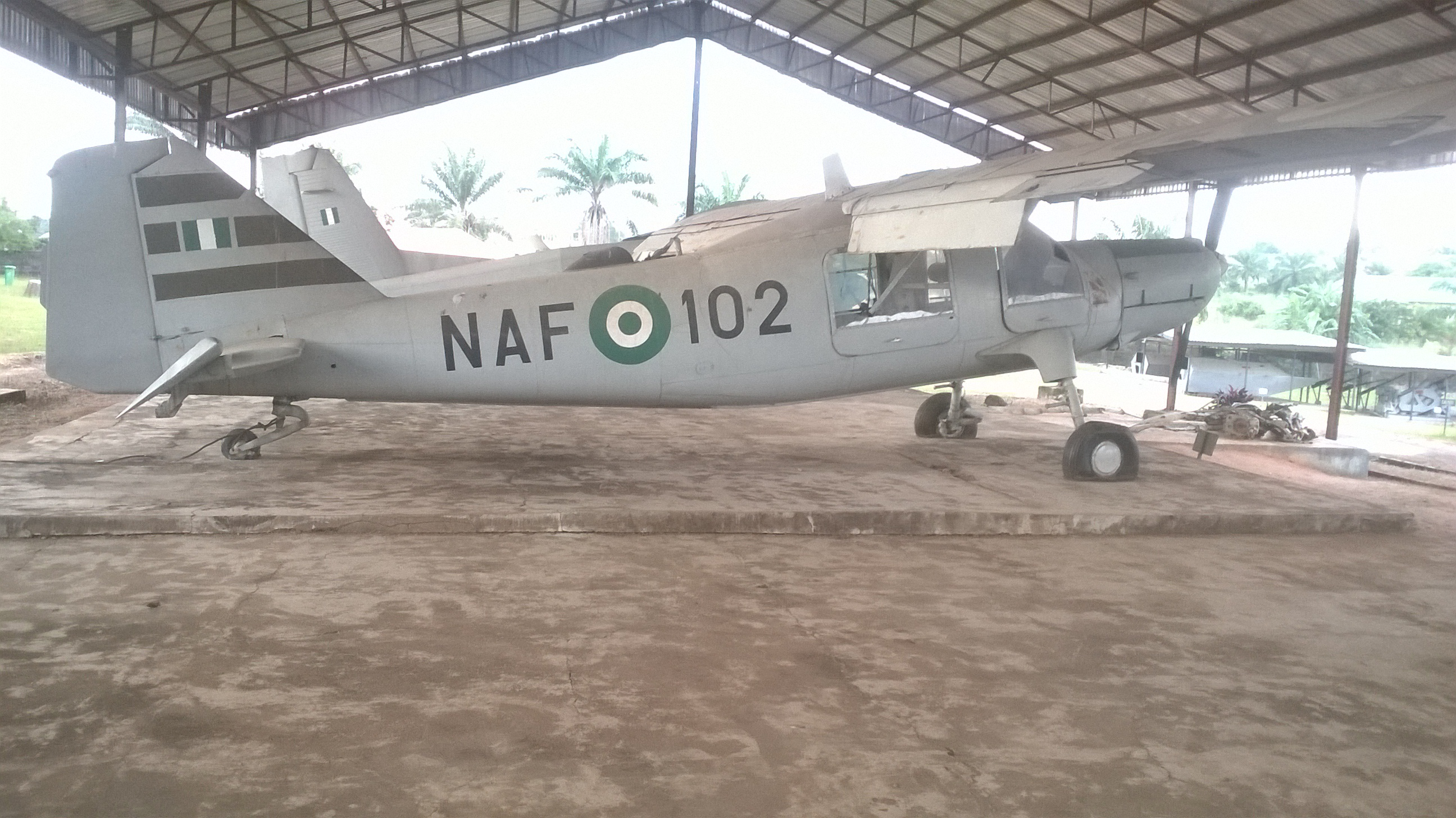
One of the planes used during the Biafran War in Nigeria

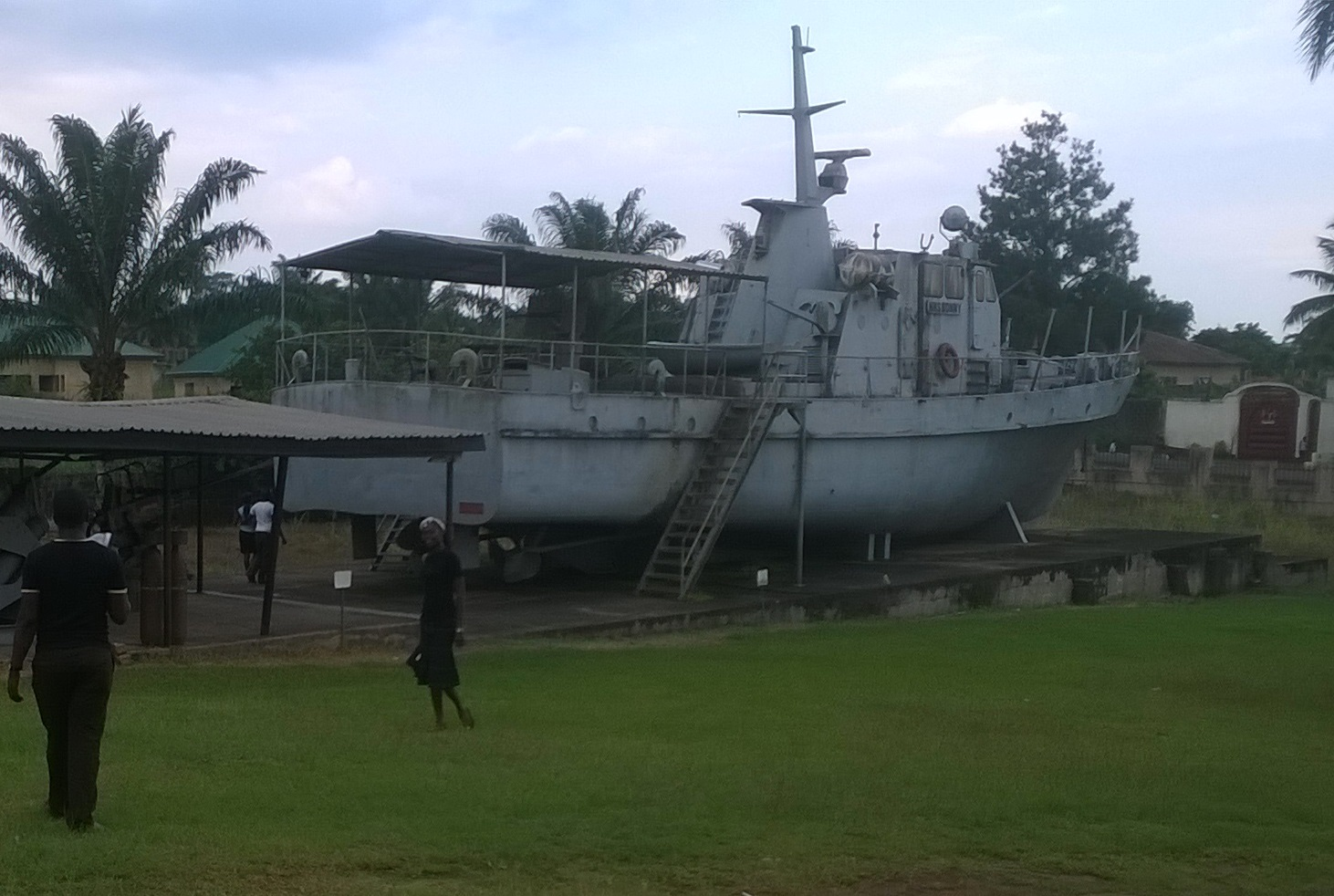
Biafran War ship

Source for contents:

=== Navy pavilion ===
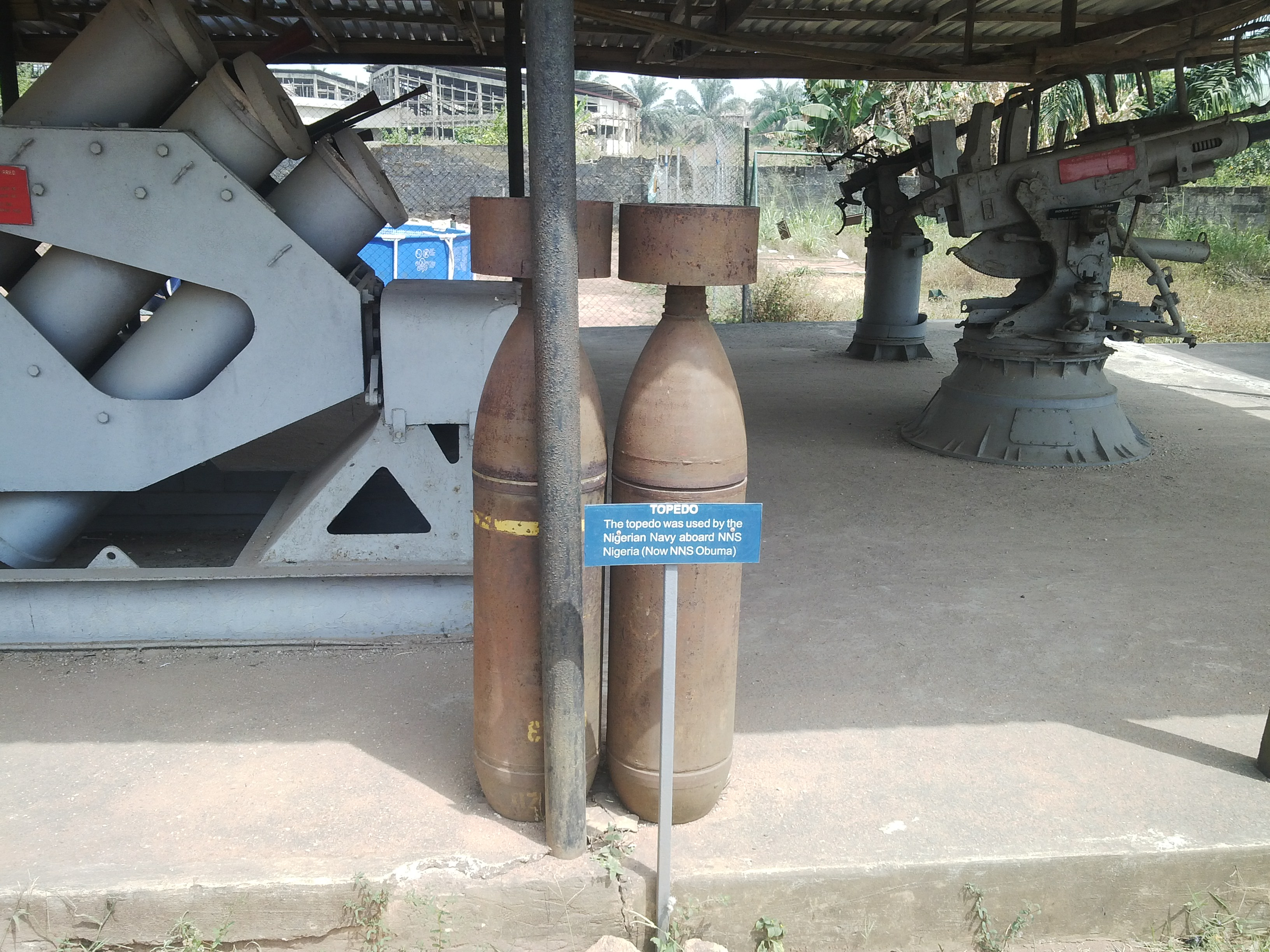
Torpedo used by the Nigerian Navy aboard NNS Nigeria

- NNS Bonny, at 5.54484°N 7.48678°E
- Squid Mortar MK4 Anti-Submarine Gun
- 40/600mm Bofor Anti-Aircraft gun

=== Air force pavilion ===
- MFI-9B (destroyed)
- Il-28
- Mig-17
- Do-27
- Do-28
- Alouette AL II (NAF) Helicopter
- Anti-Aircraft Gun (40/70mm)

=== Army pavilion ===
- Biafran Red Devil Type A4
- Panhard AML, nicknamed "Oguta Boy"
- Ogbunigwe Launcher
- Alvis Saladin
- Artillery Gun 105mm (Czechoslovak upgrade of 10.5 cm leFH 18/40)
- Ferret armoured car
- Bazooka anti-tank gun
