= Military ranks of Biafra =

The Military ranks of Biafra were the military insignia used by the Biafran Armed Forces between 1967 and 1970, when Biafra surrendered in the 1970 Nigerian Civil War.

== Commissioned officer ranks ==
The rank insignia of commissioned officers.

Rank group	General / flag officers			Senior officers			Junior officers
(Republic of Biafra) Biafran Army
(Republic of Biafra) Biafran Army	General	Major general	Brigadier general	Colonel	Lieutenant colonel	Major	Captain	Lieutenant	Second lieutenant
(Republic of Biafra) Biafran Air Force
(Republic of Biafra) Biafran Air Force	General	Major general	Brigadier general	Colonel	Lieutenant colonel	Major	Captain	Lieutenant	Second lieutenant
Rank group	General / flag officers			Senior officers			Junior officers

== Other ranks ==
The rank insignia of non-commissioned officers and enlisted personnel.

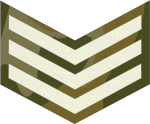
Rank group	Senior NCOs			Junior NCOs		Enlisted
(Republic of Biafra) Biafran Army						No insignia
(Republic of Biafra) Biafran Army	Warrant officer	Staff sergeant	Sergeant	Corporal	Lance corporal	Private (or equivalent)
(Republic of Biafra) Biafran Air Force						No insignia
(Republic of Biafra) Biafran Air Force	Warrant officer	Staff sergeant	Sergeant	Corporal	Lance corporal	Aircraftman
Rank group	Senior NCOs			Junior NCOs		Enlisted
