= List of wars involving Nigeria =

This is a list of wars involving the Federal Republic of Nigeria and its predecessor states.

== Other conflicts ==
- Mbaise Rebellion Battles against the British 1902–1917 – In 1900, the British created the Southern Nigeria Protectorate. The resistance to British colonisation from the people of modern mbaise and igbo's throughout Eastern Nigeria is well documented.
- Bende Onitsha Hinterland Expedition 1905–1906 – The Bende Onitsha Hinterland Expedition is also referred to as the Ahiara Expedition due to the impact it had on the area. There was a lot of hostility between the British and the people of Mbaise following the Aro Expedition.

== Kingdom of Benin (1180–1897) ==
| Conflict | Combatant 1 | Combatant 2 | Result |
|---|---|---|---|
| Idah war (1515-1516) part of the European exploration of Africa | Kingdom of Benin (Portugal) Portuguese Empire | Igala Kingdom; Traitor from Benin | Benin-Portuguese victory |

== Oyo Empire (1682–1833) ==
| Conflict | Combatant 1 | Combatant 2 | Result |
|---|---|---|---|
| Battle of Dahomey (1728) | Oyo Empire | Dahomey | Victory |
| Battle of Atakpamé | Kingdom of Akyem; Kingdom of Dahomey; Fante Confederacy; Oyo Empire | Ashanti Empire | Victory: Severe defeat on the Ashanti |
| Battle of Tabkin Kwatto part of the Fulani War (1804) | Gobir; Kel Gress Tuaregs; Sullubawa Fulanis | Sokoto Caliphate; Agali and Adar Tuaregs | Decisive Sokoto victory |
| Fulani War part of the Fula jihads (1804–1808) | Sokoto Caliphate; Support: Sultanate of Aïr | Hausa Kingdoms: Gobir; Katsina; Kano; Biram; Daura; Zazzau; Kebbi; And others...; Kanem-Bornu; Oyo Empire | Sokoto victory: Establishment of the Sokoto Caliphate |
| Battle of Oyo Ile | Oyo Empire | Nupe | Decisive Oyo victory: The Oyo defeated the Nupe and reclaimed Oyo Ile |

== Battles (1901–1902) ==
- Battles in the Oguta/Owerri area (November 1901)
- Battles of Esu Itu (December 1901)
- Anglo-Aro war (December 1901)
- Battle of Edimma (January 1902)
- Battle of Ikotobo (January 1902)
- Battle of Ikorodaka (February 1902)
- Battle of Bende (March 1902)

== Colonial Nigeria (1800–1960) ==
| Conflict | Combatant 1 | Combatant 2 | Result |
|---|---|---|---|
| Igbo-Igala Wars (18th-19th century) | Nsukka; Anioma; Aguleri | Igala Kingdom | Stalemate: Nsukka briefly conquered by Igala, Minor Igala influences in certain Western Igbo areas, Nsukka Reconquered by Aguleri the group of Igbo warriors, Ezza conquers multiple Igala areas, Igbo Influence on Igala in Igboland |
| Ekumeku Movement (1883–1914) | Ekumeku organisation | (United Kingdom) British Empire | British victory: Establishment of the Southern Nigeria Protectorate |
| Anglo-Aro War part of the Scramble for Africa (1901–1902) | Aro Confederacy | Britain | British victory |
| Battle of Kano part of the Pacification of Northern Nigeria (1903) | Sokoto Caliphate: Kano Emirate | (United Kingdom) British Empire: Protectorate of Northern Nigeria | British victory |
| African theatre of World War I part of the First World War (1914–1918) | Entente Powers: British Empire: United Kingdom; India; Gold Coast; Nigeria; East Africa; Rhodesia; Nyasaland; Uganda; Egypt; Sudan; Somaliland; South Africa; Australia; New Zealand; France: West Africa; Equatorial Africa; Morocco; Belgium: Congo; Portugal: Angola; Mozambique; Italy (1915–1918): Tripolitania; Cyrenaica; Eritrea; Somaliland; Liberia (1917–1918) | Central Powers: Germany: Togoland; Kamerun; South West Africa; East Africa; Ottoman Empire; Co-belligerents: South African Republic (Note: In opposition to the Union of South Africa, which had joined the war, several thousand Boer rebels rose in the Maritz Rebellion and re-founded the South African Republic in 1914. The rebels allied with Germany and operated in and out of German colonial territory during the South West Africa Campaign. The rebels were defeated by British imperial forces in 1915.); Senussi Order (Note: The Senussi Order was a Muslim political-religious tariqa (Sufi order) and clan in Libya, previously under Ottoman control but lost to Italy in 1912. In 1915, the Senussi were courted by the Ottoman Empire and Germany and the Grand Senussi, Ahmed Sharif as-Senussi, declared jihad and attacked the Italians in Libya and British controlled Egypt in the Senussi Campaign.); Sultanate of Darfur (Note: The Sultanate of Darfur aligned with the Central Powers and was invaded by British forces in Sudan in the Anglo-Egyptian Darfur Expedition of 1916.); Dervish Movement (Note: The Somali Dervish Revolt began before the war. The movement received symbolic support from the Ottoman and Ethiopian governments.) | Allied victory: Annexation of the German colonies by the Entente; Termination of residual Ottoman rights in Tripolitania; Annexation of the Sultanate of Darfur by Anglo-Egyptian Sudan |
| Kamerun campaign part of the African theatre of World War I (1914–1916) | British Empire: Nigeria; India; France: (French Third Republic) French Equatorial Africa; Belgium: Belgian Congo | Germany: Kamerun | Allied victory: Kamerun divided into League of Nations mandates under British and French rule (1919) |
| First Battle of Garua part of the Kamerun campaign in World War I (1914) | British Empire: British Nigeria | (German Empire) Germany: German Kamerun | German victory |
| Battle of Gurin part of the Kamerun campaign in World War I (1915) | British Empire: British Nigeria | Germany: German Kamerun | British victory |
| Second Battle of Garua part of the Kamerun campaign in World War I (1915) | British Empire: British Nigeria; France: (French Third Republic) French Equatorial Africa | German Empire: German Kamerun | Allied victory |
| Bussa Rebellion part of World War I (1915) | Supporters of the Emir of Bussa | British Empire: British Nigeria | British victory |
| Adubi War (1918) | (United Kingdom of Great Britain and Ireland) British Empire: British Nigeria | Egba rebels | British victory |
| East African Campaign (World War II) part of the Mediterranean and Middle East theatre of the Second World War (1940–1943) | United Kingdom and Empire: India; South Africa; Kenya; Sudan; Nigeria; Gold Coast; Somaliland; Northern Rhodesia; Southern Rhodesia; Uganda; Nyasaland; Australia; New Zealand; (Ethiopian Empire) Ethiopian Arbegnoch; Belgium: Congo; Free France: Equatorial Africa | Italy: Italian East Africa | Allied victory: Dissolution of Italian East Africa (AOI) Eritrea, Somaliland and Ethiopia under British military administration |

== First Nigerian Republic (1960–1979) ==
| Conflict | Combatant 1 | Combatant 2 | Result |
|---|---|---|---|
| Congo Crisis part of the decolonisation of Africa and the Cold War (1960–1964) | 1960–1963: (Democratic Republic of the Congo) Republic of the Congo; Supported by: Soviet Union (1960); (United Nations) ONUC (Note: ONUC, the United Nations Operation in the Congo, included troops from Ghana, Tunisia, Morocco, Ethiopia, Ireland, Guinea, Sweden, Mali, Sudan, Liberia, Canada, India, Indonesia and the United Arab Republic among others.); Nigeria; 1963–1964: Democratic Republic of the Congo; United States; Belgium; Supported by: (United Nations) ONUC (1964); Nigeria | 1960–1963: Katanga; South Kasai; Supported by: Belgium (Note: The secession of Katanga and South Kasai was also supported by South Africa, France, Portuguese Angola and the neighbouring Central African Federation. However, neither was ever officially recognised by any state.); 1960–1962: (Democratic Republic of the Congo) Free Republic of the Congo; Supported by: Soviet Union; 1963–1964: Kwilu and Simba rebels; Supported by: Soviet Union; China; Cuba | Victory: The Congo established as an independent unitary state under the authoritarian presidency of Mobutu Sese Seko. |
| 1966 Nigerian coup d'état (1966) | Government of Nigeria | Rebel Army Officers | Coup failed but government was still overthrown: End of the First Nigerian Republic; Assassination of 11 senior politicians; Johnson Aguiyi-Ironsi seizes power; Coup conspirators arrested; Beginning of the Supreme Military Council of Nigeria (1966–1979); Beginning of the 1966 anti-Igbo pogrom; 1966 Nigerian counter-coup six months later |
| 1975 Nigerian coup d'état (1975) | (Nigeria) Military government: Supreme Military Council (SMC) | Armed Forces faction: Supreme Military Council (SMC) | Coup succeeds: Yakubu Gowon is ousted and replaced with Murtala Mohammed. |
| 1976 Nigerian coup d'état attempt (1976) | (Nigeria) Military government: Supreme Military Council (SMC) | Armed Forces faction | Coup fails: Murtala Mohammed is assassinated and succeeded by Olusegun Obasanjo. |

== Civil War (1967–1970) ==
| Conflict | Combatant 1 | Combatant 2 | Result |
|---|---|---|---|
| Nigerian Civil War part of the Cold War and the decolonisation of Africa (1967–1970) | Nigeria; Egypt (Note: Close air support); Supported by: United Kingdom; Soviet Union; Ethiopia | Biafra; Republic of Benin (in 1967); Supported by: China; Tanzania; Zambia; Gabon; Côte d'Ivoire; Covert support: France; Portugal; Israel; South Africa; Rhodesia | Nigerian victory: Dissolution of the Republic of Biafra |
| Operation UNICORD part of the Biafran War (1967) | Nigeria | Biafra | Nigerian victory |
| Midwest Invasion of 1967 part of the Biafran War (1967) | Nigeria | Biafra; Republic of Benin (September 19–20) | Nigerian victory |
| First Invasion of Onitsha part of the Biafran War (1967) | Nigeria | Biafra | Biafran victory |
| Operation Tiger Claw part of the Nigerian Civil War (1967) | Nigeria | Biafra | Nigerian victory |
| Fall of Enugu part of the Nigerian Civil War (1967) | Nigeria | Biafra | Nigerian victory |
| Second Invasion of Onitsha part of the Biafran War (1968) | Nigeria | Biafra | Nigerian victory |
| Abagana Ambush part of the Nigerian Civil War (1968) | Nigeria | Biafra | Decisive Biafran victory |
| Invasion of Port Harcourt part of the Biafran War (1968) | Nigeria | Biafra | Victory |
| Operation OAU part of the Biafran War (1968) | Nigeria | Biafra | Biafran victory |
| Operation Hiroshima part of the Biafran War (1968) | Nigeria | Biafra | Decisive Nigerian victory |
| Siege of Owerri part of the Nigerian Civil War (1968–1969) | Nigeria | Biafra | Biafran victory |
| Operation Leopard (1969) part of the Biafran War | Nigeria | Biafra | Victory |
| Invasion of Umuahia part of the Biafran War (1969) | Nigeria | Biafra | Victory |
| Operation Tail-Wind part of the Biafran War (1970) | Nigeria | Biafra | Decisive Nigerian victory: Capitulation of Biafra |

== Second Nigerian Republic (1977–1991) ==
| Conflict | Combatant 1 | Combatant 2 | Result |
|---|---|---|---|
| Shaba I part of the Shaba Invasions and the Cold War (1977) | Zaire; Morocco; Egypt; France; Belgium; Supported by: United States; Saudi Arabia; Sudan; Nigeria | Congolese National Liberation Front (FNLC) Supported by: Angola; Cuba; Soviet Union; East Germany | Zairian victory: FNLC expelled from Shaba |
| Chadian–Libyan conflict part of the Cold War and the Arab Cold War (1978-1987) | Anti-Libyan Chadian factions: FAT (1978–1979); FAN (1978–1983); FANT (1983–1987); GUNT (1986–1987); France; Inter-African Force: Zaire; Nigeria; Senegal; NFSL Supported by: DR Sudan (1978–1985); Sudan (1985–1987); Egypt (1977-1981); Israel; Iraq; Algeria (pre-reapproachment); United States | Libya: Islamic Legion; Pro-Libyan Chadian factions: FROLINAT; GUNT (1979–1986); Codos (1983–1986); FAP (1978–1986); Pro-Libyan Palestinian and Lebanese groups: PLO (1987); Abu Nidal Organization; Supported by: Algeria; East Germany; Soviet Union | Chadian and French victory: Chad regains control of the Aouzou Strip. |
| 1983 Nigerian coup d'état (1983) | Democratically elected Federal Government of Nigeria | Armed Forces faction | Coup succeeds: President Shehu Shagari is ousted by Maj-Gen Muhammadu Buhari, GOC 3rd Armored Division. |
| Chadian–Nigerian War (1983) | Nigeria | Chad | Nigerian victory |
| 1985 Nigerian coup d'état (1985) | Military government: Supreme Military Council (SMC) | Armed Forces faction: Armed Forces Ruling Council (AFRC) | Coup succeeds: Muhammadu Buhari is ousted by the Chief of Army Staff Ibrahim Babangida. |
| First Liberian Civil War part of the Liberian Civil Wars and spillover of the Sierra Leone Civil War (1990–1997) | (Liberia) Liberian government: (Liberia) Loyalist Armed Forces elements; (Liberia) ULIMO (1991–1994): (Liberia) ULIMO-K (1994–1996); (Liberia) ULIMO-J (1994–1996); (Liberia) LPC (1993–1996) (Liberia) LUDF (later becoming ULIMO) (Liberia) LDF (1993–1996); Supported by: ECOMOG: Nigeria (from 1990); Ghana (from 1990); Guinea (from 1990); The Gambia (from 1990); Sierra Leone (1990–1991); (United Nations) UNOMIL (1993–1997) | Anti-Doe Armed Forces elements (Liberia) NPFL (Liberia) INPFL (1989–1992) (Liberia) NPFL-CRC (1994–1996); Supported by: Libya; Burkina Faso; RUF | NPFL victory: Overthrow of the Doe government in 1990; Charles Taylor elected President of Liberia in 1997 |

== Third Nigerian Republic (1992–1999) ==
| Conflict | Combatant 1 | Combatant 2 | Result |
|---|---|---|---|
| Unified Task Force part of the Somali Civil War (1992–1993) | UNITAF: Australia; Bangladesh; Belgium; Botswana; Canada; Egypt; Ethiopia; France; Germany; Greece; India; Indonesia; Italy; Kuwait; Malaysia; Morocco; New Zealand; Nigeria; Norway; Pakistan; Saudi Arabia; Spain; Tunisia; Turkey; UAE; United Kingdom; United States; Zimbabwe | Somali National Alliance; Al-Itihaad al-Islamiya | Operational success: Transition to UNOSOM II |
| Sierra Leone Civil War part of the spillover of the First and Second Liberian Civil Wars (1991–2002) | Sierra Leone; SLA (before and after the AFRC); CDF (Kamajors, Tamaboros, Kapras, etc.); Foreign mercenaries; United Kingdom (2000–2002); Guinea; ECOMOG forces (1998–2000); Executive Outcomes (1995–1996); Supported by: United States; Belarus; (United Nations) UNAMSIL; Bangladesh; India; Pakistan (2001–2005); Kenya; Russia (1999–2005); Ukraine (1999–2005); Nigeria; Norway; New Zealand; Ghana; Jordan; Germany | RUF; (Sierra Leone) AFRC (1997–2002); West Side Boys (1998–2000); Liberia (1997–2002); NPFL (1991–2002); Foreign mercenaries; Supported by: Libya; Burkina Faso | Commonwealth victory |
| 1998 Monrovia clashes part of the aftermath of the First Liberian Civil War (1998) | (Liberia) Johnson's forces (ex-ULIMO-J); Limited involvement: Nigeria; United States | (Liberia) Liberian government (Taylor loyalists) | Partial victory of Charles Taylor: Monrovia purged of Roosevelt Johnson's followers; Mass killings of Krahn, which contribute to the Second Liberian Civil War's outbreak |

== Fourth Nigerian Republic (1999–present) ==
| Conflict | Combatant 1 | Combatant 2 | Result |
|---|---|---|---|
| Conflict in the Niger Delta (2003–present) | Nigerian government: Niger Delta Revolutionary Crusaders (since 2019); Nigerian Armed Forces; List: Abia State; Akwa Ibom State; Bayelsa State; Cross River State; Delta State; Edo State; Imo State; Ondo State; Rivers State; supported by: Belarus | Niger Delta Republic: Niger Delta Avengers (2016–present); Niger Delta Greenland Justice Mandate (2016–present); Joint Niger Delta Liberation Force (2016–present); Niger Delta Red Squad (2016–present); Adaka Boro Avengers (2016–present); Asawana Deadly Force of Niger Delta (2016–present); Niger Delta Revolutionary Crusaders (2016–present); New Delta Avengers (2017–present); Niger Delta Marine Force (2017–present); Reformed Egbesu Fraternities: Red Egbesu Water Lions (2016–present); Reformed Egbesu Boys of the Niger Delta (2016–present); Egbesu Mightier Fraternity (2016–present); (Republic of Biafra) Biafran separatists (from 2021): Movement for the Emancipation of the Niger Delta (2004–14); Niger Delta People's Volunteer Force (2003–09); Niger Delta Liberation Front (2005–14); Joint Revolutionary Council (2004–14); Niger Delta Vigilante (2004–09); Supported by: (Republic of Biafra) IPOB elements Bandits Pirates Nigerian mafia: Black Axe; The Outlaws; Eiye | Ongoing: ~15,000 militants signed for presidential amnesty program |
| Operation Juniper Shield part of the Global War on Terrorism (Islamist insurgency in the Sahel) (2007–present) | Algeria; Morocco; Mauritania; Tunisia; Burkina Faso; Chad; Mali; Niger; Nigeria; Senegal; Cameroon; Togo; Ghana; Ivory Coast; Benin; Cape Verde (The Gambia) Gambia; Guinea; Guinea-Bissau; Liberia; Sierra Leone Multi-national coalitions: (United Nations) MINUSMA (until 2023); AFISMA (from 2013); (European Union) EUTM Mali (from 2024); Supported and trained by: United States; Canada; France; Germany; Netherlands; Spain; United Kingdom; Denmark; Czech Republic; Sweden; Portugal; Russia; Turkey | Islamic militants; al-Qaeda; Jama'at Nasr al-Islam wal Muslimin; MOJWA (until 2013); AQIM; Al-Mourabitoun (until 2017); Ansar al-Sharia; Macina Liberation Front; Ansar Dine (until 2017); Boko Haram (partially aligned with ISIL since 2015); Ansaru; ISIL; Islamic State in the Greater Sahara (2015–present); Islamic State – West Africa Province | Ongoing |
| Somali Civil War part of the Somali Civil War, conflicts in the Horn of Africa, the Ethiopian–Somali conflict, war against the Islamic State, Operation Enduring Freedom – Horn of Africa, and global war on terrorism (2009–present) | Somalia; Somali Armed Forces; Regional forces: Galmudug; Galmudug Security Force; Ahlu Sunna Waljama'a (until 2018); (Somalia) Ma'awisley; Hirshabelle; Khatumo; Southwestern Somalia; Himan and Heeb (until 2015); United States: U.S. Army; U.S. Marine Corps; U.S. Air Force; U.S. Navy; CIA; AFRICOM; China: People's Armed Police; AUSSOM (2025–present): Burundi (under discussion); Djibouti; Egypt (under discussion); Ethiopia; Kenya; Uganda; ATMIS (2022–2024): Burundi; Djibouti; Ethiopia; Kenya; Uganda; AMISOM (2007–2022): Burundi; Djibouti; Ethiopia; Ghana; Kenya; Nigeria; Sierra Leone; Uganda; Supported by: France; Italy; Russia; Turkey; UAE; United Kingdom Non-combat support: European Union; EUTM Somalia; (United Nations) UNPOS (1995–2013) (United Nations) UNSOM (2013–2024): Brazil; Finland; Germany; Ghana; India; Indonesia; Nepal; Sierra Leone; Sweden; Thailand; Turkey; Uganda; United Kingdom; Zimbabwe; (United Nations) UNTMIS (2025–present) (United Nations) UNSOA (2009–2016) (United Nations) UNSOS (2016–present) Independent regional forces Puntland: Puntland Security Force; Puntland Dervish Force; Puntland Maritime Police Force; Jubaland: Jubaland Dervish Force; Raskamboni Movement | Al-Qaeda and allies; Al-Shabaab; AQAP; AQIM; Hizbul Islam (until 2010; 2012–2013) Alleged state allies: Eritrea; Iran; Quds Force; Qatar; Alleged non-state allies: Houthis; Somali pirates: Islamic State (since 2015); Somalia Wilayah; Allies; IS-YP; Somali pirates: Somaliland; Somaliland Armed Forces; SSB; Alleged support: Ethiopia; United Arab Emirates | Ongoing: Merger and split between/of Hizbul Islam and al-Shabaab forces; Kenyan military intervention in October 2011; Al-Shabaab becomes an official al-Qaeda affiliate in February 2012; Federal Government formed in August 2012; Formation of the Islamic State in Somalia in October 2015; Somali government launches a major offensive in August 2022, and takes at least a third of al-Shabaab territory; Las Anod conflict between Somaliland and SSC-Khatumo begins in 2023; Ongoing constitutional crisis in Somalia since 2023, Puntland withdrew its recognition of the Federal Government and declared itself a de facto independent state. Jubaland crisis ongoing since 11 December 2024 |
| Boko Haram insurgency part of the religious violence in Nigeria, the war against the Islamic State, the Islamist insurgency in the Sahel, and the war on terror (2009–present) | Nigeria: Multinational Joint Task Force; Local militias and vigilantes; Foreign mercenaries; Sultan Murad Division (from 2024); Supported by: United States; Russia; China; France; United Kingdom; African Union; Turkey; Pakistan; Canada; Egypt; Israel; European Union; Colombia; Belarus | Islamic State (2015-Present); (Islamic State) ISWA (2015-2016); (Islamic State) ISWAP (from 2016, originally Barnawi faction of Boko Haram); (Islamic State) ISSP; Lakurawa (2016-present); al-Qaeda; Ansaru (2012-present) (Note: The exact origin of Ansaru is unclear, but it had already existed as Boko Haram faction before officially announcing its foundation as separate group on 1 January 2012. The group had no known military presence in Nigeria from 2015, but several of its members appear to be still active. The group appear allied with rag-tag factions in the Nigerian bandit conflict and were recently behind the Abuja–Kaduna train attack); Supported by: Al-Shabaab; AQIM; (Islamic State) Boko Haram (2009-2015, 2016-) (Note: Following Mohammed Yusuf's death, Boko Haram splintered into numerous factions which no longer operated under a unified leadership. Though Abubakar Shekau eventually became the preeminent commander of the movement, he never really controlled all Boko Haram groups. Instead, the factions were loosely allied, but also occasionally clashed with each other. This situation changed in 2015 when Shekau pledged allegiance to ISIL. The leadership of ISIL eventually decided to replace Shekau as a local commander with Yusuf's son Abu Musab al-Barnawi, whereupon the movement split completely. Shekau no longer recognized the authority of ISIL's central command, and his loyalists started to openly fight the followers of al-Barnawi. Regardless, Shekau did never officially renounce his pledge of allegiance to ISIL as a whole; his forces are thus occasionally regarded as "second branch of ISWAP". Overall, the relation of Shekau with ISIL remains confused and ambiguous. In the Battle of Sambisa Forest of 2021 ISWAP fighters killed Shekau and al-Barnawi nominally remains head of ISWAP); Shekau faction; Several minor factions | Ongoing (Map of the current military situation): Expansion of conflict into neighboring Cameroon, Chad, Mali, and Niger; Turkish forces and Syrian mercenaries deployed to Niger; Coalition offensive in 2015 forces Boko Haram to retreat into the Sambisa Forest; Abubakar Shekau killed on 19 May 2021 amid ISWAP's capture of Sambisa Forest; Boko Haram largely dissolves and rise of ISWAP |
| 2009 Boko Haram uprising part of the Boko Haram insurgency (2009) | Nigerian Government | Boko Haram | Violence quelled |
| Nigerian bandit conflict part of the Herder–farmer conflicts in Nigeria (2011–present) | Nigeria: Nigeria Police Force; Nigerian Armed Forces; Nigerian Army; Nigerian Air Force; Vigilante groups: Vigilante Group of Nigeria; Lakurawa (2016/2018-2023) | Various bandit groups: Hausa militias; Moriki vigilantes group; Fulani militias; Ali Kachalla bandit group; Dogo Giɗe bandit group; Kachalla Halilu Sububu Seno bandit group; Adamu Aliero Yankuzo bandit group; Bello Turji Kachalla bandit gang; Dan Karami bandit gang; Kachalla Turji bandit gang; Kachalla Halilu Sububu Seno bandit gang; Islamist rebels: Islamic State: ISWAP; Boko Haram; Ansaru; Lakurawa (from c. 2023) | Ongoing |
| War in the Sahel part of the war on terror, spillover of the Insurgency in the Maghreb (2002–present) and the War against the Islamic State (2012 (Note: While conflicts like the AQIM insurgency and Tuareg rebellions were ongoing up until the start of the 2012 Tuareg rebellion, the conflict that would devolve into the war in the Sahel didn't start until January 2012.)–Present) | Alliance of Sahel States: Mali; Niger; Burkina Faso; Benin; Togo (Note: JNIM has had a small presence in northern Togo since 2021, with several attacks carried out since then.); Ivory Coast (Note: Jihadist groups have little to no presence on Ivorian soil, but have occasionally launched attacks along the Burkinabe-Ivorian border since 2019. AQIM attacked Grand-Bassam in 2016 as well.); Algeria (Note: No jihadist groups are active on Algerian soil, although the country has been attacked several times in the early days of the Mali War by jihadist groups. Currently, diplomatic relations between the AES states and Algeria are bad due to Algeria allowing FLA rebels on their soil.); Mauritania (Note: The Mauritanian government currently has a non-aggression pact with JNIM-aligned jihadists, and has not had an attack by jihadist groups on its soil since 2011. Small JNIM cells are present along the Malian border.) Nigeria Supported by: Africa Corps (since 2021) (Note: Previously Wagner Group, since renamed Africa Corps and absorbed by Russian government.); Turkey (since 2022); France (2013–2023); United States (until 2024); MINUSMA (2013–2023) (Note: For full list of MINUSMA combatants, see here); AFISMA (2012–2013); G5 Sahel (until 2023) | Al-Qaeda; Jama'at Nasr al-Islam wal Muslimin; Nigerian Brigade; Ansarul Islam; Boko Haram; Islamic State; Islamic State - Sahel Province; Lakurawa (2023-present); Katibat Salaheddin (2017 – 2018); Islamic State - West Africa Province; Azawad Liberation Front Nigerien anti-coup movement: Patriotic Front for Justice; Free Armed Forces; Former belligerents: CSP-PSD (2023-2024); Coordination of Azawad Movements (2014–2021, 2023–2024); MNLA (2012–2024); HCUA (2013–2024); MAA (2012–2024) GATIA (al-Mahmoud faction) (2023–2024) (Note: Faction affiliated with the CSP-PSD) Patriotic Liberation Front (2023–2024) | Ongoing: Mali War: Tuareg rebels and allied Islamists overrun Northern Mali in 2012 until pushed back by a French intervention; Islamist insurgency in Burkina Faso: Mali War spills over into Burkina Faso by 2015 as Islamists capture about 40% of Burkinabé territory; Islamist insurgency in Niger; Boko Haram insurgency arises and extends in Chad, Niger, and Cameroon; French and American intervention on behalf of governments; Al-Qaeda–Islamic State conflict and the JNIM-ISGS war; Jihadist insurgency in Northern Benin; Rise of the coup belt |
| Operation Serval part of the Mali War and the Islamist insurgency in the Sahel (2013–2014) | France; Mali; Chad; Nigeria; Burkina Faso; Senegal; Togo (Azawad) MNLA (latter part of conflict); AFISMA; Supported by: Belgium; Canada; Denmark; Germany; Netherlands; Spain; Sweden; Poland; Australia; United Arab Emirates; United Kingdom; United States | Islamic militants: MOJWA; AQIM; Ansar Dine; Boko Haram; Ansaru | Malian/French victory: All major cities controlled by French and Malian troops.; France launched Operation Barkhane on 1 August 2014. |
| Chibok ambush part of the Boko Haram insurgency (2014) | Nigeria | Boko Haram | Boko Haram victory: Mutiny of Nigerian Army soldiers at Maiduguri |
| 2015 West African offensive part of the Boko Haram insurgency (2015): 30 June and 1 July 2015 Borno massacres | Multinational Joint Task Force: Nigeria; Cameroon; Chad; Niger; Local militias STTEP (foreign mercenaries) | (Islamic State) Boko Haram (until March 2015) (Islamic State) ISIL: (Islamic State) Wilayat Gharb Afriqiya (from March 2015) | Multinational Joint Task Force victory |
| ECOWAS military intervention in the Gambia part of the 2016–2017 Gambian constitutional crisis (first three days of the intervention) (2017-Present): Dalori attack | ECOWAS forces: Senegal; Nigeria; Ghana; Mali (until 2020); Togo; Pro-Barrow forces; Supporters of Coalition 2016; Gambian Navy | Pro-Jammeh forces: Supporters of the Alliance for Patriotic Reorientation and Construction; MFDC; Foreign mercenaries; Protestors against continued ECOWAS presence | Ongoing: Amidst the Gambian constitutional crisis, ECOWAS intervenes in the country militarily (at the request of Adama Barrow) without resistance from pro-Jammeh forces.; Jammeh leaves the country as forces approach Banjul, and Barrow arrives as President days later.; 2,500 ECOWAS troops remain in The Gambia.; Clash between ECOWAS forces and alleged Pro-Jammeh elements in The Gambian military in April 2017.; Protests against continued presence of ECOWAS forces.; Clash between ECOWAS forces and MFDC Senegalese rebels on the Gambia-Senegal border in January 2022. |
| Chad Basin campaign (2018–2020) part of the Boko Haram insurgency | Multinational Joint Task Force (MJTF): Nigeria; Niger; Cameroon; Chad; Self-defense militias | Islamic State: West Africa Province (ISWAP); Boko Haram | Partial Multinational Joint Task Force victory: Much territory is retaken from rebel forces; Insurgents retain significant presence in the Chad Basin; ISWAP experiences extensive leadership struggles, resulting in the successive purges of two leaders and several sub-commanders |
| Insurgency in Southeastern Nigeria part of the herder–farmer conflicts in Nigeria and the conflict in the Niger Delta (2021–present) | Nigeria Spillover into Bakassi: Cameroon | (Republic of Biafra) Biafran separatists Oduduwa separatists (only against Fulani herders) | Ongoing: IPOB declared on 19 February that a state of war existed; Ban of Twitter in Nigeria from 5 June 2021; Nnamdi Kanu arrested by Interpol on 27 June 2021; Biafran separatists control about 700 hectares in southeastern Nigeria by mid-2024 |
| Anambra Ambush part of the insurgency in Southeastern Nigeria (2023) | United States; Nigeria | (Republic of Biafra) Biafran separatists (suspected) | Suspected Biafra separatists victory: Ambush Successful |
| Nigerien crisis (2023–2024) part of the aftermath of the 2023 Nigerien coup d'état | Pro-Bazoum factions; Pro-Bazoum Cabinet of Niger; PNDS-Tarayya; CRR; ECOWAS (Note: Niger, Burkina Faso, Mali, and Guinea are members of ECOWAS that were suspended following coup d'états which established military juntas in their respective countries.); Benin; Cape Verde (Note: Cape Verde is opposed to military intervention in Niger, instead advocating for a diplomatic solution.); The Gambia; Ghana; Guinea-Bissau; Ivory Coast; Liberia; Nigeria; Senegal; Sierra Leone; Togo; African Union; Supported by: France; United Kingdom; United States; United Nations; European Union | Pro-Tiani factions; CNSP; M62 Movement; VDN; Pro-Tiani Cabinet of Niger; Alliance of Sahel States; Niger; Burkina Faso; Mali; Supported by: Guinea; Russia; Wagner Group (alleged) | ECOWAS takes no military action: ECOWAS ultimatum to return to civilian rule expires on 6 August; ECOWAS authorizes military intervention in Niger on 10 August; ECOWAS lifts its sanctions on Niger on 24 February 2024; Niger suspended from African Union and leaves ECOWAS; Niger becomes a founding member of the Alliance of Sahel States; End of U.S. and French military intervention in Niger; President Bazoum remains in house arrest |

== Peace agreements ==
=== Peace agreements signed ===
- Banjul III Agreement (1990-10-24)
- Bamako Ceasefire Agreement (1990-11-28)
- Banjul IV Agreement (1990-12-21)
- Lomé Agreement (1991-02-13)
- Yamoussoukro IV Peace Agreement (1991-10-30)
- Geneva Agreement 1992 (1992-04-07)
- Cotonou Peace Agreement (1993-07-25)
- Akosombo Peace Agreement (1994-09-12)
- Accra Agreements/Akosombo clarification agreement (1994-12-21)
- Abuja Peace Agreement (1995-08-19)

== See also ==
- Insurgency in the Maghreb (2002–present)
