= Ejike Obumneme Aghanya =

Nigerian military officer and electrical engineer (1932–2020)

Colonel Ejike Ebenezer Obumneme Aghanya
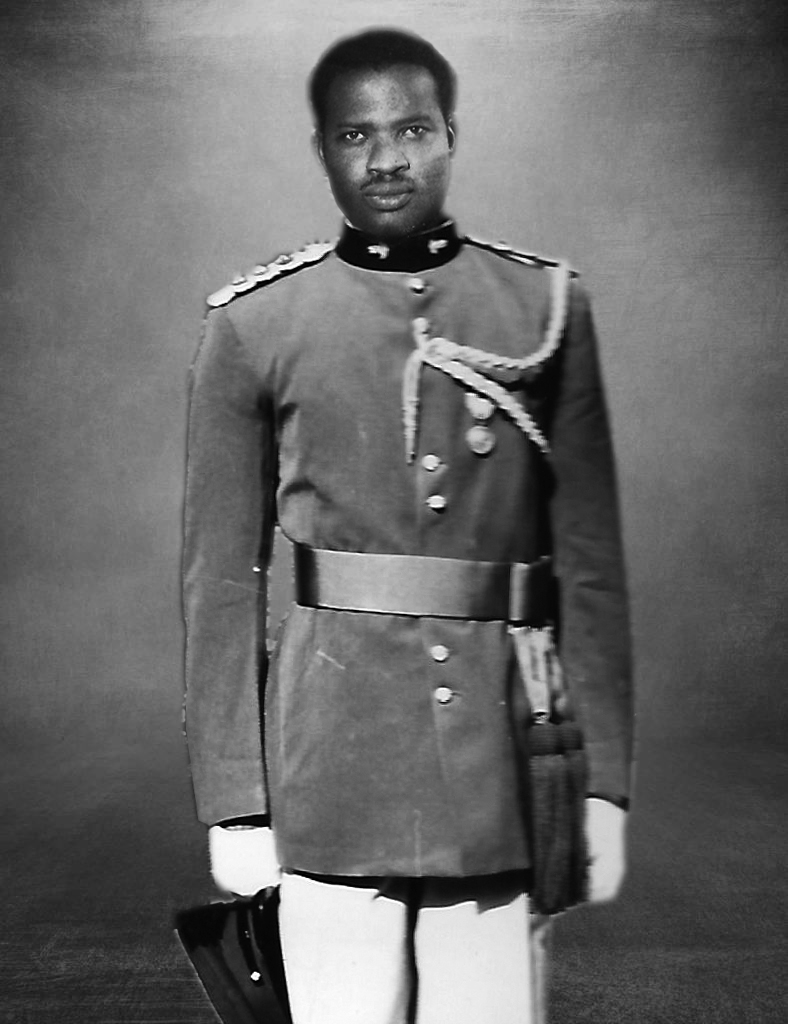
- Born: 27 November 1932; Amawbia, Anambra State, Colony and Protectorate of Nigeria
- Died: 3 July 2020 (aged 87); Atlanta, Georgia, U.S.
- Education: Royal Electrical and Mechanical Engineers
- Spouse: Comfort Ifeoma Aghanya
- Military career
- Allegiance: Nigeria; Biafra
- Branch: Nigerian Army; Biafran Armed Forces
- Service years: 1963–1970
- Rank: Major (Nigerian Army); Colonel (Biafran Armed Forces)
- Service number: N/349
- Commands: Commanding officer, Nigerian Army Electrical and Mechanical Engineers (NAEME) Kaduna; Commanding Officer, Nigerian Army Electrical and Mechanical Engineers (NAEME) Army Headquarters Lagos; Battalion Commander, 44th Electrical and Mechanical Engineer Battalion Biafran Army; Commanding Officer, Research and Production Agency (RAP); Brigade Commander, 58th Brigade of 12th Division Biafran Army; Chief of Staff, Biafran Organisation of Freedom Fighters (BOFF)
- Conflicts: First Invasion of Onitsha; Siege of Owerri; Second Invasion of Onitsha; Fall of Enugu; Operation OAU; Operation Tail-Wind
- Other work: Fellow Nigerian Society of Engineers (F.N.S.E.)

Ejike Ebenezer Obumneme Aghanya (27 November 1932 – 3 July 2020) was a military officer and electrical engineer who served in the Nigerian Army and the Biafran Armed Forces, retiring as a colonel. Accused of involvement in the 1966 Nigerian coup d'état he was arrested and imprisoned without trial until the outbreak of the Nigerian Civil War where he served on the side of Biafra, holding key positions in the Biafran Armed Forces. He was the head of the Biafran Agency for Research and Production (RAP) which produced bombs, rockets, missiles (collectively called Ogbunigwe), as well as ammunition, armored vehicles, telecommunication gadgets and petroleum refineries among others for the Biafran Armed Forces. Later he was the chief of staff of the Biafran Organisation of Freedom Fighters (BOFF), which was the guerrilla warfare and special operations arm of the Biafran Armed Forces. He also served as battalion commander, 44th Electrical and Mechanical Engineer Battalion Biafran Army and later brigade commander of the 58th Brigade of 12th Infantry Division Biafran Army during the war.

== Education ==
Aghanya received his primary education at St Cyprian primary school Port Harcourt after which he attended Okrika Grammar School Okrika, Nigeria graduating in 1953. His first degree was in electrical engineering from Yaba College of Technology in 1957. He went for postgraduate studies at the London Polytechnic, later transferring to the Southampton College of Technology graduating in electrical and electronic engineering in 1960. He then joined the Nigerian Broadcasting Service where he became the president of the Nigerian Broadcasting Service Staff Union.

== Military career ==
In 1962 Aghanya was seconded to the Nigerian Army. He received basic infantry training in the Nigerian Military Training College (NMTC) Kaduna and further attended officers course and special training at the School of Royal Electrical and Mechanical Engineers (REME) under Major General Denis Redman at Arborfield Garrison, United Kingdom from 1962 to 1963. He was commissioned into the Nigerian Army on 2 March 1963 with service number N/349 and the rank of captain. He served as commanding officer Nigerian Army Electrical and Mechanical Engineers (NAEME) Kaduna from 1963 to 1964. in 1964 he was promoted to major and served as commanding officer Nigerian Army Electrical and Mechanical Engineers (NAEME) Army Headquarters Lagos becoming the first Nigerian to hold the command, taking over from the last British commanding officer Major Whittle.

In the aftermath of the 1966 Nigerian coup d'état, Aghanya was arrested on 18 January 1966 and together with Lieutenant Colonel Victor Banjo accused of plotting to assassinate the military head of state Major General Johnson Aguiyi-Ironsi. Aghanya was detained without trial at the Kirikiri Maximum Security Prison with others purportedly involved in the coup d'état. He was later transferred to Enugu and subsequently Abakaliki prisons. In retrospect, those actively involved in the planning and execution of the coup such as Major Adewale Ademoyega have attested to the innocence of both Aghanya and Banjo in their memoirs. After the 1966 Nigerian counter-coup in which Aguyi Ironsi was murdered, Aghanya was released from prison in March 1967 at the orders of the then governor of the Eastern Region, Colonel (later General) Odumegwu Ojukwu, defying the orders of new head of state Colonel (later General) Yakubu Gowon. In response Gowon announced the release of Aghanya and others after the fact.

=== Research and Production (RAP) ===
At the outbreak of hostilities in July 1967 that marked the beginning of the Nigerian Biafran war, Aghanya was commissioned into the Biafran Army with the rank of colonel and appointed commanding officer of the 44th Electrical and Mechanical Engineer Battalion Biafran Army by the then chief of staff Biafran Army, Brigadier Hillary Njoku. A few weeks into the conflict he was further appointed as head of the Biafran Agency for Research and Production (RAP) by General Ojukwu. In this position Aghanya was in charge of coordinating Biafran scientists, engineers and raw materials in a concerted effort at boosting the industrial production of war relevant materials for the Biafran government. Under his leadership, various scientific work groups were created to achieve specific goals. Priorities were weapons, ammunition and fuel. To this end he set up and supervised among others:

"The Anti-aircraft Rocket (Piom-Piom) Group headed by Engineer Seth Nwanagu; the Fuel or Petroleum Groups headed by Dr. Ogbuehi, Engineer Onyenso and Engineer Iteke; ‘Ogbunigwe’ Groups headed by Engineer Willy Achukwu, Engineer Austin Odiwe, Engineer Roy Umenyi, Engineer E. Kaine, Dr. Felix Oragwu; the Biological Groups headed by Prof. Njoku-Obi and Dr. Okafor; the Armoured Vehicle Groups headed by Engr. Iwobi and Engineer Dike; the Anti-tank war-head and Rocket Groups headed by Prof. Ezilo, Prof. Ezekwe, Dr. Felix Oragwu, Engineer Kaine, Capt. Ohaya etc; the food Preservation Groups headed by Prof. Njoku-Obi, Dr. Ene, etc; the Rocket-fuel Group headed by Dr. Akalonu (from America); the Hand-grenade Groups headed by Mr. B. Nwogbo and Engineer Okafor of Dockyard, Port Harcourt; the Salt Groups headed by Prof. Agu Ogan, Dr. Obasi and Mr. Ekechukwu; the Matches and Candle Groups headed by Dr. Osisiogu, Dr. Caleb Wakama; the Vehicles Repair, Modification and Renovation Group headed by Engineer Roy Umenyi, Engineer Onwubualili, Engineer Capt. Ohaya. The Telecommunication Equipment Modification Group, was headed by Prof. Chijioke. The Battery Reconditioning and Reproduction Group was headed by Dr. Mike Nwachukwu. The Finance and General Administration Group was headed by Dr. B.C. Nwosu."

Aghanya was in charge of supervising the various scientific groups he set up, sourcing and supply of raw materials needed for production as well as distribution of finished products to the troops. He was further in charge of testing prototypes, as well as training the troops in the use of the various home made weapons, bombs, grenades and missiles. To this end he created various Ogbunigwe squads which were distributed in fire brigade style to the various war fronts as the need arose. Initially posted to Bonny to help defend Port Harcourt from the advances of Benjamin Adekunle`s 3rd Marine Commando division with his Biafra made mines, shore batteries and missiles, he was later deployed with his Ogbunigwe troops to Onitsha by General Ojukwu to defend that city against attacks from Murtala Mohammed´s Second Division. Aghanya played a major role in the defense of Onitsha. Aghanya and his Ogbunigwe troops also played major roles in the defense of the towns of Aba, Ikot Ekpene, Umuahia and Owerri.

=== Biafran Organisation of Freedom Fighters (BOFF) ===
After the fall of some major Biafran enclaves such as Enugu, Abakaliki, Calabar, Ikot-Ekpene and Port Harcourt, it became increasingly obvious that Biafra could not adequately defend herself using only conventional troops. Aghanya therefore approached General Ojukwu and the new Biafran Army Chief of Staff, Major General Madiebo, with the proposal of setting up a guerrilla force in divisional strength, which was to operate behind enemy lines especially in the areas of Biafra occupied by Nigerian troops. The force was to be made up of civilians, including women, who after having been trained in sabotage and the use of RAP made explosive gadgets would infiltrate behind enemy lines. Aghanya was given the assignment of setting up, equipping and training the guerrilla force which was named Biafran Organisation of Freedom Fighters (BOFF). Also called "Rangers", the idea behind this division was partly inspired and loosely based on the Viet Cong role model. He got a team of South African instructors under Colonel Jan Breytenbach to train the BOFF troops in sabotage and counterinsurgency. Aghanya was made the commanding officer of this new branch of the armed forces with title of chief of staff. Members of his staff included Chinua Achebe, Ukwu I. Ukwu and Okonjo (father to Ngozi Okonjo-Iweala) The headquarters of the BOFF Division was located at Umuahia.

Regarding aims, objectives and modus operandi of BOFF, Ezenwa-Ohaeto quotes Aghanya as follows:

"The Biafrans did not have the fire power that could match the fire power of the other side, so it became necessary for us to plan and formulate our battles in terms of defence warfare. All the people who were thinking alike wanted to form an organisation that would achieve these aims. The primary aim was to drive the enemy out of the land of Biafra and not to capture strange lands. The organisation was to involve fellow Biafrans in captured areas to help in driving the enemy out. Since the regular army was there, there was the need to demarcate areas of operation. The regular army operated in front while the BOFF operated behind enemy lines. The aim was that as the regular army became weaker then the Freedom Fighters would become stronger."

BOFF was the most important fighting force in Biafra aside from the regular army. In April 1968 they achieved a brief but spectacular feat by recapturing Asaba from the Nigerian Army Second Division, blocking off direct supply across the Niger River. They also prevented the Nigerian Army Second Division from linking up with the First Division Headquartered at Enugu by effectively blocking the Onitsha-Enugu road until the end of the war. By September 1968 they were operating extensively behind enemy lines, in the Mid-Western region and other areas of occupied Biafra. By June 1969, Biafran guerrilla operations were so extensive in the Mid West that six Nigerian Army Battalions had to be deployed to the area in an attempt to check the menace. The BOFF under Aghanya also played a major role in the recapture of Owerri in 1969.

== Private life ==
Aghanya was married to Comfort Ifeoma Modebelu on 19 May 1962 in Birmingham, United Kingdom. He was a fellow, and founding member of the Nigerian Society of Engineers, the Council of Registered Engineers of Nigeria, and the British Institution of Electronic and Radio Engineers. After the war, Aghanya established his private engineering company called NICON Engineering Company and was the first to have indigenously designed, patented and produced traffic lights in Nigeria. He was a member of the Igbo Traditional Chieftaincy Title Holders Association Nze na Ozo holding the title Ochiagha-Udo na Amawbia, a founding member of Ohanaeze Ndigbo, and a founding member of the Peoples Democratic Party (PDP).
