= Ogbugo Kalu =

Nigerian military officer

Chief/Colonel Ogbugo Kalu
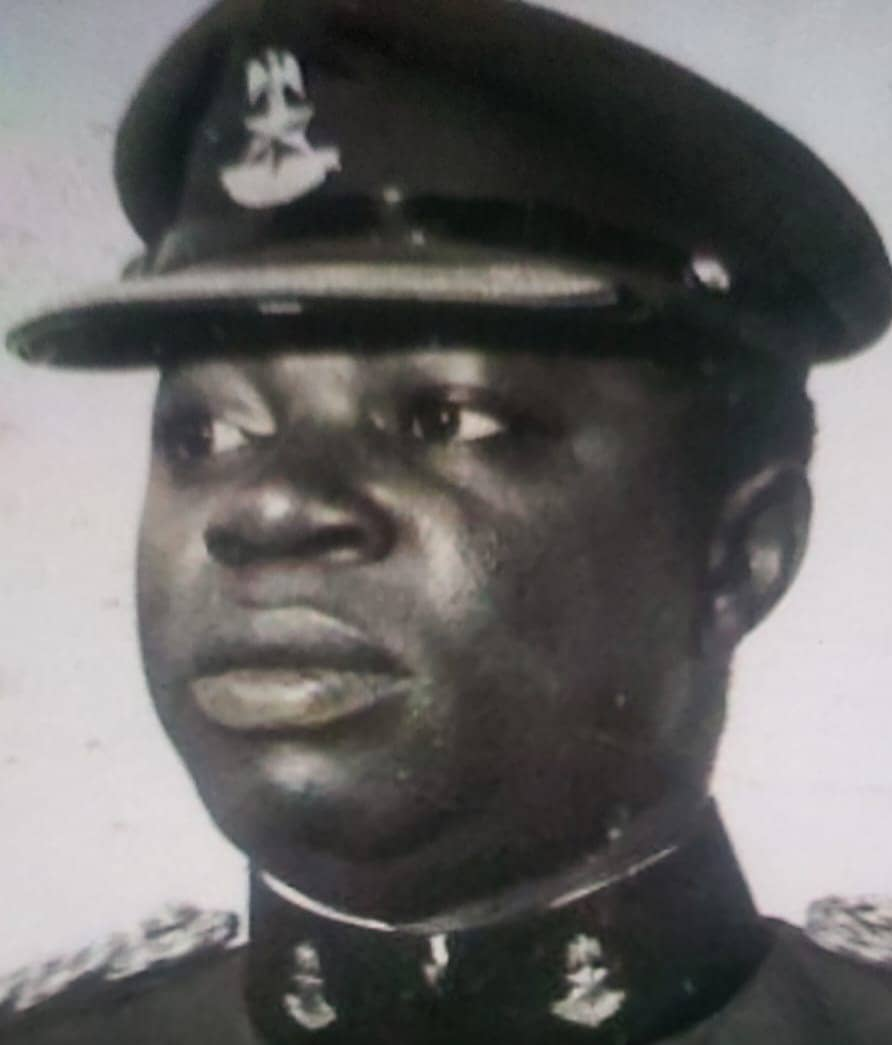
- Born: 18 November 1935 (official); Ohafia, British Nigeria
- Died: February 2004; Ohafia, Abia State
- Burial place: Ebem-Ohafia
- Military career
- Allegiance: Nigeria (1958-1967); Biafra (1967-1970)
- Service years: 1958-1967 (Nigerian Army); 1967-1970 (Biafran Army)
- Rank: Second Lieutenant (Nigerian Army) 1959-early 1960s Major (Nigerian Army) early 1960s-1966 Lieutenant Colonel (Nigerian Army) 1966-1967; Lieutenant Colonel (Biafran Army) 1967-68; Colonel (Biafran Army) 1968-69; Brigadier (Biafran Army) 1969-1970
- Commands: Biafran 8th Battalion; Biafran 52nd Brigade; Biafran 63rd Brigade; Biafran 14th Division
- Conflicts: Nigerian Civil War; Invasion of Port Harcourt; Operation OAU; Siege of Owerri; Operation Tail-Wind

Ogbugo Kalu (died February 2004) was a Nigerian military officer who served in the Nigerian Army and later the Biafran Army during the Nigerian Civil War. Kalu was also commander of the Nigerian Military Training College (NMTC) in Kaduna following the 1966 Nigerian coup d'état.

== Nigerian Army career ==
Prior to Kalu's celebrated career as an officer in the Biafran Army, he had been serving in the Nigerian Army since 1958. After being given formal military training in both Ghana and the United Kingdom, Kalu was short service commissioned a Second Lieutenant in November 1959. He was later promoted to the rank of Major sometime during the first half of the 1960s.

On the night of January 15, 1966, a coup d'état was set in motion by 9 Igbo and 1 Yoruba army officers, but was short-lived and quelled within 48 hours by the Igbo Gen. Johnson Aguiyi-Ironsi who then assumed total leadership over Nigeria. Gen. Ironsi appointed Maj. Kalu commandant of the Nigerian Military Training College in Kaduna due to the fact that its incumbent commander, Col. Ralph Shodeinde, was assassinated by a detachment of mutinous soldiers led by Maj. Timothy Onwuatuegwu on the night of the coup. He was appointed Lieutenant Colonel in May 1966.

On July 29, 1966, a second coup d'état took place after a majority of the Nigerian Army led by 32 army officers rose up against Ironsi's dictatorship and assassinated him along with several other Igbo officers and politicians. Kalu hosted an early afternoon meeting at his house in Kaduna where he informed several south-eastern officers about the coup and that their lives were in danger, these officers included Lt. Col. Alexander Madiebo, Maj. Christopher Emelifonwu, Maj. Ayodele Ogunro, and Maj. Samuel Ogbemudia. After hearing that both Maj. Emelifonwu and Maj. Ogunro were murdered by Hausa-Fulani soldiers in Kaduna, Lt. Col. Kalu made his way to a railroad depot where he managed to stow away inside the water-tank of a train destined for south-eastern Nigeria.

== Biafra ==
In February 1967 the Eastern Region government under Odumegwu Ojukwu was becoming concerned about the constant confrontations Igbo civilians were having with rival ethnic groups, mainly the Hausa-Fulani population, and decided to form two infantry battalions that wouldn't be under the control of the Nigerian government, these would later become the Biafran 7th and 8th Battalions. Lt. Col. Kalu was asked to command the 8th Battalion, based in Port Harcourt, while Lt. Col. Alexander Madiebo was asked to command the 7th Battalion, based in Nsukka. When Nigeria declared war on Biafra on July 6, 1967, the 8th Battalion became responsible for defending Ahoada, Calabar, Oron, and Bonny. The Biafran 52nd Brigade, consisting of Kalu's 8th Battalion and the 9th Battalion under Maj. Ogbo Oji, was created shortly after the outbreak of the war and placed under the command of Col. Anthony Eze. Kalu was given command of the 52nd Brigade by President Ojukwu after the Nigerian 3rd Marine Division under Gen. Benjamin Adekunle seized Bonny with little resistance in July 1967. Kalu led a campaign against the Nigerian 15th Brigade under Lt. Col. Ipoola Alani Akinrinade, stationed in Bonny, in December 1967-January 1968. The 52nd Brigade nearly re-captured Bonny from the Nigerians, but, reinforcements arrived from Lagos in time to save the 15th Brigade.

Again, in late March and early April, after a series of reversals, Kalu blocked the first major attempt by Adekunle to take Port Harcourt through Onne. Lt. Col. Akinrinade's Nigerian 15th Brigade was practically wiped out after the Biafran 52nd Brigade launched an offensive against the Nigerian positions surrounding Port Harcourt. The only survivors were "Ijaw swimmers" who knew how to disappear into the creeks. Kalu ordered his men to halt the offensive once the Nigerians had been pushed out of Port Harcourt and the surrounding countryside, but, had the 52nd Brigade continued the pursue the retreating Nigerians they could have most likely re-captured Bonny. Kalu quickly fell out of favor with the local Biafran civilian leaders in Port Harcourt due to his inability to clear the area of the Nigerian threat and, consequently, was relieved of his command of the 52nd Brigade by President Ojukwu and replaced by Maj. Joseph Achuzie on May 19, 1968. After 5 days of fierce urban warfare, Port Harcourt fell to the Nigerian 3rd Division under Gen. Adekunle while the Biafran 52nd Brigade was forced to retreat to Igrita.

After being relieved of his command by Ojukwu, Kalu was made commander of the Biafran 63rd Brigade and staged a successful assault behind enemy lines after crossing the Niger River under the cover of darkness. The 63rd Brigade staged attacks against Nigerian 2nd Division soldiers stationed in Asaba, Ogwashi-Uku, and Igbuzo. After staging these guerrilla attacks that caused the Nigerians to suffer mass casualties, the 63rd Brigade soldiers slipped back into Biafran held territory with only minimal damage.

After Owerri was captured by two battalions of Nigerian soldiers, Kalu was made commander of the Biafran 14th Division and given strict orders in a letter written to him by President Ojukwu. In the letter Ojukwu states "Your role in the Port Harcourt disaster is still fresh in the minds of people. You must clear the enemy from Obinze in 24 hours or submit your resignation from the army." Only a few hours later Lt. Col. Kalu ordered a Biafran counter-attack and with the assistance of the Ogbunigwe mine the Nigerian advance was halted and Obinze was captured. On December 3, 1968, the 14th Division under Kalu and the 63rd Brigade under Col. Lambert Ihenacho made their way towards Owerri, capturing the villages of Eziama and Elelem. Kalu's 14th Division was ordered to halt and dig in around Owerri while the Biafran 60th Brigade under Col. Azum Asoya carried out the main assault against the Nigerian 16th Division under Col. E.A. Etuk. Over 50,000 rounds of ammunition, 300 mortars, 200 howitzer shells, and 20 anti-tank weapons were fired by the Biafrans during a two-day bombardment of Nigerian defensive positions in and around Owerri, but, the Nigerians were dug-in and remained in their original positions after suffering heavy casualties. After nearly 4 months of heavy fighting the Nigerian 16th Division remained in Owerri, though now drastically reduced in number and short of food. On March 31, 1969, the Biafran 14th Division under Lt. Col. Kalu attacked Owerri and managed to secure control over 70% of the city. Biafran soldiers began intercepting radio waves that revealed the 16th Brigade was going to execute all Biafran POWs due to a lack of food. The Swedish pilot Carl Gustaf von Rosen and his "Biafra Babies" fighter squadron, consisting of six MFI-9 Junior fighters, constantly hounded Nigerian air drops, making Nigerian food supplies scarce. On April 24 the 300 Nigerian soldiers still under Col. Etuk's command began staging a breakout of Owerri and managed to escape to Nigerian-held territory after a day of heavy fighting against the Biafran troops surrounding the city. After the liberation of Owerri by the Biafran 14th Division Col. Kalu was promoted to the rank of Brigadier. Kalu remained stationed in Owerri until the end of the war when, on January 12, Kalu accompanied the new president of Biafra, Philip Effiong, along with Maj. Achuzie, and many other Biafran officers to Amichi, and later Owerri, to broadcast their final surrender to Gen. Obasanjo. Kalu was held in prison for 3 days until he was granted amnesty by Nigerian president Yakubu Gowon along with his fellow Biafran officers.
