= Invasion of Umuahia =

Military conflict in the Biafrin War

- Part of Biafran War
| Date | 20 March – 24 December 1969 |
| Location | Umuahia and Arochukwu |

Belligerents
| Nigeria | Biafra |

Commanders and leaders
| Olusegun Obasanjo; Mohammed Shuwa | Wilson Odo |

Strength
| 15,000 | 10,000 |

Casualties and losses
| Unknown | Unknown |

The Invasion of Umuahia (20 March – 24 December 1969) was a military conflict during the Biafran War between Nigerian and Biafran soldiers. The Invasion of Umuahia occurred during the final stages of the Civil War and happened eight months prior to the Biafran surrender.

== Background ==
Ever since the early stages of the Nigerian Civil War, both sides had been fighting for control of the Imo State. The Imo State was particularly important due to its capital, Owerri. Owerri was first invaded by the Nigerians on 17 September 1968, during Operation OAU and it was kept under Nigerian control until the Capture of Owerri in early 1969. Oguta had been attacked many times before and it became an important city during the war. It lay directly in the path of Owerri but it was heavily fortified by Biafran soldiers. Many roads connecting Oguta and Owerri to Nigerian-controlled cities were purposely destroyed by Biafran soldiers to delay attacks by the Nigerian army. After the large Nigerian loss at Owerri, Col. Benjamin Adekunle was replaced by Col. Olusegun Obasanjo. Since Oguta had been gained and lost two times in the last year, Nigerian Head of State Yakubu Gowon ordered a final attack on Oguta and Owerri.

== Battle ==
In May 1969 Murtala Muhammad and Mohammed Shuwa made their ways towards Oguta. Biafran President Odumegwu Ojukwu ordered Col. Omorowa, Adgara Ike, and Joseph Achuzie to defend the city. Before the arrival of the Nigerians, Achuzie was able to destroy the Port Harcourt – Owerri road and the Owerri – Onitsha road. In late May 1969 Mohammed Shuwa arrived with a large force of men in downtown Oguta. A large gun battle ensued and ended with the retreat of Shuwa's men and over 500 dead on both sides. Olusegun Obasanjo arrived with Murtala Muhammad in July 1969 with over 30 tanks and over 10,000 men. Obasanjo's men surrounded the city and began shelling the city. Over 30% of the city's population fled with over 2,200 civilians killed or wounded in the crossfire. The Biafrans managed to keep Oguta under their control for another 3 months but lost it when Olusegun Obasanjo invaded the city with full force on 9 October 1969. Even though Oguta was captured by the Nigerians they were unable to capture Owerri.

== Aftermath ==
The war remained at a stalemate until the invasion of Umuahia on 24 December 1969. The Biafran capital was moved to Owerri and there it stayed until the surrender of the country to the Nigerians on 15 January 1970.
