= Operation Leopard (1969) =

- Part of Biafran War
Date	March 27 – April 22, 1969 (3 weeks and 5 days)
Location	Umuahia
Result	Nigerian victory

Belligerents
Nigeria	Biafra

Commanders and leaders
Mohammed Shuwa; Theophilus Danjuma; Ibrahim Babangida (WIA)	Azum Asoya; Timothy Onwuatuegwu

Strength
Unknown	Unknown

Casualties and losses
Unknown	Unknown

Operation Leopard (March 27 – April 22, 1969) was a military operation conducted against Biafran troops defending Umuahia. No fighting took place inside Umuahia but the area surrounding it was heavily devastated by the Nigerian offensive. Umuahia was finally captured by Nigerian troops on April 22, 1969.

== Background ==
On September 17, 1968, after the successful attacks on Aba and Owerri, the Nigerian 3rd Marine Division under Col Benjamin Adekunle made their way towards the Biafran capital, Umuahia, only to be intercepted by a fierce Biafran defensive. A bloody battle between both sides lasted for 14 days before the 3rd Marine Division retreated to Owerri on October 1.

== Invasion ==
With the 3rd Marine Division's failed attempt to capture Umuahia during Operation OAU the Nigerian Col. Mohammed Shuwa decided to give it a try. Col. Shuwa put Lt. Col. Theophilus Danjuma in charge of the 1st Division consisting of the 4th, 21st, 22nd, 23rd, 24th, 25th, and 82nd battalions and began moving towards the Biafran capital. At the time Umuahia was defended by the Biafran 13th Division consisting of the 54th and 55th brigades. On March 27, 1969, a company of the Biafran 15th Division and 55th Brigade were suddenly attacked the invading Nigerians with overwhelming force. The 1st Division managed to break through a gap in the Biafran defenses and bulldozed their way even closer to the city. As a result of the swift Nigerian advance Biafran re-enforcements were being sent to Umuahia to defend the capital. Before re-enforcements arrived, the Nigerian 82nd Battalion under Maj. Ibrahim Babangida attacked and captured Uzuakoli. On April 2 Biafran artillery began bombarding the Nigerian 82nd Battalion in Uzuakoli, who replied with their own artillery fire. During the fierce fighting that ensued Maj. Babangida was wounded by a Biafran Ogbunigwe shell and was evacuated, being replaced by his second in command who counterattacked with armored cars and artillery. When the 82nd Battalion turned its guns on the Aba-Umuahia road the Biafrans replied with their Ogbunigwe mines and were able to capture Uzuakoli. On April 3 the Nigerian Air Force began bombing the Aba-Umuahia road from Uzuakoli to Umuahia, which lasted for 8 days, turning the road into an impassable fire storm. On April 19 the Nigerian 21st and 44th battalions broke through the Biafran defenses around Uzuakoli and managed to get within 4 km of Umuahia. Because the Aba-Umuahia road had been heavily mined and filled with obstacles Nigerian 1st Division troops decided to make their way to Umuahia across country with newly acquired trucks and tanks. Biafran Major Timothy Onwuatuegwu was replaced as commander of the S Division with Maj. Azum Asoya, but it was discovered too late that there were no Biafran troops in place to stop the advancing Nigerians. On April 22 the Nigerian 21st and 44th battalions occupied Umuahia.

== Aftermath ==
Umuahia stayed under Nigerian control for the rest of the war and served as the headquarters for the Nigerian 1st Division. On December 24, 1969, the Nigerian 3rd Marine Division under Col Olusegun Obasanjo launched a final attack on Biafra and managed to capture Owerri and the Uli airstrip within 2 weeks. On January 8, 1970, the new Biafran President Philip Effiong declared a ceasefire and surrendered to Nigeria on January 12.
