= Operation Tiger Claw =

- Part of Nigerian Civil War
Date	17–23 October 1967
Location	Calabar
Result	Nigerian victory

Belligerents
Nigeria	Biafra

Commanders and leaders
Benjamin Adekunle; Muhammadu Buhari	Ogbo Oji (WIA); Festus Akagha

Strength
Unknown	Unknown

Casualties and losses
Unknown	Unknown

Operation Tiger Claw was a military operation and battle in the Nigerian Civil War, fought between Nigerian and Biafran military forces. The battle took place in the major port of Calabar. The Nigerian forces were led by Benjamin Adekunle, while the Biafrans were led by Maj. Ogbo Oji. The aftermath was a major loss to the Biafrans as it cost them the loss one of their largest ports and exacerbated the naval blockade imposed against them by Nigeria.

== Background ==
Prior to the invasion of Calabar the Nigerian Army had been successful in forcing the invading Biafran Army to retreat from the Midwest Region in late September 1967 while also managing to capture the Biafran capital, Enugu, on 4 October. The Nigerian 3rd Marine Division under the command of Colonel Benjamin Adekunle disembarked from Warri aboard numerous warships bound for the port of Bonny, which was captured on 7 October. The Nigerians now planned to use Bonny as a launchpad for invading Calabar.

On 12 October 1967, Nigerian Navy ships began sailing to the port of Bonny to rendezvous in advance of the operation. By 16 October, the naval force had assembled, including the frigate NNS Nigeria, landing craft tank Lokoja, patrol ship Ogoja, survey ship Penelope, seaward defence boats Enugu and Bonny, and civilian ships MV Bode Thomas, MV Oduduwa and MV Warigi. The force departed for Calabar by 14:00 that day.

== Operation ==
The Nigerian naval force, led by Nigeria, arrived at Calabar at about 05:00 on 17 October. As the ships approached the port's jetty, they initiated a bombardment of the city. Over the next two days the ships continued the bombardment, though technical difficulties and depleting stocks of ammunition caused issues for the force, preventing it from landing troops at Oron as originally planned. One sailor on the Enugu was killed by shrapnel from friendly fire while Bonny's main gun's barrel broke and had to be replaced.

Less than 24 hours later the Nigerian 8th Battalion under the command of Maj. Ochefu disembarked from Lokoja and was able to capture Calabar's cement factory. Later that day the Nigerian 33rd Battalion landed on Calabar's beach, among them Col Adekunle himself. The small but stubborn Biafran resistance was overwhelmed but managed to retain control over certain parts of Calabar and its surrounding area. Bloody hand-to-hand fighting ensued after Nigerian troops began to enter Calabar from 3 different positions. Maj. Oji was seriously wounded during the fighting and evacuated to Umuahia while his outnumbered troops retreated to new defensive positions on the outskirts of Calabar. Lt. Col. David Okafor replaced Oji and decided that he would not counterattack until he was re-enforced by the Biafran 7th Battalion under the command of Lt. Col. Adigio. The 7th Battalion at first refused to embark to Calabar because their machine guns had been sent to Biafran troops fighting against Major Muhammadu Buhari and had been left with single-shot bolt-action rifles. After the 7th Battalion finally accepted the task Lt. Col. Adigio was replaced with Col. Festus Akagha. On 19 October the Biafran 7th Battalion arrived in Calabar where they were met by Nigerian armored cars, which they had no answer to. Col. Akagha relayed a message to President Odumegwu Ojukwu in which he stated the situation in Calabar was hopeless and that they were in desperate need of assistance. In the face of imminent devastation Ojukwu sent newly conscripted white mercenaries to Calabar but they came under immediate heavy Nigerian fire. After suffering unusually high casualties the remaining mercenaries retreated north and fled Biafra, never to return.

Calabar was not completely secured and not all federal forces and supplies landed until 23 October.

== Aftermath ==
The day after the surrender all captured Biafran troops were forced to give up all of their weapons. After Operation Tiger Claw the two sides were met at a stalemate until the Capture of Port Harcourt. One day after the Capture of Port Harcourt, Col Benjamin Adekunle and Col Murtala Mohammed invaded the Biafran cities of Owerri, Aba, and Umuahia which started Operation OAU. Col. Adekunle claimed that he could capture all three cities in two weeks but in reality it took six months and the Nigerians were unable to capture the Biafran capital of Umuahia. The Biafrans then took back the city of Owerri in January 1969. There were only minor scuffles until Nigerians captured Umuahia on 24 December 1969. The war finally ended on 15 January 1970, after the ending of Operation Tail-Wind.

== Works cited ==
- Udeagbala, Lawrence Okechukwu (2022). "A Comparative Study of the Nigerian and Biafran Navies During the Nigerian Civil War (1967–70)". African Navies: Historical and Contemporary Perspectives (1st ed.). London: Routledge. pp. 91–108. ISBN 9781003309154.
