= Operation Tail-Wind =

Military conflict between Nigeria and Biafra

- Part of Biafran War
| Date | 7–12 January 1970 |
| Location | Owerri and Uli |
| Result | Decisive Nigerian victory: Capitulation of Biafra |

Belligerents
| Nigeria | Biafra |

Commanders and leaders
| Olusegun Obasanjo | Odumegwu Ojukwu (surrendered); Philip Effiong (surrendered); Joseph Achuzie; Lambert Iheanacho; Azum Asoya; Ogbugo Kalu; Timothy Onwuatuegwu † |

Strength
| ~120,000 troops | Unknown |

Casualties and losses
| Unknown | Unknown |

Operation Tail-Wind ( 7–12 January 1970) was the final military operation in the Nigeria-Biafra War. It took place in the towns of Owerri and Uli, which were captured from the Biafran Armed Forces by the Nigerian Armed Forces. The President of Biafra, General Odumegwu Ojukwu, fled to the Ivory Coast on 8 January, and his successor, Major General Philip Effiong, surrendered to Colonel Olusegun Obasanjo on 13 January.

== Background ==
On 30 May 1967, Odumegwu Ojukwu declared the Republic of Biafra independent from Nigeria. For a month Nigeria claimed that Biafra was a part of Nigeria and it would stay so. It was not until 6 July 1967, when Nigeria invaded Biafra at the Battle of Nsukka. Biafra invaded Nigeria in August 1967 but were intercepted by Yakubu Gowon on 21 August 1967, and were repelled back at the Battle of Ore. Biafra kept a stiff resistance until their capital was taken in October 1967 at the Fall of Enugu. The Biafran capital was moved to Umuahia where it stayed for another 2 years. Nigeria captured the Biafran stronghold of Port Harcourt on 19 May 1968, at the Capture of Port Harcourt by Nigerian general Benjamin Adekunle. Adekunle tried to take the Biafran capital of Umuahia and the 2 other Biafran strongholds of Owerri and Aba during Operation OAU. During Operation OAU Adekunle gained control of Owerri and Aba but lost 21,500 men during the battles of OAU. In late 1968 Biafra was given $1,044,000 in donations by a British radio station. The Biafran government was able to deduct money from the donation to buy military supplies for their army. In early 1968 the Biafran army captured the city of Owerri at the Capture of Owerri. The Capture of Owerri gave the Biafrans hope for their cause. For months Nigeria and Biafra were in a stalemate. It was not until 23 December 1969, when Nigeria invaded the Biafran capital of Umuahia. On Christmas Eve 1969 Umuahia fell to Nigerian troops. The Biafran capital was then moved to Owerri.

== Final offensive ==
On 7 January 1970, the 3rd Marine Commando Division under Gen. Obasanjo, supported by the 1st Infantry Division to the north and the 2nd Infantry Division to the south, launched their final offensive. The Biafran S Division under Captain Azum Asoya was operating along the Port Harcourt - Elele road. The Division found itself cut off and disorganized due to a quick envelopment by the Nigerian 17th Brigade under Maj. Tomoye, the Nigerians now began making their advance on Owerri. On the outskirts of Owerri, Biafran Lt. Col. Lambert Iheanacho's 63rd Brigade came under withering attack by Maj. Tomoye's 17th Brigade, supported by 122 mm Soviet artillery. In less than a day of fighting the 63rd Brigade became overwhelmed by the Nigerian bombardment and were forced to surrender. While the Nigerians were preoccupied with attacking the 63rd Brigade, the Biafran leadership made their final meeting in which President Ojukwu announced his plans to go abroad "in search of peace". Ojuwku handed over the Biafran presidency to his vice-president Philip Effiong and placed all remaining Biafran troops under the command of Maj. Joseph Achuzie. On 9 January Maj. Timothy Onwuatuegwu escorted Ojukwu to the Uli Airstrip where he boarded his private jet and fled to the Ivory Coast. Immediately after Ojukwu's departure President Effiong called for a ceasefire to discuss the details of surrender. On 12 January Philip Effiong, Joseph Achuzie, Ogbugo Kalu, and other Biafran officers made their way to Amichi and later Owerri to broadcast their final surrender to Col. Obasanjo.

== Aftermath ==
There are two accounts about Timothy Onwuatuegwu's death in days following the surrender. One account by his former co-conspirator Maj. Adewale Ademoyega states that he was tricked into attending a meeting at a hotel with federal officers of the 3rd Marine Commando Division. At this meeting, that was said to have occurred on 15 January, he was summarily shot dead by vengeful officers personally aggrieved by the assassination of Brig. Ademulegun and his wife during the 1966 Nigerian coup d'état. An alternative account given by Col. Obasanjo states that during the process of surrender, Onwuatuegwu unsuccessfully attempted to ambush him near Amichi. After this he apparently made for the Cameroon border and was later killed in a firefight with Nigerian 1st Division soldiers. The truth about Maj. Onwuatuegwu's death is still unsolved.
