= Funsho =

- Language: Yoruba

Origin
- Origin: Nigeria
- Region of origin: South western Nigeria

Other names
- Variant form: Funso Olufunso

Funsho audio is a name of Yoruba descent common in Nigeria. Funsho is a diminutive of Olúfúnṣọ́ which means "God has given me to watch over".

== Notable people bearing the name ==
- Funsho Adeolu, Nigerian actor
- Funso Aiyejina, Nigerian poet
- Funsho Bamgboye, Nigerian footballer
- Funsho Ogundipe, Nigerian pianist
- Funsho Williams, Nigerian politician

== See also ==
- Funso Ojo, Belgian footballer
