= Godwin Alabi-Isama =

Nigerian military officer (born 1940)

Brigadier General Godwin Alabi-Isama
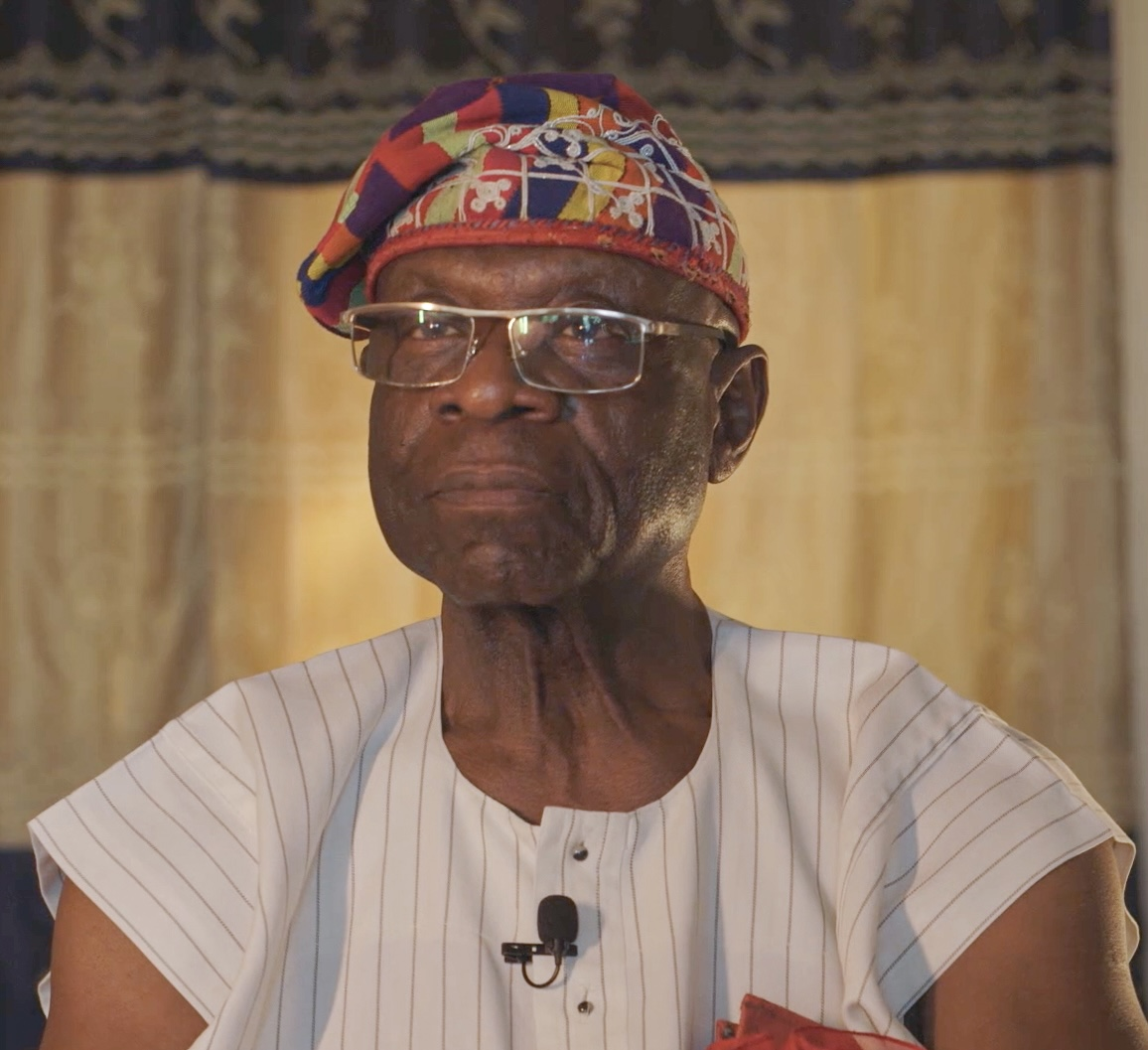
- Born: 24 December 1940 (age 85); Ilorin, Northern Region, British Nigeria (now in Kwara State, Nigeria)
- Education: Mons Officer Cadet School
- Military career
- Allegiance: Nigeria
- Branch: Nigerian Army
- Service years: 1960–1977
- Rank: Brigadier general
- Commands: 3 Marine Commando Division
- Conflicts: Nigerian Civil War

Godwin Alabi-Isama (born 24 December 1940) is a Nigerian retired military officer, author and statesman who served as chief of staff to Brigadier Benjamin Adekunle of the 3 Marine Commando during the Nigerian Civil War.

== Early life and education ==
Alabi-Isama was born on 24 December 1940, in Ilorin, Kwara State, to a Ukwuani (Delta State) father and a Yoruba (Ilorin) mother. He attended Ibadan Boys High School. In 1960, he joined the Army and attended the Mons Officer Cadet School in the United Kingdom and the Senior Tactics School and Staff College in Quella, Pakistan. Alabi-Isama was a tactics instructor at the Nigerian Military School in Zaria, Nigeria and the Nigerian Military Training College (now Nigerian Defence Academy) in Kaduna prior to the civil war.

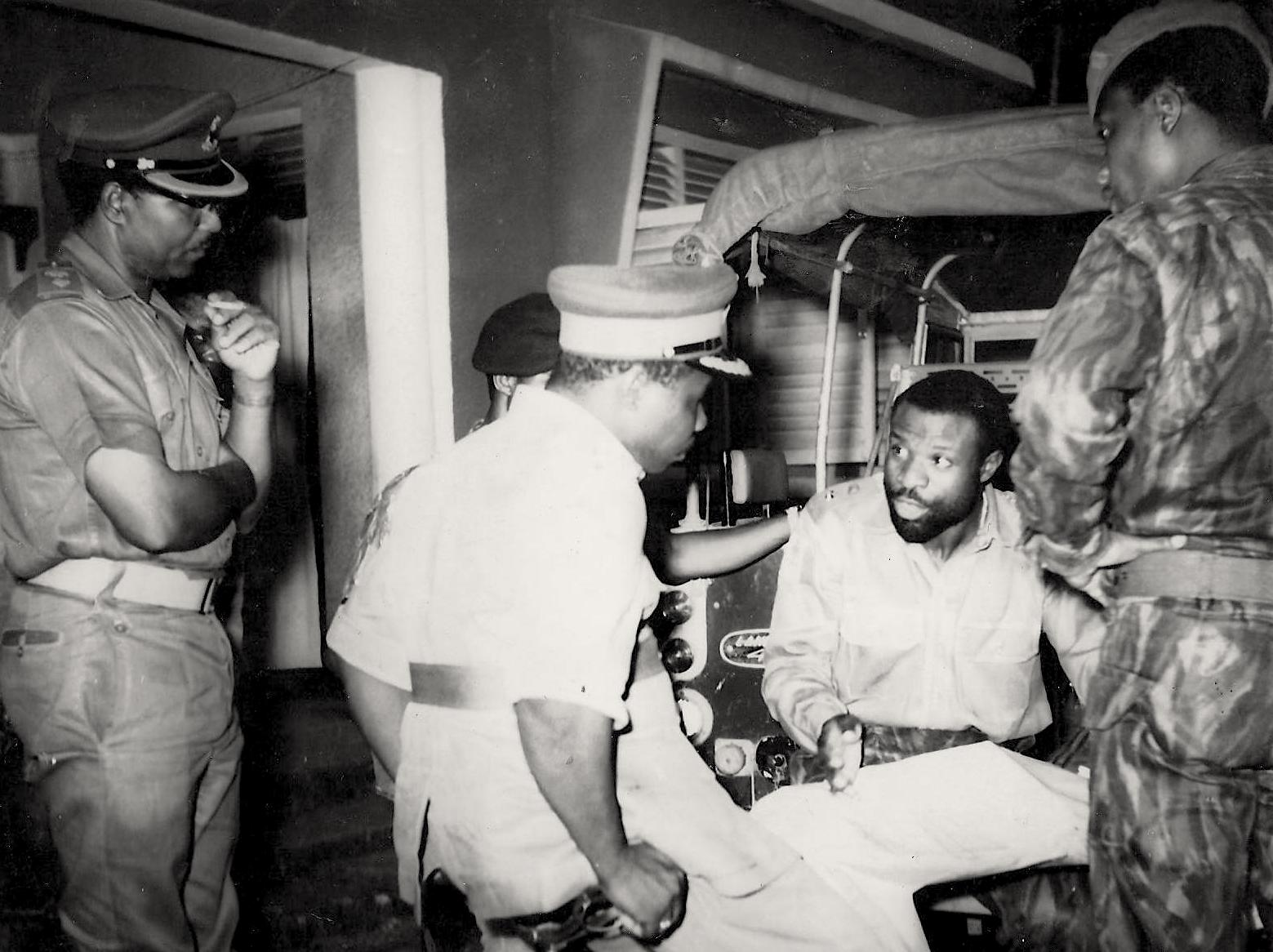
"Alabi-Isama (second right) briefing Col. Obasanjo (third right), Col. (Rev Father) Pedro Martins on plan of Op Pincer2 during the Nigerian civil war"

Brigadier-General Alabi-Isama served as the commander of the troops stationed at the Niger Bridge in Asaba, He was subsequently transferred by the Army Headquarters to the 3 Marine Commando, 3MCDO, operating on the Calabar front during the war. Alabi-Isama led forces against the Biafran Republic, successfully liberating various locations including Odukpani, Ikot-Okpora, Iwuru, Akunakuna, Itigidi, Ediba, Ugep, Obubra, Afikpo, Oban, and Ekang. He also "closed" the international border with Biafra at Nssakpa, as detailed in his book, The Tragedy of Victory.

In April 1968, Alabi-Isama and his 3MCDO men embarked on a mission to recapture Creek Town, Itu, Uyo, Ikot-Ekpene, Oron, Eket, Opobo, Abak, Etinan, Bori-Ogoni, Akwete, Afam, Aletu Ekene, Elelenwo, Okrika, and Port-Harcourt, successfully completing the operation the following month. After the war, Alabi-Isama assumed the role of the Nigerian Army's Principal General Staff Officer. In 1973, he served as the Acting Governor of the Mid-Western Region, where he notably received the first group of National Youth Service Corps members, as recounted in his autobiography. Following his retirement as a Brigadier-General from the Army in 1977, Alabi-Isama relocated to the United States.

== Role in the Nigeria Civil War ==
Alabi-Isama played a pivotal role in leading the troops that successfully liberated the remaining parts of Cross River State following Colonel Adekunle's amphibious sea landing at Calabar. Furthermore, he commanded the 3 Marine Commando troops that effectively captured the present-day states of Akwa Ibom, Rivers, and Bayelsa. His strategic planning, specifically the implementation of the Pincer 2 strategy, played a crucial role in bringing an end to the Nigerian Civil War.

== Writing ==
The Tragedy of Victory: On-the-Spot Account of the Nigeria-Biafra War in the Atlantic Theatre is a sequential narrative of the war that lasted from 6 July 1967 to 15 January 1970 which was published in 2013.
