= Siege of Owerri =

Battle in the Nigerian Civil War

- Part of Nigerian Civil War
Date	15 October 1968 – 25 April 1969 (6 months, 1 week and 3 days)
Location	Owerri, Nigeria
Result	Biafran victory

Belligerents
Nigeria	Biafra

Commanders and leaders
E.A. Etuk; Ted Hamman †	Timothy Onwuatuegwu; Joseph Achuzie; Ogbugo Kalu; Azum Asoya; Carl Gustaf von Rosen

Strength
3,000	Unknown

Casualties and losses
1,800–2,700	Unknown

The siege of Owerri (15 October 1968 – 25 April 1969) was a battle between Nigerian and Biafran forces in the Nigerian Civil War. The capture was a major victory for the Biafrans because the victory opened up telephone lines, enhanced road telecommunications, and showed that with stiff resistance, Biafra could defeat Nigerian forces.

== Prelude ==
In July 1968, commander of the 3rd Marine Commando (3MCDO), Colonel Benjamin Adekunle began making plans for an invasion of Aba, Owerri, and Umuahia in a military operation he nicknamed Operation OAU. Adekunle stated that he would be able to capture all three cities in two weeks. Adekunle's strategy was to surround a city and starve it into submission before attacking its weakened defenders. After 12 days of fierce fighting in Aba, the 3MCDO managed to capture the city on 14 September, followed by Owerri on 16 September. When the 3MCDO was pushed back at Umuahia, the Nigerians retreated to Owerri, where they set up defenses in and around the city. The Biafrans made their way down the Aba-Umuahia road and managed to capture the entire road along with Aba on 15 October.

== The siege ==
On 15 October 1968, while Nigerian Head of State Yakubu Gowon was distracted by the anti-tax riots in the west, the Biafran Brigadier Alexander Madiebo encircled Owerri while a unit of Biafran soldiers attacked Nigerian supply convoys attempting to enter the city. The Biafrans were assisted by heavy rain and mud which slowed down supply convoys even further.

On 3 December the Biafran 14th Division under Colonel Ogbugo Kalu and 63rd Brigade under Col. Lambert Ihenacho moved towards Owerri, capturing the villages of Eziama and Elelem.

On 5 December the Biafran 60th Brigade under Colonel Azum Asoya began the main assault on Owerri, in which over 50,000 rounds of ammunition, 300 mortars, 200 howitzer shells, and 20 anti-tank weapons were fired. The assault lasted for two days but the 3,000-man Nigerian 16th Division under Colonel E. A. Etuk stayed in their original position, while suffering heavy casualties. The Biafran 68th Battalion under Major Ikeji gained control of a stretch of the Port Harcourt road from Owerri to the Otamiri River, establishing a link with the 63rd Brigade.

On 19 December 16 Division regrouped its soldiers and captured the town of Abiaka, followed by Avu and Afrola on 29 December.

On 6 January 1969 the Biafran 60th Brigade captured Umuakpu, Umuagwo, and Omanelu while the Biafran 68th Battalion under Major Ikeji seized Obinze; the 68th Battalion attempted to capture Avu but were beaten back by the Nigerian 16th Brigade. By the end of the day, the Biafrans controlled much of the Port Harcourt road and began planting mines, digging ditches, and laying trees across it in an attempt to block any Nigerian reinforcements from entering Owerri.

On 15 January the Biafran 60th Brigade attacked Owerri and were able to force the 16th Division to retreat across the Otamini Bridge. Instead of pursuing the retreating Nigerians, the hungry and half-naked Biafran soldiers discovered the Nigerians' food and clothing supplies and decided to have their fill. The Nigerian 16th Brigade was able to regroup and made a counter-attack across the Otamini Bridge, causing the Biafrans to retreat.

On 24 January the Nigerian government renewed its offensive and began bombing Biafran positions in the area. After five days of continuous air strikes, the Biafrans remained in their original positions; the Nigerian government knew that Owerri was encircled and they couldn't do anything about it.

On 7 February both the Nigerian Air Force and Egyptian mercenaries bombed out and completely destroyed the villages of Umohiagu and Ozu Abam, which prompted accusations by the Biafran Government and its officials of deliberately targeting civilians. The government ordered the Nigerian Air Force to avoid civilian targets but they disregarded this request and continued to bomb towns and Red Cross shelters. In late February, Gen. Gowon visited the 16th Brigade in Owerri and attempted to encourage them to keep fighting until re-enforcements could be sent.

On 14 March Nigerian troops attempted to capture the Omanelu-Umuakpu and Elele-Ubimini-Awarra roads but were beaten back by defending Biafran soldiers, leaving them isolated and short of food.

On 15 March the Biafran S Division under Major Timothy Onwuatuegwu made a frontal assault on the 16th Brigade but was forced to halt after suffering heavy casualties. Major Onwuatuegwu placed half of his men under the command of Major Joseph Achuzie and were able to get within 1 km of the city. Major Achuzie demanded total control of the S Division but was refused by Onwuatuegwu and the two men almost shot each other after drawing their guns. President Ojukwu stepped in and gave Major Achuzie control of the S Division for one week, continuing the frontal assault on Owerri. Achuzie's plan ultimately failed and he retreated after suffering heavy casualties, Ojukwu then immediately restored Onwuatuegwu as commander and began drawing up new plans for invading Owerri.

On 31 March the Biafran 14th Division under Ogbugo Kalu attacked Owerri and secured control over 70% of the city. Biafran soldiers began intercepting radio waves that revealed the 16th Brigade was going to execute all Biafran POWs due to a lack of food. The Swedish pilot Carl Gustaf von Rosen and his "Biafra Babies" fighter squadron, consisting of six MFI-9 Junior fighters, constantly hounded Nigerian air drops, making Nigerian food supplies scarce.

On 20 April Etuk's second-in-command, Major Ted Hamman, was shot and killed in Owerri by a Biafran sniper who had managed to get within firing range.

On 24 April the remaining 300 soldiers of the Nigerian 16th Division began fighting their way out of Owerri and escaped into Nigerian held territory on 25 April.

== Aftermath ==
Two days before Owerri's capture, the Biafran capital, Umuahia, fell to Col. Mohammed Shuwa's 1st Division and the capital was moved to Aba. Once Owerri was retaken, the Biafran capital was once again moved, now to Owerri. The Biafrans held on to Owerri for over eight months until the Nigerian 3rd Marine Division, under Col. Olusegun Obasanjo, attacked and occupied the city on 7 January 1970.
