= Timothy Onwuatuegwu =

Nigerian army officer

- Born: unknown Ohaji/Egbema
- Died: 15 January 1970; Biafra
- Military career
- Allegiance: Nigeria (1961–1966); Biafra (1967–1970)
- Service years: 1961–1970
- Rank: Major (Nigerian Army); Major (Biafran Army)
- Commands: Biafran S Division
- Conflicts: 1966 Nigerian coup d'etat; Nigerian Civil War; Siege of Owerri; Operation Leopard; Operation Tail-Wind †

Timothy Onwuatuegwu (? – 15 January 1970) was a Nigerian military officer and later a Major in the Biafran Armed Forces. He was a leading military figure in the Nigerian Civil War and a participant in the 1966 Nigerian coup d'etat.

== Education ==
Onwuategwu received his commission into the Nigerian army after graduating from the Royal Military Academy, Sandhurst, United Kingdom in 1961, where he was coursemates with other officers such as Murtala Muhammed, Muhammed Shuwa, and Illiya Bisalla.

== 1966 Coup ==
Timothy Onwuatuegwu took part in the 1966 military coup which overthrew Nigerian Prime Minister Abubakar Tafawa Balewa while also killing many other Northern senior army officers. Onwuatuegwu was put in control of a small band of soldiers whose main job was to assassinate any Nigerian officer or politician they deemed a threat in Kaduna. Maj. Onwuatuegwu, personally led a detachment of soldiers to Brig. Samuel Ademulegun's house. Onwuatuegwu made his way up to the Brigadier's room where he was laying beside his wife. Upon seeing Onwuatuegwu enter the room, Ademulegun shouted at him "Timothy, what the devil do you think you're doing?". Onwuatuegwu told Ademulegun that he was under arrest. Ademulegun reached for a drawer beside his bed, and as he did so, Onwuatuegwu shot him dead in his bed, along with Ademulegun's wife who was laying beside him. Although the coup was stopped by General Johnson Aguiyi-Ironsi both Onwuatuegwu and his superior Major Chukwuma Kaduna Nzeogwu were able to control the northern portion of Nigeria for a few weeks. Both Onwuatuegwu and Nzeogwu were arrested by Nigerian police officers in early February but were not executed which outraged many Northern civilians. For an entire year Onwuatuegwu was in an Enugu prison until May 30, 1967 when he was freed by Biafran leader Odumegwu Ojukwu.

== Biafra ==
When Biafra was declared independent on 30 May 1967 Ojukwu made Onwuatuegwu a Major in his Army. Onwuatuegwu did not see much action until March 1969 when he was put in charge of the Biafran S Division, in charge of re-capturing Owerri from the Nigerian Army. On 15 March 1969 Onwuatuegwu led an assault on the Nigerian 16th Division, who had been occupying Owerri since October 1968, but was forced to halt after suffering heavy casualties. Onwuatuegwu placed half of his men under the command of Maj. Joseph Achuzie, who managed to get within 1 km of the city. Achuzie demanded total control of the S Division but was refused by Onwuatuegwu and the two men almost shot each other after drawing their pistols. President Ojukwu stepped in and gave Achuzie command of the S Division for 1 week. Achuzie's full-frontal attack ultimately failed and was forced to retreat and Ojukwu restored Onwuatuegwu as head of the S Division. On 9 January 1970 Onwuatuegwu escorted Biafran president, Odumegwu Ojukwu, to Uli Airport.

== Death ==
There are two accounts about Timothy Onwuatuegwu's death in days following the surrender. One account by his former co-conspirator Maj. Adewale Ademoyega states that he was tricked into attending a meeting at a hotel with federal officers of the 3rd Marine Commando Division. At this meeting, that was said to have occurred on 15 January, he was summarily shot dead by vengeful officers personally aggrieved by the assassination of Brig. Ademulegun and his wife during the 1966 Nigerian coup d'état. An alternative account given by Col. Obasanjo states that during the process of surrender, Onwuatuegwu unsuccessfully attempted to ambush him near Amichi. After this he apparently made for the Cameroon border and was later killed in a firefight with Nigerian 1st Division soldiers. The truth about Maj. Onwuatuegwu's death remains a mystery.
