= Ogundipe =

Ogundipe is a surname. Notable people with the surname include:

- Babafemi Ogundipe (1924–1971), Nigerian politician
- Funsho Ogundipe (born 1968), Nigerian pianist, music director and composer
- Isaac O. Ogundipe (born 1948), Nigerian engineer
- Molara Ogundipe (born 1940), Nigerian poet, critic and editor
- Oluwatoyin Ogundipe (born 1960), Nigerian academic
- P. A. Ogundipe (1927-2020), Nigerian educator, civil servant and writer
