= Ohoba =

Town in Imo state, Nigeria

Coordinates: 5°24′50″N 6°52′52″E

Ohoba is a town in Southeastern Nigeria. It is made up of six communities - Eziama, Umukpo, Umukpoche, Umugologo, Umunwanyi, and Alaka. Ohoba is centrally located in Ohaji/Egbema Local Government Area of Imo State, Nigeria. And shares a common boundary with the city of Owerri. Farming and trading are the main occupations of Ohoba people and they depend largely on agricultural produce as the main source of income, while some are civil servants. A larger portion of the land where Adapalm (Nig) Ltd of Ohaji is located belongs to Ohoba.
