= Illiya Bisalla =

Nigerian army officer

Major General Illiya Bisalla
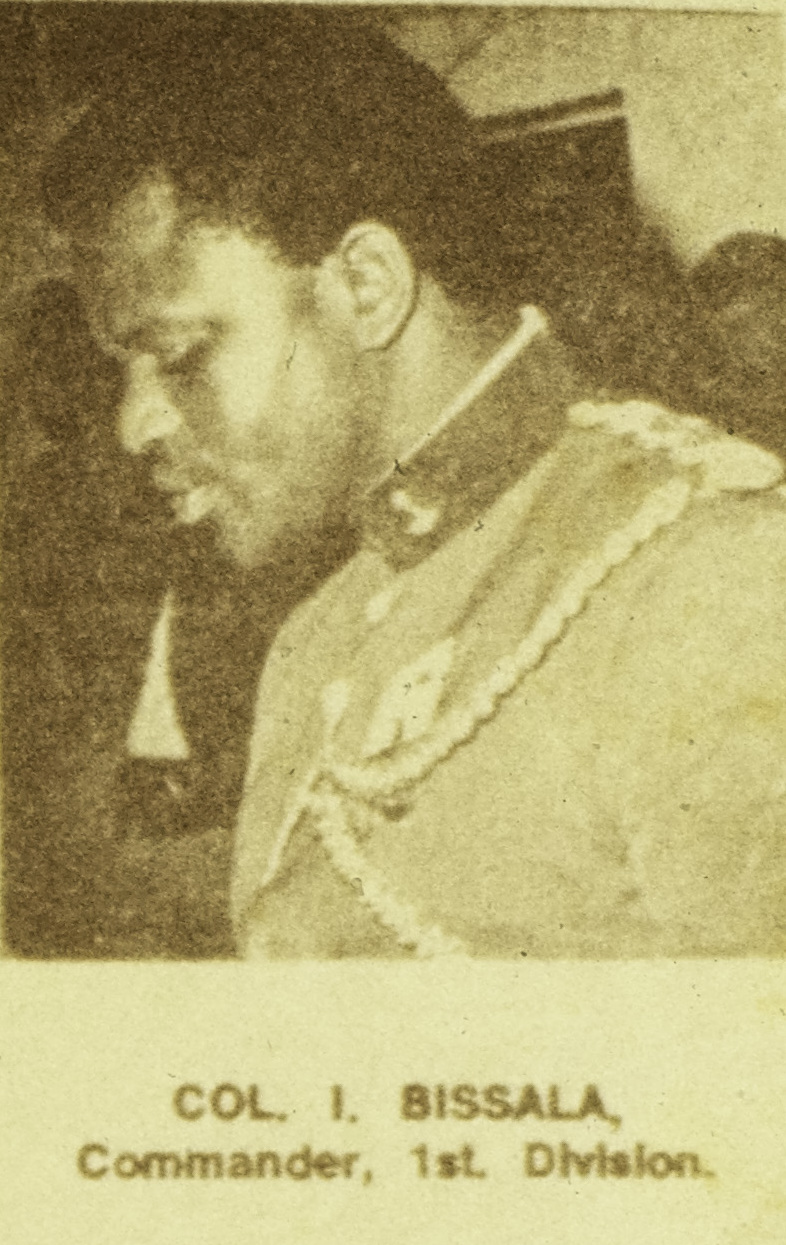

Commissioner of Defence
- In office 1975–1976
- Preceded by: Gen. Yakubu Gowon
- Succeeded by: Brig. O. Obasanjo

Commandant of the Nigerian Defence Academy
- In office February 1975 – August 1975
- Preceded by: Maj-Gen E.O. Ekpo
- Succeeded by: Brig Gibson Jalo

General Officer Commanding 1 Division Nigerian Army
- In office September 1969 – December 1973
- Preceded by: Gen. Mohammed Shuwa
- Succeeded by: Brig. I.B. Haruna

Personal details
- Died: 11 March 1976 Nigeria
- Education: RMA Sandhurst

Military service
- Branch/service: Nigerian Army
- Years of service: 1961–1976
- Rank: Major General

Iliya D. Bisalla (died 11 March 1976) was a Major General in the Nigerian Army and Commissioner of Defence (title is now Minister of Defence) under the military administration of General Murtala Mohammed, the 4th Nigerian Head of State.

== Military career ==
Bisalla was a course mate of General Hassan Katsina at Royal Military Academy Sandhurst. Before becoming the Defense Commissioner, General Bisalla was the General Officer Commanding (GOC) 1st Infantry Division of the Nigerian Army from Sep 1969 to December 1973, and also Commandant of the Nigeria Defence Academy, Kaduna.

== Implication and conviction in the February 1976 coup attempt ==
General Bisalla was implicated by Colonel Dimka's confessional statements after investigations into the abortive 13 February 1976 Dimka led coup which resulted in General Mohammed's assassination. Bisalla was controversially convicted of conspiracy and concealment of treason by the secret Special Military Tribunal; and as a result, Bisalla's complicity is not clear (e.g., the Federal Military Government (FMG) asserted that Bisalla gave Dimka operational orders while Dimka, under interrogation, stated that another officer (Major Rabo) provided the operational orders). Importantly, Dimka's confessional was not corroborated and Dimka was known to have provided inconsistent testimonies and drank beer while being interrogated.

== Death ==
General Bisalla along with 31 other alleged co-conspirators some clearly guilty (such as Colonel Dimka and Lt. William Seri) and others whose guilt remain questionable (such as Joseph Gomwalk) were executed by firing squad on 11 March 1976.
