= First Invasion of Onitsha =

Military conflict

- Part of Biafran War
- First Invasion of Onitsha (Nigeria)
Date	October 4–12, 1967 (1 week and 1 day)
Location	Onitsha
Result	Biafran victory

Belligerents
Nigeria	Biafra

Commanders and leaders
Murtala Muhammed; Ipoola Alani Akinrinade	Joseph Achuzie; Assam Nsudoh; Mike Inveso

Strength
10,000–15,000	Unknown

Casualties and losses
5,000–10,000	Unknown

The First Invasion of Onitsha (October 4 − October 12, 1967) was a battle and military offensive fought during the Nigerian Civil War between Biafran and Nigerian forces. The Nigerian Army's 2nd Division managed to seize control of Onitsha for less than a day before being pushed out and crushed by Biafran soldiers.

== Prelude ==
On September 20, 1967, the Nigerian 2nd Division under General Murtala Muhammed forced all Biafran soldiers within Nigeria's Mid-Western Region to retreat eastwards towards Biafra. In an attempt to halt the Nigerian advance, retreating Biafran soldiers destroyed the River Niger Bridge at Onitsha, meaning the Nigerians on the other side of the river were unable to advance. In October 1967, 2nd Division soldiers entered Asaba and began setting up artillery positions on the river banks and preparing for an invasion.

With the destruction of the bridge, the options for federal forces attacking Onitsha were to effect a direct river crossing towards Onitsha or cross the river in territory held by the 1st Division and then advance to the city overland. While Nigerian Army headquarters in Lagos and some of his subordinates advised Muhammed to pursue the safer second option, he refused owing to his longstanding rivalry with 1st Division commander Colonel Mohammed Shuwa. He also believed that any delay would means his forces would lose momentum and give the Biafrans time to consolidate. At a meeting to review the planned attack, Shuwa unsuccessfully urged Muhammed to reconsider. Lieutenant Colonel Frank Aisida, a bigrade commander within the 2nd Division, was so convinced of the danger and futility of a direct assault across the river that he refused to take part.

== Invasion ==
The Biafran 11th Division consisting of the 11th, 12th and 18th Battalions was given the task of defending Onitsha. The 12th Battalion under Col. Mike Inveso was responsible for defending the area between Idah and Nsugbe, the 18th Battalion under Col. Assam Nsudoh was responsible for defending Onitsha town, and the 11th Battalion under Maj. Joseph Achuzie defended the area between Atani and Ndoni. The riverine beaches around Onitsha were heavily mined and defended by Biafran machine guns and anti-tank weapons. Because the Biafrans had destroyed the bridge, Muhammed was left with the decision of crossing the river at Idah or making an amphibious attack on Onitsha. Muhammed disregarded advice from the Nigerian Army HQ and chose to attack Onitsha head on. On October 4, 1967, he ordered his artillery to begin bombarding Onitsha. Eight days later, he personally led a 10-boat armada carrying 5,000 Nigerian soldiers across the river. The Biafran 18th Battalion resisted stubbornly but were forced to retreat in disarray. However, instead of pursuing them and occupying the town, the Nigerians began looting and burning the Onitsha Market to the ground. This gave the 18th Battalion time to reorganize and counter-attack. The 11th Battalion under Maj. Achuzie made their way up the New Market road while the 18th Battalion under Col. Nsudoh swung down the Old Market road towards Onitsha. Nigerian 2nd Division soldiers stationed in Onitsha were then totally routed and most were killed or taken prisoner. Undaunted, Muhammed ordered a 5,000 man reserve from Lagos to cross the river but they were also defeated. He then ordered troops under Lt. Col. Ipoola Alani Akinrinade to make a third assault but these were again thwarted by the Biafran 11th and 18th Battalions. Muhammed realized attacking Onitsha from Asaba was futile and began heading north towards Idah.

== Aftermath ==
On November 19, 1967, pilots from the Soviet Union and United Arab Republic flying MiG-17s began bombing areas around Onitsha, devastating the population. In December 1967, the Nigerian 2nd Division and 6th Battalion under Muhammed crossed the river at Idah and were stationed in Enugu. On January 2, 1968, the Nigerians moved towards Onitsha in a two pronged attack launched from two axes. The 2nd Division rolled through Biafran held territory including numerous towns and cities. On January 19, Nigerian troops attacked and occupied Awka, giving the 2nd Division a direct route to Onitsha. The Biafran 11th Division under Maj. Joseph Achuzie fought fiercely against the Nigerians and managed to hold them off for over three months before Abagana was captured on March 20, followed by Onitsha less than 24 hours later.

== Works cited ==
- Baxter, Peter (2015). Biafra: The Nigerian Civil War 1967-1970. Helion and Company. ISBN 9781910777473.
- Siollun, Max (2009). Oil, Politics and Violence : Nigeria's Military Coup Culture (1966-1976). New York: Algora Publishing. ISBN 9780875867106.
