= Igala–Benin War =

Conflict in West Africa

- Part of European exploration of Africa
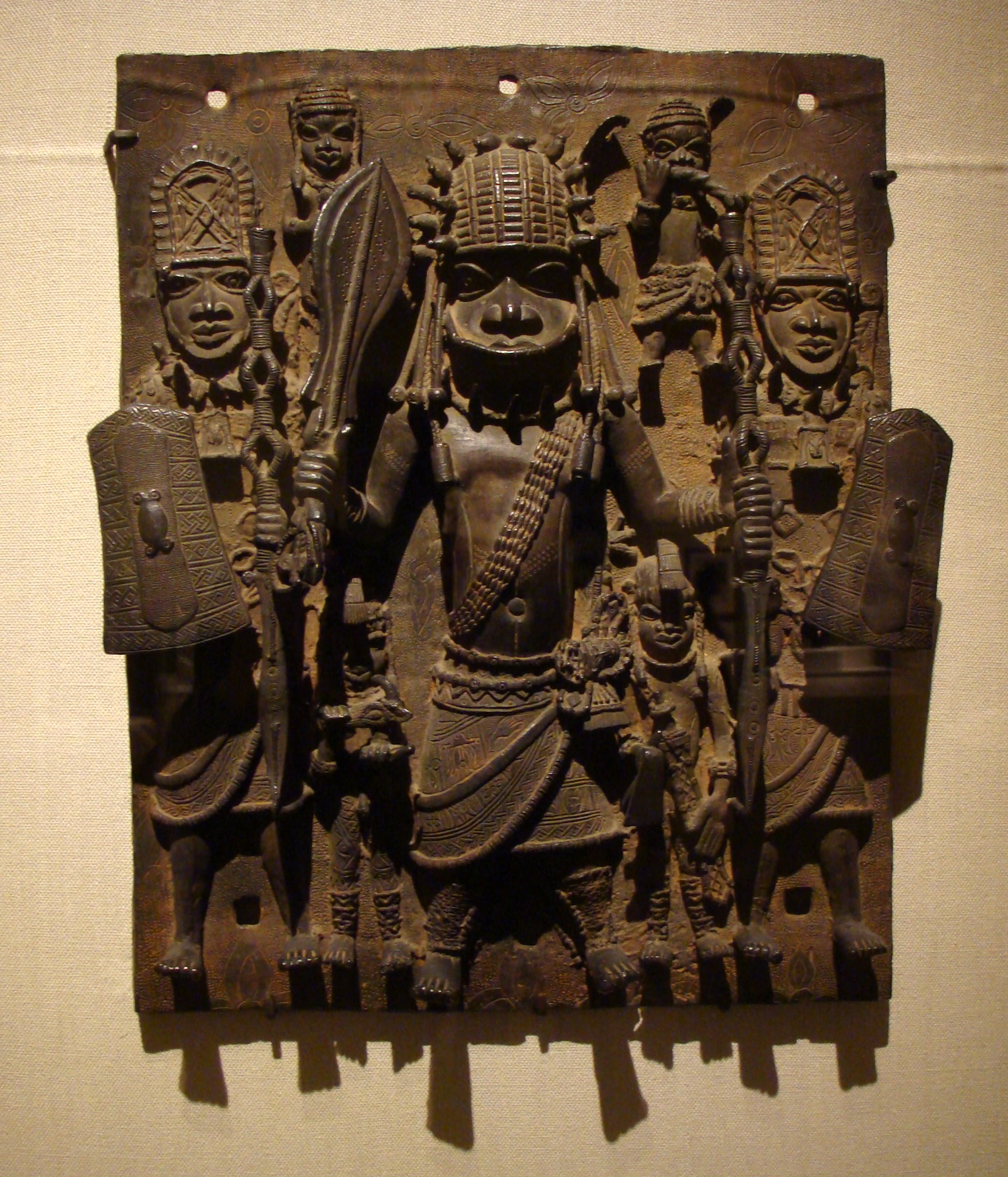
- Benin kingdom warriors
Date	1515–1516
Location	Present day Nigeria
Result	Benin-Portuguese victory

Belligerents
Kingdom of Benin (Portugal) Portuguese Empire	Igala Kingdom; Traitor from Benin

Commanders and leaders
Queen Idia; Oba Esigie	Ata of Igala; Chife Ohliah †

Strength
Unknown, but Portuguese forces were deployed	Unknown

Casualties and losses
Unknown	Unknown

The Igala–Benin War was a short conflict between the Igala Kingdom and the Kingdom of Benin that lasted from 1515 to 1516.

== Background ==
The Igala–Benin War was declared when the previous Oba of Benin converted to Christianity to trade with the Portuguese Empire. Some Benin nobles who were unhappy with the decision betrayed the Oba for the Ata of Igala.

== The war ==
The Igala–Benin War's outcome was significantly influenced by two key factors. Firstly, the war took a dramatic turn when the servant of Queen Idia managed to assassinate the Igala general, disrupting their command structure and weakening their forces. Secondly, under the reign of Oba Esigie, the Benin Kingdom benefited from Portuguese firepower and military assistance, giving them a significant advantage in terms of weaponry and tactics. These combined factors played a crucial role in Benin's victory and the relatively easier path to success during this historical conflict.

== Aftermath ==
The war played a significant role in the Afro-Portuguese relations in the 16th century. It also played a role in slavery by the Europeans since the Benin Kingdom sold slaves to the Portuguese and other European merchants.

== See also ==
- Akure–Benin War

== Bibliographies ==
- Falola, T.; Salau, M.B. (2021). Africa in Global History: A Handbook. De Gruyter Reference (in Italian). De Gruyter. ISBN 978-3-11-067801-7.
- Gunsch, K.W. (2017). The Benin Plaques: A 16th Century Imperial Monument. Routledge Research in Art History. Taylor & Francis. ISBN 978-0-429-67946-9.
- French, H.W. (2021). Born in Blackness: Africa, Africans, and the Making of the Modern World, 1471 to the Second World War. Liveright. ISBN 978-1-63149-583-0.
