= Ogbunigwe =

- Place of origin: Biafra (present-day Nigeria)

Service history
- In service: 1967-1970
- Used by: Biafra
- Wars: Nigerian Civil War

Production history
- Designer: Seth Nwanagu, Sylvester Akalonu, Gordian Ezekwe, Benjamin Nwosu, Willy Achukwu, Nath Okpala and others
- Designed: September 1967
- Manufacturer: Research and Production Organization of Biafra (RAP)
- Variants: Various

Specifications
- Effective firing range: 8,000 metres (8,700 yd)
- Warhead weight: 5kg-500kg
- Propellant: Rocket propellant
- Guidance system: none

Ogbunigwe,// also called Ojukwu Bucket, was a series of weapons systems including command detonation mines, improvised explosive devices, and rocket-propelled missiles, mass-produced by the Republic of Biafra and used against Nigeria between 1967 and 1970 in the Nigerian Civil War.

== History ==
At the outbreak of hostilities, the Biafran armed forces were poorly equipped as compared to the Nigerian army with arms and ammunition being in short supply. This imbalance in power was intensified in the course of the war. Biafran scientists, prominently from the University of Biafra (now University of Nigeria Nsukka), formed the Research and Production (RAP) Agency of Biafra which included a Weapons Research and Production Group. Headed by Colonel Ejike Obumneme Aghanya, it was the aim and purpose of this group to develop an indigenous arms industry and they soon started with the production of ammunition, grenades and armoured cars. Their most effective and infamous product was the Ogbunigwe of which there were different types in various sizes. The term Ogbunigwe later came to include grenades and landmines but initially referred to non guided rocket propelled surface-to-air missiles which were later converted to surface-to-surface missiles. The engineers Seth Nwanagu, Willy Achukwu, Sylvester Akalonu, Nath Okpala, Gordian Ezekwe, Benjamin Nwosu and others were instrumental in the design and production of the weapons.

The name Ogbunigwe means “mass killer”, Following the war, the name Ogbunigwe now has various meanings from "landmine" to "instrument that kills in multitudes." The first type of Ogbunigwe to be produced and tested in combat was the rocket propelled surface to surface missile. It was designed as a surface to air missile to be used in defense against Nigerian MiG-15 fighters marauding the Enugu airport. Before the missile could be used successfully at its actual purpose as an anti aircraft missile, Nigerian troops captured Enugu where the missiles were being produced in October 1967. Following the fall of Enugu, a group of retreating Biafran soldiers were fighting rearguard action against a battalion of heavily armed Nigerian troops at the Ugwuoba bridge along the old Enugu-Awka road. As the ammunition of the Biafran troops was exhausted their commander ordered them, as a last resort, to adapt the use of the Ogbunigwe surface to air missile they were equipped with, by launching them horizontally at the enemy instead of vertically as designed for anti aircraft action. The effect was devastating and extensive. As a result of this incident, the missile was converted and utilised for the rest of the war as a surface-to-surface missile, and as a surface-to-ship missile during the Second Invasion of Onitsha.

According to Biafran government claims at the time, the flying Ogbunigwe was the first rocket to be wholly designed, developed, mass-produced and launched in Africa. It was used in combat in 1967, over one year before the launching of the first indigenous South African rocket in December 1968.

At the height of production, about 500 units were being produced per day in Biafra.

== Impact ==
The Ogbunigwe mines and warheads generally had a killing range of between 180 and 800 metres, an effective shrapnel radius of a 90° arc and could easily wipe out a company of enemy troops. The self-propelled rocket versions had a missile range of 8 kilometres. The weapons were annihilating for enemy infantry and armoured vehicles. British journalist Frederick Forsyth describes the use of the flying Ogbunigwe against an attack by the Nigerian army 1st division in 1969 as follows:

It spread death and destruction over a large area, and as usual the first division (...) were advancing in solid phalanxes of packed soldiery. An American who examined the scene afterwards estimated that, out of 6000 men who took part in the attack, 4000 failed to return.

Ogbunigwe`s were used to spectacular and devastating effect in the Abagana ambush which wiped out almost the entire Nigerian 2nd Division in 1968. They were also used effectively in knocking out Nigerian Army Saladin and Ferret armoured cars. The surface-to-air models were used against mercenary flown Nigerian Air Force Mig 17 jet fighters in the defence of Uli airport. The lack of a guidance system made the missiles notoriously inaccurate against fast flying jet aircraft. The design was based on an air burst principle intended to destabilise the plane by shock wave effect, as well as throw shrapnel and debris in its path to clog up the engines. Though some close calls are reported by Russian pilots flying for the Nigerian Air Force, there are no indications that a Biafran missile shot down an enemy plane. The Biafran Air Force B-25 and B-26 bombers were also fitted with self made Ogbunigwe rockets and bombs.

Ogbunigwe was the most effective Biafran weapon during the war and the Nigerian forces were not able to find an efficient defence against it. Well placed mines or rocket salvos coordinated by few determined soldiers were often enough to stop an entire Nigerian advance. The Ogbunigwe in its various forms was able to influence the outcome of many battles.

According to Chinua Achebe and Vincent Chukwemeka,

Ogbunigwe bombs struck great terror in the hearts of many a Nigerian soldier and were used to great effect by the Biafran Army throughout the conflict...when the history of this war comes to be written, the Ogbunigwe and the shore batteries will receive special mention as Biafras greatest saviours. We have been able to wipe out more Nigerians with Ogbunigwe than with any imported weapon.

As recently as 2010 unexploded ordnance left over from the war recovered and destroyed by Nigerian clearing operations included 646 pieces of live Ogbunigwe bombs and 426 other improvised explosive devices in areas that were formerly Biafra.

== Variants ==
Though the initial Ogbunigwe was a rocket-propelled ground-to-air missile, later in the war, all Biafran-produced explosive devices became known as Ogbunigwe, or Ojukwu bucket in popular language. Some of the specific types of Ogbunigwe that can be identified in the literature include the following:

- Flying Ogbunigwe (rocket): multi-purpose non-guided rocket-propelled missile, initially intended as ground-to-air missile, later converted for use as ground-to-ground, ground-to-ship missile, and anti-tank missile. Although produced in different sizes and calibers, the missiles were generally about 2 meters long, 33 cm in diameter, electrically ignited, propelled by rocket fuel, and launched from a specially constructed launch pad or stand. They carried a conventional high explosive warhead with a design based on the Munroe effect. Smaller calibers were mounted for launch in series on platforms similar to the Russian Katyusha rocket launcher (Stalin's organ) and used by the Biafrans in place of artillery.
- Foot Cutter Ogbunigwe (Landmine): inter-spaced, knee-high lead pipes filled with explosives and shrapnel detonated electrically.
- Bucket Ogbunigwe (landmine): cone filled with explosives and shrapnel, triggered by wire or command detonated.
- Coffin box Ogbunigwe (landmine): larger version of the bucket Ogbunigwe.
- Beer Ogbunigwe (grenade): a bottle filled with shrapnel and explosives, detonates on impact.
