= Second Invasion of Onitsha =

- Part of Biafran War
- Second Invasion of Onitsha (Nigeria)
Date	2 January - 20 March 1968 (2 months, 2 weeks and 4 days)
Location	Onitsha
Result	Nigerian victory

Belligerents
Nigeria	Biafra

Commanders and leaders
Murtala Mohammed; Shehu Musa Yar'Adua	Joseph Achuzie; Timothy Onwuatuegwu; Mike Inveso

Strength
Unknown	Unknown

Casualties and losses
Unknown	Unknown

The Second Invasion of Onitsha (2 January - 20 March 1968) was military conflict between Nigerian and Biafran military forces.

== Background ==
On October 4, 1967, the Nigerian 2nd Division under Col. Murtala Mohammed began an artillery bombardment of Onitsha. After an 8-day offensive a 10 boat armada of Nigerian soldiers crossed the Niger River and forced defending Biafrans to retreat. Instead of pursuing the retreating Biafrans the 2nd Division instead looted the Onitsha market before burning it to the ground. Biafran troops later counter-attacked and managed to destroy the Nigerian beachhead, capturing and killing most Nigerian soldiers. After two more failed attacks on Onitsha Col. Mohammed moved north to cross the Niger River at Idah.

== Invasion ==
In December 1967 the Nigerian 2nd Division under Col. Murtala Mohammed along with the Nigerian 6th Battalion under. Lt. Col. Shehu Musa Yar'Adua crossed the Niger River at Idah and made their way to Enugu. In early January 1968 Col. Mohammed led a two pronged attack in which they encountered the Biafran 53rd Brigade under Maj. Christian Ude, who was re-enforced by European mercenaries, while also attacking the Biafran 12th Battalion under Col. Mike Inveso at Atani, forcing them to retreat. Gen. Mohammed's war machine rolled on, smashing through Biafran made obstacles, including detonated bridges. A few weeks later the French mercenary commander of the Biafran 53rd Brigade was wounded and evacuated. Despite heavy casualties Col. Mohammed's troops stormed Udi followed by Ozala a few days later, cutting off the S Division from the rest of Biafra. Head of State Odumegwu Ojukwu now made Gen. Timothy Onwuatuegwu commander of the S Division. With artillery and aerial assistance the Nigerians rolled on and managed to overrun numerous towns and cities. In the face of overwhelming pressure Biafran soldiers retreat and began to set up defensive positions. On January 19 the Nigerian 2nd Division entered and occupied Biafran Maj. Gen. Alexander Madiebo's hometown, Awka. With the road to Onitsha now open to the Nigerian 2nd Division, Gen. Ojukwu placed the Biafran 11th Division under the command of Maj. Joseph Achuzie. Whenever the Nigerians attacked Maj. Achuzie would counter-attack and this strategy managed to hold off Nigerian troops 22 km outside of Onitsha. On March 20, 1968, Nigerian 2nd Division troops marched through Abagana and finally reached Onitsha. The final battle would last less than 24 hours. Although the Nigerians were forced to pay with heavy casualties, they managed to capture Onitsha while the Biafran 11th Division retreated to Nnewi.

== Aftermath ==
When Biafran soldiers retreated from Onitsha they left the bulk of their equipment to the Nigerians. The city's market was left severely damaged by the fighting, and only about 715 civilians remained.
