= Funsho Ogundipe =

Funsho Ogundipe is a Nigerian pianist, music director, and composer. Ogundipe is known for his work with the Afrobeat band Ayetoro. As the musical director of Ayetoro, he is one of the primary architects of the post-Fela Kuti sound in Afrobeat.

== Musical style ==
Ogundipe is one of the first post-Fela Kuti composers to gain attention for the sophistication of his work, which is influenced primarily by jazz and features a wide and enchanting range of tonal colours.

His main Influences are Miles Davis, Duke Ellington, and Fela Kuti.

== See also ==
- Jazz
- Composer
- Music director
- Shiloh Godson
