= Joseph Achuzie =

Nigerian engineer (1929–2018)

Joseph Achuzia
- Born: 1929; Asaba, British Nigeria
- Died: 26 February 2018 (aged 88–89); Asaba, Nigeria
- Military career
- Allegiance: Nigeria (until 1967); Biafra (1967–1970)
- Service years: 1960s –1970
- Rank: Colonel
- Nickname: Hannibal
- Commands: Biafran 11th Division; Biafran 11th Battalion; Biafran S Division
- Conflicts: Nigerian Civil War; First Invasion of Onitsha; Second Invasion of Onitsha; Invasion of Port Harcourt; Operation OAU; Siege of Owerri; Operation Tail-Wind

Joseph "Hannibal" Achuzia (1929 – 26 February 2018) was a Nigerian British-trained aeronautical engineer who served as a major in the Biafran Army during the Nigerian Civil War.

== Biafra ==
Prior to joining the Biafran Army in May 1967, Achuzia had been an engineer with the Shell Petroleum company based in Port Harcourt. He was amongst the founders and organizers of the civil militia in Portharcourt, and when that outfit was disbanded, joined the Biafran army as a colonel. He had a British wife and a son as of January 1970 when the civil war ended, but fled to the southeast in fear of anti-Igbo sentiment among his fellow soldiers. After Biafran soldiers were forced to retreat across the River Niger Bridge into Onitsha on September 20, 1967, Achuzia was promoted to Major and given command of the Biafran 11th Battalion, responsible for defending the area between Atani and Ndoni from an imminent Nigerian attack. After the Biafran 18th Battalion under Colonel Assam Nsudoh was forced to retreat from Onitsha after 8 days of bloody house-to-house fighting, the 11th Battalion under Maj. Achuzie linked up with the 18th Battalion east of the city and made plans to counter-attack. The 18th Battalion swung south along the Old Market Road while the 11th Battalion under Maj. Achuzie swung north along the New Market Road in a coordinated Pincer movement. The majority of the 5,000 man Nigerian 2nd Division stationed in Onitsha were either massacred or taken prisoner by Achuzia's men. Two separate counter-attacks were made by the Nigerian 2nd Division in the days following the Biafran assault but were both thwarted by the 11th and 18th Battalions stationed in Onitsha. Achuzia was given total control of the Biafran 11th Division on January 19, 1968, by President Ojukwu once the Nigerian 2nd Division under Murtala Mohammed reached Awka, giving the Nigerians a direct route to Onitsha. The 11th Division under Maj. Achuzie managed to hold off the Nigerians for 2 months until an offensive launched on March 20 resulted in the Nigerians breaking through the Biafran defensive lines surrounding the city, the final battle would last less than 24 hours. The Nigerians were forced to pay with heavy casualties but they managed to capture Onitsha and forced the Biafran 11th Division to retreat to Nnewi.

On May 19, 1968, Achuzia was transferred to Port Harcourt and made commander of all Biafran soldiers within the city. Port Harcourt was subjected to heavy Nigerian artillery bombardment while defending Biafran troops fiercely resisted. During five days of heavy fighting, Port Harcourt's airport and army barracks changed hands on numerous occasions but by May 24 most Biafran troops had been pushed out of the city into the surrounding areas. Maj. Achuzia stubbornly continued to fight against the Nigerians before narrowly escaping death after almost being run over by an armored car; it was then that Maj. Achuzia abandoned fighting and retreated to Iguruta. On September 22, 1968, Maj. Achuzia took part in an attempt to re-capture the Obiangwu Airstrip from the Nigerian 22nd and 44th Battalions but was instead forced to retreat. On March 15, 1969, the Biafran S Division under Major Timothy Onwuatuegwu made a frontal assault on the 16th Brigade but was forced to halt after suffering heavy casualties. Maj. Onwuatuegwu placed half of his men under the command of Maj. Achuzia and were able to get within 1 km of the city. Major Achuzie demanded total control of the S Division but was refused by Onwuatuegwu and the two men almost shot each other after drawing their guns. President Ojukwu stepped in and gave Major Achuzie control of the S Division for one week, continuing the frontal assault on Owerri. Achuzia's plan ultimately failed and he retreated after suffering heavy casualties, Ojukwu then immediately restored Onwuatuegwu as commander. On January 9, 1970, President Odumegwu Ojukwu officially placed all remaining Biafran soldiers under the command of Maj. Achuzia and gave his vice president Philip Effiong his title of President. Three days later on January 12 Effiong, Achuzie, and other Biafran officers made their way to Amichi and later Owerri to broadcast their final surrender to General Olusegun Obasanjo.

== Later life and death ==
After Achuzia was released from prison in 1970, he officially retired from military activities and moved to Asaba, his home-town. He lived there until his death from natural causes on 26 February 2018: he was 90 years old.
