= Invasion of Port Harcourt =

- Part of Biafran War
Date	24 May 1968 (2 months, 2 weeks and 2 days)
Location	Port Harcourt, southern Biafra
Result	Nigerian victory

Belligerents
Nigeria	Biafra

Commanders and leaders
E. A. Etuk; Philemon Shande; Ipoola Alani Akinrinade; Ted Hamman	Joseph Achuzie; Ogbugo Kalu

Strength
Unknown	Unknown

Casualties and losses
Unknown	Unknown

The Invasion of Port Harcourt (8 March – 24 May 1968) was a military conflict between Nigerian and Biafran military forces.

== Background ==
In the mid-1960s, there was a military coup led by Major Nzeogwu that overthrew the democratic government which had lost credibility due to rigged elections and ensuing violence. The coup was suppressed but the mostly Igbo coup plotters were not brought to justice by the military junta that took power. The coup seemed ethnically motivated as most of the people killed were Hausa/Fulani and Yoruba, and the military junta was headed by an Igbo man, Maj. Gen. Aguyi Ironsi. There was a counter coup six months later and revenge killings of the Igbo in Hausaland. This led to an exodus of the Igbo back to the southeast and an unfortunate series of events that culminated in secession and the Biafra war.

Before hostilities broke out, the Nigerian Navy was ordered to enforce a blockade around Port Harcourt and the mouth of the Bonny River. The capture of Calabar and other coastal cities by October 1967 left Port Harcourt's airport the only means of international communication and travel for Biafra, though the Biafrans in turn spent time devising other ad hoc air strips out of old roadways. Initially lightly defended by the Biafrans, Port Harcourt was fortified following the capture of Bonny by federal forces. To prevent a federal advance up the river, the Biafrans scuttled a barge and dumped several vehicles into it.

== Battle ==
Following the defeat in the Cross River region, the Biafrans regrouped the remnants of their troops and created the Biafran 12th Division under the command of Lt. Col. Festus Akagha. The 12th Division was divided into the 56th Brigade stationed in Arochukwu and the 58th Brigade stationed in Uyo. On 8 March 1968, the beaches at Oron came under heavy Nigerian aerial and naval bombardment. The Nigerian 33rd Brigade under Col. Ted Hamman overran Biafran defensive positions and continued towards Uyo. Due to the swiftness of the Nigerian advance, Biafran officers began to lose control of their troops. Consequently, hundreds of Biafran troops were cut off and forced to surrender after Nigerian troops stationed at Oron linked up with the Nigerian 16th and 17th Brigade in Uyo. The 16th Brigade under Col. E.A. Etuk and 17th Brigade under Lt. Col. Philemon Shande stormed through Eket and occupied Opobo. With the Biafrans in retreat, the Nigerian 15th Brigade under Col. Ipoola Alani Akinrinade stationed at Bonny launched an attack on Port Harcourt. At the time, Port Harcourt was defended by the Biafran 52nd Brigade under Col. Ogbugo Kalu. After heavy fighting, Nigerian troops captured and dug in at Onne; their success would be short lived. A division of Biafran soldiers under an Italian-born Biafran mercenary unexpectedly counter-attacked, inflicting heavy casualties before forcing the Nigerians to retreat from Onne. The Biafran 14th Battalion stationed in Bori panicked and retreated from the town after spotting Nigerian soldiers wearing the insignia of the Nigerian 14th Brigade. As Biafran lines around Port Harcourt crumbled, a message was sent over Radio Biafra for the defense of the city. On 19 May the Biafran Maj. Joseph Achuzie arrived in Port Harcourt and was made commander of Biafran troops defending the city. Port Harcourt was subjected to heavy Nigerian artillery bombardment while defending Biafran troops fiercely resisted. During five days of heavy fighting, Port Harcourt's airport and army barracks changed hands on numerous occasions but by 24 May most Biafran troops had been pushed out of the city into the surrounding areas. Maj. Achuzie stubbornly continued to fight against the Nigerians before narrowly escaping death after almost being run over by an armored car; it was then that Maj. Achuzie abandoned fighting and retreated to Igrita.

== Aftermath ==
The capture of Port Harcourt completely denied Biafra access to the sea. Nigerian authorities regarded it as a significant victory. General Gowon stated that had Biafra held the port for at least another month, it could have garnered the international recognition of at least a dozen other states. Nigerian forces also gained control of the city's airport, which was used as a forward base to stage air raids into Biafra's interior. The day after Port Harcourt's seizure, Col Adekunle made his famous announcement "I will be able to capture Owerri, Aba, and Umuahia in 2 weeks". That quote then led up to Operation OAU. Nigerian forces weren't able to capture the cities of Owerri and Aba until 1 October 1968, and were unable to capture Umuahia for another year. On 15 January 1970, Biafra surrendered to Nigeria and ended the war.

A large segment of the Igbo population of the city fled in advance of its capture by federal forces into the Biafran interior, abandoning their homes and valuables. Some of those who remained were killed by troops or non-Igbo residents. Many Ijaw people welcomed the arrival of the federal troops and lay claim to some of vacated properties and filled local leadership positions. Following the end of the war, Igbos returned to the city. Many Igbo professionals were needed to manage the oil industry and consequently the oil companies housed them in protected areas and pressured the Nigerian government to guarantee their safety. To promote reconciliation, the Nigerian government guaranteed all Igbos that they could reclaim property they had abandoned during the war upon their return. This proved difficult in Port Harcourt, as the Rivers State government defied federal authorities and refused to evict squatters on Igbo properties. State courts often sided with the squatters, and the Igbo owners perceived this as a state policy of retribution towards them.

== Works cited ==
- Daly, Samuel Fury Childs (2020). A History of the Republic of Biafra: Law, Crime, and the Nigerian Civil War. Cambridge University Press. ISBN 9781108895958.
- Stremlau, John J. (2015). The International Politics of the Nigerian Civil War, 1967-1970. Princeton: Princeton University Press. ISBN 9781400871285.
- Udeagbala, Lawrence Okechukwu (2022). "A Comparative Study of the Nigerian and Biafran Navies During the Nigerian Civil War (1967–70)". African Navies: Historical and Contemporary Perspectives (1st ed.). London: Routledge. pp. 91–108. ISBN 9781003309154.
- Venter, Al J. (2016). Biafra's War 1967-1970 : A Tribal Conflict in Nigeria That Left a Million Dead. Helion & Company. ISBN 9781910294697.
