= Obinze =

Town in Imo State, Nigeria

Coordinates: 5°25′N 6°58′E

Obinze is a community in southeastern Nigeria, located near the city of Owerri, Imo State under the supervision of Owerri West Local Government Area. The community Obinze had six clans/villages but a clan known as Umuanunu got their own autonomous community and separated. It's known for its fast rise in industrialization due to its location along Owerri-Port-harcourt Road, giving hosts/non-indigents access to the Local government area, State capital and neighbouring state such as Abia State, Anambra state and Rivers State. Obinze shares boundaries with Oforola, Avu, Ihiagwa, Eziobodo, Umuokani, Nekede and Mbirichi etc.

== Clans/villages ==
1. Umuagam
2. Obokwu
3. Umekpu
4. Umumeje
5. Umuezoroche

=== Prominent locations in Obinze include ===
1. Headquarters 34 Brigade Nigerian Army, Obinze Barracks Owerri 8 South East
2. Federal University of Technology Owerri (FUTO)
3. Redemption Estate Avu/Obinze

== Investment opportunities ==
Many investment opportunities exist in the community including farming, construction, grain mills, transport, and palm produce industry. Also due to its proximity to nearby state such as Rivers State, Anambra State and Abia State, it makes it easier for manufacturer, producers, marketers and distributors to located their factories, industries and warehouse in and around the community

== Technology growth ==
The community has invested in its indigenes on technological growth by providing constant training's in ICT programs and capacity building for its populace. Also its about establish a Technological Incubator and Information Management Center "TIIMC" to help building a technological framework and database of the community while providing access to information about the community to the World.
