= Operation OAU =

1968 battle of the Biafran War

- Part of Biafran War
- Operation OAU (Nigeria)
Date	2 September–15 October 1968 (1 month, 1 week and 6 days)
Location	Owerri, Aba, and Umuahia, Nigeria
Result	Biafran victory

Belligerents
Nigeria	Biafra

Commanders and leaders
(Nigeria) Benjamin Adekunle (Nigeria) Mohammed Shuwa	(Republic of Biafra) Ogbugo Kalu (Republic of Biafra) Lambert Iheanacho (Republic of Biafra) Joseph Achuzie (Republic of Biafra) Taffy Williams

Strength
35,000	10,000–20,000

Casualties and losses
21,500	Unknown but heavy

Operation OAU (2 September – 15 October 1968) was a battle between Nigerian 3 Marine Commando Division (3MCDO) and Biafran 12 Division in modern day south-eastern Nigeria. Operation OAU was an intermittent battle that may have resulted in over 25,000 deaths on both sides. Although the Biafran soldiers were outnumbered, they were able to retain control of Umuahia and eventually recapture the cities of Owerri and Aba.

== Prelude ==
In April 1968, the Commander of the 3 MCDO, Colonel Benjamin Adekunle began drawing up plans to invade the Biafran heartland and capture all remaining major cities. On 14 April the Nigerian 3rd Marine Division under Colonel Adekunle made their way north from their position in Calabar to Ikot Ekpene where they managed to capture the city after a stubborn Biafran defense. For 36 days the 3rd Division pushed their way west through the Niger Delta and reached the area surrounding Port Harcourt on 19 May. The Nigerian Army and Navy bombarded the city before carrying out an amphibious assault led by the 31st, 32nd and 33rd battalions. This led to the retreat of Biafran forces.

On 30 July Colonel Adekunle began making plans to capture Biafra's remaining major cities, even boldly stating that he would be able to capture Owerri, Aba, and Umuahia in two weeks. In August 1968 the Nigerian Army set up positions along the Aba-Umuahia road and cut off all food shipments from entering the city. Adekunle's strategy for gaining Aba was to surround the city, cut off food shipments, and starve the city into submission. On 24 August two Nigerian battalions and their Soviet advisers crossed the Imo River Bridge and began making their way towards Owerri. The Biafran 4th Commando Brigade under the Welsh mercenary Maj. Taffy Williams threw themselves headfirst against the Nigerian attack. For three days light machine gun and repeater rifle fire did not stop, and neither side gave an inch until the Biafrans ran out of ammunition and were forced to retreat to Aba.

== Invasion ==
On 2 September Nigerian artillery began shelling Aba while ground forces began to enter the city under heavy Biafran fire. For twelve days bloody house-to-house fighting ensued and bodies filled Red Cross hospitals before the final Biafrans surrendered on 14 September. On 13 September the Biafran 14th Division came under heavy artillery fire from the Nigerian 16th Brigade under the command of Colonel E.A. Etuk.

On 17 September the Nigerian 3rd Marine Division began making their way towards Umuahia but were intercepted outside the city by a division of Biafran soldiers and a bloody battle ensued.

On 18 September, after a fierce five-day stand, the Biafran 14th Division abandoned fighting in Ohoba and Obinze and retreated from the city, leaving Owerri open to Col. Etuk's 16th Division. After Owerri's capture Colonel Ogbugo Kalu was made commander of the 14th Division and Col. Lambert Iheanacho was made commander of the 63rd Brigade. In a letter sent from Generalissimo Ojukwu to Col. Kalu he states "Your role in the Port Harcourt disaster is still fresh in the minds of people. You must clear the enemy from Obinze in 24 hours or submit your resignation from the army." Only a few hours later Colonel Kalu ordered a Biafran counterattack and with the assistance of the Ogbunigwe mine the Nigerian advance was halted and Obinze was captured. The 5th, 21st, 22nd, and 44th battalions of the Nigerian 1st Division began making their way northwards towards the Obiangwu airstrip from to axes after overrunning Biafran positions on the banks of the Imo River.

Due to the swiftness of the Nigerian advance the Biafran 63rd Brigade retreated from the Obiangwu airstrip on 22 September, leaving the bulk of its equipment to the Nigerian 22nd and 44th battalions. The same day, the Biafran Maj. Joseph Achuzie attempted a counterattack at the Obiangwu airstrip, but was swiftly repulsed by the Nigerian 22nd Battalion. On 30 September the Nigerian 21st battalion outflanked the defending Biafran 13th Division and captured Okigwe town. In mid-September, the French President Charles de Gaulle openly voiced his support for the Biafran cause and began shipping weapons to Biafra.

The terrain around Umuahia consisted of areas of vast jungles and rivers that were littered with mines and Biafran soldiers. For 14 days, the two sides exchanged gunfire and artillery, resulting in mass casualties on both sides. Adekunle radioed in that he needed reinforcements or his entire 3rd Marine Division would be at risk of annihilation, but they never arrived. Nearly 15,000 Nigerian soldiers had either been killed or wounded in the Umuahia sector, and on 1 October the 3rd Marine Division retreated to Port Harcourt while the 16th Division was left isolated in Owerri. Instead of pursuing the retreating Nigerians to Port Harcourt the Biafrans slowly made their way up the Aba-Umuahia road and managed to capture Aba on 15 October.

== Aftermath ==
Although Shuwa's 1st Division successfully captured Okigwe and the Obiangwu airstrip, the operation resulted in disaster for Adekunle's 3rd Marine Division in which it lost over 20,000 of its 35,000 soldiers, over two thirds of the entire division, and found itself in short supply of both men and food. While Yakubu Gowon was distracted by the anti-tax riots in western Nigeria the Biafran Brigadier Alexander Madiebo encircled Owerri, trapping the 3,000-man Nigerian 16th Division inside the city. For the next several months attacks were launched by Biafran soldiers on Nigerian defensive positions around the city which allowed them to inch closer to Owerri with every battle. On 5 December the Biafrans launched a two-day offensive on Owerri in which 50,000 rounds of ammunition, 300 mortars, 200 howitzer shells, and 20 anti-tank weapons were fired by the Biafrans but the Nigerian 16th Division under Col. Etuk managed to stay put in their original positions. On 15 January 1969 the Biafran 60th Brigade entered Owerri and forced the Nigerians within the city to retreat across the Otamini Bridge. Hungry and half-naked Biafran soldiers discovered the Nigerians’ food and clothing supplies and decided to stay and have their fill while the Nigerians regrouped and launched a counter-attack, causing the Biafrans to retreat. By 31 March 1969 the Biafrans had control over 70% of Owerri while the remaining 300 Nigerian soldiers fled the city on 25 April.
