= Benjamin Adekunle =

Nigerian Army officer

Brigadier Benjamin Adekunle
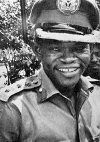
- Brigadier Benjamin Adekunle

General Officer Commanding 3 Infantry Division, Nigerian Army
- In office July 1967 – May 1969
- Succeeded by: O. Obasanjo

Personal details
- Born: 26 June 1936 Kaduna, British Nigeria
- Died: 13 September 2014 (aged 78) Lagos, Nigeria
- Education: Royal Military Academy Sandhurst
- Nickname(s): "The Black Scorpion" "Na Cinema"

Military service
- Allegiance: Nigeria
- Branch/service: Nigerian Army
- Years of service: 1958–1974
- Rank: Brigadier General
- Commands: 3rd Marine Commando Division
- Battles/wars: Congo Crisis; Nigerian Civil War; Bonny Landing; Midwest Invasion of 1967; Operation Tiger Claw; Invasion of Port Harcourt; Operation OAU

Benjamin Adesanya Maja Adekunle (26 June 1936 – 13 September 2014) was a Nigerian military officer and prominent military figure during the Nigerian Civil War.

== Early life and background ==
Adekunle was born in Kaduna. His father was a native of Ogbomosho, while his mother was of the Bachama ethnicity. He underwent secondary education at the Government College, Okene (now known as Abdul Aziz Atta Memorial College, Okene, in present-day Kogi State). He enlisted in the Nigerian Army in 1958 shortly after completing his school certificate examinations. He passed the army selection examinations and thereafter was despatched to the Royal Military Academy Sandhurst in the UK, the British Army's initial officer entry academy. He was commissioned 2nd lieutenant on December 15, 1960. As a platoon commander, he served in Kasai Province of Congo with the 1st Battalion, Queen's Own Nigeria Regiment during his first ONUC UN peace keeping tour of duty. In 1962, Lt. Adekunle became aide-de-camp to the governor of the eastern region, Sir Akanu Ibiam. The following year, as a captain, he was posted back to the Congo as staff captain (A) to the Nigerian Brigade HQ at Luluabourg - under Brigadier Babafemi Ogundipe. In 1964, Major Adekunle attended the Defence Services Staff College at Wellington, in India. When he returned he was briefly appointed adjutant general at the Army Headquarters in May 1965 to replace Lt. Col. Yakubu Gowon, who was proceeding on a course outside the country. However, he later handed over the position to Lt. Col. James Pam and was posted back to his old battalion (1st Battalion) in Enugu as a company commander.

== Nigerian Civil War ==
Adekunle later assumed command of the Lagos Garrison as a substantive lieutenant colonel. When the Nigerian-Biafran War erupted in July 1967, Adekunle was tasked to lead elements which included two new battalions (7th and 8th) - to conduct the historic sea borne assault on Bonny in the Bight of Benin on 26 July 1968 (carried out by Major Isaac Adaka Boro's unit). This happened after the federal government gained confidence of most southwestern ethnic groups as a direct result of Biafran push to mid-west state and probe into Western region. Adekunle was promoted to colonel after the Bonny landing.

The 6th (under Major Jalo) and 8th (under Major Ochefu) battalions of the Lagos Garrison subsequently took part in operations to liberate the Midwest from the Biafran forces in August 1967. The 7th (under Major Abubakar) stayed behind to hold Bonny. Because Major Jalo's Unit was seconded to Lt. Col. Murtala Mohammed's 2nd Division, Adekunle was left with only the 8th Battalion at Escravos. He, therefore, protested to Army HQ and got the Lagos garrison upgraded to Brigade status through the creation of the 31 and 32 Battalions (under Majors Aliyu and Hamman, respectively). This formation, combined with elements of the Lagos garrison along the eastern seaboard, was officially designated the 3 Infantry Division. However, Colonel Adekunle did not think the name "3 Infantry Division" was sensational enough nor did it project the nature of the unique terrain in which his men had to fight. Therefore, without formal approval from Army HQ, he renamed it the " 3 Marine Commando (3MCDO)." The "Black Scorpion" as he came to be known, was easily the most controversial, celebrated and mythologized figure in the war of attrition that laid the foundations for Nigeria's contemporary crisis; and threw a wedge into the national fabric. Benjamin "Adekunle's boys including Godwin Alabi-Isama who was then his Chief of Staff, seized Escravos, Burutu, Urhonigbe, Owa and Aladima. They captured Bomadi and Patani, Youngtown, Koko, Sapele, Ajagbodudu, Warri, Ughelli, Orerokpe, Umutu and Itagba".

== Role after the civil war ==
Benjamin Adekunle was promoted to Brigadier in 1972. After the war Adekunle was put in charge of decongesting the Lagos port that was having a chronic problem of clearing imported goods. He held this position until being compulsorily retired on 20 August 1974.

He attributed his problems during and after the war to his rivals in the army. In various interviews, he said there was always a rumor of coup linked to him until the army authority felt the concern to do something about it. He had large followings in both the army and public at large and was the most popular military commander during the war, apart from Obasanjo, who succeeded him and brought the war to an end with the same 3MC.

Adekunle led the Third Marine Commando Division, and the foreign media frequently turned to him while seeking a human perspective on the Biafran war.

He died on 13 September 2014, and was buried in the Vaults and Gardens, Ikoyi, Lagos.
