= Mohammed Shuwa =

Nigerian Army Major General

Major general Mohammed Shuwa
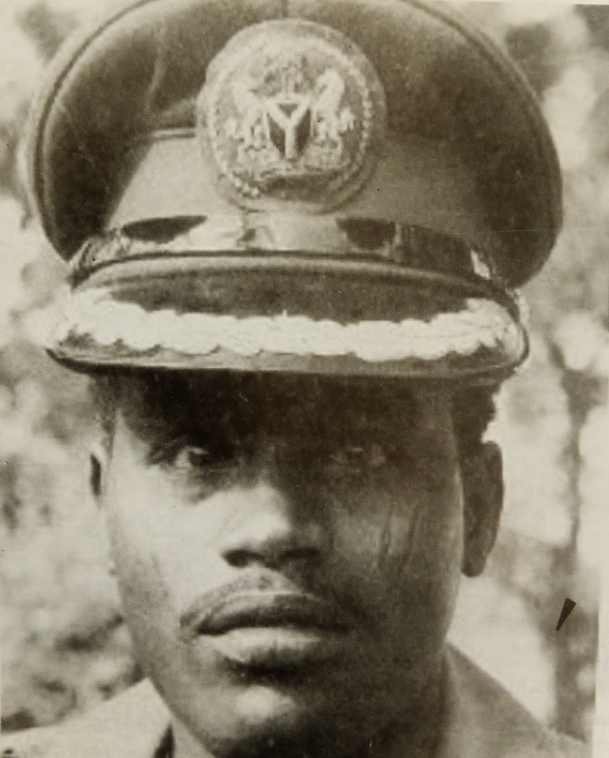
- Shuwa in the 1960s

Federal Commissioner of Trade
- In office 1975–1979
- Succeeded by: Isaac Shaahu as Minister of Commerce

General Officer Commanding of the 1st Division, Nigerian Army
- In office August 1967 – September 1969
- Succeeded by: Brig. I.D. Bisalla

Personal details
- Born: 1 September 1939 Masharte, British Nigeria
- Died: 2 November 2012 (aged 73) Maiduguri, Nigeria
- Education: Barewa College; Regular Officers Special Training School (Teshie); R.M.A. Sandhurst

Military service
- Allegiance: Nigeria
- Branch/service: Nigerian Army
- Years of service: 1958–1979
- Rank: Major general
- Commands: 1st Division; 5th Battalion
- Battles/wars: Nigerian Civil War

Major General Mohammed Shuwa OFR (1 September 1939 – 2 November 2012) was a Nigerian military officer and the first General Officer Commanding of the Nigerian Army's 1st Division. Shuwa commanded the 1st Division during the Nigerian Civil War. He was murdered in Maiduguri by suspected Boko Haram militants on 2 November 2012.

== Background & education ==
Shuwa was born in Masharte, Borno State on 1 September 1939. He attended Kala Elementary School (1946–1947), Bama Central Elementary School (1948–1950), Bornu Middle School (1950–1952), and Barewa College, Zaria for his secondary education (1952–1957). He was classmates with Gen. Murtala Muhammed at Barewa and at subsequent military institutions. Along with Murtala Muhammed and others such as Illiya Bisalla, and Ibrahim Haruna, Shuwa joined the Nigerian Army on 19 September 1958 and pursued his preliminary cadet training at the Regular Officers Special Training School in Teshie, Ghana. He received his commission as a 2nd Lieutenant in July 1961 after completing officer cadet training at the Royal Military Academy Sandhurst.

== Activities during the Nigerian Army mutiny of July 1966 and October Kano massacres ==
=== July 1966 Mutiny ===
Then Lt. Col Shuwa was Commander of the 5th Battalion in Kano during the Nigerian Army Mutiny of July 1966 where many Igbo military officers were systematically murdered by their northern counterparts for what the northern officers perceived as retribution for the January 15, 1966 coup (which was led by mostly Igbo officers). Shuwa's deputy at the 5th Battalion, then Major James Oluleye took the initiative by asking his company commanders to lock up the battalion armory and hand over the armory keys in Olulye's armory safe. As a result of Shuwa and Oluleye's leadership, the lives of many Igbo officers during the July mutiny were saved.

=== October Kano massacre ===
In late September 1966, Shuwa and Oluleye were serendipitously posted away from the 5th Battalion and were replaced by then Major Abba Kyari and Captain Auna. On October 1, 1966, 5th Battalion troops mutinied and opened fire on the parade ground as they were addressed by Major Kyari. The mutineers murdered Captain Auna and their Regimental Sergeant Major Dauda Mumuni while Major Kyari was able to escape and hide off base. The rampaging soldiers broke into the armory and murdered Igbo civilians in Kano including some Igbo refugees about to board a south bound plane. Lt. Colonel Hassan Katsina, military governor of the Northern Region intervened with the assistance of Lt Colonel Shuwa, Major Martin Adamu, and Lieutenant Garba Duba to suppress the mutiny. The quartet was initially overwhelmed by the mutineers and subsequently enlisted the assistance of the Emir of Kano to quell the mutiny.

== Activities during the Nigerian Civil War (1967–1970) ==
As General Officer Commanding of the Nigerian Army's 1 Division during the Civil War, Shuwa opposed Murtala Mohammed's disastrous 2nd Division Onitsha river assault (almost to the point where both men exchanged blows).

Upon Major Kaduna Nzeogwu's death (then a Biafran Lt. Col) at a battle with Nigerian troops in Nsukka, it was then Col. Shuwa who informed Head of State Major-General Yakubu Gowon about Nzeogwu's demise. Despite the fact that Nzeogwu was technically an enemy soldier killed in combat against the Nigerian Army, Gowon ordered that Nzeogwu's body be flown to Kaduna and buried with full military honours, even as the war raged on in the Eastern Region.

== Post Civil War years ==
From 1975 to 1979, Mohammed Shuwa served as Federal Commissioner for Trade and Works. He retired from the Nigerian Army on October 1, 1979, when the military administration of General Olusegun Obasanjo handed over the reins of political power in Nigeria to the democratically elected government of President Shehu Shagari.

== Death ==
Shuwa was murdered in his home in Maiduguri, in northern Nigeria, on 2 November 2012 by suspected Boko Haram militants.

== See also ==
- List of unsolved murders (2000–present)
