= Nigerian Civil War =

1967–1970 war

- Part of the Cold War, the Sino-Soviet split and the decolonisation of Africa
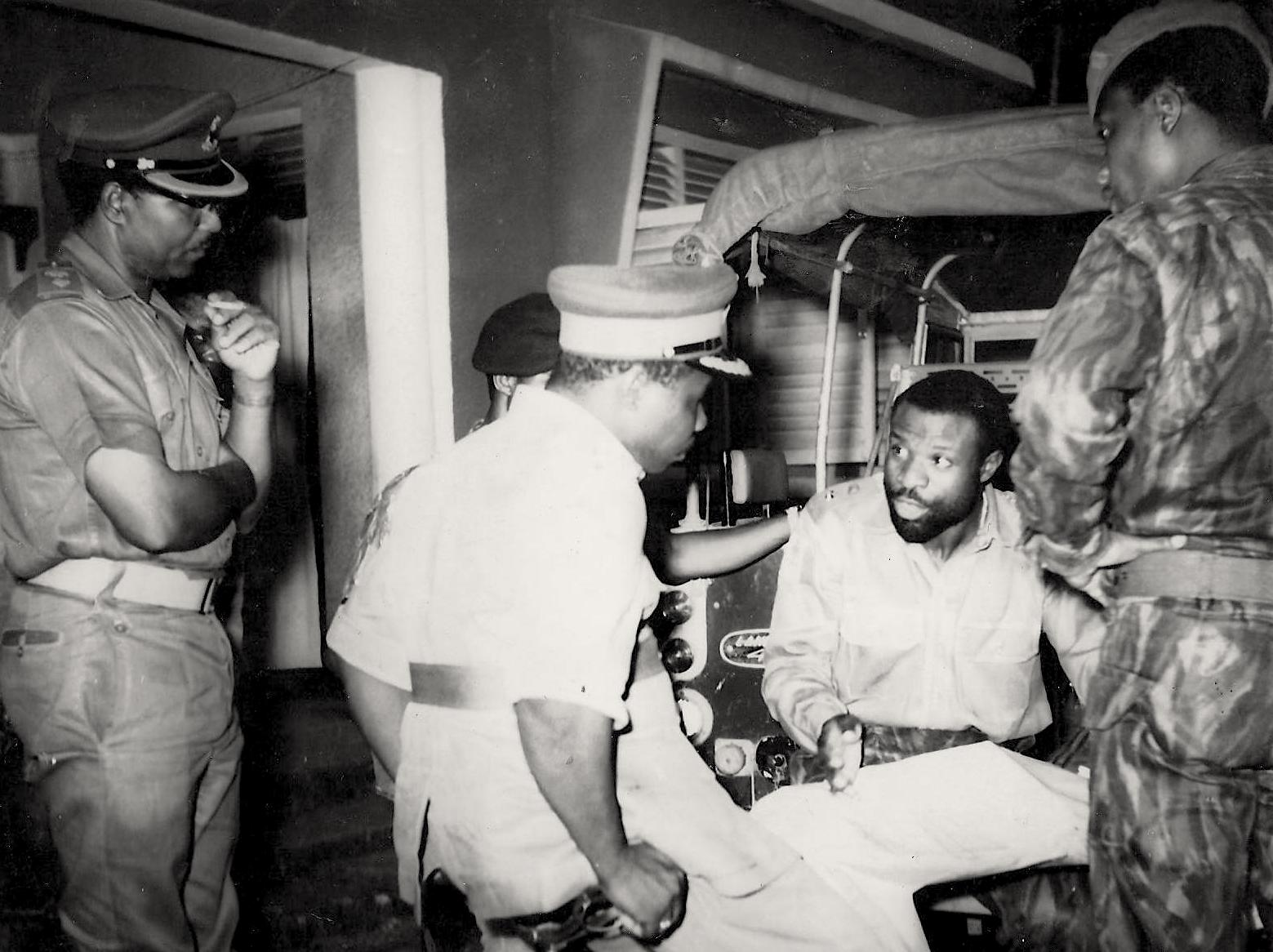
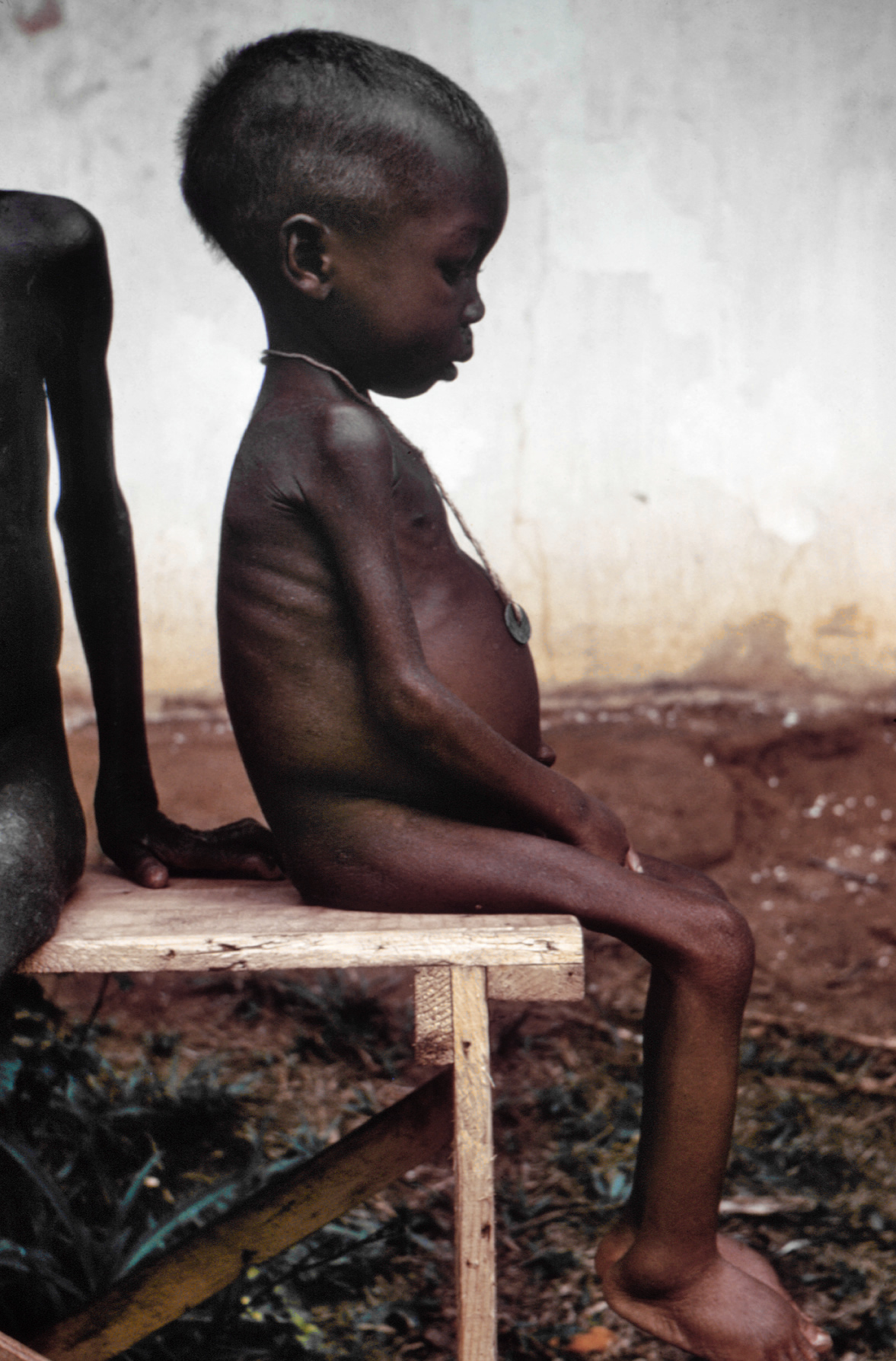
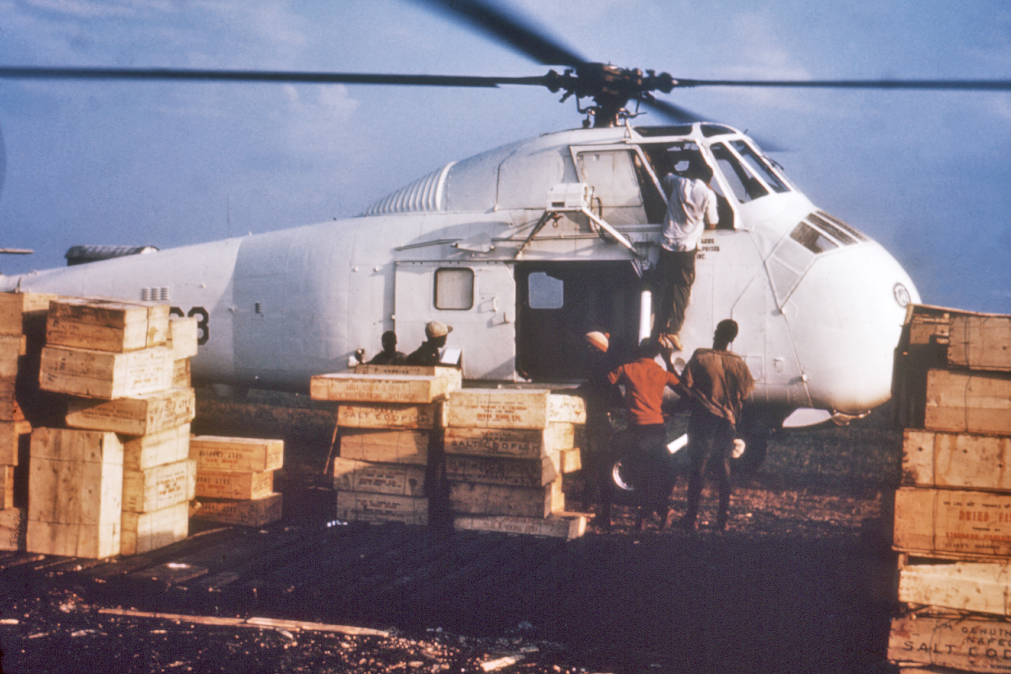
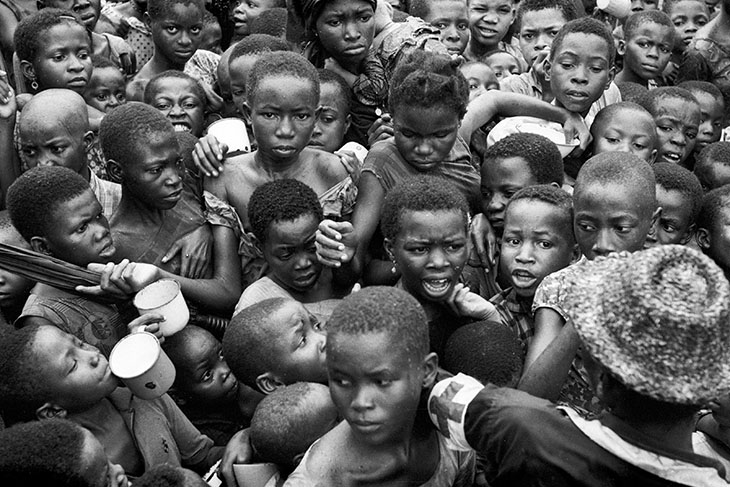
- Clockwise from top left: Brigadier-General Godwin Alabi-Isama of the Nigerian Army (second right) briefing Colonel Olusegun Obasanjo (third right) and Colonel Pedro Martins on the pincer strategy to defeat Biafra; Biafran child suffering from kwashiorkor due to the mass famine caused by the Nigerian blockade of Biafra; Starving children in the civil war; Food aid being unloaded from a helicopter
Date	6 July 1967 – 15 January 1970 (2 years, 6 months, 1 week and 2 days)
Location	Southeastern Nigeria
Result	Nigerian victory: End of 1966 anti-Igbo pogrom
Territorial changes	Dissolution of the Republic of Biafra and Republic of Benin; Reunification of Nigeria

Belligerents
Nigeria; United Arab Republic (Note: Provided close air support in support of Nigeria); Support: United Kingdom; Soviet Union; Ethiopia	Biafra; Republic of Benin (1967); Support: Tanzania; Zambia; Gabon; Ivory Coast; Covert support: France; China; Portugal; Israel; South Africa; Rhodesia; Czechoslovakia

Commanders and leaders
Yakubu Gowon; J. E. A. Wey; Joseph Akahan †; Hassan Katsina; Emmanuel Ikwue; Murtala Mohammed; Olusegun Obasanjo; Benjamin Adekunle; Mohammed Shuwa; Theophilus Danjuma; Gamal Abdel Nasser	Chukwuemeka Odumegwu Ojukwu; Philip Effiong (surrendered); Alexander Madiebo (surrendered); Ogbugo Kalu (surrendered); Timothy Onwuatuegwu †; Joseph Achuzia (surrendered); Victor Banjo (executed); Mercenary commanders: (West Germany) Rolf Steiner; (Union of South Africa) Taffy Williams; (Polish People's Republic) Jan Zumbach; (Sweden) Carl Gustaf von Rosen; (Canada) Lynn Garrison; (Belgium) Marc Goosens †

Units involved
Nigerian Armed Forces United Arab Republic Air Force	Biafran Armed Forces: Foreign mercenaries

Strength
85,000–150,000 (1967); 200,000–250,000 (1970)	10,000–100,000 (1967); 110,000 (1968); 50,000–100,000 (1970)

Casualties and losses
- 45,000–100,000 combatants killed 500,000 – 3 million Biafran civilians, mostly children and women, died by starvation. According to modern experts, the death toll of the Nigerian Civil War is estimated to be between "500,000 to one million lives" from famine during the Nigerian naval blockade. 2,000,000–4,500,000 displaced, 500,000 of whom fled abroad

The Nigerian Civil War (6 July 1967 – 15 January 1970), also known as the Biafran War, Nigeria–Biafra War, or Biafra War, was an armed conflict fought between Nigeria and the Republic of Biafra, a secessionist state that had declared its independence from Nigeria in 1967. During the war years, General Yakubu Gowon served as the head of state of Nigeria, while Biafra was led by Lieutenant Colonel Chukwuemeka "Emeka" Odumegwu Ojukwu. The conflict emerged from political, ethnic, cultural, and religious tensions that preceded the United Kingdom's formal decolonisation of Nigeria from 1960 to 1963. Immediate causes of the war in 1966 included a military coup, a counter-coup, and anti-Igbo pogroms in the Northern Region. As a consequence of these pogroms, alongside the mass exodus of surviving Igbos from the Northern Region to the Igbo homelands in the Eastern Region, the leadership of the Eastern Region concluded that the Nigerian federal government was either unwilling or unable to guarantee them an adequate protection, therefore, the only remaining solution seemed to be to guarantee their compatriots' security by establishing a sovereign and independent country of Biafra.

Within a year, Nigerian government troops surrounded Biafra, while capturing coastal oil facilities and the city of Port Harcourt. In the aftermath of the Nigerian military's encirclement of the major part of Biafra, a blockade was imposed as a deliberate policy during the ensuing stalemate, which led to the mass starvation of Biafran civilians. During the 2 1/2 years of the war, there were approximately 100,000 overall military casualties, while between 500,000 to 2 million Biafran civilians died of starvation.

Alongside the concurrent Vietnam War, the Nigerian Civil War was one of the first wars in human history to be televised to a global audience. In mid-1968, images of malnourished and starving Biafran children saturated the mass media of Western countries. The plight of the starving Biafrans became a cause célèbre in foreign countries, enabling a significant rise in the funding and prominence of international non-governmental organisations (NGOs). Additionally, Biafra received international humanitarian aid from civilians during the Biafran airlift, an event which inspired the formation of Doctors Without Borders following the end of the war. The United Kingdom and the Soviet Union were the main supporters of the Nigerian government, while France, Ivory Coast, and Gabon supported Biafra. The official position of the United States was one of neutrality, considering Nigeria as "a responsibility of Britain", but some interpreted the refusal to recognise Biafra as favouring the Nigerian government.

The war highlighted challenges within pan-Africanism during the early stages of African independence from colonial rule, suggesting that the diverse nature of African people may present obstacles to achieving common unity. Additionally, it shed light on initial shortcomings within the Organization of African Unity. The war also resulted in the political marginalization of the Igbo people, as Nigeria has not had another Igbo president since the end of the war. Additionally, the $20 dollar policy, which reduced Igbo savings to $20 dollars and abandoned housing policy, which allowed Igbo homes to be seized and claimed by looters are some of the many policies that drive observers to argue that nigeria is implementing a policy of oppression against Igbos Igbo nationalism has emerged since the end of the war, as well as various neo-Biafran secessionist groups such as the Indigenous People of Biafra and Movement for the Actualization of the Sovereign State of Biafra.

== Background ==
=== Ethnic division ===
This civil war can be connected to the colonial amalgamation in 1914 of the British Northern Protectorate, Lagos Colony, and Southern Nigeria Protectorate, which was intended for better administration due to the proximity of these protectorates. However, the change did not take into consideration the differences in the culture and religions of the people in each area. Competition for political and economic power exacerbated tensions.

Nigeria gained independence from the United Kingdom on 1 October 1960, with a population of 45.2 million made up of more than 300 diverse ethnic and cultural groups. When the colony of Nigeria was created, its three largest ethnic groups were the Igbo, who formed about 60–70% of the population in the southeast; the Hausa-Fulani of the Sokoto Caliphate, who formed about 67% of the population in the northern part of the territory; and the Yoruba, who formed about 75% of the population in the southwest. Although these groups have their homelands, by the 1960s, the people were dispersed across Nigeria, with all three ethnic groups represented substantially in major cities. When the war broke out in 1967, there were still more than 5,000 Igbos in Lagos.

The semi-feudal and Muslim Hausa-Fulani in the north were traditionally ruled by a conservative Islamic hierarchy consisting of emirs who in turn owed their ultimate allegiance to the Sultan of Sokoto, whom they regarded as the source of all political power and religious authority. Apart from the Hausa-Fulani, the Kanuri were another dominant majority Muslim ethnic group that had key figures in the war. They made up about 5% of Nigeria's population and were the dominant ethnic group in the north-east. They historically successfully resisted the Sokoto Caliphate during the 19th century through their millennium-long Kanem-Bornu empire. The southernmost part of the region, known as the Middle Belt, had large Christian and Animist populations. Through missionary activities and the 'Northernisation' policy of the Regional Government, the sub-region had a significant share of Eurocentric-educated population. Several senior military and political commanders on the Nigerian side of the war originated from this sub-region, such as Yakubu Gowon and Theophilus Danjuma, both of whom were Christians.

The Yoruba political system in the southwest, like that of the Hausa-Fulani, also consisted of a series of monarchs, the Obas. The Yoruba monarchs, however, were less autocratic than those in the north. The political and social system of the Yoruba accordingly allowed for greater upward mobility, based on acquired rather than inherited wealth and title. The Yoruba were major victims of the Atlantic Slave Trade in the first half of the 19th century, due to the instability caused by the decline and collapse of the Oyo Empire.

In contrast to the two other groups, Igbos in the southeast lived in autonomous, democratically organised communities. Unlike the other two regions, decisions within the Igbo communities were made by a general assembly in which men and women participated. Considering this participation by women in this civil war, the study Female fighters and the fates of rebellions: How mobilizing women influences conflict duration by Reed M. Wood observed that there was a correlation between the duration of wars between rebel groups and the number of women that participated within the conflict at hand. In discussing the correlation between conflicts of longer duration and a high rate of participation of women, the study suggests that gender norms and the general ways in which "an armed group recruits as well as who it recruits may subsequently influence its behaviors during the conflict and the manner in which the conflict unfolds."

The differing political systems and structures reflected and produced divergent customs and values. The Hausa-Fulani commoners, having contact with the political system only through a village head designated by the emir or one of his subordinates, did not view political leaders as amenable to influence. Political decisions were to be submitted to. As with many other authoritarian religious and political systems, leadership positions were given to persons willing to be subservient and loyal to superiors. A chief function of this political system in this context was to maintain conservative values, which caused many Hausa-Fulani to view economic and social innovation as subversive or sacrilegious.

In contrast to the Hausa-Fulani, the Igbos and other Biafrans often participated directly in the decisions that affected their lives. Furthermore, they had a lively awareness of the political system, regarding it as instrumental for achieving their personal goals. Status was acquired through the ability to arbitrate disputes that might arise in the village, and through acquiring rather than inheriting wealth. The Igbo had been substantially victimised in the Atlantic slave trade; in the year 1790, it was reported that of 20,000 people sold each year from Bonny, 16,000 were Igbo. With their emphasis upon social achievement and political participation, the Igbo adapted to and challenged colonial rule in innovative ways.

These tradition-derived differences were perpetuated and perhaps enhanced by the colonial government in Nigeria. In the north, the colonial government found it convenient to rule indirectly through the emirs, thus perpetuating rather than changing the indigenous authoritarian political system. Christian missionaries were excluded from the north, and the area thus remained virtually closed to European cultural influence. By contrast, the richest of the Igbo often sent their sons to British universities, with the intention of preparing them to work with the British. During the ensuing years, the northern emirs maintained their traditional political and religious institutions while reinforcing their social structure. At the time of independence in 1960, the north was by far the most underdeveloped area in Nigeria. It had an English literacy rate of 2%, as compared to 19.2% in the east (literacy in Ajami, local languages in Arabic script, learned in connection with religious education, was much higher). Additionally, the western part of the country also enjoyed a much higher literacy level, as it was the first part of the country to have contact with Western education and established a free primary education program under the pre-independence Western Regional Government.

In the west, the missionaries rapidly introduced Western forms of education. Consequently, the Yoruba were the first group in Nigeria to adopt Western bureaucratic social norms. They made up the first classes of African civil servants, doctors, lawyers, and other technicians and professionals.

Missionaries were introduced at a later date in eastern areas because the British experienced difficulty establishing firm control over the highly autonomous communities there. However, the Igbo and other Biafran people actively embraced Western education, and they overwhelmingly came to adopt Christianity. Population pressure in the Igbo homeland, combined with aspirations for monetary wages, drove thousands of Igbos to other parts of Nigeria in search of work. By the 1960s, Igbo political culture was more unified and the region relatively prosperous, with tradesmen and literate elites active not just in the traditionally Igbo east, but throughout Nigeria. By 1966, the traditional ethnic and religious differences between northerners and the Igbo were exacerbated by new differences in education and economic class.

=== Politics and economics of federalism ===
The colonial administration divided Nigeria into three regions—North, West, and East—something which exacerbated the already well-developed economic, political, and social differences among Nigeria's different ethnic groups. The country was divided in such a way that the North had a slightly higher population than the other two regions combined. There were also widespread reports of fraud during Nigeria's first census, and even today, population remains a highly political issue in Nigeria. On this basis, the Northern Region was allocated a majority of the seats in the Federal Legislature established by the colonial authorities. Within each of the three regions the dominant ethnic groups, the Hausa-Fulani, Yoruba, and Igbo, respectively formed political parties that were largely regional and based on ethnic allegiances: the Northern People's Congress (NPC) in the North; the Action Group in the West (AG); and the National Council of Nigeria and the Cameroons (NCNC) in the East. Although these parties were not exclusively homogeneous in terms of their ethnic or regional make-up, the disintegration of Nigeria resulted largely from the fact that these parties were primarily based in one region and one tribe.

The basis of modern Nigeria was formed in 1914 when the United Kingdom amalgamated the Northern and Southern protectorates. Beginning with the Northern Protectorate, the British implemented a system of indirect rule, in which they exerted influence through alliances with local forces. This system worked so well that Colonial Governor Frederick Lugard successfully lobbied to extend it to the Southern Protectorate through amalgamation. In this way, a foreign and hierarchical system of governance was imposed on the Igbos. Intellectuals began to agitate for greater rights and independence. The size of this intellectual class increased significantly in the 1950s, with the massive expansion of the national education program. During the 1940s and 1950s, the Igbo and Yoruba parties were at the forefront of the campaign for independence from British rule. Northern leaders, fearful that independence would mean political and economic domination by the more Westernized elites in the South, preferred the continuation of British rule. As a condition for accepting independence, they demanded that the country continue to be divided into three regions, with the North having a clear majority. Igbo and Yoruba leaders, anxious to obtain an independent country at all costs, accepted the Northern demands.

However, the two Southern regions had significant cultural and ideological differences, leading to discord between the two Southern political parties. Firstly, the AG favoured a loose confederacy of regions in the emergent Nigerian nation, whereby each region would be in total control of its own distinct territory. The status of Lagos was a sore point for the AG, which did not want Lagos, a Yoruba town situated in Western Nigeria (which was at that time the federal capital and seat of national government), to be designated as the capital of Nigeria, if it meant loss of Yoruba sovereignty. The AG insisted that Lagos must be completely recognised as a Yoruba town without any loss of identity, control, or autonomy by the Yoruba. Contrary to this position, the NCNC was anxious to declare Lagos, by virtue of it being the "Federal Capital Territory" as "no man's land"—a declaration which as could be expected angered the AG, which offered to help fund the development of another territory in Nigeria as "Federal Capital Territory" and then threatened secession from Nigeria if it didn't get its way. The threat of secession by the AG was tabled, documented, and recorded in numerous constitutional conferences, including the constitutional conference held in London in 1954, with the demand that a right of secession be enshrined in the constitution of the emerging Nigerian nation to allow any part of the emergent nation to opt out of Nigeria, should the need arise. This proposal for the inclusion of the right of secession by the regions in independent Nigeria by the AG was rejected and resisted by NCNC, which vehemently argued for a tightly bound united/unitary structured nation because it viewed the provision of a secession clause as detrimental to the formation of a unitary Nigerian state. In the face of sustained opposition by the NCNC delegates, later joined by the NPC and backed by threats to view maintenance of the inclusion of secession by the AG as treasonable by the British, the AG was forced to renounce its position of inclusion of the right of secession a part of the Nigerian constitution. Had such a provision been made in the Nigerian constitution, later events which led to the Nigerian/Biafran civil war may have been avoided. The pre-independence alliance between the NCNC and the NPC against the aspirations of the AG would later set the tone for political governance of independent Nigeria by the NCNC/NPC and lead to disaster in later years in Nigeria.

Northern–Southern tension manifested firstly in the 1945 Jos riots and again on 1 May 1953, as fighting in the Northern city of Kano. The political parties tended to focus on building power in their own regions, resulting in an incoherent and disunified dynamic in the federal government.

In 1946, the British divided the Southern Region into the Western Region and the Eastern Region. Each government was entitled to collect royalties from resources extracted within its area. This changed in 1956 when Shell-BP found large petroleum deposits in the Eastern region. A Commission led by Sir Jeremy Raisman and Ronald Tress determined that resource royalties would now enter a "Distributable Pools Account" with the money split between different parts of government (50% to region of origin, 20% to federal government, 30% to other regions). To ensure continuing influence, the British government promoted unity in the Northern bloc and secessionist sentiments among and within the two Southern regions. The Nigerian government, following independence, promoted discord in the West with the creation of a new Mid-Western Region in an area with oil potential. The new constitution of 1946 also proclaimed that "The entire property in and control of all mineral oils, in, under, or upon any lands, in Nigeria, and of all rivers, streams, and watercourses throughout Nigeria, is and shall be vested in, the Crown." The United Kingdom profited significantly from a fivefold rise in Nigerian exports amidst the post-war economic boom.

== Independence and First Republic ==
Nigeria gained independence on 1 October 1960, and the First Republic came to be on 1 October 1963. The first prime minister of Nigeria, Abubakar Tafawa Balewa, was a northerner and co-founder of the Northern People's Congress. He formed an alliance with the National Council of Nigeria and the Cameroons party, and its popular nationalist leader Nnamdi "Zik" Azikiwe, who became Governor General and then President. The Yoruba-aligned Action Group, the third major party, played the opposition role.

Workers became increasingly aggrieved by low wages and bad conditions, especially when they compared their lot to the lifestyles of politicians in Lagos. Most wage earners lived in the Lagos area, and many lived in overcrowded dangerous housing. Labour activity including strikes intensified in 1963, culminating in a nationwide general strike in June 1964. Strikers disobeyed an ultimatum to return to work and at one point were dispersed by riot police. Eventually, they did win wage increases. The strike included people from all ethnic groups. Retired Brigadier General H. M. Njoku later wrote that the general strike heavily exacerbated tensions between the Army and ordinary civilians and put pressure on the Army to take action against a government which was widely perceived as corrupt.

The 1964 elections, which involved heavy campaigning all year, brought ethnic and regional divisions into focus. Resentment of politicians ran high, and many campaigners feared for their safety while touring the country. The Army was repeatedly deployed to Tiv Division, killing hundreds and arresting thousands of Tiv people agitating for self-determination.

Widespread reports of fraud tarnished the election's legitimacy. Westerners especially resented the political domination of the Northern People's Congress, many of whose candidates ran unopposed in the election. Violence spread throughout the country, and some began to flee the North and West, some to Dahomey. The apparent domination of the political system by the North, and the chaos breaking out across the country, motivated elements within the military to consider decisive action.

In addition to Shell-BP, the British reaped profits from mining and commerce. The British-owned United Africa Company alone controlled 41.3% of all Nigeria's foreign trade. At 516,000 barrels per day, Nigeria had become the tenth-biggest oil exporter in the world.

Though the Nigeria Regiment had fought for the United Kingdom in both the First and Second World Wars, the army Nigeria inherited upon independence in 1960 was an internal security force designed and trained to assist the police in putting down challenges to authority rather than to fight a war. The Indian historian Pradeep Barua called the Nigerian Army in 1960 "a glorified police force", and even after independence, the Nigerian military retained the role it held under the British in the 1950s. The Nigerian Army did not conduct field training, and notably lacked heavy weapons. Before 1948, Nigerians were not allowed to hold officer's commissions, and only in 1948 were certain promising Nigerian recruits allowed to attend Sandhurst for officer training while at the same time Nigerian NCOs were allowed to become officers if they completed a course in officer training at Mons Hall or Eaton Hall in England. Despite the reforms, only an average of two Nigerians per year were awarded officers' commissions between 1948 and 1955 and only seven per year from 1955 to 1960. At the time of independence in 1960, of the 257 officers commanding the Nigeria Regiment which became the Nigerian Army, only 57 were Nigerians.

Using the "martial races" theory first developed under the Raj in 19th-century India, the colonial government had decided that peoples from northern Nigeria such as the Hausa, Tiv, and Kanuri were the hard "martial races" whose recruitment was encouraged while the peoples from southern Nigeria such as the Igbos and the Yoruba were viewed as too soft to make for good soldiers and hence their recruitment was discouraged. As a result, by 1958, men from northern Nigeria made up 62% of the Nigeria Regiment while men from the south and the west made up only 36%. In 1958, the policy was changed: henceforward men from the north would make up only 50% of the soldiers while men from the southeast and southwest were each to make up 25%. The new policy was retained after independence. The previously favoured northerners whose egos had been stoked by being told by their officers that they were the tough and hardy "martial races" greatly resented the change in recruitment policies, all the more as after independence in 1960 there were opportunities for Nigerian men to serve as officers that had not existed prior to independence. As men from the southeast and southwest were generally much better educated than men from the north, they were much more likely to be promoted to officers in the newly founded Nigerian Army, which provoked further resentment from the northerners. At the same time, as a part of Nigerianisation policy, it was government policy to send home the British officers who had been retained after independence by promoting as many Nigerians as possible, until by 1966 there were no more British officers. As part of the Nigerianisation policy, educational standards for officers were drastically lowered with only a high school diploma being necessary for an officer's commission while at the same time Nigerianisation resulted in an extremely youthful officer corps, full of ambitious men who disliked the Sandhurst graduates who served in the high command as blocking further chances for promotion. A group of Igbo officers formed a conspiracy to overthrow the government, seeing the northern prime minister, Sir Abubakar Tafawa Balewa, as allegedly plundering the oil wealth of the southeast.

=== Military coups ===
On 15 January 1966, Major Chukuma Kaduna Nzeogwu, Major Emmanuel Ifeajuna, and other junior Army officers (mostly majors and captains) attempted a coup d'état. The two major political leaders of the north, the Prime Minister, Sir Abubakar Tafawa Balewa and the Premier of the northern region, Sir Ahmadu Bello were killed by Major Nzeogwu. Also murdered was Bello's wife and officers of Northern extraction. The President, Sir Nnamdi Azikiwe, an Igbo, was on an extended vacation in the West Indies. He did not return until days after the coup. There was widespread suspicion that the Igbo coup plotters had tipped him and other Igbo leaders off regarding the pending coup. In addition to the killings of the Northern political leaders, the Premier of the Western region, Ladoke Akintola and Yoruba senior military officers were also killed. This "Coup of the Five Majors" has been described in some quarters as Nigeria's only revolutionary coup. This was the first coup in the short life of Nigeria's nascent second democracy. Claims of electoral fraud were one of the reasons given by the coup plotters. Besides killing much of Nigeria's elite, the Coup also saw much of the leadership of the Nigerian Federal Army killed with seven officers holding the rank above colonel killed. Of the seven officers killed, four were northerners, two were from the southeast and one was from the Midwest. Only one was an Igbo.

This coup was, however, not seen as a revolutionary coup by other sections of Nigerians, especially in the Northern and Western sections and by later revisionists of Nigerian coups. Some alleged, mostly from Eastern part of Nigeria, that the majors sought to spring Action Group leader Obafemi Awolowo out of jail and make him head of the new government. Their intention was to dismantle the Northern-dominated power structure but their efforts to take power were unsuccessful. Johnson Aguiyi-Ironsi, an Igbo and loyalist head of the Nigerian Army, suppressed coup operations in the South and he was declared head of state on 16 January after the surrender of the majors.

In the end though, the majors were not in the position to embark on this political goal. While their 15th January coup succeeded in seizing political control in the north, it failed in the south, especially in the Lagos-Ibadan-Abeokuta military district where loyalist troops led by army commander Johnson Aguyi-Ironsi succeeded in crushing the revolt. Apart from Ifeajuna who fled the country after the collapse of their coup, the other two January Majors, and the rest of the military officers involved in the revolt, later surrendered to the loyalist High Command and were subsequently detained as a federal investigation of the event began.

Aguyi-Ironsi suspended the constitution and dissolved parliament. He abolished the regional confederated form of government and pursued unitary policies favoured by the NCNC, having apparently been influenced by NCNC political philosophy. He, however, appointed Colonel Hassan Katsina, son of Katsina emir Usman Nagogo, to govern the Northern Region, indicating some willingness to maintain cooperation with this bloc. He also preferentially released northern politicians from jail (enabling them to plan his forthcoming overthrow). Aguyi-Ironsi rejected a British offer of military support but promised to protect British interests.

Ironsi fatally did not bring the failed plotters to trial as required by then-military law and as advised by most northern and western officers, rather, coup plotters were maintained in the military on full pay, and some were even promoted while awaiting trial. The coup, despite its failures, was seen by many as primarily benefiting the Igbo peoples, as the plotters received no repercussions for their actions and no significant Igbo political leaders were affected. While those that executed the coup were mostly Northern, most of the known plotters were Igbo and the military and political leadership of Western and Northern regions had been largely bloodily eliminated while the Eastern military/political leadership was largely untouched. However, Ironsi, himself an Igbo, was thought to have made numerous attempts to please Northerners. The other events that also fuelled suspicions of a so-called "Igbo conspiracy" were the killing of Northern leaders, and the killing of the Brigadier-General Ademulegun's pregnant wife by the coup executioners. Among the Igbo people, reaction to the coup was mixed.

Despite the overwhelming contradictions of the coup being executed by mostly Northern soldiers (such as John Atom Kpera, later military governor of Benue State), the killing of Igbo soldier Lieutenant-Colonel Arthur Unegbe by coup executioners, and Ironsi's termination of an Igbo-led coup, the ease by which Ironsi stopped the coup led to suspicion that the Igbo coup plotters planned all along to pave the way for Ironsi to take the reins of power in Nigeria.

Colonel Odumegwu Ojukwu became military governor of the Eastern Region at this time. On 24 May 1966, the military government issued Unification Decree #34, which would have replaced the federation with a more centralised system. The Northern bloc found this decree intolerable.

In the face of provocation from the Eastern media which repeatedly showed humiliating posters and cartoons of the slain northern politicians, on the night of 29 July 1966, northern soldiers at Abeokuta barracks mutinied, thus precipitating a counter-coup, which had already been in the planning stages. Ironsi was on a visit to Ibadan during their mutiny and there he was killed (along with his host, Adekunle Fajuyi). The counter-coup led to the installation of Lieutenant-Colonel Yakubu Gowon as Supreme Commander of the Nigerian Armed Forces. Gowon was chosen as a compromise candidate. He was a Northerner, a Christian, from a minority tribe, and had a good reputation within the army.

It seems that Gowon immediately faced not only a potential standoff with the East, but secession threats from the Northern and even the Western region. The counter-coup plotters had considered using the opportunity to withdraw from the federation themselves. Ambassadors from the United Kingdom and the United States, however, urged Gowon to maintain control over the whole country. Gowon followed this plan, repealing the Unification Decree, announcing a return to the federal system.

=== Persecution of Igbo ===
After the January coup, Igbos in the North were accused of taunting their hosts on the loss of their leaders. A popular example was Celestine Ukwu, a popular Igbo musician, who released a song titled "Ewu Ne Ba Akwa" (Goats Are Crying) apparently mocking the late Ahmadu Bello. These provocations were so pervasive that they warranted the promulgation of Decree 44 of 1966 banning them by the military government.

The first president of Nigeria Nnamdi Azikiwe who was away during the first coup noted:

Some Ibo elements, who were domiciled in Northern Nigeria taunted northerners by defaming their leaders through means of records or songs or pictures. They also published pamphlets and postcards, which displayed a peculiar representation of certain northerners, living or dead, in a manner likely to provoke disaffection.

From June through October 1966, pogroms in the North killed an estimated 10,000 to 30,000 Igbo, half of them children, and caused more than a million to two million to flee to the Eastern Region. 29 September 1966 became known as 'Black Thursday', as it was considered the worst day of the massacres.

Ethnomusicologist Charles Keil, who was visiting Nigeria in 1966, recounted:

The pogroms I witnessed in Makurdi, Nigeria (late Sept. 1966) were foreshadowed by months of intensive anti-Igbo and anti-Eastern conversations among Tiv, Idoma, Hausa and other Northerners resident in Makurdi, and, fitting a pattern replicated in city after city, the massacres were led by the Nigerian army. Before, during and after the slaughter, Col. Gowon could be heard over the radio issuing 'guarantees of safety' to all Easterners, all citizens of Nigeria, but the intent of the soldiers, the only power that counts in Nigeria now or then, was painfully clear. After counting the disemboweled bodies along the Makurdi road I was escorted back to the city by soldiers who apologised for the stench and explained politely that they were doing me and the world a great favor by eliminating Igbos.

Professor of History Murray Last, who was in Zaria city on the day after the first coup, describes his experience on that day:

And the day after the coup – January 16th 1966 – there was initially so much open relief on the ABU campus that it shocked me. It was only later, when I was living within Zaria city (at Babban Dodo), that I encountered the anger at the way Igbo traders (and journalists) were mocking their Hausa fellow traders in Zaria's Sabon Gari over the death of their 'father', and were pushing aside various motorpark workers elsewhere, telling the Hausa that the rules had now all changed and it was the Hausa who were now the underlings in market or motorpark.

The Federal Military Government also laid the groundwork for the economic blockade of the Eastern Region which went into full effect in 1967.

== Breakaway ==
The new republic adopted the Flag of Biafra which was unveiled on 30 May 1967.

The deluge of refugees in Eastern Nigeria created a difficult situation. Extensive negotiations took place between Ojukwu, representing Eastern Nigeria, and Gowon, representing the Nigerian Federal military government. In the Aburi Accord, finally signed at Aburi, Ghana, the parties agreed that a looser Nigerian federation would be implemented. Gowon delayed announcement of the agreement and eventually reneged.

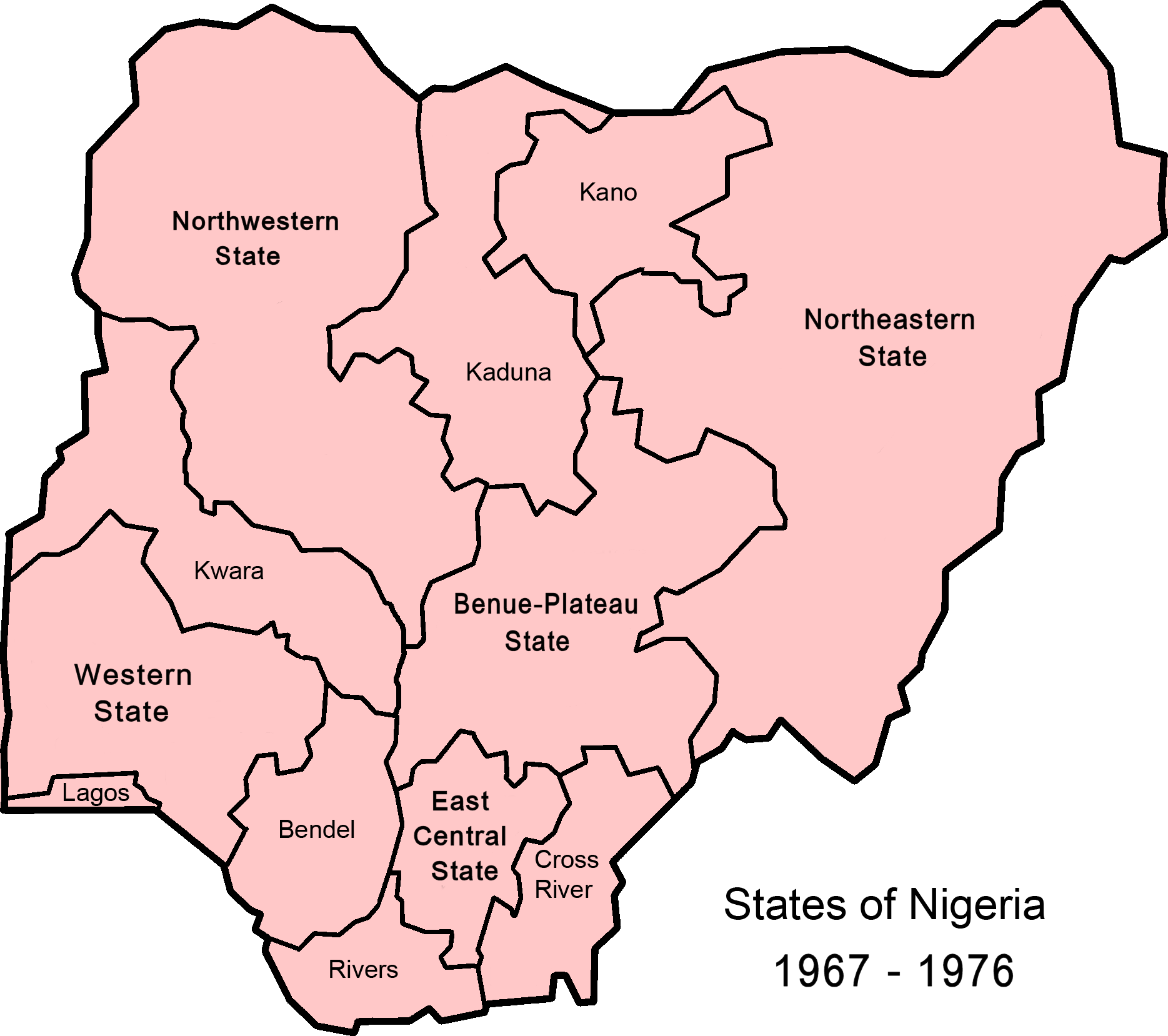
The proposed break-up of the East, West and Northern regions following Gowon's military decree.

On 27 May 1967, Gowon proclaimed the division of Nigeria into twelve states. This decree carved the Eastern Region in three parts: South-Eastern State, Rivers State, and East Central State. Now the Igbos, concentrated in the East Central State, would lose control over most of the petroleum, located in the other two areas.

On 30 May 1967, Ojukwu declared independence and renamed the entire Eastern Region 'the Republic of Biafra'.

The Federal Military Government immediately placed an embargo on all shipping to and from Biafra—but not on oil tankers. Biafra quickly moved to collect oil royalties from oil companies doing business within its borders. When Shell-BP acquiesced to this request at the end of June, the Federal Government extended its blockade to include oil. The blockade, which most foreign actors accepted, played a decisive role in putting Biafra at a disadvantage from the beginning of the war.

Although the very young nation had a chronic shortage of weapons to go to war, it was determined to defend itself. Although there was much sympathy in Europe and elsewhere, only five countries (Tanzania, Gabon, Ivory Coast, Zambia, and Haiti) officially recognised the new republic. The United Kingdom supplied heavy weapons and ammunition to the Nigerian side, officially to preserve the multi-ethnic country it had created but also to preserve the supply of Nigerian oil to the United Kingdom and to protect the investments of Shell-BP. The Biafra side received arms and ammunition from France, even though the French government denied sponsoring Biafra. An article in Paris Match of 20 November 1968 claimed that French arms were reaching Biafra through neighbouring countries such as Gabon. The heavy supply of weapons by the United Kingdom was the biggest factor in determining the outcome of the war.

Several peace accords were held, with the most notable one held at Aburi, Ghana (the Aburi Accord). There were different accounts of what took place in Aburi. Ojukwu accused the federal government of going back on their promises while the federal government accused Ojukwu of distortion and half-truths. Ojukwu gained agreement to a confederation for Nigeria, rather than a federation. He was warned by his advisers that Gowon did not understand the difference and would renege upon the agreement.

When this happened, Ojukwu regarded it as both a failure by Gowon to keep to the spirit of the Aburi agreement and a lack of integrity on the side of the Nigerian Military Government in the negotiations toward a united Nigeria. Gowon's advisers, to the contrary, felt that he had enacted as much as was politically feasible in fulfilment of the spirit of Aburi. The Eastern Region was very ill-equipped for war, outmanned and outgunned by the Nigerians, but had the advantages of fighting in their homeland, support of most Easterners, determination, and use of limited resources.

The United Kingdom, which still maintained the highest level of influence over Nigeria's highly valued oil industry through Shell-BP, and the Soviet Union supported the Nigerian government, especially by military supplies.

The Nigerian Army in 1967 was completely unready for war. The Nigerian Army had no training or experience of war on the operational level, still being primarily an internal security force. Most Nigerian officers were more concerned with their social lives than military training, spending a disproportionate amount of their time on partying, drinking, hunting and playing games. Social status in the Army was extremely important and officers devoted an excessive amount of time to ensure their uniforms were always immaculate while there was a competition to own the most expensive automobiles and homes. The killings and purges perpetuated during the two coups of 1966 had killed most of the Sandhurst graduates. By July 1966, all of the officers holding the rank above colonel had been either killed or discharged while only 5 officers holding the rank of lieutenant colonel were still alive and on duty. Almost all of the junior officers had received their commissions after 1960 and most were heavily dependent on the more experienced NCOs to provide the necessary leadership. The same problems that afflicted the Federal Army also affected the Biafran Army even more whose officer corps was based around former Federal Igbo officers. The shortage of experienced officers was a major problem for the Biafran Army, made worse by a climate of paranoia and suspicion within Biafra as Ojukwu believed that other former Federal officers were plotting against him.

== War ==
Shortly after extending its blockade to include oil, the Nigerian government launched a "police action" to retake the secessionist territory. The war began in the early hours of 6 July 1967 when Nigerian Federal troops advanced in two columns into Biafra. The Biafra strategy had succeeded: the federal government had started the war, and the East was defending itself. The Nigerian Army offensive was through the north of Biafra led by Colonel Mohammed Shuwa and the local military units were formed as the 1st Infantry Division. The division was led mostly by northern officers. After facing unexpectedly fierce resistance and high casualties, the western Nigerian column advanced on the town of Nsukka, which fell on 14 July, while the eastern column made for Garkem, which was captured on 12 July.

=== Biafran offensive ===
The Biafrans responded with an offensive of their own. On 9 August, Biafran forces crossed their western border and the Niger river into the Mid‑Western state of Nigeria. Passing through the state capital of Benin City, the Biafrans advanced west until 21 August, when they were stopped at Ore in present-day Ondo State, 210 kilometres (130 mi) east of the Nigerian capital of Lagos. The Biafran attack was led by Lt. Col. Banjo, Yoruba man, with the Biafran rank of brigadier. The attack met little resistance and the Mid‑Western state was easily taken over. This was due to the pre-secession arrangement that all soldiers should return to their regions to stop the spate of killings, in which Igbo soldiers had been major victims. The Nigerian soldiers who were supposed to defend the Mid‑Western state were mostly Igbo from that state and, while some were in touch with their Biafran counterparts, others resisted the invasion. General Gowon responded by asking Colonel Murtala Mohammed (who later became head of state in 1975) to form another division (the 2nd Infantry Division) to expel the Biafrans from the Mid‑Western state, to defend the border of the Western state and to attack Biafra. At the same time, Gowon declared "total war" and announced the Federal government would mobilise the entire population of Nigeria for the war effort. From the summer of 1967 to the spring of 1969, the Federal Army grew from a force of 7,000 to a force of 200,000 men organised in three divisions. Biafra began the war with only 230 soldiers at Enugu, which grew to two battalions by August 1967, which soon were expanded into two brigades, the 51st and 52nd which became the core of the Biafran Army. By 1969, the Biafrans were to field 90,000 soldiers formed into five undermanned divisions together with a number of independent units.

As Nigerian forces retook the Mid‑Western state, the Biafran military administrator declared it to be the Republic of Benin on 19 September, though it ceased to exist the next day. The present country of Benin, west of Nigeria, was still named Dahomey at that time.

Although Benin City was retaken by the Nigerians on 22 September, the Biafrans succeeded in their primary objective by tying down as many Nigerian Federal troops as they could. Gen. Gowon also launched an offensive into Biafra south from the Niger Delta to the riverine area, using the bulk of the Lagos Garrison command under Colonel Benjamin Adekunle (called the Black Scorpion) to form the 3rd Infantry Division (which was later renamed as the 3rd Marine Commando). As the war continued, the Nigerian Army recruited amongst a wider area, including the Yoruba, Itshekiri, Urhobo, Edo, Ijaw, etc.

=== Nigerian offensive ===
The command was divided into two brigades with three battalions each. The 1st Brigade advanced on the axis of the Ogugu–Ogunga–Nsukka road while the 2nd Brigade advanced on the axis of the Gakem–Obudu–Ogoja road. By 10 July 1967, the 1st Brigade had conquered all its assigned territories. By 12 July, the 2nd brigade had captured Gakem, Ogudu, and Ogoja. To assist Nigeria, Egypt sent six Ilyushin Il-28 bombers flown by Egyptian air crews. The bombing of Red Cross hospitals together with schools, hospitals, and marketplaces helped earn Biafra international sympathy.

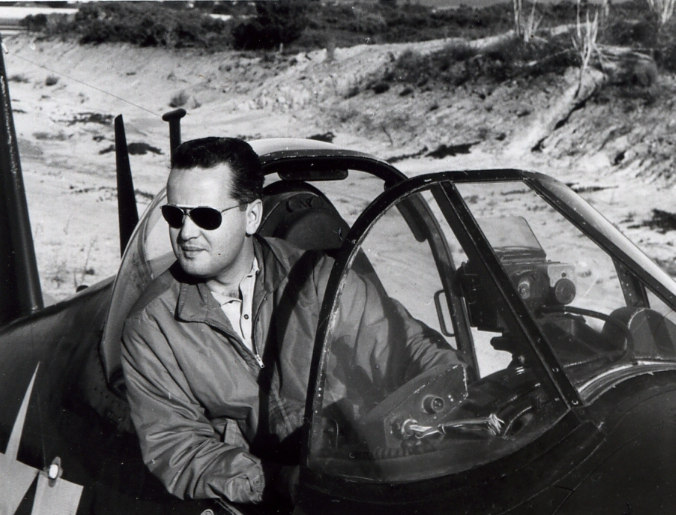
Lynn Garrison in cockpit of his F4U-7 Corsair 1966

Enugu became the hub of secession and rebellion, and the Nigerian government believed that once Enugu was captured, the drive for secession would end. The plans to conquer Enugu began on 12 September 1967. On 4 October, the Nigerian 1st Division captured Enugu. Ojukwu was asleep in the Biafran State House when the federal troops attacked and narrowly escaped by disguising himself as a servant. Many Nigerians hoped that Enugu's capture would convince the Igbos' traditional elite to end their support for secession, even if Ojukwu did not follow them. This did not occur. Ojukwu relocated his government without difficulty to Umuahia, a city positioned deep within traditional Igbo territory. The fall of Enugu contributed to a brief destabilisation of Biafran propaganda efforts, as the forced relocation of personnel left the Ministry of Information disorganised and the federal force's success undermined previous Biafran assertions that the Nigerian state could not withstand a protracted war. On 23 October the Biafran official radio declared in a broadcast that Ojukwu promised to continue resisting the federal government, and that he attributed the loss of Enugu to subversive actions.

Nigerian soldiers under Murtala Mohammed carried out a mass killing of 700 civilians when they captured Asaba on the River Niger. The Nigerians were repulsed three times as they attempted to cross the River Niger during October, resulting in the loss of thousands of troops, dozens of tanks and equipment. The first attempt by the 2nd Infantry Division on 12 October to cross the Niger from the town of Asaba to the Biafran city of Onitsha cost the Nigerian Federal Army over 5,000 soldiers killed, wounded, captured or missing. Operation Tiger Claw (17–20 October 1967) was a military conflict between Nigerian and Biafran military forces. On 17 October 1967 Nigerians invaded Calabar led by the "Black Scorpion", Benjamin Adekunle, while the Biafrans were led by Col. Ogbu Ogi, who was responsible for controlling the area between Calabar and Opobo, and Lynn Garrison, a foreign mercenary. The Biafrans came under immediate fire from the water and the air. For the next two days Biafran stations and military supplies were bombarded by the Nigerian air force. That same day Lynn Garrison reached Calabar but came under immediate fire by federal troops. By 20 October, Garrison's forces withdrew from the battle while Col. Ogi officially surrendered to Gen. Adekunle. On 19 May 1968 Port Harcourt was captured. With the capture of Enugu, Bonny, Calabar and Port Harcourt, the outside world was left in no doubt of the Federal supremacy in the war. Biafran propaganda always blamed military defeats on "saboteurs" within the ranks of the Biafran officer, and both officers and the other ranks were encouraged to denounce suspected "saboteurs". Throughout the war, Biafran officers were far more likely to be executed by their own side than by the Federal Army as Ojukwu conducted purges and had officers who were merely accused of being "saboteurs" taken out and shot. Ojukwu did not trust the majority of the former Federal Igbo officers who had rallied to Biafra and saw them as potential rivals, thus leading to murderous purges that led to most of them being executed. Furthermore, Ojukwu needed scapegoats for Biafra's defeats and death was the usual punishment for Biafran officers who lost a battle. Out of a fear of a coup, Ojukwu created several units such as the S Brigade commanded by himself and the 4th Commando Brigade commanded by the German mercenary Rolf Steiner that existed outside of the regular chain of command. Barua wrote that Ojukwu's leadership, especially his frequent executions of his own officers had a "disastrous impact" on the morale of the Biafran officer corps. The executions of officers also made it difficult for the Biafran officers to acquire the necessary experience to conduct military operations successfully as Barua noted the Biafran Army lacked both the "continuity and cohesion" to learn from the war.

=== Control over oil production ===
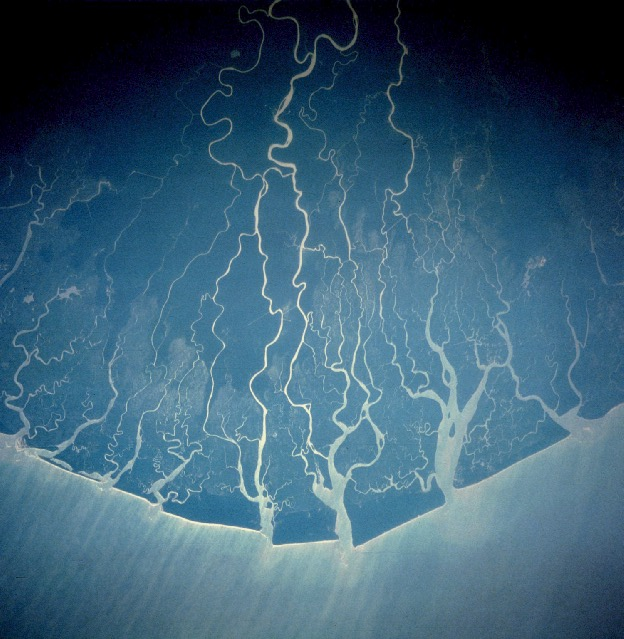
Control over petroleum in the Niger Delta was a paramount military objective during the war.

Oil exploration in Nigeria was pioneered by the Shell-BP Petroleum Development Company in 1937. In a bid to control the oil in the eastern region, the Federal government placed a shipping embargo on the territory. This embargo did not include oil tankers. The leadership of Biafra wrote to Shell-BP demanding royalties for the oil that was being explored in their region. After much deliberation, Shell-BP decided to pay Biafra the sum of 250,000 pounds. The news of this payment reached the Federal government, which immediately extended the shipping embargo to oil tankers. The Nigerian government also made it clear to Shell-BP that it expected the company to pay all outstanding oil royalties immediately. With the stalling on the payment for Biafra, the government instructed Shell-BP to stop operations in Biafra and took over from the company.

Towards the end of July 1967, Nigerian federal troops and marines captured Bonny Island in the Niger Delta, thereby taking control of vital Shell-BP facilities. Operations began again in May 1968, when Nigeria captured Port Harcourt. Its facilities had been damaged and needed repair. Oil production and export continued, but at a lower level. The completion in 1969 of a new terminal at Forçados brought production up from 142,000 barrels/day in 1958 to 540,000 barrels/day in 1969. In 1970, this figure doubled to 1.08 million barrels/day. The royalties enabled Nigeria to buy more weapons, hire mercenaries, etc. Biafra proved unable to compete on this economic level.

== International involvement ==
=== United Kingdom ===
The United Kingdom had planned to maintain and expand its supply of cheap high-quality oil from Nigeria. Therefore, it placed a high priority on maintenance of oil extraction and refining operations. The war broke out just a week before the Six-Day War in the Middle East, forcing oil tankers from the Middle East to use the long route around the Cape of Good Hope, thereby increasing the cost of Middle Eastern oil. In turn, this increased the importance of Nigerian oil to the United Kingdom, because Nigerian oil was cheaper than Persian Gulf oil. Initially, when it was unclear which side would prevail, the United Kingdom took a "wait and see" approach before opting decisively for Nigeria. Nigeria had a navy of only six vessels, the largest of which was a frigate; an air force of 76 planes, none of which were fighters or bombers; and an army of 7,000 men with no tanks and a shortage of officers with command experience. Though Biafra was likewise similarly weak, the two sides appeared evenly matched at the beginning of the war, and Nigerian victory was by no means considered preordained.

The United Kingdom backed the Federal Government but, when the war broke out, cautioned them not to damage British oil installations in the East. These oilworks, under the control of the Shell-BP Petroleum Development Company (jointly owned by Shell and BP), controlled 84 per cent of Nigeria's 580,000 barrels per day. Two-thirds of this oil came from the Eastern region, and another third from the newly created Mid-West region. Two-fifths of all Nigerian oil ended up in the United Kingdom. In 1967, 30 per cent of the oil being imported into the United Kingdom came from Nigeria.

Shell-BP therefore considered carefully a request by the Federal Government that it refuse to pay the royalties demanded by Biafra. Its lawyers advised that payment to Biafra would be appropriate if this government did in fact maintain law and order in the region in question. The British government advised that paying Biafra could undermine the goodwill of the Federal Government. Shell-BP made the payment, and the government established a blockade on oil exports. Forced to choose a side, Shell-BP and the British government threw in their lot with the Federal Government in Lagos, apparently calculating that this side would be more likely to win the war. As the British High Commissioner in Lagos wrote to the Secretary of State for Commonwealth Affairs on 27 July 1967:

Ojukwu, even victorious, will not be in a strong position. He will require all the international help and recognition he can get. The Federal Government would be much better placed both internationally and internally. They would have a cast iron case for the severest treatment of a company which has subsidised a rebel, and I feel fairly convinced they would press their case to the lengths of cancelling the Company's concessions and nationalising their installations. I conclude, therefore, if the company does change its mind and asks the British Government for advice, the best that could be given is for it to clamber hastily back on the Lagos side of the fence with cheque book at the ready."

Shell-BP took this advice. It continued to quietly support Nigeria through the rest of the war, in one case advancing a royalty of £5.5 million to fund the purchase of more British weapons.

It was not until Federal forces captured the ocean oil terminal at Bonny on 25 July 1967 that the British Prime Minister Harold Wilson decided to back Nigeria with military aid. After the Federal victory at Bonny, Wilson summoned David Hunt, the British high commissioner to Nigeria, for a meeting at 10 Downing Street in early August 1967 for his assessment of the situation. Hunt's view that the Federal forces were the better organised and would win because they could draw upon a greater population led Wilson to side with Nigeria.

During the war, the British government covertly supplied Nigeria with weapons and military intelligence and may have also helped it to hire mercenaries. After the decision was made to back Nigeria, the BBC oriented its reporting to favour this side. Supplies provided to the Federal Military Government included two vessels and 60 vehicles. In the United Kingdom, the humanitarian campaign around Biafra began on 12 June 1968, with media coverage on ITV and in The Sun. The charities Oxfam and Save the Children Fund were soon deployed, with large sums of money at their disposal.

=== France ===
France provided weapons, mercenary fighters, and other assistance to Biafra and promoted its cause internationally, describing the situation as a genocide. President Charles de Gaulle referred to "Biafra's just and noble cause". However, France did not recognise Biafra diplomatically. Through Pierre Laureys, France had apparently provided two B-26s, Alouette helicopters, and pilots. France supplied Biafra with captured German and Italian weapons from World War II, sans serial numbers, delivered as part of regular shipments to Ivory Coast. France also sold Panhard armoured vehicles to the Nigerian federal government.

French involvement in the war can be viewed in the context of its geopolitical strategy (Françafrique) and competition with the British in West Africa. Nigeria represented a base of British influence in the predominantly French-aligned area. France and Portugal used nearby countries in their sphere of influence, especially Ivory Coast under President Félix Houphouët-Boigny, as waystations for shipments to Biafra. To some extent, also, France repeated its earlier policy from the Congo Crisis, when it supported the secession of the southern mining province Katanga.

Economically, France gained incentives through oil drilling contracts for the Société Anonyme Française de Recherches et d'Exploitation de Pétrolières (SAFRAP), apparently arranged with Eastern Nigeria in advance of its secession from the Nigerian Federation. SAFRAP laid claim to 7% of the Nigerian petroleum supply. French intelligence officer Jean Mauricheau-Beaupré, a deputy to the then lead coordinator of France's Africa policy Jacques Foccart, declared the following to those who were concerned with French support to Biafra: "[French] support was actually given to a handful of Biafran bourgeoisie in return for the oil. ... The real Ibo mentality is much farther to the left than that of Ojukwu and even if we had won, there would have been the problem of keeping him in power in the face of leftist infiltration." Biafra, for its part, openly appreciated its relationship with France.

France led the way, internationally, for political support of Biafra. Portugal also sent weapons. These transactions were arranged through the "Biafran Historical Research Centre" in Paris. French-aligned Gabon and Ivory Coast recognised Biafra in May 1968. On 8 May 1968, De Gaulle personally contributed 30,000 francs to medicine purchases for the French Red Cross mission. Fairly widespread student-worker unrest diverted the government's attention only temporarily. The government declared an arms embargo but maintained arms shipments to Biafra under cover of humanitarian aid. In July the government redoubled its efforts to involve the public in a humanitarian approach to the conflict. Images of starving children and accusations of genocide filled French newspapers and television programs. Amidst this press blitz, on 31 July 1968, De Gaulle made an official statement in support of Biafra. Maurice Robert, head of Service de Documentation Extérieure et de Contre-Espionnage (SDECE, the French foreign intelligence service) African operations, wrote in 2004 that his agency supplied the press with details about the war and told them to use the word "genocide" in their reporting.

France declared "Biafra Week" on 11–17 March 1969, centred on a 2-franc raffle held by the French Red Cross. Soon after, de Gaulle terminated arms shipments, then resigned on 27 April 1969. Interim president Alain Poher fired Foccart. Georges Pompidou re-hired Foccart and resumed support for Biafra, including cooperation with the South African secret service to import more weapons.

=== Soviet Union ===
The Soviet Union strongly backed the Nigerian government, emphasising the similarity with the Congo situation. Nigeria's need for more aircraft, which the United Kingdom and the United States refused to sell, led Gowon to accept a Soviet offer in the summer of 1967 to sell a squadron of 17 MiG-17 fighters. The British-trained Nigerian military tended to be distrustful of the Soviet Union, but the Soviet ambassador in Lagos, Alexander Romanov, a gregarious and friendly man as well as a shrewd diplomat, established an excellent rapport with Gowon and persuaded him that accepting Soviet weapons would not mean subjection to the Soviet Union. The first MiG-17s arrived in Nigeria in August 1967 together with some about 200 Soviet technicians to train the Nigerians in their use. Though the MiG-17s turned out to be too sophisticated for the Nigerians to use properly, requiring Egyptian Air Force pilots to fly them, the Soviet-Nigerian arms deal turned out to be one of the turning points of the war. Besides establishing an arms pipeline from the Soviet Union to Nigeria, the possibility that the Soviet Union would gain greater influence in Nigeria led the United Kingdom to increase its supply of arms to maintain its influence in Lagos while ruling out the possibility of either the United States or Britain recognising Biafra.

The Soviet Union consistently supplied Nigeria with weapons, with the diplomatic disclaimer that these were "strictly for cash on a commercial basis". In 1968, the USSR agreed to finance the Kainji Dam on the Niger (somewhat upriver from the Delta). Soviet media outlets initially accused the British of cynically supporting the Biafran secession, then had to adjust these claims later when it turned out that the United Kingdom was, in fact, supporting the Federal Government.

One explanation for Soviet sympathy with the Federal Military Government was a shared opposition to internal secessionist movements. Before the war, the Soviets had seemed sympathetic to the Igbos. But Soviet Prime Minister Alexei Kosygin stated to their chagrin in October 1967 that "the Soviet people fully understand" Nigeria's motives and its need "to prevent the country from being dismembered."

Reportedly, the war substantially improved Soviet-Nigerian diplomatic and trade relations, and Moskvitch cars began to make appearances around Lagos. The USSR became a competitive importer of Nigerian cacao.

=== China ===
In its first major statement on the war in September 1968, the Xinhua Press Agency stated the People's Republic of China fully supported the justified struggle for liberation of the people of Biafra against the Nigerian government supported by "Anglo-American imperialism and Soviet revisionism". China supported arms to Biafra via Tanzania, supplying arms worth some $2 million in 1968–1969. The Soviet Union was one of Nigeria's leading supporters, supplying arms on a generous scale. China’s recent rivalry with the Soviets in the Sino-Soviet split, may have influenced its support for Biafra.

=== Israel ===
From early on, Israel perceived that Nigeria would be an important player in West African politics and saw good relations with Lagos as an important foreign policy objective. Nigeria and Israel established a linkage in 1957. In 1960, the United Kingdom allowed the creation of an Israeli diplomatic mission in Lagos, and Israel made a $10 million loan to the Nigerian government. Israel also developed a cultural relation with the Igbos based on possible shared traditions. These moves represented a significant diplomatic success given the Muslim orientation of the northern-dominated government. Some northern leaders disapproved of contact with Israel and banned Israelis from Maiduguri and Sokoto.

Israel did not begin arms sales to Nigeria until after Aguyi-Ironsi came to power on 17 January 1966. This was considered an opportune time to develop this relationship with the federal government. Ram Nirgad became Israeli ambassador to Nigeria in January. Thirty tons of mortar rounds were delivered in April.

The Eastern Region began seeking assistance from Israel in September 1966. Israel apparently turned down their requests repeatedly, although they may have put the Biafran representatives in contact with another arms dealer. In 1968, Israel began supplying the Federal Military Government with arms—about $500,000 worth, according to the US State Department. Meanwhile, as elsewhere, the situation in Biafra became publicised as a genocide. The Knesset publicly debated this issue on 17 and 22 July 1968, winning applause from the press for its sensitivity. Right-wing and left-wing political groups, and student activists, spoke for Biafra. In August 1968, the Israeli Air Force overtly sent twelve tons of food aid to a nearby site outside of Nigerian (Biafran) airspace. Covertly, Mossad provided Biafra with $100,000 (through Zurich) and attempted an arms shipment. Soon after, Israel arranged to make clandestine weapons shipments to Biafra using Ivory Coast transport planes. The nations of sub-Saharan Africa tended to support the Arabs in the Israeli-Palestinian dispute by voting for resolutions sponsored by Arab states at the United Nations. A major goal of Israeli diplomacy was to wean the African states away from the Arab states and given the way that the majority of African nations supported Nigeria, Israel was loath to antagonise them by supporting Biafra too overtly.

=== Egypt ===
President Gamal Abdel Nasser dispatched pilots of the Egyptian Air Force to fight for Nigeria in August 1967, flying the recently arrived MiG-17s. The tendency of Egyptian pilots to indiscriminately bomb Biafran civilians proved counterproductive in the propaganda war as the Biafrans did their best to publicise cases of civilians killed by the Egyptians. In the spring of 1969, the Nigerians replaced the Egyptian pilots with European pilots who proved to be considerably more competent.

=== United States ===
The civil war began while the United States was under the presidency of Lyndon B. Johnson, who was officially neutral in regard to the civil war, with U.S. Secretary of State Dean Rusk stating that "America is not in a position to take action as Nigeria is an area under British influence". Strategically, U.S. interests aligned with the Federal Military Government, although there was considerable popular public sentiment in support of Biafra. The U.S. also saw value in its alliance with Lagos, and sought to protect $800 million (in the assessment of the State Department) worth of private investment.

The neutrality was not universally popular, and a pro-Biafra lobby emerged within the United States to pressure the U.S. government to take a more active role in assisting Biafra. The American Committee to Keep Biafra Alive was an organization founded by American activists to inform the American public of the war and sway popular opinion towards Biafra. Biafra became a topic in the 1968 United States presidential election and on 9 September 1968, future Republican president Richard Nixon called for Lyndon B. Johnson to take action in helping Biafra, stating:

Until now, efforts to relieve the Biafran people have been thwarted by the desire of central government of Nigeria to pursue total and unconditional victory and by the fear of the Ibo people that surrender means wholesale atrocities and genocide. But genocide is what is taking place right now—and starvation is the grim reaper.

Both Biafran officials and the U.S. pro-Biafra lobby hoped the election of Richard Nixon would change U.S. foreign policy regarding the war. However, when Nixon became president in 1969, he found there was little he could do to change the established stance aside from calling for another round of peace talks. According to American political theorist Ernest W. Lefever, the U.S. providing official support to Biafra would have resulted in hostility from not only Nigeria, but also other African nations who supported Nigeria in the war, who had successfully argued to the United Nations that the war was an internal affair that the U.N. should not be involved with. The Vietnam War served as another obstacle to a possible U.S. intervention in Biafra. Despite this, Nixon continued to personally support Biafra.

Himself a Jew who escaped persecution from Nazi Germany, U.S. Secretary of State Henry Kissinger compared the Igbo people to Jews in a memoriam written to U.S. President Richard Nixon, stating:

The Ibos are the wandering Jews of West Africa – gifted, aggressive, Westernized; at best envied and resented, but mostly despised by the mass of their neighbors in the Federation.

Despite this, Kissinger still elected to support Nigeria politically. Gulf Oil Nigeria, the third major player in Nigerian oil, was producing 9% of the oil coming out of Nigeria before the war began. Its operations were all located offshore of the federally controlled Mid-Western territory; therefore it continued to pay royalties to the federal government and its operations were mostly undisrupted.

=== Canada ===
At the request of the Nigerian government, Canada sent three observers to investigate allegations of genocide and war crimes against the Nigerian military. Major General W.A. Milroy was joined by two other Canadian officers in 1968, and the Canadian contingent remained until February 1970.

=== Rest of Africa ===
Biafra appealed unsuccessfully for support from the Organisation of African Unity (OAU), the precursor to the African Union. The OAU, bound by its charter to oppose any secession from a member state, denounced Biafra's attempt to secede from Nigeria. Equally bound by its charter to refrain from interference in the internal affairs of its member states, the OAU took no further action. Countries such as Ethiopia and Egypt vocally supported the Nigerian government's policies in order to prevent inspiring revolts within their own borders. However, Biafra received the support of African countries such as Tanzania, Zambia, Gabon and Ivory Coast. Rhodesian pilots smuggled weapons and money into Biafra, which Rhodesian intelligence chief Ken Flower claimed was part of the operations of Rhodesia's Central Intelligence Organisation.

=== Foreign mercenaries ===
Outmatched by Nigeria's superior firepower, Biafra hired foreign mercenaries for extra support. Mercenaries with prior experience fighting in the Congo Crisis were eagerly drawn to Biafra. German mercenary Rolf Steiner was placed in charge of the 4th Commando Brigade of the Biafran Armed Forces and commanded 3,000 men. Welsh mercenary Taffy Williams, one of Steiner's subordinates, was in command of one hundred Biafran fighters. Steiner's other subordinates were a mixture of adventurers consisting of the Italian Giorgio Norbiato; the Rhodesian explosive expert Johnny Erasmus; the Scotsman Alexander "Alec" Gay; the Irishman Louis "Paddy" Malrooney; the Corsican Armand Iaranelli who had been able to enlist in the Foreign Legion by pretending to be Italian; and a Jamaican bartender turned mercenary who called himself "Johnny Korea". Polish-Swiss pilot Jan Zumbach formed and commanded a ragtag air force for Biafra. Canadian pilot Lynn Garrison, Swedish pilot Carl Gustaf von Rosen, and Rhodesian pilot Jack Malloch served as leaders of Biafran air operations, attacking Nigerian forces and also supplying weapons and food aid. Portuguese pilots also served in the Biafran Air Force, transporting weapons from Portugal to Biafra. Steiner established a brown water navy by converting some Chris-Craft Boats into gun boats, which turned out to be successful in launching surprise raids for weapons and supplies.

It was hoped that employing mercenaries in Nigeria would have impact similar to that experienced in the Congo, but the mercenaries proved largely ineffective since the Nigerian military received much more professional and adequate training compared to the Congolese militias. Despite some initial successes (such as Operation OAU), over half of the 4th Commando Brigade was wiped out by Nigerian forces during the disastrous Operation Hiroshima of 15–29 November 1968, resulting in Steiner experiencing depression and a nervous breakdown, leading to his eventual expulsion and replacement by Taffy Williams. Although Nigeria appeared to be a tougher opponent, commentators observing the war noted that the remaining mercenaries appeared to have developed a personal or ideological commitment to Biafra's cause, which is a rare trait for mercenaries. Belgian mercenary Marc Goosens, who was killed by defensive Nigerian forces in a suicide mission during Operation Hiroshima, was reportedly motivated to return to Africa after a dispute with his girlfriend. Goosens was photographed in the moments before and after his death. Steiner claimed to have fought for Biafra for idealistic reasons, saying the Igbo people were the victims of genocide, but the American journalist Ted Morgan mocked his claims, describing Steiner as a militarist who simply craved war because killing was the only thing he knew how to do well. Journalist Frederick Forsyth quotes Taffy Williams speaking highly of his Biafran subordinates, "I've seen a lot of Africans at war. But there's nobody to touch these people. Give me 10,000 Biafrans for six months, and we'll build an army that would be invincible on this continent. I've seen men die in this war who would have won the Victoria Cross in another context".

After the war, Philip Effiong, the chief of the Biafran general staff was asked by a journalist about the impact of the mercenaries on the war, his reply was: "They had not helped. It would have made no difference if not a single one of them came to work for the secessionist forces. Rolf Steiner stayed the longest. He was more of a bad influence than anything else. We were happy to get rid of him."

== Biafra surrounded ==
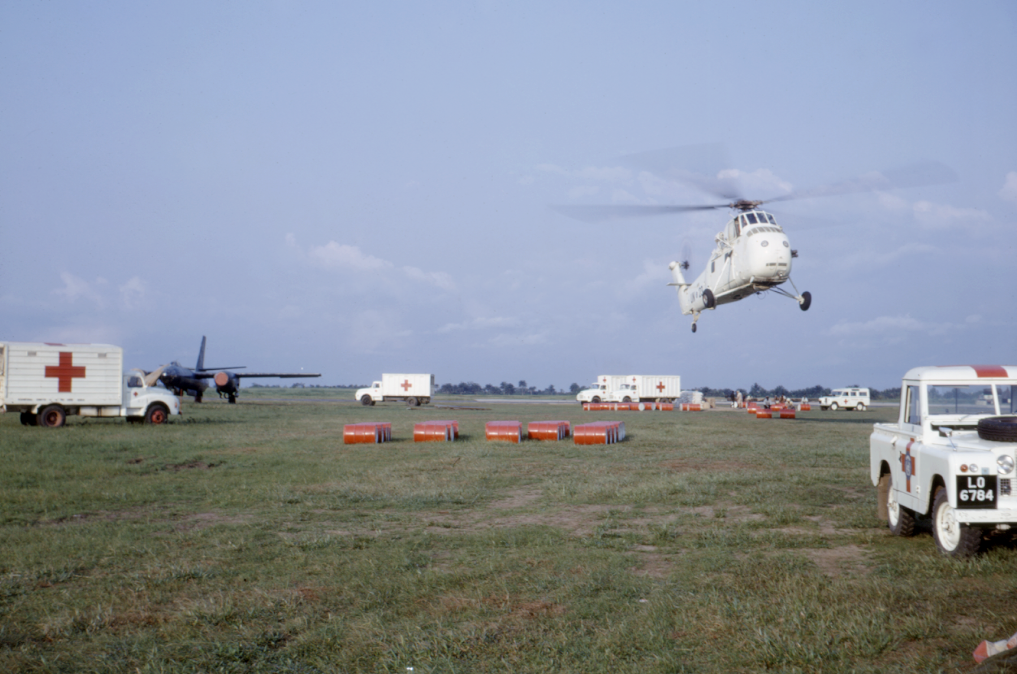
A makeshift airport in Calabar, Nigeria, where relief efforts to aid famine victims were deployed by helicopter teams

From 1968 onward, the war fell into a form of stalemate, with Nigerian forces unable to make significant advances into the remaining areas under Biafran control due to stiff resistance and major defeats in Abagana, Arochukwu, Oguta, Umuahia (Operation OAU), Onne, Ikot Ekpene, etc. But another Nigerian offensive from April to June 1968 began to close the ring around the Biafrans with further advances on the two northern fronts and the capture of Port Harcourt on 19 May 1968. The blockade of the surrounded Biafrans led to a humanitarian disaster when it emerged that there was widespread civilian hunger and starvation in the besieged Igbo areas.

The Biafran government reported that Nigeria was using hunger and genocide to win the war, and sought aid from the outside world. Private groups in the US, led by Senator Ted Kennedy, responded. No one was ever held responsible for these killings.

In September 1968, the federal army planned what Gowon described as the "final offensive". Initially the final offensive was neutralised by Biafran troops by the end of the year after several Nigerian troops were routed in Biafran ambushes. In the latter stages, a Southern Federal Military Government offensive managed to break through. However, in 1969, the Biafrans launched several offensives against the Nigerians in their attempts to keep the Nigerians off-balance starting in March when the 14th Division of the Biafran army recaptured Owerri and moved towards Port Harcourt, but were halted just north of the city. In May 1969, Biafran commandos recaptured oil wells in Kwale. In July 1969, Biafran forces launched a major land offensive supported by foreign mercenary pilots continuing to fly in food, medical supplies and weapons. Most notable of the mercenaries was Swedish Count Carl Gustav von Rosen who led air attacks with five Malmö MFI-9 MiniCOIN small piston-engined aircraft, armed with rocket pods and machine guns. His Biafran Air Force consisted of three Swedes: von Rosen, Gunnar Haglund and Martin Lang. The other two pilots were Biafrans: Willy Murray-Bruce and Augustus Opke. From 22 May to 8 July 1969 von Rosen's small force attacked Nigerian military airfields in Port Harcourt, Enugu, Benin City and Ughelli, destroying or damaging a number of Nigerian Air Force jets used to attack relief flights, including a few MiG-17's and three of Nigeria's six Ilyushin Il-28 bombers that were used to bomb Biafran villages and farms on a daily basis. Although the Biafran offensives of 1969 were a tactical success, the Nigerians soon recovered. The Biafran air attacks did disrupt the combat operations of the Nigerian Air Force, but only for a few months.

Malmö MFI-9 Biafra Baby two-view silhouette

In response to the Nigerian government using foreigners to lead some advances, the Biafran government also began hiring foreign mercenaries to extend the war. Only German-born Rolf Steiner, a lieutenant colonel with the 4th Commandos, and Major Taffy Williams, a Welshman, would remain for the duration. Nigeria deployed foreign aircraft, in the form of Soviet MiG‑17 and Il‑28 bombers.

=== Humanitarian crisis ===
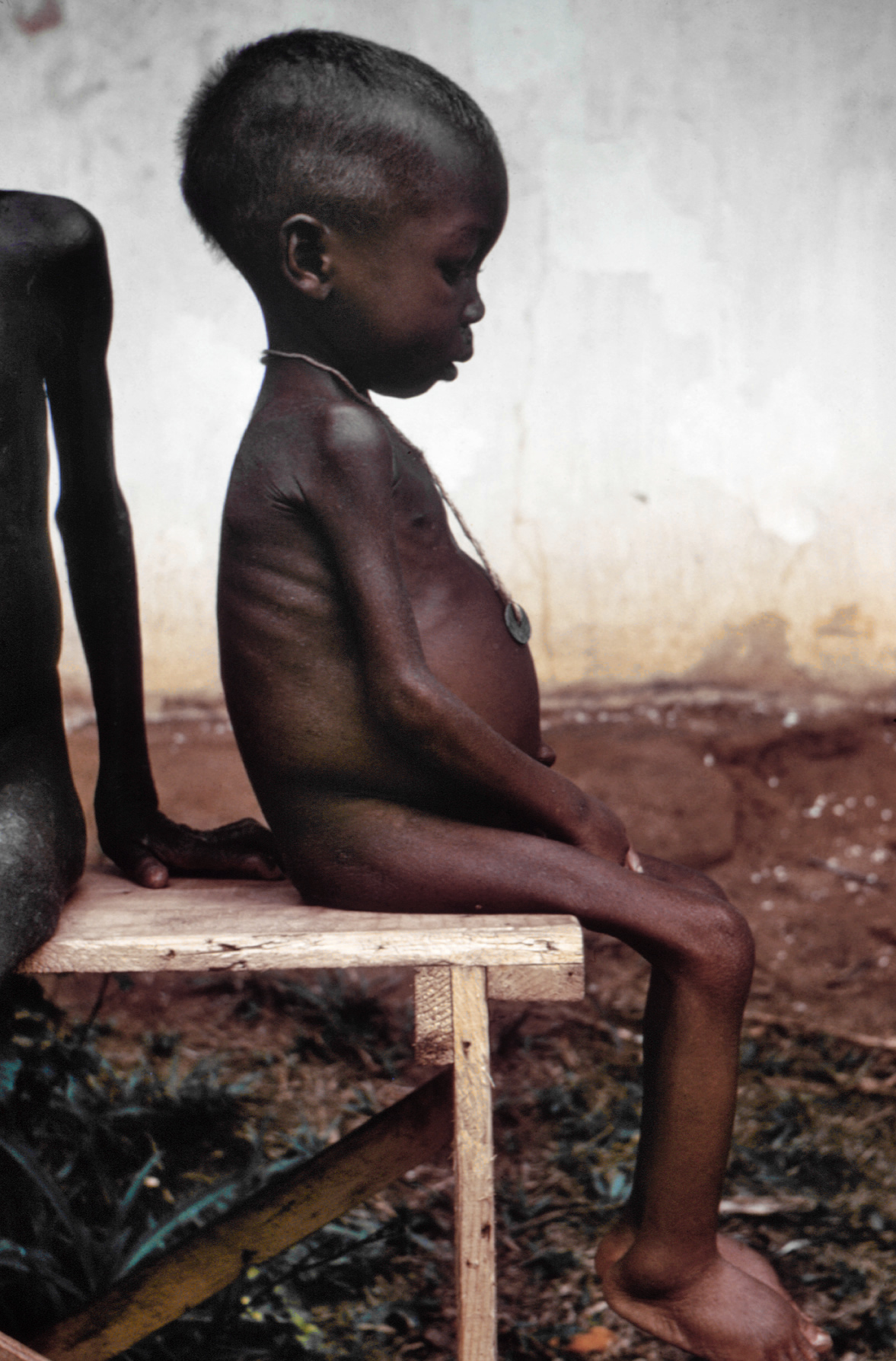
A child suffering the effects of kwashiorkor, a disease brought on due to a severe dietary protein deficiency. Pictures of the famine caused by the Nigerian blockade garnered worldwide sympathy for the Biafrans. It was regarded in the Western press as the genocide of two million people, half of them children.

The September massacres and subsequent Igbo withdrawal from northern Nigeria was the basis for the initial human rights petition to the UN to end genocide and provided a historical link to Biafran claims of genocide during the Nigerian civil war. Awareness of a mounting crisis rose in 1968. Information spread especially through religious networks, beginning with alerts from missionaries. It did not escape the notice of worldwide Christian organisations that the Biafrans were Christian and the northern Nigerians controlling the federal government were Muslim. Among these Christian efforts were the organisation Joint Church Aid and Caritas, the latter aligned with various international Catholic aid groups. The famine was a result of the blockade that the Nigerian government had imposed on the Eastern region in the months leading up to secession. Frederick Forsyth, then a journalist in Nigeria and later a successful novelist, observed that the main problem was kwashiorkor, a protein deficiency. Prior to the civil war, the main source of dietary protein was dried fish imported from Norway, which was supplemented by local hogs, chicken and eggs. The blockade prevented imports, and local protein supplies were quickly depleted: "The national diet was now almost 100% starch."

Many volunteer bodies organised the Biafran airlift which provided blockade-breaking relief flights into Biafra, carrying food, medicines, and sometimes (according to some claims) weapons. More common was the claim that the arms-carrying aircraft would closely shadow aid aircraft, making it more difficult to distinguish between aid aircraft and military supply aircraft.

The American Community to Keep Biafra Alive stood apart from other organisations by quickly creating a broad strategy for pressuring the American government into taking a more active role in facilitating relief. Former Peace Corps volunteers who had recently returned from Nigeria and college students founded the American Committee in July 1968. The Peace Corps volunteers stationed in the Eastern Region developed strong friendships and identified as Igbo which prompted them to help the Eastern Region.

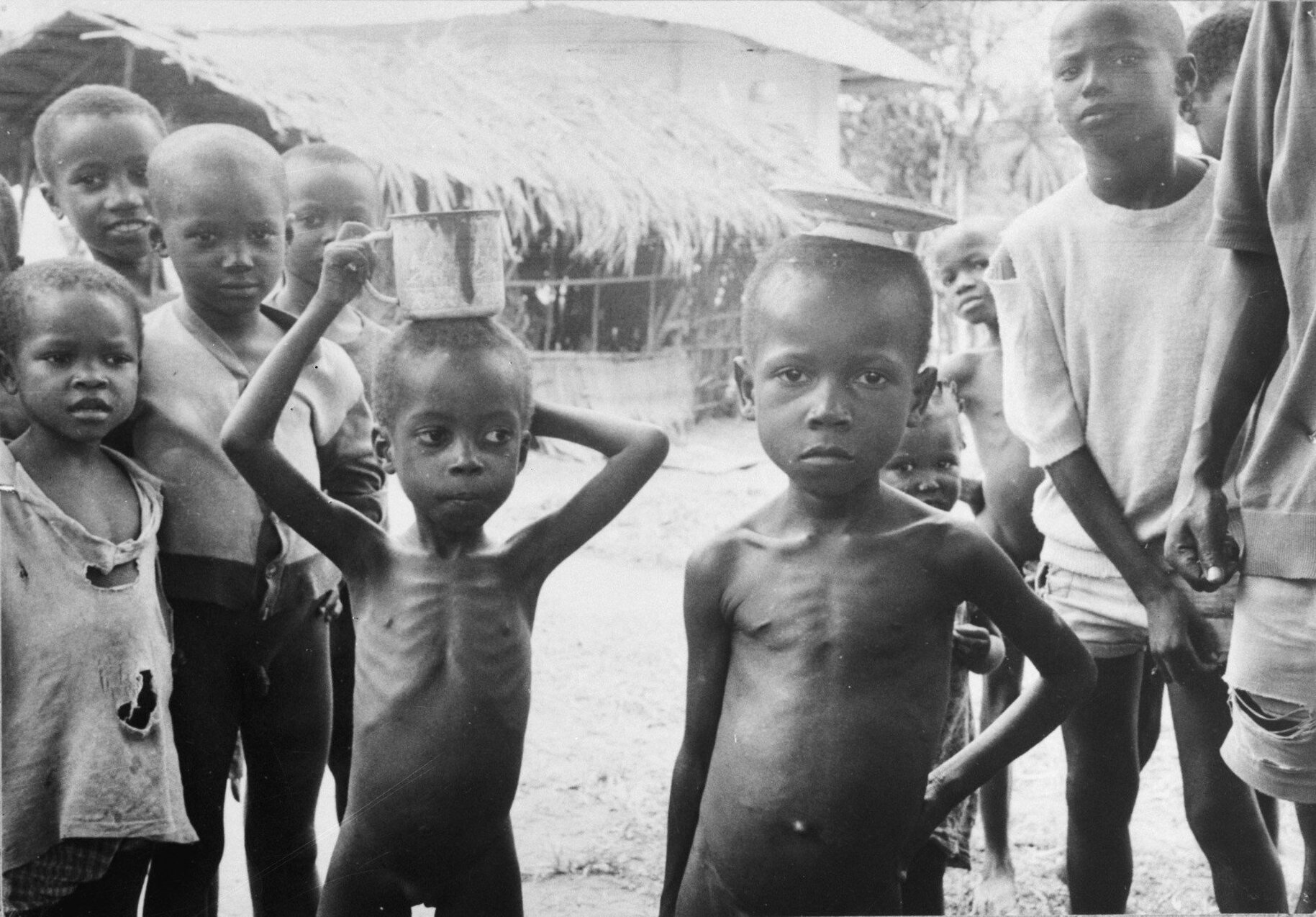
Malnourished children in Biafra in August 1968

One of the characters assisting Count Carl Gustav von Rosen was Lynn Garrison, an ex-RCAF fighter pilot. He introduced the Count to a Canadian method of dropping bagged supplies to remote areas in Canada without losing the contents. He showed how one sack of food could be placed inside a larger sack before the supply drop. When the package hit the ground the inner sack would rupture while the outer one kept the contents intact. With this method many tons of food were dropped to many Biafrans who would otherwise have died of starvation.

Bernard Kouchner was one of a number of French doctors who volunteered with the French Red Cross to work in hospitals and feeding centres in besieged Biafra. The Red Cross required volunteers to sign an agreement, which was seen by some (like Kouchner and his supporters) as being similar to a gag order, that was designed to maintain the organisation's neutrality, whatever the circumstances. Kouchner and the other French doctors signed this agreement.

After entering the country, the volunteers, in addition to Biafran health workers and hospitals, were subjected to attacks by the Nigerian army, and witnessed civilians being murdered and starved by the blockading forces. Kouchner also witnessed these events, particularly the huge number of starving children, and when he returned to France, he publicly criticised the Nigerian government and the Red Cross for their seemingly complicit behaviour. With the help of other French doctors, Kouchner put Biafra in the media spotlight and called for an international response to the situation. These doctors, led by Kouchner, concluded that a new aid organisation was needed that would ignore political / religious boundaries and prioritise the welfare of victims. They formed the Comité de Lutte contre le Génocide au Biafra, which in 1971 became Médecins Sans Frontières (Doctors Without Borders).

The crisis brought about a large increase in prominence and funding of non-governmental organisations (NGOs).

=== Media and public opinion ===
Media and public relations played a central role in the war, due to their influence on morale at home and the dynamics of international involvement. Both sides relied heavily on external support. Biafra hired the New York public relations firm of Ruder and Finn to lobby American public opinion. However, it was not until Biafra hired the Geneva public relations Markpress in January 1968 that significant international sympathy was won. Markpress was headed by an American public relations executive, William Bernhardt, who was paid 12,000 Swiss francs per month for his services, and who expected a share of Biafra's oil revenues after the war. Markpress's portrayal of the war as a struggle for freedom by the Catholic Igbos against the Muslim-dominated north won the support of Catholic opinion all over the world, especially in the United States. Besides portraying the war as a Christian-Muslim conflict, Markpress accused the Federal government of waging genocide against the Igbos, a campaign that was extremely effective as pictures of starving Igbos won the sympathy of the world.

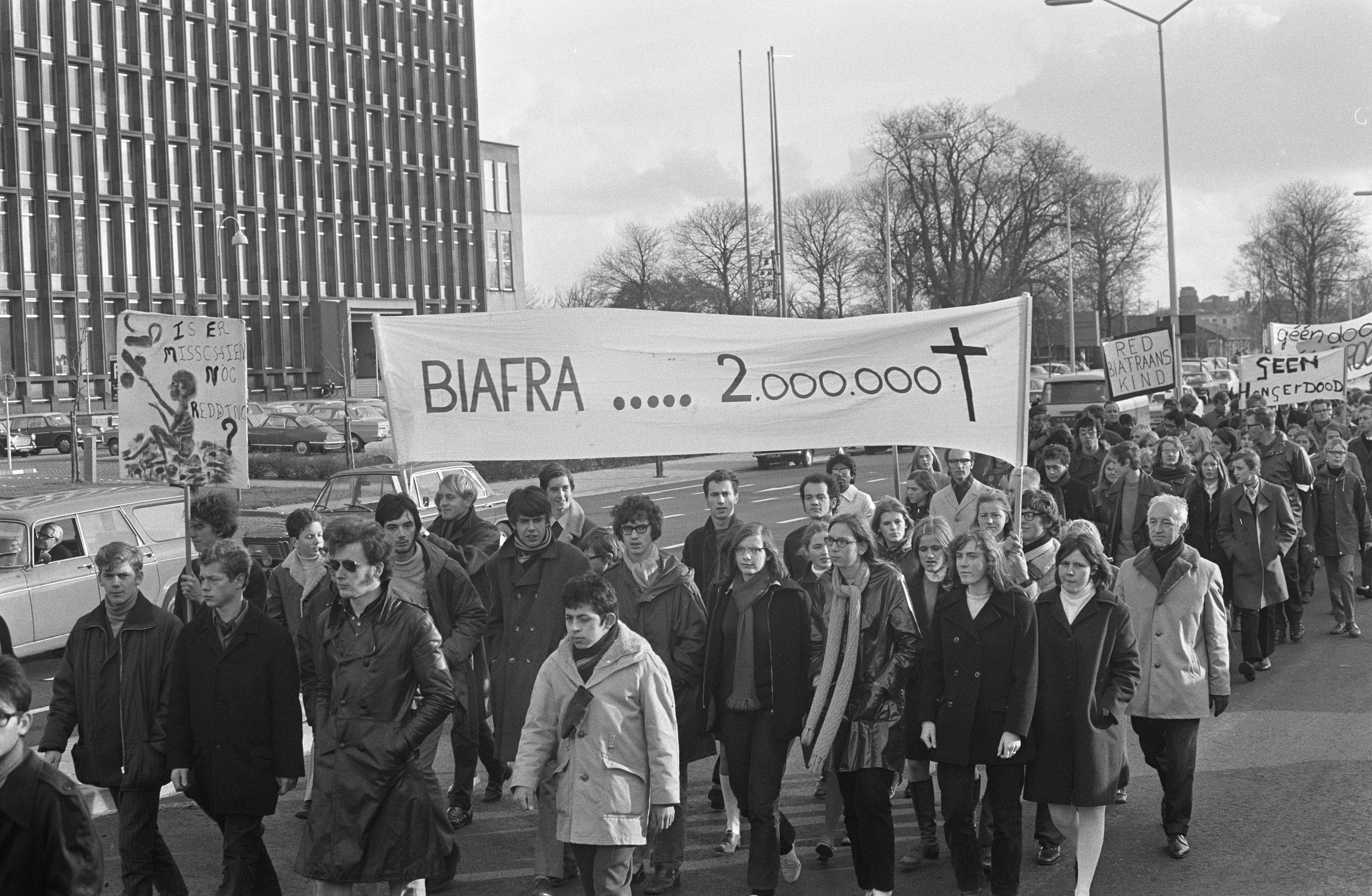
Student protesters in The Hague, 20 November 1969.

Media campaigns focused on the plight of the Biafrans intensified internationally in the summer of 1968. By the Biafran leadership and then around the world, the pogroms and famine were classified as genocide and compared to The Holocaust; hypothetical Judaic origins of the Igbos were used to bolster comparisons with Jews in Germany. In the international press, Igbo refugee camps were compared to Nazi extermination camps.

Humanitarian appeals differed somewhat from place to place. In the United Kingdom, humanitarian aid used familiar discourses of imperial responsibility; in Ireland, advertisements appealed to shared Catholicism and experiences of civil war. Both of these appeals channelled older cultural values into support for the new model of international NGOs. In Ireland, public opinion identified intensely with Biafra as most of the Catholic priests working in Biafra were Irish who naturally sympathised with the Biafrans, who they saw as fellow Catholics struggling for independence. The Irish journalist John Hogan who covered the war noted: "The threat of famine, combined with an independence struggle, had an almost irresistible political and emotional impact on Irish public opinion, which became hugely supportive of the regular airlifts, via the off-shore Portuguese island of São Tomé, of food and medical supplies to the beleaguered infant republic". The use of famine as a conscious tactic by the Federal government who wanted to starve Biafra into submission provoked parallels with the Great Famine of Ireland of the 1840s while many Irish people saw a parallel with Igbo struggle for independence with their own independence struggle. The pro-Biafra British journalist Frederick Forsyth started covering the war in the summer of 1967 for the BBC, became angry at the pro-Nigeria stance of the British government and resigned in protest in September 1967. Returning as a freelance journalist in 1968, Forysth worked closely with the Irish Holy Ghost Fathers to collect information about the famine, and whose dispatches from Biafra had an immense impact on British public opinion.

In Israel, the Holocaust comparison was promoted, as was the theme of threat from hostile Muslim neighbours.

The Biafran war presented Westerners with the notion of starving African children. The Biafran famine was one of the first African disasters to receive widespread media coverage, enabled by the proliferation of television sets. The televised disaster and the rising NGOs mutually enhanced each other; NGOs maintained their own communications networks and played a significant role in shaping news coverage.

Biafran elites studied Western propaganda techniques and released carefully constructed public communications in an intentional fashion. Biafran propagandists had the dual task of appealing to international public opinion, and maintaining morale and nationalist spirit domestically. Political cartoons were a preferred medium for publiciabsing simple interpretations of the war. Biafra also used push polling to insinuate messages out Nigeria's inherent bloodthirstiness. Novelist Chinua Achebe became a committed propagandist for Biafra, and one of its leading international advocates.

On 29 May 1969, Bruce Mayrock, a student at Columbia University, set himself ablaze at the premises of the United Nations Headquarters in New York, to protest what he viewed as a genocide against the people of Biafra. He died of his injuries the following day. On 25 November 1969, musician John Lennon returned the MBE he had been awarded by Queen Elizabeth II in 1964 in protest against British support for Nigeria. In his letter to the Queen returning the MBE, Lennon wrote: "Your Majesty, I am returning this in protest against Britain's involvement in the Nigeria-Biafra thing, against our support of America in Vietnam, and against Cold Turkey slipping down the charts. With love. John Lennon."

== Kwale oilfield incident ==
In May 1969, a company of Biafran commandos raided an oilfield in Kwale and killed 11 Saipem workers and Agip technicians. They captured three Europeans unhurt and then at a nearby Okpai Field Development Biafran commandos surrounded and captured 15 more expatriate personnel. The captives included 14 Italians, three West Germans and one Lebanese. It was claimed that the foreigners were captured fighting alongside Nigerians against Biafran troops and that they assisted Nigerians in constructing roads to aid them in their operations against Biafra. They were tried by a Biafran court and sentenced to death.

This incident caused an international uproar. In the month that followed Pope Paul VI, the governments of Italy, the United Kingdom and the United States of America mounted concerted pressure on Biafra. On 4 June 1969, after receiving a personal direct mail from the Pope, Ojukwu pardoned the foreigners. They were released to the special envoys sent by the governments of Ivory Coast and Gabon and left Biafra.

== End of the war ==
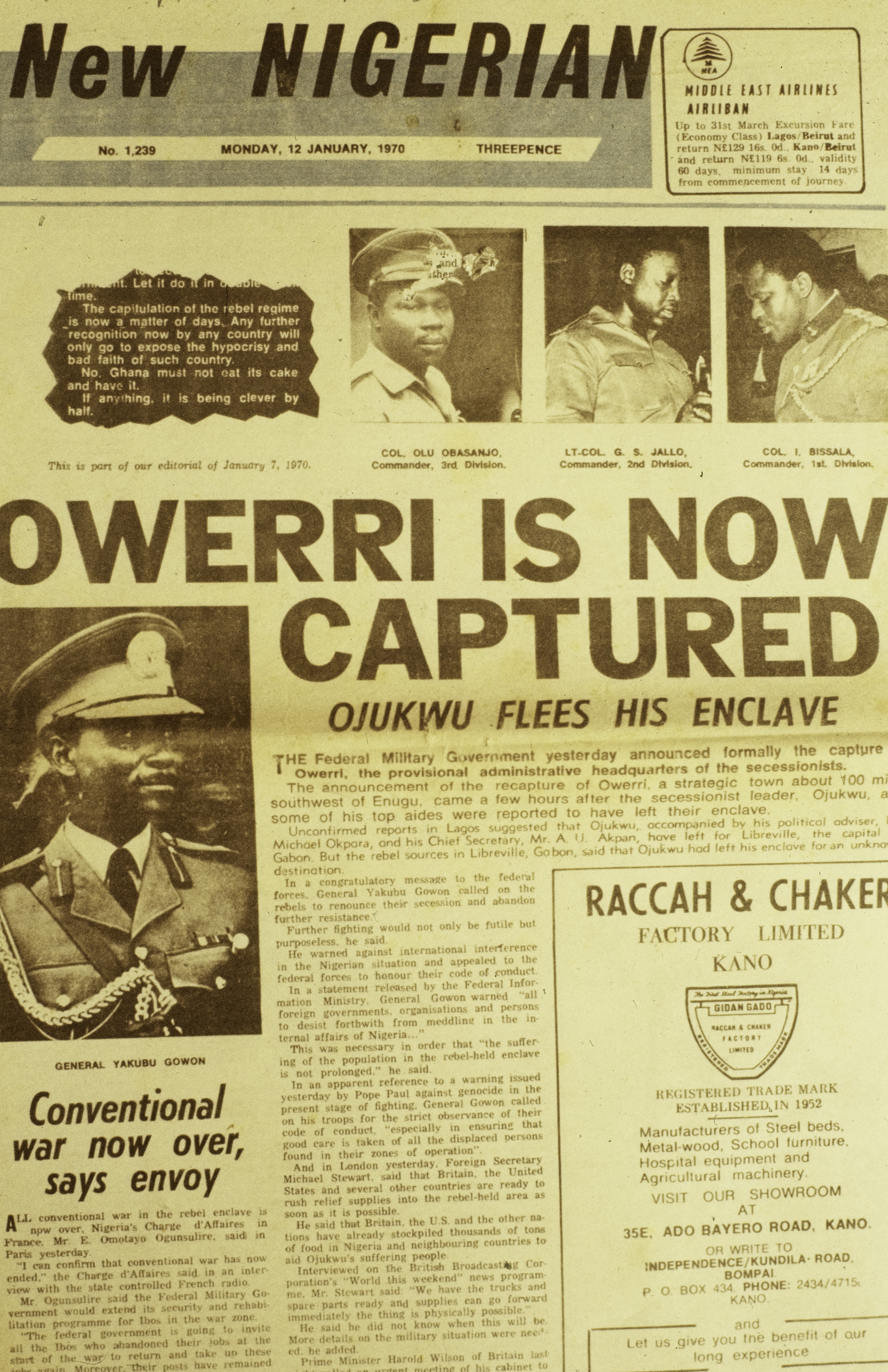
New Nigerian newspaper page 7 January 1970. End of the Nigerian civil war with Biafra. "Owerri is now captured. Ojukwu flees his enclave". Photographs of the military Obasanjo, Jallo, Bissalo, Gowon

With increased British support, the Nigerian federal forces launched their final offensive against the Biafrans once again on 23 December 1969, with a major thrust by the 3rd Marine Commando Division. The division was commanded by Col. Olusegun Obasanjo (who later became president twice), which succeeded in splitting the Biafran enclave into two by the end of the year. The final Nigerian offensive, named "Operation Tail-Wind", was launched on 7 January 1970 with the 3rd Marine Commando Division attacking, and supported by the 1st Infantry division to the north and the 2nd Infantry division to the south. The Biafran towns of Owerri fell on 9 January, and Uli on 11 January. Only a few days earlier, Ojukwu fled into exile by plane to the Ivory Coast, leaving his deputy Philip Effiong to handle the details of the surrender to General Yakubu Gowon of the Federal Army on 13 January 1970. The surrender paper was signed on 14 January 1970 in Lagos and thus came the end of the civil war and renunciation of secession. Fighting ended a few days later, with the Nigerian forces advancing into the remaining Biafran-held territories, which was met with little resistance.

After the war, Gowon said, "The tragic chapter of violence is just ended. We are at the dawn of national reconciliation. Once again we have an opportunity to build a new nation. My dear compatriots, we must pay homage to the fallen, to the heroes who have made the supreme sacrifice that we may be able to build a nation, great in justice, fair trade, and industry."

== Legacy ==
=== Atrocities against the Igbos ===
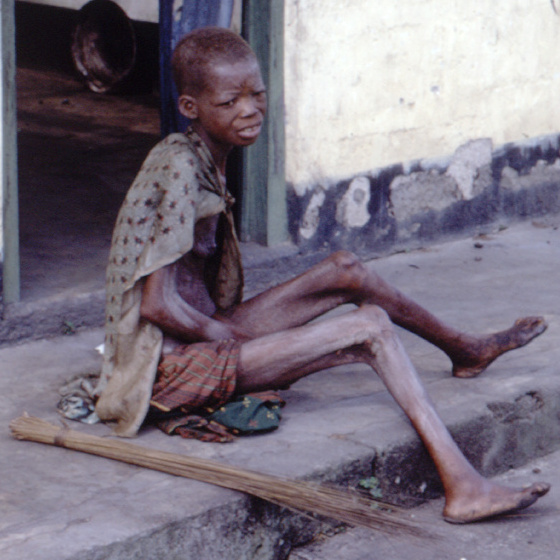
A severely malnourished woman during the war

The war cost the Igbos a great deal in terms of lives, money and infrastructure. It has been estimated that up to one million people may have died due to the conflict, most from hunger and disease caused by Nigerian forces. More than half a million people died from the famine imposed deliberately through blockade throughout the war. Lack of medicine also contributed. Thousands of people starved to death every day as the war progressed. The International Committee of the Red Cross in September 1968 estimated 8,000 to 10,000 deaths from starvation each day. The leader of a Nigerian peace conference delegation said in 1968 that "starvation is a legitimate weapon of war and we have every intention of using it against the rebels". This stance is generally considered to reflect the policy of the Nigerian government. The federal Nigerian army is accused of further atrocities including deliberate bombing of civilians, mass slaughter with machine guns, and rape.

=== Igbo nationalism ===
The first generation of Igbo nationalism began to develop in the immediate aftermath of the war.

Despite the eventual defeat of Biafra and the reintegration of the Igbo into Nigeria, the legacy of the war and the persecution the Igbo experienced continued to shape their political and social realities.

In the aftermath of the war, the Nigerian government made efforts to reintegrate the Igbo into the country, but many Igbo people continued to feel politically and economically marginalized. The southeastern region of Nigeria, which is predominantly Igbo, remained underdeveloped, and the Igbo were excluded from key political and military positions. This exclusion continued in the following decades, with the Igbo people experiencing systemic discrimination and a lack of access to resources and power in the Nigerian state. Despite their significant economic contributions, particularly in agriculture and oil production, the Igbo have struggled to gain political influence, especially in the context of the Nigerian presidency.

In recent years, the persecution of the Igbo has taken a new form, with pro-Biafran groups such as the Indigenous People of Biafra (IPOB) and the Movement for the Actualization of the Sovereign State of Biafra (MASSOB) emerging as key voices advocating for either the restoration of Biafra or greater autonomy for the southeastern region. These groups, particularly IPOB, have organized protests and civil disobedience campaigns to demand justice for the Igbo people. In response, the Nigerian government has often deployed military forces to suppress these movements, leading to reports of human rights abuses, extrajudicial killings, and mass arrests. The actions of the government have been perceived by many as an extension of the state-sponsored persecution that has long been a part of the Igbo experience.

The global Igbo diaspora has played a crucial role in raising awareness of the persecution the Igbo face, both in Nigeria and abroad. Many members of the diaspora have used their platforms to advocate for the rights and recognition of the Igbo people, drawing international attention to their plight. The diaspora has also provided financial support for pro-Biafran movements and helped amplify calls for justice and the restoration of Igbo dignity on the global stage.

The persecution of the Igbo people continues to influence the present. While the historical persecutions cannot be undone, addressing the systemic issues of political and economic marginalization faced by the Igbo is essential for healing the wounds of the past.

=== Ethnic minorities in Biafra ===
Ethnic minorities (Annang, Ibibio, Ijaw, Ogoni and others) made up approximately 40% of the Biafran population in 1966. The attitude of ethnic minorities in Biafra towards the conflict were initially divided early in the war. Having suffered the same fate as Igbos in the North, they held the same fear and dread as Igbos. However, actions by Biafra authorities suggesting they favoured the Igbo majority turned these attitudes negative. Great suspicion was directed towards ethnic minorities and opponents of Biafra, with 'combing' exercises conducted to sift these communities for saboteurs, or 'sabo,' as they were commonly branded. This brand was widely feared, as it generally resulted in death by the Biafran forces or even mobs. The accusations subjected entire communities to violence in the form of killings, rapes, kidnapping and internments in camps by Biafran forces. The Biafran Organization of Freedom Fighter (BOFF) was a paramilitary organisation set up by the civil defence group with instructions to suppress the enemy, and engaged in "combing" exercises in minority communities.

Minorities in Biafra suffered atrocities at the hands of those fighting for both sides of the conflict. The pogroms in the north in 1966 were indiscriminately directed against people from Eastern Nigeria. Despite a seemingly natural alliance between these victims of the pogroms in the north, tensions rose as minorities, who had always harboured an interest in having their own state within the Nigerian federation, were suspected of collaborating with Federal troops to undermine Biafra. The Federal troops were equally culpable of this crime. In the Rivers area, ethnic minorities sympathetic to Biafra were killed in the hundreds by federal troops. In Calabar, some 2000 Efiks were also killed by Federal troops. Outside of the Biafra, atrocities were recorded against the residents of Asaba in present-day Delta State by both sides of the conflict.

=== Genocide question ===
Legal scholar Herbert Ekwe-Ekwe and other academics argued that the Biafran war was a genocide, for which no perpetrators have been held accountable. Critics of this position acknowledge that starvation policies were pursued deliberately and that accountability has not been sought for the 1966 pogroms, but suggest that claims of genocide are incongruous with the fact that the Igbo were not exterminated after the war ended, alongside other arguments such as a lack of clarity surrounding Nigerian intentions and that Nigeria was fighting to retain control of Biafra and its people rather than to expel or exterminate them. Biafra made a formal complaint of genocide against Igbos to the International Committee on the Investigation of Crimes of Genocide, a Paris-based NGO of international lawyers, which concluded that the actions undertaken by the Nigerian government against the Igbo amounted to a genocide. With special reference to the Asaba Massacre, jurist Emma Okocha described the killings as "the first black-on-black genocide". Ekwe-Ekwe places significant blame on the British government for their support of the Nigerian government, which he argued allowed for their depredations against the Igbo to continue.

=== Reconstruction ===
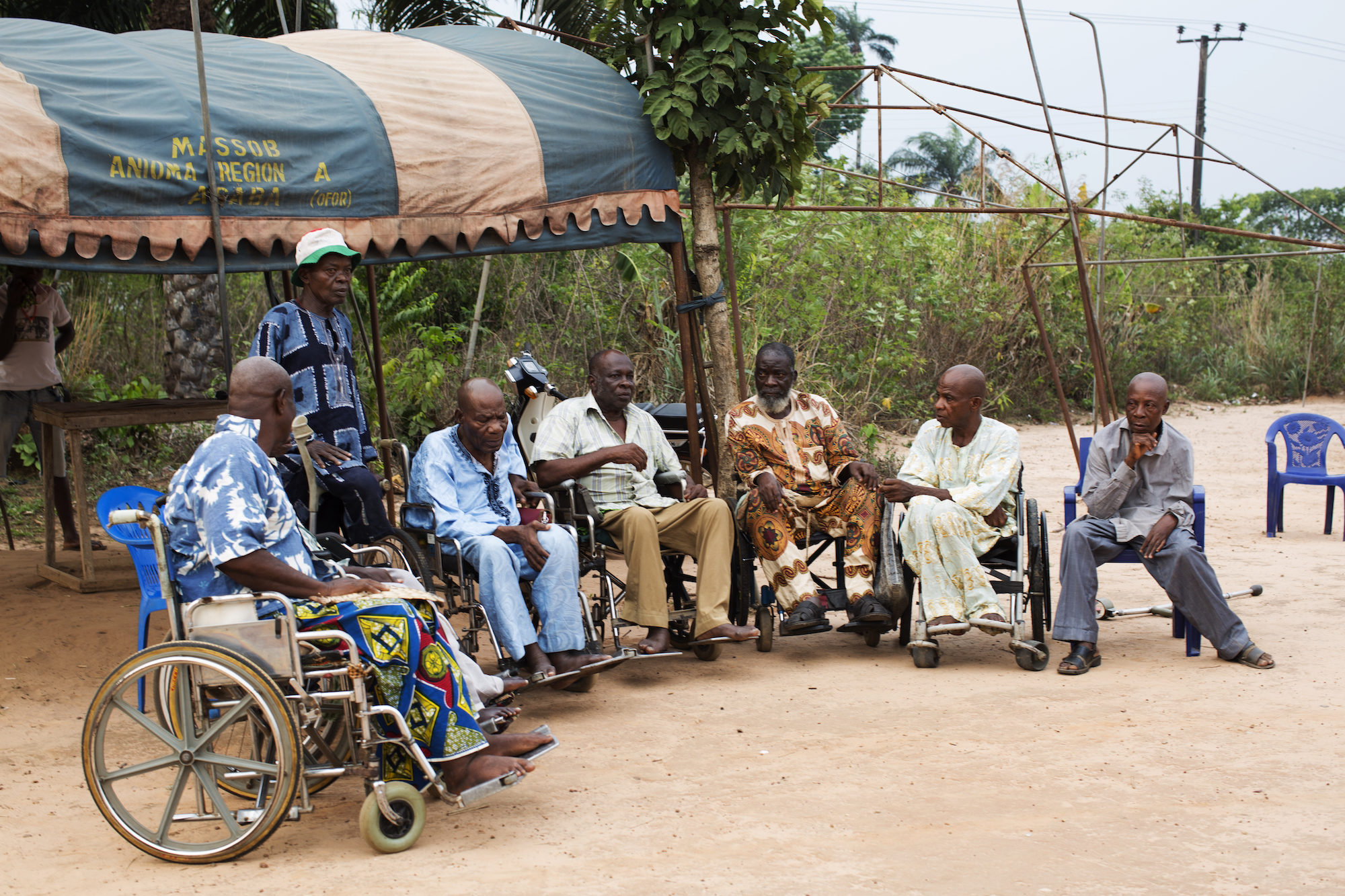
Disabled Biafran war veterans in 2017

Accusations were made of Nigerian government officials diverting resources meant for reconstruction in the former Biafran areas to their ethnic areas. Military government continued in power in Nigeria for many years, and people in the oil-producing areas claimed they were being denied a fair share of oil revenues. Laws were passed mandating that political parties could not be ethnically or tribally based; however, it has been hard to make this work in practice.

Igbos who ran for their lives during the pogroms and war returned to find their positions had been taken; and the government did not feel any need to re-instate them, preferring to regard them as having resigned. This reasoning was also extended to Igbo-owned properties and houses. People from other regions were quick to take over any house owned by an Igbo, especially in the Port Harcourt area. The Nigerian Government justified this by terming such properties abandoned. This, however, has led to a feeling of injustice as the Nigerian government policies were seen as further economically disabling the Igbos even long after the war. Further feelings of injustice were caused by Nigeria changing its currency, so that Biafran supplies of pre-war Nigerian currency were no longer honoured. At the end of the war, it was said that only N£20 was given to any easterner, regardless of the amount of money he or she had had in the bank. This was applied irrespective of their banking in pre-war Nigerian currency or Biafran currency. This was seen as a deliberate policy to hold back the Igbo middle class, leaving them with little wealth to expand their business interests.

=== Fall of Biafra and restoration attempts ===
On 29 May 2000, The Guardian reported that President Olusegun Obasanjo commuted to retirement the dismissal of all military persons who fought for the breakaway state of Biafra during the Nigerian civil war. In a national broadcast, he said that the decision was based on the principle that "justice must at all times be tempered with mercy."

Biafra was more or less wiped off the map until its resurrection by the contemporary Movement for the Actualisation of the Sovereign State of Biafra. Chinua Achebe's last book, There Was a Country: A Personal History of Biafra, has also rekindled discussion of the war. In 2012, the Indigenous People of Biafra (IPOB) separatist movement was founded, led by Nnamdi Kanu. In 2021, tensions between IPOB and the Nigerian government escalated into the violent Orlu Crisis, with IPOB declaring that the "second Nigeria/Biafra war" had begun. The separatists vowed that this time, Biafra would win.

=== South-East Freedom Fight ===
Nnamdi Kanu's ascent to prominence and the meteoric rise of the Indigenous People of Biafra (IPOB) is a complex narrative deeply intertwined with the socio-political fabric of Nigeria. Kanu, a charismatic and outspoken leader, gained attention through his vocal advocacy for the rights of the Igbo people and the call for an independent state of Biafra in south-eastern Nigeria. His platform, IPOB, emerged as a formidable force, rallying support both within Nigeria and among the Igbo diaspora globally. The movement tapped into deep-seated grievances stemming from historical injustices, marginalization, and perceived neglect of the Igbo ethnic group within the Nigerian state. Kanu's ability to leverage social media and online platforms amplified his message, resonating with a significant segment of the Igbo population disillusioned with the Nigerian government. Despite facing legal challenges and government crackdowns, Kanu's influence continued to grow, symbolizing a resurgence of Biafran identity and aspirations for self-determination within Nigeria's complex political landscape.

=== Intergenerational impacts ===
According to a 2021 study, "War exposure among women [in the Biafran war] results in reduced adult stature, an increased likelihood of being overweight, earlier age at first birth, and lower educational attainment. War exposure of mothers has adverse impacts on next-generation child survival, growth, and education. Impacts vary with age of exposure."

== See also ==
- Biafra
- Igbo people
- List of civil wars
- Post-war Igbo economic dispossession
