= Post-war Igbo economic dispossession =

Economic policies of the Nigerian government

After the Nigerian Civil War which lasted from 1967 to 1970, the federal and states governments in Nigerian implemented decrees and policies that substantially affected the Igbo's by stripping them of their socio-economic assets, including property, and opportunities. Some of these include currency exchange, seizure of properties, dismissal from the military, and direct exclusion from benefiting from economic reform legislation, which systemically and structurally put the Igbos at a disadvantage in the post-war Nigerian economy.

== See also ==
- Nigerian Civil War
- Biafra
- Igbo people
- Yakubu Gowon
- Obafemi Awolowo
- Chukwuemeka Odumegwu Ojukwu
- Nnamdi Azikiwe
