= Anglo-Aro War =

1901–1902 war in present-day Eastern Nigeria

- Part of the Scramble for Africa
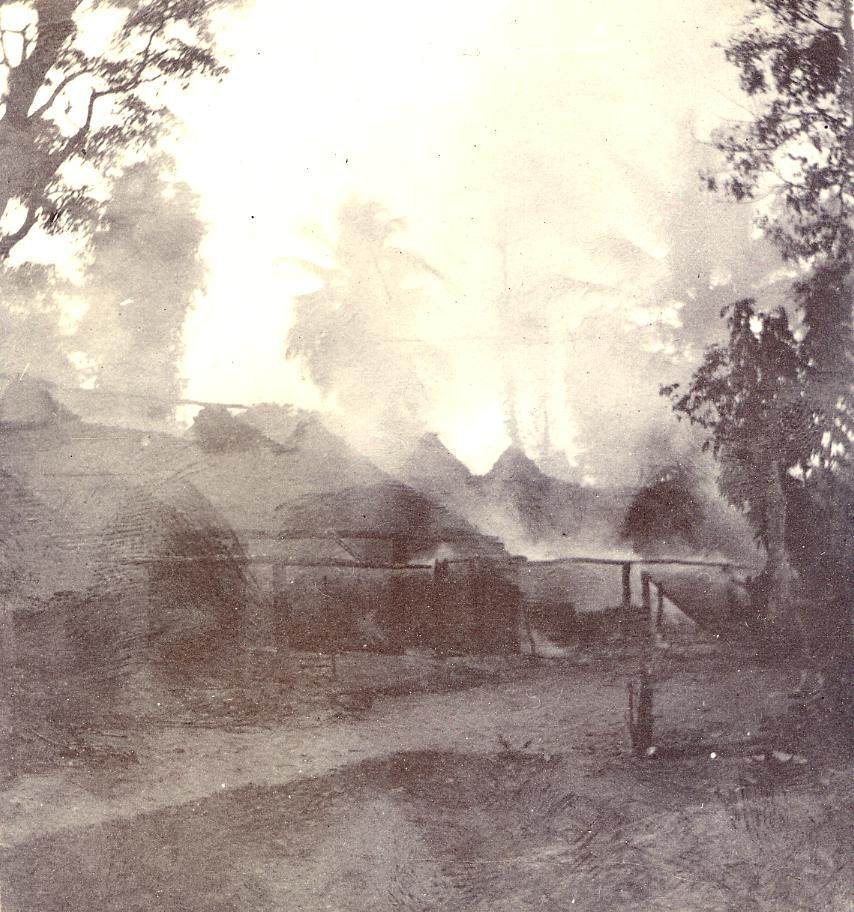
- A photograph of Arochukwu burning 1901–1902
Date	November 1901 – March 1902
Location	Nigeria
Result	British victory

Belligerents
Britain	Aro Confederacy

Commanders and leaders
Arthur Montanaro; Alexander Jackson; Arthur Mackenzie (WIA); Arthur Festing; William Heneker	Kanu Okoro; Okori Torti

Strength
1,637	7,500+

Casualties and losses
~700–800 killed or wounded	Heavy

The Anglo-Aro War (1901–1902) was a conflict between the Aro Confederacy in present-day Eastern Nigeria, and the British Empire. The war began after increasing tension between Aro leaders and the British after years of failed negotiations.

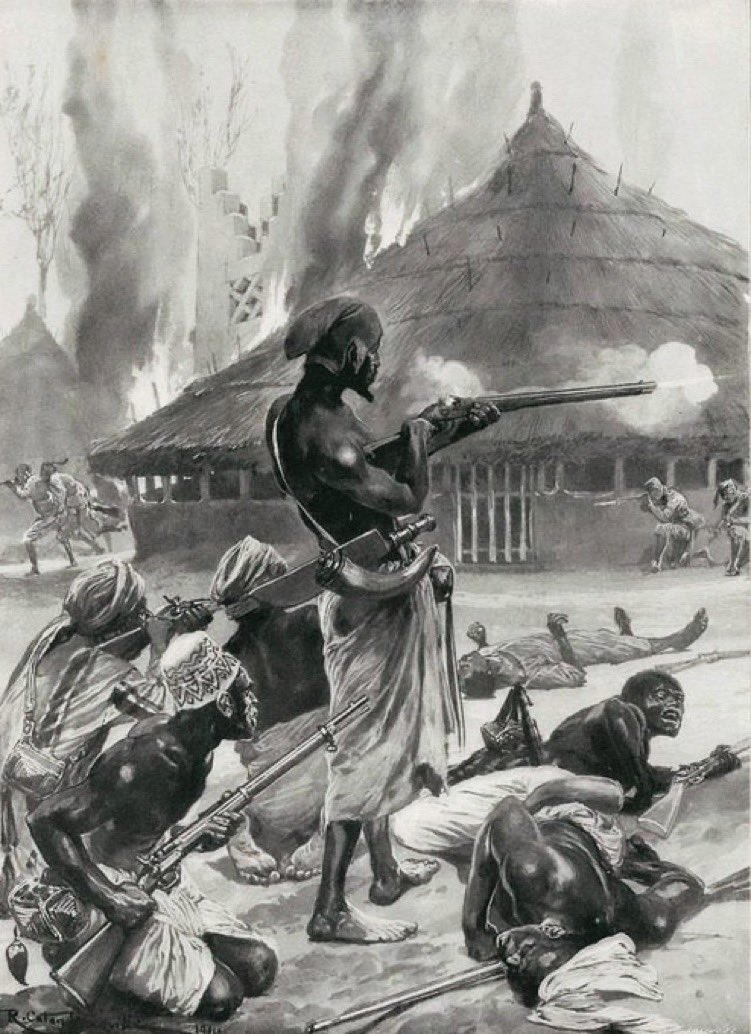
"The Opening Up of Nigeria, the Expedition Against the Aros by Richard Caton Woodville II" 1901

== Cause of the war ==
The Aro Confederacy, whose powers extended across Eastern Nigeria and beyond, was challenged in the last decades of the 19th century by increasing British colonial penetration of the hinterland. The Aro people and their allies resisted the British penetration due to a combination of factors, included economic, political and religious concerns.

Reasons for the war advanced by Sir Ralph Moor, the British High Commissioner of the Nigerian Coast Protectorate, included:

To put a stop to slave dealing and the slave trade generally with a view to the Slave Dealing Proclamation No. 5 of 1901 being enforced throughout the entire territories as from first of January next; to abolish the Juju hierarchy of the Aro tribe, which by superstition and fraud causes much injustice among the coast tribes generally and is opposed to the establishment of Government. The power of the priesthood is also employed in obtaining natives for sale as slaves and it is essential to finally break it; to open up the country of the entire Aro to civilization; to induce the natives to engage in legitimate trade; to introduce a currency in lieu of slaves, brass rods, and other forms of native currency and to facilitate trade transactions; to eventually establish a labour market as a substitute to the present system of slavery.

According to American scholar Jeffrey Ian Ross, the Aro peoples usage of divinatory practices in shrines dedicated to the god Ibin Ukpabi was a critical element in their slavery practises, which was one of the factors that led to the outbreak of the Anglo-Aro War.

While according to local historian Adiele Afigbo, the main stated purpose of the British in the Anglo-Aro War of 1901–1902 was to suppress the slave trade still being carried on by some African states in what is now Nigeria.

== Aro opposition ==
The Aros had long opposed British colonial penetration in the hinterland, with such opposition being motivated in part by economic concern. They also opposed the efforts of British missionaries to introduce Christianity, which threatened their religious influence through their oracle Ibini Ukpabi. The Aro-led raids and invasions on communities were conducted in order to undermine British colonial penetration since the 1890s. While the British prepared for the invasion of Arochukwu in November 1901, the Aro launched their last major offensive before the Aro Expedition by British forces. Aro forces led by Okoro Toti sacked Obegu (a British ally) which resulted in 400 people dying. This attack quickened British preparation for their offensive.

== Aro expedition ==
Sir Ralph Moor and the Royal Niger Company had planned the attack on the Aros and the Ibini Ukpabi oracle since September 1899 but due to lack of necessary manpower, it was delayed until November 1901. On November 28, Lt. Col. Arthur Forbes Montanaro led 87 officers, 1,550 soldiers and 2,100 carriers in four axes of advance to Arochukwu from Oguta, Akwete, Unwana and Itu on a counter-insurgency campaign. As expected, Aro forces resisted all axes strongly, although they lacked modern weapons. However, Arochukwu was captured on December 28 after four days of fierce battles in and around the city. As a result, the Ibini Ukpabi shrine was allegedly blown up. Battles between British and Aro forces continued throughout the region until spring 1902 when Aro forces were defeated in the last major battle at Bende. The Aro Expedition ended three weeks later.

== Result of the war ==
Some of the Aro leaders, like Okoro Toti, were arrested, tried by tribunals, and hanged. The power hitherto held by the Aro Confederacy quickly evaporated and Eze Kanu Okoro (king of Arochukwu), went into hiding but was later arrested. Although Aro dominance crumbled in March 1902, many Aros took part in guerilla campaigns against the British in the region such as in Afikpo (1902–1903), Ezza (1905), and other areas where the Aro had a particularly significant presence. The defeat of the Aro did help the British to open up the interior, but serious opposition to British colonial penetration in Igboland clearly did not end with the Anglo-Aro War. In the years that followed, the British had to deal with many other conflicts and wars in various parts of Igboland such as the Nri Conflict (1905–1911), Ekumeku War (1883–1914), Igbo Women's War (1929), etc.
