= Jeffrey Ian Ross =

American scholar, professor, and criminologist

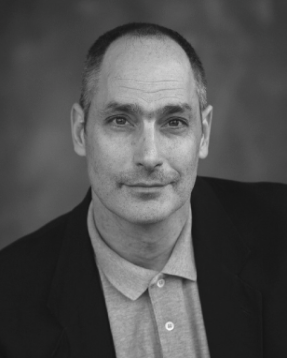
- Jeffrey Ian Ross
- Born: Jeffrey Ian Ross
- Occupations: Professor, author, criminologist

Jeffrey Ian Ross is a scholar, professor, and criminologist specializing in the fields of policing, corrections, political crime, violence, street culture, graffiti and street art, and crime and justice in American Indian communities. Since 1998 Ross has been a professor at the University of Baltimore. He is a former co-chair and chair of the Division of Critical Criminology and Social Justice of the American Society of Criminology. Ross is an author, co-author, editor, and co-editor of numerous books.

He is also co-founder of the Convict Criminology approach in the field of Criminology/Criminal Justice.

== Education ==
In 1979, Ross gained admittance to the pre-University program at the University of Toronto, graduating in 1985 with a bachelor's degree in Political Science and Psychology. While attending the University of Toronto, Ross worked first as a crisis intervention counselor at Toronto East General Hospital and then both part-time and full-time for four years at Metro Toronto Forensic Services, a state run correctional facility. In 1985, Ross began his master's of political science degree at the University of Colorado (Boulder) under the supervision of Ted Robert Gurr. He graduated with a PhD in 1993.

== Career ==
From 1990 to 1991, while completing his doctorate, Ross worked as Research Associate at the International Center for Comparative Criminology at the University of Montreal. He began as an Assistant Professor of Political Science at the University of Lethbridge, Alberta in 1991. Two years later, Ross worked as an Assistant Professor for the Department of Criminal Justice Sciences, Kent State University. From 1995 to 1998, he worked as Social Science Analyst for the National Institute of Justice. He later started as a Visiting Professor in the Division of Criminology, Criminal Justice, and Social Policy at the University of Baltimore in 1998; after fourteen years, he was promoted to Full Professor in the School of Criminal Justice at University of Baltimore. Ross, has been a visiting professor at Ruhr University Bochum (2017) and University of Padua (2019). Ross was the co-chair of the Division on Critical Criminology and Social Justice of the American Society of Criminology.

=== Research ===
Ross’ scholarship has included work in the fields of criminology/criminal justice and conflict studies.

=== Oppositional political terrorism ===
His earliest research is in the field of oppositional political terrorism (OPT). Ross has specialized in the causal dynamics of OPT. Using quantitative research, Ross developed Attributes of Terrorism in Canada (ATIC), the first data base on OPT in Canada, which was later acquired by the Solicitor General of Canada. This research led Ross to be an expert witness for the Canadian Senate's Special Committee on Terrorism and Public Safety (1986). This source of data, was used in a series of quantitative research studies Ross conducted during the late 1980s and early 1990s.

=== Policing ===
In the field of policing, Ross has examined the challenges facing police departments operating in both western and non-western communities; how incidents of police violence/excessive force come to public attention, and whether this sets an agenda for the police organization to change; and the myths of community policing. Ross has written two books in this area: Making News of Police Violence (Praeger, 2000), and Policing Issues: Challenges and Controversies (Jones and Bartlett, 2011).

=== Corrections ===
Ross’ research in the area of corrections has focused on understanding problems in this branch of the criminal justice system. Ross is also interested in high security prisons, and edited The Globalization of Supermax Prisons (Rutgers University Press, 2013). Ross is the co-author of Behind Bars: Surviving Prison (Alpha Books, 2002) and Beyond Bars: Rejoining Society After Prison (Alpha Books, 2009).

=== Political crime/state crime ===
Ross wrote The Dynamics of Political Crime (Sage, 2002), and the follow-up book Introduction to Political Crime (Policy Press, 2012). In the field of state crime, the bulk of Ross’ research has focused on the problem of controlling state crime. This has led to two edited books: Controlling State Crime: An Introduction, (Transaction Publishers, 2000) and Varieties of State Crime and Its Control (Criminal Justice Press, 2000).

=== Street Culture and Graffiti ===
Ross has conducted and published a considerable amount of scholarship on graffiti, street art, and street culture, including articles, chapters in edited books, and the Routledge Handbook of Graffiti and Street Art (2016/2019), and Routledge Handbook of Street Culture (2021).

=== Crime and justice in American Indian communities ===
Ross has also published in the area of crime and justice in American Indian communities. This includes (with Larry Gould) Native Americans and the Criminal Justice System (Paradigm Publishers, 2006), and American Indians at Risk (ABC-Clio, 2014).

== Publications ==
Ross has authored, co-authored, edited and co-edited a number of books in the fields of criminology and criminal justice:

- Controlling State Crime (1995/2000)
- Violence in Canada: Sociopolitical Perspectives (1995/2004)
- Cutting the Edge: Current Perspectives in Radical/Critical Criminology and Criminal Justice (1998/2009)
- Making News of Police Violence: A Comparative Study of Toronto and New York City (2000)
- Varieties of State Crime and Its Control (2000)
- Behind Bars: Surviving Prison (2002; with Stephen C. Richards)
- Convict Criminology (2002; with Stephen C. Richards)
- Dynamics Of Political Crime (2002)
- Native Americans and the Criminal Justice System (2006; with Larry Gould)
- Political Terrorism: An Interdisciplinary Approach (2006)
- Will Terrorism End? (2006)
- Special Problems in Corrections (2008)
- Beyond Bars: Rejoining Society After Prison (2009; with Stephen C. Richards)
- Cybercrime (2009)
- Religion and Violence: An Encyclopedia of Faith and Conflict from Antiquity to the Present (2010)
- Policing Issues: Challenges & Controversies (2012)
- An Introduction to Political Crime (2012)
- Encyclopedia of Street Crime in America (2013)
- The Globalization of Supermax Prisons (2013)
- American Indians at Risk (2014)
- Key Issues in Corrections (2016)
- Routledge Handbook of Graffiti and Street Art (2016)
- Routledge Handbook of Street Culture (2021)
- Convict Criminology for the Future (2021; with Francesca Vianello)

=== Honors ===
A number of Ross’ books have won awards. Making News of Police Violence earned Society for the Study of Social Problems, Crime and Juvenile Delinquency Division Outstanding Scholar Award, 2001/2002. His Encyclopedia of Street Crime in America, earned the Booklist 2013 Editor's Choice Award and the Library Journal Best Reference 2013. The Globalization of Supermax Prisons was awarded the 2013 “Choice Outstanding Academic Title award” by Choice Magazine, and American Indians at Risk was named to the American Library Association's 2015 Outstanding References Sources List, January, 2015.

Ross has also been awarded a handful of career related awards.

In 2017, Ross was awarded a Deutscher Akademischer Austausch Dienst – (DAAD), German Academic Exchange Service Scholarship.

In 2018 Ross was awarded the Hans Mattick Award, "for an individual who has made a distinguished contribution to the field of criminology & criminal justice practice," from the Center for Research in Law & Justice at the University of Illinois at Chicago and in 2020, he was given the John Howard Award from the Academy of Criminal Justice Sciences (ACJS)’ Division of Corrections.

In 2020, Ross was awarded the John Keith Irwin Distinguished Professor Award by the Division of Convict Criminology, (part of the American Society of Criminology).

== Personal life ==
Ross lives in Washington, D.C. He is married to Natasha J. Cabrera, a developmental psychologist and professor at the University of Maryland.
