= Catherine Tamis-LeMonda =

American psychologist and academic

- Education: New York University
- Occupations: Professor of Applied Psychology, New York University

Catherine Tamis-LeMonda is a developmental psychologist and professor of applied psychology at New York University (NYU). She is an expert on parenting practices and the influence of parent-child social interaction on language, cognitive, and social development. She has co-edited numerous volumes on parenting and early child development including the Handbook of Father Involvement: Multidisciplinary Perspectives (with Natasha J. Cabrera) and Child Psychology: A Handbook of Contemporary Issues (with Lawrence Balter) and Gender Roles in Immigrant Families (with Susan Chuang).

Tamis-LeMonda is a Fellow of the Association for Psychological Science. She has served as an expert consultant on infant and child development for The New York Times, Discovery Channel, American Baby magazine, Scientific American, and The Wall Street Journal. She serves as an associate editor of the Journal of Experimental Psychology: General and Infancy.

== Biography ==
Tamis-LeMonda graduated magna cum laude with her Bachelor of Arts degree in psychology from New York University (NYU) in 1983. She went on to complete her PhD in experimental psychology with a concentration in developmental psychology at NYU in 1987, working under the supervision of Marc Bornstein. She joined the faculty of the Department of Applied Psychology at NYU Steinhardt in 1991 and was promoted to full professor in 2002.

Tamis-LeMonda has received multiple grants for her research on parenting, child development, and school success from the National Institute of Child Health and Human Development, National Institute of Mental Health, the Ford Foundation, the Robin Hood Foundation, and the National Science Foundation. She serves as an appointed member of the Committee on Fostering School Success for English Learners: Toward New Directions in Policy, Practice, and Research of the National Academies of Sciences, Engineering, and Medicine.

== Research ==
Tamis-LeMonda's research program examines the impact of parental involvement on children's language and cognitive skills. Her early work emphasized sensitive and responsive parenting (i.e., maternal sensitivity), defined as the ability to perceive and infer infants' communicative intentions and respond to them appropriately, as a crucial factor promoting children's language development. In later studies, Tamis-LeMonda and colleagues examined the involvement of fathers as well as mothers in their children's development. An especially influential paper titled Fatherhood in the Twenty-First Century discussed the impact of various factors that influence children's upbringing, such as women's contributions to the labor force, the role of fathers in families where both parents reside at home, the detachment and distance of fathers who do not reside with their children, and cultural diversity in parenting practices.

Tamis-LeMonda has been involved in many large-scale longitudinal studies of children growing up in low-income families, including the Early Head Start Research and Evaluation Project. One of Tamis-LeMonda's more recent studies examined longitudinal relationships between the early learning environments of toddlers assessed at 14 months, 2 and 3 years and their academic skills at 5th grade. The study found mothers' engagement with their toddlers in book reading and conversation and the provision of developmentally appropriate learning materials to be strong predictors of children's subsequent cognitive development and school success. This study also documented adverse effects of stress associated with single parenting, teenage parenting, and financial hardship on children's academic success.

== Representative publications ==
- Cabrera, N.; Tamis-LeMonda, C. S.; Bradley, R. H.; Hofferth, S.; Lamb, M. E. (2000). "Fatherhood in the twenty‐first century". Child Development. 71 (1): 127–136. doi:10.1111/1467-8624.00126. hdl:2027.42/65867. PMID 10836566. S2CID 16879770.
- Tamis-LeMonda, C. S.; Bornstein, M. H.; Baumwell, L. (2001). "Maternal responsiveness and children's achievement of language milestones". Child Development. 72 (3): 748–767. doi:10.1111/1467-8624.00313. PMID 11405580. S2CID 6065496.
- Tamis-LeMonda, C. S.; Shannon, J. D.; Cabrera, N. J.; Lamb, M. E. (2004). "Fathers and mothers at play with their 2‐and 3‐year‐olds: contributions to language and cognitive development". Child Development. 75 (6): 1806–1820. doi:10.1111/j.1467-8624.2004.00818.x. PMID 15566381. S2CID 8236500.
