= Natasha J. Cabrera =

Canadian developmental psychologist

- Occupation: Professor of Human Development

Academic background
- Education: University of Toronto; University of Denver

Academic work
- Institutions: University of Maryland, College Park

Natasha J. Cabrera is a Canadian developmental psychologist known for her research on children's cognitive and social development, focusing primarily on fathers' involvement and influence on child development, ethnic and cultural variations in parenting behaviors, and factors associated with developmental risk. She holds the position of Professor in the Department of Human Development and Quantitative Methods at the University of Maryland, College of Education, where she is Director of the Family Involvement Laboratory and affiliated with the Maryland Population Research Center. Cabrera also holds the position of Secretary on the Governing Council of the Society for the Research on Child Development and has served as associate editor of Early Childhood Research Quarterly and Child Development. Her research has been featured in The Wall Street Journal, Education Week, Time, and The Atlantic.

Cabrera is co-editor of several books, including From welfare to child care: What happens to young children when single mothers exchange welfare for work, Handbook of U.S. Latino Psychology: Developmental and community-based perspectives, Latina and Latino Child Psychology and Mental Health, and Handbook of Father Involvement: Multidisciplinary Perspectives.

== Biography ==
Cabrera graduated from the University of Toronto with BS degree in psychology in 1985 and MS degree in Philosophy of Education in 1989. She attended graduate school at the University of Denver, School of Education, where she obtained her Ph.D. in Educational and Developmental Psychology in 1994.

After graduation, Cabrera worked as Study Director for the Roundtable on Head Start Research, Commission on Behavioral and Social Sciences and Education, Board on Children and Families National Research Council of the National Academy of Sciences from 1995 to 1996. She held the position of Executive Branch Fellow, sponsored by the Society for Research on Child Development (SRCD) under the auspices of the American Association for the Advancement of Science at the National Institute of Child Health and Human Development (NICHD) from 1996 to 1998. Cabrera worked at the NICHD as an Expert in Child Development before joining the faculty of the University of Maryland in 2002. While at NICHD, Cabrera received the On-the-Spot Award, Individual Merit Award and Staff Recognition Award in 1997, 1999, and 2000, and the Administration for Children and Families, United States Department of Health and Human Service Secretary's Distinguished Service Award and Fatherhood Leadership Award in 2000 and 2003.

Cabrera's research on the influence of fathers in children's development has been supported by grants from the National Institutes of Health.

== Research ==
Cabrera is known for her work addressing how fathers' involvement impacts children's development—a topic that has received considerably less research attention than mothers' participation in children's lives. By focusing on fathers' involvement in relation to family and child outcomes, her research furthers understanding of parenting behaviors that impact children's cognitive and emotional well-being.

Cabrera started her research by investigating the effects of fathers' involvement in the lives of children and families on existing social policies, such as child support, welfare, and others. By examining how modern social trends are changing fathers' contributions to child development, her research team has proposed several social programs and initiatives. As the next step in her work, Cabrera paid particular attention to an underrepresented group of ethnically diverse low-income families. In her studies, she argued that positive father-child interactions appeared to obviate potential cognitive delays associated with poverty. She claimed that fathers' socio-economic characteristics were uniquely associated with child developmental outcomes and highlighted how fathers' contributions in childcare should not be ignored.

Cabrera's work provides empirical evidence for the significant effect of father engagement on cognitive, emotional, social, and language development of children. She has argued that the quality of fathers' child-directed speech has a substantial contribution to children's receptive and expressive vocabulary skills. In addition, she has concluded that father-child relationship quality has the direct impact on children's peer-relationships and behavioral problems. Her co-authored article Explaining the long reach of fathers’ prenatal involvement on later paternal engagement with children was named Best Research Article regarding men in families by the National Council and Family Relations in 2009. In this article, Cabrera's team outlined important findings that unmarried fathers’ prenatal involvement was associated with their levels of paternal engagement when their child was one and three years of age.

In another paper Fathers Are Parents, Too! Widening the Lens on Parenting for Children's Development, Cabrera and her colleagues provided a summary of the direct and indirect impact of fathers' involvement on child development. In this article, the authors discussed several issues related to father-child interaction and presented recommendations that can help further research to advance understanding of the role of fathering in a child's life.

== Representative publications ==
- Cabrera, N., Fagan, J., & Farrie, D. (2008). Explaining the long reach of fathers’ prenatal involvement on later paternal engagement with children. Journal of Marriage and the Family. 70, 1094–1107.
- Cabrera, N., Fitzgerald, H. E., Bradley, R. H., & Roggman, L. (2007). Modeling the dynamics of paternal influences on children over the life course. Applied Development Science, 11(4), 185–189.
- Cabrera, N., Fitzgerald, H., Bradley, R., & Roggman, L. (2014). The ecology of father-child relationships: An expanded model. Journal of Family Theory and Review, 6, 336–354.
- Cabrera N. J, Hofferth, S., & Hancock, G. (2014). Family structure, maternal employment, and change in children's externalizing problem behavior: Differences by age and self-regulation. European Journal of Developmental Psychology, 11, 136–158.`
- Cabrera, N. J., Shannon, J. D., & Tamis-LeMonda, C. (2007). Fathers' influence on their children's cognitive and emotional development: From toddlers to pre-K. Applied Development Science, 11(4), 208–213.
- Cabrera, N., Tamis‐LeMonda, C., Bradley, R. H., Hofferth, S., & Lamb, M. E. (2000). Fatherhood in the twenty‐first century. Child Development, 71(1), 127–136.
- Cabrera, N. J., Volling, B. L., & Barr, R. (2018). Fathers are parents, too! Widening the lens on parenting for children's development. Child Development Perspectives, 12(3), 152–157.
