= Operation Hiroshima =

1968 Biafran War operation

- Part of Biafran War
- Operation Hiroshima (Nigeria)
Date	15–29 November 1968 (2 weeks)
Location	Onitsha, Nigeria
Result	Nigerian victory

Belligerents
Nigeria	Biafra

Commanders and leaders
Ibrahim Haruna; Idris Garba	Rolf Steiner; Taffy Williams; Marc Goosens †

Strength
Unknown	4,000

Casualties and losses
Unknown	2,000

Operation Hiroshima was a military operation conducted during the Biafran War by the Biafran 4th Commando Brigade in an attempt to recapture Onitsha from the Nigerian 2nd Division. The operation ultimately resulted in failure and ended in the deaths of numerous local and foreign mercenaries and Biafran soldiers.

== Prelude ==
In October 1967 Col Murtala Mohammed of the Nigerian Army began bombardment of Onitsha and later led a 10-boat armada across the Niger River into the city. Nigerian soldiers looted and burned the Onitsha market to the ground, which gave the Biafrans time to re-organize and mount a counter-attack. The Biafrans managed to re-capture the city after a pincer movement from north and south devastated the Nigerian 2nd Division. After two more failed invasion attempts, Gen. Mohammed moved north and crossed the Niger River at Idah. The Nigerian 2nd Division and 6th Battalion moved south-west from Enugu and managed to get within 20 km of Onitsha by January 1968. On 24 March, the final battle for Onitsha lasted less than 24 hours before the Biafrans were forced to retreat to Nnewi. Ever since the beginning of the war, both Biafran and white mercenary officers had been struggling against each other for various reasons. In November 1968 the Biafran Gen. Alexander Madiebo and Vice President Philip Effiong managed to convince President Odumegwu Ojukwu to order the 4th Commando Brigade at Umuahia to mount an offensive against Nigerian positions at Onitsha through open terrain.

== Invasion ==
In early November 1968 the 4,000-strong Biafran 4th Commando Brigade moved northwards from Umuahia to Nkwelle, less than 10 km outside of Onitsha. On 15 November Colonel Rolf Steiner was ordered to launch an offensive operation coined "Operation Hiroshima". Steiner initially objected on the grounds that his troops were trained for guerrilla tactics, but was overruled. The operation was a full frontal attack across an open field. With no aerial support or any natural obstacles to hide behind, the attacking Biafran brigade was decimated by Nigerian machine gun fire and suffered heavy casualties.

The Welsh mercenary Major Taffy Williams ordered a unit of Biafran soldiers under the Belgian mercenary Marc Goossens to attack a Nigerian defensive position but were almost immediately forced to retreat after Goossens was shot dead. On 29 November the remaining 2,000 soldiers of the Biafran 4th Commando Brigade retreated from Onitsha, leaving Onitsha under complete Nigerian control for the rest of the war.

== Aftermath ==
Col. Steiner was paranoid of his fellow officers and began drinking heavily to help relieve panic attacks. On 6 December 1968 President Ojukwu ordered Col. Steiner to be questioned about his retreat from Onitsha at the State House in Umuahia. Steiner arrived drunk and belligerent, even demanding a beer and refusing it after complaining that the glass was too warm. Steiner got into an argument with one of Ojukwu's guards and came close to getting shot before Ojukwu stopped his guard from pulling the trigger. Far from being grateful, Steiner then turned his insults towards Ojukwu before being slapped across the face and taken out in handcuffs. Steiner was later deported to Gabon along with 5 other mercenaries while Maj. Taffy Williams was made commander of the 4th Commando Brigade.
