= Marc Goosens =

Belgian mercenary soldier

- Born: Belgium
- Died: 12 November 1968 Onitsha, Nigeria
- Allegiance: Belgium Republic of the Congo Kingdom of Yemen Republic of Biafra
- Battles / wars: Congo Crisis North Yemen Civil War Nigerian Civil War

Marc Goosens (died 12 November 1968) was a Belgian mercenary who fought in the Yemeni Civil War and served in the army of Biafra during the Nigerian Civil War. He was killed by Nigerian forces in Onitsha during Operation Hiroshima.

== Life ==
Goosens served as an officer in the Belgian Army and was a military advisor to the Congolese government during the Congo Crisis. During the civil war in Yemen, he and other Congo veterans trained royalist rebels. He participated in the Nigerian Civil War under the command of fellow mercenary Rolf Steiner, and he was one of the many foreign mercenaries who committed themselves to Biafra, a secessionist country that declared independence from Nigeria. During the unsuccessful attempt led by Welsh mercenary Taffy Williams to retake Onitsha from Nigerian forces, Goosens died after being shot in the liver. Under the title Biafra: Final Mission, Paris Match, a dramatic photo series published by Gilles Caron on November 30, 1968 showed Biafran soldiers carrying the body of Goosens. Goosens is one of the five fallen mercenaries to whom Frederick Forsyth dedicates his novel The Dogs of War. Goosens is said to be the model for the character of the mercenary 'Tiny' Marc Vlaminck in Forsyth's novel.

== Literature ==
- Frederick Forsyth: The Biafra Story. The Making of an African Legend. Barnsley, Yorkshire, England: Pen & Sword Books Ltd., 2007, ISBN 978-1-84415-523-1, S. 112–153
- Frederick Forsyth: Outsider. Die Autobiographie. C. Bertelsmann, München 2015, ISBN 978-3-570-10266-4, S. 258–262
- Anthony Mockler: The new mercenaries. Corgi Books, London 1986, ISBN 0-552-12558-X
