= MM1 =

MM1 may refer to:

- MM1 (US Navy rating), Machinist's mate First Class
- MM1 (MMS), a type of Multimedia Messaging Service interface
- Motocross Madness (1998 video game), a video game developed by Rainbow Studios
- Midtown Madness, a 1999 racing game developed by Angel Studios
- M/M/1 model, a single-server queuing model
- MM/1, the Multi-Media One was a successor to the TRS-80 Color Computer
- MM1 register, a CPU register used by the MMX extension
- Mega Man (video game), the first game in the Mega Man video game series
- Might and Magic Book One: The Secret of the Inner Sanctum, the first game in the Might and Magic video game series
- Hawk MM-1, semi-automatic grenade launcher
- Melbourne Metro, Stage 1 a proposed rail tunnel in Melbourne, Australia linking the Domain Interchange to North Melbourne railway station
- Milan Metro Line 1 (Italian Metropolitana di Milano, linea 1), first underground rapid transit line in Milan, Italy
- Modigliani–Miller theorem (proposition 1), a theorem on capital structure
- Line 1 (Mumbai Metro), also known as Mumbai Metro 1
