= The Dogs of War (film) =

1980 film by John Irvin

- Theatrical release poster by Tom Jung
- Directed by: John Irvin
- Screenplay by: Gary DeVore; George Malko
- Based on: The Dogs of War (1974 novel) by Frederick Forsyth
- Produced by: Larry DeWaay
- Starring: Christopher Walken; Tom Berenger; Colin Blakely
- Cinematography: Jack Cardiff
- Edited by: Antony Gibbs
- Music by: Geoffrey Burgon
- Production company: Juniper Films
- Distributed by: United Artists
- Release dates: 17 December 1980 (London, premiere); 18 December 1980 (UK); 13 February 1981 (US)
- Running time: 118 minutes
- Countries: United Kingdom; United States
- Language: English
- Budget: $8 million
- Box office: $5.4 million

The Dogs of War is a 1980 action-thriller war film directed by John Irvin and starring Christopher Walken, Tom Berenger and Colin Blakely. Based on Frederick Forsyth's 1974 novel, it follows a small mercenary unit of soldiers privately hired to depose the president of a fictional African country modeled on Guinea-Bissau, Guinea-Conakry, Equatorial Guinea and Angola (as they were in the late 1970s), so that a British tycoon can gain access to a platinum deposit. Norman Jewison was an executive producer.

The title is based on a phrase from William Shakespeare's play Julius Caesar: "Cry, 'Havoc!', and let slip the dogs of war."

A British and American co-production, The Dogs of War premiered on 17 December 1980, and was released in the United States by United Artists on 13 February 1981. It received mixed-to-positive reviews from critics.

== Plot ==
Having escaped from Central America with his comrades Drew Blakeley, Derek Godwin, Michel-Claude, Terry, and Richard, mercenary Jamie Shannon gets an offer from Endean, a British businessman working for a tycoon. Endean's company is interested in "certain resources" in the small African nation of Zangaro, which is run by the brutal dictator President Kimba.

Shannon goes to Zangaro's capital to meet British documentary film maker Alan North, who fills him in on the political situation. Shannon's activities, including a suspected dalliance with one of Kimba's mistresses, Gabrielle Dexter, get him arrested, severely beaten and imprisoned. His wounds are treated by Dr. Okoye, a physician and prisoner who was formerly a moderate political leader. North agitates for Shannon's release, and two days later he is deported.

When Shannon reports to Endean there is no chance of an internal coup, Endean offers him $100,000 to overthrow Kimba by invading Zangaro with a mercenary army so Endean's employer can install a puppet government. The new leader Colonel Bobi, is a greedy former ally of Kimba's and would allow Endean's employer to exploit the country's newly discovered platinum resources. Shannon refuses but when his estranged girlfriend Jessie rejects an offer of a new life in the Western U.S., he accepts Endean's contract conditional on his having full control of the military operation.

Shannon plans the invasion with Central American associates in London. The group illegally procures Uzi submachine guns, ammunition, rocket launchers, mines, and other weapons. North encounters Shannon by chance in London and suspects him of being a CIA agent. Shannon asks Drew to scare North away without hurting him, but North is killed by a hitman. Drew captures the assassin, and Shannon learns that Endean had sent the hitman to follow them. Furious that the hitman had killed North on his own initiative, Shannon kills the assassin in turn and leaves the body at Endean's house during a dinner party held for Colonel Bobi.

Shannon hires a small freighter and crew to transport the cadre to Zangaro and are joined at sea by a force of Zangaran exiles trained by a former mercenary colleague. The force lands at night and attacks the military garrison where Kimba lives. Drew encounters a young woman with a baby in the barracks courtyard, and she shoots him in the back with a pistol. The mercenaries storm the burning, bullet-scarred ruins of the garrison and Shannon blasts his way into Kimba's mansion. Kimba, caught stuffing packs of bills into a briefcase, tries to bribe Shannon, but Shannon kills him.

Endean arrives in the moring by helicopter with Colonel Bobi. Inside the presidential residence they find Shannon and Dr. Okoye waiting. Shannon introduces Dr. Okoye as Zangaro's new president, who tells Colonel Bobi that he is under arrest. Endean's protest ("This whole country's bought and paid for!") is met by Shannon telling him, "You're going to have to buy it all over again." Shannon shoots Bobi, and with Derek, and Michel load Drew's body onto a Land Rover. The mercenaries drive through the deserted streets of Clarence.

== Cast ==
- Christopher Walken as Jamie Shannon
- Tom Berenger as Drew Blakeley
- Colin Blakely as Alan North
- Hugh Millais as Endean
- Paul Freeman as Derek Godwin
- Jean-François Stévenin as Michel-Claude
- JoBeth Williams as Jessie
- Maggie Scott as Gabrielle Dennis
- Robert Urquhart as Captain Lockhart
- Winston Ntshona as Dr. Okoye
- Pedro Armendáriz Jr. as Central American Captain
- Harlan Cary Poe as Richard
- Ed O'Neill as Terry
- Shane Rimmer as Dr. Oaks
- Ernest Graves as Warner
- George Harris as Colonel Bobi
- David Schofield as Zimmer
- Terence Rigby as Hackett
- Jean-Pierre Kalfon as Benny Lambert
- Christopher Malcolm as Baker
- Gyearbuor Asante as Geoffrey
- Thomas Baptiste as Dexter
- Eddie Tagoe as Jinja
- Ilario Bisi-Pedro as President Kimba

Other cast members in the film include Olu Jacobs as a Zangoran immigration officer, Hugh Quarshie as a Zangoran officer, Randy Quaid as a cameraman, Kenny Ireland and Jim Broadbent as film crew members, Martin LaSalle as a Spanish customs officer, Diana Bracho as a nun, Dermot Crowley as a chauffeur, and Victoria Tennant as a party guest.

== Production ==
=== Development and writing ===
United Artists bought rights to the novel in 1974. Don Siegel was going to direct but did not like the screenplay. Wendell Mayes had written a draft, however, Mayes's script failed to gain any interest. Norman Jewison was then attached to produce and direct the film, and Abby Mann wrote a new draft, Jewison was unhappy with Mann’s screenplay, and pre-production stalled. Jewison decided to step down as director, but would stay on as executive producer, Michael Cimino was hired to write another draft and direct, with Clint Eastwood and Nick Nolte starring, but Cimino dropped out of the film in order to work on Heaven's Gate, and Jewison would hire John Irvin as director.

George Malko was then hired to write a new draft, Malko went to London and spent 2 1/2 months working on the script with Irvin and producer Larry DeWaay, after United Artists greenlit the project, Gary DeVore was hired to rewrite the script.

This was only the second international feature for director John Irvin, who had worked as a documentary maker during the Vietnam War. He went on to direct stars such as Arnold Schwarzenegger (Raw Deal), Don Cheadle (Hamburger Hill) and Michael Caine (Shiner). Cinematographer Jack Cardiff had previously directed an account of mercenaries in Africa entitled Dark of the Sun. Composer Geoffrey Burgon concludes the film with A. E. Housman's Epitaph on an Army of Mercenaries sung over the end titles.

=== Filming ===
Principal photography began on February 18, 1980. The opening Central American scene was filmed at the Miami Glider Port southwest of Miami, Florida. Later African country scenes were filmed in Belize City, Belize, and the surrounding area, since Irvin decided shooting the scenes in Africa in real-life would be too risky. The manually-turned swinging bridge shown during the attack is one of the largest of its kind in the world. Shooting also took place in New York City and in London.

=== Weapons and props ===
The film features several weapons that were prominent in popular culture during the 1980s. The Uzi submachine guns used in the film (changed from the German Second World War vintage Schmeissers of the novel) were a mix of real Uzis and set-dressed Ingram MAC-10s. Shannon's grenade launcher, depicted in the promotional poster, dubbed the "XM-18" in the film, is a Manville gun – a design later used by the MM-1 grenade launcher.

== Release ==
The Dogs of War had its world premiere at the Odeon Leicester Square in London on 17 December 1980 before opening to the public the following day.

=== Home media ===
It was released to DVD by MGM Home Video on 20 November 2001 as a Region 1 widescreen DVD and later on by Twilight Time (under license from MGM) as a multi-region Blu-ray disc.

== Reception ==
On Rotten Tomatoes, the film holds a rating of 70% from 20 reviews. Metacritic, which uses a weighted average, assigned the film a score of 56 out of 100, based on 8 critics, indicating "mixed or average" reviews.

=== Critical response ===
Vincent Canby of The New York Times wrote: "Mr. Walken is unusually convincing in a difficult, hermetic kind of role. Excellent support is given him by Tom Berenger, as another mercenary, and Colin Blakely, as an English television cameraman."

Norman Jewison wrote in his memoir This Terrible Business Has Been Good to Me:

The Dogs of War is one film I would rather have directed than produced, but I was proud to be associated with it in any capacity. It had modest success in North America but was well received in Europe, where there is more interest in African politics and a better understanding of the underside of corporate power in poor countries.
