= 4th Commando Brigade =

4th Commando Brigade may refer to:

- 4th Commando Brigade (Biafra)
- 4th Commando Brigade (Turkey)
- 4th Commando Brigade (United Kingdom)

== See also ==
- 4th Brigade (disambiguation)
