= Rolf Steiner =

German mercenary (born 1933)

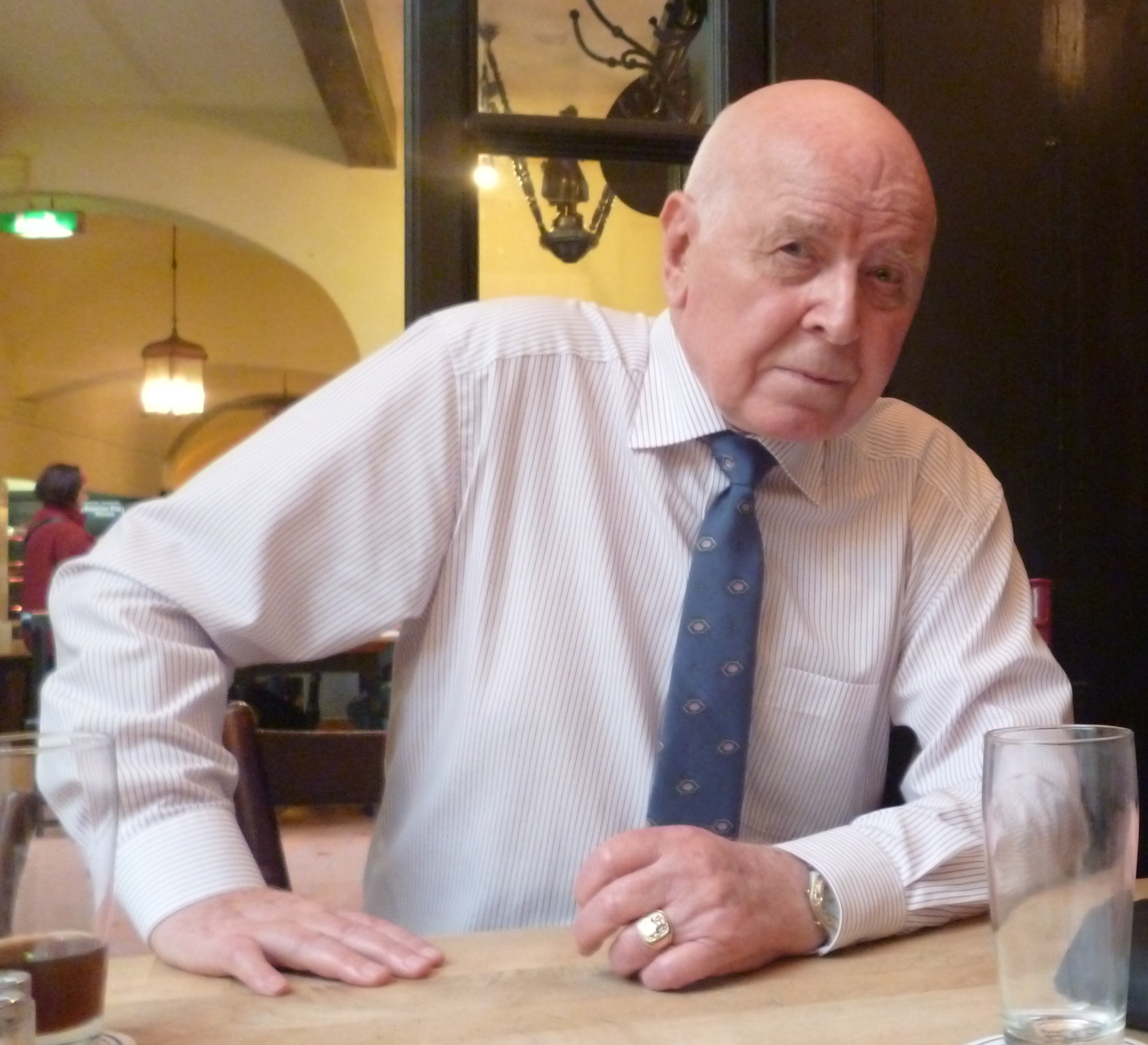
- Steiner in 2013
- Born: 3 January 1933 (age 93); Munich, Bavaria, Germany
- Military career
- Allegiance: France; Organisation armée secrète Biafra; Anyanya
- Conflicts: First Indochina War; Suez Crisis; Algerian War; Nigerian Civil War; First Sudanese Civil War

Rolf Steiner (born 3 January 1933) is a German retired mercenary. He began his military career as a French Foreign Legion paratrooper and saw combat in Vietnam, Egypt, and Algeria. Steiner rose to the rank of lieutenant colonel commanding the 4th Commando Brigade in the Biafran Army during the Nigerian Civil War, and later fought with the Anyanya rebels in southern Sudan.

== Early life ==
Rolf Steiner is the son of a Protestant father and Catholic mother. As a youth in Nazi Germany, Steiner was, according to his 1976 memoirs, a member of the Nazi Deutsches Jungvolk (German Young Folk), and he looked forward to joining the Hitlerjugend (Hitler Youth). However, the Second World War ended before he could join the Hitler Youth. Steiner later claimed to have fought as a Jungvolk volunteer in the Volkssturm militia in the final days of the Second World War, but no evidence exists to support this claim outside of his own memoirs. A 1968 article in Time stated: "In the final days of World War II, he fought as a Hitler Youth in Germany’s last-ditch defense against the advancing U.S. Army."

In a 2013 interview, Steiner called his memoirs a "fable". He stated that his father who had served in the Luftwaffe committed suicide in 1937 after failing a "racial hygiene test" as it was discovered that one of his ancestors was a Jewish woman who converted to Lutheranism in the 18th century to marry a Gentile. Steiner also stated that his mother abandoned him in 1944 when he was 11, leaving him to be brought up at a nunnery in Lower Bavaria. In the interview, Steiner described a lonely, miserable childhood as a Mischling ("half-breed") under the Third Reich and denied being a member of the Jungvolk or having fought in World War Two. Steiner maintains his teachers called him a "filthy Jew" and he was thrown into the Ganacker concentration camp in February 1945 after he was caught throwing food to the inmates.

In 1948, at the age of 16, Steiner decided to study for the priesthood. He intended to become a Catholic missionary in Africa. Following an affair with a nun at school, however, he decided that the military offered a more interesting life. When he was 17, Steiner enlisted in the French Foreign Legion at Offenburg, and was sent to Sidi Bel Abbès in Algeria. Steiner intensely wanted to be a soldier, and since the Wehrmacht had been abolished together with the German state in 1945, joining the Foreign Legion was the best way to satisfy his martial ambitions. In 2013, he claimed that he enlisted in the Foreign Legion because he was "at war with Germany" and because he had read romantic accounts of the Legion's role in the Rif War in Morocco.

== French Foreign Legion ==
As a legionnaire, Steiner fought in Vietnam. Steiner stated in his memoirs The Last Adventurer he joined the Foreign Legion because he believed in "the protection of the weak and the defense of just causes." The American journalist Ted Morgan ridiculed him for this claim, stating: "Choosing the Foreign Legion to carry out such noble goals was like becoming a loan shark in the interests of philanthropy. Stripped of its mythology, the Foreign Legion is a corps of misfits who are trained to become efficient killers. Anyone who has been on an operation with the Legionnaires knows that they are gangsters in uniform".

After completing his training in France, he boarded a ship in Marseille that took him to Vietnam and discovered many of the Germans serving in the French Foreign Legion were veterans of the Waffen-SS while many of the Eastern Europeans serving in the Legion were veterans of either the SS or the Ostlegionen. Others serving in the Legion were Poles, Hungarians, Italians and Russians, which impressed him as an example of men coming together united by a common love of war. One source stated about the Legionnaires during this period: "The Legionnaires did not sacrifice themselves for France, but for an abstract concept of honor, for vague ideas of a purposeless [non-ideological] soldiery, and for the Legion, which had meanwhile replaced homeland and family". The voyage to Vietnam took 17 days with stops at Port Said and Singapore before landing at Haiphong.

Steiner first saw action in 1951, loading a machine gun that he was forced to take over after the Hungarian operator was wounded and then bled to death. Steiner stated: "I saw four Vietnamese in sight, opened the fire and saw them fall. Nothing triggered me, that was the war... I had lost my childhood." Steiner was wounded in the leg, but described himself as enjoying the war in Vietnam, saying "the cruelties of the day, the warm evenings in the tropics, the camaraderie, the good wages of the Legion" were his "home". In Vietnam, he lost one of his lungs in circumstances that have never been satisfactorily explained. Steiner claimed to have lost one of his lungs due to a Viet Minh bullet at the Battle of Dien Bien Phu in 1954, but the British journalist Frederick Forsyth denied this claim, stating that Steiner's lung was removed by doctors after he was infected with tuberculosis in 1959. In an interview with the German journalist Ulii Kulke, Steiner denied having fought at Dien Bien Phu, saying he was with the Legion's garrison in Hanoi at the time. However, Steiner expressed much regret that he did not fight in the legendary Battle of Dien Bien Phu where the French paratroopers and Foreign Legionaries fought ferociously against overwhelming odds for four months, saying he would have very much enjoyed the carnage of Dien Bien Phu. During his time in the Legion, Steiner was twice demoted down from sergeant to private for insubordination, and twice promoted back up.

Having first served in the 1st Foreign Parachute Battalion (1e BEP) in northern Vietnam against the Viet Minh, he was in the detachment that parachuted into Suez in the 1956 Suez Crisis. He was later posted to Algeria where he met his future wife Odette, a Pied-Noir. The Legion hardened Steiner, and he was taken by the bravery, the loyalty and the cosmopolitanism of the Legion, a collection of men from all round the world who despite being adversaries only a few years before, were now steadfast comrades. Steiner spent five years from 1956 to 1961 fighting in Algeria. The British journalist John St. Jorre described Steiner as a "first-class soldier" with an outstanding record in both Vietnam and Algeria. In his letters to the British journalist Peter Martell, Steiner always ended them by quoting the Legion's motto Legio Patria Nostra ("The Legion is our fatherland"). Steiner was promoted up from a private to sergeant.

While fighting the FLN (Front de Libération Nationale) uprising in Algeria, Steiner became active in the anti-De Gaulle Organisation armée secrète (OAS) through his wife. Many in the Foreign Legion came to intensely identify with the pied-noirs of Algeria, and when the French President Charles de Gaulle proposed independence for Algeria, a number of Foreign Legionnaires became involved in the OAS, which attempted to overthrow de Gaulle. In 1961, Steiner took part in the attempted military coup d'état against de Gaulle.

Steiner joined the OAS less because of politics because of "a spirit of camaraderie". As an OAS operative, Steiner specialized in setting off plastic bombs as part of the terrorist campaign to overthrow de Gaulle. He was eventually arrested, sentenced to nine months in prison, and then released into civilian life. Being discharged from the Legion left Steiner immensely bored with life as by his own admission he was only suitable for a military life and he found civilian life unbearably dull. In 1962, de Gaulle pardoned all Frenchmen for any war crimes committed in Algeria while also pardoning most of those involved in the OAS as a part of the process of national reconciliation. Steiner lived in France working at an aircraft factory.

== Biafra ==
In 1967, while living in Paris, he made contact with former colleague Roger Faulques, who was organizing a mercenary unit for the newly independent Republic of Biafra. France supported Biafra, which possessed much of Nigeria's oil and had the capacity to produce 1 million barrels of oil per day. By 1967 estimates, Biafra possessed oil reserves equal to about one-third of Kuwait's. French President Charles de Gaulle believed that backing Biafra's secession from Nigeria would result in the French oil companies receiving the concessions to pump Biafra's oil. The French secret service, the Service de Documentation Extérieure et de Contre-Espionnage was sponsoring mercenaries to fight for Biafra, and Steiner was one of the mercenaries recruited. French documents declassified in 2017 confirmed what had long been suspected; the recruitment of mercenaries such as Steiner to fight for Biafra, together with the supply of arms, were orchestrated by the "Africa cell" within the French government headed by the controversial French civil servant Jacques Foccart. The air field at Uli became “Africa’s busiest airport” as French arms were flown in from Libreville, Gabon. Gabon, a former French colony and a member of Françafrique had under French instructions recognized Biafra. French arms were shipped to Libreville and from there were flown into Uli. Besides France, Biafra's main foreign supporter was South Africa as the apartheid government wanted to see the failure of oil-rich Nigeria, which was viewed as pro-British and pro-Soviet

Steiner flew to Port Harcourt via Lisbon, Portugal and Libreville and enlisted into the Biafran army. Faulques and most of his 53 mercenaries soon left Biafra after leading his men in an unauthorized attack to retake the city of Calabar, which ended in disaster in October 1967. Steiner was one of the few who chose to stay on, becoming their leader due to his seniority as a former sergeant in the French Foreign Legion. Faulques and most of the mercenaries he had recruited had expected a repeat of the Congo crisis when they had, with the exception of the Irish, encountered undisciplined and poorly trained Swedish and Indian United Nations peacekeepers. The discovery that the Nigerians were more disciplined than the Congolese led most of the mercenaries to depart Biafra as the possibility that they might be killed was too unnerving for them. Furthermore, prisoners were rarely taken in the Nigerian Civil War, and the Nigerian Federal Army especially hated the white mercenaries who were seen as outsiders who had come to break up Nigeria. As late as 2012, the Nigerian author Ayuba Mshelia called Steiner and the rest of the white mercenaries some of the "most hated and hideous mercenaries on this planet".

British historian Peter Baxter wrote that white mercenaries had an over-sized impact during the Congo crisis of 1960-65 mostly because the Congolese Army had almost disintegrated, and the badly trained Congolese militias were outclassed by the mercenaries. It was hoped that white mercenaries would have a similar impact in Nigeria. However, Baxter notes that while much of the Nigerian Army's leadership had been killed in two coups in 1966, there was still a sufficient number of Sandhurst-trained Nigerian Army officers left to provide just enough professional leadership to hold the Nigerian Army together. These Sandhurst-trained Nigerian officers were of "altogether higher caliber" than the Congolese militia leaders, and generally speaking, the Nigerians tended to get the better of the mercenaries.

Steiner's first project upon arriving in 1967 was an attempt to create a brown water navy for Biafra by converting some river boats into gun boats. Steiner argued that with Biafra being flanked on three side by rivers, most notably the natural defensive barrier of the great Niger River, that controlling the riparian waters was essential. The Federal Nigerian Navy was very small, but the naval blockade imposed by one frigate and eight patrol boats had created major problems for Biafra, preventing arms and food from being imported and oil from being exported. Together with the Italian mercenary Giorgio Norbiato, a former Marine Commando with the Italian Navy, Steiner converted three Chris-Craft Boats from the Port Harcourt Sailing Club into makeshift gunboats. The newly founded Biafran Navy was successful in launching surprise night raids along the rivers, which brought in much-needed weapons and ammunition. However, the three gunboats were unable to break the naval blockade or stop the Nigerian Army from crossing the rivers. Though the war was primarily fought on land, it was Nigerian control of the sea and the air that determined the outcome of the war, as the Nigerians decided to starve Biafra into submission. Biafra's population vastly exceeded the supply of locally grown food, requiring that food be imported, and the Nigerian blockade led to a famine that killed between 2-3 million people. It was the famine that ultimately caused Biafra's defeat in 1970.

Following his partial naval success, Steiner had some success in leading small units into action against the Nigerian Federal Army. David M. Bane, the American ambassador in Libreville reported to Washington on 12 November 1968: "Rolf Steiner, Taffy Williams and an unnamed Italian then became military advisors to Ojukwu. At the end of April 1968, Steiner and the Italian were each given command of a battalion of Biafran commandos with 400 to 500 men per battalion".

Steiner was given the command 4th Biafran Commando Brigade, composed of 3,000 men, as a lieutenant colonel. The 4th Commando Brigade was intended for irregular operations and existed outside of the regular chain of command in the Biafran Army at the time of its creation. The notional first three Commando brigades did not exist; the Biafran army created this bit of disinformation to confuse the Nigerian Federal forces. The 4th Brigade was also known as the "S" brigade as it was intended for special tasks. Steiner chose a skull and crossbones as his regimental symbol, which he thought would constantly remind his troops of the risks inherent to war rather than any reference to the pirates' Jolly Roger or the Nazi SS, and adopted the slogan "Long Live Death! Long Live War!" Steiner found the Biafrans to be quick learners and highly motivated, and the 4th Commando Brigade saw themselves as an elite force and were proud of their skull and crossbones symbol.

Steiner's subordinates were a mixture of adventurers consisting of the Italian Giorgio Norbiato; the Rhodesian explosive expert Johnny Erasmus; the Welshman Taffy Williams; the Scotsman Alexander "Alec" Gay; the Irishman Louis "Paddy" Malrooney; the Corsican Armand Iaranelli who had been able to enlist in the Foreign Legion by pretending to be Italian; and a Jamaican bartender turned mercenary who called himself "Johnny Korea". Norbiato, Erasmus, and Gay had all previously served as mercenaries fighting for Katanga in the Congo. Of Steiner's subordinates, Williams was known for his short temper and was considered to be "bullet proof" owing to his ability to survive multiple wounds. Malrooney was noted for his courage under fire, for the utterly ruthless way he fought the war, and a tendency to walk around with a gun in one hand and a bottle of wine in the other. Erasmus was highly skilled in rigging up makeshift explosive devices that hindered the Nigerian advance and loved to blow up buildings and bridges. Iaranelli was known for his steely determination to keep fighting despite the way he kept losing parts of his body. In Biafra, Iaranelli was called "Armand the Brave", a man who fought despite his missing body parts and the fragments of bullets and shells lodged in his body. Finally the heavily armed, belligerent Gay, a veteran of the Paratroop Regiment who spoke with a thick working-class Glasgow accent always carried around a shotgun, a Madsen sub-machine gun and a FN rifle "just in case I have to shoot my way out of this bloody place". Gay professed his belief in the Celtic notion of the magical "little people" who really controlled the world, saying in dead seriousness that the "little people" will "jam your machine gun and cause your rockets to misfire" if one angered them. Gay ultimately left Biafra after being wounded four times over the course of six days.

The brigade was divided into the Ahoada Strike Force led by Iaranelli, the Abaliki Strike Force led by Erasmus and the Guards Strike Force led by Williams. What Steiner called Strike Forces were actually battalions, but he preferred the term Strike Force as it sounded better. The 4th Brigade spent the first three months of 1968 operating behind the lines of the Federal Nigerian Army. Steiner had wanted to conduct irregular operations, but the need to defend the oil wells of Biafra led him and his men being assigned a much more conventional role after March 1968.

The 3rd Nigerian Division held the lines just beyond Onitsha, which the Nigerians had taken in March 1968. Onitsha had been taken by the 2nd Nigerian Division under the command of General Murtala Mohammed, a victory that the Biafrans were completely unprepared for and left a dangerous wedge into their lines, but that Mohammed chose not to exploit. Initially, the 4th Commando Brigade stayed along the front at Onitsha, where they succeeded in halting the Nigerians, but in July 1968 the brigade was moved to the Owerri sector. The hope was that the brigade would serve as a wedge that would hinder the Nigerian advance along a front extending from Owerri to Port Harcourt. By this time, the 4th Brigade were serving as shock troops being assigned wherever the Nigerian pressure was at its most intense. Steiner's Italian colleague Norbiato was killed in action while leading a raid intended to slow down the Nigerians. The British journalist Frederick Forsyth in his 1969 book The Biafra Story devoted an entire chapter to covering the exploits of Steiner and the 4th Brigade in 1968.

In August 1968, the 4th Commando Brigade was involved in extremely heavy fighting as it attempted to stop the 3rd Nigerian Marine Commando Division under the command of General Benjamin "Black Scorpion" Adekunle from crossing the Imo River as the Nigerians followed up their capture of Port Harcourt, the center of the oil industry. By this stage in the conflict, the 4th Commando Brigade consisted of only about 1, 000 men, some of whom had to capture ammunition on the battlefield to arm themselves. In September 1968, the 4th Brigade attempted to hold the town of Aba, but was forced to retreat after running out of ammunition. In October 1968, the Nigerians launched an offensive intended to take the Biafran capital of Umuahia with the aim of finishing the war, but in the course of heavy fighting, the 4th Brigade played a prominent role in halting the Nigerian offensive. The fighting during Operation OAU was the most intense of the entire war, and ended with the Biafrans retaking Owerri. General Adekunle was over-confident owing to his massive ego and he insisted on having the 3rd Marine Commando Division operate alone because he wanted the glory of taking Umuahia to be all his. However, Steiner and the 4th Commando Brigade put up a very stubborn defense that finally shattered the 3rd Marine Division. Steiner started to press for the Biafrans to launch an offensive to seize Lagos, the largest city in Nigeria, in a plan that was widely considered to be insane as Lagos was too far away from the front. With the plan to take Lagos rejected, Steiner pressed for an offensive to retake Calabar. Instead, Steiner and the 4th Commando Brigade were assigned just outside of Onitsha in a defensive role as heavy Biafran losses were making any offensives increasingly impossible and the Biafran president General C. Odumegwu Ojukwu was concerned that the Nigerians might take his ancestral hometown of Nnewi.

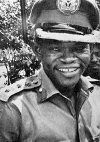
"Black Scorpion" Adekunle of the 3rd Nigerian Marine Commando Division was Steiner's opponent for much of 1968

The South African journalist A. J Venter described Steiner as "a ruthless, demanding taskmaster" who was very "hard" on his troops, and was respected but not loved by the men under his command. Steiner revelled in the war and was well known for his eccentricities, such as pulling out his Browning Hi-Power handgun and firing into the air whenever he wanted people to pay attention to him. Venter also wrote that Steiner was an "austere, engaging" man who quickly became a favorite of the journalists covering the war who found the flamboyant, eccentric mercenary a good news story. A photograph taken in 1968 by the Italian journalist Romano Cagnoni of Steiner in a stern, martial pose dressed in a uniform of his own design made headlines all around the world. A 1968 article in Time quoted Steiner as saying about his opponents: "If any corporal serving under me in the Legion had taken more than a week to conquer West Africa with their kind of equipment, I’d have him shot for dereliction of duty." Steiner was noted for his rants, in which he always held the Foreign Legion as the model of military excellence to which the 4th Commando Brigade was not meeting, once saying "You are not Legionaries, you are not men". The fact that Steiner usually spoke either in his native German or French limited the impact of his rants, as his Igbo-speaking soldiers did not understand what he was saying, causing him to finally switch over to English. Steiner was also known for arbitrarily demoting and promoting men up the ranks, though he was considered to be a good judge of talent by promoting capable men to provide leadership at the tactical level. When Steiner promoted one Igbo soldier to captain, there were complaints that it was not acceptable to have a man who did not know how to use cutlery and who ate food with his fingers eating in the officers' mess; Steiner replied that he did not care if he ate with his feet as long as he was a good officer.

According to Chinua Achebe, and contrary to the perceptions of a mercenary, Steiner fought for the Biafrans without pay and served long after most other European soldiers of fortune had left the cause. Steiner claimed to have fought for Biafra for idealistic reasons, saying the Igbo people were the victims of genocide, but the American journalist Ted Morgan mocked his claims, describing Steiner as a militarist who simply craved war because killing was the only thing he knew how to do well. Morgan wrote in his review of Steiner's memoirs The Last Adventurer:

"Mr. Steiner never saw beyond the battlefield, and it did not really matter which battlefield. Scratch the veneer of just causes and you will find a war‐lover. Money was not important, but the life style was. In civilian life, he was a nobody. In combat, he was an expert. Fighting was the one thing he knew how to do well. He felt comfortable in violent situations. He enjoyed strutting around in fatigues, and leading his Biafran commandos into battle. Where else could he get the rush of adrenaline only combat brings? Where else could a sergeant be promoted overnight to colonel? Although it is not intended as such, his account of how he single‐handedly prevented a Biafran collapse should be read as a great piece of comic writing, in the manner of Evelyn Waugh."

One of Steiner's former colleagues called him "a self-appointed Messiah" who in his own mind was fighting for the oppressed peoples of Africa, noting that Steiner liked to denounce the other mercenaries who fought only for money as the "scum of the earth". Martell wrote about him: "Too wild to conform to the rigid authority of a formal army, he found comfort in violence, and meaning in the adrenaline of battle and the regularity of uniform". The Time article from 1968 stated: "Steiner likes beer, Benson & Hedges cigarettes, violence and very little else. Compulsively clean, he throws even slightly dusty plates at his mess waiters, then kicks them to drive the point home...The troops do not seem to mind the harshness of the command; they follow Steiner because they believe he is a winner and because he has juju (good luck)." The same article noted:

"The mercenaries’ salaries run from $1,700 a month upward. But payday is at best a sporadic affair in besieged Biafra. In any case, money is probably not the major reason for their presence. It is not the land, either, for they seem to have no eyes for the green rolling infinity of the African bush, the visionary sunsets, the humming, warm, smoky nights. They are lobos, outcasts from society who fight every day in order to taste the excitement that comes in living close to violent death. If they survive Biafra, they will doubtless drift on in search of another war."

One Yoruba who fought for Biafra, Fola Oyewole, recalled that most Biafran officers "...loathed Steiner for his pompous attitude and his lack of manners". Oyewole remembered Steiner as saying to a Biafran colonel "You general in Biafra, in France a corporal!" Steiner's unwillingness to take orders from any Biafran officer, together with the fact that the highest rank he held in the French Foreign Legion was sergeant, made him widely disliked by the Biafrans. Steiner insisted on giving his commands in "Legionarie French" (a very simplified French used in the Legion), though the British journalist John St. Jorre described Steiner's English as "quite competent". Due to Nigeria being a former British colony, English was widely spoken in both Nigeria and Biafra, and Steiner's insistence on French as the language of command provoked resentment from the Biafran officers, who saw his choice of language as a way to avoid talking to them. Oyewole stated the original purpose of 4th Commando Brigade was to conduct irregular operations behind the Nigerian lines, and that the decision by the Bifaran leader C. Odumegwu Ojukwu to employ the brigade as a regular unit was unwise recalling one mercenary as saying to him "Steiner was a very good commander when he had about 100 exceptionally brave fighters". Finally, Oyewole stated the white mercenaries were hated by the ordinary people of Biafra due to their high-handed behavior; a tendency to retreat when it appeared possible the Nigerians were about to cut them off instead of holding their ground; and a fondness for looting, noting that the European mercenaries seemed more interested in stealing as much as possible instead of helping Biafra.

On 15 November 1968 Steiner ordered Operation Hiroshima with the aim of retaking Onitsha and stopping the Nigerian advance. Baxter wrote that Steiner "ordered a surprisingly ill-conceived full frontal assault against Nigerian positions across an open area without artillery, air or fire support". Adekunle had his men dug-in with fortified machine gun posts and the Nigerians decisively stopped the Biafran offensive. The Belgian mercenary Marc Goosens was killed together with most of his men in a suicidal attack against a well dug Nigerian position. By the time the offensive was abandoned on 29 November 1968, over half of the 4th Commando Brigade had been killed. After the failure of Operation Hiroshima, Steiner lapsed into a depressive state and heavy drinking, becoming paranoid as he feared that his own men were planning to kill him. In an assessment, Forsyth wrote of Steiner: "He was good once, but deteriorated. The press publicity got to him and that's always bad for a mercenary".

On 6 December 1968, Steiner was ordered to present himself before Ojukwu and explain his failure. Steiner showed up very drunk and belligerent. He ordered a glass of beer and became extremely angry when he found the beer was warm, smashing his glass as he maintained that he deserved cold beer. When Ojukwu refused, Steiner attempted to slap him across the face, leading to a brawl with Ojukwu's bodyguards. Only Ojukwu saved Steiner from being shot on the spot, and the meeting ended with Ojukwu stripping him of command and Steiner being marched out in handcuffs. Following several confrontations with his Biafran colleagues, Steiner resigned from service, and was arrested. On 10 December 1968, Steiner was expelled from Biafra. On 15 December 1968, Maurice Delauney, the French ambassador to Gabon, reported to Paris: "After departure of Rolf Steiner and his comrades, there are only three European combatants with the Biafrans, two French and one English". Oyewole wrote: "Steiner's departure from Biafra removed the shine from the white mercenaries, the myth of the white man's superiority in the art of soldiering". His departure was greeted with much relief by the Biafran officers. After the war, Philip Effiong, the chief of the Biafran general staff was asked by a journalist about the impact of the white mercenaries on the war, his reply was: "They had not helped. It would had made no difference if not a single one of them came to work for the secessionist forces. Rolf Steiner stayed the longest. He was more of a bad influence than anything else. We were happy to get rid of him".

Historians are divided on Steiner's overall effectiveness as a military leader. The Indian historian Pradeep Baru wrote that the 4th Commando Brigade, under Steiner's leadership, had a "poor operational record" and by late 1968 several Biafran officers felt that Steiner was more of a liability than an asset for Biafra. One Nigerian historian, Balarabe Usman Yousef, said of Steiner and his "S" brigade that "Some people think the "S" stands for 'strike', but I like to think that it stands for 'stupid'!" The British historian Philip Jowett wrote that operations under Steiner's command proved "extremely costly" as the 4th Commando Brigade took very heavy losses in all its operations. Jowett also wrote that Steiner was over-confident and became "delusional" in his self-assessment of his abilities. Most notably he felt that he need not take orders from the staff of Ojukwu, causing much tension over the rogue commander. By contrast, the British historian Peter Baxter called the 4th Commando Brigade the "best unit in the [Biafran] army" and under Steiner's leadership was "well commanded and tactically sound" on an operational level.

== Sudan ==
Following his return to Europe, Steiner learned through his contacts in charitable foundations of the plight of Christians and the Anyanya rebel forces in southern Sudan (now South Sudan). Cut off from the north by what the local people called the "grass curtain" (a reference to the vast grass fields of the region), the people of southern Sudan felt their region was ignored and isolated, and that most people around the world neither knew nor cared about their existence. In order to tie up Sudanese military forces from being sent to aid Egypt, which was engaged in the War of Attrition along the Suez Canal, Israel dispatched a military mission in May 1969 commanded by David Ben-Uziel, nicknamed "Tarzan", to supply arms to Anyanya rebel forces. The Ugandan government also acted as a de facto supporter of the rebels, offering weapons and support in exchange for cut of the profits from the lucrative ivory trade smuggling networks that stretched from Africa to Asia, with ivory serving as one of the few domestic resources the Anyanya could leverage. Steiner offered his services to Idi Amin, then commander of the Ugandan Army, and arrived in the Sudan in July 1969 where he started by supervising the building of an airfield to fly in arms.

Steiner described southern Sudan as a place where the people were almost living in the Stone Age, writing the people had nothing: "not even the most ordinary objects which seem to have invaded the planet - not a plastic bucket, a box of matches, a nylon shirt, or even a bottle of Coca-Cola. Nine-tenths of the people went naked. They lived like animals. The women didn't even have pots to cook in. Instead the men hammered bits of sheet metal into usable shapes". The south of the Sudan operated on a barter economy and for the peoples of the region, whether they be Dinka or Nuer, the principal currency were and still are cattle. The principal means of acquiring wealth in southern Sudan had been millennia of cattle raids, regarded as an honorable and noble way to acquire wealth. The lack of cash to pay for weapons was a persistent problem for the Anyanya, which was rectified by slaughtering elephants and selling their tusks on the international black markets.

By August 1969, Steiner was associated with Anyanya General Emilio Tafeng and was encouraging Tafeng's ambitions to make himself the leader of Anyanya. In the same month, Steiner planted a story in the Ugandan newspapers that a revolution had brought down the nominally in-control Anyanya government, the Nile Provisional Government, and that the people were rallying to Tafeng. In November 1969, Steiner definitely attached himself to the faction led by General Emilio Tafeng who he was serving as a military adviser. Tafeng awarded Steiner a commission as a colonel, commanding an estimated 20,000-24, 000 men. By 1969, the unity of the Anyanya rebels had descended into factional infighting and resulted in Tafeng breaking away from the Nile Provisional Government to form the Anyidi Revolutionary Government. The split was in part caused by Steiner, who promised Tafeng "that if he could keep away from the Nile Provisional Government...the German government had agreed to supply him with arms so that he could fight separately against the Arabs". Steiner suggested to Tafeng that arms could be smuggled into the Sudan via Uganda under the guise of humanitarian aid, saying it would be easy to hide arms and ammunition among the blankets, medical supplies and agricultural implements. Steiner further suggested that Tafeng should overthrow Nile Provisional Government President Gordon Muortat and, once Tafeng was in charge, appoint Steiner chief of staff of Anyanya.

An American documentary filmmaker Allan Reed found Steiner in 1970 and recalled: "He wanted to be king. We found him sitting on the ground in this little hut, and he was patching up some infected wounds that some kids had, there was a whole long line of them. He said the only time he was ever happy was when he went into battle. His eyes lit up when he talked about it. He told me that he thinks of himself as a 17th century man. It seemed to me that he was there building himself a little kingdom". Reed stated that Steiner claimed that he was working for MI6 and the Central Intelligence Agency, but Reed was skeptical, saying: "He didn't deliver any goods. Any major Western intelligence agency could at least get him some machine guns or munitions...It was really quite strange. It was quite a pathetic looking place". The locals told Reed that the previous year Steiner had ordered them to build an airfield, saying that "plane loads of arms and relief aid" from the West would then be flown in. Of the airfield that had been built in 1969, Reed stated: "So the people chopped down the trees and built a grass runway. It was completely overrun with weeds. The people said that no planes had ever come". Steiner was noted for his eccentric training and leadership methods such as firing his gun near the feet of sentries he caught sleeping at night, making recruits ride leap swings through fires, and making trainees sit in a circle with their feet facing a mortar tube while he fired a round. The people of the southern Sudan remembered Steiner as a strange and terrifying character, but he believed he was acting in their best interest, telling one journalist in 1970: "I'm an extremist. The Africans need my help". Martell wrote about Steiner: "He was addicted to the thrill of combat-or at least to bask in the reputation of that. Coupled with a love of guns and an arrogant political naivety that he could make a change, it was a dangerous mix".

Steiner began to train Tafeng's men at his base in Morta and led a "daring attack" on the Sudanese Army post at Kajo Keji. The attack proved a disaster, as the small arms fire of the guerrillas was no match for the heavy machine guns and mortars of the Sudanese. After this defeat, Steiner went to West Germany where he contacted Catholic charity the Biafra-Sudan Action Committee, in an attempt to raise awareness in the West about the plight of the southern Sudanese. Upon his return to Sudan, Tafeng gave him a bodyguard of about 800 men, believing that Steiner would deliver upon his promises of aid.

The period from late 1969 through early 1970 was characterized by heavy fighting as the new Sudanese president, General Gaafar Nimeiry, who just overthrown the previous government in May 1969, ordered an offensive to retake southern Sudan. The offensive cornered the Anyidi Revolutionary Government between forces of the Nile Provisional Government and another faction, loyal to Colonel Joseph Lagu who like Tafeng wanted to overthrow Muortat, and resulted in the collapse of Tafeng's faction in April 1970. Tafeng made a bargain where he disbanded his government and recognized the authority of Lagu, who was hostile towards Steiner. Nimeiry's offensive resumed in September 1970 with several Anyanya camps, including the camp at Morta where Steiner had been based, taken by the Sudanese Army. By October Israel had singled out Lagu as the most able of the Anyanya leaders and conveyed that they felt Steiner was a "loose cannon" and objected to a man who spent his youth in the Deutsches Jungvolk. Israeli agent, David Ben-Uziel remarked: "I told Lagu either Steiner leaves or we get out". In November 1970, Steiner decided to return to Europe and departed for Kampala, Uganda where he was promptly arrested as part of a power struggle between Amin and President Milton Obote. When he refused to implicate his benefactor Amin in treason, Obote had him arrested and flown to Khartoum on 8 January 1971, charged with "crimes against Africa."

On 18 January 1971, Steiner appeared at a press conference in Khartoum, where he admitted that he worked as a mercenary, but denied having fought for Anyanya, saying he only served the Anyidi Revolutionary Government. Steiner's trial in Khartoum lasted from 5 August until 9 September 1971 and attracted much international publicity, not the least because of Steiner's tendency to give rambling speeches before the court and to make bizarre claims. The Muslim Arab government in Khartoum maintained that the Christian blacks of south Sudan had no grievances, and the rebellion was merely the work of outsiders stirring the southerners up, with the trial proving a great propaganda tool for the Nimeiry regime. Ignoring the fact that rebellion had started long before Steiner had arrived in 1969, the Nimeiry regime vastly exaggerated Steiner's role in the war and portrayed him as the mastermind behind the rebellion who had duped gullible Africans into fighting against Khartoum.

Steiner was convicted and spent three years in prison, where he was severely tortured and was eventually sentenced to death by the Sudanese courts, which then commuted the sentence to twenty years on "humanitarian" grounds. Venter observed that had Steiner not been from the West, it was almost certain that the death sentence would have been executed. Ben-Uziel expressed regret to Martell that he had pressured Lagu to expel Steiner, saying: "If I had known he would had been tortured like this, I would not had let it happen. What is the point to torture this person? He did nothing bad". During his time in Khartoum, he was the subject of an East German documentary Immer wenn der Steiner kam. Steiner has denied that the East German filmmakers tortured him, saying that they got him to talk by supplying him with beer (a rarity in the Sudan, which enforces sharia law and bans alcohol). It was only through pressure from the West German government that he was finally released from prison in March 1974. As a result of imprisonment and torture in Khartoum, Steiner lost one kidney together with 30% of his vision in both eyes.

The British historian Edgar O'Ballance wrote: "Steiner had hardly made any impression in the south, which in general seemed embarrassed by his former presence there, but in view of his experience, some of his comments on this semi-secret war are of interest". Steiner gave his own assessment of the Anyanya guerrillas, saying they fought well against each other, but less well against the Sudanese Army. He described Anyanya as riven by factionalism, personality conflicts and an inability to co-ordinate the political and military aspects of the war. He also stated Anyanya had much difficulty overcoming ethnic conflicts as the guerrillas disliked fighting outside of their home regions and that he had prepared several ambushes of the Sudanese that failed when one or more of the "resistance platoons" failed to co-ordinate or even to show up at all. Steiner called the Anyanya guerrillas "cowardly".

== Later life ==
Steiner retired to Germany where he remarried and dictated his memoirs to his ghost-writer Yves-Guy Berges, which were published in 1976 in French as La Carré rouge and as The Last Adventurer in English in 1978. In 1976, the East German documentary Immer wenn der Steiner kam featuring interviews with Steiner in Khartoum prison was released, which sought to portray him as the puppet of Western oil companies. Steiner later commented that the joke was on the filmmakers behind Immer wenn der Steiner kam as in fact Western oil companies had signed concessions to pump oil in what is now South Sudan with the Khartoum regime, and the oil companies wanted nothing to do with Anyanya. In 1976, Steiner tried to sue the government of the Sudan for torturing him to sum of 12 million deutschmarks, but his lawsuit was thrown out by a Cologne court. Much of Steiner's notoriety seemed to stem from confusion in the public mind with another German mercenary, Siegfried "Congo Killer" Müller, a Wehrmacht veteran who always wore an Iron Cross around his neck and was notorious in the Congo for his brutality towards blacks.

In 1977 and 1978, Steiner visited East Germany to contact the East German officials who interviewed him in Khartoum, though to what purpose remains unclear, but in 1978 the Stasi (East German secret police) stated there was to be no more contact with him. General Idi Amin became president of Uganda after deposing Milton Obote in a coup d'état on 25 January 1971, attracting worldwide notoriety during his time for power between 1971 and 1979 for his cruelty and for ruining Uganda. As someone who knew Amin personally, Steiner became something of a celebrity in the beerhalls of Munich where he would recount tales of meeting Amin, and in the process he became a friend of the journalist, collector of Nazi memorabilia and fraudster Gerd Heidemann, who in his turn became internationally infamous in 1983 as one of the authors of the Hitler diaries hoax.

Forsyth has admitted the character of Kurt Semmler in his 1974 novel The Dogs of War, a crazed German mercenary who dies in the Sudan, was based on Steiner. In June 1982, Steiner was involved in a lawsuit in Munich as the government of the Federal Republic attempted to bill him for the cost of flying him out of Khartoum, leading him to claim that he had not wanted to leave the Sudan. In 2013, he was living in Munich and was described by the journalist Ulli Kulke as haunting the beerhalls, where he maintained a belligerent attitude, still insisting that he was idealist who fought only to protect the peoples of Africa. In an interview with the British journalist Peter Martell, Steiner called The Last Adventurer a "fable" written by his ghost writer Yves-Guy Berges. In the same interview, Steiner denied being a mercenary, saying: "I was no mercenary. That is a lie. What I did, I did for the people. It was not for money, it was for the cause". Steiner rejects the label of soldier of fortune, saying he had been defamed as he maintained: "When a man fights for what he truly believes, he is not a mercenary".

== In fiction ==
Frederick Forsyth's popular novel about mercenaries, The Dogs of War, makes reference to Steiner among other notable mercenary commanders of the 1960s and 1970s. The supporting character Kurt Semmler—likewise a German veteran of the Foreign Legion turned mercenary in Biafra and Sudan—is loosely based on Steiner.

== See also ==
- Biafra
- First Sudanese Civil War
- Taffy Williams

== Sources ==
- Barua, Pradeep (2013). The Military Effectiveness of Post-Colonial States. Leiden: Brill. ISBN 978-9004249110..
- Baxter, Peter (2014). Biafra: The Nigerian Civil War 1967-1970. London: Helion and Company. ISBN 978-1909982369.
- Collins, Robert (2005). Civil Wars and Revolution in the Sudan: Essays on the Sudan, Southern Sudan and Darfur, 1962 - 2004. Los Angeles: Tsehai Publishers. ISBN 0974819875.
- Deckert, Roman; Eberspächer, Cord; Wiechmann, Gerhard (2007). "Der Dokumentarfilm als Waffe im Kalten Krieg: „Der lachende Mann. Bekenntnisse eines Mörders" und „Immer wenn der Steiner kam". Sternstunden des Films oder demagogische Demontage?". In Lars Karl (ed.). Leinwand zwischen Tauwetter und Frost. Der osteuropäische Spiel- und Dokumentarfilm im Kalten Krieg. Berlin: Metropol Verlag. pp. 171–202. ISBN 978-3-938690-54-3.
- Jowett, Philip (2016). Modern African Wars (5): The Nigerian-Biafran War 1967–70. London: Osprey. ISBN 978-1472816108.
- Martell, Peter (2019). First Raise a Flag: How South Sudan Won the Longest War but Lost the Peace. Oxford: Oxford University Press. ISBN 978-0190083373.
- Mshelia, Ayuba (2012). Araba Let's Separate: The Story of the Nigerian Civil War. Bloomington: AuthorHouse. ISBN 978-1468529722.
- Nyaba, Adwok (2019). South Sudan: Elites, Ethnicity, Endless Wars and the Stunted State. Dar es Salaam: Mkuki na Nyota Publishers. ISBN 9789987083879.
- Nyeko-Jones, Jennifer (2011). The Silent Sunset: A Daughter's Memoir. Milton Keynes: AuthorHouse. ISBN 978-1456788964..
- Poggo, Scopas (2008). The First Sudanese Civil War: Africans, Arabs, and Israelis in the Southern Sudan, 1955-1972. New York: Springer. ISBN 978-0230617988..
- Steiner, Rolf Steiner, with the collaboration of Yves-Guy Berges (1978). The last adventurer. Translated by Cox, Steve. Boston: Little, Brown. ISBN 9780316812399. OCLC 3543208.
- O'Ballance, Edgar (2003). Sudan, Civil War and Terrorism, 1956-99. New York: Springer. ISBN 0230597327.
- Oyewole, Fola (1975). "Scientists and Mercenaries". Transition. 48 (48): 59–65. doi:10.2307/2935065. JSTOR 2935065..
- St. Jorre, John De (1972). The Brother's War: Biafra and Nigeria. New York: Houghton Mifflin Company. ISBN 0395139341.
- Venter, A.J. (2006). War Dog: Fighting Other People's Wars: The Modern Mercenary in Combat. New Delhi: Lancer. ISBN 8170621747..
- Venter, A.J. (2016). Biafra's War 1967-1970: A Tribal Conflict in Nigeria That Left a Million Dead. Warwick: Helion and Company. ISBN 978-1912174317..
