= Manville gun =

1935 semi-automatic revolver

The Manville gun was a stockless, semi-automatic, revolver type gun, introduced in 1935 by Charles J. Manville. The Manville Gun was a large weapon, with a heavy cylinder being rotated for each shot by a clockwork-type spring. The spring was wound manually during the reloading.

By 1938 Manville had introduced three different bore diameter versions of the gun, based on 12-gauge, 25-mm, or 37-mm shells. Due to poor sales, Manville guns ceased production in 1943.

== Manville 12-Bore Gun ==
The original, 1935, steel-and-aluminum weapon held twenty-four rounds of 12-gauge × 2.75-inch (18.5×70mmR) shells in a spring-driven rotary-cylinder that had to be wound counter-clockwise before firing. It consisted of a steel barrel of 11.1 inches (280 mm), a rotating aluminum-alloy ammo cylinder, a single-piece steel body and foregrip, and wooden pistol grips.

Loading and unloading were effected by unscrewing two thick, large-headed knobbed screws at the top of the weapon's cylinder that allowed the disassembly of the weapon into two halves. The forend and cylinder were the front half and the pistol-grip and cylinder backplate were the back half.

The weapon's striker was engaged by rotating and then pushing in a knob at the back of the pistol grip (reversed to disengage it—rendering it safe). Each cylinder in the weapon had its own firing pin assembly. When the trigger is pulled the striker is cocked; when the trigger "breaks", the striker is released and hits the firing pin, firing the shell.

== 25mm Manville Machine-Projector ==
In 1936, Manville introduced a version that held eighteen rounds of 25mm (1-inch) bore shells. This design fired 25mm flare, smoke, and riot gas shells. Explosive shells were not available and the cylinder walls are too thin for shot-shells. The weapon is similar to the earlier 12-gauge version, except the barrel was either 9.5 inches (240 mm) or 9.75 inches (248 mm), and used hard rubber rear grips instead of wood.

The First Model 25mm was a larger-bore version of the 12-gauge shotgun, using the same two securing screws.

The Second Model 25mm differed in that it used a long, thick metal locking bar with a turned-down bolt-handle, like the metal bolt on a bolt-action rifle, which locked into a recess machined into the frame. This slid through a round sleeve atop each half of the weapon to secure the two halves. When the bolt was unlatched and pulled to the rear, the back-plate was turned to the operator's right using the rear grip, allowing access to the cylinder. The operator could then pull out the spent shells and reload fresh ones.

Barrel and cylinder inserts were available to allow it to fire 12-gauge shells or clusters of .38 Special cartridges.

== 37mm Manville Gas Gun ==
In 1938, Manville introduced a twelve round gun with a 37mm (1.5-inch) bore. This version fired 37mm × 5.5 inch Long (37mm × 127mmR) flare, smoke, or tear gas shells and was designed for police and security use. It was meant to be used in an indirect fire mode and had its barrel mounted at the bottom of the cylinder rather than the top. Its greater weight prohibited its use by any but the strongest of men, since it was designed to be fired from a tripod or pintle mount.

== History ==
The Indiana National Guard used 26.5mm Manville guns to break up groups of strikers during the Terre Haute General Strike of 1935. They fired flare and tear gas shells at strikers until they dispersed.

Police and military forces found the Manville guns to be large and heavy, resulting in limited sales. The Manville company ceased production of the weapons in 1943, after which Charles Manville destroyed all machinery, dies, diagrams and notes.

== Related guns ==
=== Hawk Engineering MM-1 ===
A gun with a similar design, the Hawk MM-1, was introduced in the 1970s. It was chambered in 37mmR and 40×46mmR and had a 12-round cylinder.

=== XM-18E1R (fictional) ===
The 1980 film The Dogs of War used a Second Model 25mm Manville Machine-Projector as the weapon of choice for the lead protagonist, Shannon (Christopher Walken). In the film, the weapon is called a "XM-18E1R projectile-launcher", deemed capable of firing munitions far beyond the actual Manville gun. Dialogue and literature in the film suggests that it fires fragmentation, grenade, tactical, anti-tank, anti-personnel and "flashette" [sic] shells. Rate of fire was touted as "18 rounds in five seconds". The actual "shells" used during the film were 12-gauge blanks set in cylinder adapters.

=== RGA-86 ===
The RGA-86 (pol. Ręczny Granatnik Automatyczny wz 86, Handheld Automatic Grenade Launcher pattern 86) is a Polish 26 mm revolver grenade launcher, developed between 1983 and 1986 at the Wojskowa Akademia Techniczna state research institute by a team consisting of: S. Ciepielski, M. Czeladzki, S. Derecki, H. Głowicki, W. Koperski, J. Pawłowski and R. Wójcik.

== Notes ==
- Machine Projector by C. J. Manville
