= Babies of Biafra =

The Babies of Biafra was a Biafran aviation unit. Foreign mercenaries and Igbo served in the squadron.

At the origins of the squadron was the Swedish ace pilot Carl Gustav von Rosen. His first team included four Swedes and three Igbo. At the suggestion of von Rosen, the Biafrians decided to purchase several Swedish light single-engine training aircraft, Malmö MFI-9 Junior. In the period from 22 to 30 May 1969, the squadron flew several sorties.

The Swedish government demanded that the compatriots return home. A month later von Rosen returned to Biafra. Until the end of the war, he was engaged in training pilots. Portuguese mercenaries became the backbone of the squadron. Since the beginning of autumn, pilots flew T-6G Harvards.

== See also ==
- 4th Commando Brigade (Biafra)
- Aviation in the Nigerian Civil War

== Literature ==
- Кондратьев, П.С. (2016). Европейцы на фронтах Биафры (1967–1970 гг.). Вестник ЯрГУ. 2 (36).
- Коновалов, И.П. (2015). Солдаты удачи и воины корпораций : История современного наёмничества. Пушкино: Центр стратегической конъюнктуры. ISBN 978-5-9906069-7-5.
