= RGA-86 =

- Type: Grenade Launcher
- Place of origin: Polish People's Republic

Production history
- Designed: 1983–1986

Specifications
- Mass: 6.2 kg (13.67 lb)
- Length: 700 mm (27.6 in) stock extended / 580 mm (22.8 in) stock folded
- Barrel length: 225 mm (8.9 in)
- Cartridge: 26 mm special (flare/smoke rounds)
- Caliber: 26.7 mm
- Action: Double-action revolver
- Rate of fire: 30 rounds/min
- Muzzle velocity: 140 m/s (459 ft/s)
- Maximum firing range: 100 m
- Feed system: Breech-loaded, 15-round revolving magazine
- Sights: Front post and rear flip-up sight

The RGA-86 (pol. Ręczny Granatnik Automatyczny wz 86, Handheld Automatic Grenade Launcher pattern 86) is a Polish 26 mm revolver grenade launcher, developed between 1983 and 1986 at the Wojskowa Akademia Techniczna state research institute by a team consisting of: S. Ciepielski, M. Czeladzki, S. Derecki, H. Głowicki, W. Koperski, J. Pawłowski and R. Wójcik.

== See also ==
- List of shotguns
- Granatnik RGP-40
- Hawk MM-1
- Manville gun
- RG-6 grenade launcher
