= 4th Commando Brigade (Biafra) =

Insignia of the 4th Commando Brigade

The 4th Commando Brigade was a unit of the Biafran Armed Forces. The brigade was created by order of Colonel C. Odumegwu Ojukwu in April 1968.

The unit consisted of five battalions, one being Marines. The brigade was led by Rolf Steiner. His deputies were George Norbiato, Arman Ianarelli (Ahoada strike group), John Erasmus (Abaliki strike group) and Taffy Williams (Nsukka strike group). In addition to those listed, Alexandra Gay and Lewis Mulroney served in the brigade.

The personnel wore the colors of the French Foreign Legion — green and red, with green berets. The motto was the phrase "Honor and loyalty". The main symbol of the brigade was the death's head.

The unit performed well in mobile sabotage and reconnaissance operations, but usually failed in large-scale clashes.

After the failure of Operation Hiroshima, the command of the brigade passed to the Biafrians.

== See also ==
- Babies of Biafra

== Literature ==
- Кондратьев, П.С. (2016). "Европейцы на фронтах Биафры (1967–1970 гг.)". Вестник ЯрГУ (in Russian). 2 (36). ЯрГУ: 45–48.
- Коновалов, И.П. (2015). Солдаты удачи и воины корпораций. История современного наёмничества (in Russian). Пушкино: Центр стратегической конъюнктуры. p. 215. ISBN 978-5-9906069-7-5.
