= Emilio Tafeng =

General Emilio Tafeng (1910–19??), also Emedio Tafeng, Emedio Tafeng Odongi, was the Commander In Chief of the Anyanya movement and a military commander in the First Sudanese Civil War, fighting on the side of Southern Sudan. In 1963 he established camps across the southern borders of Sudan, in Zaire (now Democratic Republic of the Congo) and Uganda, and waged an intermittent war of sabotage and ambush against government forces. In August 1971, Joseph Lagu captured the leadership from Tafeng and became military and political head of the new South Sudan Liberation Movement.
