= Taffy Williams =

South African mercenary (1933–1996)

- Born: David Hugh Williams; 28 September 1933; Bridgend, Glamorgan, Wales
- Died: 7 May 1996 (aged 62); Lambeth, London, England
- Military career
- Allegiance: State of Katanga; Republic of Biafra
- Service years: –1970
- Conflict(s): Congo Crisis; Nigerian Civil War

David Hugh "Taffy" Williams (28 September 1933 – 7 May 1996) was a Welsh-born South African mercenary who fought for the State of Katanga during the Congo Crisis (1960–1963) and the Republic of Biafra during the Nigerian Civil War (1967–1970).

== Biafran War ==
Noted for his bravery under fire he served two tours of duty with the Biafran Army, rising to the rank of major, and was the last white mercenary to leave the country as secession ended.

Williams found his Biafran troops to be completely different from those whom he commanded in Katanga. "I've seen a lot of Africans at war," he was quoted as saying. "But there's nobody to touch these people. Give me 10,000 Biafrans for six months, and we'll build an army that would be invincible on this continent. I've seen men die in this war who would have won the Victoria Cross in another context". An irascible man, he was known for constantly screaming at his men and threatening to kill them if they did not obey his orders with a Time correspondent in 1968 observed him to shout at his troops: "You rotten bastards! You bloody, treacherous morons!". Williams was known in Biafra as being "bullet proof" due to his ability to survive multiple wounds and was five times reported to be killed in action between December 1967-October 1968, only for him to turn up alive.

Williams was assigned one hundred Biafran fighters in early 1968, and managed to keep two battalions of Chadian mercenaries serving with the Nigerian Federal Army at bay for twelve weeks with only antiquated weapons. After Williams redeployed his forces in early April, the Chadians forded the Cross River at two locations, and captured Afikpo, a main town on the western side.

Completing his first contract and following a brief stay in the UK, Williams returned to Biafra on 7 July 1968. He was assigned to the 4th Commando Brigade led by Lt. Col Rolf Steiner. Steiner had command of 3000 men, and was assigned to the area around the Enugu - Onitsha road. Williams, who liked to joke that he was "half-mad", would personally lead his troops into battle, sometimes standing in a hail of Federal gunfire, just to prove to his troops that he was indeed "bullet-proof". His resolve under fire would often unnerve the more superstitious of Nigerian soldiers and serve to rally his own.

On 24 August 1968 Williams was drawn into a critical battle of the conflict. At this point, he had 1000 soldiers under his command which carried out counteroffensives against two battalion-sized enemy units attempting to cross the Imo River Bridge with Soviet military advisers. When Williams returned to Aba for additional ammunition to continue the fight, he was told that there was simply none to be had. The Nigerian Air Force had become quite successful in blocking supplies into the beleaguered state. Some of Williams' men had only two rounds left for their rifles and many were forced to withdraw.

Following the arrest and expulsion of Steiner and four others, Major Williams was allegedly the only European still left serving with the Biafran army. He left the state shortly before its collapse. It is thought that Williams, who encountered author Frederick Forsyth there as a war correspondent, served as the inspiration for the character of Carlo Shannon in Forsyth's The Dogs of War.

== Afterward ==
He died in 1996.

== Sources ==
- Steiner, Rolf. The Last Adventurer (Boston: Little, Brown & Co., 1978), 275 pages.
- Mok, Michael. Biafra Journal (Time-Life Books, 1969), 95 pages.
- Forsyth, Frederick. The Biafra Story (Pen & Sword Books, 2009) 291 pages.
