= The Dogs of War (novel) =

1974 novel by Frederick Forsyth

- First edition (UK)
- Author: Frederick Forsyth
- Cover artist: Ian West / Michael Brett
- Language: English
- Genre: War novel
- Publisher: Hutchinson (UK); Viking Press (US)
- Publication date: 1974
- Publication place: United Kingdom
- Media type: Print (hardback and paperback)

The Dogs of War is a 1974 war novel by British writer Frederick Forsyth, featuring a small group of European mercenary soldiers hired by a British industrialist to depose the government of the fictional African country of Zangaro. The story details a geologist's mineral discovery, and the preparations for the attack: soldier recruitment, training, reconnaissance, and the logistics of the coup d'état (buying weapons, transport, payment). The source of the title, The Dogs of War, is Act III, scene 1, line 270 of Julius Caesar (1599), by William Shakespeare: Cry, 'Havoc!', and let slip the dogs of war.

The mercenary protagonists are ruthless, violent anti-heroes. Initially introduced as simple killers-for-hire, they are gradually shown to adhere to a relatively moral mercenary code as the novel progresses, but as the protagonist explains to another character, it is difficult for civilians to understand. Forsyth draws upon his journalistic experiences in reporting the 1970 Biafran War between Biafra and Nigeria; though fictional, the African 'Republic of Zangaro' is based upon Equatorial Guinea, a former Spanish colony. The novel's dedication to five men named Giorgio, Christian, Schlee, Big Marc and Black Johnny and "the others in the unmarked graves" concludes: "at least we tried"—and alludes to Forsyth's time in Biafra; the dark tone and cynical plot of the story stem from the same source.

A film version was released in 1980, based upon the novel and directed by John Irvin. The movie was filmed in Belize.

== Plot summary ==
=== Prologue ===
In 1970, Anglo-Irish mercenary Carlo Alfred Thomas "Cat" Shannon and his four fellow mercenaries – German ex-smuggler Kurt Semmler, South African mortar expert Janni Dupree, Belgian bazooka specialist Marc Vlaminck, and Corsican knife-fighter Jean-Baptiste Langarotti – leave a West African war they have lost, saying their goodbyes to the general who had employed them for the past six months. While the general and his people leave for exile in one plane, Shannon, his men and a group of nuns with their orphan charges fly out for Libreville in another, piloted by a South African mercenary. After a six-week house arrest in a hotel, the mercenaries are flown to Paris, where they part company.

=== Part 1: The Crystal Mountain ===
A few weeks later a prospector employed by British-based company ManCon (Manson Consolidated) sends mineral samples, acquired from the "Crystal Mountain" in the remote hinterland of the African republic of Zangaro, to headquarters. When they are analysed, ruthless British mining tycoon Sir James Manson realises that there is a huge platinum deposit in Zangaro. The president of Zangaro, Jean Kimba, is Marxist, homicidal, insane, and under Soviet influence, so any public announcement of the findings would benefit only the Russians. Confiding solely in his top assistants, security chief Simon Endean and financial expert Martin Thorpe, Manson plans to depose Kimba and install a puppet leader who, for a pittance, will sign over Zangaro's mining rights to a shell company secretly owned by Sir James. When ManCon eventually acquires the shell company for a fair market price, Sir James and his aides will pocket £60 million.

Endean visits a freelance writer to discuss his recommendations and eventually hires Shannon to reconnoitre Zangaro and investigate how Kimba might be deposed. Masquerading as a tourist under the name "Keith Brown", Shannon visits the country and upon his return to London submits a report stating that the army has little fighting value and that Kimba has concentrated the national armoury, treasury, and radio station within the presidential palace in Clarence, the Zangaran capital city and principal port. Should the palace be stormed and Kimba killed, there will be no opposition whatsoever to any new regime. Because Zangaro itself lacks an organised dissident faction, the attacking force must be assembled outside the country and land near Clarence to capture the palace. Shannon budgets the mission at £100,000, with £10,000 for himself. While Endean has been using a fake name "Walter Harris", Shannon has him tailed by a private detective and discovers his true identity and his involvement with Sir James Manson.

Although Manson has taken steps to silence the few people aware of the Crystal Mountain platinum deposit, the chemist who analysed the samples has inadvertently revealed his findings to a former acquaintance, who (unknown to the chemist) has political connections to the Soviet government. The acquaintance reports the findings to the Soviets, who in turn assign a KGB bodyguard to Kimba while they prepare to send in their own geological survey team. In a conversation with a Foreign Office bureaucrat, Sir James learns that the Soviets have got wind of the deposit. Sir James commissions Shannon to organise and mount the coup, to take place on the eve of Zangaro's independence day, one hundred days hence, but does not tell Shannon of the Soviet involvement.

=== Part 2: The Hundred Days ===
Shannon reassembles his old team to execute the attack on Kimba's palace, and the team trawls Europe to procure a nondescript tramp cargo vessel (later finding the MV Toscana), inflatable motorboats, uniforms, submachine guns or carbines (eventually buying "Schmeissers", MP-40 machine pistols), mortars, anti-tank weapons, and ammunition. To conceal the nature and purpose of these purchases, Shannon spreads them over several countries, buys from both legitimate and black market suppliers, and establishes a holding company to thwart attempts to unmask the buyers' true identities. He also finds time for a brief sexual liaison with Julie Manson, Sir James' daughter; when she accidentally reveals to him that she saw a mining report of Zangaro and its mineral wealth he learns the object of Sir James' true plan.

Simultaneously, Charles Roux, one of Shannon's arch-enemies, incensed that he did not receive Endean's project despite the freelance writer recommending him, puts a contract out on Shannon. Hearing of this, Langarotti tips Shannon off and they lure the assassin, Raymond Thomard, into a trap. They then send Thomard's severed head to Roux, permanently intimidating him into silence.

Martin Thorpe has meanwhile secretly purchased the controlling interest in a shell company (Bormac Trading) from the ailing widow of its founder. Endean has obtained the agreement of Colonel Antoine Bobi, a former commander of the Zangaran Army who fell out with Kimba and is now in exile, to participate in Sir James's scheme. Once installed as president, the venal and illiterate Bobi will sign over the mineral rights to the Crystal Mountain to Bormac for a nominal price but a large bribe for himself.

Having loaded the arms and other equipment aboard the Toscana, the mercenaries sail to Freetown in Sierra Leone to pick up six African mercenaries, disguised as casual stevedores, who will also participate in the attack, and Dr. Okoye, an African academic.

=== Part 3: The Killing Spree ===
The mercenaries attack President Kimba's palace at the break of dawn. While Dupree and two of the African mercenaries lay down a mortar bombardment and Vlamick destroys the palace gates, Semmler, Shannon, Langarotti, and the other four African mercenaries storm the palace; Semmler shoots Kimba as he tries to escape through his bedroom window. Kimba's KGB bodyguard escapes the firefight and fatally shoots Vlaminck in the chest, but Vlaminck is able to retaliate and blow him up with his last rocket. Following the bombardment, Dupree and his two African mercenaries attack the nearby army camp. A Zangaran soldier throws a grenade at them as he flees (without pulling the pin beforehand) and one of the African mercenaries throws it back (after pulling the pin), but it falls short and Dupree, briefly deafened by the shelling and gunfire, fails to hear the warnings and is accidentally killed in the blast.

Around midday Endean arrives in Clarence to install Colonel Bobi as the new Zangaran president. He has his own bodyguard, a former East End gang enforcer. When Endean and Bobi arrive at the palace, Shannon lures Bobi into the presidential office. A shot is heard and Endean realizes that Shannon has killed Bobi. Shannon shoots Endean's bodyguard to protect himself as the enforcer tries to draw his gun, and then permanently refuses to allow the Soviet geological survey team permission to land in Zangaro. He introduces Dr. Okoye as the new head of the Zangaran government.

=== The aftermath ===
As Shannon drives Endean to the border he explains that Endean's otherwise comprehensive research had recognised, but failed to account for, the 20,000 immigrant workers who did most of the work in Zangaro, but had been politically disenfranchised by both the colonial government and Kimba regime; fifty of them, in new uniforms and armed with Schmeissers, have already been recruited as the nucleus of the new Zangaran Army. Shannon reveals to Endean that the general Shannon had served under at the beginning of the novel is the acknowledged leader of these people, that he will come to Zangaro to officially take over, and that if Manson wants the platinum he will have to pay the proper market price. Endean threatens reprisals if Shannon ever returns to London, but Shannon remains unfazed.

In the novel's epilogue, it is revealed that Dupree and Vlaminck were buried in simple unmarked graves near the shore. Semmler later sold the Toscana to its captain, and would be killed while on another mercenary operation in Africa. Langarotti took his pay and was last seen heading off to train a new group of Hutu partisans in Burundi against Michel Micombero, telling Shannon "It's not really the money. It was never for the money."

In Zangaro, a "Council of Reconciliation", consisting of members from the Vindu, Caja and immigrant worker communities under the leadership of the General, assumes control and governs with moderation. With no other choice, Sir James Manson and Endean keep silent about their part in the coup.

The final pages reveal that before embarking on the Zangaro operation, Shannon had been diagnosed with terminal lung cancer (skin cancer in some American editions) with only six months to a year to live. Three months after the coup, he posts the remainder of his earnings to the surviving family members of his fallen comrades, and also sends a manuscript (presumably describing the events) to a journalist in London (presumably the freelance writer who recommended him). Finally, as his cancer worsens, Shannon walks into the African bush, whistling a favourite tune ("Spanish Harlem"), to end his life on his own terms with "a gun in his hand, blood in his mouth, and a bullet in his chest".

== Characters ==
- Carlo Alfred Thomas "Cat" Shannon: an Anglo-Irish former Royal Marine turned mercenary
- "Tiny" Marc Vlaminck: Huge Belgian mercenary and bazooka expert, bartender
- Kurt Semmler: German ex–Hitler Youth turned mercenary, smuggler
- Janni Dupree: Afrikaner mercenary and mortar expert
- Jean-Baptiste Langarotti: Corsican-born former French paratrooper turned mercenary, expert knife-fighter and member of the Unione Corse
- Sir James Manson: Owner and Chairman of Manson Consolidated
- Simon Endean: Manson's chief of security and the man who hires Shannon; poses as "Walter Harris"
- Martin Thorpe: Manson's financial expert
- Jean Kimba: Zangaro's president turned dictator
- Antoine Bobi: Exiled Zangaran army colonel, recruited by Manson and Endean to be a puppet leader
- Charles Roux: French ex-Legionnaire, failed mercenary and now small-time crime boss in Paris; self-proclaimed leader of all French mercenaries, passionately hates Shannon
- Raymond Thomard: Former mercenary hired by Roux to kill Shannon
- Henri Alain: One of Roux's contacts
- Dr Okoye: African academic and representative of "The General"
- Julie Manson: Daughter of Sir James Manson, fashion model and Shannon's lover
- "The General": Unnamed popular leader of a breakaway African republic that was conquered by the Central Federal Government, lives in exile (based on president of Biafra Chukwuemeka Odumegwu Ojukwu)
- Benny Lambert: An ex-mercenary who tries to tip Roux off about Shannon's whereabouts but having given outdated information, Roux orders Thomard to break his legs

== Research ==
While researching the story of The Dogs of War, Frederick Forsyth pretended to be preparing a coup d'état against Equatorial Guinea on behalf of the Igbo people whom he passionately supports; he was told it would cost 240,000 US dollars. Five years after the 1973 attempted coup d'état, Forsyth's research was subject of a feature story in The Times, which posited he had commissioned the operation in earnest; many people believed he was planning a real coup d'état in Equatorial Guinea. According to UK National Archives documents released in 2005, in early 1973, several people in Gibraltar were planning a coup d'état against Equatorial Guinea, in the manner described in The Dogs of War. Spain arrested several mercenaries in the Canary Islands on 23 January 1973, foiling the plot.

Ironically, there was an actual coup d'état in Equatorial Guinea in 1979, when Francisco Macías Nguema, the left-wing dictator, was overthrown and killed by his nephew, Teodoro Obiang Nguema Mbasogo, the right-wing president/dictator. In 2004, in a copycat plan based on Forsyth's book, a coup d'état intended to secure lucrative mining rights granted by a client puppet government was attempted. The plan involved Mark Thatcher, who was intending to trade on his mother's (former British prime minister Margaret Thatcher) connections and reputation to call favours, and the mercenary Simon Mann, who subsequently stood trial and was convicted. Thatcher received a suspended 4-year sentence; Mann was sentenced to 34 years in 2008 but was pardoned in 2009.

In Ken Connor's book How to Stage a Military Coup, the author praises The Dogs of War as a textbook for mercenaries.

== Film adaptation ==
- United Artists released a 1980 film adaptation directed by John Irvin and starring Christopher Walken and Tom Berenger. The plot was greatly simplified from the book.

== References to other Forsyth books ==
- The prelude to this novel explains Shannon's mercenary squad members. The German, Kurt Semmler, loses his respect for Colonel Marc Rodin when the OAS finally fell apart. In The Day of the Jackal, Rodin hires an unidentified British killer in an attempt to assassinate Charles de Gaulle after he realises that all the previous OAS plots to kill the President of France have been dismantled because the suspect involved was known to the French government. The killer was hired because his identity is totally unknown to any authorities in France. At the end of the aforementioned book, the British assassin is killed, which presumably leads to the dissolution of the OAS. The killer's method of obtaining a legitimate passport through trickery is also mentioned as a tactic used by Shannon.
