= Hawk MM-1 =

- Type: Grenade launcher
- Place of origin: United States

Specifications
- Mass: 5.7 kg (13 lb) unloaded
- Length: 635 mm (25.0 in)
- Caliber: 40x46mm
- Rate of fire: semi-automatic
- Effective firing range: 150 m (490 ft) point targets, 350 m (1,150 ft) area targets
- Feed system: 12 round rotating-drum

The MM-1 is a 40x46mm semi-automatic grenade launcher manufactured during the 1980s in the United States by the Hawk Engineering Company from Lake Bluff, Illinois.

== Development ==
The Hawk MM-1 was adapted from the Manville machine projector, a revolver-type 18-shot tear gas gun, developed in USA for police use before the Second World War.

Michael Rogak upsized the Manville design to 40mm and made certain design changes. One innovation was Rogak's development of a button rifling procedure for the aluminum barrel. This increased the speed of production while reducing costs. Subsequently, Rogak and a few others formed Hawk Engineering and began production of the MM-1.

== Operation ==
The MM-1 is a revolver-type weapon, with the heavy cylinder being rotated for each shot by the clockwork-type spring. The cylinder could hold up to 12 rounds. The spring is wound manually during the reloading. It can accept any 40 mm grenade of up to 101 mm length. To reload the cylinder, the rear part of the gun is released and rotated sideways to expose the rear of the cylinder, which is connected to the front part of the frame and barrel. The rate of fire can be up to 30 rounds per minute.

== Operators ==
- Revolutionary Armed Forces of Colombia

Jane's Infantry Weapons claims the MM-1 was used with special warfare units by the US and some South American and African countries, but American Rifleman says "if this is so, it is on a very limited basis."

== In popular culture ==
The MM-1 has appeared in several films and TV shows, most notably being wielded by Arnold Schwarzenegger as The Terminator in Terminator 2: Judgment Day (1991).

The MM-1 Grenade Launcher appears in the 2012 video game Call of Duty: Black Ops 2, where it can be used in the campaign gamemode, as in the 1999 video game Parasite Eve II.

== See also ==
- RGA-86 – (Poland)
- Manville machine projector – (United States)
